= Timeline of events related to the Southern Thailand insurgency =

This article lists a chronology of events in the Southern Thailand insurgency from the 1960s. Most take place in the Muslim–majority, contested provinces of Narathiwat, Pattani, and Yala in the far south of Thailand bordering Muslim Malaysia.

For earlier events see History of Thailand.

== Timeline ==
=== 1960–1998 ===
Although the conflict was carried out with low intensity, armed resistance in the 1960s and 1970s involved up to 1,500 insurgents.

1960– The Barisan Revolusi Nasional (BRN) was founded by Haji Abdul Karim in response to the introduction of a secular curriculum in Pattani's religious boarding schools.

1968– Patani United Liberation Organisation (PULO) was founded by Tengku Bira Kotanila (alias Kabir Abdul Rahman). PULO became the most powerful insurgent group during the 1960 – 2000 period of the war.

29 November 1975– Thai marines allegedly murdered five Muslim youths in the Bacho District of Narathiwat Province. The government allegedly failed to conduct a proper investigation into the matter.

11 December 1975– PULO organised mass protests in response to the event, which were joined by 70,000 Malay Muslims. A bomb was thrown into the crowd killing 12 and injuring at least 30 protesters. The attack was blamed on Buddhist extremists.

The government charged and imprisoned the perpetrators and launched an official inquiry and compensated the families of the victims. Despite the fact that the majority of the protesters demands were granted, the event led to an escalation of the insurgency.

June 1977– Sabilillah (Path of God) bombed Don Mueang International Airport in Bangkok. In the aftermath of the bombing Sabilillah vanished into obscurity.

September 1977– Black December 1902 members threw a bomb into a Thai royal ceremony. Five persons were killed and 47 wounded. The royal family managed to escape unharmed.

1977– Security forces killed BNPP leader Tunku Yala Nasae.

- Renewed agitation began in the 1990s, led by Malay intellectuals influenced by revolutionary and Islamist ideas from the Middle East. The BRN split into three rival factions, of which the most militant were the BRN Coordinate and the BRN Congress. The BRN Congress is regarded as the most active group, but there are several others, and competition between these militant groups has helped fuel the insurgency. It is believed that there is now a co–ordinating body called the Patani United Liberation Organisation (Dewan Pembebasan Pattani or PULO), although little is known about the composition or leadership of the various groups.

1993– The New PULO, a dissident faction of the original PULO, was established by Arrong Moo–reng and Hayi Abdul Rohman Bazo.

1995– Nasoree Saesang founded the GMIP.

August 1996– Thirty–six schools were torched in Yala, Pattani, and Narathiwat allegedly by members of the New PULO faction, reportedly a dissident faction of the original PULO established by Arrong Moo–reng and Hayi Abdul Rohman Bazo. The Thai Interior Ministry and Thai Military Intelligence reported that New PULO used unemployed youth and young drug addicts to carry out its missions.

1997– Members of the Barisan Revolusi Nasional Melayu Patani (BRN), PULO and the New PULO established Bersatu, also known as the Patani Malays People's Consultative Council, to improve co–ordination between rebel factions.

August 1997– Bersatu launched an operation code named "Falling Leaves". Between August 1997 and January 1998, 33 separate attacks took place resulting in nine deaths.

January 1998– Malaysia and Thailand launched a joint operation code named "Pitak Tai" to crack down on insurgent outfits. Malaysian authorities arrested New PULO's leader, Abdul Rohman Bazo, its military chief, Haji Daoh Thanam, and Bazo's senior assistant, Haji Mae Yala in Kedah, as well as PULO's military commander, Haji Sama–ae Thanam, in Kuala Lumpur, later handing them to Thai authorities. The Thai government also encouraged local people to monitor the movements of drug traffickers and, as a result, the tough policy on drugs deprived PULO of recruits.

=== 1999–2002 ===
- Following the 11 September 2001 attacks in the United States, leaflets calling for Holy War and support for Osama bin Laden were distributed in Yala by militants.

24 December 2001– Insurgents launched a number of attacks on police posts in the three provinces. Five police and one defence volunteer were killed.

- The Thai National Intelligence Agency estimated that fewer than 1,000 armed militants were taking part in the conflict as of 2001. In that year, the Thai Ministry of Interior estimated that 50 insurgency–related incidents had occurred. By 2002, 75 insurgency–linked attacks had killed 50 police and army personnel.

=== 2003 ===
- In 2003, officials counted 149 incidents. The mounting scale and sophistication of the insurgency eventually prompted the government into a recognition that there was a serious issue in the southern provinces.

=== 2004 ===
4 January– An escalation of the violence in the southern border provinces of Yala, Pattani, and Narathiwat is reckoned to have begun on 4 January 2004 with the raiding of a Thai Army depot. Unidentified gunmen raided an army ammunition depot in Narathiwat Province in the early morning, and made off with over 400 rifles and ammunition.

5 January– Two policemen were killed while attempting to defuse a bomb outside a shopping mall in Pattani. A third policeman was injured in bomb blast that occurred in a nearby park. Two more bombs were successfully defused in nearby areas. Prime minister Thaksin Shinawatra declared martial law in the provinces of Narathiwat, Pattani, and Yala.

22 January– Rebels killed a Buddhist monk.

12 March– Somchai Neelapaijit, a Thai–Muslim lawyer and human rights activist, was abducted in Ramkhamhaeng, Bangkok. He represented Muslim defendants, who said they had been tortured, in terrorism cases. He was never seen again.

28 March– A bomb planted by insurgents injured 29 people, including 10 Malaysian tourists.

30 March– Masked men raided a quarry in the Yala District, stealing a total of 1.6 tonnes of ammonium nitrate, 56 sticks of dynamite, and 176 detonators.

23 April– Militants killed an army officer and set fire to 50 public buildings in all 13 districts of Narathiwat Province.

28 April– Militants launched a string of attacks on armouries and army positions in Pattani, Yala, and Songkhla. One–hundred eight rebels were killed in the aftermath of the attacks.

10 June– Militants killed a security guard outside a government school and seized weapons from other security personnel who were inside.

25 October– Seventy–eight persons were killed by Thai police in the aftermath of a riot over the detentions of Muslims suspected of giving weapons to Islamic separatists. Over 1,300 people were detained in the incident.

28 October– An IED detonated outside a bar, killing two persons and injuring 21.

2 November– A Buddhist official was beheaded by suspected Muslim insurgents.

4 November– Nine persons were killed including two police.

7 November– The Defence Minister of Thailand said that there had been more than 700 casualties in south Thailand since the unrest began in January. Many murders involved shooting and decapitation. During 2004, insurgents began to sow fear in attacks by beheading Buddhists.

13 November– One man was killed and at least 13 people injured when five bomb blasts occurred in various parts of the region.

5 December– Thailand airdropped nearly 100 million origami cranes over the southern regions of the country in an effort to bring peace. Militants respond with series of bombings the following day.

- A total of 400 people were killed in over 1,000 incidents during 2004.

=== 2005 ===
17 February– A bomb exploded near a tourist hotel in the town of Sungai Kolok, killing five persons and wounding over 40. Four persons were killed in other incidents.

3 April– A series of bomb attacks in Songkhla killed two people and leaving 66 injured. The bombings marked the beginning of attacks against ethnic Thai–Chinese–owned businesses who were considered Thaksin supporters and against southern Thailand independence as a Muslim state.

14 July– A major attack was launched on the provincial capital of Yala city. Sixty militants targeted an area near a hotel, the railway station, two convenience stores and a restaurant roaming the streets using guns, fire–bombs, and explosives.

18 July– Two militants entered a teashop, shot Lek Pongpla, a Buddhist cloth vendor, beheaded him and left the head outside of the shop.

19 July– The Thai Prime Minister enacted the "emergency powers law" to manage the three troubled states giving himself sweeping powers to direct military operations, suspend civil liberties, and censor the press. Several human rights organisations and local press expressed their concerns that these new powers might be used to violate civil liberty rights. However, the emergency decree was highly popular, with 72 percent of Bangkok residents and 86 percent of people in the three southern provinces supporting it. Nevertheless, the insurgency escalated further.

31 August– Three bombs exploded almost simultaneously. Subsequently, 131 civilians from the south fled to neighbouring Malaysia seeking refuge from the Thai authorities. Thailand immediately accused the refugees of being insurgents and demanded that they be returned, sparking a diplomatic spat. Currently, the people are still in Malaysia. Thailand, suspecting that insurgents may also have fled with the refugees, has asked Malaysia to return these Thai citizens but Malaysia has refused on humanitarian grounds.

16 October– A group of 20 separatists attacked a Buddhist monastery, killing three. An extended state of emergency was announced in the three southern provinces plagued by the insurgency. The announcement sparked a large scale guerrilla raid on 60 targets, in which at least seven persons were killed and 90 weapons were stolen.

16 November– Separatists killed nine civilians and injured nine others.

- A total of 500 people were killed during 2005.

=== 2006 ===
- A brief lull in the insurgency followed the 19 September 2006 coup that overthrew the government of Premier Thaksin Shinawatra. As the Muslim Army Commander Sonthi Boonyaratkalin settled into his role as head of the junta, violence resumed. As of September 2006, more than 1,400 people had died in less than three years of southern violence. Most were innocent bystanders, both Buddhists and Muslims.

7 January– Four suspected militants fatally shot two border–police at a weekend market in Yala Province. Three others were killed in separate attacks on the same day.

10 May– A bomb exploded at a tea shop killing at least three persons and injuring more than a dozen.

19 May– Zhu–ling Ponganmoon and Sirinart Thawonsuk, teachers from Ban Kujingluepa School, Ra–ngae, Narathiwat, were kidnapped and attacked by villagers who demanded the release of Abdul Karim Matae and Muhammad Sapaeng, the leader of the RKK bandit group who was arrested by police officers under an arrest warrant for the case of using weapons of war to shoot down security guards. Manager Online, 2007

15 June– During the 60th anniversary of the accession of Bhumibol Adulyadej to the Thai throne, well–coordinated bomb–attacks against at least 40 government and official buildings occurred. Two police officials died and 11 others were injured. Experts say that the bomb attacks were a message to the Thai authorities, rather than an attempt to do real damage, as the bombs were loaded with small amounts of explosives. Had the devices been larger, the casualties and injuries would have been notably greater. The Thai media was late in reporting the incident, only doing so after the BBC and other international news services had announced it.

18 June– Mass graves of about 300 migrant workers were found in southern Thailand.

27 June– Seven persons including five security personnel were killed in separatist attacks.

31 August– Twenty–two commercial banks were simultaneously bombed in Yala Province, killing a retired military officer and wounding 24 people. Afterwards, Army chief Sonthi Boonyaratglin announced that he would break with government policy and negotiate with the leaders of the insurgency. However, he noted that "We still don't know who is the real head of the militants we are fighting with." In a press conference the next day, he slammed the government for political interference, and asked that the government "Free the military and let it do the job." By 16 September, the army admitted that it still wasn't sure whom to negotiate with.

September– Army Commander Sonthi Boonyaratkalin was granted an extraordinary increase in executive powers to combat the unrest.

16 September– Six remotely detonated motorcycle bombs simultaneously exploded in the 2006 Hat Yai bombings, killing four people and wounding more than sixty. A Canadian and a Malaysian were among the dead.

21 September– Two villagers were shot in Yala, killing one and wounding another.

23 September– Four police were injured in a bus stop explosion in Pattani. The bus stop was on a road that would be passed by the motorcade of Crown Prince Maha Vajiralongkorn later that afternoon.

25 September– Two police stations and a military outpost were attacked by 30 gunmen in a coordinated series of attacks in Yala, leaving two dead and one injured.

27 September– Gunmen killed a grocer and two of his customers in Mueang Yala District of Yala Province and a traveller on the bus from Panare District to Mayo District of Pattani.

28 September– A teacher protection unit in Su–ngai Padi District of Narathiwat Province was ambushed by a bomb attack, seriously injuring four soldiers and killing one.

18 October– Suspected Muslim guerrillas raided an army base, killing one soldier and wounding four others.

4 November– Three schools burned to the ground and a person received a gunshot wound.

5 November– A bomb blast killed two soldiers and injured three others. Four persons were killed and six wounded in a series of shootings and bomb blasts.

9 November– Eight car and motorcycle showrooms were simultaneously bombed in Yala, injuring 13. Almost all gold shops in Mueang District closed down for fear of their safety. Commercial banks remained open, but with tightened security.

- From January 2004 to October 2006, 1,815 people were killed and 2,729 were wounded in the insurgency. Despite the renewed violence, a post–coup opinion poll found that southerners had become the happiest people of Thailand.

15 November– Militants shot dead three persons in separate drive–by shootings. One soldier was also wounded in a bomb blast.

17 November– Three bomb explosions killed one person and wounded at least 30 others.

22 November– Wan Kadir Che Wan, leader of Bersatu, one of the southern insurgent groups, told Al Jazeera television that the Al–Qaeda–linked Jemaah Islamiyah (JI) network was helping local insurgents stage attacks in Thailand.

27 November– After all schools in Pattani announced indefinite shutdown, teachers in Yala and Narathiwat followed suit and closed down schools in the two provinces indefinitely for safety. The decision in Pattani was made after a series of arson attacks against schools and the fatal shooting of two schoolteachers. In Yala, Pattani, and Narathiwat Provinces over 1,000 schools were shut down.

9 December– A police informant was killed in a drive–by shooting.

29 December– Two teachers were shot and burned to death.

31 December– Nine bomb blasts occurred in Bangkok on New Year's Eve, killing three persons and injuring 38. New Year's Eve celebrations were cancelled.

=== 2007 ===
Despite conciliatory gestures from the junta, the insurgency continued and intensified. The death toll, 1,400 at the time of the coup, increased to 2,579 by mid–September 2007.

From January 2004 to 21 June 2007, the south witnessed 6,850 violent incidents related to the insurgency. At least 2,303 people were killed and more than 6,000 injured in that time, according to Srisompob Jitpiromsri of Prince of Songkhla University's Pattani campus.

Junta chairman Sonthi Boonyaratglin announced that the Southern Border Provinces Administrative Centre (SBPAC) and the Civilian–Police–Military Task Force (CPM) 43 would be revived. Sonthi said the army–led multi–agency Southern Border Provinces Peace Building Command would be dissolved and its troops would come under CPM 43, which would operate in parallel with the SBPAC. The SBPAC and CPM 43 had been dissolved in mid–2001 by former Premier Thaksin Shinawatra. Before that, CPM 43 was under the directive of the SBPAC. Sonthi also made himself head of the Internal Security Operations Command (ISOC). Previously, ISOC had been headed by the prime minister.

ISOC was given 5.9 billion baht in funding for fiscal year 2007. By May 2007, General Sonthi asked the government for an additional emergency budget of two billion baht for ISOC, as the normal budget was running out. The money was under the "secret budget" category, which meant that state officials could spend it without having to account for it.

14 January– A rubber tapper named Pin Khotchathin was beheaded in Yala. His head was found at a rubber plantation in Tambon Tasae in Yala's Mueang district five metres from his body. It was the 22nd murder to feature a beheading since May 2004, although the militants were not always successful in removing their victim's head. A handwritten note was left near Pin's head warning of further bloodshed to avenge what the attackers, calling themselves Pattani Warriors, claimed was a case of authorities killing separatist members.

Facing rising violence, Prime Minister Surayud Chulanont accused Muslim junta chief Sonthi Boonyaratkalin of failing to do enough to curb the insurgency.

18 February– A series of bombings and arson attacks began in Narathiwat, Yala, and Pattani, and Songkhla Provinces. Six people were killed and over 50 were injured.

Violence escalated though in the months following the implementation of the junta's "hearts and minds" campaign. The monthly death toll increased by 30 percent in the five months after the coup compared to the five months before the coup. Insurgents targeted Princess Sirindhorn by placing a bomb near her helicopter's landing pad. A senior aide to Queen Sirikit, Thanpuying Viriya Chavakul, was injured and narrowly escaped death when gunmen attacked her vehicle convoy on 21 February 2007 in Yala. She later criticised the government for rotating troops too often, preventing them from building bonds with locals. She also made note of troops' lack of communications equipment and bulletproof vests.

After an official visit to Thailand, Malaysian Prime Minister Abdullah Ahmad Badawi volunteered to act as a mediator in arranging talks between insurgents and Thai authorities. Foreign Minister Nitya Pibulsonggram rejected the offer.

During the Chinese New Year weekend (from the evening of 18 February 2007 to the afternoon of 19 February 2007), insurgents executed 38 bombing attacks, 26 cases of arson, and seven ambushes. The bombings targeted hotels, karaoke bars, power grids and commercial sites. Two public schools were torched. Three people were arrested. Junta chief Sonthi and Interior Minister Aree Wongsearaya admitted that they knew in advance that attacks were going to take place. Aree later admitted that the government's southern strategy was flawed.

21 February– In their most significant act of economic sabotage and arson to date, insurgents burned down the Southland Rubber warehouse in Yala, destroying 5,000 tons of rubber worth approximately 400 million baht and engulfing Yala city in a dense cloud of black smoke for 12 hours. Thirty fire trucks fought to control the flames in the largest rubber warehouse in the deep south. Spikes were scattered on the road leading to the warehouse to slow emergency workers. No casualties were reported.

March– The junta's top security advisor admitted that insurgents imported their techniques from Al–Qaeda and the Taliban and were motivated by not only by nationalist reasons, like previous generations of insurgents, but religious extremism as well. However, it noted that it still did not know who was behind the insurgency.

To protect the Buddhist minority from violence, the Internal Security Operations Command produced Jatukham Rammathep amulets for public distribution. The renowned animist amulets were believed by some to have magical powers to protect their holders from violence and large sums were generally paid for them. The plan was developed by Colonel Manas Khongpan, deputy director of the ISOC in Yala Province.

In March 2007, Queen Sirikit vowed to protect people of all religions in the south, and initiated weapons training programmes for locals, particularly teachers. Sirikit's deputy aide–de–camp Napol Boonthap said that the government should review its strategy and not only use a conciliatory approach towards the insurgents. "Legal action must also be taken against the wrongdoers to show we mean business," he said.

14 March– Eight commuters from Betong to Hat Yai were executed after their van was stopped by insurgents. A roadside bomb delayed rangers stationed nearby in their efforts to reach the site. A Pattani United Liberation Organisation (PULO) executive blamed a portion of the violence directly on paramilitary rangers who instigated violence and then blamed insurgents for their deeds.

Crown Prince Vajiralongkorn's motorcade was again targeted by a bombing in March 2007. A local police team found the bomb before it could explode.

April– Junta chief Sonthi rejected a US offer to help train Thai forces to quell the insurgency. Sonthi continued to deny that international terrorists operate in the south.

9 April– A pick–up truck carrying students and other passengers returning from a funeral was shot upon, killing two 12–year–old boys and two other 25–year–old university students. The funeral was for the Khuen Bang Lang tambon administration organisation chief, who was shot dead hours earlier the same day. The military initially claimed that insurgents were behind the shooting. It later admitted that village defence volunteers attacked, after allegedly being "provoked" by insurgent sympathisers on the truck. Several hundred angry villagers staged protests against the shooting, demanding the government take action against those responsible.

13 April– Protests after a mistaken shooting by security forces. Thai soldiers in Pattani shot and killed three Muslim teenagers. The soldiers, who were dispatched to investigate the torching of four mobile–phone relay outlets, opened fire on a group of teenagers when the soldiers thought the teenagers were charging at them. Locals reported that the teenagers were playing tag on the road near a weekly open market near where the soldiers were investigating. Three teenagers, aged 13 to 15 years, were killed and two others were injured. Local army commander Colonel Wanchai Paungkhumsa initially said the soldiers had acted in self–defense, saying that gunshots were fired from where a teenager was standing. Residents ended their protest after reaching a series of agreements with Pattani Governor Panu Uthairath over the shooting. The military agreed to investigate the shootings, and if it was a negligent act, soldiers would be faced criminal charges, be transferred out of the area, and an apology would be given to locals.

May– Sonthi started withdrawing troops from the south, replacing them with territorial defence volunteers. He did not say why the regular army was to be reduced in the south.

14 May– Separatist insurgents shot dead a Thai–Buddhist couple working as fruit pickers in the majority–Muslim area of Bannang Sata, Yala Province and injured their three–year–old daughter. After gunning down Praphan Ponlarak, 36, and his wife Chaddakan, the assailants decapitated Praphan, making him the 29th victim to be beheaded in Thailand's south.

Violence continued with a noted trend towards targeting soldiers and policemen, particularly after the militants' actions were criticised by Ekmeleddin Ihsanoglu, secretary–general of the Organisation of Islamic Cooperation. On 9 May 2007, the army saw its worse casualty in a single incident in years, when seven soldiers were killed in a roadside bombing incident. Two policemen were shot dead and their bodies burnt in another attack on 11 May 2007, which the authorities suspect were conducted by the same group which killed the soldiers. Another 11 soldiers were killed on 31 May 2007 in similar style to the incident on 9 May.

Between 27 May and 29 May 2007, several concerted bombings occurred, both in Hat Yai downtown in front of markets, shops and hotels, and also in Saba Yoi, altogether killing more than four people and injuring over 20. The attacks targeted Chinese–Thai, who consider them 'Jews of the Far East' because they are barred from the Thai civil service and are mainly traders.

July– Former Fourth Army chief Harn Leelanont criticised the junta's reconciliation policy in the South, saying it left security personnel incapable of containing the violence. He claimed that it left officials and innocent people as sitting ducks to be picked off by militants.

The military junta went on a massive spending spree, buying new weaponry and a dozen fighter jets from Sweden, saying it needed the hardware to battle the insurgency.

=== 2008 ===
According to the Thai Journalists Association, during the year 2008 alone there were over 500 attacks, resulting in more than 300 deaths in the four provinces where the insurgents operate.

14 January– Insurgents killed 9 soldiers in a bomb and shooting attack.

15 January– A bombing left at least 39 people wounded in a market in Yala.

24 January– Militants fatally shot a teacher.

4 February– A bomb detonated outside an Islamic boarding school, one person was killed and 12 wounded. A second bombing wounded six persons.

15 March– A bombing occurred in the parking lot of hotel. Two persons were killed and 14 wounded in the incident.

28 May– Three soldiers and four rebels were killed in a series of incidents across the south.

5 July– Insurgents killed three cafe customers and injured four others.

3 August– Five bombs went off in the town of Songkhla injuring two persons. The same night, two bombs also exploded in Hat Yai, but caused no casualties.

17 October– One militant was killed and five others arrested.

18 October– Two persons were killed in drive–by shootings.

4 November– Two bombs exploded at a tea stall killing one person and wounded at least 71.

5 December– Four persons were killed by a bomb planted at a pharmacy.

=== 2009 ===
Unknown date– A bomb was discovered in a Christian church in Yala District.

31 January– A grenade blast killed eight persons and injured 27 others outside a Buddhist temple.

20 February– Two Thai soldiers were beheaded after a military convoy was ambushed. It was the second attack in the same month following the same pattern.

13 March– Militants killed three soldiers during an ambush in the Narathiwat Province.

19 March– A roadside bomb killed four army rangers in Pattani Province.

7 June– Insurgents killed two and injured 19 others in the Yi–ngo District of Narathiwat.

8 June– Rebel gunmen killed at least 10 and wounded 19 mosque visitors in Narathiwat Province's Hoh–I–Rong District.

13 June– Insurgents bombed a bus, killing one passenger and wounding 13 others in the center of Yala city. Additionally three people were killed and one wounded in drive–by incidents.

18 June– Security forces killed four militants during clashes in Yala Province.

19 July– Two people were killed in separate drive–by shootings in Yala and Narathiwat Provinces.

20 July– Rebels shot and killed a man in the Pattani Province.

26 August– A car bomb blast outside a restaurant wounded 26 people.

2 September– A number of drive–by shootings occurred in the provinces of Narathiwat, Pattani and Yala leaving eight dead. Security forces killed two militants in separate raids in Yala Province.

3 September– A bomb exploded in the city of Pattani killing one man and wounding 24 others.

4 September– A bomb detonated outside a restaurant, killing a policeman and wounding 12 other people.

13 September– Guerrillas killed five paramilitary troops in Yala Province.

23 October– A Muslim man was killed by gunmen while leaving a mosque after prayers in Yala Province. Also in Yala, a Muslim couple was shot in their home and the husband was killed. On the same day, the body of a Muslim man killed by insurgents was dumped on the side of the road in the Yarang District of Pattani Province.

28 October– Guerrillas killed two civilians in separate drive–by attacks.

1 November– A teenage girl was shot and killed in Yala Province. A bomb exploded at the scene after the murder, wounding three police officers. The same day the police found the body of a man who had been handcuffed and murdered at a rice farm in the area.

12 November– A Buddhist couple was shot and killed and five people were wounded in an explosion when they rushed to the scene following the murder that took place at a rice mill in Pattani Province.

8 December– A bomb exploded at a local market in the Muang District of Narathiwat Province, killing two people and wounding nine others. The blast happened about 1 km from a hotel where Thai Prime Minister Abhisit Vejjajiva and his visiting Malaysian counterpart, Najib Razak were having lunch during a trip to the region that day. Sources say the bomb was hidden in the gas tank of a motorcycle.

=== 2010 ===
2 January– Three soldiers and three civilians were injured by roadside bombs in Yala at 10–00 in Bannang Sata District, Yala Province.

13 January– Mayo District chief Wirat Prasetto was seriously injured along with ten other civilians when a bomb detonated at a pier in Pattani Province. The bombing is blamed on Muslim insurgents. One person was killed in the explosion.

Two villagers sitting at a tea shop in Narathiwat were murdered by gunmen on motorcycles.

1 April– Suspected insurgents shot dead six villagers in Narathiwat province. Ten policemen and soldiers were also wounded when a roadside bomb exploded as they were travelling to the scene of the shootings.

22 May– Two female villagers were killed in a drive–by shooting in Yala Province by suspected separatist militants.

28 May– Two were killed and 52 injured in two bomb attacks in Yala.

8 September– Police apprehended a RKK leader while he was in his house in Yala Province

=== 2011 ===
27 January– Insurgents killed a school teacher in Pattani Province.

11 February– Three people were shot and burned.

13 February– A car bomb exploded which injured 18 people, civilians and soldiers, leaving seven hospitalised. Meanwhile, an insurgent was shot dead by soldiers.

22 March– A man and two women were shot in a village of Narathiwat Province by about a dozen armed men. Police suspect the gunmen were Muslim insurgents who believed their victims were informants.

23 March– A roadside bomb went off in a village in Narathiwat when a truck carrying police arrived. None were wounded. The killings the night before may have been intended to lure security personnel to the scene to be attacked.

18 April– A car bomb exploded in the business district of Yala, killing a Thai paramilitary ranger and injuring 23 people including four other rangers.

3 May– Two grenades were fired at Pattani Task Force 21 base, but did not hurt anyone.

11 May– A bomb blast during a football match in Kapho District in Pattani Province killed four officers and wounded 13 others. Eight suspects were detained. In Yala Province, two officers and two civilians were injured after a roadside bomb detonated in Mueang Yala District.

14 May– Four insurgents came and demanded money from a gas station. The wife of the owner refused, resulting in them shooting her and her sister. After that, the owner of the gas station came and shot dead one of the insurgents, causing the other three to retreat. The dead insurgent turned out to be a minor leader operating in the area who was wanted for 2009 Narathiwat bombings.

17 May– A roadside bomb detonated in Yaha District in Yala Province, killing two monks and seriously wounding two of their security escorts. More than 100 local Muslims gathered at the local mosque and condemned the violence.

18 May–, A Thahan Phran from the 47th Regiment was shot and seriously wounded in Yala, Mueang District

20 May– A 30–man Thahan Phran unit engaged and killed four insurgents in Ban Charupae in Than To District in Yala. They seized two AK–47 assault rifles, a .38 calibre pistol and nine mobile phones. One of the dead was identified as Ma–ae Aphibalbae, a key leader operating in the area who was sought for at least 28 alleged crimes, with a bounty of 2,000,000 baht. In Narathiwat Province, two car bombs exploded, injuring a policeman and eight civilians.

22 May– In Nong Chik District, Pattani province, suspected insurgents shot a couple, Mr Pong and Mrs Somchit Khunee–art, killing both of them.

24 May– In Tak Bai, Narathiwat Province, a bomb detonated, killing a policeman and a policewoman while they were distributing food to the local community. Pol Sgt Ubonwan Chindapetch was the first policewoman to die in an explosion in the south. Meanwhile, in Sai Buri District, Pattani Province, an unknown number of gunmen came and shot Muhammat Stapo, the younger brother of Ismael Rayahlong, a major RKK leader operating in the area who was suspected of the killing of two monks on 17 May. In Krong Pinang District, Yala province, insurgents shot dead Barudin Sama, assistant village head of Ban Tohbala as he was riding to the tea shop.

25 May– Twelve soldiers from the 13th Regiment in Yala were ambushed by three insurgents, resulting the death of one soldier, private Chuchat Kaeowonghio. A few hours later, a bomb detonated under a Humvee carrying 20 soldiers, seriously wounding six of them.

27 May– Police apprehended two RKK leaders in Narathiwat Province.

30 May– A bomb went off in Mueang Yala district, Yala Province, wounding five soldiers.

31 May– Two insurgents accidentally detonated a bomb, killing themselves and injuring one other insurgent in Narathiwat Province. One of the dead was identified as Abas Abu, wanted on multiple charges of attacking state officials and multiple bombings. His brother was the insurgent shot dead in February 2011.

2 June– Eight Navy SEALS from Narathiwat Task Force 32 clashed with five RKK insurgents in the Budo Mountain Range, resulting the death of three insurgents. Two got away. They seized two M16 assault rifles, one .38 pistol, one land mine, one grenade and over 100 rounds of ammunition. Two of the dead insurgents were identified as senior recruitment members of the RKK while the third was identified as the bomb maker of the group.

4 June– Soldiers located two unexploded bombs in the middle of Tak Bai market.

25 July– Five teachers and two security volunteers were wounded in the aftermath of an IED explosion in the Muang District.

August– Fifty–three persons were killed and 75 wounded, in insurgency–related incidents.

1 August– A roadside bomb killed one and injured two soldiers in the Yarang District.

August– Fifty–three persons were killed and 75 wounded, in insurgency–related incidents.

13 September– Thai police confiscated five guns, ammunition, and currency in a house in Narathiwat. Evidence connected the house owner with insurgency organisations.

14 September– Insurgents firebombed the Palukasamoh Police Station complex, the building was almost completely destroyed.

15 September– Five paramilitary rangers were killed and one wounded in a roadside bomb blast, in the Kapho District

16 September– Three bombs exploded on the Charoen Khet Road, Sungai Kolok District. In the aftermath of the incident, four persons were killed and 110 injured, the majority of whom were Malaysian tourists. A journalist, Phamon Phonphanit, was also injured on that day (he died several days later).

23 September– A bomb blast seriously wounded a soldier, guarding a school in Rangae District.

1 October– A truck driver was shot and killed in Pattani Province. In Narathiwat Province, Chanae District, a village chief was shot dead. A motorcade of the Southern Border Provinces Administrative Centre secretary–general Panu Uthairat was ambushed by armed men in Pattani, injuring none.

3 October– Three persons were shot, two houses were burnt, and a bomb went off near a tank carrying six soldiers in Pattani Province. Police found a hole dug on the Pattani–Yala railway line and said it was in preparation for a bomb attack.

13 October– A Mayo District official, along with his driver, were killed when four insurgents attacked them with automatic weapons. One person was killed and one injured by stray bullets in the same incident. Another attack occurred in the Panareh District. Four gunmen attacked a seafood processing business, killing three persons and planting a bomb, later defused by Thai police.

20 October– A wood trader was shot dead in Narathiwat Province

23 October– A bomb exploded inside a convenience store on Phichit Bamrung Road, Muang Narathiwat municipality. A second bomb detonated inside a convenience store, located on the Chamroon Nara road, Muang Narathiwat municipality. In a third incident, 10 militants engaged in a firefight with defence volunteers, in Kasoh village, Muang Narathiwat municipality. A total of seven persons were killed and eight injured in the three incidents.

25 October– Ten bombs went off in Meung District, Yala province, killing three persons and injuring 44 others. Two of the dead were insurgents whose bombs accidentally went off when they hit a speed hump. Soldiers defused another 21 bombs. Over 60 insurgents were involved in the attack. Two soldiers were injured in separate attacks in Pattani Province.

30 October– Two men were shot and injured by suspected insurgents in Rueso District, Narathiwat Province.

31 October– Ten bombs went off in five districts across Narathiwat Province, injuring none. However, suspected insurgents shot dead two people at a petrol station and a third at a nearby grocery shop. In Yala Province, a police corporal was wounded in an explosion.

2 November– In Yala Province, a 20 kg bomb went off, injuring two police border patrol officers of the Yala 44 regiment, and seriously injuring another.

3 November– In Narathiwat Province, a 50–man police–military joint force arrested an insurgent who confessed to planting a bomb in Narathiwat on 30 October. While in the Ra–ngae District, six hunters were killed and one seriously injured when insurgents blew up their truck. Later that day, six military personnel were injured in the same region.

4 November– An unknown number of insurgents fired M–79 grenades at a military checkpoint, seriously injuring a passerby, Tiem Bangkeaw in Pattani Province. In Narathiwat Province, a joint military–defense volunteer task force apprehended two suspected insurgents carrying a shotgun and a 9 mm pistol.

14 November– A rubber tapper was killed by rebels at his workplace, in Narathiwat Province.

16 November– Nine bombs exploded in the Muang, Yaring, and Yarang Districts. In the Nong Chik District, a military outpost came under assault rifle fire. In the Panare District, rebels attacked with grenades. In the aftermath of the attacks, only minor damage was recorded.

20 November– In Narathiwat Province, a 50–man Thahan Phran unit from the 46th regiment got into a 30–minute gunfight with four to five groups of RKK insurgents, resulting the death of a key leader of the RKK. He had a bounty of over one million baht on his head and was responsible for numerous attacks, including one on the same regiment a year ago. Two other insurgents were captured as well.

21 November– An explosive device detonated outside a laundry shop on Charoen Pradit Road, Pattani, injuring nine people. Another bomb injured six policemen escorting monks in the Muang District. Insurgents blew up power poles in the Than To District.

1 December– A police task force apprehended a RKK insurgent instructor in the Yarang District of the Yala province. Meanwhile, a soldier, Private Kriangkrai Pornhormfai, was killed after stepping on a mine, and another, Siam Sealao, was seriously wounded.

5 December– A 40–man Thahan Phran unit of the 45th regiment apprehended three suspected insurgents. A shotgun, along with drugs, were confiscated in the process. The arrest occurred in Narathiwat Province.

=== 2012 ===
1 February– A Thahan Phran, Thanong Sinthu, was shot in Pattani Province.

3 February– An illegal oil trader was shot in Bacho District, Narathiwat Province. In a separate incident in Pattani Province a woman was killed and her husband and son were injured. Deep South Watch announced 33 dead and 55 injured in January as a result of clashes in south Thailand, with no insurgent casualties.

4 February– A truck driver, Mahama Yakee, was shot in Pattani Province early in the morning.

21 February– In Panare District, Pattani Province, three insurgents were killed after they clashed with the 44th regiment Thahan Phran, while three rangers were injured and two AK–47 rifles were seized. In Rueso District, Narathiwat Province, a former PULO leader was shot dead at his home. He has been known to have been approached by many RKK members to join their cause but he refused. Finally, in Si Sakhon District, Narathiwat Province, a 100–man Thahan Phran unit from the 46th regiment clashed with around 10 insurgents resulting in one ranger, Sgt Rithidej Sriruangdej, seriously wounded, and key insurgent, wanted for many arrest warrants, killed.

28 February– In Raman District, Yala Province, soldiers from the 12th special task force clashed with three insurgents, resulting the death of a key insurgent wanted on multiple charges and the apprehension of another insurgent.

5 March– A blast at a market in the Tak Bai District wounded eight.

7 March– Four soldiers and a rubber tapper were killed in two separate attacks in Narathiwat and Pattani Provinces. Two days later at least 50 militants attacked an army base in Yala Province, shooting electricity poles down to block escape routes, kidnapping 2 soldiers and injuring 12 more. The missing officers were later discovered shot to death with their hands bound and their weapons gone.

10 March– A local politician was shot dead by an M–16 assault rifle and 9 mm pistol in Pattani's Ka Por District by a group of four or five assailants in a sedan.

12 March– Two soldiers were wounded by a bomb explosion while providing security for teachers in Pattani's Sai Buri District. In Yarang District, an unknown number of persons set afire the office of the Rawaeng Sub–district Tambon Administration Organisation.

15 March– A motorcycle bomb exploded in Pattani, killing one villager and wounding three others including two soldiers.

17 March– A school girl was killed and four others injured, two critically, in a roadside bomb attack apparently intended for soldiers in Pattani.

19 March– A member of a village security team was shot dead in Pattani's Yaring District.

21 March– The Thai army has accepted responsibility for killing four innocent civilians in the insurgency–plagued south two months ago.

25 March– An assistant village head in Narathiwat and a defence volunteer in Pattani were killed in drive–by shootings. A policeman was shot dead by militants in Pattani's Yarang District.

29 March– A security guard was killed in a drive–by shooting in Pattani's Muang District.

31 March– Four bombs exploded in Yala shopping districts and the parking lot of a hotel in Hat Yai, killing 16 and injuring more than 300 others.

3 April– A police officer from the Muang Pattani police station was seriously wounded by a gunman at a fishing pier in Moo 6 of tambon Samilae in Pattani's Muang District.

4 April– Two men on a motorcycle hurled a grenade at a PTT gas station at Ban Pongsata in Pattani's Yarang District.

5 April– A car care shop owner was killed and his son seriously injured in a shooting in Pattani's Yaring District.

11 April– Three villagers were killed when gunmen opened fire at them as they were leaving a mosque in Pattani's Panare District.

13 April– Five passengers were wounded when gunmen on motorcycles attacked a bus in Pattani's Sai Buri District.

15 April– Police seized large numbers of weapons including four M16 assault rifles in Sai Buri District, Pattani Province.

19 April– A 100–man unit clashed with a 14 insurgents in Yala Province, resulting the death of five insurgents. The others managed to escape. After some forensic work, it was revealed that one of the dead insurgents was a leader wanted on over seven charges. Meanwhile, in Narathiwat Province, a 30–man Thahan Phran unit from the 45th regiment apprehended two RKK members wanted for shooting two teachers in 2010. In a separate incident, a bomb detonated, injuring five soldiers in the same province.

22 April– An insurgent was shot dead by combined police and Thahan Phran forces after resisting arrest in Rueso District, Narathiwat Province.

24 April– Village chief Sainung Ada was shot dead in Narathiwat Province. In Tak Bai District, a bomb detonated injuring three civilians and five soldiers. A 5–year–old boy was among the injured.

23 July– A rubber tapper, Prinya Sinbut, was shot twice in the body and once in the arm, and is seriously wounded in Mae Lan District, Pattani Province.

25 July– After a warning that insurgents would intensify attacks during Ramadan, five anti–drug officers were killed and one seriously injured in a car bomb in Raman District. Authorities believe it was in retaliation for recent drug suspect arrests.

26 July– Two men, Seng Changkid, and Kittisak Chamnanlee were slain after they left their house in Bannang Sata District and an assistant village headman, Haree Vaebuesar, was shot dead in an ambush in Raman District. All three events occurred in Yala Province.

28 July– Four soldiers were killed in an ambush by 16 militants.

29 July– Five civilians, all around Yala Province, were shot dead by insurgents. In addition, four soldiers were wounded in an attack in the same province.

11 September– Over 100 insurgents, including a leader, Jae A–Lee, from the group Badan Penyelarasan Wawasan Baru Melayu Patani, surrendered to military authorities, demanding justice in exchange for halting the insurgency. Jae A–Lee also claimed that two other core leaders are in the process of submitting to the military. Jae A–Lee's one million baht bounty, as a result of the deaths of four soldiers on 4 January, has also been whitewashed.

=== 2013 ===
According to the region's Internal Security Operations Command, there were 320 bombings in the four border provinces between January and December 2013, compared with 276 reported bombings in 2012. Experts alleged that the rise in deaths was linked to the stalling of peace talks while Yingluck Shinawatra's government faced anti–government protests in Bangkok and court proceedings against it over corruption.

10 February– Insurgents killed five soldiers and wounded five others in two roadside bomb attacks in Yala Province. According to Thai military officials, in the first attack militants detonated a car bomb as a truck carrying six soldiers passed by. Then they opened fire on the soldiers killing five of them, and taking away the dead soldiers' rifles.

13 February– At least 17 Muslim insurgents including a commander were killed during an attack on a military base in Narathiwat.None of the Thai military defenders of the base were hurt.

12 April– Two soldiers were killed and six others wounded in a road side bombing. Suspected militants detonated an improvised bomb hidden on the road surface in Pattani Province's Panarae District. The soldiers were in two armoured vehicles travelling to inspect damages from an earlier militant attack. One of the personnel carriers was badly damaged.

26 April– Four soldiers were killed and another four seriously injured while attempting to defuse a bomb. According to Thai authorities, the blast happened after troops moved the device which was hidden under a gas tank and placed under a bridge near the Narathiwat military base.

1 May– Police say suspected insurgents have killed six people including a two–year–old boy in Thailand's south.

Peace talks were also started in Kuala Lumpur in February at the behest of Malaysia. Barisan Revolusi Nasional's Hassan Taib led the talks, while the Thai government team was led by Secretary–General of the National Security Council Lieutenant General Paradon Pattanatabut. However, the exiled leader of the Pattani United Liberation Organisation, Kasturi Mahkota, said attacks by his group would continue if they were not invited to the talks. For his part, Pattanatabut said that Thailand would not agree to independence or any contravention of the constitution of Thailand, but would seek to discuss degrees of autonomy and an amnesty with the rebels.

21 June– Two persons were killed and five others were wounded in three separate assaults in Yala and Pattani provinces.

2 October–A roadside bomb detonated near a Royal Thai Armed Forces teacher escort unit in Sa–ae village, Krong Pinang district, Yala province. At least 4 soldiers were killed and 3 civilians were wounded in the blast, no group claimed the attack; however, sources attributed the attack to the Aba Cheali Group.

=== 2014 ===
9 February– A policeman's wife was shot dead and then set on fire in front of a crowd at a busy market in Pattani. The woman, 28, was shot down on the afternoon of 9 February as she returned to her car from a market in the Ratapanyang area of Pattani Province. After being shot, the woman's body was set alight. The attack was allegedly carried out in revenge for the deaths of three Muslim brothers, aged three, five and nine, that took place during the week of 2 February. The boys were shot in front of their home in neighbouring Narathiwat Province. Their pregnant mother and father were also shot in the attack but survived. Srisompob Jitpiromsri, at Prince of Songkhla University in Pattani, said the boys' deaths "have set off a chain–reaction which will be hard to control unless authorities can bring to justice their killers". "The insurgent movement is taking their deaths as an opportunity for revenge. Local feelings over this are running very high," he said.

14 March– Siriporn Srichai, a female schoolteacher, was shot dead and her body was burned in Mayo District of Pattani Province.

24 May– Three people were killed and about 80 injured in 13 bomb blasts at at least five 7/Eleven stores and two gas stations.

28 May– Violence continued in Pattani as a bomb blast at a hospital car park injured 10 people including a soldier. Those injured included Pvt Phonlawat Nonthasen. The most seriously wounded in attacks that have left two dead and more than 70 wounded was a three–year–old girl, Vaesiteeaija Vaelong maimed for life when doctors had to amputate the remains of her right leg after it was mangled by the blast.

28 August– Patimoh Saemaesae, a female schoolteacher, was killed and another teacher and a policeman were wounded in a bomb attack directed at the teachers and their police escort in Khok Pho District of Pattani Province.

5 September– A paramilitary volunteer's attempt to portray an unarmed 14–year–old Muslim boy falsely as an armed insurgent after killing him has come under investigation by the junta.

12 October– A total of six schools were destroyed by fire in six coordinated arson attacks in Thung Yang Daeng and Mayo Districts of Pattani Province; some of the arsonists were subsequently arrested and confessed that their intention had been to set fire to 14 schools, but residents had managed to contact the authorities before they could carry out more arson attacks.

4 November– The military decides to arm civilian groups by distributing thousands of assault rifles allegedly to help civilians to fight against the public order disturbing outfits. Human rights groups have protested against this measure, which in their eyes will only make the situation worse.

29 November– Katesaya Muenkoto, a 29–year–old woman died of bullet wounds in Khok Pho District in Pattani Province. She and a man were shot at while they were buying meat from a shop in the early morning. The attacker was driving a motorcycle and shot at them six times, hitting the woman in the head and the man in the back.

=== 2015 ===
9 January– Three insurgents were slain and two others detained, as security forces raided a religious school in Mayo District, Pattani Province.

13 January– A motorcycle bomb exploded damaging the vehicle carrying the Chanae District chief of Narathiwat Province. The officer and the other four occupants of the vehicle escaped unhurt.

19 January– A bomb planted in a drain exploded in Narathiwat town while a convoy of vehicles escorting teachers was passing by in Ban Buecho village, Bacho District, Narathiwat Province, in the morning. One teacher was wounded.

31 January– A militant ambush conducted on the Pattani–Hat Yai road resulted in the death of a senior police officer; three police were also wounded.

4 February– A 25 kg gas–cylinder bomb exploded in Chanae District, Narathiwat Province, as a truck carrying ten police officers was passing by. All policemen escaped unhurt.

19 February– A series of car and motorcycle bombs exploded in Narathiwat town. Thirteen persons were wounded and at least 20 buildings were damaged. One of the string of bombs planted failed to explode.

1 March– A large–scale security operation took place in the districts of Pak Phanang, Cha–uat, Thung Song, Chian Yai, Nop Phitam, Tha Sala, Phipun, Muang, Ron Phibun, and Chulabhorn. It resulted in the seizure of 35 weapons, 1,041 rounds of ammunition, and 265 methamphetamine pills.

2 March– A military spokesman stated that the 1st, 2nd, and 3rd Armies will begin withdrawing from the Pattani, Yala, and Narathiwat Provinces in April. The move came as part of the ongoing peace negotiations between the rebels and the government.

20 March– A 25 kg gas–cylinder bomb exploded by the roadside in Ban Khok village, Tambon Chuap, Cho–airong District, Narathiwat Province, when a police vehicle passed by. The two officers escaped unhurt.

30 March– A homemade bomb exploded by the roadside in Rueso District, Narathiwat Province, as a police patrol team passed by. Two officers were injured.

1 April– Four bombs exploded in the centre of Pattani town in the early morning hours causing material damage, but no casualties.

2 April– Two unidentified men were murdered by gunmen while hunting in Rangae District, Narathiwat Province. They were attacked and their guns were stolen while they were carrying home a wild boar they had killed.

4 April– Two bombs exploded in Narathiwat Province, one in Chanae District and the other in Cho–airong District. The first one was a gas–cylinder bomb planted next to the Chang Phueak tambon administration. The other targeted paramilitary rangers in Luborya village. Their vehicle was damaged, but the officers escaped unhurt.

=== 2016 ===
13 March– A group of armed and masked insurgents took over Joh Airong Hospital in Narathiwat Province.

6 June– A village chief and his assistant was killed by suspected insurgents in Narathiwat Province.

5 July– Several attacks occurred during Ramadan.

25 July– Militants ambushed the village chief Asae Niseng and a Territorial Defense Volunteer, on a village road in Kampong Yingor, Bannang Sata district. The attack leave the village chief and one wounded.

6 September– A bomb attack in front of a school in Tak Bai, Narathiwat, kills two and injures eight persons.

2–3 November– Coordinated bomb–and–gun attacks in Thailand's strife–torn southern region in Pattani Province have left at least three people dead. The attacks late on 2 November and early the next day appeared to be in retaliation for stepped–up security operations taken against insurgents and were not aimed at the monarchy.

4 November– One man was shot dead in Waeng District, another in the Rueso District

1 December– One soldier was killed and three others were injured in an early morning explosion in Thailand's Muslim majority south in Yala Province.

6 December– Suspected insurgents shot dead six people in a series of attacks carried out in Thailand's deep south in the provinces of Pattani and Narathiwat.

11 December– Four border patrol police officers were hospitalized in the town of Narathiwat in the south when a remote–controlled bomb exploded near their vehicle.

15 December– A villager was shot dead in Thailand's Muslim south in Songkhla Province in Saba Yoi District, as he was preparing to harvest rubber sap at his plantation.

30 December– A car bombing and a shooting, militants ambushed the car of a 51–year–old villager who was driving along a local road, have shaken Thailand's majority Muslim south, local authorities in Su–ngai Padi District, Narathiwat Province confirmed.

=== 2017 ===
- 2 March – Four members of a family were killed including an eight–year–old boy and two other children wounded in an ambush in Narathiwat Province. The assailants fled the scene.
- 3 March – Three Thai soldiers were gunned down at a busy evening market by suspected militants in Mayo District of Pattani Province. A security guard was shot dead in Ban Buketkong village of tambon Lubo Yirai. A group representing 300 Buddhist leaders and activists in the south called on the prime minister, as leader of the National Council for Peace and Order (NCPO), to invoke Section 44 of the interim charter to tackle the insurgency in the provinces of Yala, Pattani, and Narathiwat.
- 29 March – A gunfight occurred after a pickup truck tried to escape from a police checkpoint and its passengers began shooting at officers. The police fired back, killing two people. The two dead were suspected of being responsible for an attack in early March that killed four people.
- 30 March –
  - One police officer was killed and four or five others were injured in a drive–by shooting by militants in the Ra–ngae District of Narathiwat Province.
  - The body of army ranger, Saifru Hasimae, was found in Yala Province. No motive for his killing has been established.
  - Separately, five gunmen opened fire on a police station in Narathiwat Province, killing a policeman and wounding three others. Pol Col Surapong Chatsuth said the attack appeared to be retaliation for a gun battle on 29 March at a police checkpoint that resulted in the deaths of two gunmen.
- 3 April – At least twenty insurgents attack a security checkpoint during the early hours in Krong Pinang District, Yala Province which wounds twelve police officers. The Runda Kumpulan Kecil (RKK) insurgent group were suspected behind the attack.
- 20 April – Two insurgents were killed after a bomb they were transporting prematurely exploded, the military said. Among the dead are insurgent operation leaders.
- 6 May – A border patrol police officer was wounded in a roadside bomb blast near the Sungai Kolok River in Tak Bai district, authorities said.
- 9 May – 2017 Pattani bombing– Sixty people were confirmed injured when two bombs went off at Big C Supercenter in Muang district. A canvas vendor was killed before his truck was stolen to be used as the bomb delivery system.
- 22 May – A small bomb struck military–run Phramongkutklao Hospital in Bangkok, wounding more than 20 people.
- 23 May – Attackers in southern Thailand fatally shot two army rangers at close range Tuesday, police said, the latest killings in a region that has been plagued by a long–running Muslim separatist insurgency.
- 19 June – Six soldiers were killed and four wounded when a bomb planted on a dirt road in Pattani province exploded.
- 15 July – Two policeman and one civilian were wounded after a motorcycles bomb exploded on Ban Pupor bridge in Narathiwat as a police petrol was acrossing the bridge.
- 20 July – A policeman was killed and another seriously wounded when a police checkpoint in Narathiwat’s Bacho district was attacked with pipe bombs.
- 17 August – A car dealership was raided by militants and five stolen cars turned into bombs in Songkhla’s Na Thawi district. Four employees were taken hostage and one of them shot dead.
- 14 September – Two soldiers died and 27 other people were wounded, including two civilians, as suspected rebels ambushed an army patrol in Thailand’s violence–stricken deep south.

=== 2018 ===
- 22 January – Three people were killed and 22 wounded when a motorcycle bomb exploded in the pork–selling area of Pimolchai market in Yala Province's Muang district. According to local police, a young man parked the motorcycle near a pork stall in the early morning and left.
- 6 February – A defence volunteer, a school–mum and a young student were wounded when a bomb exploded near a school in Yala’s Yaha district.
- 11 February – Six bomb blasts in the Pattani province left nine people, including the Yaring district chief, injured.
- 15 February – Three female students and three local security volunteers were injured when a bomb exploded near a primary school in the Mueang Yala district in Yala province.

=== 2019 ===
- 6 November – Fifteen people were killed at a security checkpoint in Lam Phaya sub–district, Mueang Yala District when it was attacked by insurgents. The attackers stole the weapons of their victims.

=== 2020 ===
- 17 March – At least 25 people were injured in a “double–tap” bombing by BRN insurgents outside the Southern Border Provinces Administrative Center.
- 13 August – A roadside bomb killed a security officer in the predominantly Muslim province of Pattani in Thailand’s southern border region alongside Malaysia.
- 14 August – Thai army troops killed 2 people suspected of planting the roadside bomb that killed the security officer on 13 August. One of whom being a leading member of the RKK.
- 15 August – Thai soldiers killed 3 suspected insurgents during 2 clashes.
- 17 August – A gunfight broke out between suspected insurgents and Thai troops leading to an unknown number of deaths.
- 1 October – One soldier was killed and six others were injured when suspected insurgents detonated a roadside bomb hitting a column of vehicles carrying troops in Thepa.

=== 2024 ===
- 20 November – Three people were injured by a grenade attack in Thepha district.

=== 2025 ===
- 13 January – Seven people, involving one Malaysian and six volunteer defense personnel, were injured in Pattani after a bomb attached to a motorcycle exploded near the Mueang Pattani District Police Station at around 8 am.
- 28 April – Three people were killed and another is severely injured overnight in two separate attacks by suspected Islamist insurgents in Bannang Sata district, Yala province, Thailand.

=== 2026 ===
An attack killed 5 Task Force Ranger Regiment 45 members manning the Buket Sami checkpoint in Narathiwat Province. 3 AK47 rifles were also taken.
