= Mueang Narathiwat district =

Mueang Narathiwat เมืองนราธิวาส
- District
- District location in Narathiwat province
- Coordinates: 6°25′34″N 101°49′23″E
- Country: Thailand
- Province: Narathiwat
- Seat: Bang Nak

Area
  - Total: 305.115 km^{2} (117.806 sq mi)

Population (2005)
  - Total: 108,644
  - Density: 356.1/km^{2} (922/sq mi)
- Time zone: UTC+7 (ICT)
- Postal code: 96000
- Geocode: 9601

Mueang Narathiwat (Thai: เมืองนราธิวาส, pronounced [mɯ̄a̯ŋ nā.rāː.tʰí.wâːt]; Pattani Malay: นารอ, pronounced [nā.rɔ]) is the capital district (amphoe mueang) of Narathiwat province, southern Thailand.

== History ==
The area of Mueang Narathiwat was originally a village named Menara (เมอนารา or เมอนารอ), under Mueang Sai Buri. Later it was upgraded to a tambon and changed to be controlled by Mueang Ra-ngae. Tambon Manalo grew bigger, so the government moved the city hall from Tambon Tanyong Mat to Manalo. Then they upgraded Tambon Manalo to Mueang Bang Nara. King Vajiravudh (Rama VI) renamed the city Narathiwat in 1915, however in 1917 the district was renamed from Mueang to the old name, Bang Nara. In 1938 the district name was changed to Mueang Narathiwat District.

== Geography ==
Neighboring districts are (from the southeast clockwise): Tak Bai, Cho-airong, Ra-ngae, Yi-ngo, and Bacho of Narathiwat Province; Mai Kaen of Pattani province and the Gulf of Thailand.

The important water resource is the Bang Nara River.

Ao Manao-Khao Tanyong National Park is in the district.

== Administration ==
The district is divided into seven sub-districts (tambons), which are further subdivided into 57 villages (mubans). The town (thesaban mueang) Narathiwat covers parts of tambon Bang Nak. The six remaining tambons are each led by a tambon administrative organization (TAO).

No.	Name	Thai name	Villages	Pop.
1.	Bang Nak	บางนาค	-	40,406
2.	Lamphu	ลำภู	11	10,543
3.	Manang Tayo	มะนังตายอ	7	7,721
4.	Bang Po	บางปอ	8	9,844
5.	Kaluwo	กะลุวอ	7	8,382
6.	Kaluwo Nuea	กะลุวอเหนือ	12	13,575
7.	Khok Khian	โคกเคียน	12	18,173
