= Pateemoh Sadeeyamu =

Thai civil servant

- พาตีเมาะ สะดียามู

Governor of Pattani Province
- Incumbent
- Assumed office 15 November 2022
- Preceded by: Rashit Sudpum

Pateemoh Sadeeyamu (Thai: พาตีเมาะ สะดียามู, RTGS: Phatimo Sadiyamu) (Note: Other spellings include Patimoh Sadiyamu and Patimo Sadiyamu) is a Thai civil servant, serving as Governor of Pattani Province since 2022. Pateemoh is the first Muslim woman to be appointed governor of a Thai province.

== Early life and education ==
Pateemoh was born in Yala province. She holds a master's degree from the Social Development Yala program at the National Institute of Development Administration.

== Career ==
Pateemoh's tenure has focused on female empowerment in Southern Thailand.

Following a rise in violence in Southern Thailand in early 2025, Pateemoh called for peace at the onset of Ramadan in February 2025.
