= Raman district =

Raman รามัน
- District
- District location in Yala province
- Coordinates: 6°28′42″N 101°25′27″E
- Country: Thailand
- Province: Yala
- Seat: Kayuboko

Area
  - Total: 516.1 km^{2} (199.3 sq mi)

Population (2014)
  - Total: 91,850
  - Density: 142.2/km^{2} (368/sq mi)
- Time zone: UTC+7 (ICT)
- Postal code: 95140
- Geocode: 9506

Raman (Thai: รามัน, pronounced [rāː.mān]; Malay: Reman, Jawi: رمان ) is a district (amphoe) in the northeastern part of Yala province, southern Thailand.

== History ==
The name Raman is a Thai corruption of Reman (Jawi: رمان), its original Malay name. Mueang Raman was one of seven kingdoms, into which the Sultanate of Patani was split at the beginning of the 19th century to reduce the power of the Sultan of Patani after a series of rebellions against the Siamese rule. Tuan Mansor was appointed the first ruler and resided in Kotabaru.

In 1917 the district was renamed from Raman to Kotabaru, the seat of administration. In 1938 it was given back its historic name.

Seven sub-districts are scheduled to be split off to form the new district Kotabaru in 2015.

== Geography ==
Neighboring districts are (from the north clockwise): Yarang, Thung Yang Daeng, and Kapho of Pattani province; Bacho and Rueso of Narathiwat province; and Bannang Sata, Krong Pinang, and Mueang Yala of Yala Province.

== Administration ==
=== Central administration ===
Raman is divided into 16 sub-districts (tambons), which are further subdivided into 90 administrative villages (mubans).

No.	Name	Thai	Villages	Pop.
1.	Kayuboko	กายูบอเกาะ	6	9,447
2.	Kalupang	กาลูปัง	4	2,988
3.	Kalo	กาลอ	4	3,208
4.	Koto Tuera	กอตอตือร๊ะ	5	5,490
5.	Kota Baru	โกตาบารู	4	5,418
6.	Kero	เกะรอ	7	7,374
7.	Cha-kwa	จะกว๊ะ	6	6,275
8.	Tha Thong	ท่าธง	7	6,983
9.	Noen Ngam	เนินงาม	7	6,616
10.	Balo	บาลอ	7	5,386
11.	Ba-ngoi	บาโงย	4	2,770
12.	Buemang	บือมัง	6	5,812
13.	Yata	ยะต๊ะ	5	5,374
14.	Wang Phaya	วังพญา	7	6,759
15.	A-song	อาซ่อง	6	5,428
16.	Talo Halo	ตะโล๊ะหะลอ	5	6,522

=== Local administration ===
There are three sub-district municipalities (thesaban tambon) in the district:

- Mueang Raman (Thai: เทศบาลตำบลเมืองรามันห์) consisting of parts of sub-district Kayuboko.
- Kotabaru (Thai: เทศบาลตำบลโกตาบารู) consisting of sub-district Kota Baru.
- Balo (Thai: เทศบาลตำบลบาลอ) consisting of sub-district Balo.

There are 14 subdistrict administrative organizations (SAO) in the district:

- Kayu Boko (Thai: องค์การบริหารส่วนตำบลกายูบอเกาะ) consisting of parts of sub-district Kayu Boko.
- Kalupang (Thai: องค์การบริหารส่วนตำบลกาลูปัง) consisting of sub-district Kalupang.
- Kalo (Thai: องค์การบริหารส่วนตำบลกาลอ) consisting of sub-district Kalo.
- Koto Tuera (Thai: องค์การบริหารส่วนตำบลกอตอตือร๊ะ) consisting of sub-district Koto Tuera.
- Kero (Thai: องค์การบริหารส่วนตำบลเกะรอ) consisting of sub-district Kero.
- Cha-kwa (Thai: องค์การบริหารส่วนตำบลจะกว๊ะ) consisting of sub-district Cha-kwa.
- Tha Thong (Thai: องค์การบริหารส่วนตำบลท่าธง) consisting of sub-district Tha Thong.
- Noen Ngam (Thai: องค์การบริหารส่วนตำบลเนินงาม) consisting of sub-district Noen Ngam.
- Ba-ngoi (Thai: องค์การบริหารส่วนตำบลบาโงย) consisting of sub-district Ba-ngoi.
- Buemang (Thai: องค์การบริหารส่วนตำบลบือมัง) consisting of sub-district Buemang.
- Yata (Thai: องค์การบริหารส่วนตำบลยะต๊ะ) consisting of sub-district Yata.
- Wang Phaya (Thai: องค์การบริหารส่วนตำบลวังพญา) consisting of sub-district Wang Phaya.
- A-song (Thai: องค์การบริหารส่วนตำบลอาซ่อง) consisting of sub-district A-song.
- Talo Halo (Thai: องค์การบริหารส่วนตำบลตะโล๊ะหะลอ) consisting of sub-district Talo Halo.
