= Mai Kaen district =

Mai Kaen ไม้แก่น
- District
- District location in Pattani province
- Coordinates: 6°36′36″N 101°40′2″E
- Country: Thailand
- Province: Pattani
- Seat: Sai Thong

Area
  - Total: 55.201 km^{2} (21.313 sq mi)

Population (2005)
  - Total: 11,269
  - Density: 204.1/km^{2} (529/sq mi)
- Time zone: UTC+7 (ICT)
- Postal code: 94220
- Geocode: 9408

Mai Kaen (Thai: ไม้แก่น, pronounced [máːj kɛ̀n]) is the southeasternmost district (amphoe) of Pattani province, southern Thailand.

== History ==
The minor district (king amphoe) Mae Kaen was formed on 15 November 1973 by splitting the two tambons Sai Thong and Mai Kaen from Sai Buri district. On 4 July 1994 it was upgraded to a full district.

== Geography ==
Neighboring districts are (from the south clockwise): Mueang Narathiwat and Bacho of Narathiwat province and Sai Buri of Pattani Province. To the east is the Gulf of Thailand.

== Administration ==
The district is divided into four sub-districts (tambons), which are further subdivided into 17 villages (mubans). There are no municipal (thesabans). There are three tambon administrative organizations (TAO).

No.	Name	Thai name	Villages	Pop.
1.	Saithong	ไทรทอง	5	4,369
2.	Mai Kaen	ไม้แก่น	4	1,822
3.	Talo Kraithong	ตะโละไกรทอง	4	2,331
4.	Donsai	ดอนทราย	4	2,747
