= Manang Tayo =

Manang Tayo มะนังตายอ
- Tambon
- Interactive map of Manang Tayo
- Country: Thailand
- Province: Narathiwat
- Amphoe: Mueang Narathiwat District
- Time zone: UTC+7 (ICT)

Manang Tayo (Thai: มะนังตายอ) is a sub-district and small town in Mueang Narathiwat District of Narathiwat Province, Thailand. It lies between Rangae and Narathiwat town.
