= Bacho district =

Bacho บาเจาะ
- District
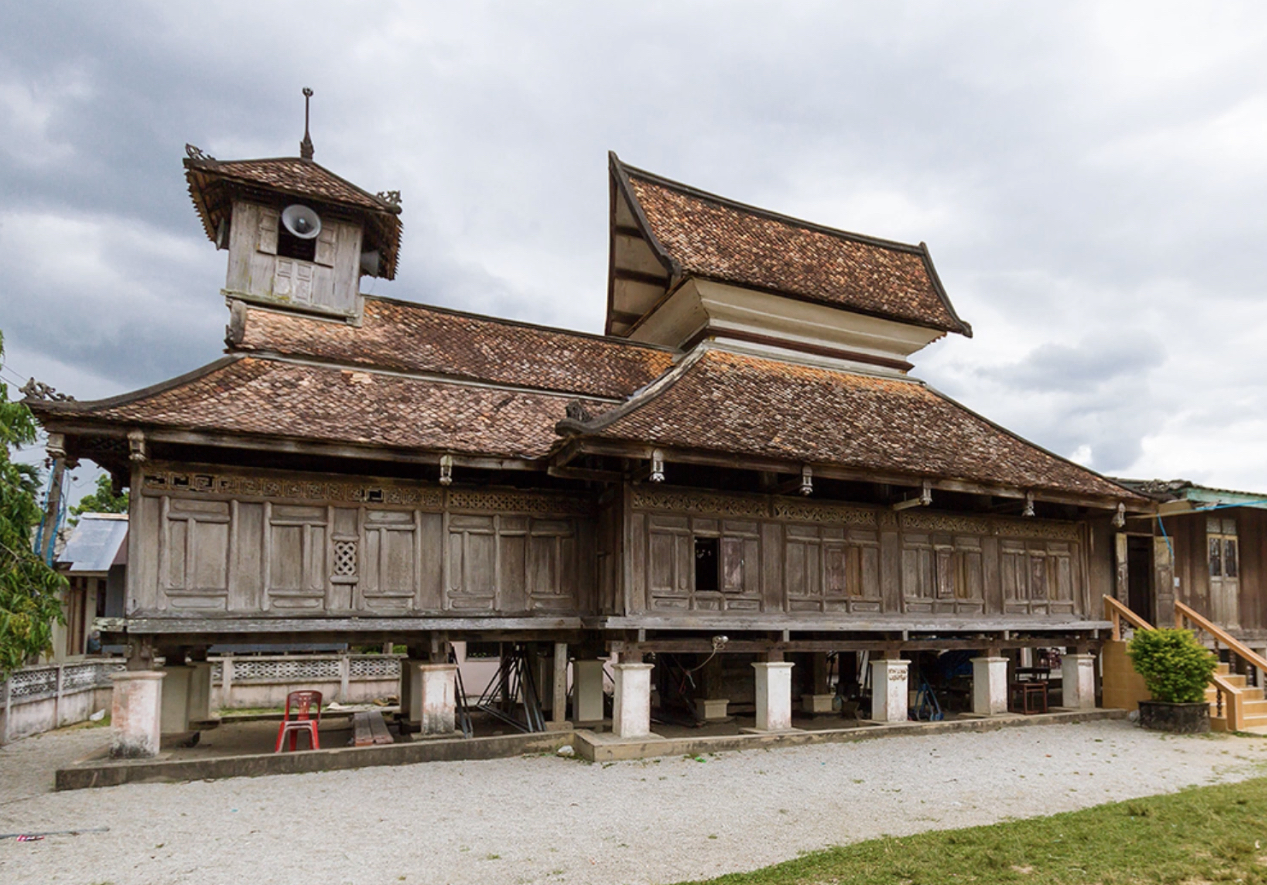
- Talo Mano Mosque

- District location in Narathiwat province
- Coordinates: 6°31′1″N 101°39′6″E
- Country: Thailand
- Province: Narathiwat
- Seat: Bacho
- Tambon: 6
- Muban: 46

Area
  - Total: 171.68 km^{2} (66.29 sq mi)

Population (2014)
  - Total: 52,288
  - Density: 283.1/km^{2} (733/sq mi)
- Time zone: UTC+7 (ICT)
- Postal code: 96170
- Geocode: 9603

Bacho (Thai: บาเจาะ, pronounced [bāː.tɕɔ̀ʔ]) is the northernmost district (amphoe) of Narathiwat province, southern Thailand.

== History ==
In 1908 the district was established as the minor district (king amphoe) Champako (จำปากอ), which was upgraded to a full district the following year. In 1917 the district was renamed Bacho.

The district was part of Sai Buri Province, which was abolished in 1932. While Sai Buri District came to Pattani Province, Bacho was added to Narathiwat.

In 1975, five Thai Malays were killed by Thai soldiers and their bodies thrown over a bridge into the Saiburi in Bacho district. The incident, known as Koto Bridge incident, sparked a massive demonstration in Pattani province, lasting 45 days.

== Geography ==
Neighboring districts are (from the east clockwise) Mueang Narathiwat, Yi-ngo, and Rueso of Narathiwat Province, Raman of Yala province, and Kapho, Sai Buri, and Mai Kaen of Pattani province.

Budo–Su-ngai Padi National Park is in the mountains at the border of Yala and Pattani.

== Administration ==
=== Central administration ===
Bacho district is divided into six sub-districts (tambons), which are further subdivided into 46 administrative villages (mubans).

No.	Name	Thai	Villages	Pop.
1.	Bacho	บาเจาะ	8	13,060
2.	Lubo Sawo	ลุโบะสาวอ	7	6,892
3.	Kayo Mati	กาเยาะมาตี	6	6,866
4.	Paluka Samo	ปะลุกาสาเมาะ	11	12,559
5.	Bare Nuea	บาเระเหนือ	7	6,206
6.	Bare Tai	บาเระใต้	7	6,705

=== Local administration ===
There are two sub-district municipalities (thesaban tambons) in the district:

- Ton Sai (Thai: เทศบาลตำบลต้นไทร) consisting of parts of sub-district Paluka Samo.
- Bacho (Thai: เทศบาลตำบลบาเจาะ) consisting of parts of sub-district Bacho.

There are six sub-district administrative organizations (SAO) in the district:

- Bacho (Thai: องค์การบริหารส่วนตำบลบาเจาะ) consisting of parts of sub-district Bacho.
- Lubo Sawo (Thai: องค์การบริหารส่วนตำบลลุโบะสาวอ) consisting of sub-district Lubo Sawo.
- Kayo Mati (Thai: องค์การบริหารส่วนตำบลกาเยาะมาตี) consisting of sub-district Kayo Mati.
- Paluka Samo (Thai: องค์การบริหารส่วนตำบลปะลุกาสาเมาะ) consisting of parts of sub-district Paluka Samo.
- Bare Nuea (Thai: องค์การบริหารส่วนตำบลบาเระเหนือ) consisting of sub-district Bare Nuea.
- Bare Tai (Thai: องค์การบริหารส่วนตำบลบาเระใต้) consisting of sub-district Bare Tai.
