= Sai Buri district =

Sai Buri สายบุรี
- District
- District location in Pattani province
- Coordinates: 6°42′5″N 101°37′3″E
- Country: Thailand
- Province: Pattani
- Seat: Taluban

Area
  - Total: 178.424 km^{2} (68.890 sq mi)

Population (2009)
  - Total: 64,260
  - Density: 353.6/km^{2} (916/sq mi)
- Time zone: UTC+7 (ICT)
- Postal code: 94110
- Geocode: 9407

Sai Buri (Thai: สายบุรี, pronounced [sǎːj bū.rīː]) is a district (amphoe) in Pattani province, southern Thailand.

The local Malay people call it Teluban (Jawi: تلوبن), which is also the name of the only municipal area of the district, or Selindung Bayu (Jawi: سليندوڠ بايو), the Malay and Sanskrit word for 'wind shelter'.

== Geography ==
Neighboring districts are (from the southeast clockwise): Mai Kaen of Pattani Province; Bacho of Narathiwat province; Kapho, Thung Yang Daeng, and Panare of Pattani. To the east is the Gulf of Thailand.

== History ==
Map of Sai Buri in 1900 as a province

Sai Buri was one of the seven mueangs into which the Pattani sultanate was split. In the thesaphiban administrative reforms at the beginning of the 20th century it became a province within the Monthon Pattani. In 1909 the area of the province was reduced by reassigning Yi-Ngo and modern-day Mueang Narathiwat Districts to Mueang Bang Nara, now Narathiwat Province. In 1932 the province was abolished, the northern half was added to Pattani Province and the southern part to Narathiwat.

Originally simply named "Mueang", the district was renamed "Taluban" in 1917. In 1938 the district was renamed "Sai Buri".

Sai Buri's Chinatown or Sai Buri's old town zone known locally as Cino Kampong. It is a Kelantan-Pattani Malay dialect, the word Cino means Chinese and Kampong means rural area. So it means "Chinatown in suburb area". The area has been a community for 200–300 years. Sai Buri used to be an important commercial port in this part of the country. It so has suitable beach to anchor the ships during monsoon. The Chinese merchants came for trading. The first Chinese race who settled here was Hokkien.

The highlight of Cino Kampong is the historic buildings, most of which are two-story half-timbered half-concrete shophouses built in the Sino-Malay architecture style, called "Cino Kampong", the only ones in the country and one-third of the world.

== Administration ==
The district is divided into 11 sub-districts (tambons), which are further subdivided into 64 villages (mubans). Taluban is a sub-district municipality (thesaban tambon), which encompasses tambon Taluban. Each of the other sub-districts has a tambon administrative organization (TAO).

No.	Name	Thai	Muban	Pop.
1.	Taluban	ตะลุบัน	-	13,797
2.	Tabing	ตะบิ้ง	6	5,835
3.	Pase Yawo	ปะเสยะวอ	7	7,754
4.	Bang Kao	บางเก่า	4	3,166
5.	Buere	บือเระ	4	2,950
6.	Trobon	เตราะบอน	11	7,648
7.	Kadunong	กะดุนง	8	5,000
8.	Lahan	ละหาร	5	4,972
9.	Manang Dalam	มะนังดาลำ	6	6,776
10.	Paen	แป้น	8	4,555
11.	Thungkhla	ทุ่งคล้า	5	1,807
