= Panare district =

Panare ปะนาเระ
- District
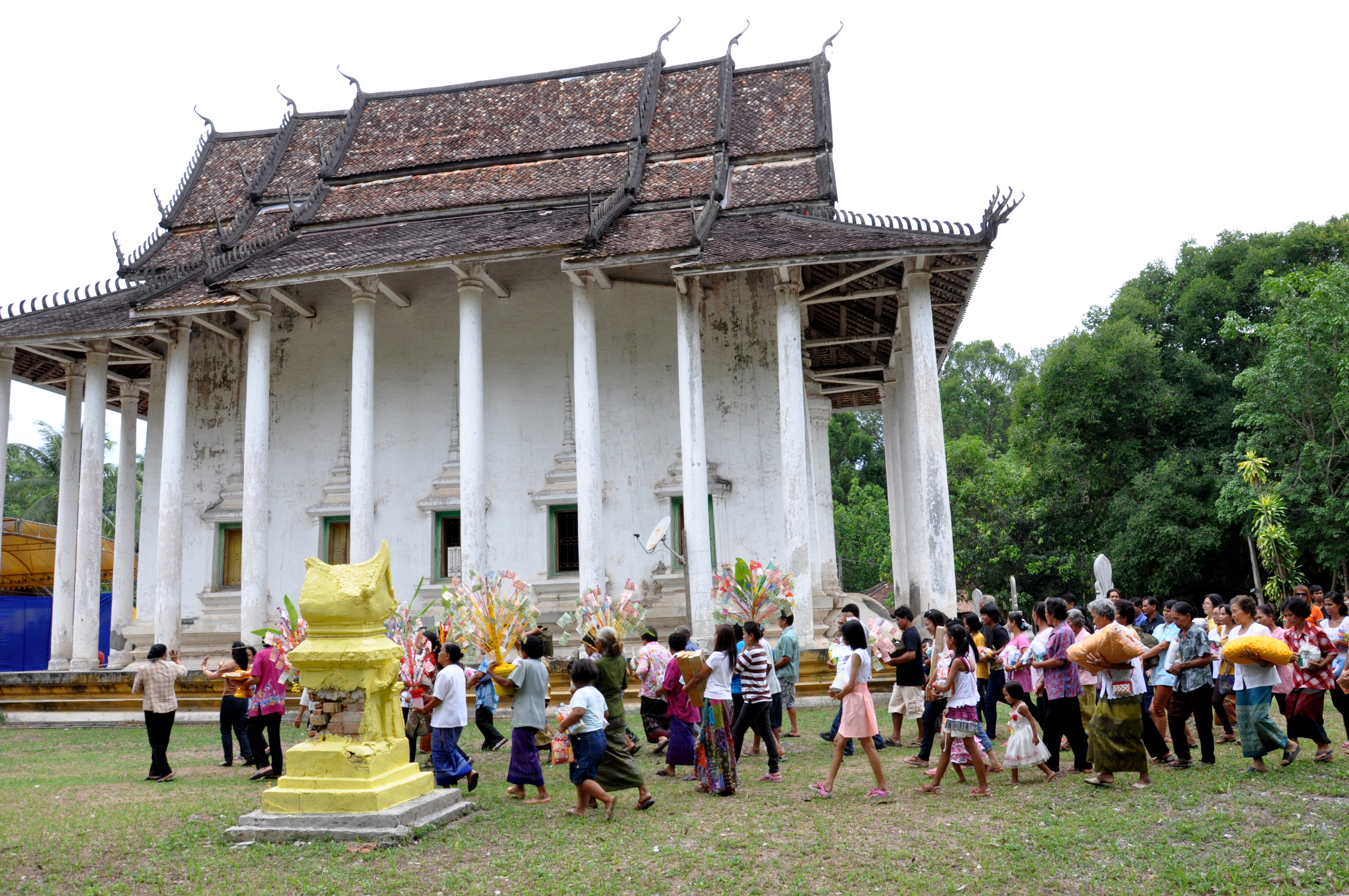
- Wat Thep Nimit

- District location in Pattani province
- Coordinates: 6°51′36″N 101°29′29″E
- Country: Thailand
- Province: Pattani

Area
  - Total: 144.1 km^{2} (55.6 sq mi)

Population (2008)
  - Total: 43,131
  - Density: 299/km^{2} (770/sq mi)
- Time zone: UTC+7 (ICT)
- Postal code: 94130
- Geocode: 9404

Panare (Thai: ปะนาเระ, pronounced [pā.nāː.réʔ]) is a district (amphoe) in Pattani province, southern Thailand.

== History ==
The name "Panare" comes from the Pattani Malay language: Pata means pantai in Standard Malay meaning 'beach' and tare means 'otter trawl'. Thus Pata Tare means 'a beach for drying otter trawls in the air'. With time the pronunciation changed to Panare.

== Geography ==
Neighboring districts are (from the south clockwise) Sai Buri, Mayo, and Yaring. To the north and east is the Gulf of Thailand.

== Administration ==
The district is divided into 10 sub-districts (tambons), which are further subdivided into 52 villages (mubans). Panare is a sub-district municipality (thesaban tambon) which covers most of tambon Panare. There are a further 10 tambon administrative organizations (TAO).

No.	Name	Thai	Villages	Pop.
1.	Panare	ปะนาเระ	5	9,290
2.	Tha Kham	ท่าข้าม	4	2,093
3.	Ban Nok	บ้านนอก	6	4,079
4.	Don	ดอน	6	3,601
5.	Khuan	ควน	5	2,437
6.	Tha Nam	ท่าน้ำ	5	4,249
7.	Khok Krabue	คอกกระบือ	4	1,866
8.	Pho Ming	พ่อมิ่ง	4	2,844
9.	Ban Klang	บ้านกลาง	9	7,146
10.	Ban Nam Bo	บ้านน้ำบ่อ	4	5,526

== Economy ==
Ban Klang Subdistrict is home to the Chao Lay School (Sea Gypsy School of Fishery), an institution that teaches sustainable fishing and has spurred the rejuvenation of Pattani's fisheries industry, horse crabs in particular.

== Gallery ==
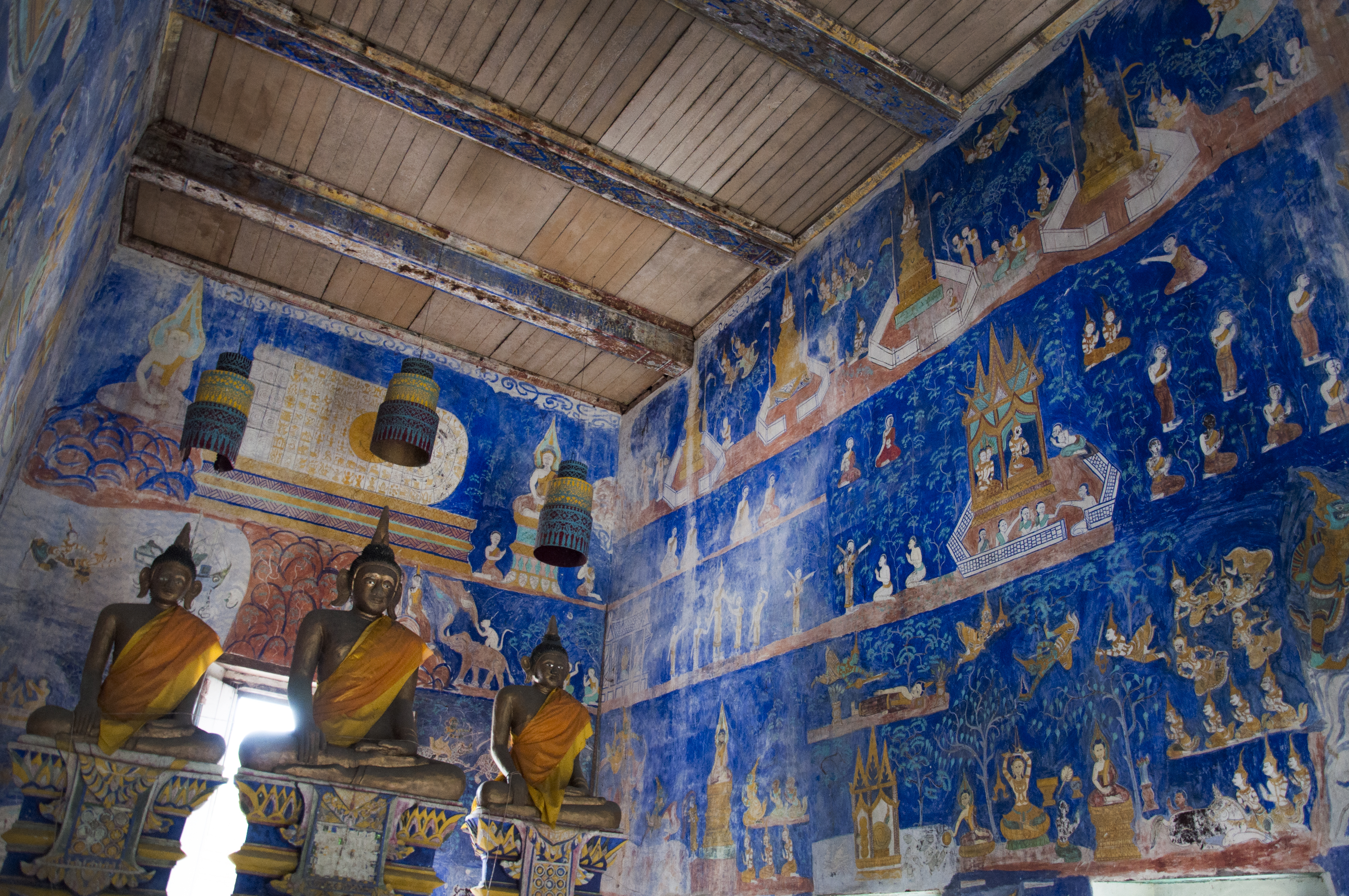
Paintings at Wat Thep Nimit, Ban Klang

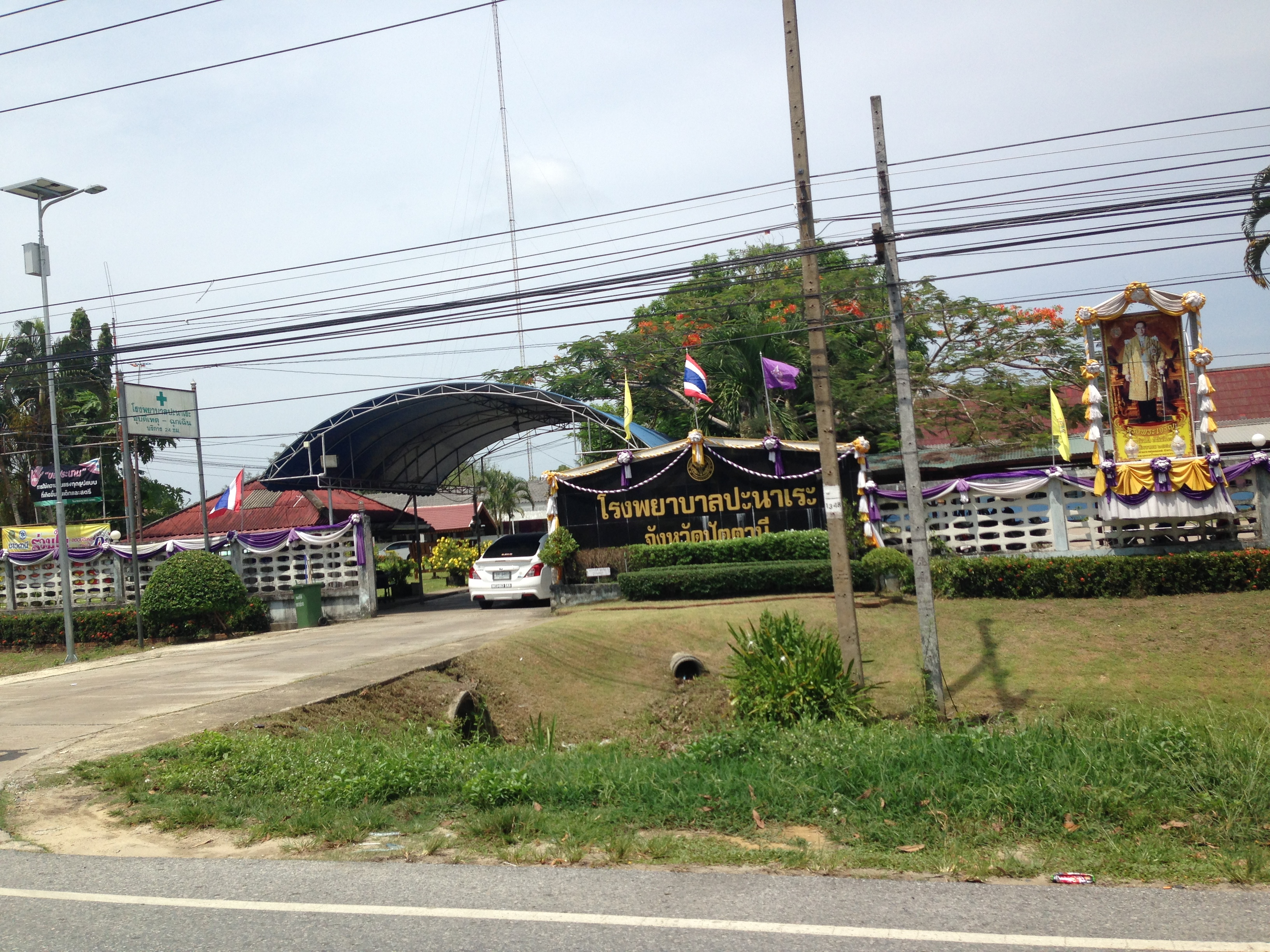
Panare hospital, Tha Kham

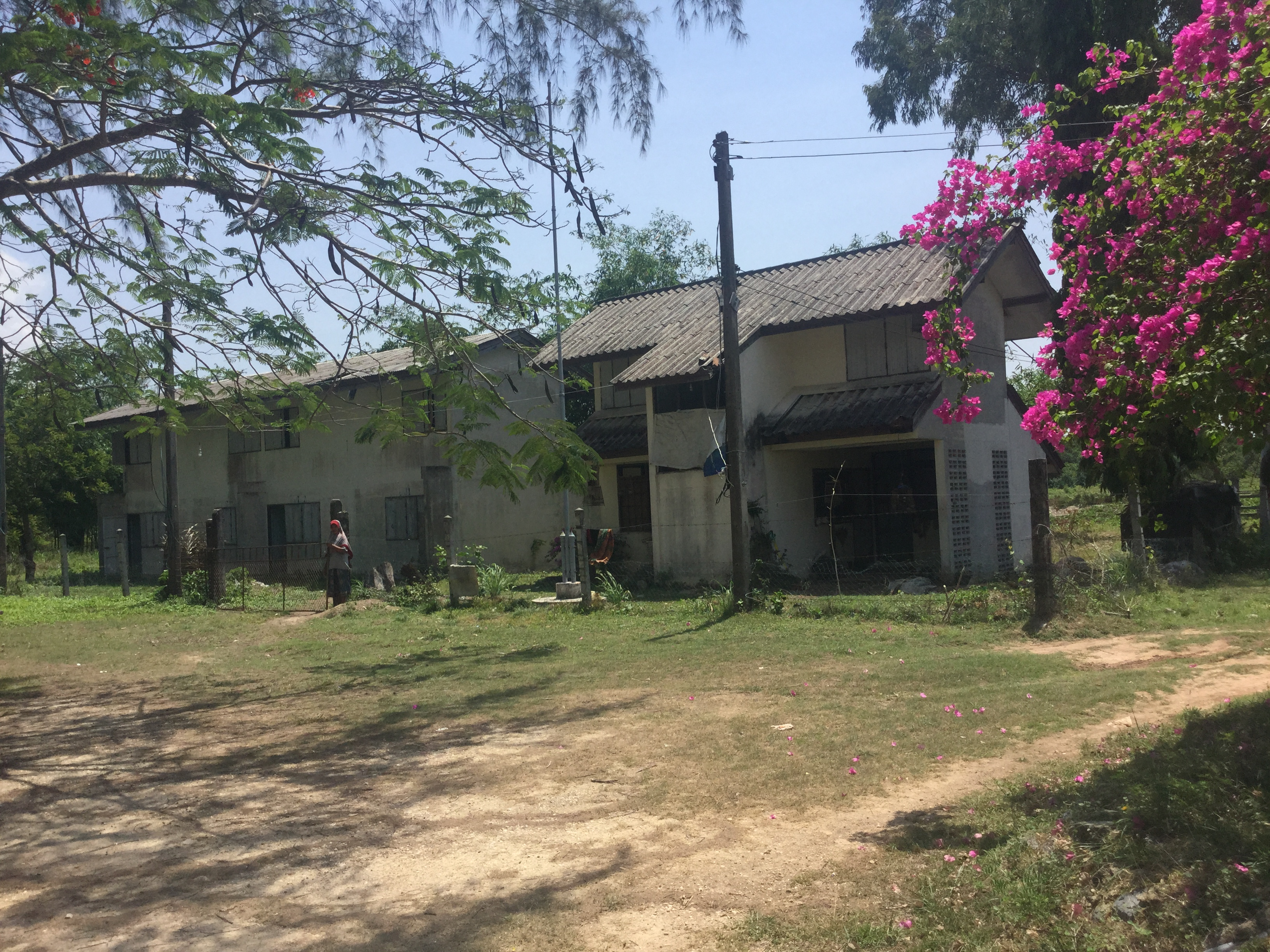
Ban Klang

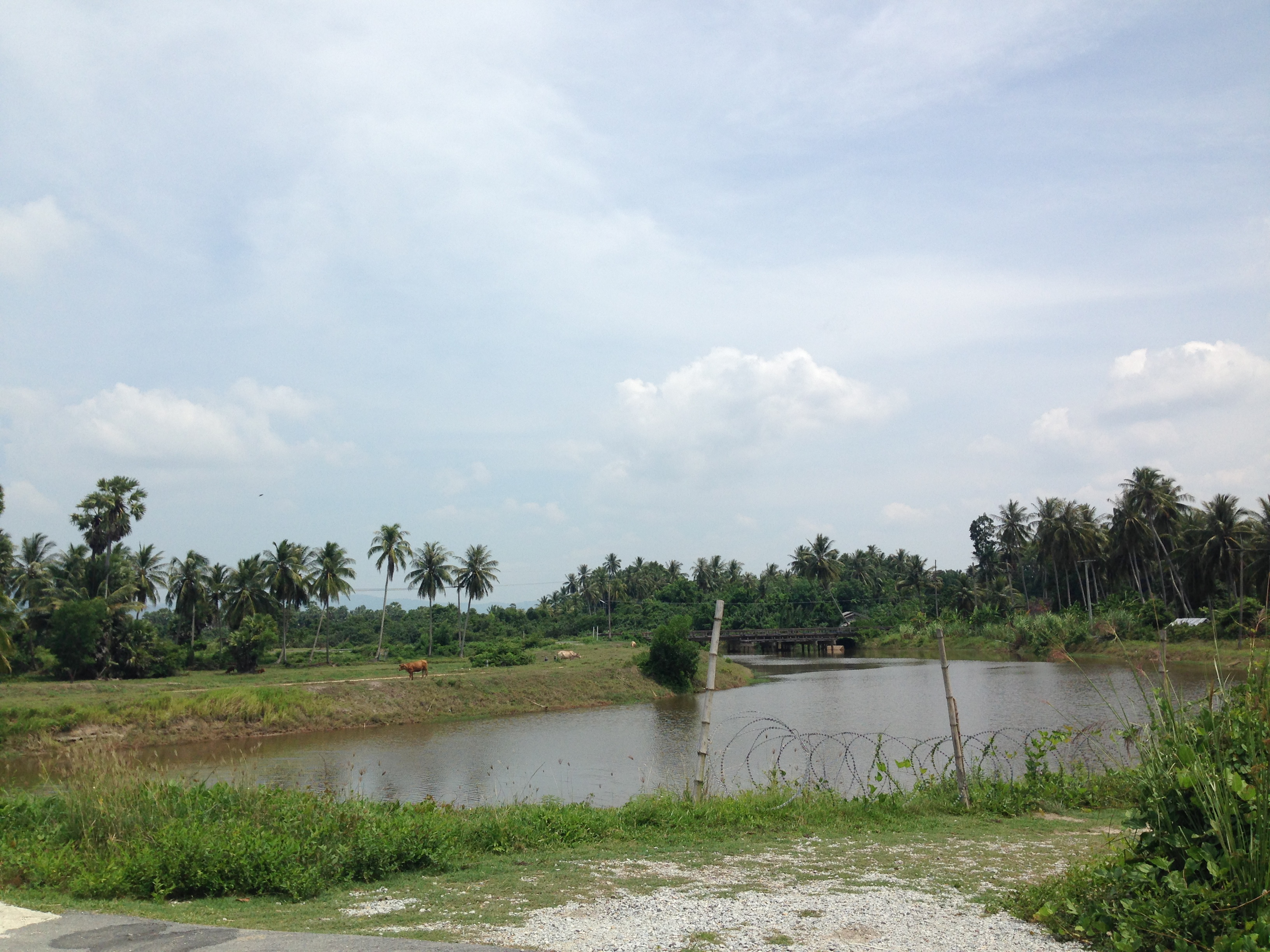
Countryside, Ban Klang

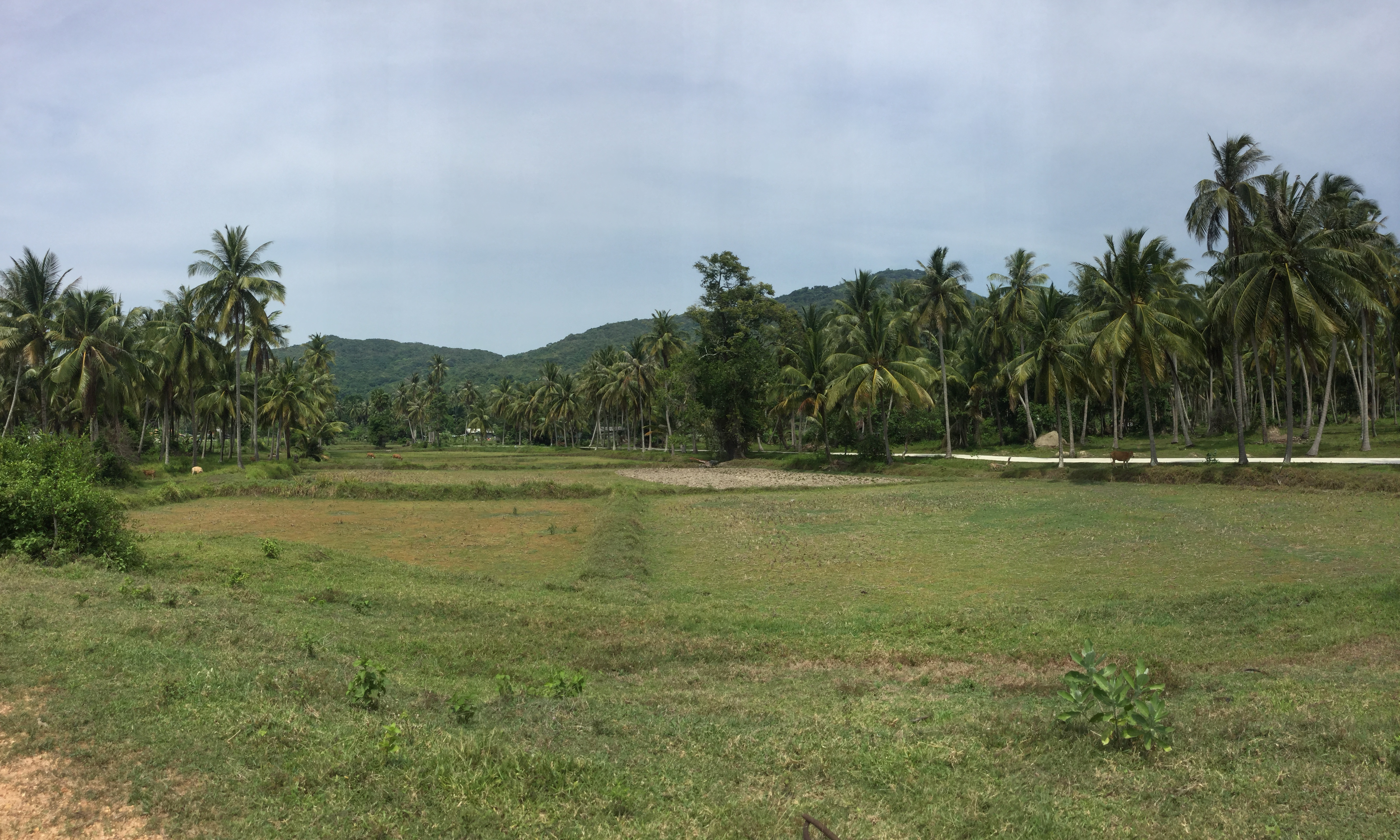
Paddy fields and a coconut plantation
