= Mayo district, Pattani =

Mayo มายอ
- District
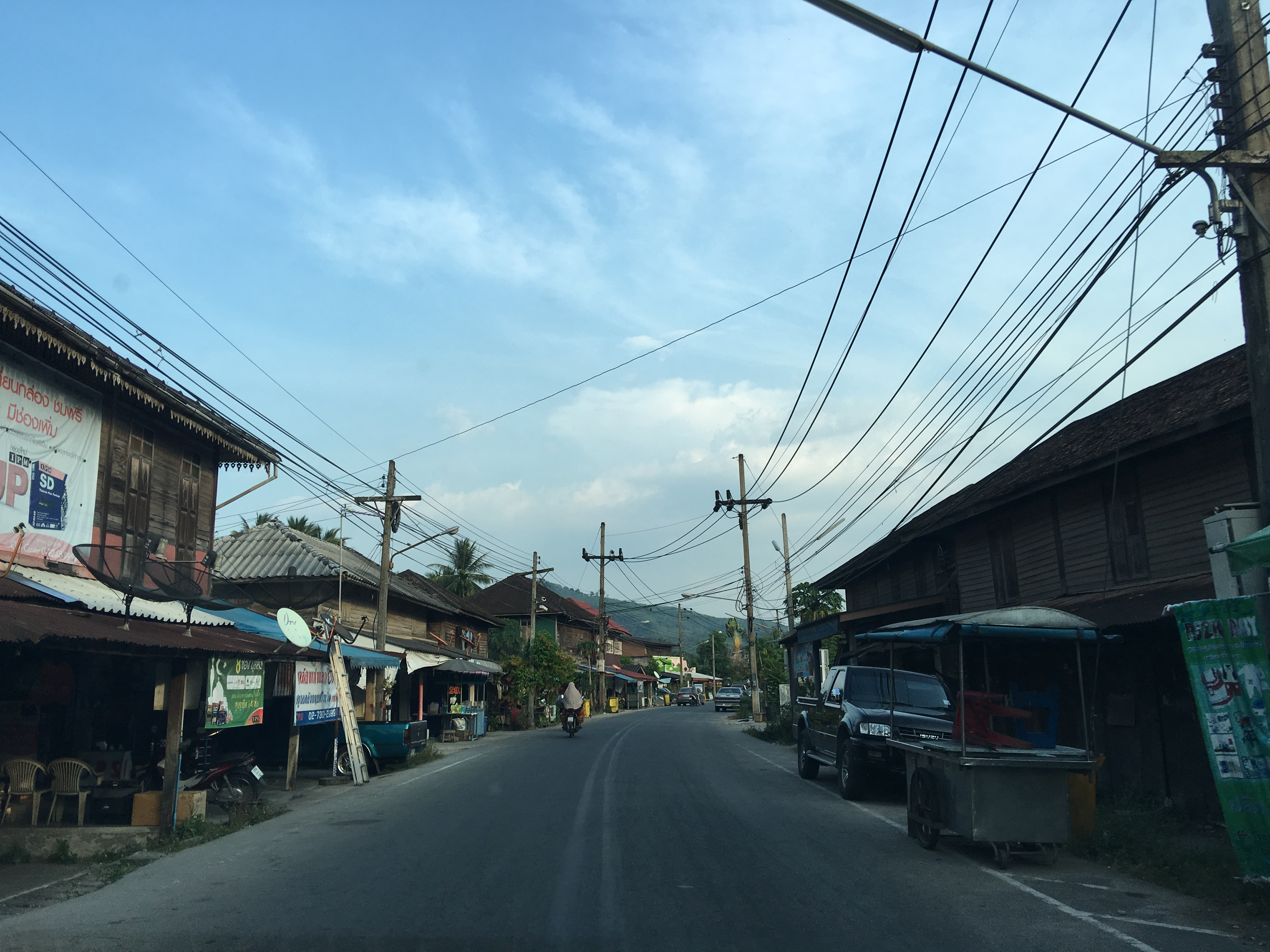
- Mayo, 2016

- District location in Pattani province
- Coordinates: 6°43′7″N 101°24′36″E
- Country: Thailand
- Province: Pattani

Area
  - Total: 216.1 km^{2} (83.4 sq mi)

Population (2005)
  - Total: 53,070
  - Density: 245.6/km^{2} (636/sq mi)
- Time zone: UTC+7 (ICT)
- Postal code: 94140
- Geocode: 9405

Mayo (Thai: มายอ, pronounced [māː.jɔ̄ː]) is a district (amphoe) of Pattani province, southern Thailand.

== History ==
The area of Mayo was originally part of Yaring district. In 1900 the district was established, then named Rako (ราเกาะ). When in the following year the district office in tambon Mayo was opened the district was renamed after its central tambon.

== Geography ==
Neighboring districts are (from the north clockwise) Yaring, Panare, Thung Yang Daeng, and Yarang.

== Administration ==
The district is divided into 13 sub-districts (tambons), which are further subdivided into 58 villages (mubans). Mayo is a township (thesaban tambon) which covers most parts of tambon Mayo. There are a further 10 tambon administrative organizations (TAO).

No.	Name	Thai name	Villages	Pop.
1.	Mayo	มายอ	3	4,468
2.	Thanon	ถนน	4	3,495
3.	Trang	ตรัง	4	3,014
4.	Krawa	กระหวะ	5	3,220
5.	Lubo Yirai	ลุโบะยิไร	8	9,880
6.	La-nga	ลางา	7	6,146
7.	Kraso	กระเสาะ	5	3,490
8.	Ko Chan	เกาะจัน	5	4,562
9.	Pado	ปะโด	4	4,506
10.	Sakho Bon	สาคอบน	3	2,896
11.	Sakho Tai	สาคอใต้	4	1,885
12.	Sakam	สะกำ	4	3,880
13.	Panan	ปานัน	2	1,628
