= Kapho district =

Kapho กะพ้อ
- District
- District location in Pattani province
- Coordinates: 6°33′33″N 101°32′3″E
- Country: Thailand
- Province: Pattani
- Seat: Karubi

Area
  - Total: 93.814 km^{2} (36.222 sq mi)

Population (2005)
  - Total: 15,782
  - Density: 168.2/km^{2} (436/sq mi)
- Time zone: UTC+7 (ICT)
- Postal code: 94230
- Geocode: 9411

Kapho (Thai: กะพ้อ, pronounced [kā.pʰɔ́ː]) is a district (amphoe) in Pattani province, southern Thailand.

== History ==
The minor district (king amphoe) Kapho was formed on 15 March 1982 by splitting off three southern tambons from Sai Buri district. On 4 November 1993 it was upgraded to a full district.

== Geography ==
Neighboring districts are (from the northwest clockwise): Thung Yang Daeng and Sai Buri of Pattani Province; Bacho of Narathiwat province; and Raman of Yala province.

== Administration ==
The district is divided into three sub-districts (tambons), which are further subdivided into 22 villages (mubans). There are no municipal (thesaban) areas. There are three tambon administrative organizations (TAO).

No.	Name	Thai name	Villages	Pop.
1.	Karubi	กะรุบี	9	5,048
2.	Talo Dueraman	ตะโละดือรามัน	6	4,300
3.	Plong Hoi	ปล่องหอย	7	6,434
