= 2007 South Thailand bombings =

Terrorist incident in Thailand

- Part of the South Thailand insurgency
- Location: Thailand: Narathiwat Province; Pattani Province; Songkhla Province; Yala Province
- Date: 18–19 February 2007
- Attack type: Bombing
- Deaths: 7

The 2007 South Thailand bombings were a series of bombings that hit Narathiwat, Pattani, Songkhla and Yala during the Chinese New Year celebrations on 18 and 19 February. At least seven people were killed. The bombings were the first time the rebels had simultaneously struck all four southern provinces. The attacks on Sunday and early Monday targeted mostly residential and business establishments owned by Buddhists or ethnic Chinese.

== Attacks ==
The synchronised bombings targeted hotels, karaoke bars, power grids and commercial sites. Two public schools were torched. Then head of the Thai government, junta chief Sonthi Boonyaratglin and his Interior Minister Aree Wongsearaya admitted that they knew in advance that attacks were going to take place, then failed to prevent them taking place.

In nearby Narathiwat Province, at least one person was killed and 10 were wounded in blasts at five karaoke bars in the border town of Sungai Golok. Local schools and mosques in Narathiwat were also burnt.

Over 10 bombs exploded in Yala province injuring at least 23 people in and around Yala's provincial capital, according to a witness at the main hospital. Local officials ordered Yala residents to stay home to avoid more bomb attacks during night.

In Pattani Province, police radio said Pattani's provincial capital fell dark after a bomb knocked out a power station.

== Suspects ==
It is assumed that the south Thailand insurgency carried out the attacks. No group took responsibility for the bombings.

== See also ==
- South Thailand insurgency
