= Mae Lan district =

Mae Lan แม่ลาน
- District
- District location in Pattani province
- Coordinates: 6°39′39″N 101°14′23″E
- Country: Thailand
- Province: Pattani
- Seat: Mae Lan

Area
  - Total: 89.2 km^{2} (34.4 sq mi)

Population (2005)
  - Total: 14,863
  - Density: 166.6/km^{2} (431/sq mi)
- Time zone: UTC+7 (ICT)
- Postal code: 94180
- Geocode: 9412

Mae Lan (Thai: แม่ลาน, pronounced [mɛ̂ː lāːn]) is a district (amphoe) of Pattani province, southern Thailand.

== History ==
The minor district (king amphoe) Mae Lan was formed on 1 April 1989 by splitting off three tambons from Khok Pho district. On 7 September 1995, it was upgraded to a full district.

As of 2018, the provisions of Thailand's Internal Security Act remain imposed on Mae Lan District. Internal security restrictions, maintained by Thailand's Internal Security Operations Command (ISOC) can result in curfews, prohibited entry, or prohibited transport of goods. It is considered one step below the imposition of full martial law.

== Geography ==
Neighboring districts are (from the west clockwise): Khok Pho, Nong Chik, and Yarang of Pattani Province; and Mueang Yala of Yala province.

== Administration ==
The district is divided into three sub-districts (tambons), which are further subdivided into 22 villages (mubans). There are no municipal (thesaban) areas. There are three tambon administrative organizations (TAO).

No.	Name	Thai name	Villages	Pop.
1.	Mae Lan	แม่ลาน	8	3,682
2.	Muang Tia	ม่วงเตี้ย	9	5,436
3.	Parai	ป่าไร่	10	5,745
