= Thung Yang Daeng district =

Thung Yang Daeng ทุ่งยางแดง
- District
- District location in Pattani province
- Coordinates: 6°37′3″N 101°25′33″E
- Country: Thailand
- Province: Pattani
- Seat: Talo Maena

Area
  - Total: 114.97 km^{2} (44.39 sq mi)

Population (2005)
  - Total: 20,203
  - Density: 175.7/km^{2} (455/sq mi)
- Time zone: UTC+7 (ICT)
- Postal code: 94140
- Geocode: 9406

Thung Yang Daeng (Thai: ทุ่งยางแดง, pronounced [tʰûŋ jāːŋ dɛ̄ːŋ]) is a district (amphoe) of Pattani province, southern Thailand.

== History ==
The minor district (king amphoe) Thung Yang Daeng was created on 16 May 1977, when four tambons were split off from Mayo district. On 4 July 1994 it was upgraded to a full district.

== Geography ==
Neighboring districts are (from the south clockwise): Raman of Yala province; Yarang, Mayo, Sai Buri, and Kapho of Pattani Province.

== Administration ==
The district is divided into four sub-districts (tambons), which are further subdivided into 22 villages (mubans). There are no municipal (thesabans). There are four tambon administrative organizations (TAO).

No.	Name	Thai name	Villages	Pop.
1.	Talo Maena	ตะโละแมะนา	4	2,983
2.	Phithen	พิเทน	7	7,481
3.	Nam Dam	น้ำดำ	4	3,122
4.	Paku	ปากู	7	6,617
