= Yaring district =

Yaring ยะหริ่ง
- District
- District location in Pattani province
- Coordinates: 6°51′59″N 101°22′9″E
- Country: Thailand
- Province: Pattani

Area
  - Total: 196.8 km^{2} (76.0 sq mi)

Population (2005)
  - Total: 77,941
  - Density: 396/km^{2} (1,030/sq mi)
- Time zone: UTC+7 (ICT)
- Postal code: 94150
- Geocode: 9409

Yaring (Thai: ยะหริ่ง, pronounced [já(ʔ).rìŋ]) is a district (amphoe) of Pattani province, southern Thailand. The Thai name is a corruption of the Malay Jaring (Jawi: جاريڠ).

== Geography ==
Neighboring districts are (from the east clockwise): Panare, Mayo, Yarang, and Mueang Pattani. To the north is the Gulf of Thailand.

== Administration ==
The district is divided into 18 sub-districts (tambons), which are further subdivided into 81 villages (mubans). There are three townships (thesaban tambons) in the district. Bang Pu covers tambon Bang Pu, Yaring parts of tambon Ya Mu, and Than Yong part of tambon Manang Yong. There are a further 13 tambon administrative organizations (TAO).

No.	Name	Thai name	Villages	Pop.
1.	Talo	ตะโละ	5	2,928
2.	Talo Kapo	ตะโละกาโปร์	5	7,470
3.	Tanyong Dalo	ตันหยงดาลอ	5	3,144
4.	Tanyong Chueng-nga	ตันหยงจึงงา	2	1,685
5.	Tolang	ตอหลัง	3	2,656
6.	Takae	ตาแกะ	4	3,874
7.	Tali-ai	ตาลีอายร์	4	3,735
8.	Yamu	ยามู	5	8,434
9.	Bang Pu	บางปู	3	9,269
10.	Nong Raet	หนองแรต	6	3,158
11.	Piya Mumang	ปิยามุมัง	5	3,290
12.	Pulakong	ปุลากง	4	1,834
13.	Baloi	บาโลย	4	2,420
14.	Saban	สาบัน	5	2,532
15.	Manang Yong	มะนังยง	5	5,187
16.	Rata Panyang	ราตาปันยัง	5	3,965
17.	Charang	จะรัง	7	4,366
18.	Laem Pho	แหลมโพธิ์	4	7,994
