= Yarang district =

Yarang ยะรัง (Thai) Bin Yalimo (Malay) بن ياليمو (Jawi)
- District
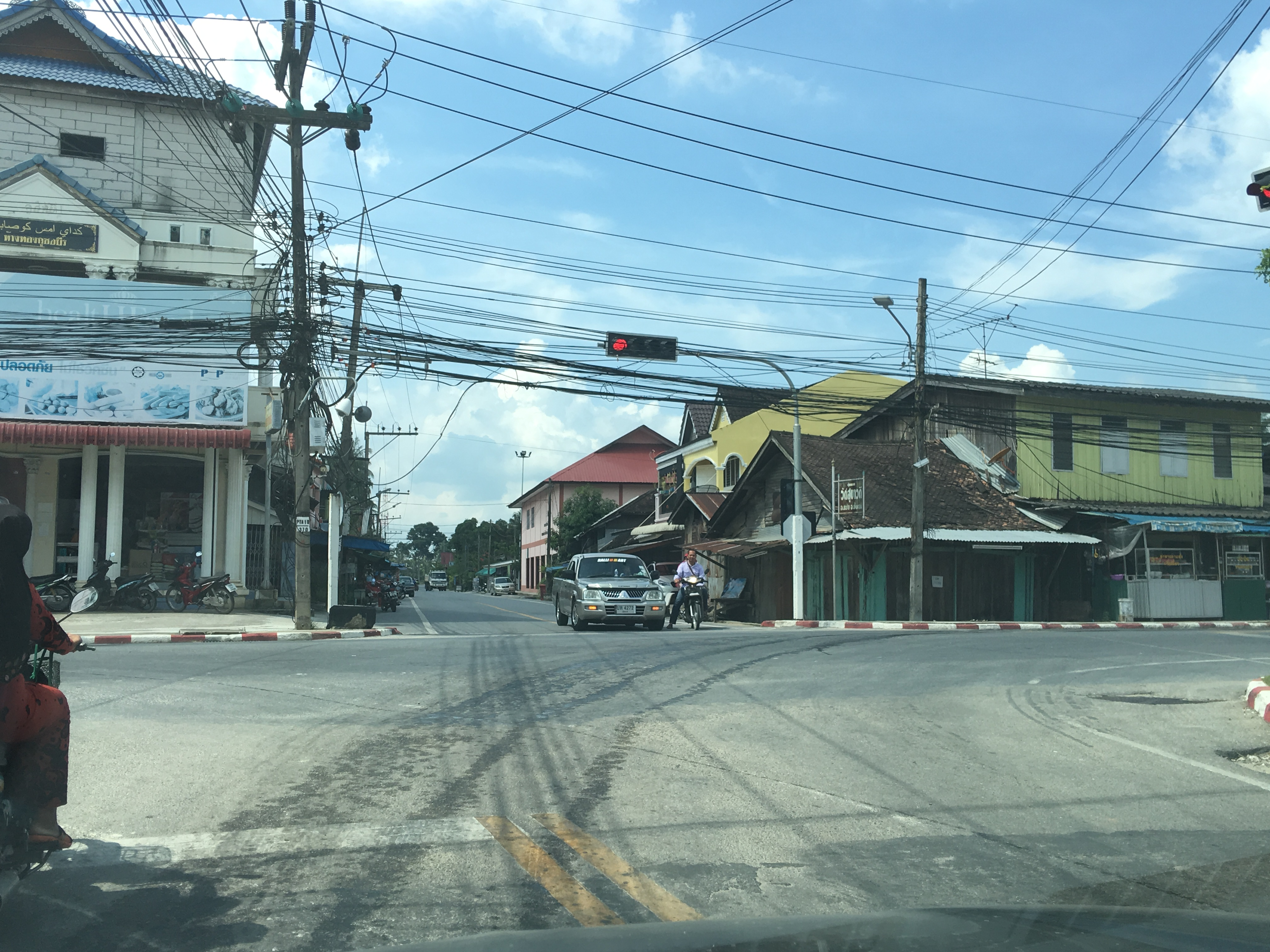
- Yarang intersection before 2020 expansion

- District location in Pattani Province
- Coordinates: 6°45′37″N 101°17′36″E
- Country: Thailand
- Province: Pattani

Area
  - Total: 184.0 km^{2} (71.0 sq mi)

Population (2020)
  - Total: 94,777
  - Density: 515.1/km^{2} (1,334/sq mi)
- Time zone: UTC+7 (ICT)
- Postal code: 94160
- Geocode: 9410

Yarang (Thai: ยะรัง, pronounced [já(ʔ).rāŋ]) is a district (amphoe) of Pattani province, southern Thailand.

== History ==
Yarang is one of the largest early historical communities in southern Thailand. It is believed to be the location of an ancient kingdom named "Langkasuka" or "Langya Siao" as evidence appears in Chinese, Javanese, Malay and Arabic documents. The characteristics of the ancient city of Yarang are assumed to have a large oval city plan in an area of approximately 9 square kilometers. Results from archaeological studies. Evidence from the same period was found at the ancient city of Yarang, Yarang District, Pattani Province. Archaeological sites in the area of Ban Thasap - Khao Kampan, Mueang Yala District, Yala Province and the ancient city of Bujang Valley (Bujang Valley) in Kedah State, Malaysia cause an assumption that there may be a route across the peninsula by land (transpeninsular route) that was used to communicate between cities on the western sea coast (Indian Ocean) and the eastern sea coast (South China Sea) since at least approximately 1,000 years ago. The ancient city of Ban Jalae was a prosperous city in the year B.E. 700-1400 AD, which had a north direction. The contacts Songkhla and Phatthalung in the south, extending to the Malay Peninsula. west and east along the coast, there are ancient remains and antiquities from the Srivijaya and Dvaravati periods. The ancient city of Yarang is a community with great historical and archaeological importance. It may be related to the Langkasuka kingdom, which is a kingdom on the Malay Peninsula. There is evidence in Chinese, Arabic, Javanese, and Malay documents from around the 13th century, and it is assumed that it would be centered in the area of present-day Pattani Province and may have influence extending to the Malaysian state as well. Moreover, it must be an important port city located near the sea. and is a stable land. It has played a political and economic role, always being involved with nearby territories and having extensive trade contacts with foreigners since the 12th century. The word "Yarang" (ยะรัง) is assumed to be a derivative of the word "Brawae" (บราแว) in the Kelantan-Pattani Malay which corresponds to the Thai word "Phawang" (พะวัง) or "Phraratwang" (พระราชวัง). The reason why this area is called "Brawae" or "Phraratwang" is because there is historical evidence that shows that This area used to be the location of an ancient city named "Kota Mahalikhai". Today there are still remains of earthen walls, a moat, a pond (ancient well) and the ruins of many ancient sites in the area. Village Moo 3, Ban Prawae, Yarang Subdistrict, from the word "Prawae" (ปราแว) which means "Phraratwang" or "Phrawang" (พระวัง) for hundreds of years later became "Yarang". When the district was named, this name was adopted as the name of the district.

On August 1, 1909, an pavilion was built at Ban Anobulo, Khaotum Subdistrict, Yarang District.

On February 10, 1930, Yarang District Office was moved to Ban Binyalimo due to flooding.

On June 10, 1947, 3 new subdistricts were established including:-

- Khlong Mai Subdistrict was established from separating areas in Krado Subdistrict and Pitumudi Subdistrict.
- Momawi Subdistrict was established from separating areas in Krado Subdistrict and Kolam Subdistrict.
- Wat Subdistrict was established from separating areas in Rawaeng Subdistrict.

On November 28, 1956, the Yarang Sanitary Center (Sukhaphiban Yarang) was established in some areas of Yarang Subdistrict and Pitumudi Subdistrict.

On May 25, 1999, the city status was elevated from Yarang Sanitary Center (Sukhaphiban Yarang) into Yarang Subdistrict Municipality (Thesaban Tambon Yarang) as a result of the law.

== Geography ==
Neighboring districts are (from the south clockwise) Raman and Mueang Yala of Yala province, Mae Lan, Nong Chik, Mueang Pattani, Yaring, Mayo, and Thung Yang Daeng of Pattani Province.

== Economy ==
Tambon Khaotum in the district is the site of Fort Sirindhorn, home of the Internal Security Operations Command Area 4.

== Administration ==
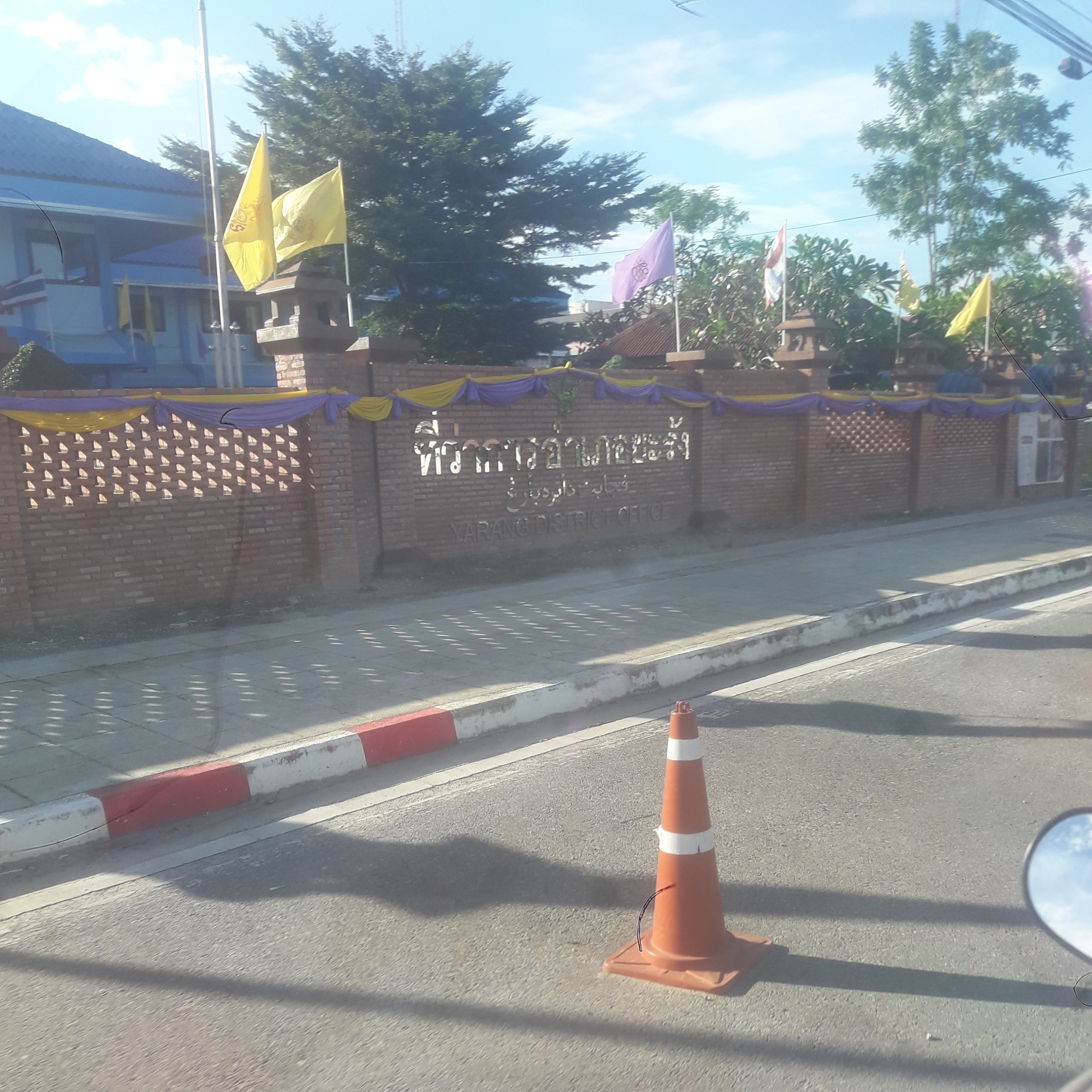
Yarang District Office, 2024

The district is divided into 12 sub-districts (tambons), which are further subdivided into 72 villages (mubans). Yarang is a township (thesaban tambon) which parts of the tambon Yarang and Pitumudi. There are a further 12 tambon administrative organizations (TAO).

| No. | Name | Thai name | Villages | Pop. |
|---|---|---|---|---|
| 1. | Yarang | ยะรัง | 6 | 9,986 |
| 2. | Sadawa | สะดาวา | 8 | 7,326 |
| 3. | Prachan | ประจัน | 9 | 7,396 |
| 4. | Sano | สะนอ | 4 | 5,023 |
| 5. | Rawaeng | ระแว้ง | 6 | 4,247 |
| 6. | Pitumudi | ปิตูมุดี | 5 | 5,633 |
| 7. | Wat | วัด | 5 | 4,821 |
| 8. | Krado | กระโด | 5 | 4,536 |
| 9. | Khlong Mai | คลองใหม่ | 6 | 4,955 |
| 10 | Momawi | เมาะมาวี | 6 | 10,137 |
| 11. | Kolam | กอลำ | 5 | 5,900 |
| 12. | Khaotum | เขาตูม | 7 | 13,810 |
