= Pattani province =

Coordinates: 6°52′4″N 101°15′00″E

Pattani ปัตตานี
- Province

Other transcription(s)
  - Jawi: ڤطاني (Jawi)
  - Malay: Patani (Rumi)
  - Chinese: 北大年 (Simplified)
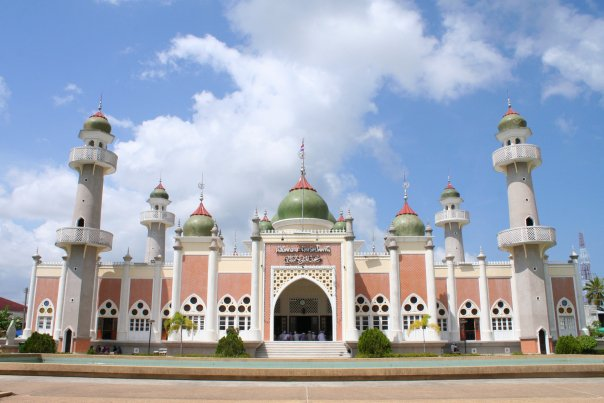
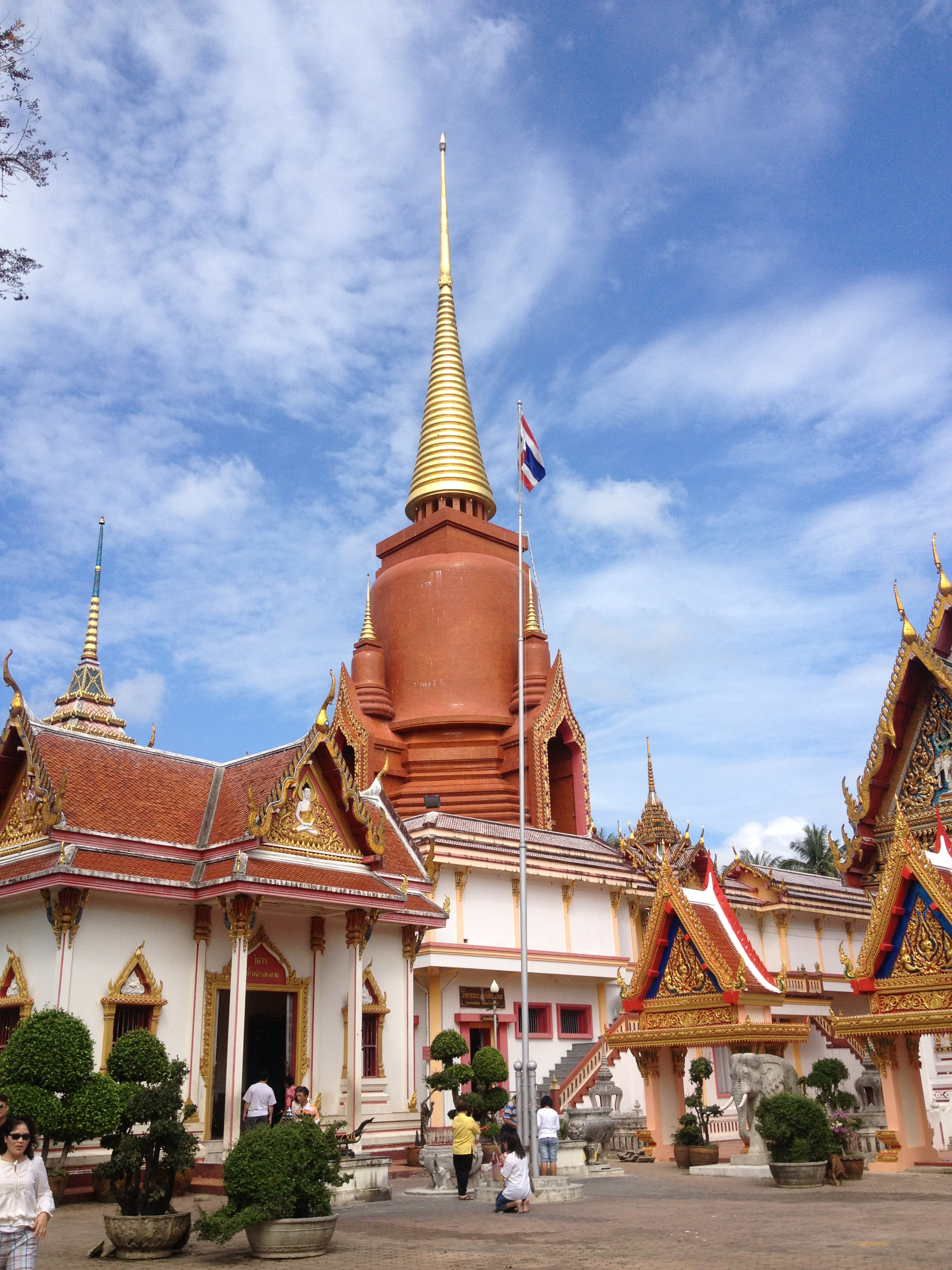
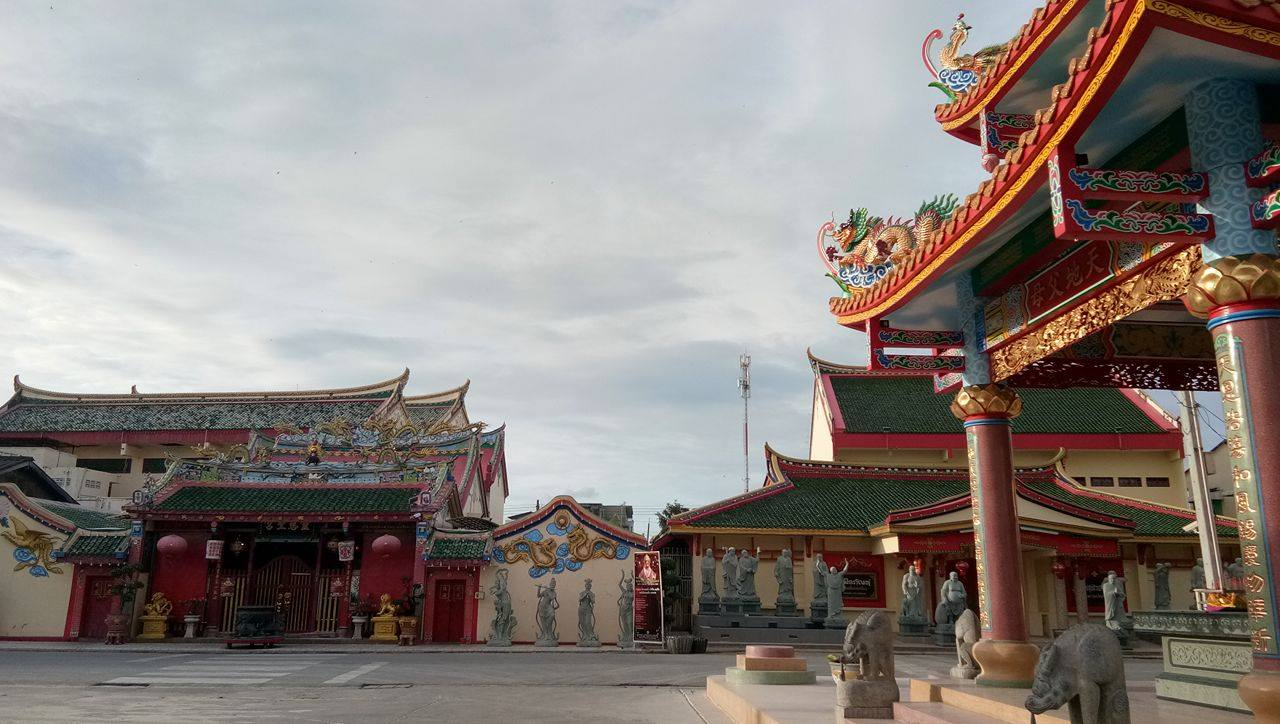
- From left top: Pattani Grand Mosque, Wat Chang Hai, Leng Chu Kiang Shrine

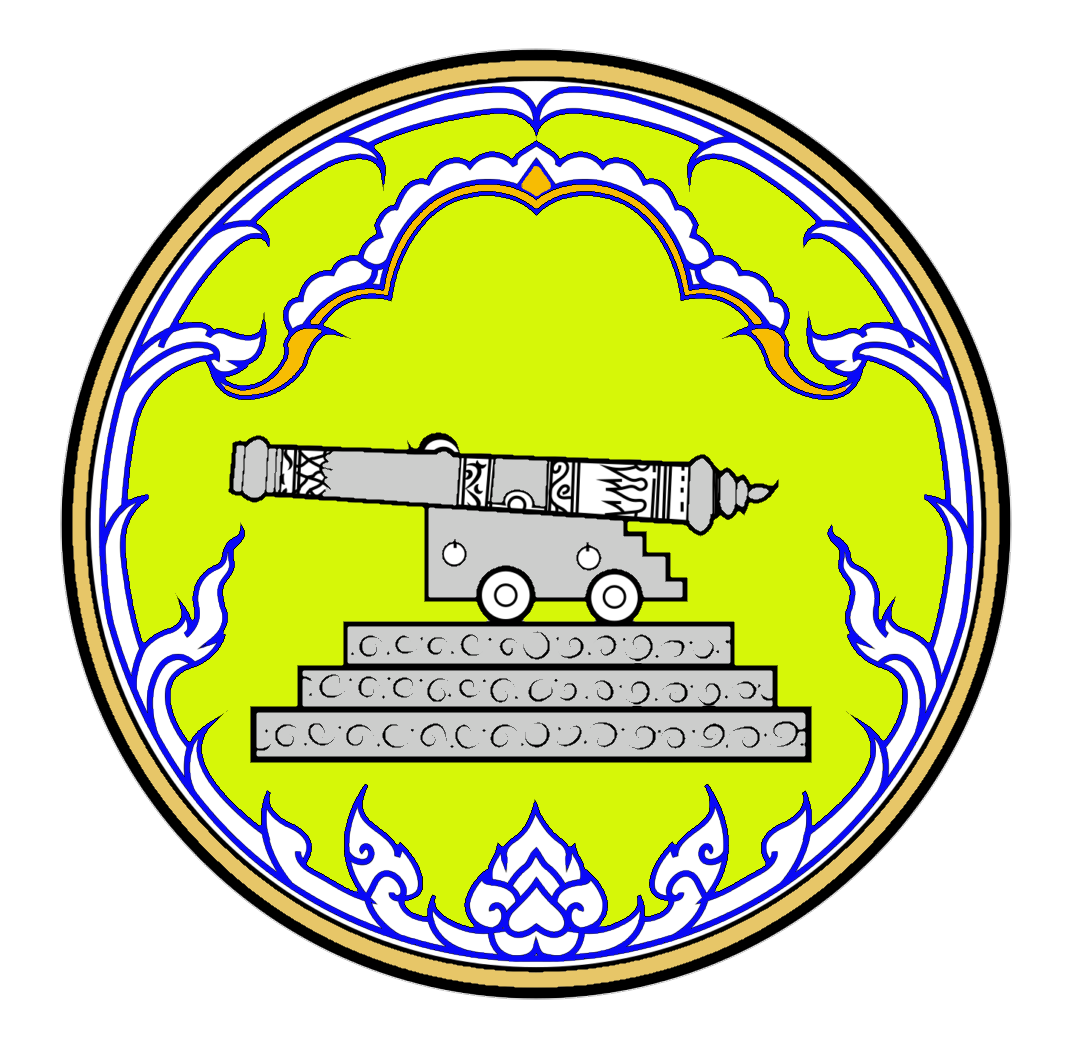
- Flag Seal
- Mottoes: เมืองงามสามวัฒนธรรม ศูนย์ฮาลาลเลิศล้ำ ชนน้อมนำศรัทธา ถิ่นธรรมชาติงามตา ปัตตานีสันติสุขแดนใต้ ("Beautiful tricultural city. Excellent Halal center. People of faith. Place of beautiful nature. Pattani, the peaceful land of the South.")
- Map of Thailand highlighting Pattani province
- Country: Thailand
- Capital: Pattani

Government
  - Type: Province and Provincial Administrative Organization
  - Body: Pattani Province and Pattani Provincial Administrative Organization
  - Governor: Pateemoh Sadeeyamu
  - PAO Chief Executive: Seth Alyufri

Area
  - Total: 1,977 km^{2} (763 sq mi)
  - Rank: 68th

Population (2024)
  - Total: ▼740,904
  - Rank: 33rd
  - Density: 375/km^{2} (970/sq mi)
  - Rank: 9th

Human Achievement Index
  - HAI (2022): 0.6149 "low" Ranked 70th

GDP
  - Total: baht 56 billion (US$1.6 billion) (2019)
- Time zone: UTC+7 (ICT)
- Postal code: 94xxx
- Calling code: 073
- ISO 3166 code: TH-94
- Website: pattani.go.th pattanipao.go.th

Pattani (Thai: ปัตตานี, pronounced [pàt.tāː.nīː]; Pattani Malay: ڤطاني, 'ตานิง, Taning, pronounced [ˈtːaniŋ]; Malay: Patani) is one of the southern provinces of Thailand. Neighboring provinces are (from southeast clockwise) Narathiwat, Yala, and Songkhla. Its capital is the town of Pattani.

== Toponymy ==
The name Pattani is the Thai adaptation of the Malay name Patani (Jawi: ڤطاني), which can mean "this beach" in Patani Malay language. (In standard Malay, this would be pantai ini.) According to legend, the founder of Patani went hunting and saw an albino mouse-deer the size of a goat, which then disappeared. He enquired where the animal had gone, and his men replied: "Pata ni lah!" ("this beach!") They searched for the mouse-deer but found instead an old man, who said his name was Che' Tani. The raja later ordered a town be built on the site where the mouse-deer had disappeared, and it is therefore believed that the town was named either after the beach or the old man. Another suggestion is that it derives from a Sanskrit word pathini, meaning "virgin nymph"; Pathini was the name of a daughter of Merong Mahawangsa, founder of the preceding Langkasuka Empire.

== History ==
The moated town of Yarang, south of the modern city, covers about 0.9 km² and lies 4.5 km from the Pattani River and 15 km from the gulf. Forty-four mounds identified as brick stupas have been recorded there, of which four have been excavated. A bronze Maitreya of the eighth or ninth century comes from Ban Lan Kwai.

Historically, Pattani province was the centre of the Patani Malay Sultanate of Patani Darul Makrif. For centuries a tributary state of Siam, Patani has been governed by Siam since its conquest in 1786. The provinces of Patani were turned into seven smaller provinces: Patani, Nong Chik, Raman, Ra-ngae, Saiburi, Yala and Yaring, later regrouped in 1906 into 4 larger provinces: Patani, Bangnara, Saiburi and Yala. Siamese rule was officially acknowledged by the Burney Treaty of 1826 negotiated with the British Empire which included also Kedah, Kelantan, Perlis and Terengganu. Unlike these four sultanates, Patani was not included in the Anglo-Siamese Treaty of 1909 and remained under Siamese rule. Both Yala (Jala) and Narathiwat (Menara) were originally part of Patani, but were made provinces in their own right during the territorial administrative reform and the creation of a united centralized Siam state in the early-20th century.

== Symbols ==
The seal of the province shows the cannon called Phraya Tani, known as Sri Pattani in Malay, which was cast in Pattani province. It was brought to Bangkok in 1785, and is now on display in front of the Ministry of Defence in Bangkok.

The provincial flower is the Chinese hibiscus (Hibiscus rosa-sinensis), and the provincial tree is the Ironwood (Hopea odorata). The provincial aquatic life is the snakeskin gourami (Trichopodus pectoralis).

== Geography ==
Pattani is on the Malay Peninsula, with the coast of the Gulf of Thailand to the north. The south is dominated by the Sankalakhiri mountain range, which includes Budo-Su-ngai Padi National Park, on the border with Yala and Narathiwat. The total forest area is 110 km^{2} (42 sq mi) or 5.6 percent of provincial area.

=== National parks ===
There are two national parks, along with three other national parks, make up region 6 (Pattani branch) of Thailand's protected areas. (Visitors in fiscal year 2024)

Budo–Su-ngai Padi National Park	341 km^{2} (132 sq mi)	(29,966)
Namtok Sai Khao National Park	70 km^{2} (27 sq mi)	(120,669)

== Transportation ==
=== Roads ===
Highway 42 is main highway in Pattani, which is tourist attractions are nearby and connecting several districts.
Highway 43 is secondary main highway that bypassing Mueang Pattani for saving times and fuels.
Also AH18 is part of Highway 42 and Highway 43.
Highway 410 is main highway in Yala Province, connecting to Mueang Yala and Betong.
Highway 409 and Highway 418 are secondary main highway on Yala Province.

=== Air ===
The Royal Thai Air Force's Pattani Airport is used for counter-insurgency operations in the area. It does not run public flights, Pattani's nearly public airport is Narathiwat Airport

=== Bus ===
Pattani's main bus stop is Pattani Bus Terminal, Including Pattani-Yala Transit.

=== Railway ===
Pattani's main railway stop is Khok Pho Railway Station.

== Demographics ==
Population by religion (2019)
Islam	87.57%
Buddhism	12.41%

Pattani is one of the four provinces of Thailand where the majority of the population are Muslim, the others being Yala, Narathiwat, and Satun. In the 2014 census, the Muslim population made up roughly 88 percent of the population. This is mainly due to the people of Malay ancestry, and large portion of Pattani Malay speakers (though most speak Thai as well).

== Administrative divisions ==
=== Provincial government ===

No.	Name	Thai	Jawi	Malay
1	Mueang Pattani	เมืองปัตตานี	فطاني	Patani/Fathoni
2	Khok Pho	โคกโพธิ์	خوكفور	Khuppur
3	Nong Chik	หนองจิก	نوڠ چيك	Nong Chik
4	Panare	ปะนาเระ	فناريق	Penarik
5	Mayo	มายอ	ماي، راكه	Maya, Rakoh
6	Thung Yang Daeng	ทุ่งยางแดง	کوءيڠ ميره	Kuing Merah
7	Sai Buri	สายบุรี	سليندوڠ بايو ، تلوبن	Selindung Bayu, Teluban
8	Mai Kaen	ไม้แก่น	مايكين	Maikaen
9	Yaring	ยะหริ่ง	جمبو	Jambu
10	Yarang	ยะรัง	جرام، بن ياليمو	Jeram, Bin Yalimo
11	Kapho	กะพ้อ	كأفور	Kapor
12	Mae Lan	แม่ลาน	ميلان	Melan

Pattani is divided into 12 districts (amphoe), which are further divided into 115 subdistricts (tambon) and 629 villages (muban). The districts of Chana (Malay: Chenok), Thepha (Malay:Tiba) and Saba Yoi (Malay:Sebayu) were detached from Pattani and transferred to Songkhla in 1796 by Siam government.

=== Local government ===
As of 26 November 2019 there are: one Pattani Provincial Administration Organisation (ongkan borihan suan changwat) and 17 municipal (thesaban) areas in the province. Pattani and Taluban have town (thesaban mueang) status. Further 15 subdistrict municipalities (thesaban tambon). The non-municipal areas are administered by 96 Subdistrict Administrative Organisations - SAO (ongkan borihan suan tambon).

== Economy ==
Six of Pattani's districts lie on the shore of the Gulf of Thailand. The number of fisheries workers in Pattani exceeds 80,000 as of 2019. Pattani is the only province in Thailand where the agriculture ministry prohibits trawlers and destructive fishing nets within four nautical miles of the shoreline. Local fish stocks have rebounded as a result.

Despite having many interesting places, Pattani is the least visited province in the country. According to data from Ministry of Tourism and Sports in 2018, the total number of tourists who visited the province was only 20,000–30,000, and consisted of mostly Thai people.

== Human achievement index 2022 ==
Health	Education	Employment	Income
15	77	33	76
Housing	Family	Transport	Participation
45	11	7	40
Province Pattani, with an HAI 2022 value of 0.6149 is "low", occupies place 70 in the ranking.

Since 2003, United Nations Development Programme (UNDP) in Thailand has tracked progress on human development at sub-national level using the Human achievement index (HAI), a composite index covering all the eight key areas of human development. National Economic and Social Development Board (NESDB) has taken over this task since 2017.

Rank	Classification
1 - 13	"high"
14 - 29	"somewhat high"
30 - 45	"average"
46 - 61	"somewhat low"
62 - 77	"low"

Map with provinces and HAI 2022 rankings

== Military rule ==
As of 2018, the provisions of Thailand's Internal Security Act remain imposed on Mae Lan District. Internal security restrictions, maintained by Thailand's Internal Security Operations Command can result in curfews, prohibited entry, or prohibited transport of goods. It is considered one step below the imposition of full martial law.

== Places of interest ==
Pattani has named as the land of three religions (Buddhism, Islam, Chinese religion). There are important places of worship for all three religions:

- Wat Rat Burana (Thai: วัดราษฎร์บูรณะ), also widely known as Wat Chang Hai (Thai: วัดช้างให้), an ancient Thai Buddhist temple older than 300 years, the legendary monk Luang Pu Thuat was once the abbot.
- Leng Chu Kiang Shrine (Thai: ศาลเจ้าเล่งจูเกียง) Chinese shrine of Lim Ko Niao (younger sister of Lin Daoqian).
- Krue Se Mosque (Thai: มัสยิดกรือเซะ) Regarded as one of the more famous mosques with the oldest history.

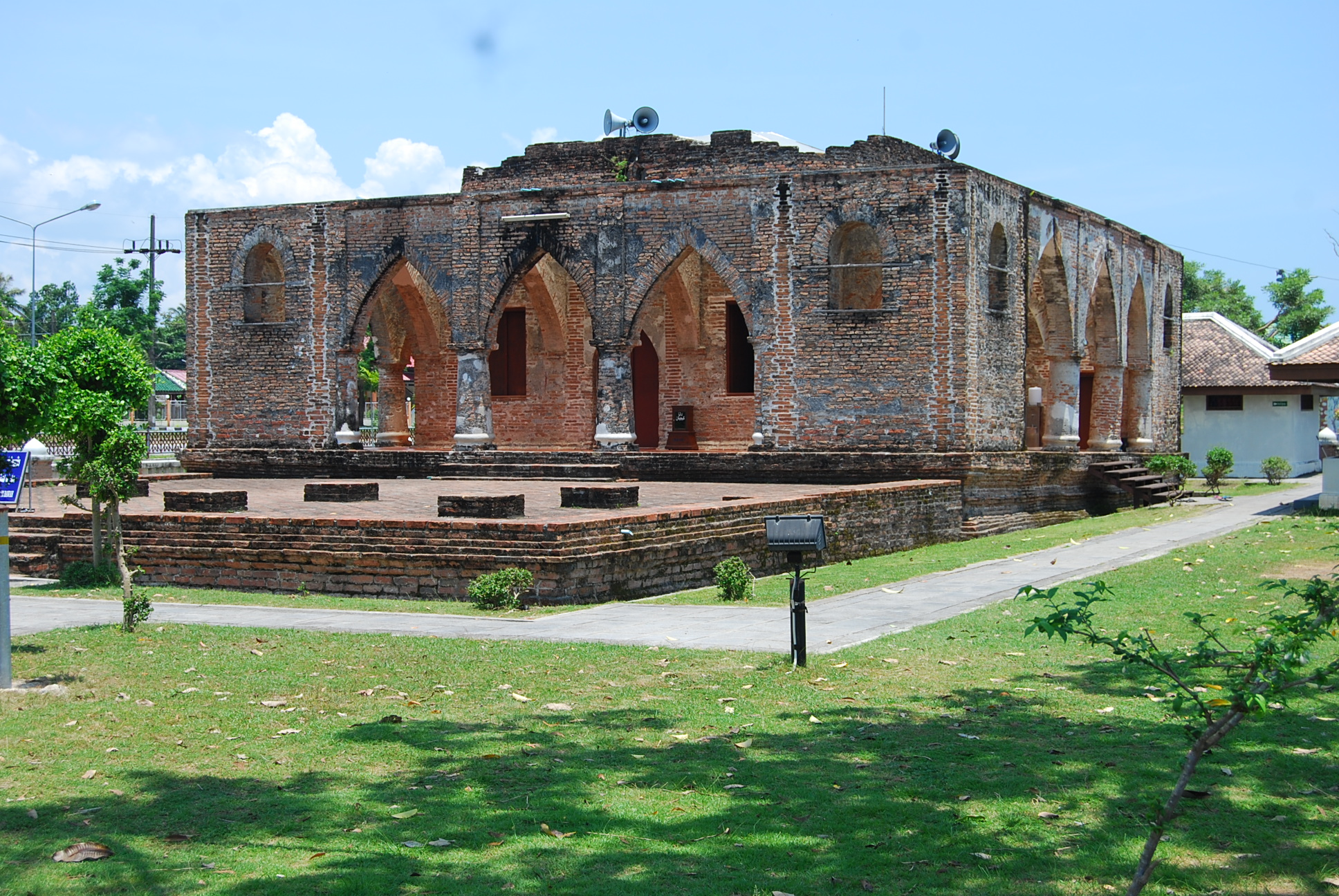
Krue Se Mosque

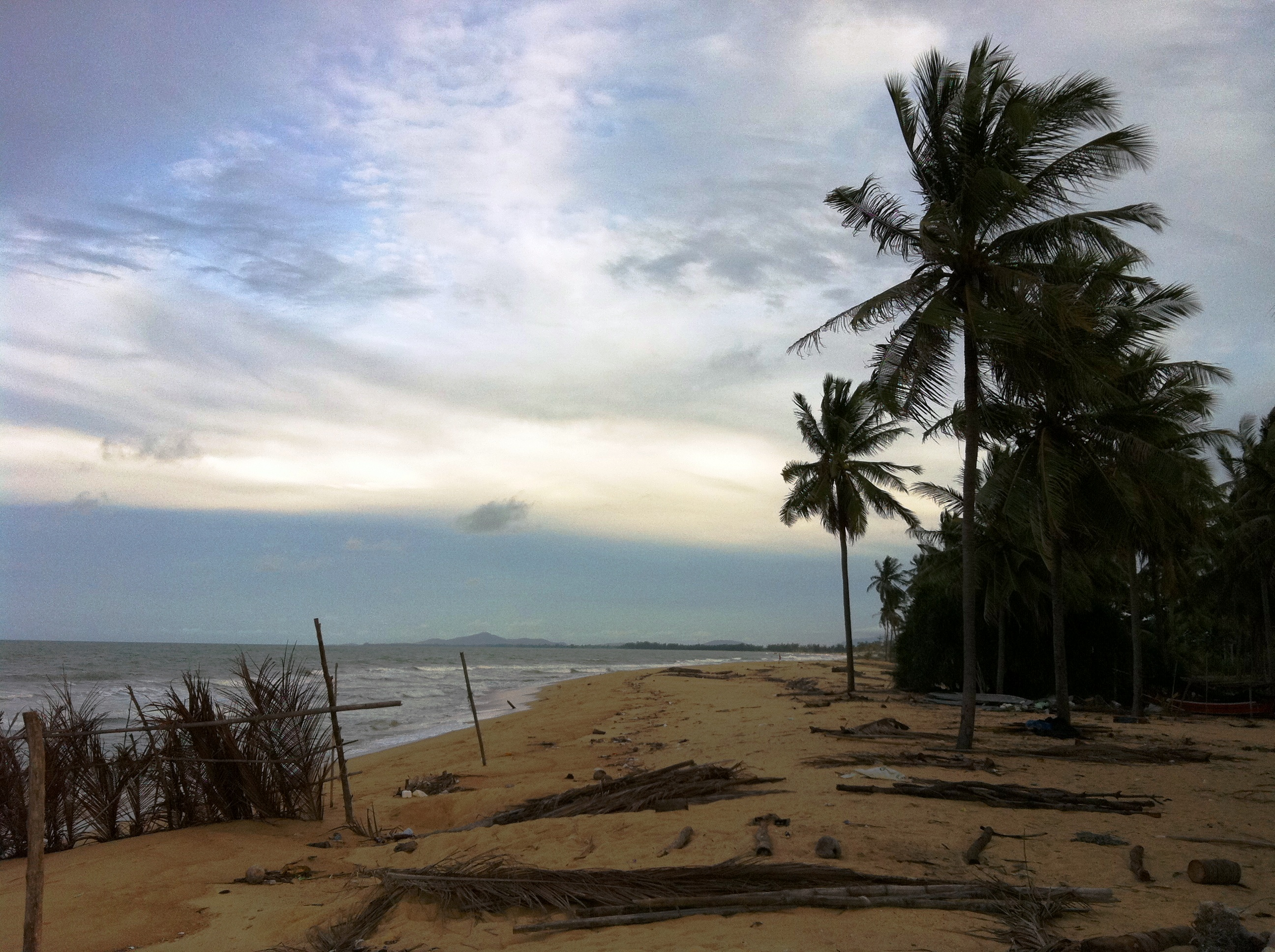
Yaring District Beach, Pattani

== See also ==
- Patani Malays
- 2007 South Thailand bombings
- Patani (historical region)
- South Thailand insurgency
