= Highway 42 (Thailand) =

Road in Southeastern Thailand

National Highway 42
- ทางหลวงแผ่นดินหมายเลข 42
- ถนนเพชรเกษมปัตตานี–นราธิวาส, ถนนเกาหลี (บาตะห์ กอลี), ถนนรามโกมุท; Phetkasem of Pattani–Narathiwat Road, Korean Road (Batah Koli), Ramkomut Road
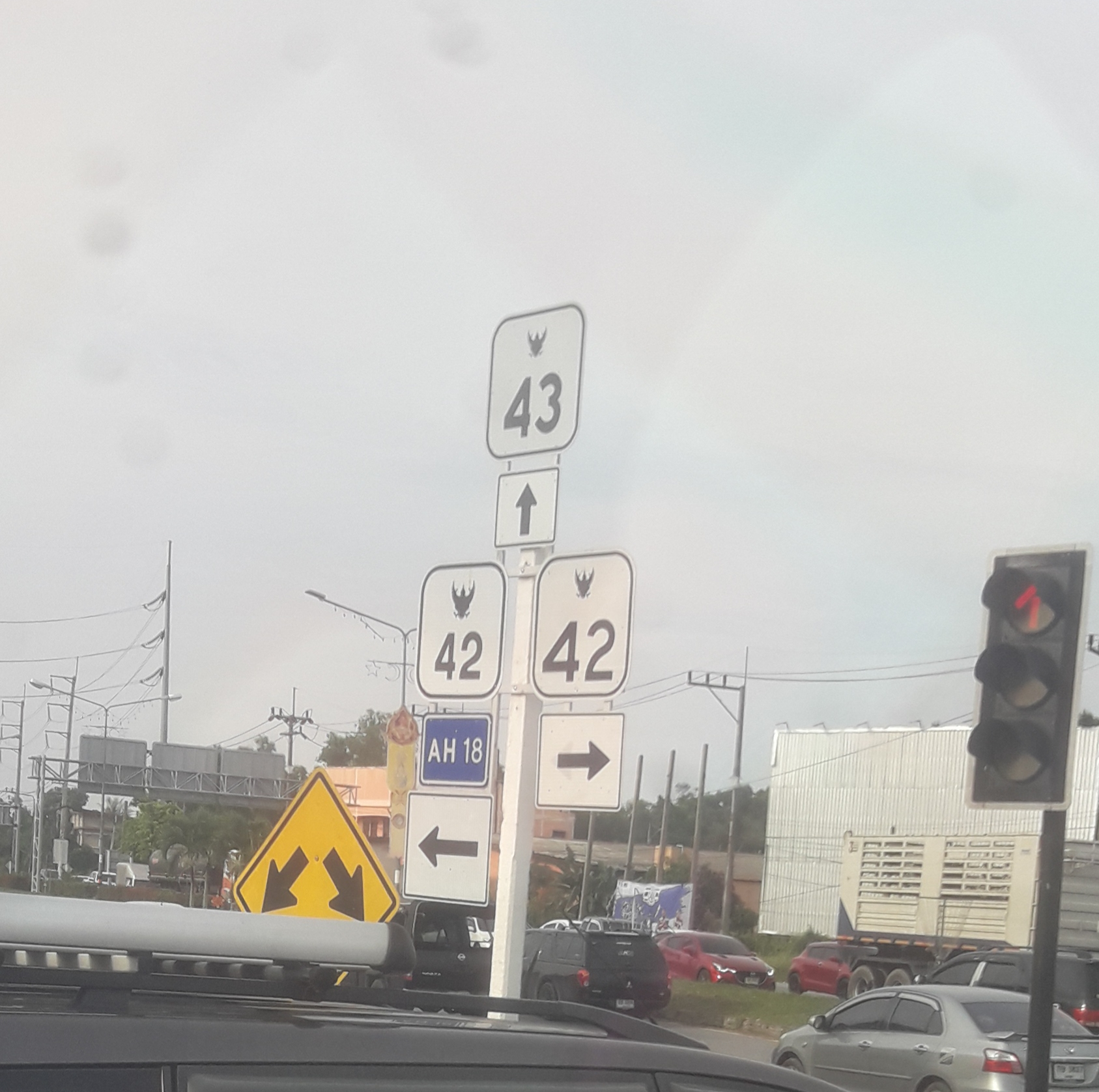
- Highway 42 in Don Yang Intersection (before 2024), Nong Chik District, Pattani Province

Route information
- Part of AH18
- Length: 262.312 km (162.993 mi)
- Existed: 1950–present

Major junctions
- West end: Hwy 4 / AH2 in Sadao (Songkhla Province)
- Hwy 408; Hwy 409; Hwy 43 / AH18; Hwy 418; Hwy 410; Hwy 43
- East end: FT 3 / AH18 in Su-ngai Kolok (Narathiwat Province)

Location
- Country: Thailand
- Provinces: Songkhla, Pattani, Narathiwat
- Major cities: Pattani, Narathiwat, Su-ngai Kolok

Highway system
- Highways in Thailand; Motorways; Asian Highways

Route 42 (Thai: ทางหลวงแผ่นดินหมายเลข 42) as known Khlong Ngae – Su-ngai Kolok Highway or Phetkasem Road of Pattani – Narathiwat in time when traveling from Pattani to Narathiwat. or Korean Road or Batah Koli in northeastern Malay language is a southeastern highway that connects Songkhla Province, Pattani Province and Narathiwat Province. There is a distance throughout the line of 263.779 kilometers.

== History ==
Before highway numbers were assigned The road in the Pattani-Narathiwat section is called Pattani–Narathiwat Highway Later it was named Ramkomut Road on December 10, 1950, when Field Marshal P. Pibulsongkram was Prime Minister. In honor of Luang Parinya Yokhawibun (Chom-Ubon Ramkomut), the master technician who supervised the construction.

South Korean company, Hyundai Engineering & Construction (Including the former president of South Korea, Lee Myung Bak) also involved in the construction of dual carriageway in Pattani (Don Rak) – Narathiwat road section as supervisor in 1965 until 1968, which is now locals called Korean Road.

In the past, Highway 42 usually routed from Ban Khlong Ngae, Sadao District , Songkhla Province to Ban Don Yang, Nong Chik District , Pattani Province. It is the main route for traveling between Songkhla Province and Pattani Province. But when there is construction of Highway 43 has increased, causing vehicles traveling to use this route instead. Because it helps to reduce time and distance better. It is also a 4-lane highway, while Highway 42, Khlong Ngae – Don Yang section. It is a 2 lane highway.

Highway 42 used to end in the city of Narathiwat. The distance at that time was approximately 198 kilometers (123 miles). Later, Highway 4084 and Highway 4057 were included as part of this highway as well. To connect to the border crossing point at Su-ngai Kolok.

== Junction and town lists ==
Legend:

- I/C - Interchange, I/S - Intersection, RSA - Rest and service area, OBR - Overhead bridge restaurant, R/R - Restaurant and rest plaza, L/B - Layby, V/P - Vista point, TN - tunnel, T/P - Toll plaza, BR - Bridge
- C - Cloverleaf, S - Stack, T-A - Trumpet-A, T-B - Trumpet-B, DT - Directional-T/Y, SDT - Semi-Directional-T/Y, P-Y - Partial-Y, D - Diamond, P-C - Partial cloverleaf, D-D - Diverging diamond, D-R - Direct ramp

Province	District	Road Section	Km	Exit	Name	Destinations	Notes
Songkhla	Sadao	Khlong Ngae – Don Yang	0+000		Sadao	Hwy 4 / AH2 – Bangkok, Songkhla, Hatyai, Dannok, Padang Besar	T-junctions
Songkhla	Sadao	Khlong Ngae – Don Yang			Phangla	SK.2039 – Hatyai	T-junctions
Songkhla	Na Thawi	Khlong Ngae – Don Yang	29+183; 29+693		Na-Thawi	Hwy 408 – Hatyai, Songkhla, Ban Prakob	Junctions
Songkhla	Na Thawi	Khlong Ngae – Don Yang			Wang Yai	SK.2032 – Nathawi; SK.2003 – Sathon	T-junctions
Songkhla	Thepha	Khlong Ngae – Don Yang	60+132		Thepha	Hwy 4085 – Chana, Ban Phraphut, Sabayoi, Kabang, Yala	Junctions
Songkhla-Pattani provincial border		Khlong Ngae – Don Yang		BR	Thayee Bridge		
Pattani	Khok Pho	Khlong Ngae – Don Yang			Khok Pho train crossing		
Pattani	Khok Pho	Khlong Ngae – Don Yang			Khok-Pho	PN.2003 – Nong Chik; PN.T1-0065 – Chang Hai Tok	Junctions
Pattani	Khok Pho	Khlong Ngae – Don Yang	82+600		Naket	PN.2010 – Ban Basa-ae, Yarang; Hwy 409 – Ban Niang, Yala, Yaha	Junctions
Pattani	Khok Pho-Nong Chik border	Khlong Ngae – Don Yang		BR	Bo Thong Bridge		
Pattani	Nong Chik	AH18; Don Yang – Don Rak	89+600		Bang Khao (Don Yang)	Hwy 43 / AH18 – Bangkok, Songkhla, Hatyai, Thepha, Yarang, Yaring, Narathiwat	Roundabout (under construction of new bridge)
Pattani	Nong Chik	AH18; Don Yang – Don Rak		BR	Bang Khao Bridge		
Pattani	Nong Chik	AH18; Don Yang – Don Rak			Nong-Chik	PN.2070 – Ban Prang; PN.2013 – Yarang	T-junctions
Pattani	Mueang Pattani	AH18; Korean Road (Don Rak – Narathiwat)	9X+XXX		Rusamilae (Don Rak)	Hwy 4296 / Hwy 4354; Nong Chik Road – Mueang Pattani	T-junctions
Pattani	Mueang Pattani	AH18; Korean Road (Don Rak – Narathiwat)	100+236		Rusamilae (Ngamae Nok)	Hwy 418; Yarang Bypass Road – Mueang Pattani, Maelan, Ban Limud, Yala	Junctions
Pattani	Mueang Pattani	AH18; Korean Road (Don Rak – Narathiwat)			Pattani River Bridge		
Pattani	Mueang Pattani	AH18; Korean Road (Don Rak – Narathiwat)	103+658		Pattani	Yarang Road – Mueang Pattani, Anoru; Hwy 410 – Yarang, Yala, Betong	Junctions (under construction of new bridge)
Pattani	Mueang Pattani	AH18; Phetkasem of Pattani–Narathiwat Road, Ramkomut Road (Ramkomut – Krue Se), Korean Road	10X+XXX		Phayatani Market	Hwy 4355; Ramkomut Road – Mueang Pattani	T-junctions
Pattani	Mueang Pattani	AH18; Phetkasem of Pattani–Narathiwat Road, Ramkomut Road (Ramkomut – Krue Se), Korean Road	107+900		Bana	Hwy 4356 – Mueang Pattani, Pattani Port	T-junctions
Pattani	Mueang Pattani	AH18; Phetkasem of Pattani–Narathiwat Road, Korean Road, Krue Se Bypass Road			Tanyong Lulo (1)	Hwy 4357 – Masjid Krue-Se, Bang Pu	Y-junction
Pattani	Mueang Pattani	AH18; Phetkasem of Pattani–Narathiwat Road, Korean Road, Krue Se Bypass Road			Tanyong Lulo (2)	Hwy 4357 – Masjid Krue-Se,Bana	Y-junction
Pattani	Mueang Pattani	AH18; Phetkasem of Pattani–Narathiwat Road, Korean Road, Yaring Bypass Road			Barahom (Pare)	Hwy 4297; Ramkomut Road – Bangpu, Yaring, Yamu	T-junctions
Pattani	Yaring	AH18; Phetkasem of Pattani–Narathiwat Road, Korean Road, Yaring Bypass Road	112+800		Ban Dee	Hwy 43; Pattani Bypass Road – Yarang, Nongchik, Hatyai, Songkhla	T-junctions
Pattani	Yaring	AH18; Phetkasem of Pattani–Narathiwat Road, Korean Road, Yaring Bypass Road	11X+XXX		Buecho	Hwy 4358 – Yaring; Local Highway (former PN.2067) – Ban Takae, Yarang, Manang Yong	Junctions
Pattani	Yaring	AH18; Phetkasem of Pattani–Narathiwat Road, Korean Road, Yaring Bypass Road	11X+XXX		Bang Pu	Hwy 4359 – Yaring; Local Highway – Ban Din Daeng, Yarang	Junctions
Pattani	Yaring	AH18; Phetkasem of Pattani–Narathiwat Road, Korean Road, Yaring Bypass Road	12X+XXX		Yaring	Local Highway (former PN.2062) – Talok Kapor; PN.2020 – Mayo, Yarang	Junctions
Pattani	Yaring	AH18; Phetkasem of Pattani–Narathiwat Road, Korean Road, Ramkomut Road (Yaring Hospital –Trobon)	12X+XX		Yamu	Hwy 4298; Ramkomut Road – Yaring	T-junctions
Pattani	Yaring	AH18; Phetkasem of Pattani–Narathiwat Road, Korean Road, Ramkomut Road (Yaring Hospital –Trobon)		BR	Khlong Tanyong Bridge		
Pattani	Yaring	AH18; Phetkasem of Pattani–Narathiwat Road, Korean Road, Ramkomut Road (Yaring Hospital –Trobon)	126+208		Tanyong Dalo (Tolang)	Hwy 4075 – Ban Nok, Panare	T-junctions
Pattani	Mayo-Panare	AH18; Phetkasem of Pattani–Narathiwat Road, Korean Road, Ramkomut Road (Yaring Hospital –Trobon)	13X+XXX		Palas	PN.2065 – Panare, Yaring; PN.2066 – Mayo, Thungyangdaeng	Junctions
Pattani	Mayo-Panare	AH18; Phetkasem of Pattani–Narathiwat Road, Korean Road, Ramkomut Road (Yaring Hospital –Trobon)	135+108		Mayo/Panare (Palas)	Hwy 4061 – Panare, Mayo, Thungyangdaeng, Yarang, Yala	Junctions
Pattani	Sai Buri	AH18; Phetkasem of Pattani–Narathiwat Road, Korean Road, Saiburi Bypass Road	145+325		Trobon	PN.2061; Ramkomut Road – Ban Chamao Samton, Saiburi; Hwy 4074 – Thungyangdaeng, Raman, Yala	Junctions
Pattani	Sai Buri	AH18; Phetkasem of Pattani–Narathiwat Road, Korean Road, Saiburi Bypass Road	14X+XX		Cho-kueyae	Hwy 4299 – Saiburi, Panare; PN.2026 - Kapho, Raman, Rueso	Junctions
Pattani	Sai Buri	AH18; Phetkasem of Pattani–Narathiwat Road, Korean Road, Saiburi Bypass Road		BR	Saiburi River Bridge		
Pattani	Sai Buri	AH18; Phetkasem of Pattani–Narathiwat Road, Korean Road, Saiburi Bypass Road	152+866		Saiburi	Hwy 4060 – Taluban, Saiburi, Kapho, Raman, Si Sakhon	Junctions
Pattani	Sai Buri	AH18; Phetkasem of Pattani–Narathiwat Road, Korean Road, Ramkomut Road	154+559		Lahan	Hwy 4157; Ramkomut Road – Saiburi, Panare, Ban Talokapo	T-junctions
Pattani-Narathiwat provincial border		AH18; Phetkasem of Pattani–Narathiwat Road, Korean Road, Ramkomut Road		BR	Kodo Bridge		
Narathiwat	Bacho	AH18; Phetkasem of Pattani–Narathiwat Road, Korean Road, Ramkomut Road	159+042		Ban Kodo	Hwy 4136 – Maikaen, Mueang Narathiwat	T-junctions
Narathiwat	Bacho	AH18; Phetkasem of Pattani–Narathiwat Road, Korean Road, Ramkomut Road	160+461		Palukasamo	Hwy 4168 – Kapho, Raman, Yala; Hwy 4167 – Maikaen, Bacho, Mueang Narathiwat	Junctions
Narathiwat	Bacho	AH18; Phetkasem of Pattani–Narathiwat Road, Korean Road, Ramkomut Road	171+196		Bacho	Local Highway – Pataerayo Waterfall, Raman; Hwy 4155 – Mueang Narathiwat	Junctions
Narathiwat	Yi-ngo	AH18; Phetkasem of Pattani–Narathiwat Road, Korean Road, Ramkomut Road	180+096		Tapoyo (Yango)	Hwy 4066 – Rueso, Raman, Yala, Mueang Narathiwat	Junctions
Narathiwat	Yi-ngo	AH18; Phetkasem of Pattani–Narathiwat Road; Korean Road, Yi-ngo Bypass Road			Yi-ngo (1)	Hwy 4300; Ramkomut Road – Ra-ngae, Rueso, Si Sakhon	Y-junctions
Narathiwat	Yi-ngo	AH18; Phetkasem of Pattani–Narathiwat Road, Korean Road, Ramkomut Road			Yi-ngo (2)	Hwy 4300; Ramkomut Road – Ra-ngae, Rueso, Si Sakhon	Y-junctions
Narathiwat	Mueang Narathiwat	AH18; Phetkasem of Pattani–Narathiwat Road, Korean Road, Ramkomut Road	193+536		Narathiwat	Hwy 4084 – Bang Nak, Takbai	T-junctions
Narathiwat	Mueang Narathiwat	AH18; Narathiwat Bypass Road	197+333		Lamphu	Hwy 4055; Ra-ngae Markha Road – Mueang Narathiwat, Ra-ngae, Chanae, Sukhirin	Junctions
Narathiwat	Mueang Narathiwat	AH18; Narathiwat Bypass Road		BR	Bang Nara Bridge		
Narathiwat	Mueang Narathiwat	AH18; Sapom–Tak Bai (Former Highway 4084 section)	211+988		Sapom	Hwy 4084 – Mueang Narathiwat, Yi-ngo	Junctions
Narathiwat	Tak Bai	AH18; Tak Bai–Su-ngai Kolok (Former Highway 4057 section)	229+962		Tak-Bai	Hwy 4327 (former Highway 4084) – Chehe	T-junctions
Narathiwat	Tak Bai	AH18; Tak Bai–Su-ngai Kolok (Former Highway 4057 section)		BR	Chehe Bridge		
Narathiwat	Su-ngai Kolok	AH18; Sai Thong 5 Road	262+283		Pasemat	NT.2031; Su-ngai Kolok Ring Road – Su-ngai Padi	T-junctions
Narathiwat	Su-ngai Kolok	AH18; Sai Thong 5 Road			Su-ngai Kolok train crossing		
Narathiwat	Su-ngai Kolok	AH18; Su-ngai Kolok – Kolok River Bridge	262+929		Su-ngai Kolok	Hwy 4056; Su-ngai Padi Road – Su-ngai Padi, Cho-airong, Mueang Narathiwat; Hwy 4057 – Waeng, Buketa, Lochut, Sukhirin	Junctions
Narathiwat	Su-ngai Kolok	AH18; Su-ngai Kolok – Kolok River Bridge			Su-ngai Kolok Checkpoint		
Narathiwat	Su-ngai Kolok	AH18; Su-ngai Kolok – Kolok River Bridge	263+779	BR	Kolok River Bridge		Crossing; Length: 109.73 m
ASEAN Thailand–Malaysia Border; Through to FT 3 / AH18 Malaysia Federal Route 3

== Sources ==
- ระบบสารสนเทศโครงข่ายทางหลวง กรมทางหลวง กระทรวงคมนาคม
- Google แผนที่
- สำนักงานศุลกากรภูมิภาคที่ 4 - สำนัก/ด่านศุลกากร
