= Highway 43 (Thailand) =

Road in Southeastern Thailand

National Highway 43
- ทางหลวงแผ่นดินหมายเลข 43
- ถนนเอเชียน; ถนนเลี่ยงเมืองปัตตานี Asian Road; Pattani Bypass Road
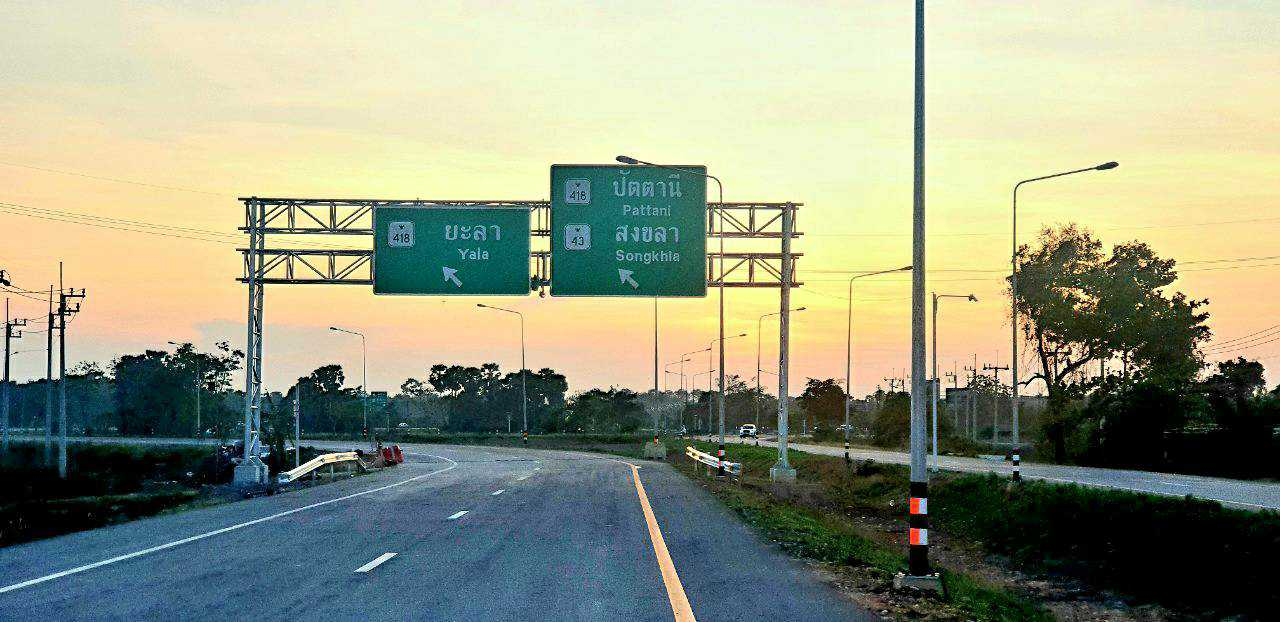
- Highway 43 in Nong Chik, Pattani Province

Route information
- Part of AH18
- Length: 109.152 km (67.824 mi)

Major junctions
- West end: Hwy 4 / AH2; Hwy 407 in Hat Yai (Songkhla province)
- Hwy 425 in Hatyai (under construction); Hwy 408 in Chana; Hwy 42 / AH18 in Nong Chik; Hwy 418 in Nong Chik; Hwy 410 in Mueang Pattani
- East end: Hwy 42 / AH18 in Yaring (Pattani province)

Location
- Country: Thailand
- Provinces: Songkhla, Pattani
- Major cities: Hat Yai, Pattani

Highway system
- Highways in Thailand; Motorways; Asian Highways

Highway 43 (Thai: ทางหลวงแผ่นดินหมายเลข 43), Hat Yai – Yaring or Khlong Wa – Yaring or Khlong Wa – Ban Dee It is one of the most important national highways in Southeastern Thailand and also part of Asian Highway 18 as concurrent of this route. This highway is a new highway that was cut to shorten the distance from Songkhla Province to Pattani Province after Highway 42's distance was farther than this highway. This route is an 4-lane highway along the entire route with a total distance of 109.152+ kilometers. it was also under responsible by Songkhla Highway Subdistrict 1, Songkhla Highway Subdistrict 2 (Na Mom) and Pattani Highway Subdistrict.

== Highway details ==
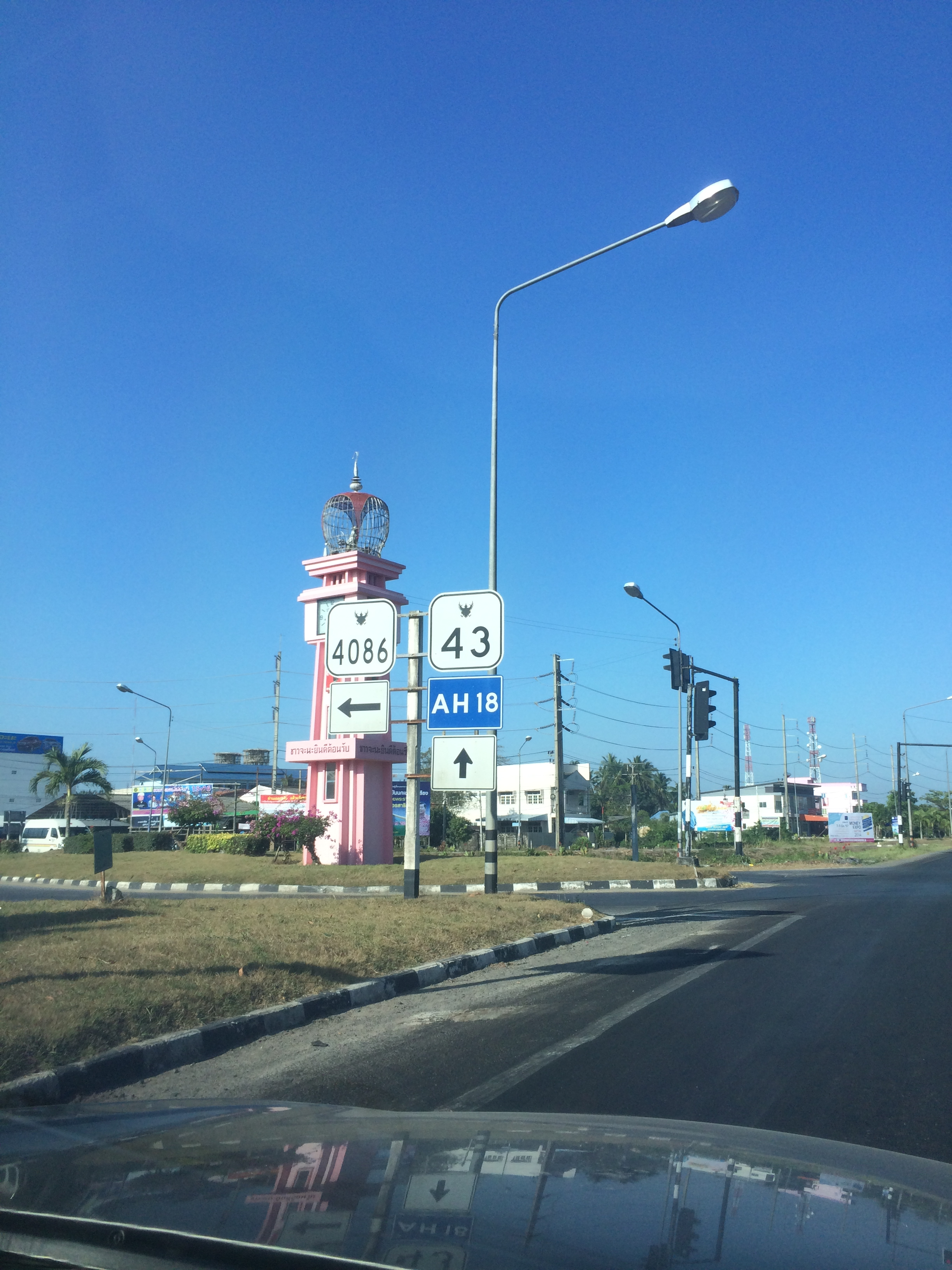
Highway 43 in Chana intersection, Songkhla Province

Highway 43 is main route of Songkhla Province and Pattani Province. The highway begins in Khlong Wa intersection, Khohong Subdistrict, Hat Yai District, Songkhla Province. The highway has 4 traffic lanes, heading east through Na Mom District, Chana District, Thepha District, entering Pattani Province at Nong Chik District and continuing to Mueang Pattani District then ends at Ban Dee Intersection, Yaring District, Pattani Province. On Songkhla Province is 74.397 kilometers. On Pattani Province is 34.755 kilometers.

As 12 March 2024, Department of Highway (DOH) opened 14km Pattani Bypass Highway (Maphrao Tondiaw Roundabout (Nong Chik)–Ban Dee (Yaring)) after 5 year of construction within total of 109.152 kilometers.

== History ==
In the past, Highway 43's origin was in Kheha Intersection when Phetkasem road goes to Rattaphum to Hat Yai (now part of Highway 406, Highway 4287 and Highway 407) and Highway 43 terminus at Khlong Wa intersection, the current kilometer zero of this route was located.

Until now, Phetkasem Road extending and bypass its old route to Khlong Wa intersection, Highway 43 extended entire route of Highway 4131 to Khuan Mit intersection and a section of Highway 408 to Paching intersection. Highway 4086 were extended to Don Yang intersection but entrance to Chana was part of the route itself and entrance to Sakom Pakbang is part of Highway 4370, making Highway 43's terminus before extending to Ban Dee Intersection, its current terminus.

== Junction lists ==
Legend:

- I/C - Interchange, I/S - Intersection, RSA - Rest and service area, OBR - Overhead bridge restaurant, R/R - Restaurant and rest plaza, L/B - Layby, V/P - Vista point, TN - tunnel, T/P - Toll plaza, BR - Bridge
- C - Cloverleaf, S - Stack, T-A - Trumpet-A, T-B - Trumpet-B, DT - Directional-T/Y, SDT - Semi-Directional-T/Y, P-Y - Partial-Y, D - Diamond, P-C - Partial cloverleaf, D-D - Diverging diamond, D-R - Direct ramp

Province	District	Road section	Km	Exit	Name	Destinations	Notes
Songkhla	Hat Yai	AH18; Asian Road, Hat Yai–Pattani Road, Khlong Wa – Khuan Mit (Former Highway 4131)	0+000		Hat Yai	Hwy 407 – Mueang Songkhla; Hwy 4 / AH2 – Bangkok, Phatthalung, Bang Klam, Sadao, Dannok, Padang Besar	Junctions
Songkhla	Hat Yai	AH18; Asian Road, Hat Yai–Pattani Road, Khlong Wa – Khuan Mit (Former Highway 4131)			Ban Phru	Hwy 425 – Sadaom, Hat Yai International Airport, Rattaphum	*Under Planned*
Songkhla	Na Mom	AH18; Asian Road, Hat Yai–Pattani Road, Khlong Wa – Khuan Mit (Former Highway 4131)			Namom	SK.R 1-0087 – Phichit, Sadao	Junctions
Songkhla	Na Mom	AH18; Asian Road, Hat Yai–Pattani Road, Khlong Wa – Khuan Mit (Former Highway 4131)			Na Mom train crossing		
Songkhla	Chana	AH18; Asian Road, Hat Yai–Pattani Road, Khlong Wa – Khuan Mit (Former Highway 4131)			Khlong Pia	SK.2031 – Mueang Songkhla, Ban Thungkho	Junctions
Songkhla	Chana	AH18; Asian Road, Hat Yai–Pattani Road, Songkhla–Na Thawi Road (Khuan Mit–Paching/Former Highway 408 section)	24+588		Khuan Mid	Hwy 408 – Mueang Songkhla, Singhanakhon, Nakhon Si Thammarat	T-junctions
Songkhla	Chana	AH18; Asian Road, Hat Yai–Pattani Road, Songkhla–Na Thawi Road (Khuan Mit–Paching/Former Highway 408 section)	30+423		Paching	Hwy 408 – Na Thawi, Ban Prakob	T-junctions
Songkhla	Chana	AH18; Asian Road, Hat Yai–Pattani Road, Chana–Don Yang (Former Highway 4086 section)	34+670		Chana	SK.2017 – Taling Chan; Hwy 4086 – Paching, Na Thawi, Ban Prakob	Junctions
Songkhla	Thepha	AH18; Asian Road, Hat Yai–Pattani Road, Pakbang Bypass Road			Sakom (1)	Hwy 4370 – Ban Pakbang	T-junctions
Songkhla	Thepha	AH18; Asian Road, Hat Yai–Pattani Road, Chana–Don Yang (Former Highway 4086 section)			Sakom (2)	Hwy 4370 – Ban Pakbang	T-junctions
Songkhla	Thepha	AH18; Asian Road, Hat Yai–Pattani Road, Chana–Don Yang (Former Highway 4086 section)	63+985		Thepha	Hwy 4085 – Saba Yoi, Kabang, Yala, Ban Phraphut	Junctions
Songkhla	Thepha	AH18; Asian Road, Hat Yai–Pattani Road, Chana–Don Yang (Former Highway 4086 section)			Ban Phraphut Bridge		
Pattani	Nong Chik	Pattani Bypass Road	87+152		Nong Chik	Hwy 42 / AH18 – Mueang Pattani, Yaring, Khok Pho, Thepha, Sadao	Junctions
Pattani	Nong Chik	Pattani Bypass Road			2nd Bo Thong Bridge		
Pattani	Nong Chik	Pattani Bypass Road	94+952		Lipasango	Hwy 418 – Mueang Pattani, Yarang, Maelan, Yala	Roundabout
Pattani	Nong Chik-Mueang Pattani border	Pattani Bypass Road		BR	Pattani River Bridge		
Pattani	Mueang Pattani	Pattani Bypass Road			Pattani	Hwy 410 – Chabangtiko, Yarang, Yala, Betong	Roundabout
Pattani	Yarang	Pattani Bypass Road			Yarang		
Pattani	Yaring	Pattani Bypass Road	109+152		Yaring (Ban Dee)	Hwy 42 / AH18 – Mueang Pattani, Mayo, Narathiwat, Su-ngai Kolok	T-junctions
