= 2014–2015 floods in Southeast Asia and South Asia =

Natural disasters in Asia

- Date: 14 December 2014 – 2 January 2015 Durations by country: 14 December 2014 – 30 December 2014 (in Indonesia); 14 December 2014 – 2 January 2015 (in Thailand); 15 December 2014 – 2 January 2015 (in Malaysia); 19 December 2014 – 2 January 2015 (in Sri Lanka)
- Location: Indonesia Malaysia Sri Lanka Thailand
- Deaths: 75 killed

Beginning on 14 December 2014, a series of floods from the northeast monsoon hit Indonesia, West Malaysia, Southern Thailand, and later Sri Lanka in South Asia. More than 100,000 people were evacuated in Indonesia, 200,000 in Malaysia, and several thousand in Thailand. Floods also affected 1,100,000 people in Sri Lanka.

== Causes ==
Malaysian Meteorological Department National Weather Centre senior meteorological officer Mohd Hisham Mohd Anip attributed the flooding in northern Malaysia to the full moon and the presence of northeast monsoon winds blowing consistently across the South China Sea from November 2014 until March 2015. He noted that rivers overflowed when incessant rainfall caused water from the upstream to not reach the confluence. The Malaysian government has promised to undertake a thorough investigation to identify the real cause of these floods especially in the east coast when the floods have receded. The year's heavy rains were caused by a southeast monsoon blowing across the South China Sea, making the sea warmer than usual. Scientists have predicted that as climate change worsens, storm patterns will become less predictable and more severe. Massive development without care for the environment and drainage problems have been cited as contributing factors.

== Affected regions ==
Various countries have been affected by floods with Malaysia topping the list of evacuees.

Country	Fatalities	Evacuees	Ref
Indonesia	0	120,000	
Malaysia	21	237,037	
Thailand	15	10,000	
Sri Lanka	39	50,832	
Total	75	417,869 +	

=== Southeast Asia ===
==== Indonesia ====
Heavy rains in North Sumatra caused flooding in most areas from 14 December, but as of 17 December the water was receding. On 19 December, another flood damaged 525 hectares (1,300 acres) of farmland in eight districts in Indragiri Hulu Regency, Riau. Hundreds of houses in the Bengkalis Regency of Riau were submerged waist-deep (1 metre (3.3 ft)), but the approximately 500 residents are still at home as there is no place to take refuge. The villagers cannot do anything because of a limited budget. In the Tamiang District of Aceh, flooding forced about 28,000 people to take shelter on higher ground. A total of 94,500 people have taken refuge in Aceh as of 27 December. As of 27 December, about 100,000 people had been evacuated nationwide, with the number of patients seeking treatment at command posts still increasing.

Between 26 and 28 December, most floods in such areas in Aceh have receded.

==== Malaysia ====
Heavy rains since 15 December forced 3,390 people in Kelantan and 4,209 people in Terengganu to flee their homes. Several Keretapi Tanah Melayu (KTM) intercity train services along the East Coast route were disrupted on 18 December following the floods. On 20 December, the area of Kajang, Selangor, was also hit by serious floods. By 23 December, most rivers in Kelantan, Pahang, Perak and Terengganu had reached dangerous levels. Due to rising water levels, most businesses were affected, and about 60,000 people were displaced in the next day. The state of Kelantan had the most evacuees (20,468 to 24,765), followed by Terengganu (21,606), Pahang (10,825), Perak (1,030), Sabah (336) and Perlis (143).

The situation continues to worsen in Kelantan and Terengganu, due to heavy rain. Most roads in Kelantan have been closed. The worst-hit district in Terengganu is Kemaman, followed by Dungun, Kuala Terengganu, Hulu Terengganu, Besut and Marang. In Pahang, the worst-hit areas are Kuantan, Maran, Jerantut, Lipis and Pekan. Dozens of foreign tourists were stranded at a resort in a Malaysian national park in Pahang. Most were travellers from Canada, Britain, Australia and Romania. All were rescued via boat and helicopter. In Kedah, at least 51 people were evacuated. A teenager in Perlis was the first victim to die in this flood.

In southern Malaysia, between 300 and 350 people have been displaced in both Johor and Negeri Sembilan. The number of evacuees nationwide reached more than 200,000 by 28 December, with 10 people killed. The flooding is considered the country's worst in decades. However, the exact numbers of evacuees, missing persons and deaths are unknown, as the Malaysian flood centre was unable to provide any accurate figures. Some victims were found in miserable conditions after surviving on one meal of rice a day while being stranded in the floods, who was interviewed by Aaron Ngui. On 31 December, a Royal Malaysia Police Ecureuill AS 355F2 helicopter crashed during a patrol in Kelantan, injuring four crews on board.

As of 2 January 2015, floodwaters continued to recede and the number of evacuees in Kelantan, Terengganu, Pahang and Perak continued to reduce.

==== Thailand ====
On 21 December, a Bell 206 helicopter which departed for relief missions crashed in Yala's Muang District due to bad weather, injuring four crewmen. Because of the incident, Thai southern army has imposed a ban on all types of aircraft from 22 to 26 December and were ordered to use only ground vehicles to patrol flooded areas. A large number of districts in Narathiwat Province have been declared disaster zones with 115,853 residents from 30,624 households been affected. Eight of sixteen districts in Songkhla Province, including Hat Yai, Sadao, Rattaphum, Khuan Niang, Chana, Thepha, Na Thawi and Sabai Yoi also have been declared disaster zones. In Yala Province, more than 50,000 residents have been affected. As of 30 December, 15 people have been killed in the flooding.

On 26 December, rains in Narathiwat and Pattani provinces have stopped, while flooding in Phatthalung has eased. Continuous aid was distributed to affected residents in Songkhla Province including to Malaysian residents in the border of Narathiwat as Thai Prime Minister had heard that around 40,000 Malaysians living along the border were suffering.

=== South Asia ===
==== Sri Lanka ====
An estimated 1.1 million people were affected by torrential rainfall, widespread floods, landslides, mudslides and high winds since 19 December 2014. Over 6,400 houses are reportedly fully destroyed and an estimated 18,537 houses are partially damaged. There were 39 deaths, with 20 people injured and 2 people still missing, UN's Office for the Coordination of Humanitarian Affairs (OCHA) reported.

With the flood situation being gradually normalised, people living in safety centres or with host families have begun to return home.

== Effects ==
=== Healthcare ===
As of 29 December, the flooding has affected 102 health facilities in West Malaysia, 38 of which are still operating. Helicopters were used to evacuate patients from hospital as the flood worsened. Most hospital staff have been working tirelessly for over five days.

In Thailand, sandbag barriers were stacked around Nong Chik Hospital in Pattani, with four pumps working around the clock to keep out the flood water. Sandbags were also stacked at Tambon Pakaharang health promotion hospital. Some equipment was relocated to higher ground as a precaution. However, both hospitals continued their regular daily operations.

=== Education ===
Three main universities in the states of Kelantan and Terengganu in Malaysia were affected by floods. Most students in Kelantan university decided to flee from their university in view of worsening flood crisis.

In Thailand, 237 schools were closed due to floods.

=== Economy ===
Palm oil and rubber prices have surged as flooding has disrupted supplies from Thailand and Malaysia. Rubber output in Thailand and Malaysia will drop at least 30 per cent and prices been predicted to rise further. As floodwaters in Malaysia are not receding, palm oil production decline sharply.

=== Social ===
In Malaysia, shortage of food supplies, electricity, clean water, banking services and erratic communication problems continue to affect flood victims after the flood started to recede. Lack of banking services has caused some petrol stations to run out of small change. Some victims survived on donated relief items while other desperate flood victims started to fight or steal for food and valuables from abandoned homes.

Flood victims at Rantau Panjang, Kelantan, Malaysia, started to cross Golok River into Su-ngai Kolok town as the floods in Thailand began to subside. Residents of Rantau Panjang shop for essential items at Su-ngai Kolok Municipality Market. At least six petrol stations in Su-ngai Kolok district were closed temporarily due to overwhelming demand for petrol. Authorities also started to release excessive water from Bang Lang Dam which would later affect riverside communities on the banks of Pattani River in Bannang Sata and Krong Pinang District.

== Response ==
Indonesia
Some Indonesian agencies prepared shelters in the affected districts, including at police and military headquarters and houses of worship. About 400 volunteers were mobilised to distribute aid and the Indonesian Military (TNI) boosted its personnel numbers.

Malaysia
The Malaysian government mobilised all available assets to help in flood rescue operations, the number of rescue team members was increased, and $14 million was allocated to manage relief centres. An additional $142 million in funding was announced. Various non-governmental organisations have contributed their assistance.

Thailand
Prime Minister Prayut Chan-o-cha has instructed related officials to quickly provide aid to victims in the southern floods. Following the instruction, soldiers in Thailand have started distributing fresh water to flood victims and stopping cars from entering flooded roads. Deputy Minister of Interior Suthee Markboon has assigned the Disaster Prevention and Mitigation Office in each province to urgently deliver assistance to people affected by flooding, survey the damages and expedite a recovery plan. The Department of Disaster Prevention and Mitigation (DDPM) has cooperated with the military and other units related to flood relief in each province to install water pumps and assess damages caused by floods.

Sri Lanka
More than 7,000 army personnel been deployed to flood-affected areas for rescue and relief operations.

== Controversies ==
Some victims in Malaysia have accused the government of being slow to provide assistance. As Malaysian Prime Minister Najib Razak was away, his deputy, Muhyiddin Yassin, was in charge for the flood crisis. However, the Prime Minister later ended his vacation amidst criticism from the public when he was seen playing golf with Barack Obama in Hawaii, United States. Najib stressed that the golf game was necessary in establishing diplomatic ties with the United States and the event has been planned much earlier even before the flood started. Rescue missions have been difficult due to uncertain weather conditions and some residents' refusal to evacuate.
