= Highway 418 (Thailand) =

Road in Thailand

National Highway 418
- ทางหลวงแผ่นดินหมายเลข 418
- ถนนเลี่ยงเมืองยะรัง; Yarang Bypass Highway

Route information
- Length: 35.648 km (22.151 mi)
- Existed: 2002–present

Major junctions
- North end: Hwy 4296 in Mueang Pattani, Pattani
- Hwy 42 / AH18 in Mueang Pattani; Hwy 43 in Nong Chik
- South end: Hwy 409 in Mueang Yala, Yala

Location
- Country: Thailand
- Provinces: Pattani, Yala
- Districts: Mueang Pattani, Nong Chik, Maelan, Mueang Yala

Highway system
- Highways in Thailand; Motorways; Asian Highways

Highway 418 or Ngamae–Thasap or Yarang Bypass Highway, has a total distance of 35.649 kilometres (22.151 mi) from Ban Khlong Khut, Nong Chik District, Pattani Province, to Ban Thasap, Thasap Subdistrict, Mueang Yala District, Yala Province. It is a construction project of the Army Engineers to help solve problems in the southern border provinces. It is a standard four-lane highway, helping to shorten the distance by 13 kilometres (8.1 mi) from the original route for the benefit of travel and transportation of goods in the southern border provinces.

This highway was opened for testing on 15 November 2009 and handed back to Highways Office 18 (Songkhla), with Prime Minister Abhisit Vejjajiva presiding over the official opening and handover ceremony on 7 January 2010.

== Construction and obstacles ==
The Highway 418 project had a contract signed with the contractor since July 2002 and construction was carried out with a budget of 703.50 million baht. However, since this project occurred during the transitional period of the unrest in the 3 southern border provinces, which occurred since January 2004, it became an obstacle for the contractor, to the point of having to terminate the contract and abandon the construction work in the end.

Later, the Cabinet resolved on 27 November 2006 to assign the Department of Military Engineering to be responsible for the completion of the project. The test run was conducted on 15 November 2009, with a total construction period of 720 days according to the contract. All together, the construction of this highway took more than 8 years and cost 1 billion baht. Due to higher than normal material prices in the area, labor shortages, and the cost of taking care of the safety of the officers during the construction, the Department of Military Engineering requested an additional budget of 204 million baht from the construction budget of 1 billion baht.

== Spceial features ==
Highway 418 is different from other highways in the three southern border provinces. It is the first four-lane standard highway in the southern border provinces. There are no intersections along the way, but an elevated road with approximately 20 bridges is used. This means that there are no traffic lights on this highway, allowing users to travel faster. It also shortens the distance from Highway 409 by 13 kilometers, which has only two lanes. The journey takes 45 minutes, while Highway 418 takes only 25 minutes.

== Junction lists ==
Legend:

- I/C - Interchange, I/S - Intersection, RSA - Rest and service area, OBR - Overhead bridge restaurant, R/R - Restaurant and rest plaza, L/B - Layby, V/P - Vista point, TN - tunnel, T/P - Toll plaza, BR - Bridge
- C - Cloverleaf, S - Stack, T-A - Trumpet-A, T-B - Trumpet-B, DT - Directional-T/Y, SDT - Semi-Directional-T/Y, P-Y - Partial-Y, D - Diamond, P-C - Partial cloverleaf, D-D - Diverging diamond, D-R - Direct ramp

Province	District	Km	Exit	Name	Destinations	Notes
Pattani	Mueang Pattani	0+000		Pattani (Ngamae Nai)	Hwy 4296 – Don Rak, Nong Chik, Rusamilae, Mueang Pattani	T-junctions
Pattani	Mueang Pattani	0+25X		Pattani (Ngamae Nok)	Hwy 42 / AH18 – Bangkok, Sadao, Songkhla, Hat Yai, Nong Chik, Yaring, Narathiwat, Su-ngai Kolok	Junctions
Pattani	Nong Chik	6+1XX		Nong Chik (Maphrao Tondiao)	Hwy 43 – Bangkok, Songkhla, Hat Yai, Khok Pho, Yarang, Yala, Yaring, Narathiwat, Su-ngai Kolok	Roundabout
Pattani	Mae Lan			Mae Lan	PN.3058	Interchanges
Pattani	Mae Lan		BR	Mae Lan railroad bridge		
Yala	Mueang Yala			Seven Wells Roundabout		Roundabout
Yala	Mueang Yala	35.649		Yala (Thasap)	Hwy 409 – Yaha, Khok Pho, Songkhla, Mueang Yala, Raman, Krong Pinang	T-interchanges
