= Pattani Airport =

Airport in southern Thailand

Pattani Airport ท่าอากาศยานปัตตานี
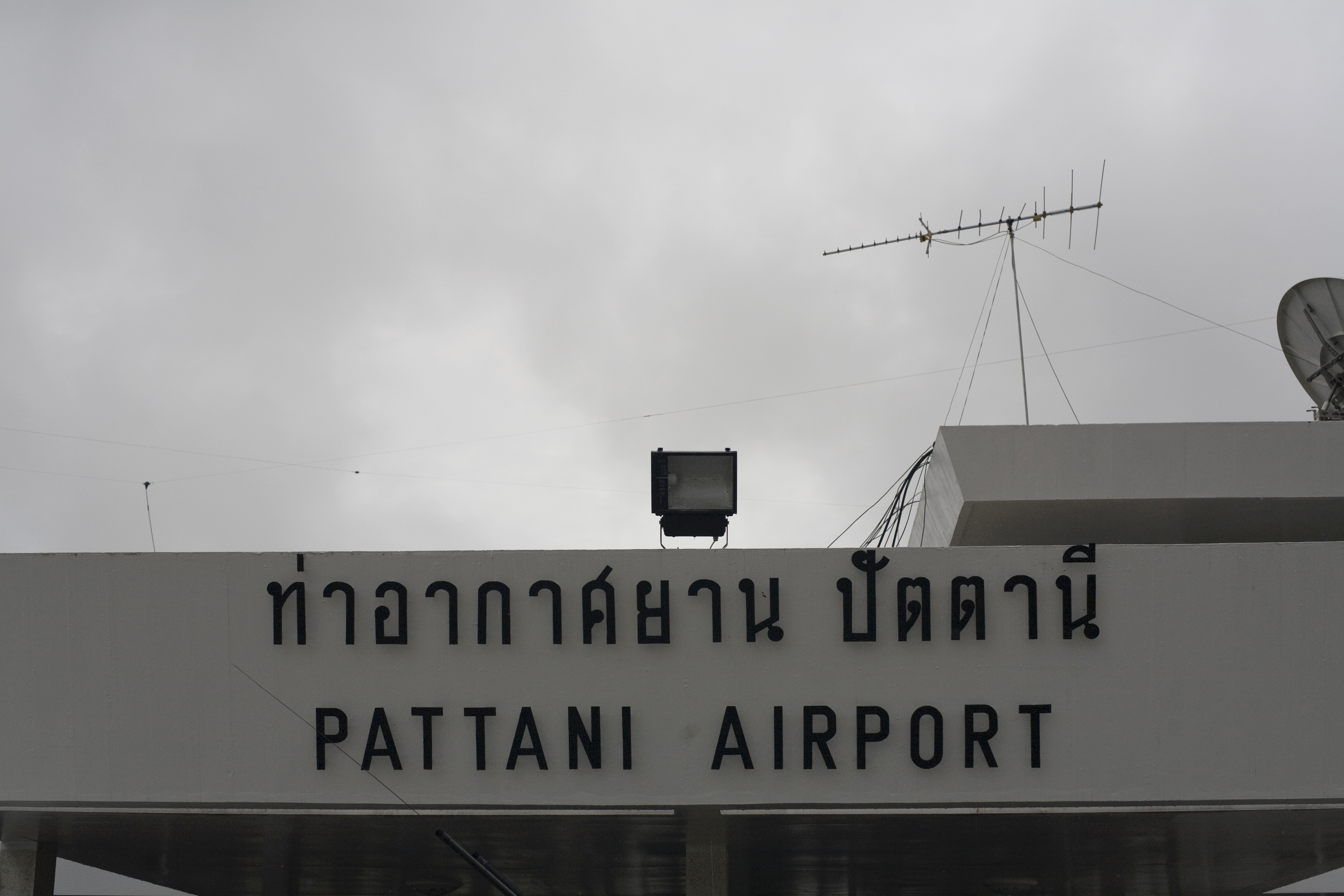
- IATA: PAN; ICAO: VTSK

Summary
- Airport type: Public / Military
- Owner: Royal Thai Army
- Operator: Department of Airports
- Serves: Pattani
- Location: Bo Thong, Nong Chik, Pattani, Thailand
- Opened: 1963; 63 years ago
- Elevation AMSL: 8 ft / 2 m
- Coordinates: 06°47′08″N 101°09′13″E

Maps
- Location of airport in Thailand
- Interactive map of Pattani Airport

Runways
Direction	Length		Surface
Direction	ft	m	Surface
08/26	4,593	1,400	Asphalt
- Sources: skyvector.com, iata.org

Pattani Airport (IATA: PAN, ICAO: VTSK) is in Bo Thong subdistrict, Nong Chik district, Pattani province in southern Thailand.

Pattani airport receives flights from the Royal Thai Air Force supporting counter-insurgency operations in the Southern provinces.
