= Wat Chang Hai railway station =

Railway station in Khuan Nori, Thailand

Wat Chang Hai วัดช้างให้
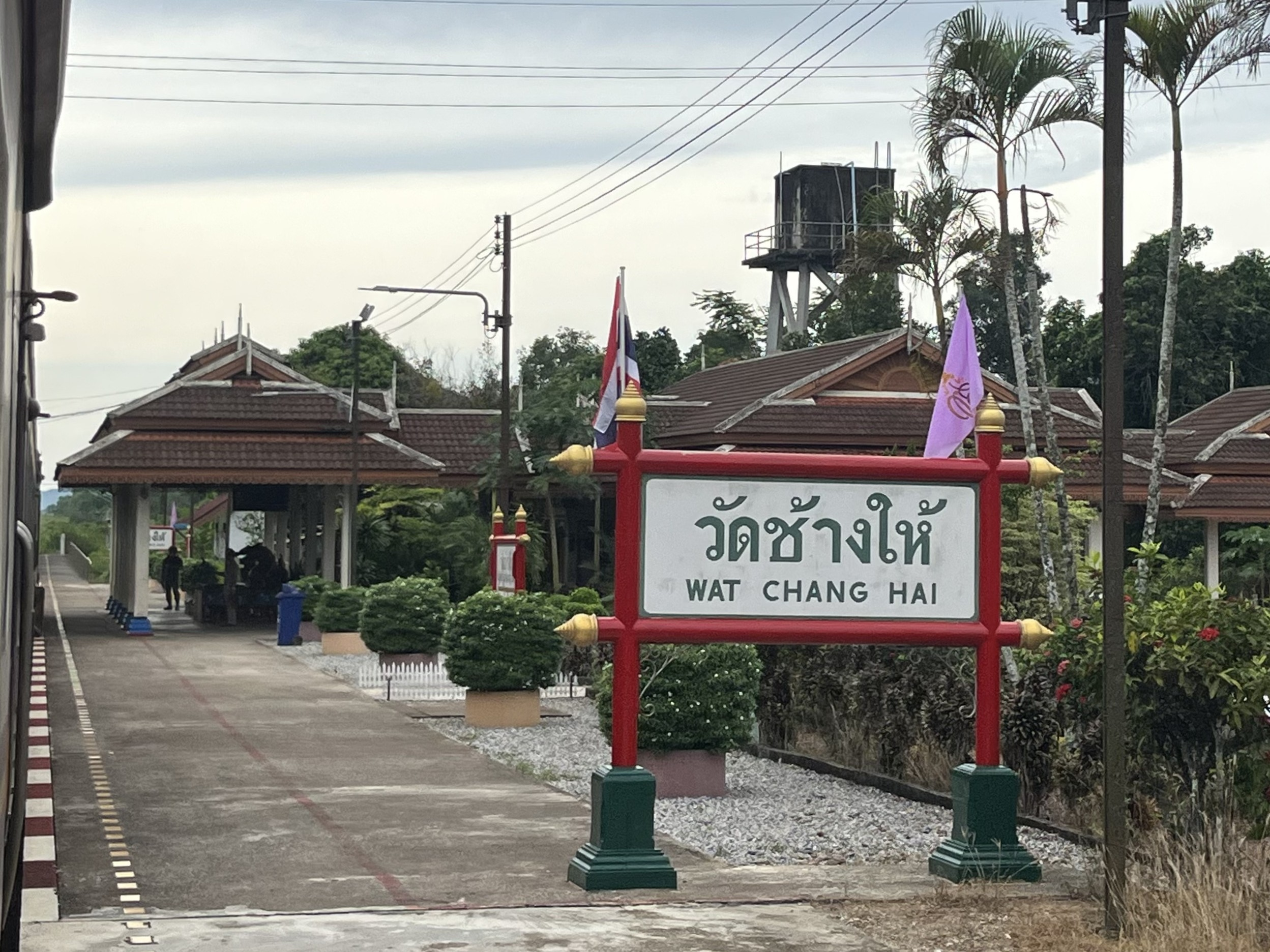

General information
- Location: Mu 2 (Ban Chang Hai), Khuan Nori Subdistrict, Khok Pho District, Pattani
- Coordinates: 6.6673°N 101.1704°E
- Owner: State Railway of Thailand
- Line: Southern Line
- Platforms: 1
- Tracks: 1

Other information
- Station code: ชห.

Services
Preceding station	State Railway of Thailand	Following station
Na Pradu towards Hua Lamphong or Krung Thep Aphiwat	Southern Line	Pa Rai Halt towards Su-ngai Kolok
Location

Wat Chang Hai railway station is a railway station located in Khuan Nori Subdistrict, Khok Pho District, Pattani. It is a class 3 railway station located 1,019.891 km (633.7 mi) from Thon Buri railway station. The station originally opened as a halt. Then, later upgraded to a station without passing loops.

== Services ==
- Rapid No. 171/172 Bangkok-Sungai Kolok-Bangkok
- Local No. 447/448 Surat Thani-Sungai Kolok-Surat Thani
- Local No. 451/452 Nakhon Si Thammarat-Sungai Kolok-Nakhon Si Thammarat
- Local No. 455/456 Nakhon Si Thammarat-Yala-Nakhon Si Thammarat
- Local No. 463/464 Phatthalung-Sungai Kolok-Phatthalung
