= Makrut =

Makrut may refer to:

- Makrut, a sub-district of Khok Pho district, Thailand
- Kaffir lime, a variety of citrus fruit
