= Pattani railway station =

Railway station in Khok Pho, Thailand

Coordinates: 6.7289°N 101.0944°E

Pattani ปัตตานี
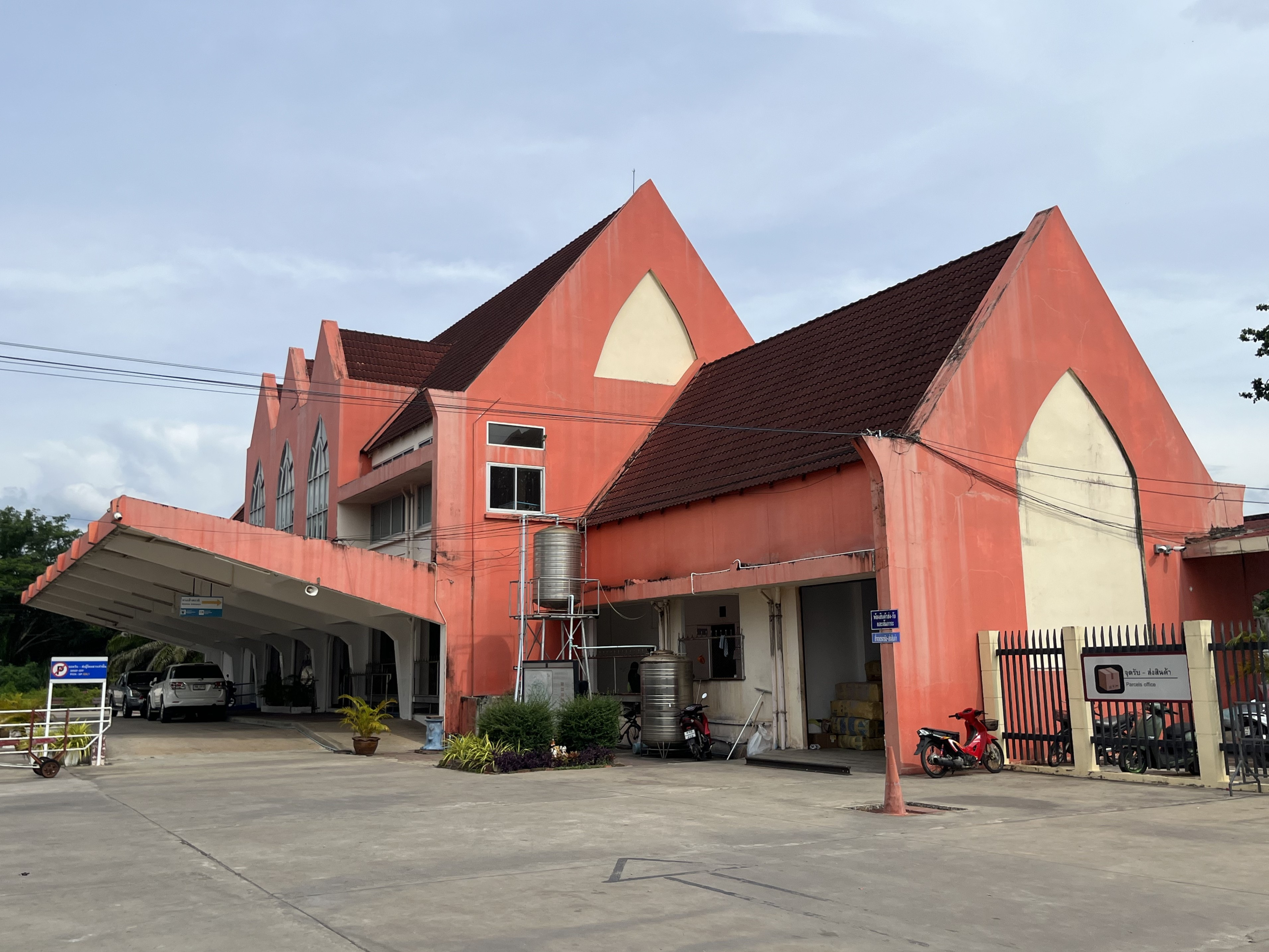

General information
- Location: Khok Pho Subdistrict, Khok Pho District, Pattani
- Owner: State Railway of Thailand
- Line: Southern Line
- Platforms: 2
- Tracks: 2

Other information
- Station code: นี.

History
- Opened: April 1917
- Former names: Khok Pho

Services
Preceding station	State Railway of Thailand	Following station
Ban Nikhom Halt towards Hua Lamphong or Krung Thep Aphiwat	Southern Line	Na Pradu towards Su-ngai Kolok
Location

Pattani railway station or Pattani (Khok Pho) railway station is a railway station located in Khok Pho Subdistrict, Khok Pho District, Pattani. It is a class 1 railway station located 1,009.209 km (627.1 mi) from Thon Buri Railway Station. The station opened in April 1917 as Khok Pho Station, as part of the Southern Line section between U Taphao Junction (Hat Yai)-Khlong Sai. The line extended further south, terminating at Su-ngai Kolok in September 1921, where it linked up with the Malaysian railway.

Pattani station's architecture is built as a mix of Thai and Malay architecture.

== Train services ==
- Thaksin Special Express train No. 37 / 38 Bangkok - Sungai Kolok - Bangkok
- Diesel Rail Special Express train No. 41 / 42 Bangkok - Yala - Bangkok
- Rapid train No. 169 / 170 Bangkok - Yala - Bangkok
- Rapid train No. 171 / 172 Bangkok - Sungai Kolok - Bangkok
- Rapid train No. 175 / 176 Hat Yai Junction - Sungai Kolok - Hat Yai Junction
- Local train No. 447 / 448 Surat Thani - Sungai Kolok - Surat Thani
- Local train No. 451 / 452 Nakhon Si Thammarat- Sungai Kolok- Nakhon Si Thammarat
- Local train No. 455 / 456 Nakhon Si Thammarat- Yala -Nakhon Si Thammarat
- Local train No. 463 / 464 Phatthalung-Sungai Kolok-Phatthalung
