= Decho Por.Borirak =

Thai Muay Thai fighter

- Born: Nattawut Nuliteh; February 15, 2003 (age 23); Mueang Songkhla district, Thailand
- Other names: Decholek Por Borirak (เดโชเล็ก ป.บริรักษ์); Decho Singmawynn (เดโชเล็ก สิงห์มาวิน)
- Height: 174 cm (5 ft 9 in)
- Weight: 130 lb (59 kg; 9 st 4 lb)
- Style: Muay Khao
- Stance: Orthodox
- Fighting out of: Bangkok, Thailand
- Team: Singha Mawynn
- Trainer: Kaolan Kaowichit; Tapaothong Singmawin

Nattawut Nuliteh (Thai: ณัฐวุฒิ หนูลิเต๊ะ) known professionally as Decho Por.Borirak (Thai: เดโช ป.บริรักษ์), is a Thai Muay Thai fighter. He is the reigning Channel 7 Stadium Super Featherweight champion.

== Career ==
On October 25, 2020, Decho faced Prabphipop Erawan at the channel 7 stadium. He lost the fight by decision.

On January 29, 2023, Decho faced Petchsansaeb SorJor.Tongprachin at the Channel 7 Stadium. He won the fight by decision.

On March 12, 2023 Decho faced Petchsamarn Sor.Samarngarment at the Channel 7 Stadium. He lost the fight by unanimous decision.

Decho faced Petchmorakot Sitnayoktaweepthapong on June 18, 2023, at the Channel 7 Stadium. He won the fight by decision.

On October 8, 2023, Decho faced Somraknoi PetchyindeeAcademy at the Channel 7 Stadium. He lost the fight by decision.

On December 3, 2023, Decho challenged Focus Adsanpatong for his Channel 7 Stadium Super Featherweight title. He won the fight by unanimous decision.

Decho made the first defense of his Channel 7 Stadium Super Featherweight title in a rematch against Focus Adsanpatong on March 24, 2024. He won the fight by majority decision.

On June 9, 2024, Decho rematched Petchwichai Dechadecha at the Channel 7 Stadium. He won the fight by unanimous decision.

On October 12, 2024, Decho faced Neo Drew Klemer at Rajadamnern World Series. He won the fight by unanimous decision.

As of December 2024 Decho was ranked te #2 muay thai fighter in the world in the 130lbs division by the WMO. As of January he was the #1 ranked 130lbs muay thai fighter in the world according to WBC Muay Thai.

Decho made his ONE Championship debut on April 11, 2025, at ONE Friday Fights 104 against Isannuea Ranongmuaythai. He won the fight by split decision.

== Titles and accomplishments ==
- Channel 7 Stadium
  - 2023 Channel 7 Stadium Super Featherweight (130 lbs) Champion
    - One successful title defense

== Fight record ==
Muay Thai Record
Date	Result	Opponent	Event	Location	Method	Round	Time
2026-09-11		(Thailand) Pompet Panthonggym	ONE Friday Fights 170, Lumpinee Stadium	Bangkok, Thailand			
2026-05-22	Loss	(Russia) Rustam Yunusov	ONE Friday Fights 155, Lumpinee Stadium	Bangkok, Thailand	Decision (Unanimous)	3	3:00
2026-03-20	Win	(Georgia (country)) Elvin Kazimov	ONE Friday Fights 147, Lumpinee Stadium	Bangkok, Thailand	KO (Elbow)	1	1:14
2026-01-16	Win	(Thailand) Pompet Panthonggym	ONE Friday Fights 138, Lumpinee Stadium	Bangkok, Thailand	Decision (Unanimous)	3	3:00
2025-10-31	Win	(Thailand) Suriyanlek Por.Yenying	ONE Friday Fights 131, Lumpinee Stadium	Bangkok, Thailand	Decision (Unanimous)	3	3:00
2025-09-12	Loss	(Thailand) Suriyanlek Por.Yenying	ONE Friday Fights 124, Lumpinee Stadium	Bangkok, Thailand	Decision (Unanimous)	3	3:00
2025-06-20	Win	(Thailand) Isannuea Ranongmuaythai	ONE Friday Fights 113, Lumpinee Stadium	Bangkok, Thailand	Decision (Unanimous)	3	3:00
2025-04-11	Win	(Thailand) Isannuea Ranongmuaythai	ONE Friday Fights 104, Lumpinee Stadium	Bangkok, Thailand	Decision (Split)	3	3:00
2024-12-26	Win	(Thailand) Kompatak SinbiMuayThai	Petchyindee + Pryde TV, Rajadamnern Stadium	Bangkok, Thailand	Decision	5	3:00
2024-10-12	Win	(Scotland) Neo Drew Klemer	Rajadamnern World Series	Bangkok, Thailand	Decision (Unanimous)	3	3:00
2024-08-17	Win	(Thailand) Comeback TK.Yuttana	Kiatpetch SKS, Omnoi Stadium	Samut Sakhon, Thailand	Decision	5	3:00
2024-06-09	Win	(Thailand) Petchwichai Dechadecha	Channel 7 Stadium	Bangkok, Thailand	Decision	5	3:00
2024-03-24	Win	(Thailand) Focus Adsanpatong	Channel 7 Stadium	Bangkok, Thailand	Decision	5	3:00
Defends the Channel 7 Stadium Super Featherweight (130 lbs) title.
2024-02-11	Draw	(Thailand) Petchwichai Dechadecha	TKO Kiatpetch, Rajadamnern Stadium	Bangkok, Thailand	Decision	5	3:00
2023-12-03	Win	(Thailand) Focus Adsanpatong	Channel 7 Stadium	Bangkok, Thailand	Decision	5	3:00
Wins the Channel 7 Stadium Super Featherweight (130 lbs) title.
2023-10-08	Loss	(Thailand) Somraknoi PetchyindeeAcademy	Channel 7 Stadium	Bangkok, Thailand	Decision	5	3:00
2023-08-09	Win	(Thailand) Kamchai Por.Lakboon	Palangmai, Rajadamnern Stadium	Bangkok, Thailand	TKO	4	
2023-06-18	Win	(Thailand) Petchmorakot Sitnayoktaweepthapong	Channel 7 Stadium	Bangkok, Thailand	Decision	5	3:00
2023-05-09	Win	(Thailand) Pornsanae Sor.Phumipat		Nakhon Si Thammarat, Thailand	Decision	5	3:00
2023-03-12	Loss	(Thailand) Petchsamarn Sor.Samarngarment	Channel 7 Stadium	Bangkok, Thailand	Decision	5	3:00
2023-01-29	Win	(Thailand) Petchsansaeb SorJor.Tongprachin	Channel 7 Stadium	Bangkok, Thailand	Decision	5	3:00
2022-12-04	Loss	(Thailand) Boonchana Nayokathasala	Chang Muay Thai Kiatpetch, Rajadamnern Stadium	Bangkok, Thailand	Decision	5	3:00
2022-09-25	Win	(Thailand) Thianchai Ekmuangnon	Chang Muay Thai Kiatpetch, Rajadamnern Stadium	Bangkok, Thailand	Decision	5	3:00
2022-08-01	Win	(Thailand) Petchrapha Sor.Sopit	Palangmai, Thupatemi Stadium	Pathum Thani, Thailand	Decision	5	3:00
2022-06-19	Win	(Thailand) Singhalek Sor.Chokmeechai	Kiatpetch, Rajadamnern Stadium	Bangkok, Thailand	Decision	5	3:00
2022-05-02	Win	(Thailand) Wanmeechok Sitnayokthaweeptaphong	Singmawyn, Rajadamnern Stadium	Bangkok, Thailand	Decision	5	3:00
2022-03-20	Loss	(Thailand) Sanwo UFAboomdeksian	Channel 7 Stadium	Bangkok, Thailand	Decision	5	3:00
2021-12-23	Loss	(Thailand) Chartpayak Saksatun	Kiatpetch	Thailand	Decision	5	3:00
2021-11-07	Win	(Thailand) Petchkitti Sor.Jaruwan	Phetchbuncha Stadium	Ko Samui, Thailand	KO	4	
2021-09-28	Win	(Thailand) Sanwo UFAboomdeksian	Kiatpetch, Omnoi Stadium	Samut Sakhon, Thailand	Decision	5	3:00
2021-04-04	Loss	(Thailand) Sanwo UFAboomdeksian	Channel 7 Stadium	Bangkok, Thailand	Decision	5	3:00
2020-11-15	Loss	(Thailand) Chalamsua Nayokathasala	Channel 7 Stadium	Bangkok, Thailand	Decision	5	3:00
2020-10-25	Loss	(Thailand) Prabphipop Erawan	Channel 7 Stadium	Bangkok, Thailand	Decision	5	3:00
2020-09-20	Win	(Thailand) Mungkornyok TNmuaythai	Channel 7 Stadium	Bangkok, Thailand	Decision	5	3:00
2020-08-16	Win	(Thailand) Petchmuangtrang Sor.Pong-amorn	Channel 7 Stadium	Bangkok, Thailand	Decision	5	3:00
2020-07-19	Loss	(Thailand) Mungkornyok TNmuaythai	Channel 7 Stadium	Bangkok, Thailand	Decision	5	3:00
Legend: Win Loss Draw/No contest Notes
