= Museum of Islamic Cultural Heritage and Al-Quran Learning Center =

Coordinates: 6.4032°N 101.7378°E

- พิพิธภัณฑ์มรดกวัฒนธรรมอิสลาม
- Established: 2010
- Location: Yi-ngo District, Narathiwat Province, Thailand
- Type: History museum
- Curator: Ustaz Muhammad Lutfi Ahmad Samae

The Museum of Islamic Cultural Heritage and Al-Quran Learning Center (Thai: พิพิธภัณฑ์มรดกวัฒนธรรมอิสลาม; Malay: Muzium al-Quran Melayu Raya) is a museum in Yi-ngo district, Narathiwat province, Thailand. The museum focuses on Malay history, including manuscripts and artifacts from the Malay Peninsula.

== History ==
The museum opened in 2010, and features exhibition rooms displaying Quran manuscripts, Malay manuscripts, and ancient Malay technology. The museum's collections include 79 handwritten copies of the Quran.

In 2023, Prime Minister Srettha Thavisin toured the museum. The museum opened to the public in 2024.
