= Na Pradu railway station =

Railway station in Na Pradu, Thailand

Na Pradu นาประดู่
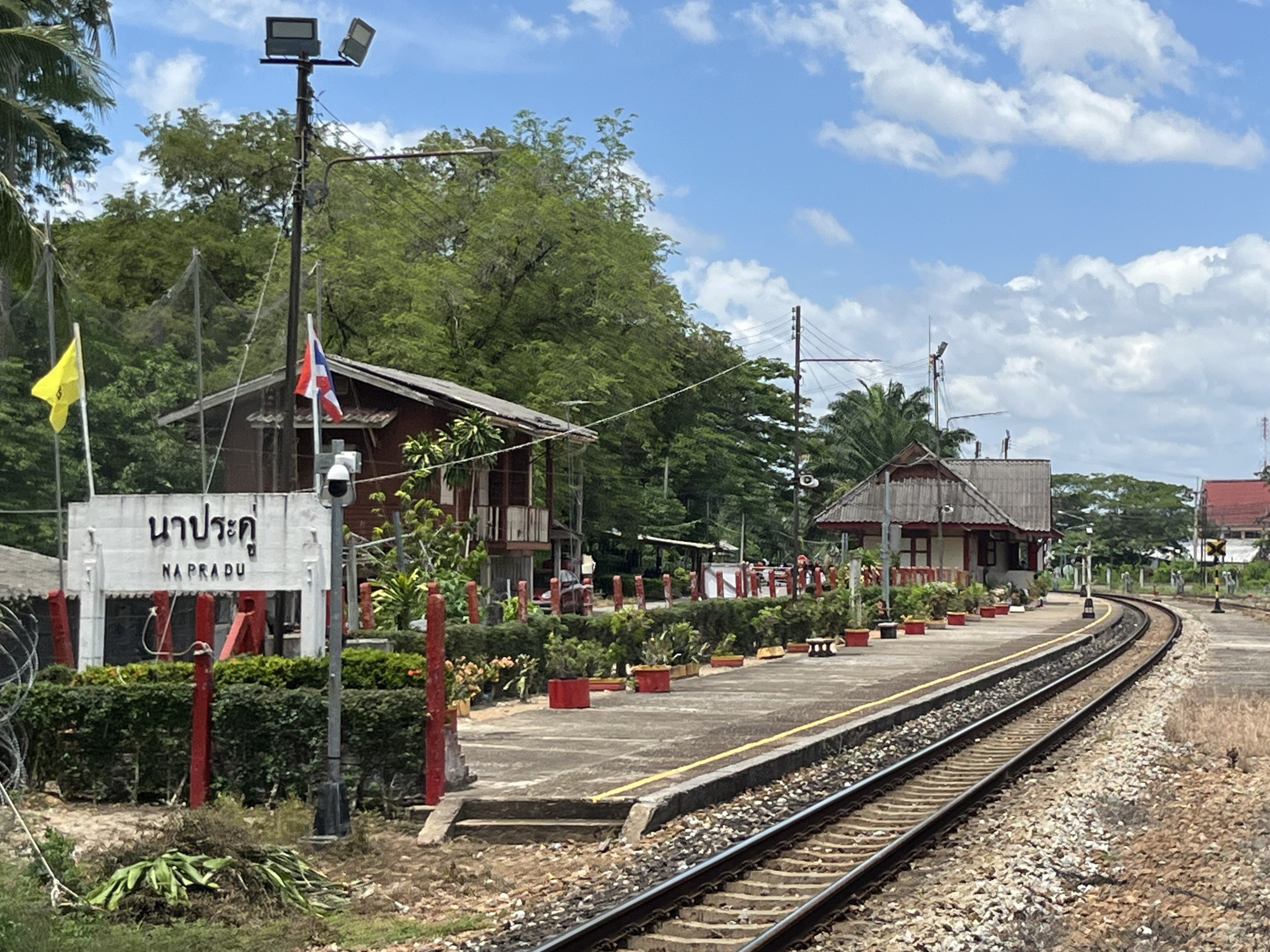

General information
- Location: National Highway No. 409, Na Pradu Subdistrict, Khok Pho District, Pattani
- Owner: State Railway of Thailand
- Line: Southern Line
- Platforms: 2
- Tracks: 3

Other information
- Station code: าด.

Services
Preceding station	State Railway of Thailand	Following station
Pattani (Khok Pho) towards Hua Lamphong or Krung Thep Aphiwat	Southern Line	Wat Chang Hai towards Su-ngai Kolok
Location

Na Pradu railway station is a railway station located in Na Pradu Subdistrict, Khok Pho District, Pattani. It is a class 3 railway station located 1,016.729 km (631.8 mi) from Thon Buri railway station.

== Services ==
- Rapid No. 169/170 Bangkok-Yala-Bangkok
- Rapid No. 171/172 Bangkok-Sungai Kolok-Bangkok
- Local No. 447/448 Surat Thani-Sungai Kolok-Surat Thani
- Local No. 451/452 Nakhon Si Thammarat-Sungai Kolok-Nakhon Si Thammarat
- Local No. 455/456 Nakhon Si Thammarat-Yala-Nakhon Si Thammarat
- Local No. 463/464 Phatthalung-Sungai Kolok-Phatthalung
