= Ko Yo =

Island in Songkhla province, Thailand

Coordinates: 7.160833°N 100.544722°E

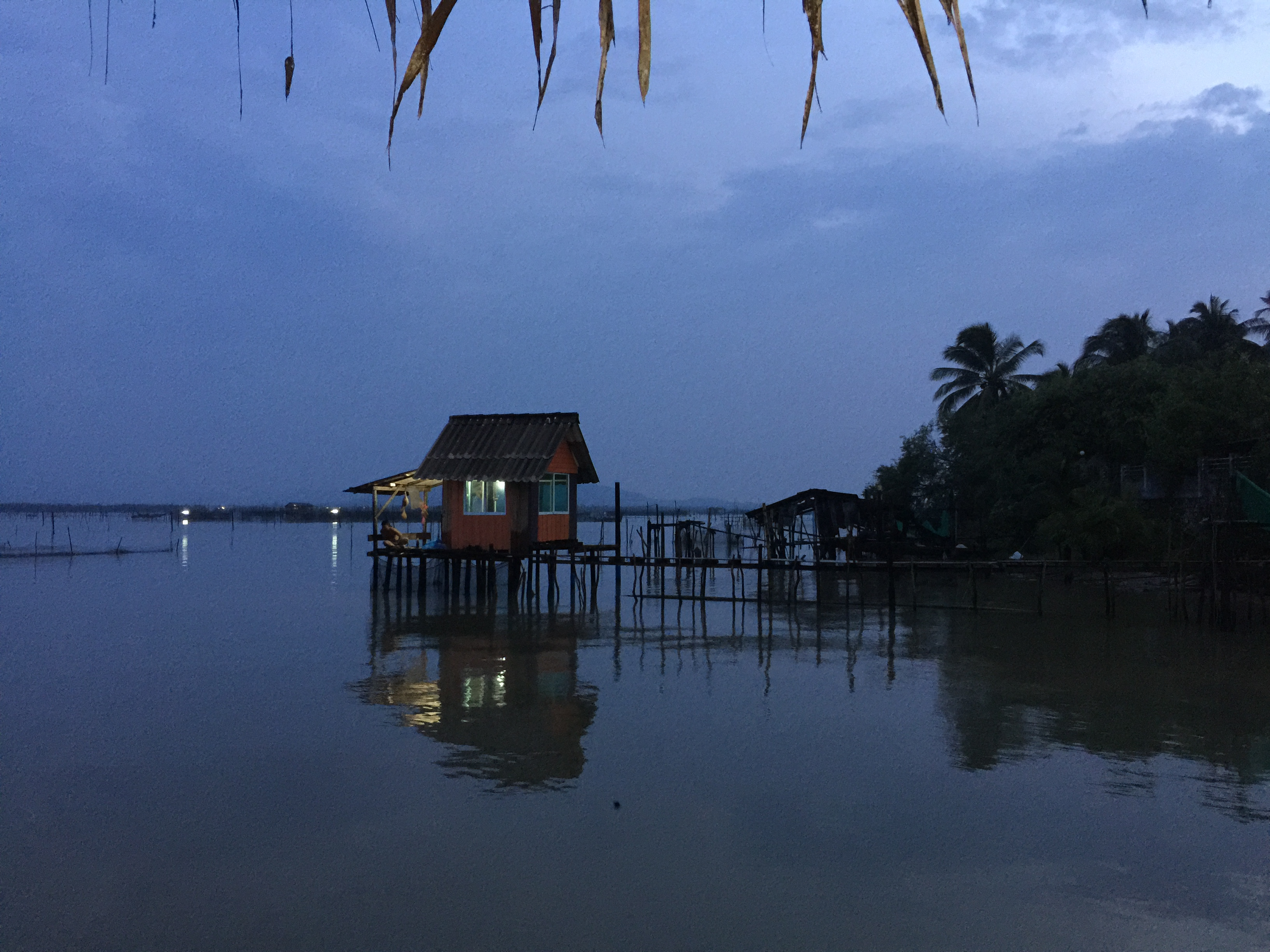
Somewhere in Ko Yo

Ko Yo (Thai: เกาะยอ, pronounced [kɔ̀ʔ jɔ̄ː]) is an island, located in the Songkhla lake in the area of Mueang Songkhla District, Songkhla Province in southern Thailand.

== Geography ==
Ko Yo is a small island in the middle of southern Songkhla lake, a part of Songkhla Province. Covering an area of 3,710 acres (1,500 ha), most of the area is mountains and hills, 10-151 meters high, with the northernmost part of the island being "Khao Bo" or "Khao Khae". From Khao Bo is connected to the south called "Khao Kuti", the highest point of the area about 151 meters.

Neighbouring places are (from north clockwise): Singhanakhon District, Mueang Songkhla District, Mueang Songkhla District, and Hat Yai District, all of them are in Songkhla Province.

== Administration ==
Ko Yo has the status of a tambon (sub-district) in Mueang Songkhla District.

Ko Yo is administered by the Subdistrict Administrative Organization (SAO) Ko Yo (องค์การบริหารส่วนตำบลเกาะยอ).

It also consists of nine mubans (village).

== Transportation ==
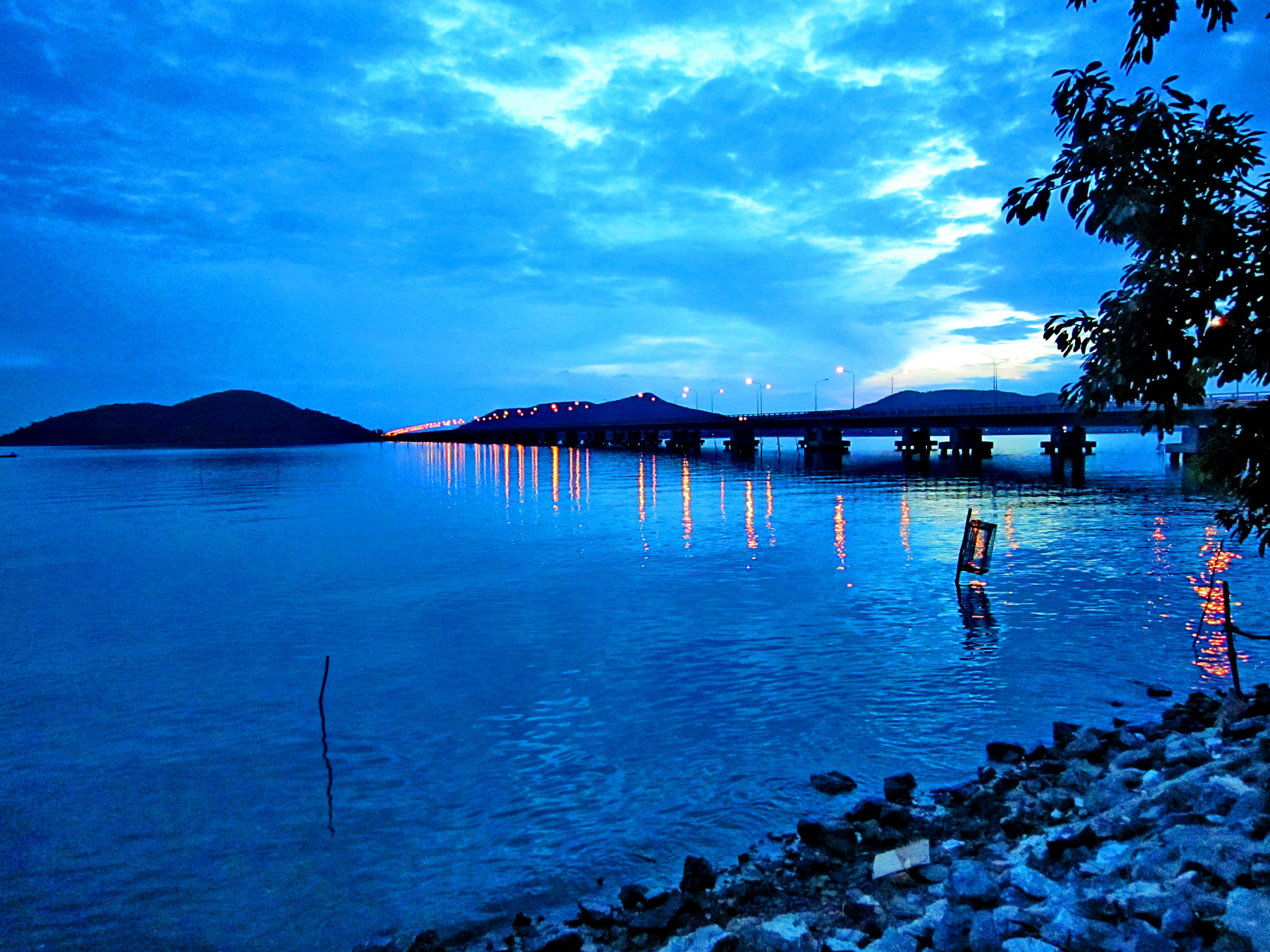
Tinsulanonda Bridge

Ko Yo is approximately 20 kilometers southwest of Mueang Songkhla District Office by land and 6 kilometers by water. The island connected to the mainland by Tinsulanonda Bridge, which is divided into two phases.

== Demography ==
Most of the local population is of Thai-Chinese people who work in fishing and cultivation.

== Tourism ==
Ko Yo that has recently become one of important tourist attractions in province of Songkhla. It is famous for its cotton-weaving industry called "Ko Yo Woven Cloth". Parapocryptes serperaster, a species of goby can be found locally and is cooked as a local delicacy.

== Local products ==
- Ko Yo Woven Cloth
- Chempedak
- Crispy Barramundi Skin
