= Na Mom district =

Na Mom นาหม่อม
- Amphoe
- Amphoe location in Songkhla province
- Coordinates: 6°57′30″N 100°33′25″E
- Country: Thailand
- Province: Songkhla
- Seat: Na Mom

Area
  - Total: 92.47 km^{2} (35.70 sq mi)

Population (2005)
  - Total: 20,950
  - Density: 226.6/km^{2} (587/sq mi)
- Time zone: UTC+7 (ICT)
- Postal code: 90310
- Geocode: 9012

Na Mom (Thai: นาหม่อม, pronounced [nāː mɔ̀m]) is a district (amphoe) of Songkhla province, southern Thailand.

== History ==
The district was initially the tambon Thung Phra Khian (ทุ่งพระเคียน) of Hat Yai district, which was changed into tambon Na Mom in 1943. On 30 April 1981 it was made the minor district (king amphoe) Na Mom, together with three further tambon from Hat Yai District. It was upgraded to a full district on 4 July 1994.

== Geography ==
Neighboring districts are (from the north clockwise) Mueang Songkhla, Chana, and Hat Yai.

== Administration ==
The district is divided into four sub-districts (tambon), which are further subdivided into 29 villages (muban). There are no municipal (thesaban) areas within the district, and a further four tambon administrative organizations (TAO).

No.	Name	Thai name	Villages	Pop.
1.	Na Mom	นาหม่อม	10	7,537
2.	Phichit	พิจิตร	6	4,343
3.	Thung Khamin	ทุ่งขมิ้น	7	4,986
4.	Khlong Rang	คลองหรัง	6	4,084
