= Mueang Songkhla district =

Mueang Songkhla เมืองสงขลา
- District
- District location in Songkhla province
- Coordinates: 7°12′25″N 100°35′47″E
- Country: Thailand
- Province: Songkhla
- Seat: Bo Yang
- Subdistricts: 6
- Mubans: 47

Area
  - Total: 171.9 km^{2} (66.4 sq mi)

Population (2014)
  - Total: 163,329
  - Density: 948.7/km^{2} (2,457/sq mi)
- Time zone: UTC+7 (ICT)
- Postal code: 90000
- Geocode: 9001

Mueang Songkhla or Songkhla City (Thai: เมืองสงขลา, pronounced [mɯ̄a̯ŋ sǒŋ.kʰlǎː]; Pattani Malay: ซิงกอรอ, pronounced [sīŋ.kɔː.rɔː]) is the capital district (amphoe mueang) of Songkhla province, southern Thailand.

== Geography ==
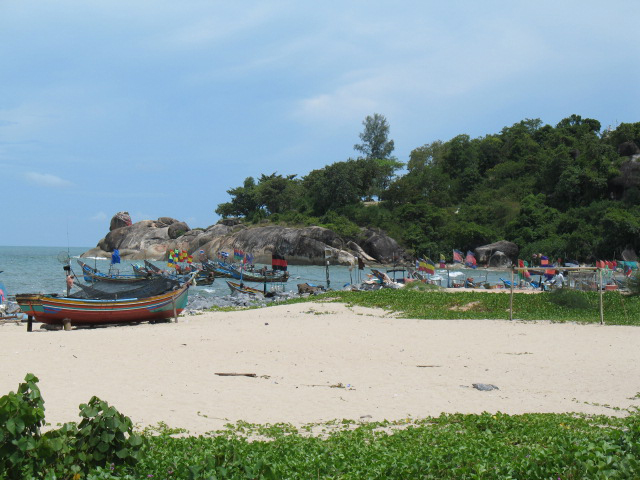
Village, Tambon Bo Yang

Neighboring districts are (from the south clockwise): Chana, Na Mom, Hat Yai, and Singhanakhon of Songkhla Province. To the east is the Gulf of Thailand.

In the northern part of the district is Songkhla Lake.

== History ==
The name Songkhla is a Thai corruption of Singgora, its original name, which means 'the city of lions' in Malay. It refers to a lion-shaped mountain near the city of Songkhla.

== Demographics ==
The majority of the population of Mueang Songkhla is Thai with a significant number of Thai Malays. The main language spoken in this area is Southern and Central Thai dialect with local varieties of Songkhla Malay. Buddhism is the majority religion here with a sizable amount of Islam embraced by Thai Malays and a mixed ethnicity called Samsam.

== Administration ==
=== Central administration ===
Mueang Songkhla district is divided into six sub-districts (tambons), which are further subdivided into 47 administrative villages (mubans).

No.	Name	Thai	Villages	Pop.
1.	Boyang	บ่อยาง	-	67,154
2.	Khao Rup Chang (Bukit Gambar Gajah)	เขารูปช้าง	10	39,231
3	Koh Taeo	เกาะแต้ว	10	11,121
4	Phawong	พะวง	8	30,541
5	Thung Wang (Padang Harapan)	ทุ่งหวัง	10	10,396
6	Koh Yo (Pulau Ayoitu)	เกาะยอ	9	b4,886

=== Local administration ===
There is one city (thesaban nakhon) in the district:

- Songkhla (Thai: เทศบาลนครสงขลา) consisting of sub-district Bo Yang.

There is one town (thesaban mueang) in the district:

- Khao Rup Chang (Thai: เทศบาลเมืองเขารูปช้าง) consisting of sub-district Khao Rup Chang.

There are two sub-district municipalities (thesaban tambons) in the district:

- Phawong (Thai: เทศบาลตำบลพะวง) consisting of sub-district Phawong.
- Ko Taeo (Thai: เทศบาลตำบลเกาะแต้ว) consisting of sub-district Ko Taeo.

There are two sub-district administrative organizations (SAO) in the district:

- Thung Wang (Thai: องค์การบริหารส่วนตำบลทุ่งหวัง) consisting of sub-district Thung Wang.
- Ko Yo (Thai: องค์การบริหารส่วนตำบลเกาะยอ) consisting of sub-district Ko Yo.
