= Na Thawi district =

Na Thawi นาทวี
- District
- District location in Songkhla province
- Coordinates: 6°44′30″N 100°41′31″E
- Country: Thailand
- Province: Songkhla

Area
  - Total: 747.0 km^{2} (288.4 sq mi)

Population (2022)
  - Total: 69,407
  - Density: 78.5/km^{2} (203/sq mi)
- Time zone: UTC+7 (ICT)
- Postal code: 90160
- Geocode: 9004

Na Thawi (Thai: นาทวี, pronounced [nāː tʰā.wīː]; Pattani Malay: นาวี, pronounced [nāːwīː]) is a district (amphoe) in the southern part of Songkhla province, southern Thailand.

== History ==
NaThawi District was originally the location of Chana District, Songkhla Province. The brief history is that Chana District was previously called Mueang Chana. The city was located in Tambon Chanong, Chana District. Later, Chana City was moved to Tambon Na Thawi, to the east of the Na Thawi District Office. At that time, Chana City was a third-class city with Khun Si Sanphakham (Mr. Son) as its governor. Later, during the reign of King Rama V, King Chulalongkorn graciously ordered the current Chana City to be moved because at that time, transportation in Tambon Na Thawi was inconvenient.

When the Local Administration Act B.E. 2475 was announced, Chana City was changed to "Chana District" and the status of Tambon Na Thawi, which was the location of Chana City, was raised to include nearby sub-districts as "Na Thawi Minor District" under Chana District and later announced as a district.

On June 1, 1947, Chang Sub-district was established, separated from Na Thawi Sub-district. Khlong Sai Sub-district was established, separated from Na Mo Si Sub-district. Tha Pradu Sub-district was established. Separated from Tambon Plak Nu, established Tambon Saton, separated from Tambon Thap Chang

June 6, 1956, elevated from Nathawi Subdistrict, Chana District to Na Thawi District

September 24, 1956, established Na Thawi Sanitary District in some areas of Tambon Na Thawi

May 24, 1977, transferred the area of Village No. 7 (at that time) of Tambon Prakop to be Village No. 9 of Tambon Saton

July 1, 1980, established Khlong Kwang Subdistrict, separated from Tambon Plak Nu

June 18, 1992, changed the Na Thawi Sanitary District area for the appropriateness of local administration and maintenance

May 25, 1999, elevated from Na Thawi Sanitary District to Na Thawi Subdistrict Municipality

== Geography ==
Neighboring districts are (from the west clockwise): Sadao, Hat Yai, Chana, Thepha, and Saba Yoi. To the south is the state of Kedah, Malaysia.

== Administration ==
The district is divided into 10 sub-districts (tambons), which are further subdivided into 92 villages (mubans). The township (thesaban tambon) Na Thawi covers parts of tambon Na Thawi. There are a further 10 tambon administrative organizations (TAO).

| No. | Name | Thai name | Villages | Pop. |
|---|---|---|---|---|
| 1. | Na Thawi | นาทวี | 17 | 16,678 |
| 2. | Chang | ฉาง | 9 | 5,033 |
| 3. | Na Mosi | นาหมอศรี | 8 | 3,115 |
| 4. | Khlong Sai | คลองทราย | 8 | 6,055 |
| 5. | Plak Nu | ปลักหนู | 7 | 5,098 |
| 6. | Tha Pradu | ท่าประดู่ | 9 | 5,923 |
| 7. | Sathon | สะท้อน | 10 | 7,682 |
| 8. | Thap Chang | ทับช้าง | 10 | 7,115 |
| 9. | Prakop | ประกอบ | 7 | 7,036 |
| 10. | Khlong Kwang | คลองกวาง | 7 | 5,645 |
