= Yi-ngo district =

Yi-ngo ยี่งอ
- District
- District location in Narathiwat province
- Coordinates: 6°24′11″N 101°42′22″E
- Country: Thailand
- Province: Narathiwat
- Seat: Yi-ngo

Area
  - Total: 200.516 km^{2} (77.420 sq mi)

Population (2014)
  - Total: 44,817
  - Density: 202.9/km^{2} (526/sq mi)
- Time zone: UTC+7 (ICT)
- Postal code: 96180
- Geocode: 9604

Yi-ngo (Thai: ยี่งอ, pronounced [jîː.ŋɔ̄ː]; Pattani Malay: ยือรีงา, pronounced [jɯː.riː.ŋāː]) is a district (amphoe) of Narathiwat province, southern Thailand.

== Geography ==
Neighboring districts are (from the north clockwise): Bacho, Mueang Narathiwat, Ra-ngae, and Rueso.

== History ==
Yi-ngo was originally a district in Sai Buri Province. In 1909 it was reassigned to Bang Nara Province, present-day Narathiwat Province.

== Administration ==
=== Central administration ===
Yi-ngo district is divided into six sub-districts (tambons), which are further subdivided into 40 administrative villages (mubans).

No.	Name	Thai	Villages	Pop.
1.	Yi-ngo	ยี่งอ	7	9,760
2.	Lahan	ละหาร	8	8,088
3.	Cho Bo	จอเบาะ	9	8,402
4.	Lubo Baya	ลุโบะบายะ	5	4,537
5.	Lubo Buesa	ลุโบะบือซา	6	4,951
6.	Tapoyo	ตะปอเยาะ	5	9,079

=== Local administration ===
There is one sub-district municipality (thesaban tambon) in the district:

- Yi-ngo (Thai: เทศบาลตำบลยี่งอ) consisting of parts of sub-district Yi-ngo.

There are six subdistrict administrative organizations (SAO) in the district:

- Yi-ngo (Thai: องค์การบริหารส่วนตำบลยี่งอ) consisting of parts of sub-district Yi-ngo.
- Lahan (Thai: องค์การบริหารส่วนตำบลละหาร) consisting of sub-district Lahan.
- Cho Bo (Thai: องค์การบริหารส่วนตำบลจอเบาะ) consisting of sub-district Cho Bo.
- Lubo Baya (Thai: องค์การบริหารส่วนตำบลลุโบะบายะ) consisting of sub-district Lubo Baya.
- Lubo Buesa (Thai: องค์การบริหารส่วนตำบลลุโบะบือซา) consisting of sub-district Lubo Buesa.
- Tapoyo (Thai: องค์การบริหารส่วนตำบลตะปอเยาะ) consisting of sub-district Tapoyo.
