= Chana district =

Chana จะนะ
- District
- District location in Songkhla province
- Coordinates: 6°54′51″N 100°44′26″E
- Country: Thailand
- Province: Songkhla
- Seat: Ban Na
- Subdistricts: 14
- Mubans: 139

Area
  - Total: 502.98 km^{2} (194.20 sq mi)

Population (2014)
  - Total: 104,162
  - Density: 193/km^{2} (500/sq mi)
- Time zone: UTC+7 (ICT)
- Postal code: 90130
- Geocode: 9003

Chana (Thai: จะนะ, pronounced [t͡ɕā.náʔ]; Pattani Malay: จือเนาะ, pronounced [t͡ɕɯː.nɔʔ]) is a district (amphoe) in the southeastern part of Songkhla province, southern Thailand.

== Geography ==
Neighboring districts are (from the east clockwise): Thepha, Na Thawi, Hat Yai, Na Mom, and Mueang Songkhla of Songkhla Province. To the northeast is the Gulf of Thailand.

== History ==
Originally, Chana together with Palian, Thepha and Songkhla was one of four mueangs subordinate to Mueang Phatthalung. When Songkhla was split off from Phatthalung and made a direct subordinate of Bangkok, Chana was then placed under Songkhla.

The location of the town was moved several times, so when it was made a district in the thesaphiban administrative reforms at the beginning of the 20th century, the district office was in present-day Na Thawi. The location turned out to be inconvenient, so it was moved to Ban Na. In 1917 the district was renamed to Ban Na after the central tambon. In 1924 the name was changed back to Chana by the government to avoid confusion with the district Ban Na in Surat Thani Province and Ban Na in Nakhon Nayok Province.

== Etymology ==
The name Chana is a Thai corruption of chenok, its original name in Malay.

== Economy ==
On 7 May 2019, the Prayut Chan-o-cha-led government approved an 18.7 billion baht "Southern Economic Corridor", also known as the "Southern Economic Zone", centered on Chana District. The scheme envisions transforming 16,753 rai of agricultural land into industrial zones: a deep-sea port; light industry (4,253 rai); heavy industry (4,000 rai); four 3,700 megawatt power plants (4,000 rai); import/export infrastructure (2,000 rai); logistical infrastructure (2,000 rai); and recreational areas and accommodations (500 rai). The government claims the project will provide jobs for more than 100,000 people. Local people, noting the environmental issues created by the Eastern Economic Corridor, are mobilising to stop the project.

A parallel effort, also (confusingly) called the "Southern Economic Corridor", but not involving Songkhla Province, aims at development of high-speed rail linking Bangkok to Surat Thani province, a double-track rail link from Chumphon to Ranong, a deep-sea Ranong port, and a "Royal Coast" tourism cluster, involving Phetchaburi, Prachuap Khiri Khan, Chumphon, and Ranong provinces.

== Administration ==
=== Central administration ===
Chana is divided into 14 sub-districts (tambons), which are further subdivided into 139 administrative villages (mubans).

No.	Name	Thai	Malay	Villages	Pop.
1.	Ban Na	บ้านนา	Kampung Bendang	10	16,150
2.	Paching	ป่าชิง	Hutan Chengal	9	4,911
3.	Saphan Mai Kaen	สะพานไม้แก่น	Jambatan Kayu Kera	8	6,598
4.	Sakom	สะกอม	Pantai Sakom	9	8,362
5.	Nawa	นาหว้า	Bendang Wangi	12	7,655
6.	Na Thap	นาทับ	Bendang Taboh	14	12,977
7.	Nam Khao	น้ำขาว	Air Putih	11	3,872
8.	Khun Tat Wai	ขุนตัดหวาย	Potong Rotan	9	3,097
9.	Tha Mosai	ท่าหมอไทร	Tembusai	11	6,620
10.	Chanong	จะโหนง	Cenong	11	7,661
11.	Khu	คู	Parit	9	6,411
12.	Khae	แค	Pokok Ara	7	4,323
13.	Khlong Pia	คลองเปียะ	Terusan Pia	11	5,478
14.	Taling Chan	ตลิ่งชัน	Tebing Cempaka	8	10,047

=== Local administration ===
There are three sub-district municipalities (thesaban tambons) in the district:

- Chana (Thai: เทศบาลตำบลจะนะ) consisting of parts of sub-district Ban Na.
- Ban Na (Thai: เทศบาลตำบลบ้านนา) consisting of parts of sub-district Ban Na.
- Na Thap (Thai: เทศบาลตำบลนาทับ) consisting of sub-district Na Thap.

There are 12 sub-district administrative organizations (SAO) in the district:

- Pa Ching (Thai: องค์การบริหารส่วนตำบลป่าชิง) consisting of sub-district Pa Ching.
- Saphan Mai Kaen (Thai: องค์การบริหารส่วนตำบลสะพานไม้แก่น) consisting of sub-district Saphan Mai Kaen.
- Sakom (Thai: องค์การบริหารส่วนตำบลสะกอม) consisting of sub-district Sakom.
- Na Wa (Thai: องค์การบริหารส่วนตำบลนาหว้า) consisting of sub-district Na Wa.
- Nam Khao (Thai: องค์การบริหารส่วนตำบลน้ำขาว) consisting of sub-district Nam Khao.
- Khun Tat Wai (Thai: องค์การบริหารส่วนตำบลขุนตัดหวาย) consisting of sub-district Khun Tat Wai.
- Tha Mo Sai (Thai: องค์การบริหารส่วนตำบลท่าหมอไทร) consisting of sub-district Tha Mo Sai.
- Chanong (Thai: องค์การบริหารส่วนตำบลจะโหนง) consisting of sub-district Chanong.
- Khu (Thai: องค์การบริหารส่วนตำบลคู) consisting of sub-district Khu.
- Khae (Thai: องค์การบริหารส่วนตำบลแค) consisting of sub-district Khae.
- Khlong Pia (Thai: องค์การบริหารส่วนตำบลคลองเปียะ) consisting of sub-district Khlong Pia.
- Taling Chan (Thai: องค์การบริหารส่วนตำบลตลิ่งชัน) consisting of sub-district Taling Chan.
