= Mueang Pattani district =

Mueang Pattani เมืองปัตตานี
- District
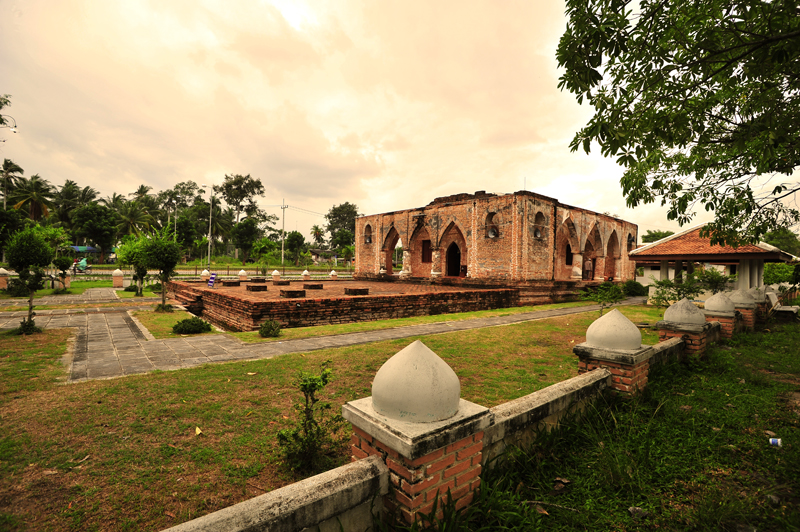
- Krue Se Mosque in Tambon Tanyong Lulo

- District location in Pattani province
- Coordinates: 6°52′7″N 101°15′0″E
- Country: Thailand
- Province: Pattani
- Tambon: 13
- Muban: 66

Area
  - Total: 96.869 km^{2} (37.401 sq mi)

Population (6 November 2002)
  - Total: 127,531
  - Density: 1,221.3/km^{2} (3,163/sq mi)
- Time zone: UTC+7 (ICT)
- Postal code: 94000
- Geocode: 9401

Mueang Pattani (Thai: เมืองปัตตานี, pronounced [mɯ̄a̯ŋ pàt.tāː.nīː]) is the capital district (amphoe mueang) of Pattani province, southern Thailand.

== History ==
This area was the center of the Pattani Kingdom. In the reign of King Rama II, the king ordered the kingdom divided into seven cities (mueang): Pattani, Yaha, Yaring, Nong Chik, Ra-ngae, Raman, and Sai Buri. It was made a district in 1901. Pattani was the central district of Monthon Pattani when King Rama V created the monthon in 1906.

In 1917 the district was renamed Sabarang, the name of the central sub-district. In 1938 the name was changed back to Mueang Pattani.

== Geography ==
Neighboring districts are (from the east clockwise): Yaring, Yarang, and Nong Chik. To the north is the Gulf of Thailand.

The important water resource is the Tani River.

== Administration ==
=== Central administration ===
Mueang Pattani is divided into 13 sub-districts (tambons), which are further subdivided into 66 administrative villages (mubans).

No.	Name	Thai	Villages	Pop.
1.	Sabarang	สะบารัง	-	25,438
2.	Anoru	อาเนาะรู	-	10,766
3.	Chabang Tiko	จะบังติกอ	-	8,030
4.	Bana	บานา	11	20,068
5.	Tanyong Lulo	ตันหยงลุโละ	3	6,583
6.	Khlong Maning	คลองมานิง	4	3,502
7.	Kamiyo	กะมิยอ	7	4,683
8.	Barahom	บาราโหม	3	3,024
9.	Pakaharang	ปะกาฮะรัง	8	5,571
10.	Rusamilae	รูสะมิแล	6	17,810
11.	Talubo	ตะลุโบะ	9	7,595
12.	Baraho	บาราเฮาะ	8	7,346
13.	Puyut	ปุยุด	7	7,115

=== Local administration ===
There is one town (thesaban mueang) in the district: Pattani (Thai: เทศบาลเมืองปัตตานี) consisting of sub-districts Sabarang, Anoru, and Chabang Tiko.

There is one sub-district municipality (thesaban tambon) in the district: Rusamilae (Thai: เทศบาลตำบลรูสะมิแล) consisting of sub-district Rusa Milae.

There are nine sub-district administrative organizations (SAO) in the district:

- Bana (Thai: องค์การบริหารส่วนตำบลบานา) consisting of sub-district Bana.
- Tanyong Lulo (Thai: องค์การบริหารส่วนตำบลตันหยงลุโละ) consisting of sub-district Tanyong Lulo.
- Khlong Maning (Thai: องค์การบริหารส่วนตำบลคลองมานิง) consisting of sub-district Khlong Maning.
- Kamiyo (Thai: องค์การบริหารส่วนตำบลกะมิยอ) consisting of sub-district Kamiyo.
- Barahom (Thai: องค์การบริหารส่วนตำบลบาราโหม) consisting of sub-district Barahom.
- Pakaharang (Thai: องค์การบริหารส่วนตำบลปะกาฮะรัง) consisting of sub-district Pakaharang.
- Talubo (Thai: องค์การบริหารส่วนตำบลตะลุโบะ) consisting of sub-district Talubo.
- Baraho (Thai: องค์การบริหารส่วนตำบลบาราเฮาะ) consisting of sub-district Baraho.
- Puyut (Thai: องค์การบริหารส่วนตำบลปุยุด) consisting of sub-district Puyut.
