= Thepha district =

District of Thailand

Thepha เทพา
- District
- District location in Songkhla province
- Coordinates: 6°49′42″N 100°57′54″E
- Country: Thailand
- Province: Songkhla

Area
  - Total: 978.0 km^{2} (377.6 sq mi)

Population (2008)
  - Total: 69,278
  - Density: 70.8/km^{2} (183/sq mi)
- Time zone: UTC+7 (ICT)
- Postal code: 90150
- Geocode: 9005

Thepha (Thai: เทพา, pronounced [tʰēː.pʰāː]; Pattani Malay: ตีบอ, pronounced [tīː.bɔː]) is a district (amphoe) in the southeastern part of Songkhla province, southern Thailand.

== Geography ==
Neighboring districts are (from the east clockwise): Nong Chik and Khok Pho of Pattani province; Saba Yoi, Na Thawi, and Chana of Songkhla Province. To the north is the Gulf of Thailand.

== Etymology ==
The name Thepha is a Thai language corruption of tiba, its original name, meaning 'arrive' in Malay.

== History ==
Thepa was at first a fourth-class mueang and subordinate of mueang Phatthalung. The governor had to present a golden and silver tree to the governor of Phatthalung to pay its tribute. In the reign of King Rama II the town was transferred to Songkhla and elevated to a third-class mueang.

In 1901 as part of the thesaphiban administrative reforms the mueang was reduced to a district of Songkhla. The district office was in Ban Phra Phut (บ้านพระพุทธ), village two of Thepha Subdistrict. When, in 1932, the railway was built through the district, the office was moved to a more convenient location in Ban Tha Phru (บ้านท่าพรุ), village one of Thepha Subdistrict, close to the railway station, then named Tha Muang (ท่าม่วง). Subsequently, the station was renamed Thepha.

== Administration ==
The district is divided into seven sub-districts (tambons), which are further subdivided into 65 villages (mubans). Thepha is a sub-district municipality, thesaban tambon, which covers parts of tambon Thepha. Lam Phlai a sub-district municipality covering the full tambon Lam Phlai. There are a further six tambon administrative organizations (TAO).

No.	Name	Thai	Malay	Villages	Pop.
1.	Thepha	เทพา	Tiba	8	11,667
2.	Pakbang	ปากบาง	Muara Sempit	8	8,673
3.	Koh Saba	เกาะสะบ้า	Pulau Sabak	8	5,310
4.	Lam Phlai	ลำไพล	Alor Pulai	11	14,003
5.	Tha Muang	ท่าม่วง	Pengkalan Mambong	14	15,778
6.	Wang Yai	วังใหญ่	Telaga Besar	8	6,616
7.	Sakom	สะกอม	Pantai Sakom	8	7,231

== Economy ==
Manguwang Food Co. on 7 July 2019 opened its durian-processing factory in the district. The 700 million baht factory is a joint venture by Thai and Chinese investors. It will process durian from local orchards into freeze-dried products for shipment to China. Employing about 1,200 locals, the factory will buy 12,000 tonnes of durian annually, one-third of it from local orchards. In 2020 that figure is projected to rise to 20,000 tonnes.

== Environment ==
The Pak Bang Sub-district of Thepha district is to be the site of the Electricity Generating Authority of Thailand's (EGAT) newest coal-fired generating plant, the largest of its kind in Thailand. This has raised environmental and health concerns among residents, aside from the eviction of 240 families, two mosques, two Muslim cemeteries, a religious school, and a Buddhist temple to make way for the 2,960 rai site. A public hearing in July 2015 on EGAT's plans to build the plant was ringed with razor wire to prevent opponents of the plan from gaining access to the hearing. The villagers of Pattani's Nong Chik district, who live some eight kilometres from the site, but who will also be affected by the power plant, were excluded from the hearings. The latest hearing, the third and final hearing on the Environment and Health Impact Assessment (EHIA) for the 2,000–2,400 megawatt plant, was policed by 400 soldiers, police, and volunteers. Some attendees admitted being transported to the hearing by local village leaders, who also provided them with gifts and food coupons. Songkhla Governor Thamrong Charoenkul chaired the hearing despite questions raised regarding his neutrality. He told the hearing that the project will benefit Thepa residents. "Since Egat has proposed the project, Thepha is now known nationwide. Shouldn't we be proud about that?" he said. Anuchart Palakawongse Na Ayudhya, director of EGAT's Project Environment Division, insisted EGAT's hearings were lawful. "We have organised the public review step by step according to the law," he said. Anuchart said EGAT did not bar anyone from expressing their opinions. "It's impossible to cancel the project. Most Thepha people support it," he said.

In August 2016, EGAT declared that construction of the plant would begin by May 2017 at the latest, in order to have it operational by April 2021, in accordance with EGAT's Power Development Plan, 2015. The major hurdle remaining is approval of the plant's EHIA for the power plant and coal transport pier. It must be vetted by the Natural Resources and Environmental Policy and Planning Office (ONEP). Two previous submissions of the EHIA were rejected by ONEP as they "needed improvement". In addition, locals claim that only 700 rai (112 hectares) of the 2,962 rai needed for the plant are state-owned. More than 240 families, or 800 people, live on adjacent plots earmarked for the plant. Most of them have refused to relocate. When EGAT hosted a meeting for landowners willing to sell their land, only some 25 persons showed up. EGAT officials maintain that 95 percent of Pak Bang Sub-district residents welcomed the project and that those opposing it were outsiders.

On 17 August 2017, an expert committee of the Natural Resources and Environmental Policy and Planning Office approved the 2,200-megawatt coal-fired power plant's EHIA, removing one of the last hurdles to the plant's construction. The EHIA's approval was met with renewed criticism. The Bangkok Post commented that, "These...assessments turn out to be just another rubber stamp for operators — in this case...EGAT...." A construction schedule has not yet been published.
