= Hat Yai district =

Hat Yai หาดใหญ่
- District
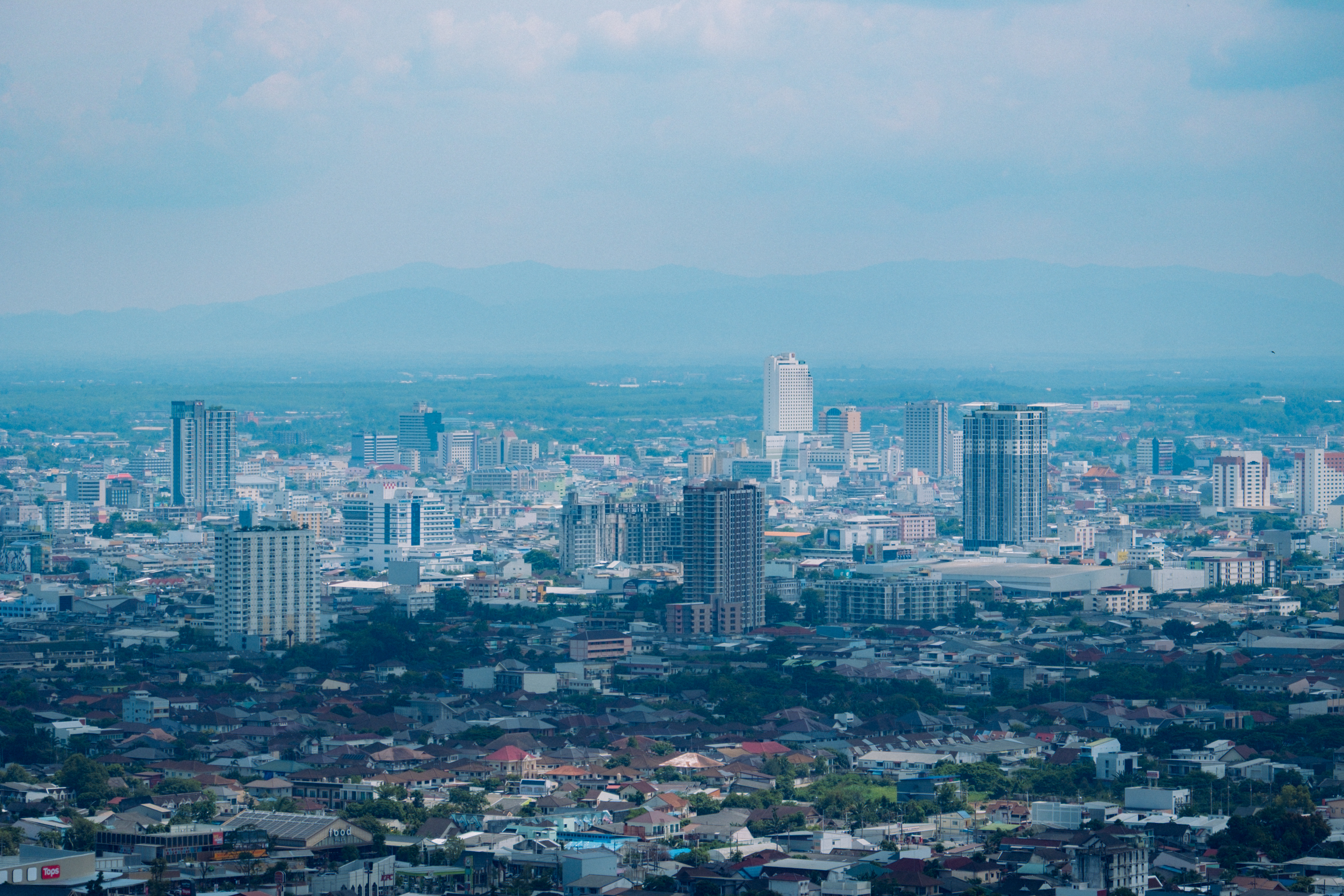
- Hat Yai City skylines from Kho Hong mountain, May 2025

- District location in Songkhla province
- Coordinates: 7°0′7″N 100°27′26″E
- Country: Thailand
- Province: Songkhla

Area
  - Total: 852.796 km^{2} (329.266 sq mi)

Population (2021)
  - Total: 404,044
  - Density: 473.74/km^{2} (1,227.0/sq mi)
- Time zone: UTC+7 (ICT)
- Postal code: 90110
- Geocode: 9011

Hat Yai (Thai: หาดใหญ่, pronounced [hàːt jàj]) is a district (amphoe) of Songkhla province, southern Thailand.

== Geography ==
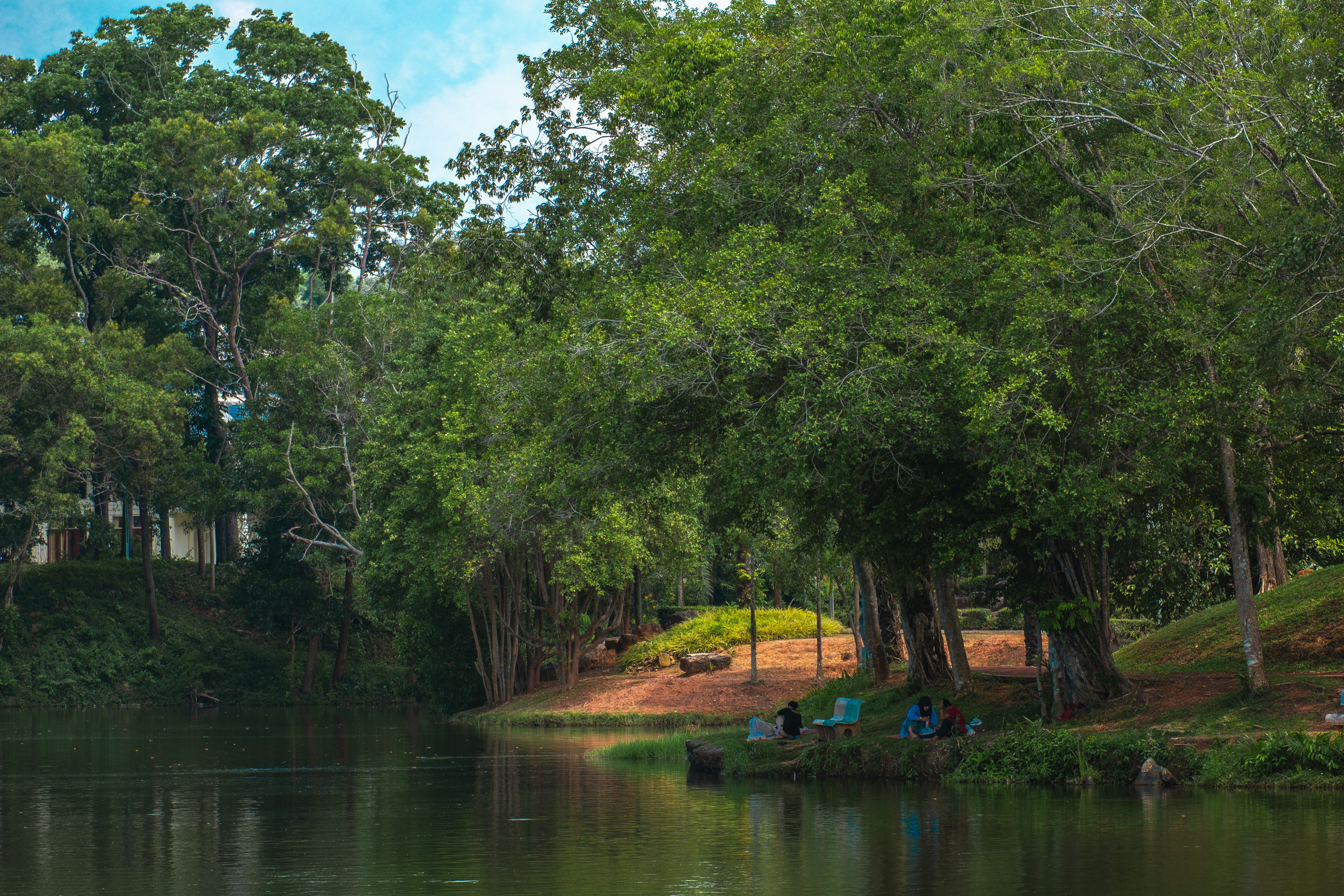
Hat Yai City Park

Neighboring districts are (from the west clockwise): Khuan Kalong of Satun province; Rattaphum, Bang Klam, Khuan Niang, Singhanakhon, Mueang Songkhla, Na Mom, Chana, Na Thawi, Sadao, and Khlong Hoi Khong.

The northeastern part of the district is on the shore of the Songkhla Lake.

== Administration ==
The district is divided into 13 sub-districts (tambons), which are further subdivided into 98 villages (mubans). The city (thesaban nakhon) Hat Yai covers tambon Hat Yai. There are four towns (thesaban mueang): Ban Phru covers parts of tambon Ban Phru, and Khlong Hae, Khuan Lang and Kho Hong each cover tambons of the same names. There is further one township (thesaban tambon). Pha Tong covers parts of tambon Pha Tong. The non-municipal areas are administered by nine tambon administrative organizations (TAO).

No.	Name	Thai name	Villages	Pop.
1.	Hat Yai	หาดใหญ่	-	158,412
2.	Khuan Lang	ควนลัง	6	42,266
3.	Khu Tao	คูเต่า	10	11,015
4.	Kho Hong	คอหงส์	8	44,916
5.	Khlong Hae	คลองแห	11	32,553
7.	Khlong U Taphao	คลองอู่ตะเภา	4	2,820
8.	Chalung	ฉลุง	6	7,285
11.	Thung Yai	ทุ่งใหญ่	6	5,131
12.	Thung Tamsao	ทุ่งตำเสา	10	16,053
13.	Thakham	ท่าข้าม	8	7,933
14.	Nam Noi	น้ำน้อย	10	13,470
16.	Ban Phru	บ้านพรุ	11	29,610
18.	Phatong	พะตง	8	13,530

Missing numbers are tambons which now form districts Bang Klam and Khlong Hoi Khong.
