= Nong Chik district =

Nong Chik หนองจิก
- District
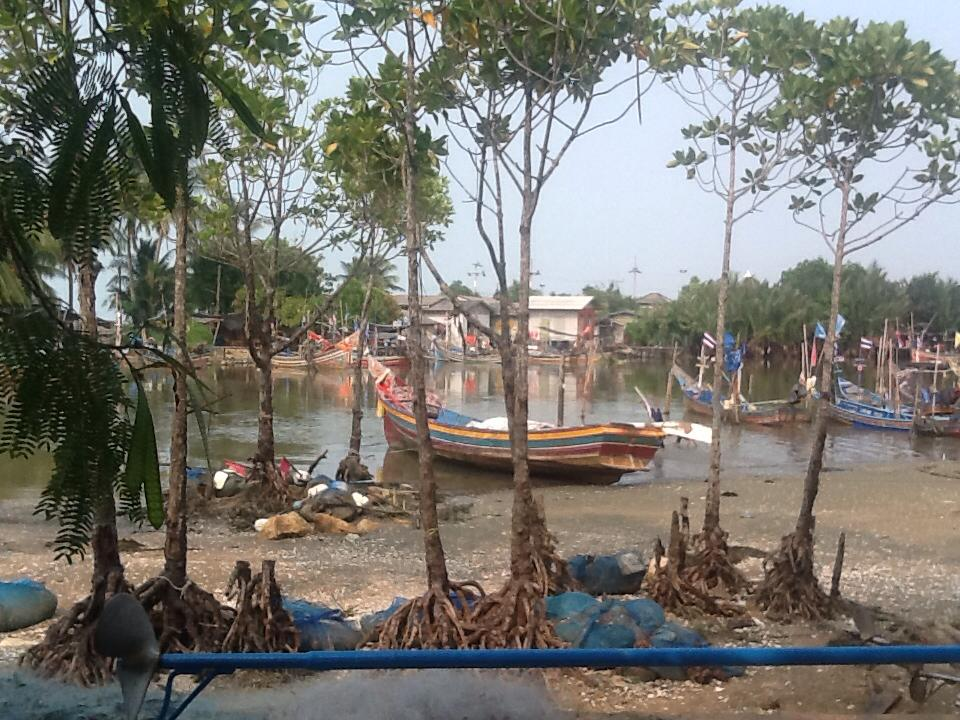
- Bangtawa in 2015.

- District location in Pattani province
- Coordinates: 6°50′40″N 101°10′43″E
- Country: Thailand
- Province: Pattani
- Seat: Tuyong

Area
  - Total: 231.5 km^{2} (89.4 sq mi)

Population (2014)
  - Total: 76,630
  - Density: 296.6/km^{2} (768/sq mi)
- Time zone: UTC+7 (ICT)
- Postal code: 94170
- Geocode: 9403

Nong Chik (Thai: หนองจิก, pronounced [nɔ̌ːŋ t͡ɕìk]) is a district (amphoe) in Pattani province, southern Thailand.

== History ==
Nong Chik was one of the seven states (mueang) into which the Pattani Kingdom was split in the early-19th century to diminish the power of the often rebellious tributary kingdom. The capital was put in tambon Nong Mai (Yarang District). In 1901 the district office was moved to Tuyong, where it remains.

Due to the district office location in Tuyong, the district was renamed "Tuyong" in 1917. In 1938 it was again renamed "Nong Chik".

== Geography ==
Neighboring districts are (from the east clockwise): Mueang Pattani, Yarang, Mae Lan, and Khok Pho of Pattani Province; and Thepha of Songkhla province. To the north is the Gulf of Thailand.

== Economy ==
Nong Chik is the center of the two year-old Orangpantai Fishing Enterprise (literally, 'sea gypsy company'). It is a cooperative that specializes in the catch, preparation, and sale of preserved fish. Its specialty is salted four-finger threadfins, locally known as plaa kulao, as well as salted spotted mackerel or plaa insee, dried squid, and smooth-textured shrimp paste.

The majority of its members belong to the Pattani Provincial Small-Scale Fisher Network Association, which works with local fishermen to conserve marine resources. Association members have one important rule—they must refrain from using destructive fishing gear and nets that trap juvenile fish as by-catch. The enforcement of this rule has caused fish stocks in the area to rebound.

== Administration ==
=== Central administration ===
Nong Chik is divided into 12 sub-districts (tambons), which are further subdivided into 76 administrative villages (mubans).

No.	Name	Thai	Villages	Pop.
1.	Ko Po	เกาะเปาะ	3	3,712
2.	Kholo Tanyong	คอลอตันหยง	8	5,788
3.	Don Rak	ดอนรัก	7	5,362
4.	Dato	ดาโต๊ะ	5	2,799
5.	Tuyong	ตุยง	8	12,751
6.	Tha Kamcham	ท่ากำชำ	7	7,159
7.	Bo Thong	บ่อทอง	9	12,991
8.	Bang Khao	บางเขา	7	7,866
9.	Bang Tawa	บางตาวา	2	3,574
10.	Pulo Puyo	ปุโละปุโย	9	7,570
11.	Yabi	ยาบี	6	3,760
12.	Lipa Sa-ngo	ลิปะสะโง	5	3,298

=== Local administration ===
There are two sub-district municipalities (thesaban tambons) in the district:

- Bo Thong (Thai: เทศบาลตำบลบ่อทอง) consisting of sub-district Bo Thong and parts of sub-district Bang Khao.
- Nong Chik (Thai: เทศบาลตำบลหนองจิก) consisting of parts of sub-district Tuyong.

There are 11 subdistrict administrative organizations (SAO) in the district:

- Ko Po (Thai: องค์การบริหารส่วนตำบลเกาะเปาะ) consisting of sub-district Ko Po.
- Kholo Tanyong (Thai: องค์การบริหารส่วนตำบลคอลอตันหยง), Malay: Kuala Tanjung) consisting of sub-district Kholo Tanyong.
- Don Rak (Thai: องค์การบริหารส่วนตำบลดอนรัก) consisting of sub-district Don Rak.
- Dato (Thai: องค์การบริหารส่วนตำบลดาโต๊ะ) consisting of sub-district Dato.
- Tuyong (Thai: องค์การบริหารส่วนตำบลตุยง), Malay: Tunjung) consisting of parts of sub-district Tuyong.
- Tha Kamcham (Thai: องค์การบริหารส่วนตำบลท่ากำชำ) consisting of sub-district Tha Kamcham.
- Bang Khao (Thai: องค์การบริหารส่วนตำบลบางเขา) consisting of parts of sub-district Bang Khao.
- Bang Tawa (Thai: องค์การบริหารส่วนตำบลบางตาวา) consisting of sub-district Bang Tawa.
- Pulo Puyo (Thai: องค์การบริหารส่วนตำบลปุโละปุโย), Malay: Pulau Puyuh) consisting of sub-district Pulo Puyo.
- Yabi (Thai: องค์การบริหารส่วนตำบลยาบี), Malay: Jabi) consisting of sub-district Yabi.
- Lipa Sa-ngo (Thai: องค์การบริหารส่วนตำบลลิปะสะโง) consisting of sub-district Lipa Sa-ngo.
