= Pattani, Thailand =

Pattani ปัตตานี
- Town
- เทศบาลเมืองปัตตานี
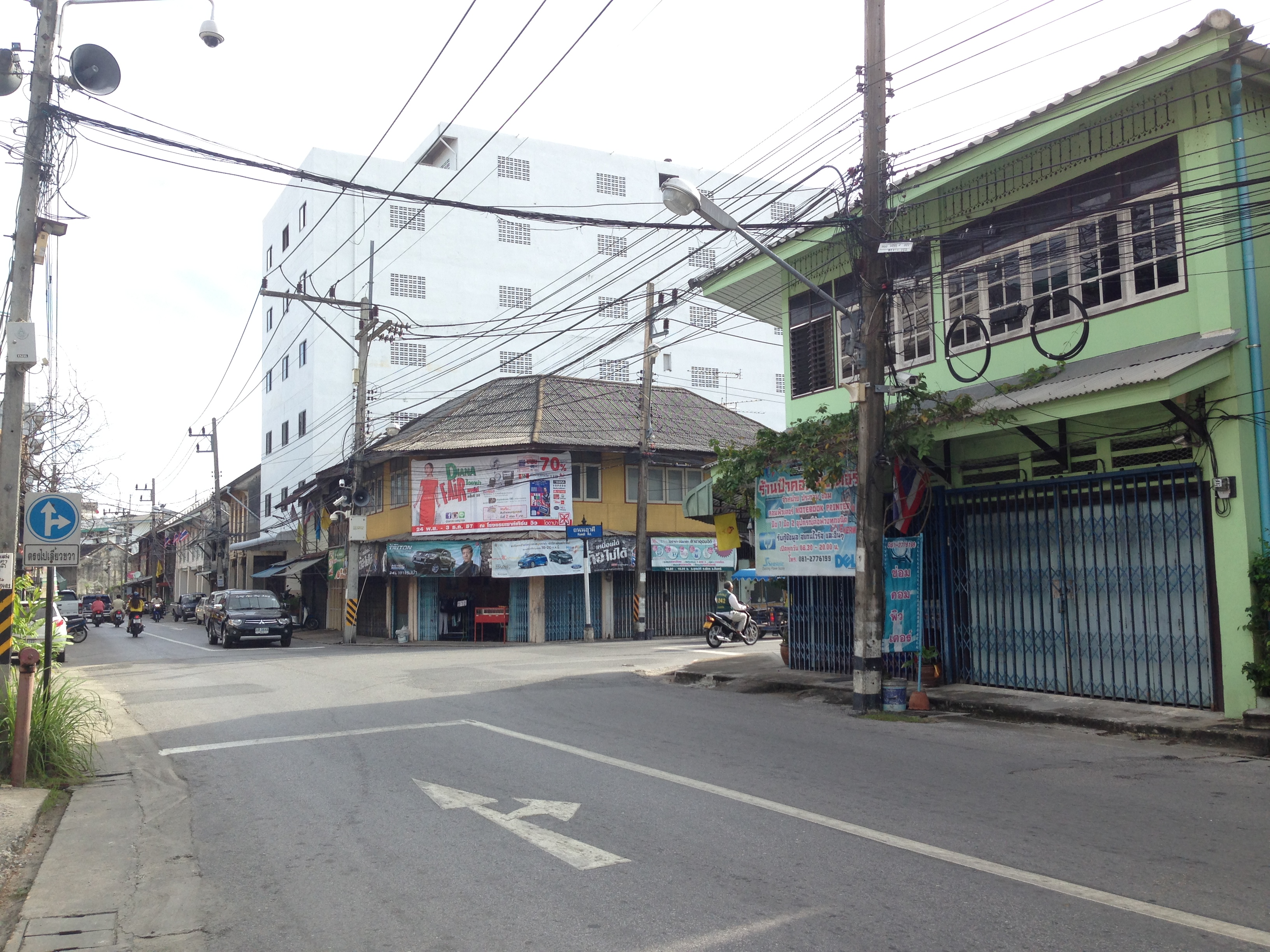
- Pattani

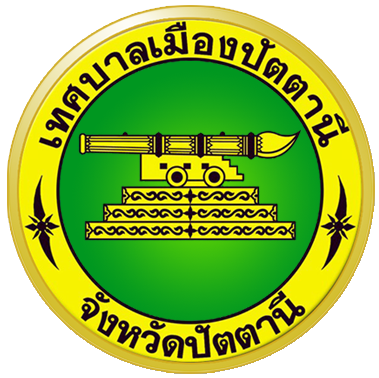
- Seal
- Nickname: Tani
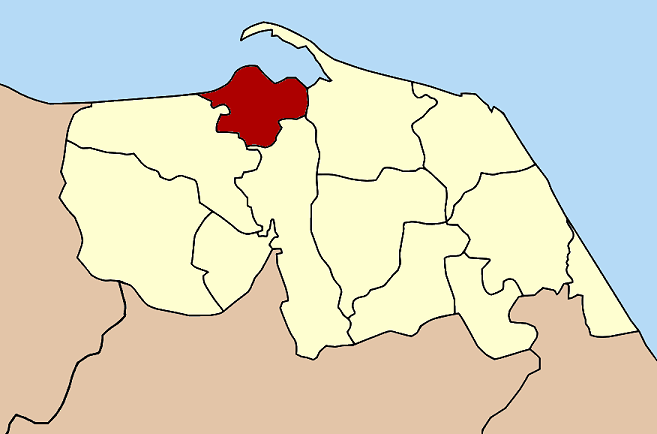
- Location of Mueang Pattani district (red) in Pattani Province (Pattani town is located within Mueang Pattani district.)

- Location in Thailand
- Coordinates: 6°51′59″N 101°15′3″E
- Country: Thailand
- Province: Pattani
- District: Mueang Pattani

Government
  - Mayor: Pitak Korkiatpitak

Area
  - Town: 4.78 km^{2} (1.85 sq mi)
  - Metro: 96.86 km^{2} (37.40 sq mi)

Population (2018)
  - Town: 44,353
  - Density: 9,280/km^{2} (24,000/sq mi)
- Time zone: UTC+7 (ICT)
- Area code: (+66) 73
- Website: pattanicity.go.th

Pattani is a town (thesaban mueang) in the far south of Thailand, near the border with Malaysia. It is the capital of Pattani Province. The city has a population of 44,353 (2018). It covers the whole tambon Sabarang, Anoru and Chabang Tiko of Mueang Pattani district.

Pattani lies 1,056 km south of Bangkok, and is located at the mouth of the Pattani River. A small port is known to have existed at the river mouth Kuala Bekah in the 16th century. The historic centre of Patani was originally located a few miles away where the Krue Se Mosque is located. The older capital of Patani was captured and sacked by Siam in 1785.

The local dialect of Malay is called Pattani Malay or Yawi in Thai (derived from Jawi).

== Etymology ==
Some believe that the name Pattani originated from Malay name Patani (Jawi: ڤطاني), which can mean "this beach" in Pattani Malay language. (In standard Malay, this would be pantai ini.) According to a legend, the founder of Pattani was a raja from Kota Malikha named Phaya Tunakpa. Phaya Tunakpa went hunting one day and saw a beautiful albino mouse-deer the size of a goat, which then disappeared. He asked his men where the animal had gone, and they replied: "Pata ning lah!" ("This beach!" in the Pattani Malay language). They searched for the mouse-deer but found instead an old couple, where the old man identified himself as Che' Tani ("Mister Tani"). The old man said that he was sent by the raja's grandfather to build a new town further beyond but had fallen ill on the journey; as he could not go any further, he stayed at that place. The raja then ordered a town be built at the site where the mouse-deer had disappeared. The town became Patani, which is believed to be named either after "this beach" where the mouse-deer had disappeared. Alternatively, it has also been said to be named after the old man as Pak Tani meaning "Father Tani".

Some also say the word Pattani is derived from "Petani" in Malay which means "farmer". Another suggestion is that it derives from a Sanskrit word pathini, meaning "virgin nymph"; Pathini is also said to be the title of a daughter of Merong Mahawangsa, founder of the preceding kingdom of Langkasuka.

== History ==
Modern Pattani is located at the mouth of the Pattani River. The river may have changed course and empty into the sea at the current location in the 16th century. A small port existed in the current location at Kuala Bekah (Kuala Sungai Patani) at the mouth of Patani River by the late 16th and early 17th centuries. Kuala Bekah was one of the two river mouths of old Pattani, the other being Kuala Ru, near which was the old historical centre of the Patani Kingdom that ruled over the region of Patani. The older centre was located 6–7 km to the east of the present city; near Ban Kru Se or Kampong Kersik, which is where the Krue Se Mosque is located. Pattani was captured and sacked by the Siamese in 1785. The town centre developed in the current location and the Sultan moved to Cabang Tiga at the southern side of present-day Pattani in the 19th century. The Patani City municipality was established in 1935 by royal decree.

== Climate ==
Pattani has a tropical monsoon climate according to the Köppen climate classification, with a lengthy wet season and a brief dry season. The temperatures and humidity are high year round, with slightly higher temperatures in April, just as the monsoon arrives. The wet season is long, lasting May-December, and the dry season short, covering only January-April. The months of October, November, and December are particularly wet.

Climate data for Pattani (1991–2020, extremes 1964-present)
Month	Jan	Feb	Mar	Apr	May	Jun	Jul	Aug	Sep	Oct	Nov	Dec	Year
Record high °C (°F)	34.3 (93.7)	35.9 (96.6)	37.9 (100.2)	38.9 (102.0)	38.0 (100.4)	36.6 (97.9)	36.4 (97.5)	35.8 (96.4)	36.0 (96.8)	35.0 (95.0)	34.0 (93.2)	33.9 (93.0)	38.9 (102.0)
Mean daily maximum °C (°F)	31.1 (88.0)	32.3 (90.1)	33.5 (92.3)	34.3 (93.7)	34.1 (93.4)	33.5 (92.3)	33.3 (91.9)	33.2 (91.8)	32.7 (90.9)	32.0 (89.6)	30.7 (87.3)	30.1 (86.2)	32.6 (90.6)
Daily mean °C (°F)	26.3 (79.3)	26.7 (80.1)	27.5 (81.5)	28.4 (83.1)	28.5 (83.3)	28.1 (82.6)	27.8 (82.0)	27.7 (81.9)	27.4 (81.3)	27.0 (80.6)	26.6 (79.9)	26.2 (79.2)	27.4 (81.2)
Mean daily minimum °C (°F)	22.7 (72.9)	22.4 (72.3)	23.0 (73.4)	24.0 (75.2)	24.5 (76.1)	24.3 (75.7)	24.0 (75.2)	23.9 (75.0)	23.9 (75.0)	23.9 (75.0)	23.8 (74.8)	23.3 (73.9)	23.6 (74.5)
Record low °C (°F)	17.5 (63.5)	16.7 (62.1)	18.5 (65.3)	17.4 (63.3)	21.6 (70.9)	20.6 (69.1)	20.4 (68.7)	21.0 (69.8)	20.8 (69.4)	21.3 (70.3)	20.0 (68.0)	19.4 (66.9)	16.7 (62.1)
Average precipitation mm (inches)	94.2 (3.71)	36.2 (1.43)	54.1 (2.13)	83.2 (3.28)	133.9 (5.27)	118.7 (4.67)	128.8 (5.07)	147.0 (5.79)	140.8 (5.54)	221.8 (8.73)	400.5 (15.77)	392.8 (15.46)	1,952 (76.9)
Average precipitation days (≥ 1.0 mm)	6.2	2.4	4.7	5.9	10.5	9.8	9.5	10.3	11.7	15.4	18.5	15.3	120.2
Average relative humidity (%)	80.0	81.6	78.9	78.6	78.2	79.3	79.8	79.5	80.9	83.8	86.5	85.6	81.0
Average dew point °C (°F)	22.6 (72.7)	22.4 (72.3)	23.1 (73.6)	23.9 (75.0)	24.2 (75.6)	24.0 (75.2)	23.7 (74.7)	23.5 (74.3)	23.6 (74.5)	23.8 (74.8)	23.9 (75.0)	23.3 (73.9)	23.5 (74.3)
Mean monthly sunshine hours	145.7	166.7	148.8	144.0	114.7	111.0	114.7	114.7	108.0	111.6	105.0	108.5	1,493.4
Source 1: NOAA, Meteomanz (record)
Source 2: Office of Water Management and Hydrology, Royal Irrigation Department (sun 1981–2010)
