= Khok Pho district =

Khok Pho โคกโพธิ์
- District
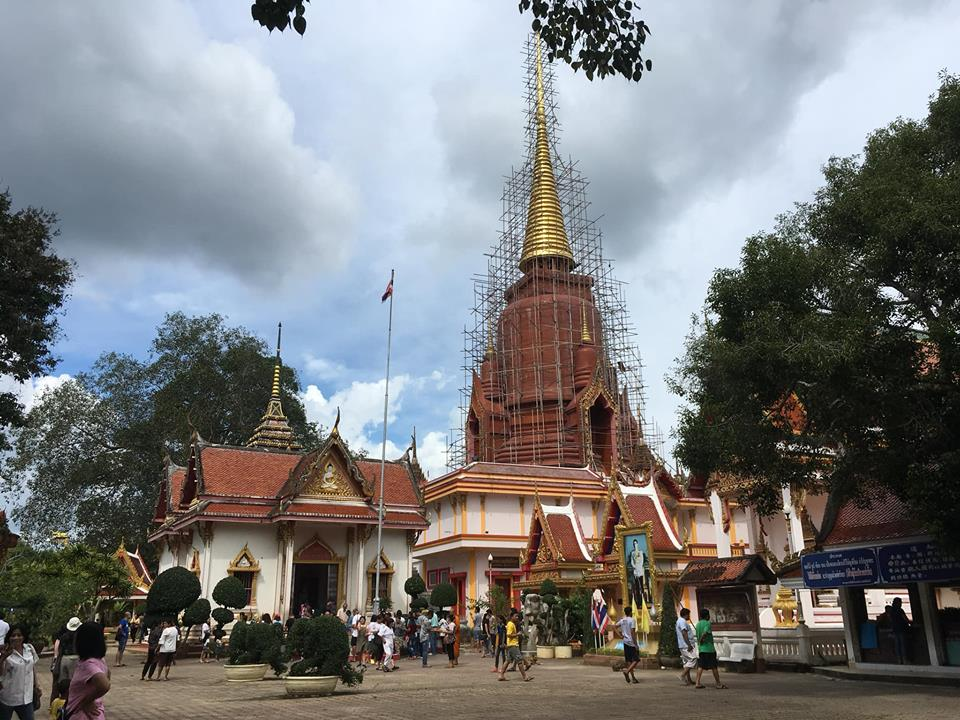
- Chang Hai Temple in 2018

- District location in Pattani province
- Coordinates: 6°43′46″N 101°5′46″E
- Country: Thailand
- Province: Pattani
- Seat: Khok Pho
- Subdistricts: 12
- Mubans: 81

Area
  - Total: 339.414 km^{2} (131.048 sq mi)

Population (2014)
  - Total: 66,840
  - Density: 189.5/km^{2} (491/sq mi)
- Time zone: UTC+7 (ICT)
- Postal code: 94120
- Geocode: 9402

Khok Pho (Thai: โคกโพธิ์, pronounced [kʰôːk pʰōː]) is a district (amphoe) of Pattani province, southern Thailand.

== History ==
The area of the district originally belonged to Mueang Nong Chik, one of the seven provinces of Pattani Kingdom. The district was established by splitting it from Nong Chik district, at first named "Mueang Kao" (เมืองเก่า). As the district office was in tambon Makrut it was later renamed "Makrut District" (มะกรูด).

In 1929 King Rama VII visited the district to see the solar eclipse on 9 May. During this visit he saw a building in Khok Pho which he thought to be more fitting as the district office, thus the office was moved there. In 1939 the district received its current name Khok Pho.

== Geography ==
Neighboring districts are (from the north clockwise): Nong Chik and Mae Lan of Pattani Province; Mueang Yala of Yala province; and Saba Yoi and Thepha of Songkhla province.

Namtok Sai Khao National Park covers an area of 110 km^{2} of forested hills of the Sankalakhiri mountain range at the border of Pattani, Yala, and Songkhla Provinces.

== Administration ==
=== Central administration ===
Khok Pho is divided into 12 sub-districts (tambons), which are further subdivided into 81 administrative villages (mubans).

No.	Name	Thai	Villages	Pop.
1.	Khok Pho	โคกโพธิ์	12	10,976
2.	Makrut	มะกรูด	7	5,708
3.	Bang Kro	บางโกระ	5	2,650
4.	Pabon	ป่าบอน	5	4,041
5.	Sai Khao	ทรายขาว	6	4,141
6.	Na Pradu	นาประดู่	7	9,236
7.	Paklo	ปากล่อ	9	6,311
8.	Thungphla	ทุ่งพลา	5	3,780
11.	Tha Ruea	ท่าเรือ	7	4,877
13.	Naket	นาเกตุ	7	7,130
14.	Khuan Nori	ควนโนรี	6	5,015
15.	Chang Hai Tok	ช้างให้ตก	5	2,975

Missing numbers are tambons which now form Mae Lan District.

=== Local administration ===
There are three sub-district municipalities (thesaban tambons) in the district:

- Khok Pho (Thai: เทศบาลตำบลโคกโพธิ์) consisting of parts of sub-district Khok Pho.
- Na Pradu (Thai: เทศบาลตำบลนาประดู่) consisting of parts of sub-district Na Pradu.
- Makrut (Thai: เทศบาลตำบลมะกรูด) consisting of sub-district Makrut.

There are 11 sub-district administrative organizations (SAO) in the district:

- Khok Pho (Thai: องค์การบริหารส่วนตำบลโคกโพธิ์) consisting of parts of sub-district Khok Pho.
- Bang Kro (Thai: องค์การบริหารส่วนตำบลบางโกระ) consisting of sub-district Bang Kro.
- Pabon (Thai: องค์การบริหารส่วนตำบลป่าบอน) consisting of sub-district Pabon.
- Sai Khao (Thai: องค์การบริหารส่วนตำบลทรายขาว) consisting of sub-district Sai Khao.
- Na Pradu (Thai: องค์การบริหารส่วนตำบลนาประดู่) consisting of parts of sub-district Na Pradu.
- Paklo (Thai: องค์การบริหารส่วนตำบลปากล่อ) consisting of sub-district Paklo.
- Thungphla (Thai: องค์การบริหารส่วนตำบลทุ่งพลา) consisting of sub-district Thungphla.
- Tha Ruea (Thai: องค์การบริหารส่วนตำบลท่าเรือ) consisting of sub-district Tha Ruea.
- Naket (Thai: องค์การบริหารส่วนตำบลนาเกตุ) consisting of sub-district Naket.
- Khuan Nori (Thai: องค์การบริหารส่วนตำบลควนโนรี) consisting of sub-district Khuan Nori.
- Chang Hai Tok (Thai: องค์การบริหารส่วนตำบลช้างให้ตก) consisting of sub-district Chang Hai Tok.

== Places of interest ==
- Wat Chang Hai Rat Buranaram, simply known as Wat Chang Hai (Thai: วัดช้างให้ราษฎร์บูรณะ, วัดช้างให้). Notable Thai temple, a legendary monk Luang Pu Thuat was once abbot here.
