= Operation Krohcol =

1941 failed British invasion of Thailand

- Part of the Battle of Malaya, World War II
Date	8–13 December 1941
Location	Kroh-Pattani Road, Thailand–Federated Malay States border
Result	Axis victory

Belligerents
United Kingdom: India	Thailand; Japan

Commanders and leaders
(United Kingdom) Henry Moorhead; (United Kingdom) Cyril Stokes	(Thailand) Prayoon Rattanakit; (Empire of Japan) Takuro Matsui

Strength
Krohcol; 3/16th Punjab Regiment; 5/14th Punjab Regiment	(Thailand) Royal Thai Police (RTP); Betong RTP; (Empire of Japan) 5th Division; 42nd Regiment

Operation Krohcol, or the Battle for The Ledge, was a British operation in December 1941 to invade southern Thailand following the Japanese invasion of Malaya and of Thailand during World War II. It was authorised by Lieutenant-General Arthur Percival as a "mini Matador" after Operation Matador, a plan to advance into Thailand to forestall a Japanese invasion, that had been opposed by the British government and was not carried out. Due to delays in authorisation by Percival and in the forwarding of his order, the need to reorganise the troops for Krohcol instead of Matador, and resistance from Thai policemen the Kroh column did not reach the Ledge in time.

== Mini Matador ==
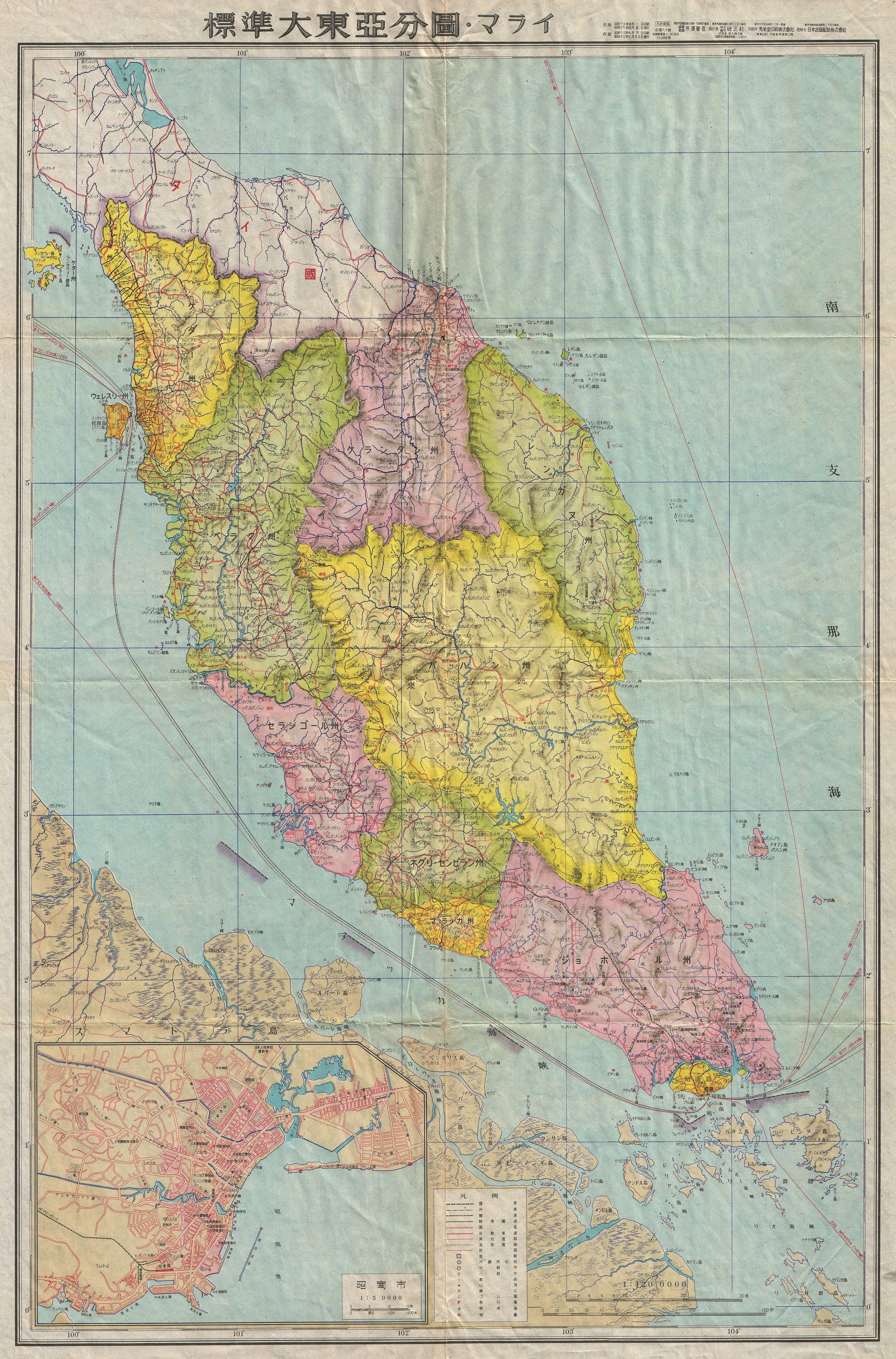
1942 Japanese map of the Malay Peninsula and Singapore

As an alternative to Operation Matador, three ad hoc columns were put together to harass and delay the Japanese advance from their beachheads at Songkhla and Pattani.

Krohcol was the most important of the three. Krohcol was tasked with the destruction of the feature known as the Ledge. Destruction of the Ledge would block the road from Pattani, ensuring the security of the lines of communication and retreat of the 11th Indian Infantry Division. For the Japanese, capture of the Ledge would allow them access to the rear areas of the 11th Indian Division, either forcing the British to retreat from Perak and Kedah or possibly cutting off the 11th Indian Division.

== Forces ==
=== British Commonwealth Forces ===
The British force was named Krohcol as it was operating from the town of Kroh at the Perak–Thailand border and 'col' is short for column (meaning battle group).

The original Krohcol was to consist of:

- 3/16th Punjab Regiment - Lt. Col. Henry Dawson Moorhead
- 5/14th Punjab Regiment - Lt. Col. Cyril Lovesy Lawrence Stokes ( † in captivity on 15 February 1942 following the Battle of Slim River)
- 10th Indian Mountain Battery - Major D.G.C. Cowie
- 45th Field Company, Royal Bombay Sappers & Miners - Major J.R. Dinwiddie

The column that departed Kroh consisted of men from the 3/16th Punjab and some engineers under the command of Lt Col Henry Moorhead, carried in the Marmon-Herrington AWD trucks of the 2nd/3rd Australian Motor Transport Company under Major G.A.C. Kiernan. Krohcol was understrength and delayed due to a second battalion the 5/14th Punjab Regiment and a light artillery battery failing to arrive on time. The column left without them for a 6 mi (9.7 km) stretch of road cut through a steep hillside and bounded on the other side by sheer drop into a river and known as The Ledge. Collapsing the hillside on to the road would cause the Japanese invasion force considerable delay.

=== Thailand Forces ===
Royal Thai Police

Opposing this Commonwealth invasion force was the resistance of the policemen and volunteers from Betong under Major Prayoon Rattanakit, who caused further delays to the column. The Thai Police were, at the same time combating the Japanese 5th Division at Pattani, prior to a ceasefire between the two sides.

=== Japanese Forces ===
5th Infantry Division

- 42nd Infantry Regiment - Colonel Tadao Ando
  - Battalion, 42nd Regiment - Major Shigeharu Asaeda
  - 2 Companies, 14th Tank Regiment

== Battle of Betong ==
=== 8 December ===
Krohcol crossed the frontier some 14 hours after the Japanese landings at Kota Bharu and met an opposing force from Thai policemen and civilian volunteers led by Major Prayoon Rattanakit, police commissioner of the town of Betong.

At the Thai-Malay border the first Sepoy to cross the customs barrier was shot dead by armed Thai Constabulary.

This force harassed the British column from the safety of the surrounding forests and felled rubber trees across the narrow road, slowing the progress of the Bren gun carriers. Much of the Thai population of Betong evacuated the town, deserting the Chinese and Indian merchants.

=== 9 December ===
Thai resistance delayed the Punjabis until afternoon and they did not reach the town of Betong, only five miles (8.0 km) inside the frontier, until evening. When Krohcol entered Betong, a Thai constable commanding a police unit allowed them to pass through unopposed. He then approached Lt Col Moorhead and courteously apologised for the "mistake." It is not known why Moorhead did not immediately push on to the Ledge, but the delay proved fatal.

=== 10 December ===
On the morning of 10 December, 3/16th Punjab set off from Betong and headed for the Ledge, 26 mi (42 km) away. The Japanese 42nd Regiment of the 5th Division with two companies of light tanks, that had landed at Pattani at 03:00, won the race, reaching the Ledge at midday on 10 December.

About 14:00, while advancing through a ravine above the Pattani River and still 1 mi (1.6 km) short of the Ledge at km 37, Krohcol's advanced A (P.M.) Company (Subadar Sher Khan) came under fire again, this time from the Japanese 5th Division. A Company had advanced around a hill and was out of sight when it came under fire. Moorhead sent forward D (P.M.s) Company (Lieutenant Zarif Khan) along the road to support A Company, and C (Dogra) Company (Captain K.A.H. Casson) was sent over the thick jungle covered hill on the left flank. B (Sikh) Company (Lieutenant G.B. Palmer) covered the battalion's right flank.

Shortly afterwards, Moorhead lost contact with all three lead companies. Later in the afternoon a runner from D Company reported that A Company was in a desperate battle against tanks and infantry with D Company in support. The battalion adjutant, Captain A.E. Charlton, went forward across a wooded bridge over the Kampong To stream and with the runner he turned the sharp bend a hundred meters ahead. On rounding the bend, Charlton discovered a Japanese tank a short distance ahead and the mortar section of A Company in a heavy firefight. Charlton hurried back to the wooden bridge and brought forward the battalion's anti-tank platoon. Major Dinwiddie's Sappers took the bridge apart by hand. When the tank rounded the bend, it received a hot reception from the battalion's Boys Anti-Tank Rifles and retreated. Japanese infantry had now occupied the road ahead. B and C Companies returned shortly before nightfall. By midnight on 10 December Lt Col Stokes with 5/14th Punjab and the 10th Mountain Battery transported by 2/3rd Australian MT Company had arrived at Kroh.

With no possibility of any further advance, and now cut off from two of his companies, Moorhead remained with HQ Company and B Company at the bridge position with the sounds of heavy fighting carrying on throughout the night.

=== 11 December ===
The situation on the morning of 11 December was that Moorhead held the bridge at km 37 (25 miles north of Betong), but he had lost contact with A and D Companies. Havildar Manawar Khan and eight men from A Company returned with the news that Subadar Sher Khan and A Company had been destroyed by tanks and infantry.

Lt Col Stokes' 5/14th Punjab and the 10th Mountain Battery spent the morning preparing defensive positions at Kroh, whilst Stokes himself went forward to consult with Moorhead. Moorhead ordered Stokes to prepare a position nine miles (14 km) north of Betong to cover the battalion when it withdrew. Stokes left C (P.M.) Company, 5/14th Punjab (Lieut C.E.N. Hopkins-Husson) at Kroh and moved forward with the rest of his battalion plus the mountain battery to the 15 km post where they prepared new positions.

The NCO reported that on the previous day, A Company had advanced 700 yards (640 m) beyond the bridge when they had spotted Japanese tanks and infantry coming from the Ledge position. Subadar Sher Khan deployed his company into the jungle east of the road and allowed the two leading tanks to pass. Once they had passed Khan ordered his men to charge the Japanese infantry. Khan was almost immediately severely wounded, but kneeling beside the road, he continued to give encouragement to his men, and the Japanese retreated in complete disorder, leaving a number of casualties. A second group of two tanks and infantry arrived soon after and the first tank ran over the wounded Subadar, killing him instantly. The rest of his company fought fiercely for the next half-hour, inflicting many casualties, but caught on the open road they were eventually wiped out. Only one NCO managed to escape, with eight other survivors. At 11:00 on 11 December, to the relief of Moorhead, Lieutenant Zarif Khan and D Company returned through the jungle, having hung on to their position until nightfall. Lieutenant Khan withdrew into the jungle, and taking a long detour, reached the battalion positions, having lost 15 men.

During the afternoon of 11 December the battalion was attacked three times, the final attack before nightfall was of battalion strength along the entirety of the 3/16th Punjab perimeter. The Japanese Type 41 75 mm Mountain Guns destroyed most of the Punjabi carriers, but were eventually put out of action by the Punjab 2-inch (51 mm) mortars. The 2/3rd Australian Motor Transport Company and the 36th Field Ambulance evacuated the Punjabi wounded throughout the day. With casualties mounting, Moorhead made up his mind to fall back to Betong, with permission from divisional headquarters. Moorhead telephoned Colonel Harrison (GSO 1), who told him that he had to hang on until the orders arrived. Written permission to withdraw to Betong had to be carried by motorcycle messenger from Murray-Lyon at his HQ 113 miles (182 km) away.

=== 12 December ===
The battalion held its position throughout the night, but by dawn it became evident that the Japanese were attempting to outflank the battalion from the east and south. Soon after at 07:00 the strongest Japanese attack began, supported by the outflanking forces to the east and south. Moorhead decided that he had to attempt to withdraw rapidly.

Lieutenant Palmer's Sikh Company was able to extricate itself, but at the cost of 30 casualties whilst Captain Casson's Dogra Company soon found itself surrounded. Casson gave orders for his men to fight their way out. A handful of survivors reached D Company's positions. The survivors reported that both Casson and his second in command 2nd Lieutenant Frank Skyrme had been killed in the hand-to-hand fighting. Captain Harry Casson (from the island of Saint Vincent) was reported missing in action, believed killed. In reality, he had survived the battle, but was cut off. He survived in the jungle for the next five months, eventually being captured on 24 April 1942.

Nearly outflanked by the Japanese and under severe artillery fire, Krohcol began their retreat. Colonel Moorhead, armed with a rifle, remained with the rearguard of four surviving Bren carriers. As they were just leaving two of the carriers were hit by shell fire. Moorhead jumped aboard the two remaining Bren carriers, but not before rescuing a wounded Punjabi soldier (Moorhead spotted him lying on the shell-blasted road, lifting a weary hand of farewell to him. He leaped out of the carrier, carried him on his shoulder, and returned to the carrier). Moorhead was forced to make a fighting retreat back to Betong throughout 12 December, where they passed through Lt. Col. Stokes' 5/14th Punjab, which was digging in. The 3/16th Punjab were reduced to around 350 officers and men. Japanese scouts found the 5/14th Punjabi's position just after dark and probed the area throughout the night.

=== 13 December ===
At first light on 13 December the Japanese attacked the position with light tanks and motorised infantry. One light tank was destroyed and a number of frontal infantry attacks beaten off. With their usual speed the Japanese were soon pushing troops around Stokes' flanks. The 5/14th Punjab were forced to withdraw back to Kroh, which they did with relatively minor casualties. The Japanese released a prisoner from a local jail, an ex-bandit who knew the area well. Betong was re-occupied, and the force under Prayoon began taking punitive actions against the local Chinese, who were believed to have greeted Krohcol flying the Union Jack as well as the Kuomintang flag. A local Indian accused of volunteering his services (as a guide) to Krohcol was tracked down, cornered, and shot dead by a group of vengeful Thais.

== Laycol ==
One of the other columns, consisting of 200 truck-borne troops from the 1/8th Punjabis, and a section of the 273rd Anti-Tank Battery all under the command of Major E.R. Andrews, had crossed the Thai border at the same time as Krohcol. The column, named Laycol after Brigadier William Lay, commander of the 6th Indian Infantry Brigade, crossed the frontier at 17:30 on 8 December 1941 and moved towards Songkhla to harass and delay the enemy. Laycol reached Ban Sadao, ten miles (16 km) north of the frontier at dusk, where it halted and took up a position north of the village. Laycol made contact with a Japanese mechanised column from Colonel Saeki's reconnaissance unit of the 5th Division with a company of tanks from the 1st Tank Regiment. The force was led by the tanks and moved in close formation with full headlights blazing. The two leading tanks were knocked out by the anti-tank guns, but the Japanese infantry quickly debussed and started an enveloping movement around the flanks of the Punjabis. Laycol withdrew on 11 December through the outpost position at Kampong Imam, destroying two bridges and partially destroying a third on the way back.

== Armoured train ==
The last column was an armoured train, with 30 men from the 2/16th Punjab Regiment and some engineers, advancing into Thailand from Padang Besar in Perlis. This armoured train reached Khlong Ngae, in southern Thailand, and destroyed a 200-foot (61 m) bridge before withdrawing to Padang Besar.

== See also ==
- Operation Matador (1941)
- Japanese Invasion of Thailand
