= Kingdom of Reman =

19th century Malay kingdom

Reman Kingdom Kerajaan Reman (ms) كراجأن رمان (jawi) รามัน (th)
- 1810–1902
- Southern Siam and northern Malaya in 1900, with Reman located in the centre.
- Status: Autonomy of Patani Kingdom; Protectorate of Siam
- Capital: Kota Baru
- Common languages: Malay, Reman Malay
- Religion: Sunni Islam
- Government: Monarchy
- Raja
  - 1810–1836: Tuan Tok Nik Tok Leh/Tuan Mansur
  - 1849–1867: Tuan Nik Ulu/Tuan Kundur
  - 1867–1875: Tuan Timur
  - 1875–1901: Tuan Jagung/Tengku Abdul Kandis
- History
  - Reorganisation of former Patani Kingdom: 1810
  - Anglo-Siamese Treaty of 1909: 1902
Preceded by	Succeeded by
Patani Kingdom	Rattanakosin Kingdom; Federated Malay States
- Today part of: Thailand; Malaysia

The Kingdom of Reman or Kingdom of Rahman (Malay: Kerajaan Reman; Jawi: كراجأن رمان; Thai: รามัน; RTGS: Raman) was a landlocked semi-independent Malay kingdom in the northern Malay Peninsula.

It was one of seven regions of Patani Kingdom, an autonomous tributary state of Siam, between 1810 and 1902. Tuan Mansor, a member of the Patani aristocracy, ascended to the throne in 1810.

The state's territory straddles the present-day Malaysia–Thailand border, covering Amphoe Raman in Yala province in Thailand, as well as Hulu Perak District and parts of Jeli and Upper Kelantan regions in Malaysia.

== Etymology ==
The name of the state may be derived from a Patani Malay word rama', cognate to standard Malay ramai, meaning "a large assembly". It is likely named after a growing settlement founded in the area around the late 18th century.

The earliest English-language reference of the state was made in 1818, between an agreement by the Governor of Prince of Wales' Island (Penang), John Bannerman to Tuan Long Mansur, the king of Reman in Kroh; another reference was written in 1824 by John Anderson, a Scottish diplomatic agent who stated Reman as one of the seven federated states of Patani. The territory was also referred to as Rahman and Rehman in English, and Raman (รามัน) in Thai.

Henry Burney, a British commercial traveller and diplomat for the British East India Company, recorded in 1826 that Reman was one of the fourteen polities that pay tribute to the Siamese through their representatives in the provinces of Nakhon Si Thammarat and Songkhla.

== History ==
=== Origin ===
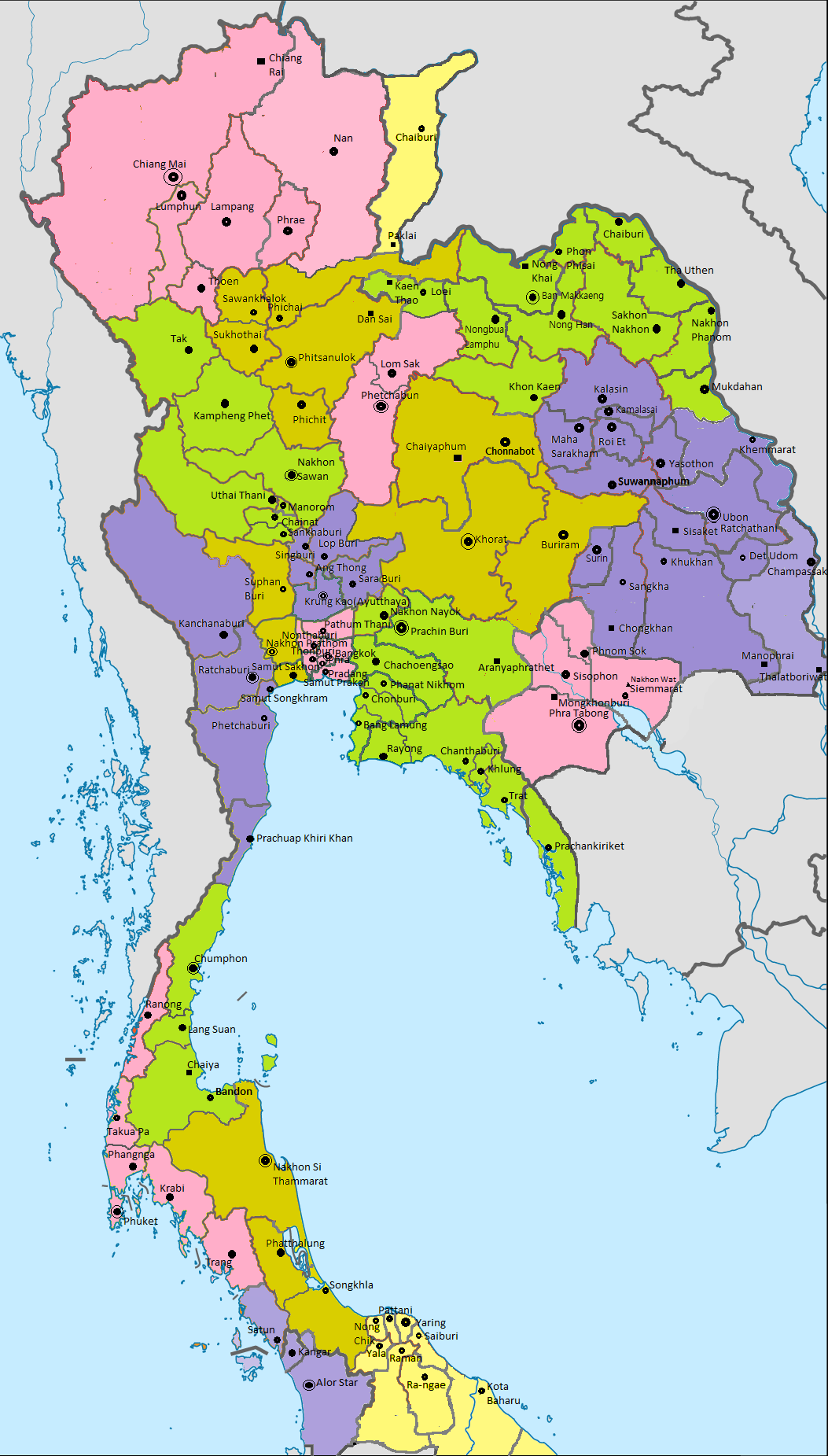
Map of Reman as vassal of Siam in 1900

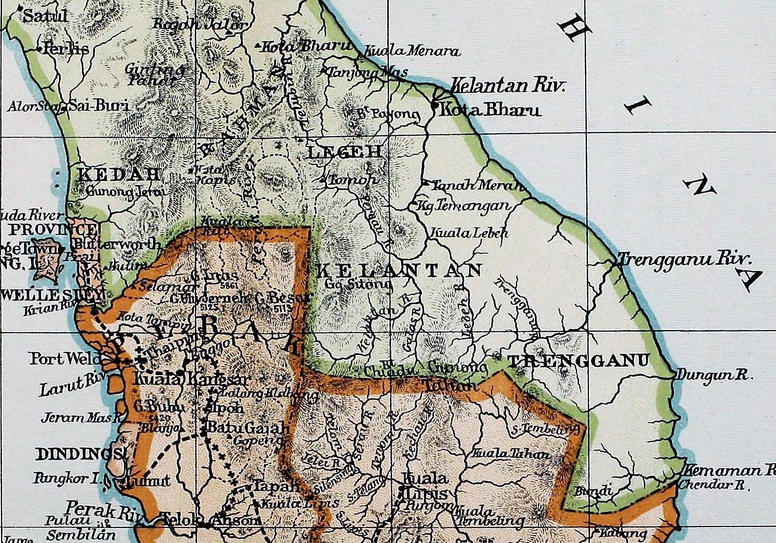
A 19th century map of Reman, showing the location in the interior of the upper Peninsula. A landlocked kingdom, it is surrounded by clockwise from north: the Malay states of Jala, Legeh, Perak and Kedah respectively. Kota Baru, the administrative capital of the kingdom can also be seen in the map.

The state of Reman was founded on territory carved out from the neighbouring principalities of Pujut, Jalor and Legeh, all part of the Patani Kingdom, in the early 19th century. It emerged as a single polity under Tuan Tok Nik Tok Leh in 1810. Tuan Tok Nik, also known as Tuan Mansor, a Patani nobleman, was appointed to manage the mining operations in the area during the reign of Sultan Muhammad Raja Bakar of Patani. In the late 18th century, he and his followers settled in the Kroh Plateau, an area that was receiving a mass exodus of people fleeing from the civil unrest in the Patani plains further north since the Siamese reconquest in 1785.

By 1808, Tuan Tok Nik, desiring for more political autonomy for the area, began his campaign for independence from Patani suzerainty. The campaign rapidly spiraled into a civil war. The Siamese, mobilised its forces to attack the Patani Kingdom as well. The Siamese emerged victorious, and the Patani Kingdom was severely weakened by the two-front incursion.

The Siamese subsequently reorganised Patani in 1810 into a confederation of 7 semi-autonomous chiefdoms. The chiefdoms consist of Legeh, Nongchick, Patani, Reman, Saiburi, Yala and Yaring. Each chiefdom was granted a high degree of autonomy and administrative powers were devolved to the Malay kings. A portion of local revenue was paid to the Siamese as tribute. Loyalty to the crown was observed and any rebellion against the Siamese was not tolerated.

Tuan Tok Nik was affirmed as the ruler of Reman. Spanning an area between the upper reach of Sungai Pattani to Sungai Mas in the north and Lenggong in the south, Reman was the largest state in the confederation.

=== The Perak-Reman War of 1826 ===
A territorial dispute between Reman and Perak led to conflict between the two states, primarily around what is today the towns of Klian Intan and Pengkalan Hulu in the Hulu Perak region. Previously a border outpost between Perak and Patani in the 18th century, the mineral-rich area was captured in 1790, becoming an integral part of the Reman state.

In 1826, Sultan Abdullah Muazzam Shah of Perak sought the assistance of the British East India Company to regain control of the resource-rich territory. Perakian forces were deployed to the plateau for their campaign into Reman. The King of Reman Tuan Mansor, withdrew his forces from Kubu Kapeh to Klian Intan and later to Kuala Kepayang. It took several years for Reman to reconquer the area.

=== Post-War recovery and growth ===
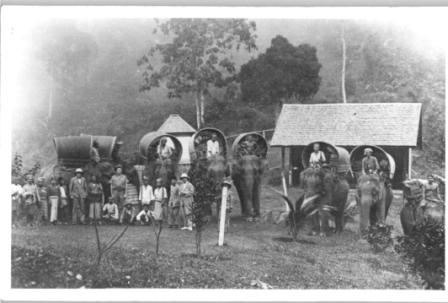
The Elephants of Gerik, taken in c. 1900. The Reman Kings were known to own hundreds of elephants, using the beast of burden as the primary workhorse both in the field and in military.

The kingdom's strategic location between the east and west coast of the peninsula fueled its growth throughout the 19th century. The border conflict with Perak was followed by a period of relative stability and unprecedented prosperity due to the restoration of mining activities in the region, under the auspices of Toh Nang Patani, a local noble. Though sporadic border skirmishes with Perak continued, they were usually won by Reman militia, commanded by Mengkong Deleha, a renowned Reman fighter.

Hostilities between Reman and Perak formally come to an end in 1882 when both parties sought to formalise the border. Under British mediation, both states agreed that the new border would be located along Bukit Nasha (5.3571123,101.0294051), some 11 kilometres (6.8 miles) southwest of Gerik town. Bukit Nasha, alternately Bukit Nak Sah (Nasha Hill) is an abbreviation of Nak disahkan satu perjanjian (for the ratification of a treaty).

The border was adjusted in 1899, when the border was shifted north to Kerunai, thus transferring Gerik town to the Federated Malay States, which Perak had become part of four years prior. Several boundary markers were erected, with each pillar standing 1 metre high and 1 metre wide.

=== Independence movement ===
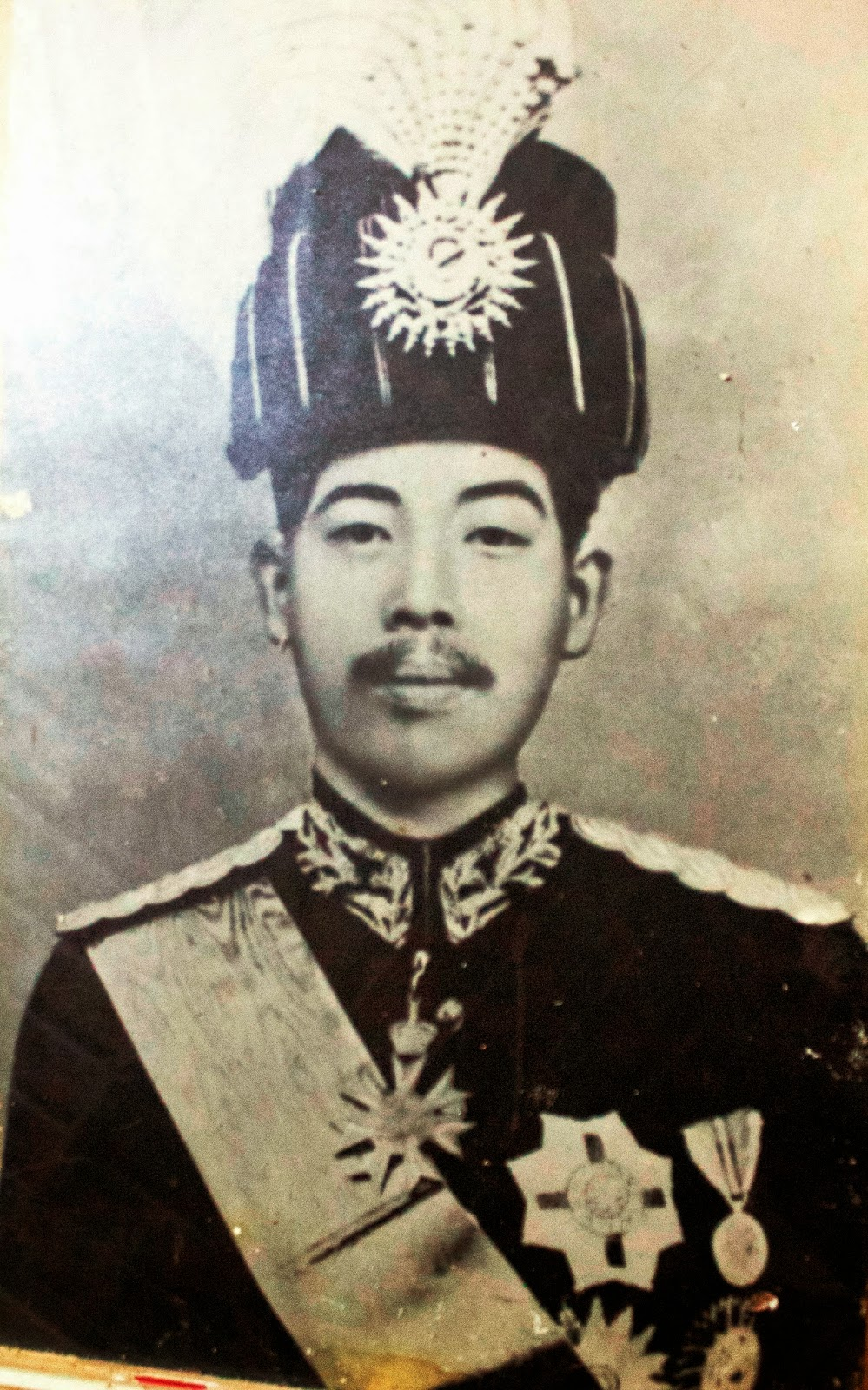
Tuan Lebeh, the Long Raya (crown prince) of Reman Kingdom. He was convicted after the allegations of an uprising against the Siamese rule in 1902.

The rise of nationalist movements in Reman was a result of wider Pan-Patani Malay nationalism in the region. It was a result of loss of local sovereignty to the Siamese in 1785. Nationalist movements in the area in the late 19th century called for a restoration of a sovereign Patani kingdom, hoping to protect native lands and interests without interference from the Siamese government.

In 1902, the Siamese, alarmed by the nationalist movements in the south, began a major military crackdown against the Malay leaders who were suspected of involvement. Among the political elite arrested by the Siamese forces were Tuan Lebeh Long Raya, the Raja Muda (crown prince) of Reman; Abdul Kadir Kamaruddin Syah, the Sultan of Patani and Tengku Abdul Mutallib, the King of Teluban.

=== Dissolution and annexation ===
Tuan Lebeh was then charged in the Siamese court in Singgora. The trial found the Raja Muda of Reman to be guilty of treason and was offered two sentence options: a 25 years imprisonment in Singgora or 20 years in Bangkok. Tuan Lebeh opted for the second sentence. He was then transferred to Bangkok via a Siamese vessel, Chamroen (Thai: จำเริญ). The ship sank during the voyage to Bangkok and the prince was believed have died in the disaster. The king was devastated by the news and died a few weeks later, without an heir apparent.

The same year also marked the beginning of Siamese moves to strip whatever was left of local autonomy in Patani. In 1906 Patani was once again reorganised into a monthon or division (Thai: มณฑลปัตตานี; RTGS: Monthon Pattani) and administered by a Siamese governor. The newly created division was then divided into three provinces – Pattani, Yala and Narathiwat, each headed by a high commissioner. Under the new system, Reman was absorbed into Yala province as Amphoe Yala.

=== Aftermath ===
"..Setul would not be of no great values to us, and although we might do doubt put forward a very good claim to its part of Kedah and secure it by insistence, I am inclined to think it would be more Politics to turn our claim to account by agreeing to renounce Setul if the Siamese Government will in its stead hand over to us the Lang-kawi Islands and that portion of Raman which comprise the watershed of the Perak River. Both these would constitute more velueable posessions to us than Setul. The Lang-kawi Islands furnish magnificent anchourages and such have been coveted by various foreign powers, whilst the lower part of Reman is rich in Tin"

— Ralph Paget, British Minister to Thailand, in his letter to Edward Grey, Secretaries of State for Foreign Affairs (29 April 1907)

Ignited by colonial ambitions, the British aimed to expand their territories in the far east. By the dawn of the 20th century, they had already acquired a collection of polities consisting of crown colonies and protectorates in the central and southern parts of the Malay Peninsula. Between 1786 and 1895 the British incorporated the areas into the Straits Settlements and the Federated Malay States respectively.

In 1909, alarmed by the growing ties between the German colonial powers and the Siamese, especially in the peninsula, the British sought to enter an agreement with the Siamese. The acquisition of the northern states was deemed essential for the British, as it was strategically located by the mouth of the Strait of Malacca and rich with tin, an important commodity for the Industrial Revolution and trade by the late 19th century. This led to the Anglo-Siamese Treaty of 1909 that split the peninsula between Siamese and British jurisdictions.

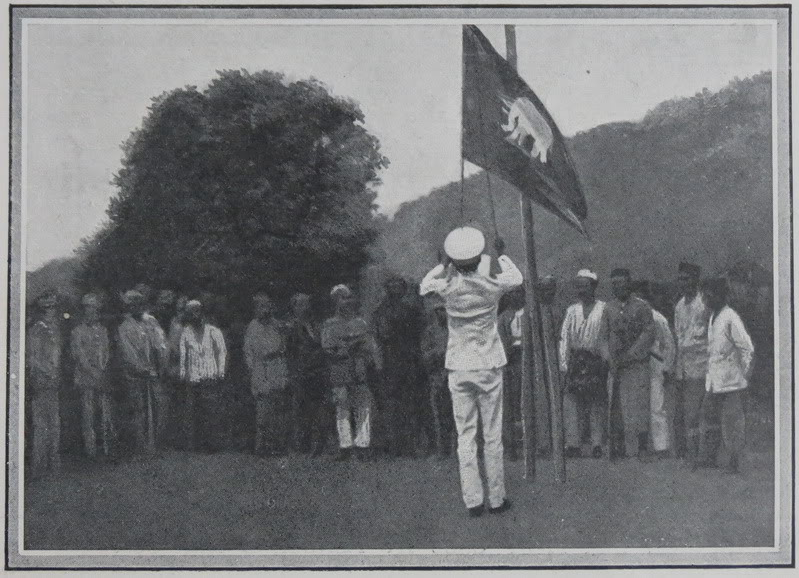
The flag of Siam was last lowered in Reman Hilir (southern Reman) on 16 July 1909, marking the end of the Siamese rule in the territory.

One of the prospective areas for British expansion included the Reman district, which had been absorbed into Yala province in 1906. The area was known to be rich in gold ore, as well as holding one of the largest tin reserves in the peninsula. During the discussion between the Siamese and the British, the British agreed to abandon its claims on Satun in exchange for the Langkawi archipelago and the Lower Reman region. The UK was also required to provide a loan to finance the construction of the south line of Siamese State Railway which cost £4 million pounds (1909).

=== Partition of the old kingdom, partial cession to the Federated Malay States ===
The 1909 treaty split the territory of the old kingdom into two jurisdictions. Reman Hulu in the north, remained within Siam, as an amphoe of Yala province, while Reman Hilir in the south, which included Kroh, was ceded to Perak in the Federated Malay States, as part of the Hulu Perak region. A cession ceremony was held on 16 July 1909 in Kroh. The ceremony was attended by: Wan Muhammad Isa, Orang Kaya Menteri; Wan Muhammad Salleh, Orang Kaya-Kaya Seri Adika Raja; E.W. Birch, the British Resident of Perak; A.S. Jelf, MCS, Assistant Secretary to British Resident of Perak; H. Berkeley, District Magistrate; G. Simpson, Police Inspector of Kuala Kangsar; J.D. Kemp, Manager of Rahman Hydrolic Tin Limited, Klian Intan and Keluong Wan Husain, a noble from Betong, Siam.

Wan Husain, as the Siamese plenipotentiary, announced the transfer of sovereignty from Siam to the United Kingdom. It was followed by a flag raising ceremony, symbolising the end of Siamese rule and beginning of Perak's sovereignty in the Lower Reman area.

== Rulers of Reman, 1810–1902 ==
Reman was ruled by Tuan Tok Nik Tok Leh – the founding father of Reman – and his descendants.

Raja (The King of) Reman	In office
Tuan Tok Nik Tok Leh/Tuan Mansur	1810–1836
DYMM Tuan Nik Ulu/Tuan Kundur	1849–1867
DYMM Tuan Timur	1867–1875
DYMM Tuan Jagung/Tengku Abdul Kandis	1875–1901

== Influence and legacy ==
Batang kenanga di tepi telaga,
Buat galah perahu Che Nyonya,
Seperti bunga di lengkar naga,
Carilah akal menyuntingnya.

Branches of Cananga, along the well,
Acted as an oar for Miss Nyonya,
Akin to a blossom, curled by a dragon,
Seek a way to win your desire.

— A pantun from Raja Andak to Tuan Tok Nik, 1826.

The Kingdom of Reman left a mark in Yala province and Hulu Perak District which had once form an integral domain of the kingdom. The areas are marked by a Patani-Reman influence, bound together with a common culture, language and heritage as a result from the emigration from the Patani lowlands during the Reman period.

There are several monuments to the Reman Kingdom. These include the Istana Singgah (The Visiting Palace), the palatial residence of the royal family in Lower Reman. It is credited as one of the best example of the traditional architecture in the kingdom. Located in Kampung Selarong, it was built in the late 19th century as a secondary palace away from the administrative centre of the kingdom in Kota Baru (in present-day Yala). The manor was once a fortress of Tuan Lebeh before he was being arrested by the Siamese authorities due to a suspected uprising plot for Patani independence. The final resting place of Permaisuri Cik Neng, the Queen of Reman is also located nearby the palatial grounds, her death in 1915 was widely believed due to her devastation after the demise of the crown prince. The residence is currently privately owned by the descendants of the Reman royal family.

The waves of migration from the plains of Patani also bought a strong Patani based linguistic heritage. The Reman dialect is largely based on Patani Malay, nonetheless it has incorporated various peculiar features that denotes influence from the Perakian and Kedahan Malay dialects. It constitute as a dialect continuum between the East and the West Coast Malay language. In Perak, the variant is also known locally as Longat Pattani Batu Kurau.

Various namesake of areas in Hulu Perak were derived from the Patani settlers in Reman, this includes Kroh (murky), a town that derives its name from the muddy reservoir built by the Reman settlers to clean the domesticated elephants owned by the king. The area was renamed as Pengkalan Hulu in 1985. While Gerik, a major settlement established in Reman during the rule of Tuan Jagong owes its name from "Gerit", an onomatopoeia for the sounds made by the Bamboo rat, a native rodent that can be found in abundance in area.

Reman heritage can be seen in local literature and folklore. Among the prominent literature composed during the Reman period was a pantun created by Tuan Tok Nik Tok Leh for Raja Andak, the wife of Dato’ Seri Lela, the commander of the Perakian troops during the Perak-Reman war of 1826. The pantun narrated the forbidden love between the two parties from the two rival sides of the war. Another prominent figure of Reman oral literature includes Mengkong Dehela, a local warrior, he is a central figure that largely credited with leading and defending Reman territories. Details of his epic battles are largely recorded in the local lore.

Another visible legacy of the Reman period includes batu tanda (boundary marker), built in 1899 under the agreement between Perak and Reman, it signifies the historical border between the two states. The pillars still standing today despite a major border reformation in 1909.

== Bibliography ==
- Amal Espraza (2017), Sejarah Dan Asal Usul Gerik, Perak
- Arkib Negara Malaysia, Penyerahan Daerah-Daerah Takluk Reman Kepada Perak, Arkib Negara Malaysia, archived from the original on 10 September 2019
- Boon, Raymond (2010), The Raja States (Muang), Ma-lai-sia lah
- Dewan Bahasa dan Pustaka, Legeh
- Dolasoh, DJ (2017), Istana kayu lebih 100 tahun, Harian Metro
- Hazuki. R (2017), Loghat Patani Batu Kurau Dimartabatkan Dalam Buku Keresing Kerenyeh
- Khairul (2017), Chapter 3: The Government of Pattani in the period of Decline, History of Pattani
- Khairul (2016), Tokoh-tokoh pejuang Melayu Pattani, Sejarah Kerajaan Melayu Pattani
- Muhd Nur Iman Ramli (1980), Raja Bersiung, Publishing House Sdn. Bhd., ISBN 978-967-411-909-6
- Orang Kelantan (2017), Legeh Dan Reman, Terpahat Dalam Sejarah Kelantan, archived from the original on 16 February 2019
- Rahul (2 January 2019), Pengkalan Hulu Dahulunya Ada Negeri Reman Yang Berdaulat
- Ruxton, Ian (2016), The Diaries of Sir Ernest Mason Satow, 1883-1888: A Diplomat In Siam, Japan, Britain and Elsewhere, Lulu.com, ISBN 978-136-546-2429
- Sembangkuala (2010), The state of Reman in Hulu Perak
- Thailand.org, Siam FLag - Reman, archived from the original on 26 August 2016
- Tiki Mambang (2016), Sejarah Itu Teladan: Asal Usul Reman
- Tongkat Ali (2010), Negeri Rahman, hilangnya sebutir permata, archived from the original on 19 August 2011
- Thamsook Numnoncla (1971), The First American Advisers in Thai History (PDF)
- Utusan Malaysia (1998), Perang saudara di Hulu Perak, archived from the original on 15 October 2017
