= Malaysia Federal Route 77 =

Road in Malaysia

Federal Route 77
- Jalan Kroh

Route information
- Maintained by Malaysian Public Works Department
- Length: 6.16 km (3.83 mi)

Major junctions
- North end: Keroh
- FT 76 Federal Route 76; FT 1157 Jalan Lepang Nering; Hwy 410 Pattani–Betong Highway (Thailand)
- South end: Pengkalan Hulu

Location
- Country: Malaysia
- Primary destinations: Baling, Gerik, Betong (Thailand)

Highway system
- Highways in Malaysia; Expressways; Federal; State

Federal Route 77, or Jalan Kroh, is a federal road in Perak, Malaysia. The roads connects Pengkalan Hulu town until Pengkalan Hulu Checkpoint of the Malaysia–Thailand border. It is a main route to Betong, the southern gateway of Thailand.

== Route background ==
The Kilometre Zero of the Federal Route 77 starts at the Malaysia-Thailand border near Pengkalan Hulu Checkpoint, Perak.

== History ==
This road has a notable history especially during World War II and the Communist insurgency in Malaysia (1968–89).

=== Battle of Malaya (1941-1942) ===
The Federal Route 77 became a main route for Japanese Imperial forces from Pattani to Singapore during the Battle of Malaya between 1941 and 1942.

=== Communist insurgency in Malaysia (1968–1989) ===
On 17 June 1968, to mark the 20th anniversary of their armed struggle against the Malaysian Government, the Communist Party of Malaya (CPM) launched an ambush against security forces in the area of Kroh–Betong road not far between Pengkalan Hulu town and Malaysia–Thailand border. They achieved a major success, killing 17 members of the security forces. This event marked the start of the second armed revolt of the Communist Party of Malaya known as Communist insurgency in Malaysia (1968–89). The Federal Route 77 was put under strict security control by Malaysian army. Motorists were allowed to use the road at daytime only due to security reasons. The military control of the road was lifted after the insurgency ended in 1989.

== Features ==
At most sections, the Federal Route 77 was built under the JKR R5 road standard, allowing maximum speed limit of up to 90 km/h.

== Junction lists ==
The entire route is located in Pengkalan Hulu sub-district, Hulu Perak District, Perak.

Legend:

- I/C - Interchange, I/S - Intersection, RSA - Rest and service area, OBR - Overhead bridge restaurant, R/R - Restaurant and rest plaza, L/B - Layby, V/P - Vista point, TN - tunnel, T/P - Toll plaza, BR - Bridge
- C - Cloverleaf, S - Stack, T-A - Trumpet-A, T-B - Trumpet-B, DT - Directional-T/Y, SDT - Semi-Directional-T/Y, P-Y - Partial-Y, D - Diamond, P-C - Partial cloverleaf, D-D - Diverging diamond, D-R - Direct ramp

Location	km	mi	Name	Destinations	Notes
Pengkalan Hulu			ASEAN Malaysia–Thailand border Through to Hwy 410 (Pattani–Betong Highway)		
Pengkalan Hulu	0.0	0.0	Zon Duty Free Shopping Complex		
Pengkalan Hulu			Pengkalan Hulu Checkpoint		
Pengkalan Hulu	1.0	0.62	Pengkalan Hulu Checkpoint Rest and Service Area		
Pengkalan Hulu			Kroh-Betong insurgency battle site Historical site		
Pengkalan Hulu			Operation Krohcol battle site Historical site		
Pengkalan Hulu			Anti-Smuggling Unit (UPP) checkpoint		
Pengkalan Hulu			Ayer Panas	FT 1157 Jalan Lepang Nering – Gerik	T-junctions
Pengkalan Hulu			Kampung Bukit Serdang		
Pengkalan Hulu			Sungai Kuak bridge		
Pengkalan Hulu			Jalan Kuak Luar	A173 Jalan Kuak Luar – Kampung Kuak Luar, Baling	T-junctions
Pengkalan Hulu			Sungai Keroh bridge		
Pengkalan Hulu			Taman Bukit Riah		
Pengkalan Hulu			Malaysian Public Works Department (JKR) Hulu Perak, Pengkalan Hulu Sub-District Branch Office		
Pengkalan Hulu			Taman Kroh Indah		
Pengkalan Hulu			Pengkalan Hulu; Taman Sri Jaya		
Pengkalan Hulu			Pengkalan Hulu; Taman Bersatu		
Pengkalan Hulu	6.0	3.7	Pengkalan Hulu		
Pengkalan Hulu	6.1	3.8	Pengkalan Hulu	FT 76 Malaysia Federal Route 76 – Baling, Sik, Kulim, Sungai Petani, Gerik, Kota Bharu, Lenggong, Kuala Kangsar; A172 Jalan Tasek – Kampung Baru Tasek	Junctions
1.000 mi = 1.609 km; 1.000 km = 0.621 mi: Route transition
