= Battle of Slim River =

Battle of the Malayan Campaign in World War II

- Part of the Malayan campaign, World War II
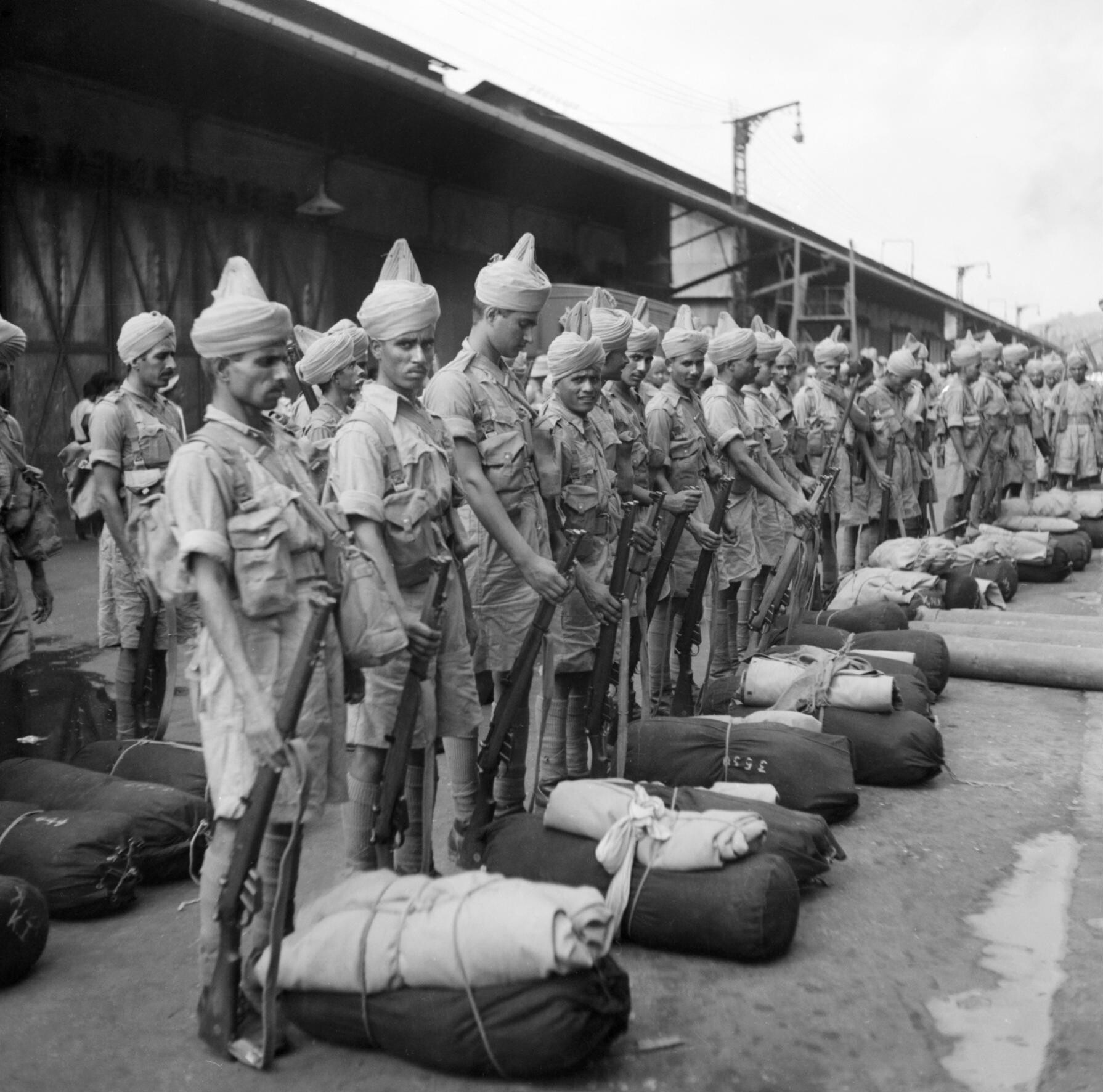
- Indian troops in Singapore, November 1941.
Date	5–7 January 1942
Location	Slim River, British Malaya
Result	Japanese victory

Belligerents
British India	Empire of Japan

Commanders and leaders
(United Kingdom) Brig. Archibald Paris	(Empire of Japan) Lt. Gen Takuro Matsui

Units involved
(British Raj) 11th Indian Division; (India) 12th Indian Brigade; (India) 28th Indian Brigade; (India) 15th Indian Brigade; (India) 155th Field Artillery Regiment	(Empire of Japan) 5th Division; (Empire of Japan) 41st Infantry Regiment; (Empire of Japan) 6th Tank Regiment

Casualties and losses
500 killed 3,200 captured (Japanese estimate)	77 killed 60 wounded (Japanese estimate) 4 tanks destroyed 1 tank damaged

The Battle of Slim River occurred during the Malayan campaign in January 1942 between the Imperial Japanese Army and the British Indian Army on the west coast of Malaya.

== Background ==
Japanese forces had invaded north-west Malaya from southern Thailand on 11 December 1941 and eastern Malaya on 7 December at Kota Bharu. From Thailand they had driven relentlessly down the western coast of Malaya defeating all British attempts at stopping them. By Christmas Day the Japanese held all of north-west Malaya. One of the few moments where British troops managed to inflict any form of effective defense against Japanese tactics occurred near Kampar on the Dipang River. At the Battle of Kampar, in a four-day battle notable for the effectiveness of the British artillery, the Japanese suffered heavy casualties. By 2 January, though, the Indian 11th Infantry Division was out flanked by seaborne landings south of the Kampar position, out numbered and with Japanese forces attempting to cut the division off from the road to Singapore, they withdrew to prepared positions at Trolak five miles north of the Slim River.

=== British positions at Trolak ===
The defenses on the road to Trolak started with a four-mile corridor at the 60 mile post extending through almost impenetrable jungle to the 64 mile post, after the village the road cuts through the more open terrain of the Cluny Rubber estate for five miles before reaching the Slim River rail bridge. The road then bends east and follows the river upstream for another six miles before it crosses the Slim River at a road bridge. The British commander, Acting Major-General Paris (normally commander of the 12th Indian Infantry Brigade), had lost one of his three brigades after the fighting at Kampar; the amalgamated 5/16 Brigade, after retreating through the 12th Brigade, had been moved to a coastal defense position further south to defend the western flank of the division and to rest and reorganise. This left Paris with Lt. Col. Ian Stewart's 12th Indian Brigade and Lt. Col. Ray Selby's 28th Gurkha Brigade, both at reduced strengths due to heavy casualties in the earlier battles at Kampar and on the Grik Road, to defend the northern bank of the river.

Stewart's battalions were in a line straddling either side of the road and spreading back through the thick jungle part of the corridor to north of Trolak where the Cluny Rubber estate started and where Stewart placed his Headquarters. The 4/19th Hyderabad Regiment held the forward position with anti-tank obstacles and road blocks. The next and last prepared positions were held by the 5/2nd Punjab Regiment. The 2nd Argyll and Sutherland Highlanders were grouped in a defensive position but without fixed anti-tank obstacles or road blocks. Selby's Gurkhas were spread along the road and railway leading up to both bridges, which had been prepared for demolition.

=== The Japanese attacking force ===
The Japanese attacking force came from Colonel Ando's battle group (mainly from the 42nd Infantry Regiment) which had taken over from the chastened Okabe Regiment (41st Infantry Regiment) which had suffered heavy casualties in the artillery ambush at Kampar, both units were from the 5th Division . The assault force consisted of about 17 Type 97 medium tanks and 3 Type 95 Ha-Go Light Tanks, under the command of Major Toyosaku Shimada (ja:島田豊作). Shimada came up with the plan, unusual in World War II, of a night attack using tanks to spearhead the infantry, a dangerous proposition for tanks considering the extremely low visibility factor which would hamper their crews.

== Battle ==
On the afternoon of 5 January 1942 the rearguard from the 5th/16th Brigade withdrew through the 12th Brigade positions. Soon afterwards the advance guard from Colonel Ando's 42nd Regiment reached the Hyderabad positions and launched a probing attack which was beaten off with the loss of 60 Japanese dead. Ando decided to hold and wait for armor support before launching another attack. On 6 January Major Shimada's tank company arrived and Shimada begged Ando to allow him to attack straight down the road, instead of following the usual Japanese tactics of flanking the British positions.

=== 12th Brigade positions ===
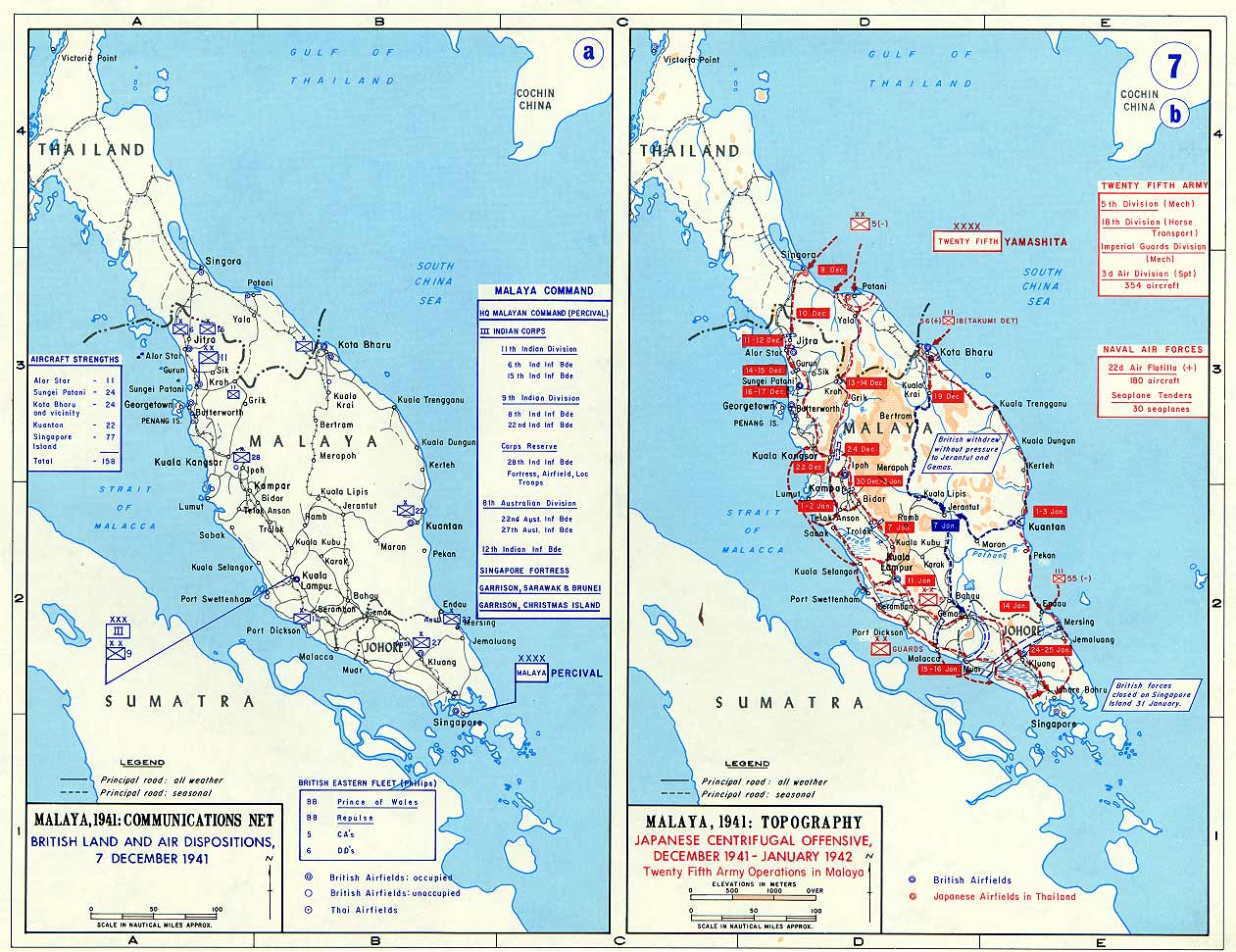
Maps of the Malayan campaign.

At 3.30 am on 7 January 1942, in heavy rain, Shimada's force started a mortar and artillery bombardment on the first of the British positions (occupied by the 4/19th Hyderabad Regiment under Major Alan Davidson Brown, the Hyderabads' commanding officer, Lt. Col. Eric Wilson-Haffenden, had been wounded in an air attack earlier). The tanks began manoeuvering through the British defensive obstacles under fire from the Hyderabads, who were able to call in some artillery fire, which destroyed one tank. The Hyderabads lost contact with their artillery support and without any anti-tank weapons to defend against the Japanese tanks, Ando's infantry from his 3rd Battalion, 42nd Regiment, were able to force a breach in the Hyderabads' roadblock. Within fifteen minutes Japanese engineers were dismantling the road block and Ando's infantry were pushing back the Hyderabads who were now reduced to scattered groups. The infantry were immediately followed by Shimada's tanks, which easily broke through the remaining Hyderabads, scattering them into the jungle and by 4 am were headed toward the next British unit.

A few Hyderabads fell back to the next battalion (Lt. Col. (Charles) Cecil Deakin's 5/2nd Punjab Regiment) alerting the Punjabis to the tanks heading towards their position. Shimada lost his two leading tanks to land mines and Boys anti-tank rifles in front of the more experienced Punjabi position. The Punjabis then managed to set fire to another tank with Molotov cocktails, effectively blocking the road and leaving the Japanese column stacked up, almost bumper to bumper. If the British artillery (who were not contacted due to the communication lines being cut) had been called in at this point in the battle, Shimada's column could have been easily stopped due to their stacked up and vulnerable position, surrounded by thick jungle on the narrow road. This golden opportunity for the British was lost and Shimada's infantry were able to push through Deakin's Punjabis, while the tanks found an unguarded loop road that enabled them to bypass the destroyed tanks. The Punjabis had held Shimada until around 6 am in heavy fighting. Deakin and a handful of his remaining Punjabis managed to escape across the Slim River, but most of his battalion were mopped up by the 42nd Regiment.

By 6.30 am, Shimada's tanks were approaching the next battalion, the 2nd Bn, Argyll and Sutherland Highlanders under Lt. Col. Lindsay Robertson. The 2nd Argylls were positioned around the village of Trolak itself and protected Stewart's 12th Brigade H.Q. This was a regular British Army battalion and very experienced, considered to be one of the best jungle fighting units the British had in Malaya. The Argylls were in a defensive position but without fixed anti-tank obstacles or mines. They had only a little warning of the rapidly approaching Japanese, thanks to the arrival of a few panic-stricken sepoys from the Hyderabads to erect a roadblock. Even with that warning, the first four of Shimada's tanks were mistaken for Punjab Bren Carriers and drove straight through the Argylls, neatly dividing the battalion. These four tanks then headed for the railway bridge. The arrival of the remainder of Shimada's main force and Ando's infantry soon after split the Argylls completely and cut them off from the road. The Argylls were reduced to many small groups, but they fought ferociously and managed to delay the Japanese infantry longer than either of the other two battalions, holding them up until about 7.30 am. The force east of the road (C and B Companies) under Col. Robertson fought their way into the rubber estate and tried to flank the Japanese advance by heading south through the jungle inland and breaking up into small parties. Six weeks later some of these soldiers would still be in the jungle. A company commanded by Lt. Donald Napier (a descendant of British General Charles Napier), west of the road, managed to break out of the encircling Japanese and cross the river before the rail bridge was blown. D Company, further north than Napier's company, suffered the same fate as Robertson's party of Argylls, having to scatter into the jungle and attempt to reach British lines. Most of D Company would be captured before they could reach the river. Only 94 Argylls answered roll call on 8 January, nearly all from Napier's A Company.

=== Atrocities ===
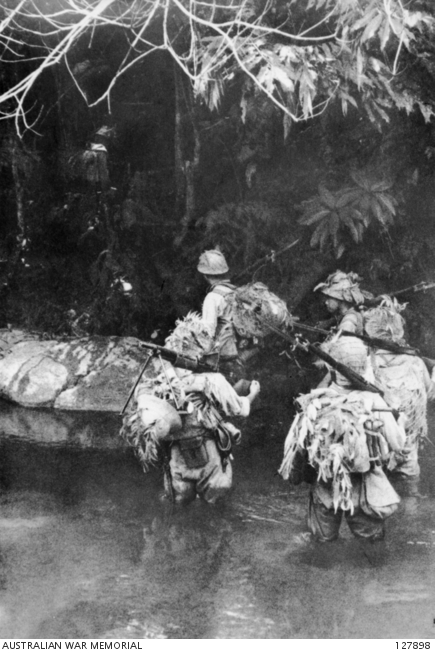
Japanese troops crossing a jungle stream.

An instance of a Japanese atrocity was committed in the area of the rubber trees around Trolak. In this area were a number of Argyll and Hyderabad wounded. 2nd Lieutenant Ian Primrose reports that after he regained consciousness from an injury during the fighting he discovered that the Japanese were dividing the wounded into those who said they could walk and those who said they could not. Primrose decided he could walk, which was fortunate as the Japanese soldiers proceeded to shoot and bayonet the wounded who could not. Afterward the survivors were forced to dig graves for the dead and then told to carry the Japanese wounded.

=== The 28th Brigade positions ===
Before reaching the 28th Gurkha Brigade Shimada's tanks were offered a perfect target in the form of Lt. Col. Cyril Livesy Lawrence Stokes' 5/14th Punjabis, who were in marching order (long columns of units following each other) on either side of the road to Trolak. Stokes' Punjabis were heading up to reinforce Stewart's brigade. Commanding Shimada's three leading tanks was Lt. Sadanobu Watanabe, who led his tanks straight through Stokes' Punjabis, machine guns firing at the perfect target offered by the lined up soldiers. Lt. Col. Stokes was injured on 7 January 1942 when he and Major Lewis were attacked by tanks when advancing to the front line. Lt. Col. Stokes died in captivity on 15 February 1942. His battalion suffered heavy casualties before Watanabe's tanks carried on toward the road bridge (5/14th Punjabis mustered 146 officers and soldiers by 8 January). By 8:00 a.m. the leading Japanese tanks were within Selby's brigade H.Q. area. The 28th Brigade were completely unaware of what had happened to Stewart's entire brigade and the Japanese tore through them faster, scattering both the 2/2nd and 2/9th Gurkhas, which were spread around Selby's brigade H.Q. Although they suffered heavy casualties many of the soldiers from these two battalions made it across the rail bridge before the main Japanese force got to their position.

Like the Punjabis, the last battalion of Selby's brigade, the 2/1st Gurkhas under Lt. Col. Jack Oswald Fulton, were on the march either side of the road as the Japanese tanks reached them. This time though, the marching column of Gurkhas were facing away from the approaching Japanese, and Watanabe's tanks caught them from behind: the death toll was even higher than that of the Punjabis. One officer and twenty-seven other ranks answered roll call the next day. Fulton, wounded in the stomach and taken prisoner, would die in captivity two months later.

=== The bridges ===
Shimada's tanks had by now broken through both brigades and were into the rear area of the 11th Indian Division, heading for the two bridges. Leaving the rail bridge for Shimada and the main Japanese force, Lt Watanabe headed toward the more important road bridge six miles away. In this attack Watanabe broke through the artillery, medical, and other support units in front of the road bridge. Two British artillery colonels were surprised and killed while driving on the road in this lightning attack. Upon reaching the road bridge at 8.30 a.m. Watanabe found it defended by a battery of Bofors 40mm anti-aircraft guns from the Singapore and Hong Kong Artillery Regiment. Although two of the guns managed to lower their barrels quickly enough to fire on the tanks, the rounds did not damage the tanks' armor and the gunners fled. Watanabe himself cut the wires to the demolition charges on the bridge with his sword. It was still only early morning and the Japanese attack had managed to scatter the entire 11th Indian Division, leaving most of its survivors attempting to escape across the Slim River.

In the last part of this 25 kilometre (16 mile) Blitzkrieg-like attack, Watanabe, now in control of the road bridge, sent a force of three tanks under the command of Ensign Toichero Sato to explore the other side of the river. Sato travelled 4 km (3 miles) before encountering more British artillery, in the form of two 4.5 inch Howitzers from the 155th Field Artillery Regiment, RA. Sato's tank opened fire on the first gun, turning it over and blocking the road. The gunners from the second gun managed to lower their barrels in time to fire on the tanks at point blank range. Sato's tank was hit and destroyed, killing him, and forcing the other two tanks in his force to retreat back to the road bridge.

== Aftermath ==
It seems that even some of the British, who had suffered so badly in this battle, were impressed by the attack. Lt. Col. Arthur Harrison, a British artillery commander who had narrowly escaped being killed by Watanabe's tank, remarked with obvious admiration;

Heedless of danger and of their isolation they had shattered the division: they had captured the Slim Bridge by their reckless and gallant determination.

Lt. Col. Stewart, when writing to the official historian after the war, said of the battle;

I am rightly criticised for the location of Brigade Headquarters, and for not using the Field Artillery in an anti-tank role...It is no excuse, but I had never taken part in an exercise embodying a coordinated anti-tank defence or this type of attack. The use of tanks on a road at night was a surprise.

The 11th Indian Infantry Division had suffered huge casualties, although some would eventually make their way back to join in the fight for Singapore, many more would still be in the jungle after the surrender. Large numbers of these survivors would be captured but a few, like Lt. Col. Lindsay Robertson (who had strong views about surrendering) and his party of Argylls attempted to evade capture, but were unable to keep ahead of the rapid advance of the Japanese. Robertson was killed on 20 January 1942. The remaining survivors from the two brigades were scattered all over the Malayan Peninsula. Some of the Argylls were still at large by August 1945. A Gurkha NCO, Naik Nakam Gurung, was found during the Malayan Emergency in October 1949, he had been living in the jungle since 1942. The 12th Indian Brigade had practically ceased to exist and the 28th Brigade was but a shadow.

Stewart's 12th Brigade could muster no more than 430 officers and men, with 94 officers and men from the Argylls. Selby's brigade was slightly better off with 750 answering roll call the next day. In all the 11th Division lost an estimated 3,200 troops and a large amount of irreplaceable equipment. The Japanese had managed to attack through a division along nineteen miles and take two bridges at minimal cost to themselves all before lunch time. General Wavell, after meeting survivors of the battle, was appalled by the condition they were in and ordered the 11th Indian Division out of the front line. This defeat for the British allowed the Japanese to take Kuala Lumpur unopposed, Wavell ordered Percival to retreat into southern Malaya, giving up central Malaya, and then to allow the Australian 8th Division an opportunity to prove itself against the Japanese Army.

The devastation caused by this short battle also resulted in Lieutenant-General Percival changing his tactics of defensive prepared positions and ordering a rapid retreat to the south, where an ambush would be prepared at Gemensah Bridge by the Australians.

== See also ==
- Battle of Malaya
- Japanese Invasion of Malaya
- Japanese Invasion of Thailand
- Battle of Jitra
- Battle of Muar
- Battle of Singapore
- Greater East Asia War in the Pacific
- Malaya Command - Order of Battle
- Japanese Order of Battle, Malayan Campaign
- Operation Krohcol
- Operation Matador
- Pacific War

== Footnotes ==
=== Books ===
- Colin Smith (2006). Singapore Burning. England: Penguin Books. ISBN 978-0-14-101036-6.
- Alan Warren (2006). Britain's Greatest Defeat-Singapore 1942. Continuum International Publishing Group. ISBN 1-85285-597-5.
- Alan Jeffreys, Duncan Anderson (2005). British Army in the Far East 1941-45. Osprey Publishing. ISBN 1-84176-790-5.
