= Perak State Route A172 =

Road in Malaysia

Perak Route 172
- Jalan Tasek

Major junctions
- North end: Pengkalan Hulu
- South end: Kampung Baru Tasek

Location
- Country: Malaysia
- Primary destinations: FT 76 Federal route 76; FT 77 Federal route 77

Highway system
- Highways in Malaysia; Expressways; Federal; State

Jalan Tasek (Perak State Route A172) is a major road in Perak which is one of the 13 states of Malaysia. “Jalan” means “road” in the Malay language, and “Tasek” means “lake”.

== List of junctions and towns ==
| km | Exit | Junctions | To | Remarks |
|---|---|---|---|---|
| | | Pengkalan Hulu | North; FT 77Keroh; 4106Betong (Thailand) West; FT 76Baling; K10 Sik; FT 67Kulim; FT 67Sungai Petani Southeast; FT 76Gerik; FT 4Kota Bharu; FT 76Lenggong; FT 76Kuala Kangsar | Junctions |
| | | Kampung Selarong | | |
| | | Kampung Baru Tasek | | |
