= Kota Baru =

Kota Baru may refer to:

== Places ==
- Kota Bharu, capital of the state of Kelantan, Malaysia
- Kota Baru, Thailand, a sub-district (tambon) in Raman District, Yala Province, Thailand
- Kota Baru Parahyangan, a planned city located at Padalarang, West Bandung Regency in Indonesia.
- former name of Jayapura, capital of the province of Papua, Indonesia
