= Pattani–Betong Highway =

Road in Southeastern Thailand

National Highway 410
- ทางหลวงแผ่นดินหมายเลข 410
- ถนนยะรัง; ถนนสิโรรส; ถนนสุขยางค์ Thanon Yarang; Thanon Sirorot; Thanon Sukhyang
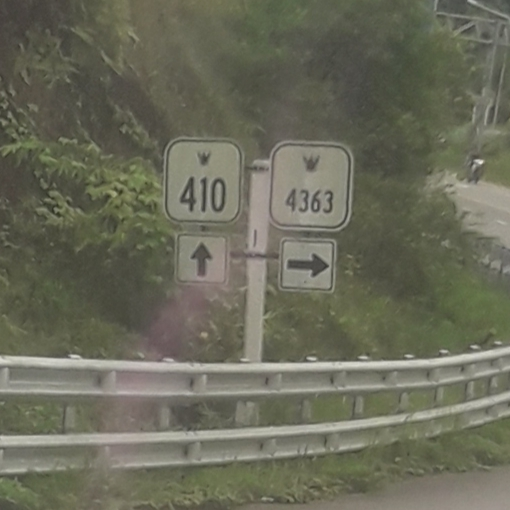
- Highway 410 in Khoyae Intersection, Yala Province

Route information
- Length: 159.892 km (99.352 mi)

Major junctions
- North end: Hwy 42 / AH18 in Pattani
- Hwy 43 in Mueang Pattani District; Hwy 409 in Mueang Yala District
- South end: FT 77 Federal Route 77 in Betong

Location
- Country: Thailand
- Major cities: Yarang, Yala, Bannang Sata

Highway system
- Highways in Thailand; Motorways; Asian Highways

The Pattani–Betong Highway (Thai: ทางหลวงแผ่นดินสายปัตตานี-เบตง, Thang Luang Phaendin Sai Pattani–Betong) or Highway 410 (Thai: ทางหลวงแผ่นดินหมายเลข 410) is a major highway in Yala Province and Pattani Province of Thailand. The highway becomes Malaysia Federal Route 77 at the Thailand-Malaysia border.

== History ==
Highway 410 consists of 3 roads: 1. Yarang Road, which was formerly known as Pattani Main Entrance. 2. Sirorot Road, which was formerly known as Pattani–Yala Highway It was named as such on December 10, 1950, when Field Marshal P. Pibulsongkram was Prime Minister. In honor of Mr. Subin Sirorot, the district technician and 2. Sukhyang Road , which was formerly known as Yala–Betong Highway It was named that same day. In honor of Phraya Sarasat Sirilak (Sarasat Sirilak Sukyang), a former engineering engineer.

== Junction lists ==
Legend:

- I/C - Interchange, I/S - Intersection, RSA - Rest and service area, OBR - Overhead bridge restaurant, R/R - Restaurant and rest plaza, L/B - Layby, V/P - Vista point, TN - tunnel, T/P - Toll plaza, BR - Bridge
- C - Cloverleaf, S - Stack, T-A - Trumpet-A, T-B - Trumpet-B, DT - Directional-T/Y, SDT - Semi-Directional-T/Y, P-Y - Partial-Y, D - Diamond, P-C - Partial cloverleaf, D-D - Diverging diamond, D-R - Direct ramp

Province	District	Section	Km	Exit	Name	Destinations	Notes
Pattani	Mueang Pattani	Sirorot Road	2+560		Pattani	Yarang Road – Chabangtiko, Anoru; Hwy 42 / AH18 – Bangkok, Songkhla, Hatyai, Nongchik, Yaring, Narathiwat, Su-ngai Kolok, Rantau Panjang (Malaysia)	Junctions
Pattani	Mueang Pattani	Sirorot Road	7+5XX		Baraho	Hwy 43 – Bangkok, Nongchik, Songkhla, Hatyai, Yarang, Yaring, Narathiwat	Roundabout
Pattani	Yarang	Sirorot Road	15+11		Yarang	PN.2007 – Nongchik, Ban Bo Thong; Hwy 4061 – Mayo, Panare, Narathiwat	Junctions
Pattani	Yarang	Sirorot Road			Momawi	YL.T.1207 – Pattani Dam, Thasap; PN.3057 – Mayo	Junctions
Pattani	Yarang	Sirorot Road			Khaotum	PN.3054 – Ban Srong, Fatoni University, Ban Laewe	T-junctions
Yala	Mueang Yala	Sirorot Road	36+xxx		Sateng	Hwy 4082 (Withunutit Road) – Sateng Nok, Wang Phaya, Raman	T-junctions
Yala	Mueang Yala	Sirorot Road			Mueang Yala train crossing		
Yala	Mueang Yala	Sirorot Road	3x+xxx		YALA	Hwy 409 (Thesban Road 1) – Ban Niang, Khok Pho, Naket; Sirorot Road – Ban Thasap, Sateng Nok	Junctions
Yala	Mueang Yala	Thesaban 1 Road, Sukhyang Road	40+365		Melayu Bangkok I/S; Sateng Nok	Sai 15 Road – Ban Thasap, Sateng; YL.T.1-0040; Sukhyang Road – Ban Melayu Bangkok, Krong Pinang	Junctions
Yala	Mueang Yala	Thesaban 1 Road, Sukhyang Road	42+500		Budi	Hwy 4063 – Ban Kotabaru, Raman, Narathiwat	T-junctions
Yala	Krong Pinang	Sukhyang Road	55+xxx		Krong Pinang	YL.3015 – Sa-e, Patae, Yaha	T-junctions
Yala	Bannang Sata	Sukhyang Road	68+xxx		Taling Chan	Hwy 4273 – Si Sakhon, Narathiwat	t-junctions
Yala	Bannang Sata	Sukhyang Road			Yilapan Bridge (Pattani River crossing)		
Yala	Bannang Sata	Sukhyang Road	75+020		Bannang Sata	Hwy 4077 – Patae, Yaha, Songkhla; Thesban Road 4 – Bacho	Junctions
Yala	Bannang Sata	Sukhyang Road	76+250		Ban Taopun	YL.3009 – Bang Lang Dam	T-junctions
Yala	Than To	Sukhyang Road	96+xxx		Than To		
Yala	Than To	Sukhyang Road	110+9xx		Khoyae	Hwy 4363 (Sukhyang Road) – Mae Wat	T-junctions
Yala	Than To	Mae Wat Bypass Road			Tokkuchae Bridge (Lake Bang Lang)		
Yala	Than To	Mae Wat Bypass Road	112+xxx		Kato	Hwy 4363 (Sukhyang Road) – Mae Wat	T-junctions
Yala	Betong	Sukhyang Road	147+xxx		Tano Maero	Hwy 4326 – Yarom, Betong International Airport, Betong	T-junctions
Yala	Betong	Sukhyang Road	159+892		Terminus		
Yala	Betong	Sukhyang Road	163+XXX (original)		Betong	Hwy 4326 – Yarom, Betong International Airport, Than To; Amornrit Road – Ban Batae Tu-ngae	Roundabout
Yala	Betong	Sukhyang Road	16x+xxx		Kapaehulu	Hwy 4244 – Ban Saho	T-junctions
Yala	Betong	Sukhyang Road			Betong Checkpoint	Customs Immigration Immigration Customs	Crossing
ASEAN Thailand–Malaysia Border; Through to FT 77 Malaysia Federal Route 77
