= Highway 4061 (Thailand) =

Highway in Southeastern Thailand

National Highway 4061
- ทางหลวงแผ่นดินหมายเลข 4061
- ถนนลำใย 2 Thanon Lamyai 2

Route information
- Length: 36.842 km (22.893 mi)

Major junctions
- West end: Hwy 410 in Yarang
- Hwy 4092 in Mayo; Hwy 42 / AH18 in Mayo–Panare; Hwy 4075 in Panare
- North end: Hwy 4157 / Hwy 4324 in Panare

Location
- Country: Thailand
- Provinces: Pattani Province
- Major cities: Yarang, Mayo, Panare

Highway system
- Highways in Thailand; Motorways; Asian Highways

Route 4061 (Thai: ทางหลวงแผ่นดินหมายเลข 4061), known as Yarang–Panare Highway (Thai: ทางหลวงแผ่นดินสายยะรัง–ปะนาเระ) or Lamyai 2 Road (Thai: ถนนลำใย 2), is a major highway in middle Pattani province that connects from Yarang throughout Mayo to Panare.

== Route description ==
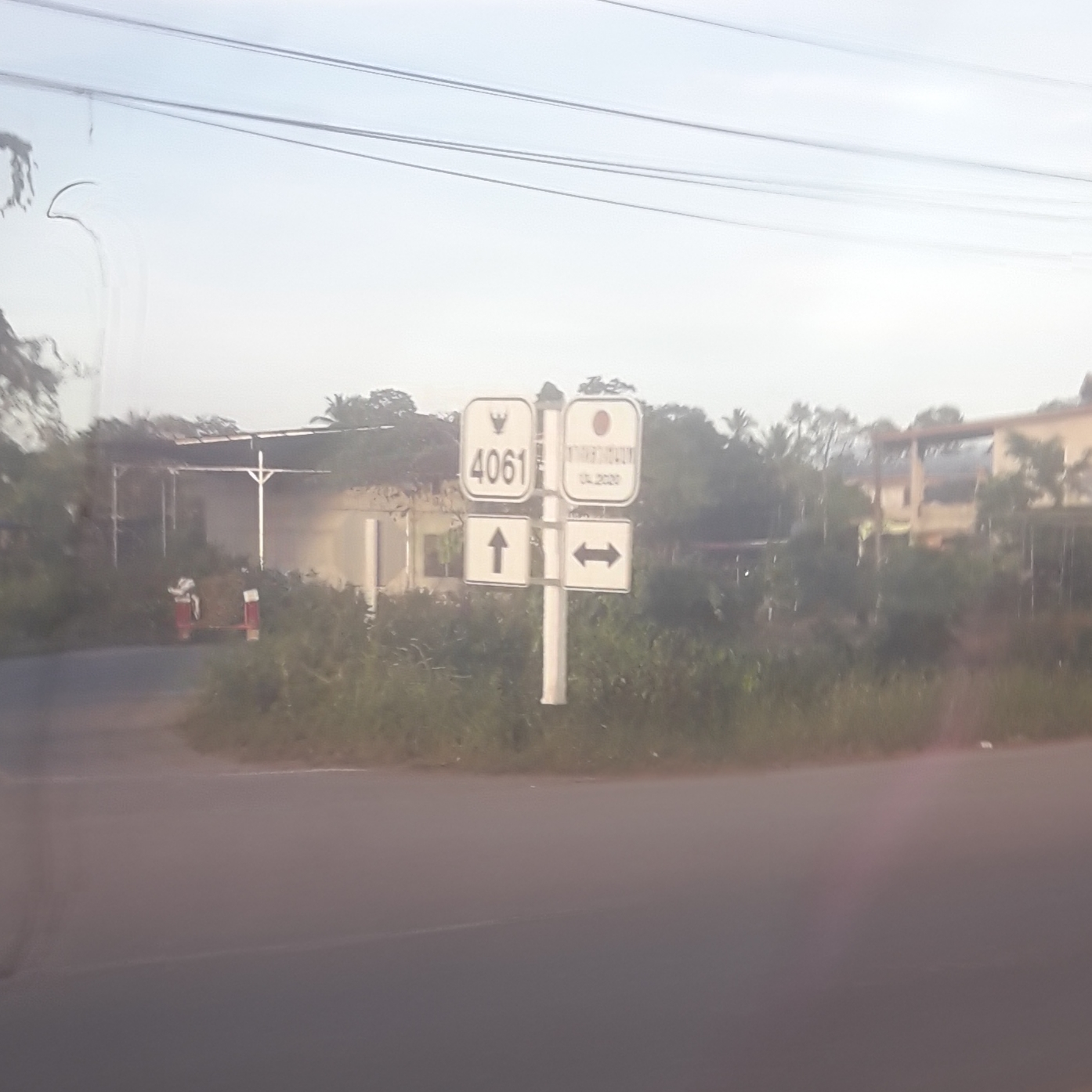
Highway 4061 in Mayo, Pattani Province

Highway 4061 is secondary main route in Pattani Province. The highway begins in Yarang intersection, Pattani Province. The highway has two to four traffic lanes, heading east through Mayo then heading north to its terminus in Panare. In Yarang district, it is five kilometres (3.1 mi). In Mayo district, it is 18 kilometres (11 mi). In Panare district, it is 13 kilometres (8.1 mi).

== List of junctions and towns ==
The entire route is located in Pattani province. Legend:

- I/C - Interchange, I/S - Intersection, RSA - Rest and service area, OBR - Overhead bridge restaurant, R/R - Restaurant and rest plaza, L/B - Layby, V/P - Vista point, TN - tunnel, T/P - Toll plaza, BR - Bridge
- C - Cloverleaf, S - Stack, T-A - Trumpet-A, T-B - Trumpet-B, DT - Directional-T/Y, SDT - Semi-Directional-T/Y, P-Y - Partial-Y, D - Diamond, P-C - Partial cloverleaf, D-D - Diverging diamond, D-R - Direct ramp

District	Section	Km	Exit	Name	Destinations	Notes
Yarang	Lamyai 2 Road	0+000	I/S		Hwy 410 – Puyut, Mueang Pattani, Bangkok, Khaotum, Yala, Betong; PN.2007 – Bo Thong, Nong Chik, Songkhla	Junctions
Yarang	Lamyai 2 Road	0+XXX	BR	Khlong Di Chae Bridge		
Yarang	Lamyai 2 Road	3+130		Chabaepa (Rawaeng)	PN.T1-0022 – Sano, Mueang Pattani; PN.4074 – Wat Koh Wai, Yala	Junctions
Yarang	Lamyai 2 Road	4+XXX	BR	Bridge		
Mayo	Lamyai 2 Road	6+0XX		Muang Wan	PN.2020; RRD–Muang Wan Road – Yaring, Mueang Pattani, Panan, Krado, Yala	Junctions
Mayo	Lamyai 2 Road	10+38X		Koh Chan	PN.5059 – Krasoh, Yaring, Momawi, Yala	Junctions
Mayo	Lamyai 2 Road	12+6XX		Yuerapae	PN.3002 – Momawi, Yala	T-junctions
Mayo	Lamyai 2 Road	12+9XX		Rakoh	PN.2023 – Yaring, Mueang Pattani	T-junctions
Mayo	Lamyai 2 Road	13+063	BR	Khlong Rakoh Tai Bridge		
Mayo	Mayo–Palas section	14+000		Mayo	Hwy 4092 – Thung Yang Daeng, Raman, Yala	T-junctions
Mayo	Mayo–Palas section	15+7XX		Bukecha	PN.3057; Mayo Bypass Road – Thung Yang Daeng, Momawi, Yala	T-junctions
Mayo	Mayo–Palas section	16+22X		Duwa Tai	PN.2066; Northwestern Palas Bypass Road –Palas, Panare	T-junctions
Mayo	Mayo–Palas section	17+09X		Duwa	PN.2024 – Tolang, Yaring	T-junctions
Mayo–Panare district border	Palas–Panare section	24+510		Palas	Hwy 42 / AH18 –Yaring, Mueang Pattani, Saiburi, Narathiwat, Su-ngai Kolok, Rantau Panjang (Malaysia)	Junctions
Panare	Palas–Panare section	24+92X		Khuan (1)	PN.4015 – Bang Kao	T-junctions
Panare	Palas–Panare section	25+0XX		Khuan (2)	PN.2065; Northeastern Palas Bypass Road – Palas, Mayo, Panare	Junctions
Panare	Palas–Panare section	26+784	BR	Khlong Ban Khlong Bridge		
Panare	Palas–Panare section	31+31X		Ban Nok	Hwy 4075 – Tanyong Dalo, Yaring, Mueang Pattani; PN.T70-005 – Wat Prachantakham	Junctions
Panare	Palas–Panare section	32+052	BR	Khlong Tha Kham Bridge		
Panare	Palas–Panare section	33+6XX		Tha Kham (Panare Hospital)	PN.4017 – Nam Bo	T-junctions
Panare	Palas–Panare section	35+07X		Tha Muang (2)	PN.2065 – Palas, Mayo, Charang	Junctions
Panare	Palas–Panare section	35+39X		Tha Muang (1)	PN.2016 – Charang, Nong Raet, Yaring	Junctions
Panare	Palas–Panare section	36+842		Panare	Hwy 4324 – Panare Beach Panare Bypass Road (Former Hwy 4157) –Talo Kapor, Yaring, Datoh, Laem Tachi; Hwy 4157 –Bang Kao, Saiburi, Narathiwat	Roundabout
Panare	Palas–Panare section	Through to Hwy 4324				
