= Malaysia Federal Route 76 =

Road in Malaysia

Federal Route 76

Route information
- Maintained by Malaysian Public Works Department
- Length: 163.7 km (101.7 mi)

Major junctions
- North end: Baling
- FT 67 Federal Route 67; FT 77 Federal Route 77; FT 1157 Federal Route 1157; FT 4 AH140 East–West Highway; A21 Atate Route A21; A76 Jalan Lama Sauk–Lenggong; FT 1 Federal Route 1 North–South Expressway Northern Route / AH2
- South end: Kuala Kangsar (West)

Location
- Country: Malaysia
- Primary destinations: Pengkalan Hulu, Kelian Intan, Gerik, Jeli, Kota Bharu, Lawin, Lenggong, Sauk, Kuala Kangsar

Highway system
- Highways in Malaysia; Expressways; Federal; State

Federal Route 76 is a federal highway in Kedah and Perak state, Malaysia. The 163.7-km federal highway serves as the main route from Perak and Kedah to the East–West Highway FT4, as well as the main route to Thailand via Keroh and Betong.

== Route background ==
The Kilometre Zero of the Federal Route 76 starts at Kuala Kangsar (West) interchange, Perak, at its interchange with the Malaysia Federal Route 1, the main trunk road of the central of Peninsular Malaysia.

== History ==
The Federal Route 76 is an important route in Perak, as it leads to the East–West Highway FT4 from Gerik to Jeli. In addition, this federal highway also serves as the gateway to Thailand via Keroh and Betong and vice versa. However, the original alignment of the highway was notorious for its many dangerous sharp corners. To address the safety issue, the federal government upgraded the Kuala Kangsar–Gerik section of the highway, bypassing the sharp corners along the Sauk–Lenggong section. The first section from Gerik to Lenggong was completed in 1995, followed by the second section from Kuala Kangsar to Sauk which was completed in 2002. The final section from Sauk to Lenggong was upgraded as a bypass route to avoid the dangerous sharp corners along the former section of the FT76 highway. The project was started in October 2001 and was completed in November 2005 with the total cost of RM600 million.

As a result of the road upgrade, the former Sauk–Lenggong section was later downgraded into Perak State Route A76 in 2014.

=== Notable events ===
- 1941–1942 – The Federal Route 76 became a main route for Japanese Imperial forces from Pattani to Ipoh during Battle of Malaya.
- 1955 – The Baling agreement between Communist Party of Malaya and Federation of Malaya Government.
- July 2000 – The Sauk armed heist took places.
- 12 April 2001 – Twelve women and a boy were killed when a bus skidded and crashed into a ditch off the Pengkalan Hulu–Baling road near Baling, Kedah.

== Features ==
- There are four Rest and Service Areas: Gunung Inas, Gerik, Lawin and Selat Pagar.
- Lenggong archeological town
- Chenderoh Lake

== Junctions lists ==
State	District	Location	km	mi	Exit	Name	Destinations	Notes
Kedah	Baling	Baling				Baling I/S	FT 67 Jalan Kuala Ketil – Kulim, Sungai Petani, Kuala Ketil; K10 Jalan Baling-Sik – Weng, Sik	
Kedah	Baling	Baling				Batu 7 Rambong I/S	K704 Jalan Batu 49 Bongor-Rambong – Batu 7 Rambong, Banggol Pompang, Rambong	
Kedah	Baling	Baling				Ulu Legong Hot Springs		
Kedah	Baling	Baling			Gunung Inas RSA (eastbound)			
Perak	Hulu Perak	Pengkalan Hulu				MRSM Pengkalan Hulu		
Perak	Hulu Perak	Pengkalan Hulu				Pengkalan Hulu I/S	FT 77 Jalan Keroh – Keroh, Betong; A172 Jalan Tasek – Kampung Baru Tasek	
Perak	Hulu Perak	Gerik				Kelian Intan		
Perak	Hulu Perak	Gerik				Kampung Lalang I/S	FT 1157 Malaysia Federal Route 1157 – Ayer Panas, Keroh	
Perak	Hulu Perak	Gerik				Kampung Batu Hampar		
Perak	Hulu Perak	Gerik				Kampung Plang		
Perak	Hulu Perak	Gerik				Kampung Jong		
Perak	Hulu Perak	Gerik				Kampung Kerunai		
Perak	Hulu Perak	Gerik				Kampung Pahat		
Perak	Hulu Perak	Gerik				East-West Highway I/S	FT 4 (East–West Highway) / AH140 – Kupang, Baling, Kulim, Butterworth, Jeli, Tanah Merah, Kota Bharu, Banding Island, Lake Temenggor	
Perak	Hulu Perak	Gerik			Gerik RSA (northbound)			
Perak	Hulu Perak	Gerik				Kampung Bahru Batu Dua roundabout (East–West Highway roundabout)	FT 4 (East–West Highway (old road)) / AH140 – Jeli, Tanah Merah, Kota Bharu, Banding Island, Lake Temenggor	
Perak	Hulu Perak	Gerik				Gerik town centre Jalan Kuala Kenderong I/S	A170 Jalan Kuala Kenderong – Kg. Baharu Kuala Rui, Bersia Dam and Hydroelectric Station, Temenggor Dam and Hydroelectric Station	
Perak	Hulu Perak	Gerik				Gerik town centre Jalan Tanjung Kala I/S	A169 Perak State Route A169 – Kampung Tanjung Kala	
Perak	Hulu Perak	Gerik			Sungai Rui bridge			
Perak	Hulu Perak	Gerik				Kampung Padang		
Perak	Hulu Perak	Gerik				Kampung Tawai		
Perak	Hulu Perak	Lenggong				Kampung Kenayat Besar		
Perak	Hulu Perak	Lenggong				Lawin		
Perak	Hulu Perak	Lenggong			Lawin RSA (northbound)			
Perak	Hulu Perak	Lenggong				Kampung Belum Baharu		
Perak	Hulu Perak	Lenggong			Selat Pagar RSA (northbound)			
Perak	Hulu Perak	Lenggong				Kampung Sumpitan I/S	A21 Perak State Route A21 – Kubu Gajah, Taiping, Selama, Bagan Serai	
Perak	Hulu Perak	Lenggong				Lenggong I/S	A76 Jalan Lama Sauk–Lenggong – Lenggong town centre	
Perak	Hulu Perak	Lenggong				Kota Tampan I/S	A76 Jalan Lama Sauk–Lenggong – Lenggong town centre	
Perak	Hulu Perak	Lenggong				Lata Kekabu Waterfall	Lata Kekabu Waterfall	
Perak	Hulu Perak	Lenggong				MRSM Lenggong I/S	A76 Jalan Lama Sauk–Lenggong – Lenggong town centre, Maktab Rendah Sains MARA (MRSM) Lenggong, Kampung Changkat Berangan, Tasik Raban, Kampung Kuak, Kampung Jenalik	
Perak	Hulu Perak	Lenggong			Tasik Raban bridge Raja Muda Nazrin Bridge			
Perak	Hulu Perak	Lenggong			Tasik Raban RSA (southbound, abandoned)			
Perak	Hulu Perak	Lenggong				Kampung Kelantan		
Perak	Hulu Perak	Lenggong				Kampung Jenalik I/S	A76 Jalan Lama Sauk–Lenggong – Kampung Changkat Berangan, Tasik Raban, Kampung Kuak, Kampung Jenalik	
Perak	Hulu Perak	Lenggong				Kampung Jenalik Hilir		
Perak	Hulu Perak	Lenggong				Kampung Ngor I/S	A76 Jalan Lama Sauk–Lenggong – Kampung Changkat Berangan, Tasik Raban, Kampung Kuak, Kampung Jenalik	
Perak	Hulu Perak	Lenggong				Kampung Changkat Duku		
Perak	Kuala Kangsar	Sauk				Sauk I/S	A152 Perak State Route A152 – Chegar Galah, Bendang Selinsing, Chenderoh Lake	
Perak	Kuala Kangsar	Kuala Kangsar				Kampung Chuar Hulu		
Perak	Kuala Kangsar	Kuala Kangsar				Kampung Chuar		
Perak	Kuala Kangsar	Kuala Kangsar				Kati I/S	A11 Jalan Sungai Temong – Sungai Temong, Sungai Siput, Kuala Kangsar	
Perak	Kuala Kangsar	Kuala Kangsar				Kampung Changkat Jambu		
Perak	Kuala Kangsar	Kuala Kangsar				Kampung Liman Kati		
Perak	Kuala Kangsar	Kuala Kangsar				Sungai Chempias I/S	A107 Jalan Paya Lintah – Paya Lintah, Padang Rengas	
Perak	Kuala Kangsar	Kuala Kangsar				Kampung Lubuk Merbau I/S	A161 Jalan Sungai Akar – Kampung Sungai Akar, Kampung Tanah Merah, Kampung Beluru	
Perak	Kuala Kangsar	Kuala Kangsar				Miel Industrial Area I/S	Miel Industrial Area, Chenderoh Community College	
Perak	Kuala Kangsar	Kuala Kangsar				Kuala Kangsar (West) I/C	FT 1 Jalan Taiping – Padang Rengas, Changkat Jering, Taiping, Kuala Kangsar, Sungai Siput	Diamond interchange
Perak	Kuala Kangsar	Kuala Kangsar			Kuala Kangsar Toll Plaza			
Perak	Kuala Kangsar	Kuala Kangsar			143	Kuala Kangsar I/C	North–South Expressway Northern Route / AH2 – Bukit Kayu Hitam, Penang, Kuala Lumpur, Ipoh	
1.000 mi = 1.609 km; 1.000 km = 0.621 mi
