= Perak State Route A11 =

Road in Malaysia

Perak Route 11
- Jalan Sungai Temong

Major junctions
- Northwest end: Kati
- FT 76 Federal route 76; FT 1 Federal route 1
- Southeast end: Kampung Jamuan

Location
- Country: Malaysia
- Primary destinations: Sungai Temong; Kuala Kangsar

Highway system
- Highways in Malaysia; Expressways; Federal; State

Jalan Sungai Temong (Perak state route A11) is a major road in Perak, Malaysia.

== List of junctions ==
Km	Exit	Junctions	To	Remarks
		Kurai	North; FT 76 Baling; FT 76 Gerik; FT 4 Kota Bharu; FT 76 Lenggong South; FT 76 Kuala Kangsar; FT 1 Taiping; North–South Expressway Northern Route AH2 North–South Expressway Southern Route; Bukit Kayu Hitam; Penang; Kuala Lumpur; Ipoh	T-junctions
		Kampung Bendang Ujib		
		Kampung Padang Lalang		
		Sungai Temong		
		Kampung Berala		
		Kampung Maran		
		Kampung Changkat Cheh Kampar	Jalan Kampung Cheh Hulu'; Kampung Cheh Hulu	T-junctions
		Kampung Cheh Hilir		
		Kampung Pengkalan	North; A157 Jalan Chegar Galah; Chegar Galah; Bendang Selinsing	T-junctions
		Kampung Temong Hulu		
		Kampung Suak Parang		
		Kampung Lubuk Chapin		
		Kampung Rimba Badak		
		Jalan Sungai Akar	West; A161 Jalan Sungai Akar; Sungai Akar	T-junctions
		Railway crossing		
		Kampung Kubang Halban		
		Taman Seri Wawasan		
		Desa Seri Iskandar		
		Kampung Jamuan	Northeast; FT 1 Ipoh; FT 1 Sungai Siput Southwest; FT 76 Kuala Kangsar; FT 1 Taiping; North–South Expressway Northern Route AH2 North–South Expressway Southern Route; Bukit Kayu Hitam; Penang; Kuala Lumpur; Ipoh	T-junctions
