= Malaysia Federal Route 1157 =

Road in Malaysia

Federal Route 1157
- Jalan Lepang Nering

Route information
- Maintained by Malaysian Public Works Department

Major junctions
- Northwest end: Ayer Panas
- FT 77 Federal route 77; FT 76 Federal route 76
- South end: Kampung Baharu

Location
- Country: Malaysia
- Primary destinations: Lepang Nenering

Highway system
- Highways in Malaysia; Expressways; Federal; State

Federal Route 1157, or Jalan Lepang Nering, is a federal road in Perak, Malaysia. The roads connects Ayer Panas to Kampung Baharu.

At most sections, the Federal Route 1157 was built under the JKR R5 road standard, with a speed limit of 90 km/h.

== List of junctions and towns ==
Km	Exit	Junctions	To	Remarks
		Ayer Panas	Northeast; FT 77 Keroh; 4106เบตง Betong (Thailand) Southwest; FT 77 Pengkalan Hulu; FT 76 Baling	T-junctions
		Lepang Nenering Forest Reserve		
		FELDA Lepang Nenering		
		Kampung Baharu	Northwest; FT 76 Baling South; FT 76 Gerik	T-junctions
