= Gerik =

Town and district capital in Hulu Perak, Perak, Malaysia

- Town and district capital
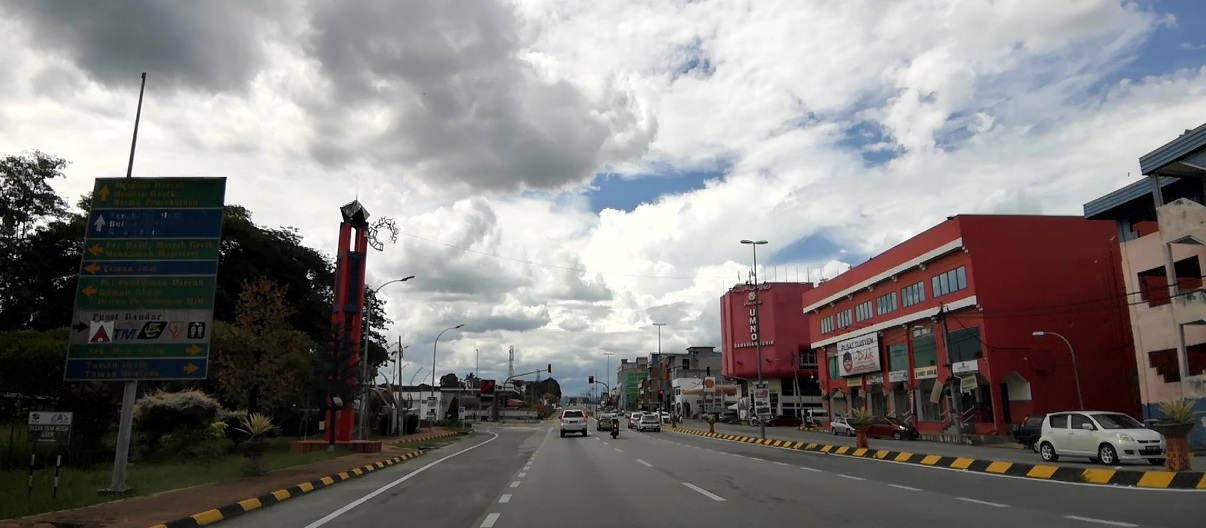

- Seal

- Location within Malaysia
- Coordinates: 5°25′N 101°08′E
- Country: Malaysia
- State: Perak
- District: Hulu Perak

Government
  - Type: Local government
  - Body: Gerik District Council
  - President: Mohd Zairasyahli Shah Zakaria
- Time zone: UTC+8 (Malaysian Standard Time)
- Website: https://www.gerik.gov.my/

Gerik District Council Majlis Daerah Gerik
- Local Government Act 1976

Type
- Type: Municipal Council of Gerik

History
- Founded: 1 December 1979

Leadership
- President: Mohd Zairasyahli Shah Zakaria

Structure
- Political groups: Councillors: DAP (6); PKR (3); Amanah (1); UMNO (4); Vacant (11)

Motto
- Menuju Era Gemilang; Towards A Glorious Era

Meeting place
- Jalan Haji Meor Yahaya, 33300 Gerik, Perak Darul Ridzuan.

Website
- www.gerik.gov.my

Gerik (alternate spelling: Grik) is a mukim and the district capital of Hulu Perak District, Perak, Malaysia. The town is also known as Rest Town due to its strategic location next to East-West Highway Federal Route 4, the main route linking Kedah, Penang and Kelantan.

== History ==
According to historical records, the first person to enter Gerik was Tun Saban, the son of Tun Perak, and the treasurer of the Malacca Sultanate in the early 16th century. During the fall of the sultanate to the Portuguese, Tun Saban migrated to Hulu Patani and then moved to Belum, Gerik. He became the chairman of the community at Belum.

Gerik is bordered by Reman State to the north. Raja Reman trespassed into Gerik and captured Klian Intan and Kroh (Pengkalan Hulu). By the 19th century, most of Gerik's territory was conquered by King Reman. In 1902, the monarchy in Reman was abolished by the Siamese government and the Gerik region was incorporated as a colony.

On 9 July 1902, the Siamese government entered into an agreement with the British government to hand over Kedah, Perlis, Kelantan and Terengganu to British rule. The agreement was signed in Bangkok by Sir John Anderson (Straits Settlements) and the Siam Foreign Secretary. Among the conditions in the agreement, the Siamese government also had to hand over the Gerik district, which had been taken by Raja Reman to the Perak government. The ceremony of handing over the Gerik area was held in Kroh on 16 July 1909.

== Notable landmarks ==
- District and Land Office
- Malaysian Public Works Department (JKR) district offices
- District mosque
- Bus Station
- Klinik Kesihatan Plang

== Schools ==
- MRSM Gerik
- SK Mahkota Sari
- SK Sri Adika Raja
- SK Plang
- SK Batu 4
- SJK(T) Gerik
- SMK Gerik
- SMK Sultan Idris Shah II
- SMK Seri Budiman
- SMK Kenering
- Kolej Komuniti Gerik
- SMK Batu 4, Jalan Kuala Rui
- SJK(C) Chung Wa
- SJK(C) Batu 2
- SJK(C) Kuala Rui
- Kolej Vokasional Gerik
- SK Pahit
- SK Kerunai
- SK Budiman
- SK Tan Sri Ghazali Jawi
- Sk Ganda Temengor

== Fishing and camping ==
- Belum Rainforest Resort
- Air Beruk (Camping Site)
- Homestay Eco Resort Kampung Plang
- Tasik Banding
- Tasik Temenggor (Temenggor Lake)
- Tasik Bersia Lama
- Gerik Illo

== Transportation ==
Gerik is located next to the intersection of highways Malaysia Federal Route 4 and Malaysia Federal Route 76. Highway Federal Route 4 is the main route preferred by Penang and Kedah motorists to access the east coast states of Kelantan and Terengganu. Highway Federal Route 76 connects Gerik to Pengkalan Hulu and Baling District due north, and to Kuala Kangsar, the royal seat of Perak in the state's southern region.

== Politics ==
Gerik is currently represented in the Dewan Rakyat of the Malaysian Parliament by Fathul Huzir Ayob of the BERSATU political party, which is a part of the Perikatan Nasional coalition.

Gerik also supplies two state constituencies to the Perak State Legislative Assembly, namely:

- Pengkalan Hulu (Perikatan Nasional)
- Temengor (Barisan Nasional)

== Notable people ==
- Salbiah Mohamed - politician
- Hasbullah Osman - politician
- Syazwan Roslan - footballer
- Wan Mohamed Wan Teh - politician

== See also ==
- Kingdom of Reman
