= Kroh =

Town in Perak, Malaysia

Coordinates: 5°43′N 101°00′E

Kroh or Keruh (Thai: โกร๊ะ; RTGS: Kro), now known as Pengkalan Hulu, is a town in Hulu Perak District, Perak, Malaysia bordering Thailand and also the state of Kedah. The nearest town on the Thailand side is Betong in Yala province.

== History ==
Kroh began as the administrative center of Kingdom of Reman (part of the State of Patani), which is located at the eastern boundary of Kedah. However, King of Reman invaded Klian Intan and undertook mining in the area, until the onset of a series of disputes with the Perak Government which initiated a number of agreements between the British, Siamese and Perak. In 1902, Siamese government moved in to abolish the monarchy of the State of Reman. After the Anglo-Siamese Treaty of 1909, the Siamese transferred the northern part of Hulu Perak district to the Federated Malay States, of which Perak is part of. Hulu Perak district delivery ceremony was held at Kroh on 16 July 1909.

Kroh now known as Pengkalan Hulu. History of Kroh's name starts with a small river that flows through this area. This river comes from a village called Selarong. Selarong means 'elephant trail' in Arabic. The river and covered with mud baths, the elephant belonging to King Reman, the number reach hundreds. To facilitate the elephant bath, King Reman was ordered that dams built to contain water. The river flows became a small lake with the water that is murky. Due to this city that was named Kroh in the past.

On 4 January 1984, during the reign of the 33rd Sultan of Perak, the late Sultan Idris Al-Mutawakkil Alallahi Shah (Sultan Idris Shah II), the town's name was changed from Kroh to Pengkalan Hulu, as it served as a transit point when the Sultan visited the Hulu Perak district.

Today, the remains of a small lake has been developed by the district administration as a recreational park named Taman Tasek Takong. The relationship between elephant with Kroh's name has also been immortalised by the District Council logo Pengkalan Hulu, Perak Darul Ridzuan.

Please see Pengkalan Hulu for further details
