= Operation Matador (1941) =

British WWII plan in Malaya and Thailand

- Part of the Second World War
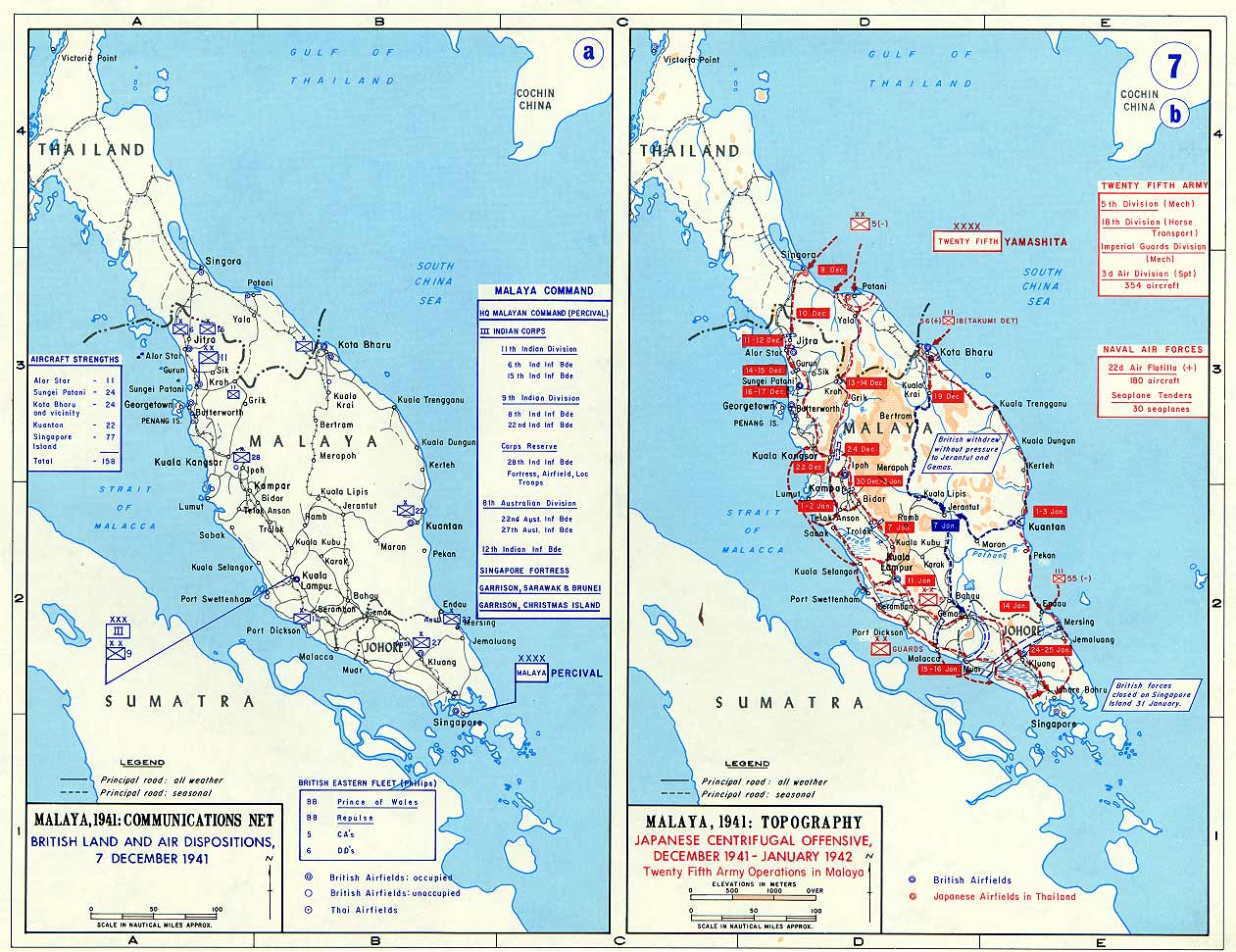
- Map showing the Japanese invasion of Malaya
- Location: Malaya and Thailand
- Outcome: Cancelled

Operation Matador was a military contingency plan of the British Malaya Command to move troops into southern Thailand to counter a Japanese amphibious attack on British Malaya. The plan was never implemented.

== Background ==
In 1937, Major-General William Dobbie, Officer Commanding Malaya (1935–1939), looked at Malaya's defences and reported that during the monsoon season, from October to March, landings could be made by an enemy on the east coast and bases could be established in Siam (Thailand). He predicted that landings could be made at Songkhla and Pattani in Siam and Kota Bharu in Malaya. He recommended large reinforcements to be sent immediately. His predictions turned out to be correct but his recommendations were ignored.

== Prelude ==
In August 1941, the Commander-in-Chief (CinC) of Far East Command, Air Chief Marshal Robert Brooke-Popham, submitted a plan with the code-name Matador, to London for approval (PRO record FO 371/28163). The plan relied on the assumption that the Japanese would land on the east coast of Siam at Songkhla and Pattani, then advance south to Jitra and Kroh. It was envisaged that two forces could intercept them just over the border in Thailand, long enough for the main force to assemble and attack. There were several problems with the plan; In January 1941, a request for additional resources that the plan intended to use remained unfulfilled and the previous year Sir Josiah Crosby, the British Ambassador in Siam, signed a non-aggression pact with Luang Phibunsongkhram, the Prime Minister of Siam.

On 5 December 1941, when a Japanese invasion became likely, the plan was modified to use existing forces. It was to be put into action as soon as an attack was imminent. If a country attacked or was invited into Siam, troops under British command would rush to Songkhla and defend it against a seaborne attack. This job was allocated to 11th Indian Infantry Division (Major-General David Murray-Lyon) who also had to defend Jitra. These two tasks over-stretched his resources and made his objectives difficult to accomplish.

On 5 December, London gave permission for the C-in-C Far East Command to decide if Operation Matador should begin. The primary strategic decision to be decided upon, was whether a forestalling move should be launched on Siam before the Japanese landed. Malaya Command was responsible for the detailed planning of Matador and on 6 December 1941 it had reworked the plan and allocated forces for immediate deployment. That evening, in a meeting with the Governor, Sir Shenton Thomas, and Brooke-Popham, the General Officer Commanding Malaya Arthur Percival recommended that a forestalling attack was premature.

== Aftermath ==
If Matador had been implemented the Japanese had contingency plans to counter a likely British counter-move. They would use the Bangkok airport and the airfields of Southern Siam to establish air superiority and then invade from the Kra Isthmus.

== Naval role ==
Matador was contingent on Force Z being able to cripple the Japanese naval presence in the Far East. The Admiralty had debated sending a larger yet older fleet of battleships or sending a smaller more modern fleet, similar to the Bismarck and Tirpitz in the Battle of the Atlantic. HMS Repulse and Prince of Wales were sent without air support or any anti aircraft defenses. They were sunk at the beginning of the Malaya Campaign, ending the British naval presence for the duration of the war.

== See also ==
- Japanese Invasion of Thailand
- Japanese Invasion of Malaya
- Operation Krohcol – British military response to the Japanese that was carried out instead of Matador

== Bibliography ==
- Shores, Christopher; Cull, Brian (1992). Bloody Shambles: The Drift to War to the Fall of Singapore. Vol. I. London: Grub Street. ISBN 0-948817-50-X.
- Woodburn-Kirby, S.; Addis, C. T.; Meiklehohn, J. F.; Wards, G. T.; Desoer, N. L. (2004) [1957]. Butler, J. R. M. (ed.). The War Against Japan: The Loss of Singapore. History of the Second World War United Kingdom Military Series. Vol. I (pbk. facs. Naval & Military Press, Uckfield ed.). London: HMSO. ISBN 978-1-84574-060-3 – via Archive Foundation.
