= Kota Baru, Thailand =

Sub-district in the Raman District, Thailand

Kota Baru, Thailand (Thai: โกตาบารู, pronounced [kōːtāː bāːrūː], Malay: كوتا بارو) is a sub-district (tambon) in Raman District, Yala Province, southern Thailand.

== History ==
In 2465 B.E., the Siamese Government established a Malayan provincial administration divided into seven districts and dependent on Pattani county. The county is divided into Pattani, Nong Chik, Yaring, Sai Buri, Yala, Ra-ngae and Kota Baru or Raman, which depend on Yala. Tuan Kalupae was the first sheriff of Kota Baru. His title was "Luang-aat-ta-sit-ti -som-boon".

Kota Baru abounded with natural resources, including elephants, forests, gold and rubies. An army protected a territory extending to Perlis, Malaysia. Many governors were respected by Buddhists, Muslims and Chinese from both local and foreign areas, which are called Tohnijawea or Tohni.

Kota Baru Governor Phraya Ratanapakdee (Tuan malaleayawor) was wealthy and respected by the people. He donated land to build Ban Kota Baru school (Rattanapadung wittaya). Rattanapakdee was loved by the people. People who were homeless could live in the palace in exchange for working or farming. Kota Baru's palace was a shelter for people traveling or doing business in Yala. In the kitchen, two large cookers supplied rice for guests.

Kota Baru's governor enjoyed sport, especially a martial art called Si-la. The governor trained the young men in the palace as dancers and sent a teacher from Kota Baru to Kelantan state. On an important day, a si-la dance is held. At night time Di-ke hulu show is offered. Di-ke hulu was created in Kota Baru. Kota Baru was named "Kota Ramai" which means a city of joy relating to important events or welcoming guests from afar.

Descendants of the governor, use the title Tuan in front of their name. Most are domiciled in Kota Baru, Raman District, Yala.

Kota Baru was a district of Yala Province until 2469 B.E. After that the name changed back to "Raman".

== Administration ==
=== Central administration ===
The tambon is divided into four villages (mubans).

No.	Name	Thai
1.	Ban Kota Baru	บ้านโกตาบารู
2.	Ban Ma Due Long	บ้านมะดือลง
3.	Ban Chalong Hi Le	บ้านจาลงฮิเล
4.	Ban Kumpong Bu Ke	บ้านกำปงบูเก๊ะ

=== Local administration ===
The subdistrict is covered by the subdistrict municipality (thesaban tambon) Kota Baru (เทศบาลตำบลโกตาบารู).
