= Pengkalan Hulu =

Town and mukim in Hulu Perak, Perak, Malaysia

- Town
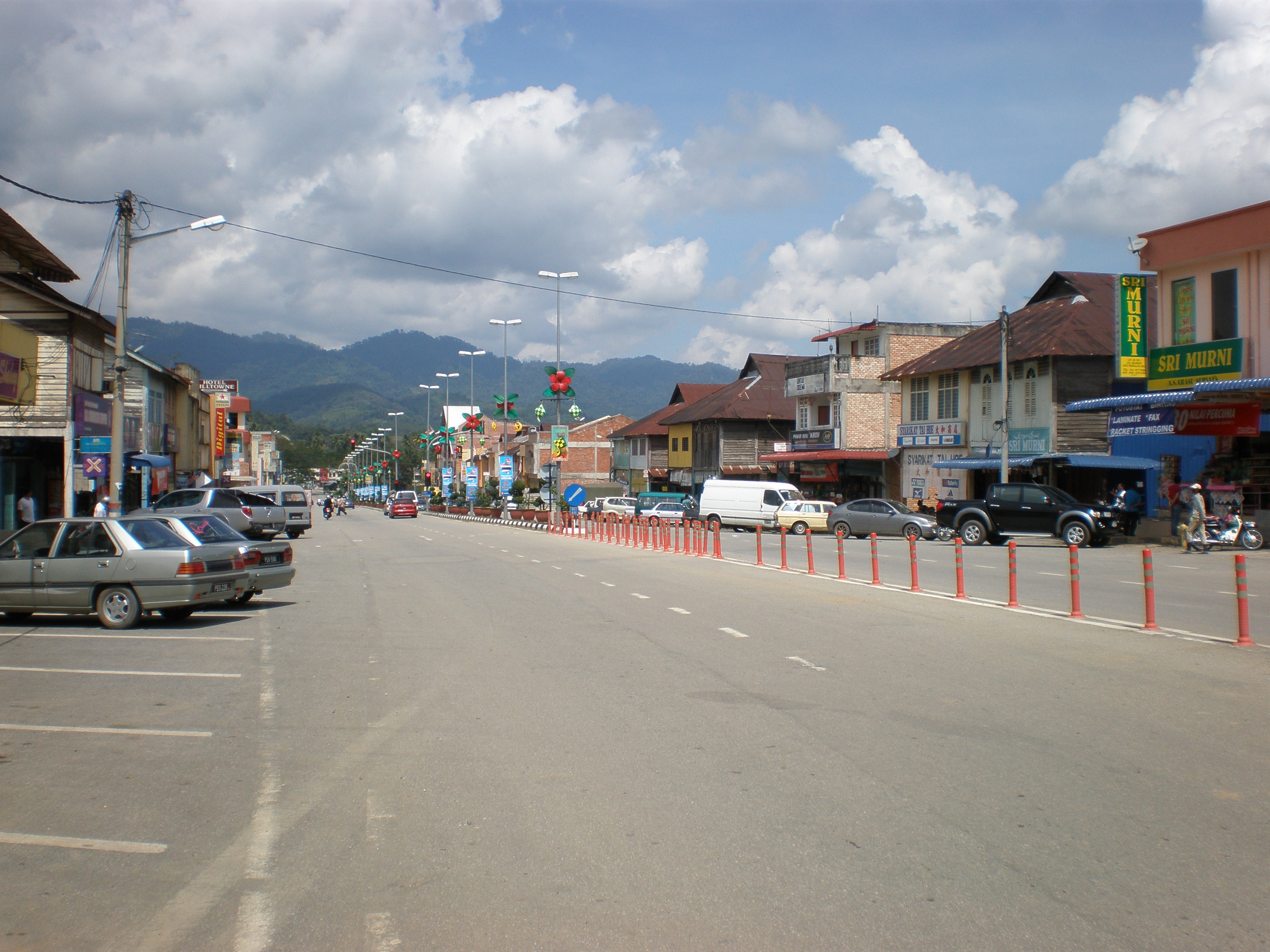

- Seal

- Location within Malaysia
- Coordinates: 5°42′22″N 100°59′58″E
- Country: Malaysia
- State: Perak

Government
  - Type: Local government
  - Body: Pengkalan Hulu District Council
  - President: Meor Shahibul Fadilah Zainuddin
- Time zone: UTC+8 (Malaysian Standard Time)
- Website: www.mdph.gov.my

Pengkalan Hulu District Council Majlis Daerah Pengkalan Hulu

Type
- Type: Local authority

History
- Founded: 1 December 1979

Leadership
- President: Meor Shahibul Fadilah Zainuddin
- District Secretary: Noraslina Saidin

Motto
- Bersih, Aman, Maju (Clean, Peace, Progressive)

Meeting place
- Jalan Wisma Kroh 1, 33100, 33100 Pengkalan Hulu, Perak

Website
- www.mdph.gov.my

Pengkalan Hulu in Hulu Perak District

Pengkalan Hulu, formerly known as Kroh or Keroh, is a town and a mukim in Hulu Perak District, Perak, Malaysia, bordering Thailand and Kedah. The nearest town on the Thailand side is Betong in Yala province.

Although described as a border town, Pengkalan Hulu is 6 km from the actual Malaysia-Thailand border which is located at Bukit Berapit, where the Malaysian customs, immigration and quarantine station is located. The town is served by both Federal Route 76, which connects it to Gerik and Kuala Kangsar to the south and Baling in Kedah to the north, and Federal Route 77 which goes in a northeasterly direction to Bukit Berapit and onward to Betong.

It is located on a plateau at the height of 380 m above sea level.

== Demographics ==
Languages spoken here include Malay, Chinese (Hokkien as well as Cantonese), Tamil, English and Thai. The main religions are Islam, Buddhism, Hinduism and Christianity. The population is largely Malay with significant Chinese, Thai and Indian segments.

== Government and politics ==
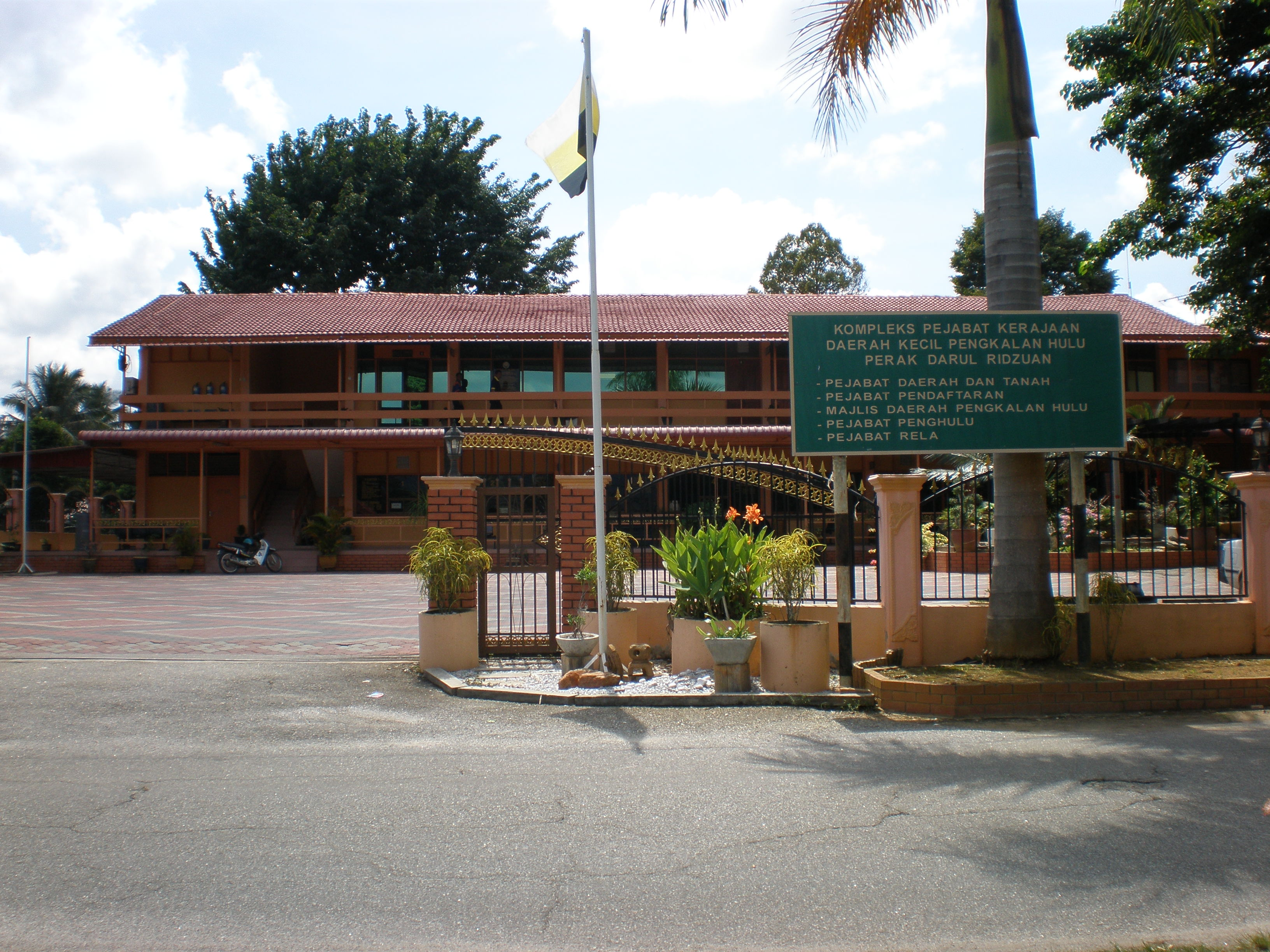
Pengkalan Hulu Government Office

Pengkalan Hulu is also an autonomous sub-district (daerah kecil), consisting of the mukims of Pengkalan Hulu and nearby Belukar Semang.

In the Malaysian Parliament, Pengkalan Hulu is part of the Gerik parliamentary constituency.

== History ==
The history of Pengkalan Hulu began as the administrative center of Negeri Reman (part of Negeri Patani) whose borders were Kedah and Patani. However, Raja Reman invaded Klian Intan and established tin mining there, leading to several conflicts with the Perak government and several agreements brokered between the British, Siam, and Perak. In 1902, the Siamese government abolished the royal governance system in Negeri Reman. Subsequently, the Siamese government handed over the Hulu Perak district to the Perak government. The ceremony for the transfer of the Hulu Perak district took place in Kroh on July 16, 1909.

Pengkalan Hulu was formerly known as Kroh. The history of the name Kroh begins with a small river that flows through this area. The flowing river originates from a village called Selarong. Selarong means 'elephant path' in Arabic. This river served as a bathing and wallowing place for the elephants belonging to Raja Reman, whose number reached hundreds. To facilitate the bathing of these elephants, Raja Reman ordered the construction of a dam to impound water. The dammed river flow formed a small lake with constantly murky water. It is for this reason that the town was named Kroh in the past which in Malay means murky.

On January 4, 1984, during the reign of the 33rd Sultan of Perak, the late Sultan Idris Al-Mutawakkil Alallahi Shah (Sultan Idris Shah II), His Majesty graciously consented to change the name Kroh to Pengkalan Hulu because this place served as a stopover when His Majesty traveled to the Hulu Perak district.

Nowadays, the remnants of the small lake have been developed by the district administration into a recreational park called Taman Tasek Takong. The connection between elephants and the name Kroh has also been immortalized through the logo of the Pengkalan Hulu District Council, Perak Darul Ridzuan.

== Education ==
Pengkalan Hulu is served by a range of primary and secondary educational institutions serving the town and surrounding rural communities These include national schools, Chinese and Tamil vernacular schools, secondary schools and religious education institutions. Among the schools in the area are Sekolah Menengah Kebangsaan Pengkalan Hulu, Sekolah Menengah Kebangsaan Tun Saban and Maktab Rendah Sains MARA alongside several primary schools.

== Mosques ==
Islam is the predominant religion among the Malay community in Pengkalan Hulu, with mosques serving as important centres for worship and community activities. The town's main mosque, Masjid Jamek Pengkalan Hulu, is designated as the district mosque. Other mosques serve local congregations in villages and settlements throughout the district, including Masjid Al-Aula in Kampung Selarong.

== Places of interest ==
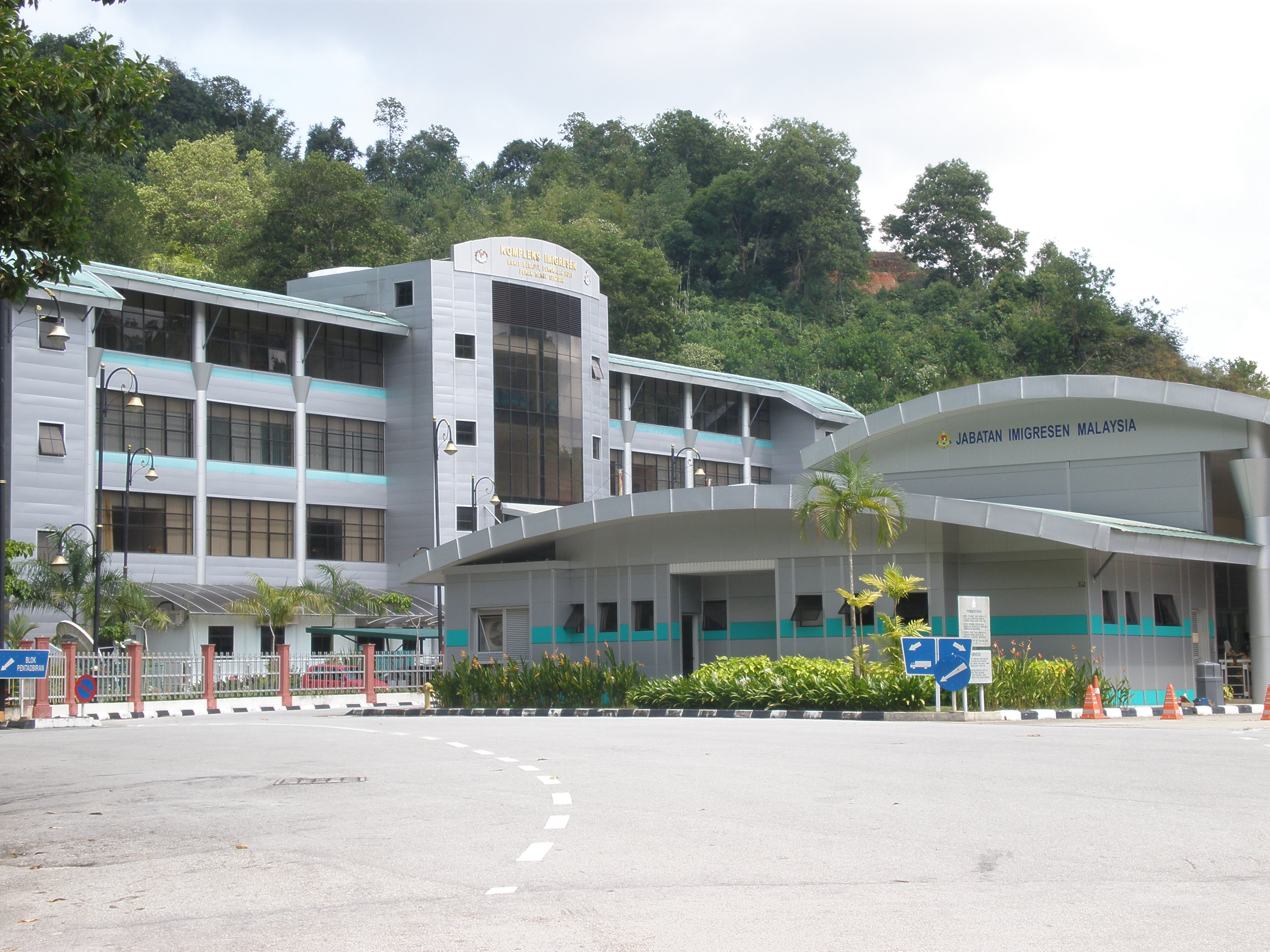
Malaysia CIQ at Bukit Berapit

- Gunung Lang kuak hulu - recreation and view point.
- Hot Spring Pond
- Golf Course
- Black River Cascade
- Kuak Shoe Cascade
- Kuak Rainbow Cascade
- Gua Gendang (Caves of Drum)- a unique cave with underground stream situated in a nearby Siamese village called Kampung Tasek.
- Taman Tasik Pengkalan Hulu - a unique human made lake with nice view located near the town of Pengkalan Hulu.
- The Zone Free Duty Shopping Centre - Located near border of Thailand.
- Kelian Intan, situated 20 km from Pengkalan Hulu town. Well known as one of the Black Areas in Malaysian history as a place for Communist Malaya Parties to hide. It is also connect Pengkalan Hulu town down south to Gerik Town.
- "Northgate" is a mixed commercial and industrial development by the Indonesia-Malaysia-Thailand (IMT-GT) Growth Triangle.
