= Betong, Thailand =

Betong เบตง (Thai) Betung (Malay)
- Town
- เทศบาลเมืองเบตง (Thai)
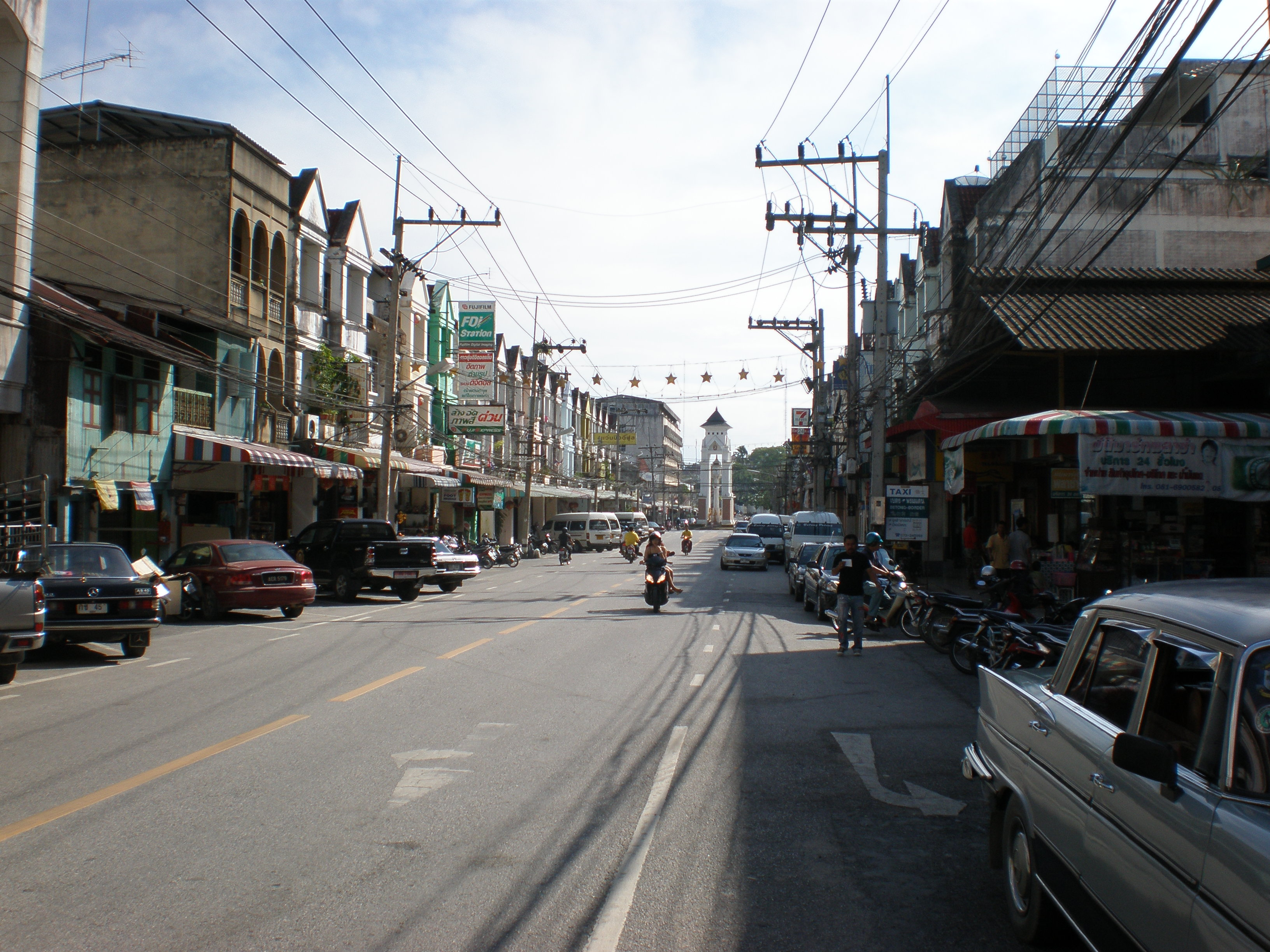
- Main Street

- Location in Thailand
- Coordinates: 5°46′23″N 101°4′21″E
- Country: Thailand
- Province: Yala
- District: Betong

Government
  - Mayor: Somyot Lertlamyong

Area
  - Total: 78 km^{2} (30 sq mi)

Population (2005)
  - Total: 24,688
  - Density: 320/km^{2} (820/sq mi)
- Time zone: UTC+7 (ICT)
- Area code: (+66) 73
- Website: betongcity.go.th

Betong (Thai: เบตง, pronounced [bēː.tōŋ]; Malay: Betung (Jawi: بيتوڠ); Chinese: 勿洞) is a town (thesaban mueang) in southern Thailand, near the Malaysian border. It is the capital of Betong District, the southernmost district of Yala Province. As of 2005, the town has a population of 24,688.

Betong is the southernmost town of Thailand and is popular with Malaysian tourists, due to its location at the border with the Malaysian state of Perak.

== Etymology ==
The name Betong is actually the Thai corruption of Betung. Its original Malay name means 'bamboo', more specifically dendrocalamus asper.

== History ==
The town was created as a local administration unit on 30 September 1939, when the sub-district municipality (thesaban tambon) was set up. The town was upgraded to thesaban mueang status on 20 February 2004.

== Economy ==
Tourism is the main driver of the economy of Betong, especially sex tourism. Mass tourism was not common to Betong until it was launched as one of Thailand's pilot targets for western tourists with the opening of its airport for commercial flights in March 2022. Academic Surang Artnarong has estimated that the town is home to 3,000 to 5,000 sex workers, who primarily service Malaysian tourists. In 2014, 466,913 foreigners visited Betong, generating 2,130 million baht in revenue. The number of tourist arrivals rose to 700,000 in 2016.

== Transportation ==
Betong is accessible only through roads, via the 410 highway that originates from Yala, and Highway 77 from Pengkalan Hulu, Perak.

In January 2022, the Department of Airports opened the Betong Airport on a 920-rai site, which is 13 km east of the town. It is built at a cost of 1.9 billion baht. Designed to handle 300 arrivals per hour, it is projected to serve one million passengers per year, generating three billion baht for the district. Nok Air was selected to be the airline to serve the airport. The airline operated three return flights per-week from Bangkok's Don Mueang Airport from April to October 2022, but cancelled the service due to low passenger numbers. In 2025 only 728 passengers were handled at the airport. An issue is the 1800 meter runway, which restricts operations to small aircraft, and the hilly location that limits its service area.

== Gallery ==
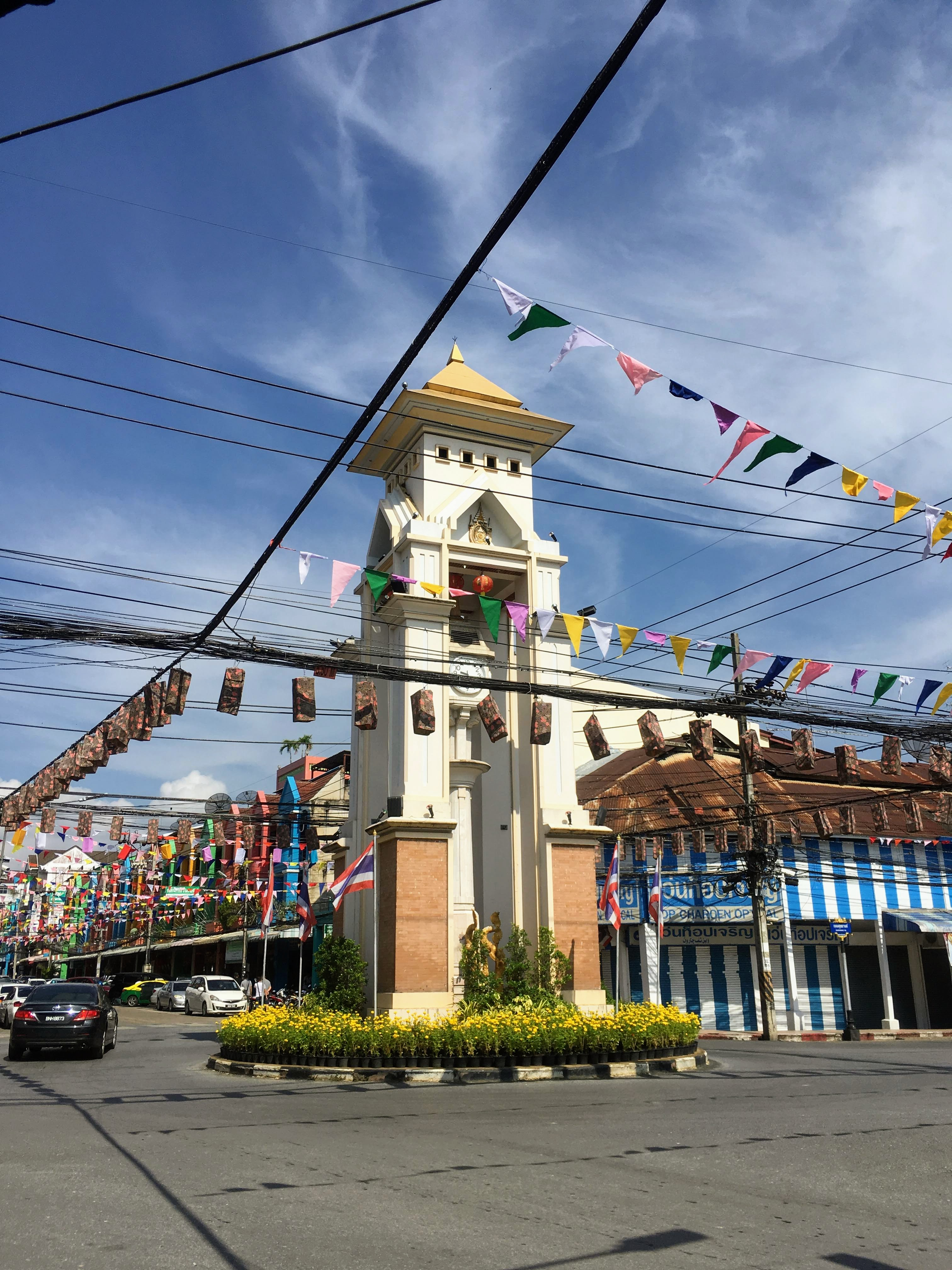
Betong Bell Tower

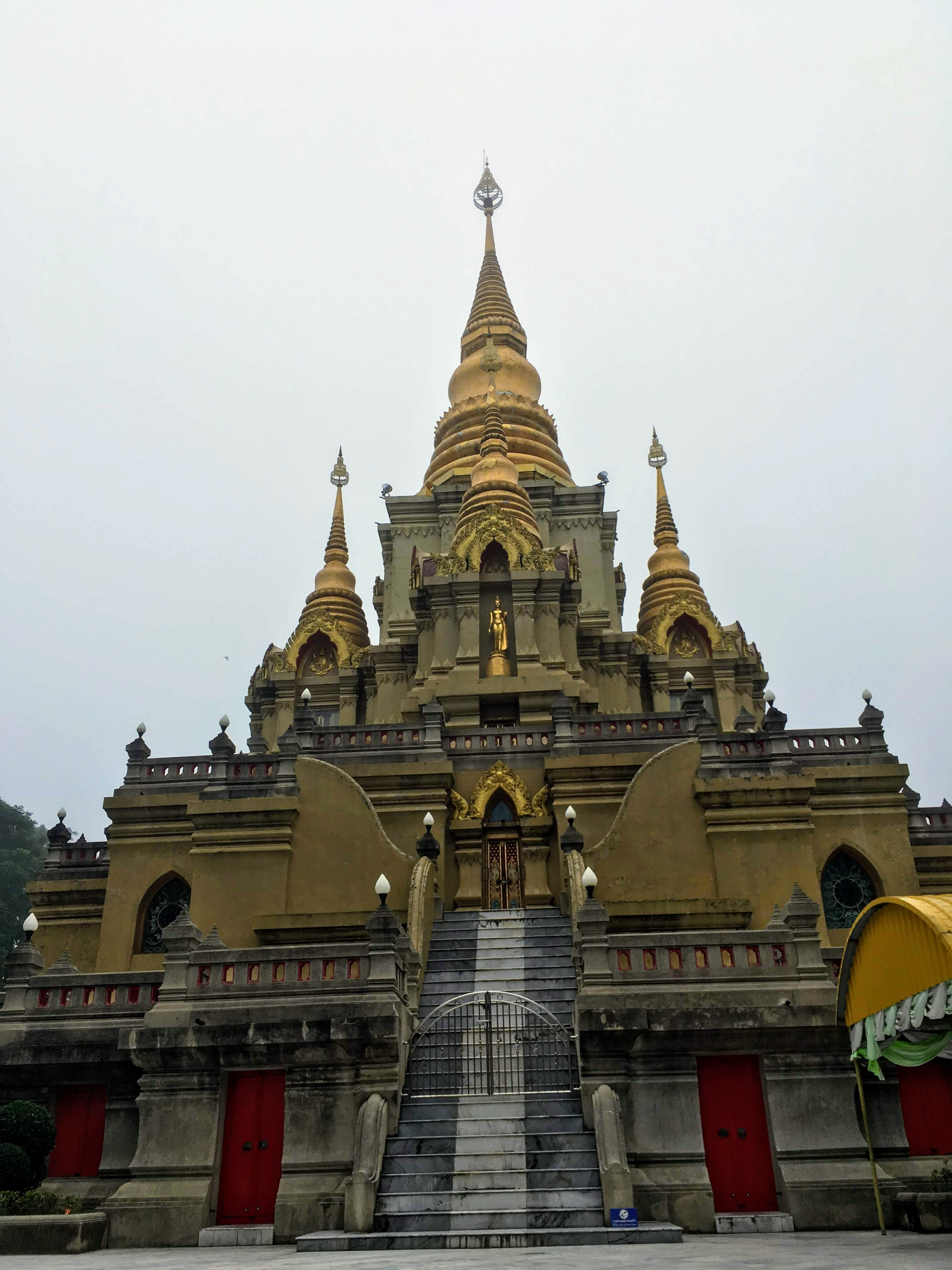
Wat Phutthathiwat
