= East–West Highway (Malaysia) =

Road in Malaysia

Federal Route 4
- East–West Highway (Phase 1: Gerik–Jeli Highway; Phase 2: Kulim–Baling Highway and Titi Karangan–Gerik Highway)

Route information
- Part of AH140
- Maintained by Malaysian Public Works Department
- Length: 215.5 km (133.9 mi)
- Existed: 1970–present
- History: First phase completed in 1982; second phase completed in 2005

Major junctions
- West end: Lunas, Kedah
- Butterworth–Kulim Expressway / FT 4 / AH140; FT 67 Federal Route 67; FT 76 Federal Route 76; FT 205 Federal Route 205; FT 66 Federal Route 66
- East end: Jeli, Kelantan

Location
- Country: Malaysia
- Primary destinations: Lake Temenggor, Banding Island, Tanah Merah, Kota Bharu, Pasir Puteh

Highway system
- Highways in Malaysia; Expressways; Federal; State

East–West Highway (Malay: Lebuhraya Timur–Barat or Jalan Raya Timur–Barat, (JRTB)) or also known as Gerik–Jeli Highway (Phase 1), Kulim–Baling Highway and Titi Karangan–Gerik Highway (both are part of Phase 2), Federal Route 4, Asian Highway Route 140 is the 215 kilometres (134 mi) federal highway constructed by the Malaysian Public Works Department (JKR) to shorten the journey from Kota Bharu, Kelantan to northwestern towns and cities of Malaysia such as Alor Star, Kedah and Penang. The highway connects Gerik, Perak in the west to Jeli, Kelantan in the east, before being extended further to Lunas, Kedah.

== Overview ==
The East–West Highway FT4 was opened to traffic on 1 July 1982. The construction of the highway was one of the largest projects undertaken by the JKR and its completion adds to the large mileage of roads in the country providing necessary access to new areas and the infrastructure for development works. The construction of the first phase of the highway was carried out by JKR workers, while the bridges and some of the ancillary works were carried out through contractors; during the second phase, the entire construction job was done by contractors.

Before East–West Highway was built, the journey from Alor Star to Kota Bharu may reach over 1,000 kilometres (621 mi), but the highway shortens the distance by 671 kilometres (417 mi). The highway includes Lake Temenggor Bridge which crosses Lake Temenggor, a hydroelectric dam and Pulau Banding, an artificial island.

The East–West Highway is one of the more scenic routes in Peninsular Malaysia, due to its hilly nature. The highway passes through two major mountain ranges, namely the Bintang Range and the Titiwangsa Range. As one enters the highway, the Titiwangsa Range through which the highway traverses comes into view in the distant. Apart from this, they can see the primary jungle which is rich with timber on both sides as they travel along the gentle curves. As one proceeds, the jungle gives way to the huge artificial Lake Temenggor at Banding. Halfway along the highway, the elevation of the road is over 1,100 m (3,600 ft) above sea level and the weather is cool and pleasant. There are places where road signs are put up to warn motorists of elephants crossing the road, as there is no dedicated grade-separated animal crossing provided.

While the highway was constructed as an entirely new route (except the former Perak State Route A171 section from Gerik to Kuala Rui that formed the pioneer route of the highway), the construction of the second phase involved acquisitions of several roads, namely Kedah State Route K171 (Kampung Sadek–Kampung Hangus), Kedah State Route K173 (Kampung Hangus–Kampung Kuala Kuang), Jalan Kampung Keda Kemangi (Kampung Kuala Kuang–Kampung Keda Kemangi), and Jalan Sungai Petani–Baling FT67 (Kupang–Kuala Pegang and Kuala Pegang–Tawar). As a result, the East–West Highway FT4 overlaps with Kedah State Route K171 (from Kampung Sadek to Kampung Hangus) and Jalan Sungai Petani–Baling FT67.

As the section of the highway from Kulim to Kupang was constructed back to back with the Butterworth–Kulim Expressway E15 and overlaps with the FT67 road, some maps incorrectly label the highway as either FT67 or E15. However, both route codes are incorrect, as the Sungai Seluang–Tawar section is not an expressway-standard road. The FT4 route code was only applied after the final section from Titi Karangan to Gerik was completed in 2005.

The completion of the highway will reduce transport costs and with this, the state of Kelantan can expect its tempo of development to be heightened, new towns and industrial areas will be developed. The highway will provide the access for the extraction of timber from the jungles along the road and help boost tourism among Malaysians as well as foreigners.

The highway is one of the most dangerous routes in Malaysia due to condition of the roads causing many records of traffic collision and natural disaster.

== History ==
=== Phase 1 (Gerik–Jeli, 1970–1982) ===
The construction of the East–West Highway FT4 was proposed by then first Malaysian Prime Minister, Tunku Abdul Rahman Putra Al-Haj in 1964. The highway was initially planned to be built from Sungai Siput, Perak to Kuala Berang, Terengganu before being changed to the present-day routing from Gerik to Jeli. The original plan was later being revived as the Second East–West Highway FT185, but with a slightly different western terminus at Simpang Pulai.

The construction of the East–West Highway FT4 began in the 1970 as a defence-related highway during the Communist insurgency in Malaysia (1968–89). The Malaysian Government, then, introduced a new strategy of fighting the Communist Party of Malaya (CPM). It was known as Security and Development, or KESBAN, the local acronym (Program Keselamatan dan Pembangunan), and focused on civil military affairs. Under KESBAN, the government made large efforts to develop rural areas with the implementation of massive development programs such as building roads, schools, hospitals, medical clinics, and public utilities like electricity and water supply.

In October 1969, the JKR was instructed to commence work on the Highway with immediate effect. In early 1970, work started, simultaneously from Gerik and Jeli even before any detailed design or investigations were carried out. Existing earth moving machines from the various states were deployed until new machines for the project were purchased. It was only in early 1973 that the full complement of machines and staff were available for the project to proceed. In the early stages, there was military presence in every kilometre. The road was built to cut off the Communist terrorist from the safe havens in Thailand.

Two base camps were constructed, one at the Gerik end and the other at the Jeli end. The whole construction staff and their families were housed at these camps. A pilot track was constructed to gain access to the forward areas. This was followed by jungle clearing work by the main earthworks teams. As work progressed and travel time between the work site and base camp increased, forward camps were set up to house the workers.

During construction, the highway was sabotaged and ambushed by the communist terrorists during the Communist insurgency from 1970 to 1982. Many of workers were killed and the bulldozers was seriously damaged. The worst incidents happened in two separate attacks by the communist terrorists 1974, resulting 3 deaths among the JKR workers and many construction machines were destroyed. The East–West Highway was put under strict security control by the Territorial Army Regiment of the Malaysian Army during construction and during the opening of the Highway on 1 July 1982. This military operation during construction of the Highway known as "Ops Pagar" (Operation Barrier). Motorists were allowed to use the Highway at daytime only due to security reasons. The military control of the Highway was lifted after the insurgency war was ended in 1989.

The East–West Highway FT4 was officially opened to motorists on 1 July 1982. The successful completion of the East–West Highway is the result of the sacrifice of workers who had to carry out their jobs under difficult and challenging conditions.

==== Chronology ====
- 26 April 1974 – Communist Party of Malaya (CPM) assault group attacked and destroyed the equipment used in building the East–West Highway, which delayed the completion of the project by two years.
- 23 May 1974 – Communist Party of Malaya (CPM) assault group attacked and destroyed the 63 bulldozers used in building the East–West Highway.
- 27 August 1974 – Communist Party of Malaya (CPM) assault group launch an ambush at East–West Highway, killing three Malaysian Public Works Department (JKR) workers and several others wounded.
- 15 August 1977 – Communist Party of Malaya (CPM) assault group launch an ambush at East–West Highway. Five soldiers from the 11th Battalion of the Askar Wataniah (Territorial Army) were ambushed by 30 Communist terrorist during left Post 8 for Post 5 on patrol and to obtain supplies.

=== Phase 2 (Kulim–Gerik, 1993–2005) ===
The East–West Highway FT4 was extended westwards as a part of the 1993 Malaysian Highway Network Development Plan, together with the construction of the Butterworth–Kulim Expressway E15. As a result, the end point of the highway at Sungai Seluang intersection forms the starting point of the Butterworth–Kulim Expressway. The Kulim–Baling section was constructed first, followed by the final section from Titi Karangan to Gerik, where the East–West Highway extension links with the original highway. Construction of the final section started in 2001 and was completed in 2005.

== Notable incidents ==
=== May 2025 baby elephant death ===
On 11 May 2025, a five-year-old baby elephant died after being hit by a lorry carrying chickens while attempting to cross the road on KM80 of the highway. A female elephant, believed to be the calf's mother, was seen nudging the lorry with her head in an attempt to rescue her baby. The Perak Wildlife and National Parks Department responded to the scene and had to tranquilize the mother three times before officers could relocate her back to the Royal Belum State Park safely, as she refused to move away from the lorry. The accident and footage of the mother nudging the lorry and refusing to leave, which unfolded on Mother's Day, triggered widespread outrage and sympathy online.

=== June 2025 Gerik bus crash ===
On 9 June 2025, 15 students from Sultan Idris Education University (UPSI) were killed and 33 others injured when a bus collided with an MPV on KM53 of the highway. The bus was returning to UPSI's Tanjong Malim campus after the Eid al-Adha holiday. The incident was the deadliest road accident in Malaysia since the 2013 Genting Highlands bus crash. The crash sparked nationwide mourning and renewed public concern over road safety conditions along the highway.

== Memorials ==
=== Malaysian Public Works Department (JKR) East–West Highway Monument ===
The Malaysian Public Works Department (JKR) East–West Highway Monument was erected at a site near Sri Banding Army Camp on 1 July 1982, where a raid by the communist terrorists that killed three JKR workers and injured some other workers, to commemorate those who died during construction of the East–West Highway with lake bridge. The plaques reads "Pengorbanan Dalam Kenangan, Jalan Raya Timur Barat (1970–1982)" ("The Greatest Sacrifice, East West Highway (1970–1982)"). In 2014, a reunion ceremony was held by JKR of Perak at the East–West Highway Monument to gather all former JKR workers that were involved during the construction of the highway.

In 2015, this monument was refurbished and later it was officially reopened on 2 July 2015 by the Works Minister, Datuk Seri Fadillah Yusof in conjunction of the highway's 33rd anniversary.

The inscription is written in Malay. The English version is reproduced below:

THE GREATEST SACRIFICE
EAST–WEST HIGHWAY
(1970–1982)

The East West Highway (Gerik–Jeli) was opened to traffic on 1st July 1982. Many lives have been lost during the construction which was implemented in 1970. Some people have died during work accidents and some people were attacked by communist terrorists.

At this location, about 63 bulldozers were blown up by the communist terrorists on 23 May 1974. At this location also three JKR workers were killed and several others wounded in an ambush on 27th August 1974. Several other attacks have occurred along the highway involving the JKR workers and security forces. We commemorate those who have sacrifice their lives for the construction of the East West Highway.

Please recite AL-FATIHAH* for those who lost their lives here.

Note: The word "AL-FATIHAH" is the first chapter of the Qur'an in Islam.

=== East–West Highway Memorial Gallery Banding ===
The East–West Highway Memorial Gallery Banding or Galeri Banding: Memori Lebuhraya Timur–Barat in Malay is a memorial gallery about the history of the construction of the East–West Highway. The gallery is set up at the former Malaysian Army military sentry bunker and situated near Belum Rainforest Resort and west side of Lake Temenggor Bridge at Pulau Banding. It was officially opened on 9 May 2014 by the sixth Malaysian Prime Minister, Najib Tun Razak. Many historical artifacts during Communist insurgency in Malaysia (1968–89) are exhibited here such as military bunkers, guard post replicas, weapons, uniforms and many more.

=== Malaysian Army Insurgency War Memorial ===
Other memorials include the Malaysian Army Insurgency War Memorial located at Dataran Juang in the Kem Tentera Darat Banding army camp not far from Lake Temenggor Bridge. This memorial was erected on 5 June 2009 to commemorate 116 soldiers who died during the communist insurgency from 1968 to 1989. The armoured vehicle at this memorial is a V-150 Commando armoured car of the Malaysian Army which was used during the insurgency.

== Specifications ==
There are five major bridges along the Highway. Two of the bridges including the longest, the Lake Temenggor Bridge, span arms of the lake formed by the Temenggor Dam Project. The bridges were designed by ENEX of New Zealand under the Colombo Plan Aid. Construction of three of the bridges were undertaken by a foreign contractor while a joint venture between two local firms undertook the construction of the remaining two bridges. In addition to the above, there are about 280 culverts constructed mainly by departmental workers.

Constructing the highway was challenging for the JKR. There were many constraints, which slowed down progress. Some 27.5 million cubic metres of earth was required to be cut to construct the highway, of this over 3.8 million cubic metres was rock, which required drilling and blasting operations for its removal. Hill cuts of over 60 m (200 ft) and valleys over 100 m (330 ft) deep, which required filling, was found at many locations. The intensity of the monsoon rains especially in the forward areas reduced time available for construction to 10 months in a year. The East–West Highway is located close to the Malaysia–Thailand border and is situated in a Security Area. As a result, several measures had to be taken and procedures adopted to ensure the safety of the workers and the machines. These too contributed to some delay. The 116-kilometre-long (72 mi) highway, which links the East Coast at Jeli, Kelantan with the West Coast at Gerik, Perak cost RM 396 million. Other details of the project are as follows:

=== Major bridges span ===
1. Sungai Rui Bridge: 256m
2. Lake Temenggor Bridge (West side): 880 m
3. Lake Temenggor Bridge (East side): 640 m
4. Upper Sungai Pergau Bridge: 159 m
5. Lower Sungai Pergau Bridge: 158 m

=== Road design criteria ===
- Design speed: 80 km/h
- Maximum Gradient: 7%
- Pavement Width: 7.2 m
- Shoulder Width: 2.3 m

== Features ==
- There is two semi tunnel on the highway. It is the first ever built in Malaysia. The first one located on the east side of Lake Temenggor, near Perak-Kelantan. The new second one located on the west side of Lake Temenggor, .
- There are many military sentry bunkers along the highway especially at Lake Temenggor and Banding Island area.
- There are nine rest and service area along the highway. In Tawar, Sirabayas, Bintang Hijau, Perah (Gerik), Sungai Lebey, Pulau Banding, Air Banun, Titiwangsa (1,050 m [3,440 ft] above sea level) and Damai.
- The Titiwangsa Rest and Service Area is the highest point of the East–West Highway, with an altitude of 1,050 m (3,440 ft) above sea level.
- Elephant crossing on the road.
- Belum Eco Viaduct.

=== Concurrency ===
State	Number	Name	Section
Kedah	FT 67	Malaysia Federal Route 67	Tawar-Kupang
Kedah	K171	Kedah State Route K171	Kampung Sadek-Kampung Hangus

== Titiwangsa Rest and Service Area ==
Titiwangsa
- Interactive map of Titiwangsa
- Elevation: 1,050 m (3,445 ft)
- Traversed by: FT 4
- Location: Gerik, Perak, Malaysia
- Range: Titiwangsa Mountains
- Coordinates: 5.606090°N 101.5424241°E

Titiwangsa Rest and Service Area is a mountain pass and rest area, it is the highest point along the East-West Highway. It is named after the mountain range it is located on, the Titiwangsa Mountains.

== Junction and town lists ==
Legend:

- I/C - Interchange, I/S - Intersection, RSA - Rest and service area, OBR - Overhead bridge restaurant, R/R - Restaurant and rest plaza, L/B - Layby, V/P - Vista point, TN - tunnel, T/P - Toll plaza, BR - Bridge
- C - Cloverleaf, S - Stack, T-A - Trumpet-A, T-B - Trumpet-B, DT - Directional-T/Y, SDT - Semi-Directional-T/Y, P-Y - Partial-Y, D - Diamond, P-C - Partial cloverleaf, D-D - Diverging diamond, D-R - Direct ramp

State	District	Location	km	mi	Exit	Name	Destinations	Notes
Kedah	Kulim	Kulim			Through to Butterworth–Kulim Expressway / FT 4 / AH140			
Kedah	Kulim	Kulim				Kulim Hi-Tech Park I/S	FT 3053 Jalan Kulim Hi-Tech – Kulim Hi-Tech, Sungai Kob, Karangan	
Kedah	Kulim	Kulim				Inokom car assembly plant		
Kedah	Kulim	Kulim				Kampung Padang Meha I/S	K805 Jalan Kampung Sungai Karangan – Kampung Padang Meha, Kampung Sungai Karangan	
Kedah	Kulim	Kulim			Sungai Karangan bridge			
Kedah	Kulim	Kulim				Desa Aman		
Kedah	Kulim	Kulim				Jubai I/S	K806 Kedah State Route K806 – Jubai, Kampung Keda Bagan Sena	
Kedah	Kulim	Kulim			Sungai Sedim bridge			
Kedah	Baling	Kejai				Kejai I/S	K825 Kedah State Route K825 – Kejai, Kampung Kuala Bakong, Kuala Ketil	
Kedah	Baling	Kejai				Kampung Batu 7 I/S	K19 Kedah State Route K19 – Sungai Petani, Kuala Ketil, Bakai	
Kedah	Baling	Tawar			Tawar RSA (westbound)			
Kedah	Baling	Tawar				Tawar I/S	FT 67 Jalan Kuala Ketil – Sungai Petani, Kuala Ketil	Overlaps with FT67
Kedah	Baling	Kuala Pegang				Kampung Keda Keledang I/S	K714 Kedah State Route K714 – Kampung Padang Setol, Kampung Jerai	Overlaps with FT67
Kedah	Baling	Kuala Pegang				Kuala Pegang (West) I/S	FT 67 Jalan Kuala Ketil (old road) – Kuala Pegang	Overlaps with FT67
Kedah	Baling	Kuala Pegang				Kuala Pegang (East) I/S	FT 67 Jalan Kuala Ketil (old road) – Kuala Pegang	Overlaps with FT67
Kedah	Baling	Kupang				Kupang I/S	FT 67 Jalan Kuala Ketil – Kupang, Baling, Sik, Pengkalan Hulu	Overlaps with FT67
Kedah	Baling	Kupang			Caltex L/B (eastbound)			
Kedah	Baling	Kupang				Kampung Sadek I/S	K171 Kedah State Route K171 – Kupang, Baling	Overlaps with K171
Kedah	Baling	Kupang				Kampung Charok Rambai I/S	K711 Kedah State Route K711 – Kampung Charok Rambai, Kampung Sera, Baling	Overlaps with K171
Kedah	Baling	Kupang				Kampung Pisang I/S	K713 Kedah State Route K713 – Kampung Jerai, Kampung Padang Setol	Overlaps with K171
Kedah	Baling	Kupang				Kampung Hangus I/S	K171 Kedah State Route K171 – Kampung Iboi, Kampung Bok Bak, Kampung Tanjung Luas	Overlaps with K171
Kedah	Baling	Kupang				Kampung Tiak		
Kedah	Baling	Kupang				Kampung Kuala Kuang I/S	K158 Kedah State Route K158 – Kampung Bok Bak; K173 Kedah State Route K173 – Kampung Tanjung Nering, Kampung Seneyit, Kampung Charok Pendiat	
Kedah	Baling	Kupang				Kampung Keda Kemangi I/S	Jalan Kampung Keda Kemangi – Kampung Keda Kemangi	
Kedah	Baling	Kupang			Sirabayas RSA (westbound)			
Kedah	Baling	Kupang			Viaduct			
Perak	Hulu Perak	Gerik			Bintang Hijau RSA (eastbound)			
Perak	Hulu Perak	Gerik				Tanjung Kala I/S	A167 Perak State Route A167 – Kampung Tanjung Kala, Gerik town centre	
Perak	Hulu Perak	Gerik				Gerik I/S (Kampung Baharu Batu Dua I/S)	FT 76 Jalan Kuala Kangsar–Baling – Gerik town centre, Lenggong, Kuala Kangsar, Baling, Pengkalan Hulu	
Perak	Hulu Perak	Gerik				Gerik I/S (Batu Empat I/S)	FT 4 East–West Highway (old road) – Gerik town centre, Lenggong, Kuala Kangsar, Baling, Pengkalan Hulu	
Perak	Hulu Perak	Gerik			Malaysian Public Works Department (JKR) East–West Highway Base Camp			
Perak	Hulu Perak	Gerik			Perah RSA (eastbound)			
Perak	Hulu Perak	Gerik				Kuala Rui I/S	A171 Perak State Route A171 – Kg. Baharu Kuala Rui, Bersia Dam and Hydroelectric Station, Temenggor Dam and Hydroelectric Station	
Perak	Hulu Perak	Gerik				Kuala Rui Malaysian Army Camp	Kuala Rui Malaysian Army Camp	
Perak	Hulu Perak	Gerik			Sungai Rui bridge Length: 256 m			
Perak	Hulu Perak	Gerik			Shell L/B (westbound)			
Perak	Hulu Perak	Temengor				Kampung Bendariang I/S	Jalan Felda Bersia – Felda Bersia, Kg. Baharu Kuala Rui, Bersia Dam and Hydroelectric Station, Temenggor Dam and Hydroelectric Station	
Perak	Hulu Perak	Temengor			JPJ Enforcement Station (eastbound)			
Perak	Hulu Perak	Temengor			Sungai Lebey RSA (eastbound)			
Perak	Hulu Perak	Temengor			Malaysian Public Works Department (JKR) East–West Highway Monument; Historical site during insurgency			
Perak	Hulu Perak	Temengor				Banding Lakeside Inn I/S	Banding Lakeside Inn	
Perak	Hulu Perak	Temengor				Banding Malaysian Army Camp	Banding Malaysian Army Camp – Dataran Juang Insurgency War Memorial V	
Perak	Hulu Perak	Temengor			West Lake Temenggor bridge Length: 880 m			
Perak	Hulu Perak	Temengor			East–West Highway Memorial Gallery Banding (former military sentry bunker); Historical site during insurgency			
Perak	Hulu Perak	Temengor				Belum Rainforest Resort I/S	Belum Rainforest Resort	
Perak	Hulu Perak	Temengor				Banding Island	Banding Rainforest Research Centre, Temenggor Lake Jetty, Banding Island Resort; Banding Island RSA (eastbound)	
Perak	Hulu Perak	Temengor			East Lake Temenggor bridge Length: 640 m			
Perak	Hulu Perak	Temengor			Air Banun RSA (eastbound)			
Perak	Hulu Perak	Temengor			Belum Eco Viaduct			
Perak	Hulu Perak	Temengor			Titiwangsa RSA (eastbound); 1,050 m above sea level			
Perak–Kelantan border					East–West Highway semi tunnel			
Kelantan	Jeli	Jeli			Pos Galeri Malaysian Army Camp (westbound)			
Kelantan	Jeli	Jeli			Damai RSA (westbound)			
Kelantan	Jeli	Jeli				TNB Pergau Dam		
Kelantan	Jeli	Jeli			Upper Sungai Pergau bridge Length: 159 m			
Kelantan	Jeli	Jeli				Kampung Lawar I/S	FT 205 Federal Route 205 – Kampung Lawar, Batu Melintang, Kampung Kalai	
Kelantan	Jeli	Jeli			Lower Sungai Pergau bridge Length: 158 m			
Kelantan	Jeli	Jeli			Caltex L/B (eastbound)			
Kelantan	Jeli	Jeli				Batu Melintang I/S	FT 205 Federal Route 205 – Kampung Lawar, Batu Melintang, Kampung Kalai, Gua Reng (Reng Caves)	
Kelantan	Jeli	Jeli				FELCRA Tumbi Rapat		
Kelantan	Jeli	Jeli				Cure and Care Rehabilitation Centre	Cure and Care Rehabilitation Centre	
Kelantan	Jeli	Jeli			Through to FT 4 (Jalan Pasir Puteh–Machang–Jeli) / AH140			
1.000 mi = 1.609 km; 1.000 km = 0.621 mi: Concurrency terminus

== Commemorative events ==
=== The East–West Highway commemorative postage stamps ===
The commemorative postage stamps to mark the opening of the East–West Highway on 1982 were issued by then the Malaysian Postal Services Department (now Pos Malaysia) on 1 July 1983, one year after the opening ceremony of the highway. The denominations for these stamps were 15 cents, 20 cents, and RM 1.00.

== See also ==
- Second East–West Highway
