= Banding Island =

Island in Malaysia

Native name: Pulau Banding ڤولاو بنديڠ 万汀岛
- Interactive map of Banding Island

Geography
- Location: Temenggor Lake
- Coordinates: 5°33′N 101°20′E
- Area: 2.84 km^{2} (1.10 sq mi)

Administration
- Malaysia
- State: Perak
- District: Hulu Perak
- Mukim: Temengor

Banding Island (locally known as Pulau Banding) is an artificial island within the man-made Temenggor Lake, created by the construction of Temenggor Dam in Perak, Malaysia. It is connected to both sides of the lake by the Temenggor Lake Bridge, part of the East-West Highway. A tropical rainforest research centre was set up on the island by Universiti Malaysia Kelantan in collaboration with Pulau Banding Foundation (founded on 7 November 2007).
