= Lenggong (town) =

Mukim in Hulu Perak, Perak, Malaysia

- Town

- Seal

- Location within Malaysia
- Coordinates: 5°6′37″N 100°58′8″E
- Country: Malaysia
- State: Perak
- District: Hulu Perak

Government
  - Type: Local government
  - Body: Lenggong District Council
  - President: Mohd Amzari Mohd Arzami
- Time zone: UTC+8 (Malaysian Standard Time)
- Website: www.mdlg.gov.my

Lenggong District Council Majlis Daerah Lenggong مجليس دايره لڠڬوڠ
- Local Government Act 1976

Type
- Type: Municipal Council of Lenggong

History
- Founded: 1 December 1979

Leadership
- President: Mohd Amzari Mohd Arzami

Motto
- Bersatu Teguh; Firmly United

Meeting place
- Jalan Alang Iskandar, 33400, Lenggong, Perak Darul Ridzuan

Website
- www.mdlg.gov.my

Lenggong (Jawi: لڠڬوڠ) is a town, a mukim and a parliamentary constituency in Hulu Perak District, Perak, Malaysia.The town of Lenggong is situated some 100 kilometres north of Ipoh on the Kuala Kangsar to Grik road (highway 76). The road to Lenggong is surrounded mostly by oil palm estates and jungles.

== Geography ==
Lenggong is situated in the Lenggong Valley, sandwiched between the Bintang and Titiwangsa Ranges. It is a rural area, with small kampongs surrounded by green vegetation and limestone hills with numerous caves. The Lenggong Valley is one of Peninsular Malaysia's most important areas for archaeology, as excavations have revealed many traces of Malaysia's prehistory, with finds such as cave drawings, jewellery, pottery, weapons and stone tools. It is the site of one of the oldest known place of human activity in the Peninsula. The Lenggong Valley was listed by UNESCO as a World Heritage Site on 30 June 2012.

== Cuisine ==
Lenggong is also famous for its freshwater fish dishes. One local delicacy from freshwater fish is pekasam, where the fish is marinated in salt and toasted rice, followed by fermentation for two weeks. Another specialty of Lenggong is the fruit salad kebebe.
