= Husairi Ariffin =

Malaysian politician

Yang Berhormat Tuan Husairi Ariffin MLA
- حسيري عارفين

Member of the Perak State Legislative Assembly for Kenering
- Incumbent
- Assumed office 19 November 2022
- Preceded by: Mohd Tarmizi Idris (BN–UMNO)
- Majority: 765 (2022)

Personal details
- Born: Husairi bin Ariffin; 13 March 1966 (age 60) Lenggong, Perak, Malaysia
- Party: Malaysian Islamic Party (PAS)
- Other political affiliations: Perikatan Nasional (PN)
- Spouse: Fauziah Musa
- Children: 5

Husairi bin Ariffin (born 13 March 1966) is a Malaysian politician who served as Member of the Perak State Legislative Assembly (MLA) for Kenering since November 2022. He is a member of Malaysian Islamic Party (PAS), a component party of Perikatan Nasional (PN).

== Election results ==
Perak State Legislative Assembly
| Year | Constituency | Candidate | Votes | Pct | Opponent(s) | Votes | Pct | Ballots cast | Majority | Turnout |
|---|---|---|---|---|---|---|---|---|---|---|
| 2022 | N03 Kenering | Husairi Ariffin (PAS) | 7,664 | 46.99% | Rohaida Mohamad Yaakub (UMNO) | 6,901 | 42.31% | 17,048 | 763 | 77.23% |
| 2022 | N03 Kenering | Husairi Ariffin (PAS) | 7,664 | 46.99% | Mohamad Jamean Zulkepli (AMANAH) | 1,745 | 10.70% | 17,048 | 763 | 77.23% |
