= Perak River =

River in Perak, Malaysia

Coordinates: 4°01′N 100°47′E

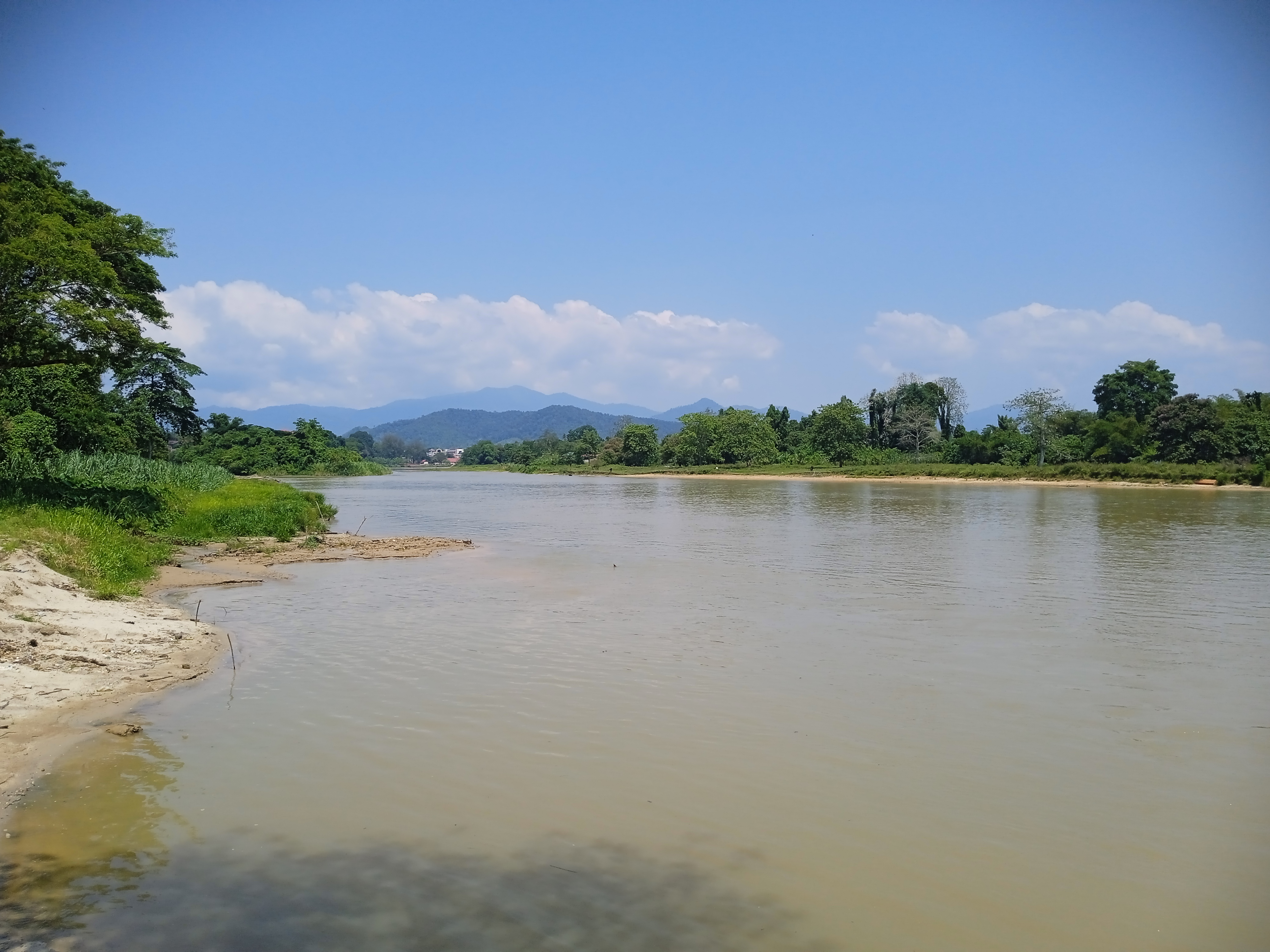
- The river at Jalan Istana spur, Kuala Kangsar District
- Native name: Sungai Perak (Malay)

Location
- Country: Malaysia
- State(s): Perak

Physical characteristics
- Source: Titiwangsa Mountains
  - location: Perak-Kelantan-Thailand border tripoint, Royal Belum State Park, Hulu Perak District
- Mouth: Strait of Malacca
  - location: Bagan Datuk, Bagan Datuk District
- Length: 400 km (250 mi)
- Basin size: 14,900 km^{2} (5,800 sq mi)

The Perak River (Malay: Sungai Perak) is the second longest river in Peninsular Malaysia after the Pahang River.

A number of towns are on the banks of the river including the royal town of Kuala Kangsar. Most of the settlements in what is today Perak were situated near the river until the 19th century, when tin deposits were discovered elsewhere, most notably Ipoh.

== History ==
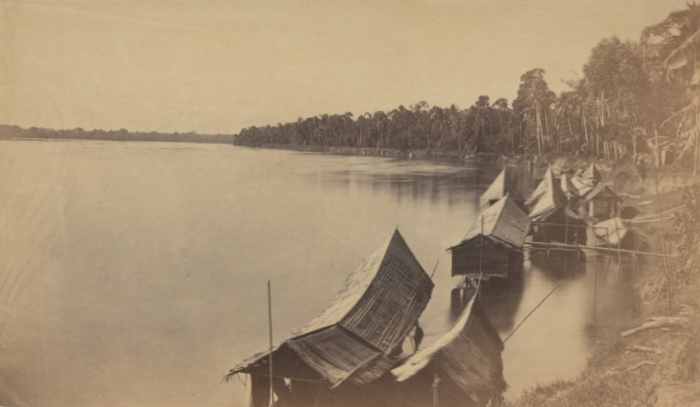
View of Perak River at Bota (Bhota) in 1874.

One of the streams that flows into the Perak River is known locally as the Sungai Kangsar (Kangsar River). The portion that enjoins the main Perak River is known as Kuala. Overlooking the river bank there is a hill where the British Resident for Perak resided and appropriately named as Bukit Residen (Residence Hill). During the British occupation the British Resident being Advisor to the Sultan will conduct the Council Meeting with the Sultan and Chieftains from the districts at Bukit Residen. The council meeting was usually a pompous event with Chieftains coming with sailing boats and the Royalty and palace officials came riding on elephants. The subjects camped at the foot of the Bukit Residen for days as the Council Meeting was usually more than three days. For the subjects the Council meeting was a festival where they congregated at river bank. The subjects and locals had free flows of food and cultural activities at the river bank. Thus the local dialects named the confluence of Kangsar River and Perak River as Kuala Kangsar, Kangsar was coined from the word Council and Kuala means confluence of river.

== Literature ==
The Perak is mentioned in Rudyard Kipling's story The Crab That Played with the Sea (published as one of the Just So Stories). There, the man complains to his creator, the eldest magician, about the tides running into and out from the Perak: "Once a day and once a night the Sea runs up the Perak river and drives the sweet-water back into the forest, so that my house is made wet; once a day and once a night it runs down the river and draws all the water after it, so that there is nothing left but mud, and my canoe is upset."

== Course ==
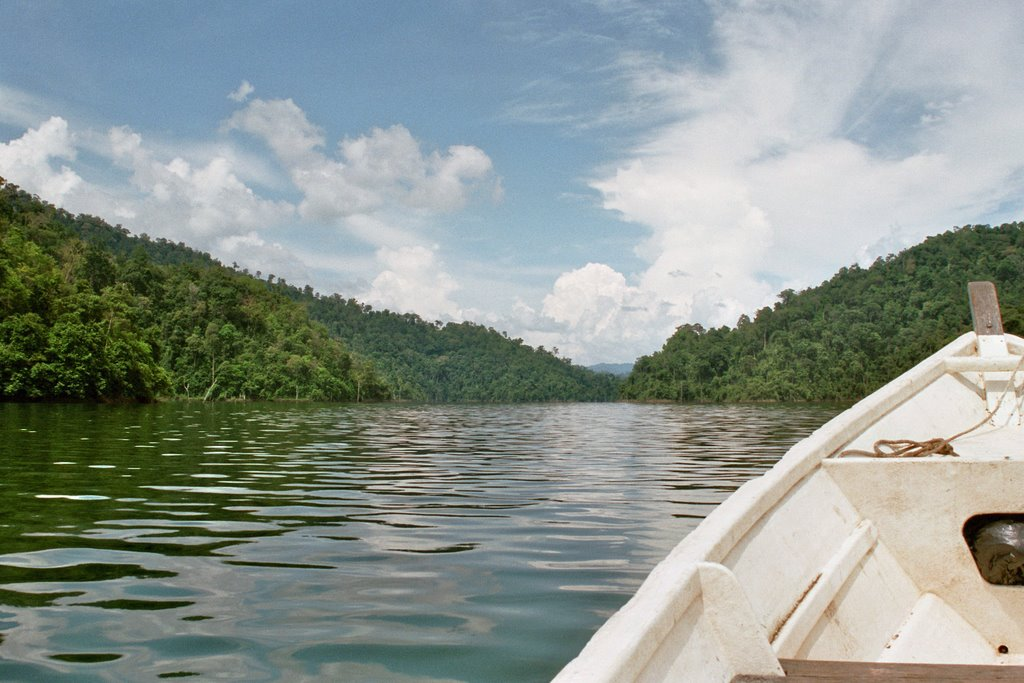
The Temenggor Dam impounds the upper reaches of the Perak, creating the Temenggor Lake.

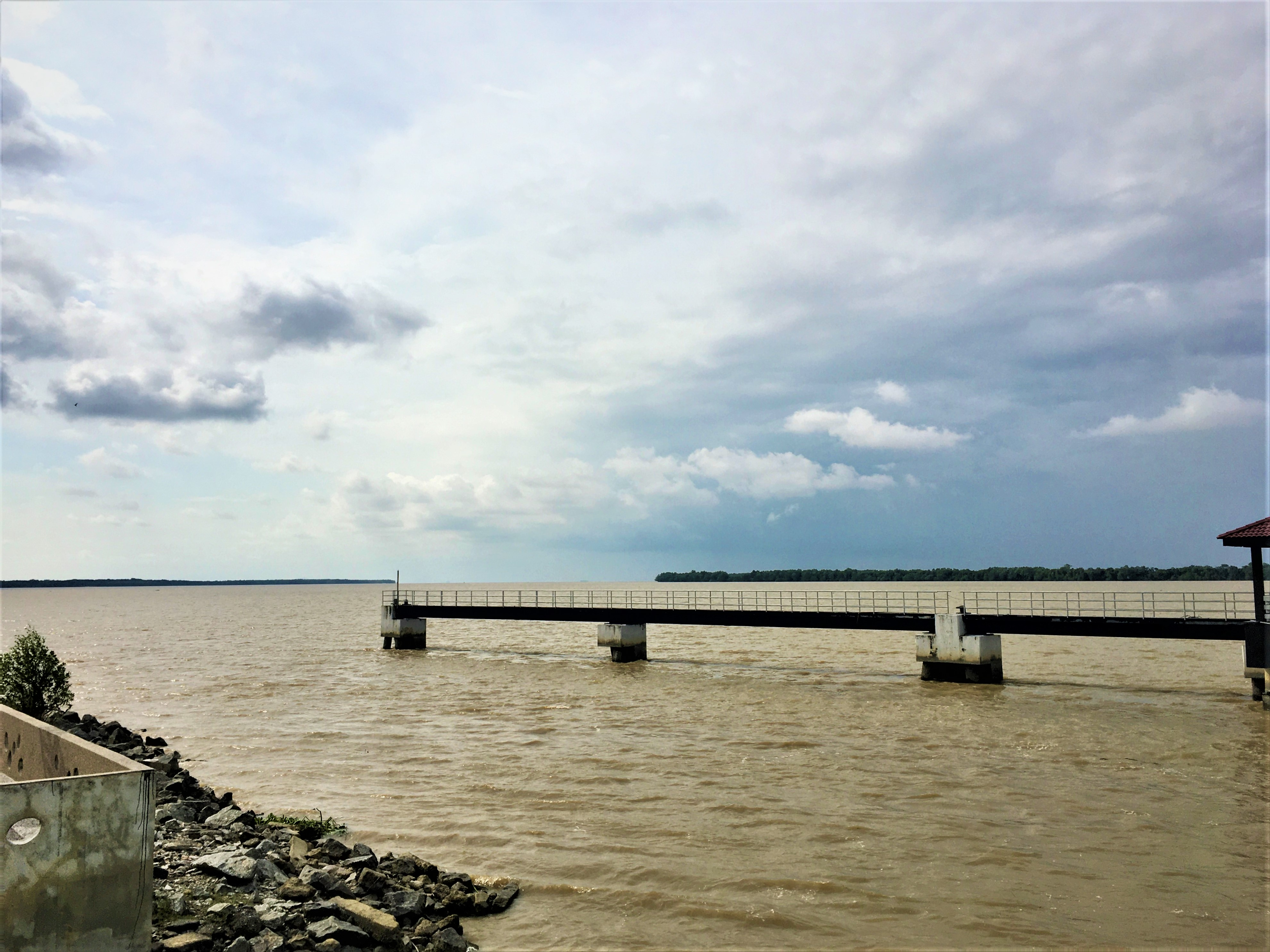
The mouth near Bagan Datuk.

The Perak River is the second-longest river in peninsular Malaysia, covering an overall length of 400 kilometres (250 mi).

The source of Perak River is in the Perak–Kelantan–Thailand border tripoint near the Royal Belum State Park, in the Titiwangsa Mountains. To be exact, the confluence of the Machang and Merah Rivers, deep in the remote area of Royal Belum State Park. The Machang River originated from the Titiwangsa along the Perak–Kelantan border, while the Merah River started from the upper stream near Bang Lang National Park in the Sankalakhiri Range of Yala province on the Thai side. The confluence of these rivers forms the headwater of the Perak. It then flows southwest through the district of Hulu Perak, mainly in the vicinities of Gerik and Lenggong, before meeting with the Kangsar River at the royal seat of Kuala Kangsar, in its eponymous district. It then enters the Perak Tengah district, snaking through the towns of Parit, Pasir Salak and Kampung Gajah, before emptying into the Straits of Malacca near Bagan Datuk in Bagan Datuk District.

=== Basin extent and tributaries ===
The Perak River basin encompasses almost all districts of Perak, except for Kerian and Larut, Matang and Selama, as the Bintang Mountains serves as a drainage divide between the Kerian River basin in the west and the Perak River in the east. The river has many tributaries, including Bidor River and the Kinta River.

== Towns along the river basin ==
- Gerik
- Lenggong
- Sungai Siput
- Karai
- Kuala Kangsar
- Manong
- Parit
- Kampung Gajah
- Pasir Salak
- Teluk Intan
- Bagan Datuk

== Gallery ==
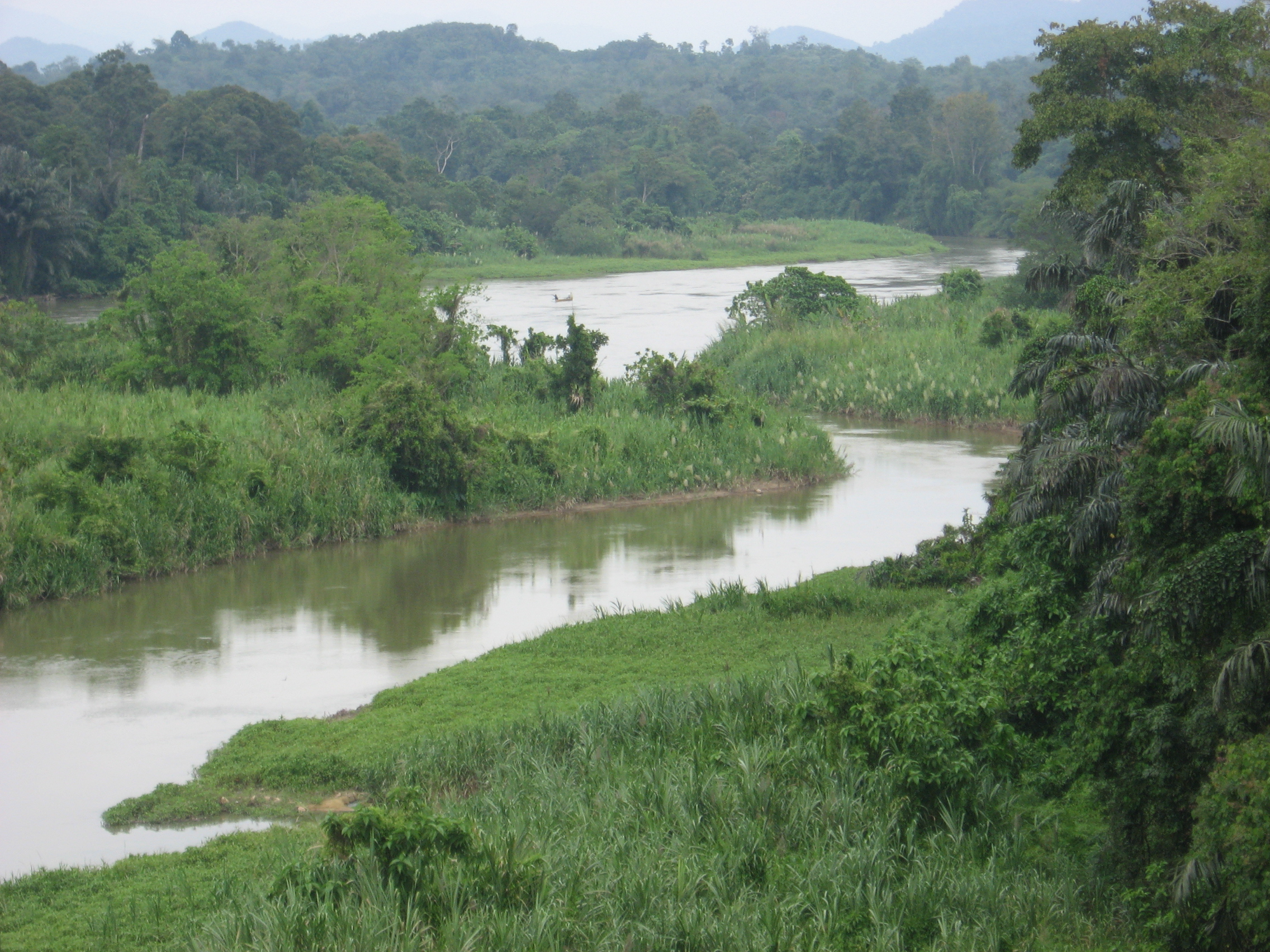
Perak River seen from the North–South Expressway Northern Route

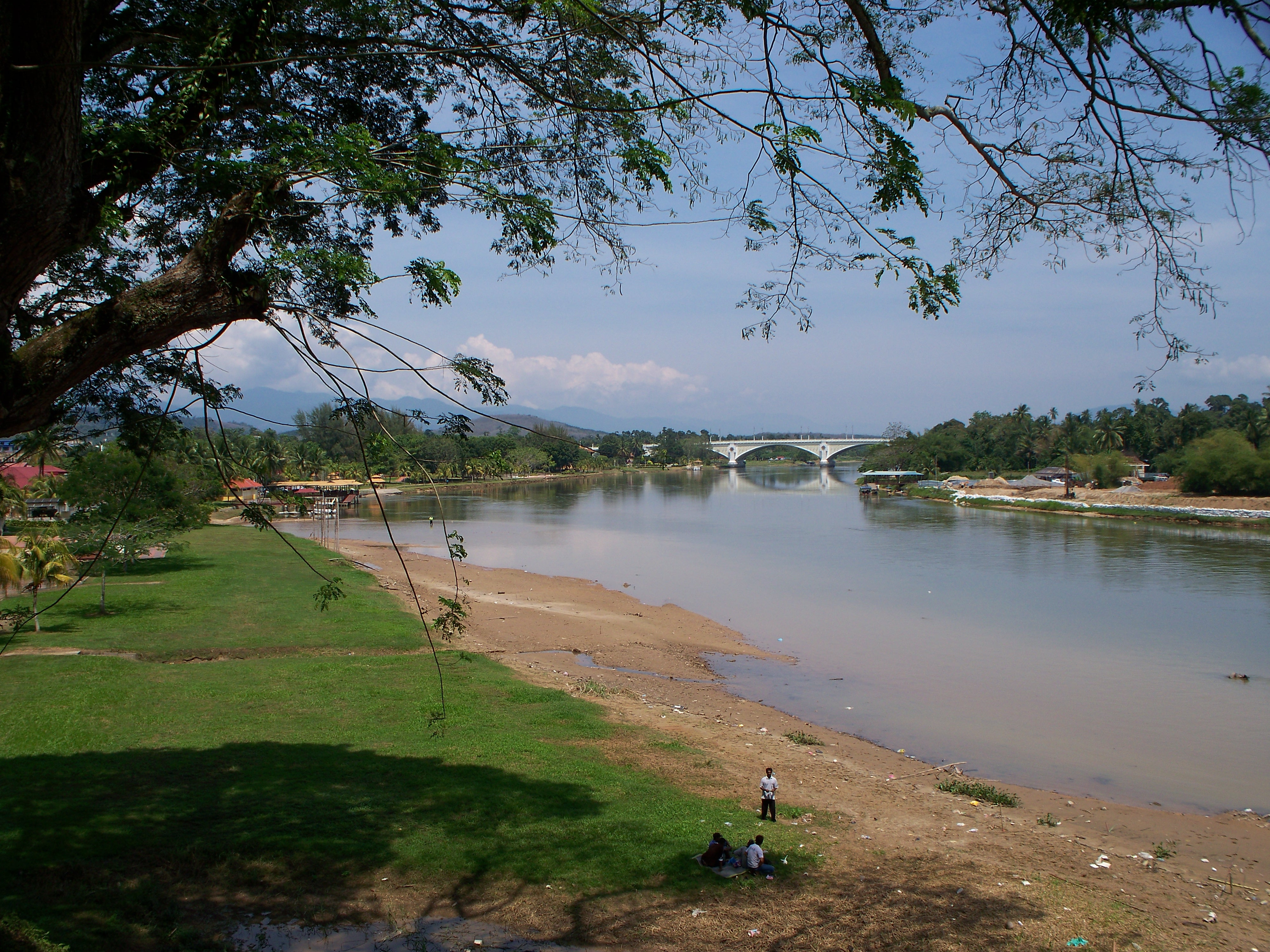
The river in Kuala Kangsar

Sultan Abdul Jalil Bridge, Kuala Kangsar

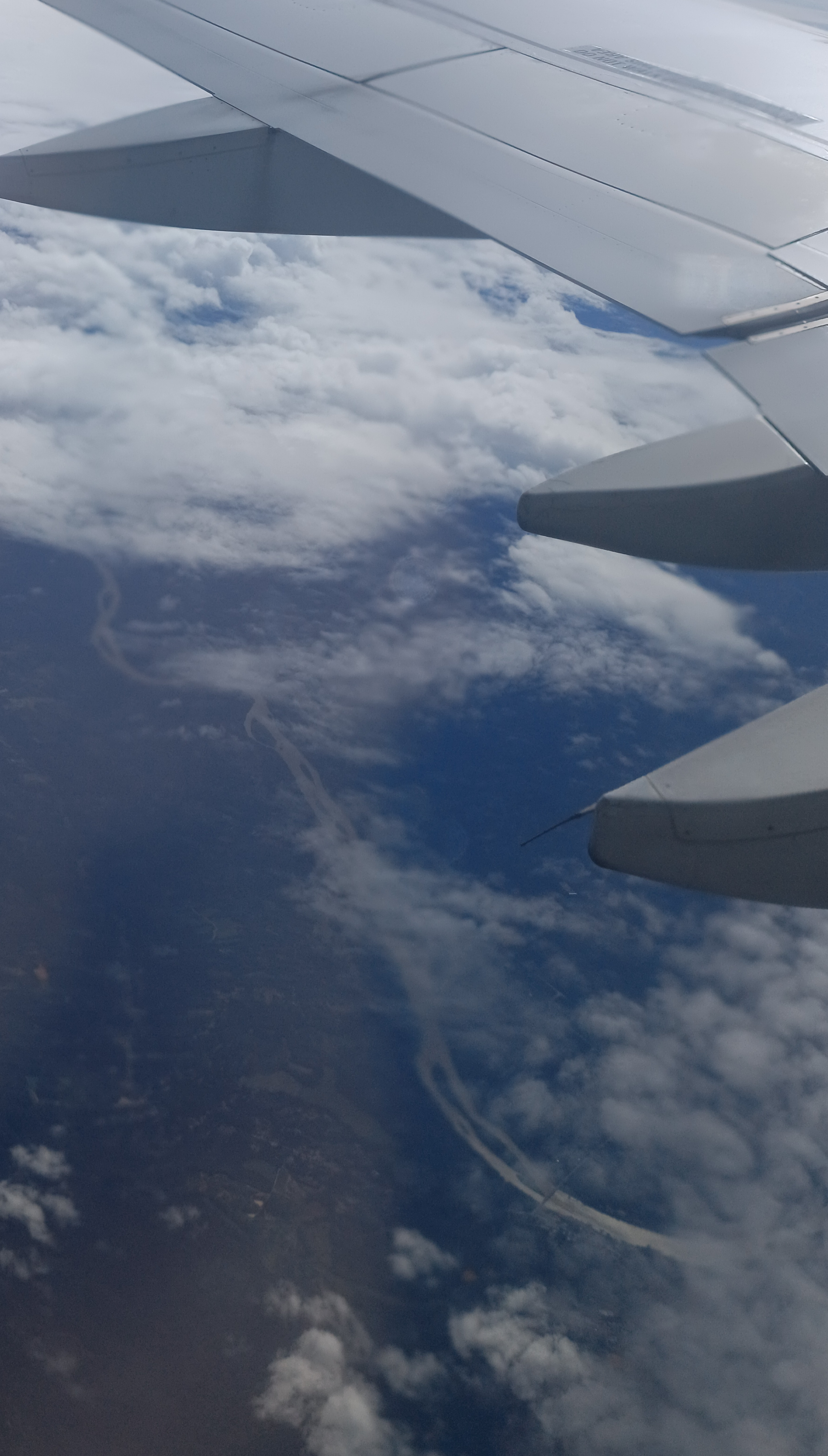
Aerial photo of Perak river near Parit

== See also ==
- Geography of Malaysia
- List of rivers of Malaysia
