= Lenggong (disambiguation) =

Lenggong may refer to:

- Lenggong (town), a town in Perak, Malaysia
- Lenggong (federal constituency)

== See also ==
- Lenggong bent-toed gecko, a species of gecko that is endemic to peninsular Malaysia.
