= Perak State Route A171 =

Road in Malaysia

Perak Route 171
- Jalan Temenggor

Major junctions
- West end: Kuala Rui
- FT 4 East-West Highway
- West end: Temenggor Dam

Location
- Country: Malaysia
- Primary destinations: Kampung Bendang Riang; Kampung Bersia Lama

Highway system
- Highways in Malaysia; Expressways; Federal; State

Jalan Temenggor (Perak state route A171) is a major road in Perak, Malaysia. It connects Kuala Rui with Kampung Bendang Riang, Bersia, and Temenggor Dam.

== List of junctions ==
Km	Exit	Junctions	To	Remarks
		Kuala Rui	FT 4 AH140 East-west Highway West; FT 4 AH140 Gerik; FT 76 Pengkalan Hulu; FT 76 Baling; FT 76 Lenggong; FT 76 Kuala Kangsar East; FT 4 AH140 Jeli; FT 4 AH140 Tanah Merah; FT 4 AH140 Machang; FT 8 Kota Bahru	T-junctions
		Kampung Baharu Kuala Rui		
		Sungai Rui bridge		
		Forest Ranger Office		
		Kampung Bendang Riang	North; Jalan Bersia; Bersia FT 4 AH140 East-west Highway West; FT 4 AH140 Gerik; FT 76 Pengkalan Hulu; FT 76 Baling; FT 76 Lenggong; FT 76 Kuala Kangsar East; FT 4 AH140 Jeli; FT 4 AH140 Tanah Merah; FT 4 AH140 Machang; FT 8 Kota Bahru	T-junctions
		Kampung Bersia Lama		
		Sultan Azlan Shah Bersia Dam and Hydroelectric Station	Sultan Azlan Shah Bersia Dam and Hydroelectric Station; Main Hydroelectric Dam	T-junctions; Restricted area
		Lake Bersia	V	
Temenggor Dam and Hydroelectric Station; Restricted area
		Temenggor Dam and Hydroelectric Station	Temenggor Dam and Hydroelectric Station; Main Hydroelectric Dam; Main Intake	Restricted area
