= Mount Bintang =

Mountain in Malaysia

- Location within Malaysia

Highest point
- Elevation: 1,862 m (6,109 ft)
- Prominence: 1,566 m (5,138 ft)
- Listing: Ultra; Ribu
- Coordinates: 5°25′45″N 100°52′00″E

Naming
- Native name: Gunung Bintang (Malay)

Geography
- Location: Kulim and Baling Districts, Kedah; Larut, Matang and Selama and Hulu Perak Districts, Perak
- Parent range: Bintang Mountains

Mount Bintang (Malay: Gunung Bintang) is a mountain on the border of the states of Kedah and Perak in the Bintang Mountains, Malaysia, specifically on the quadripoint between the districts of Kulim, Baling, Larut, Matang and Selama and Hulu Perak. Its summit is 1,862 m (6,109 ft) above sea level. It is the highest mountain in the state of Kedah.

== See also ==
- List of ultras of Southeast Asia
