= Mohd Tarmizi Idris =

Malaysian politician

Yang Berbahagia Dato' Mohd Tarmizi Idris DPMP AMN
- محمد ترمذي إدريس

Member of the Perak State Legislative Assembly for Kenering
- In office 21 March 2004 – 19 November 2022
- Preceded by: Tajol Rosli Mohd Ghazali (BN–UMNO)
- Succeeded by: Husairi Ariffin (PN–PAS)

Personal details
- Born: Mohd Tarmizi bin Idris
- Citizenship: Malaysian
- Party: UMNO
- Other political affiliations: Barisan Nasional
- Occupation: Politician

Mohd Tarmizi bin Idris is a Malaysian politician who served as Member of the Perak State Legislative Assembly (MLA) for Kenering from March 2004 to November 2022. He is a member of the United Malays National Organisation (UMNO), a component party of the Barisan Nasional (BN) coalition.

== Politics ==
He is the Deputy Chairman of UMNO Lenggong branch and the Chairman of Yayasan Perak.

== Election results ==
Perak State Legislative Assembly
Year	Constituency	Candidate	Votes	Pct	Opponent(s)	Votes	Pct	Ballots cast	Majority	Turnout
2004	N03 Kenering	Mohd Tarmizi Idris (UMNO)	5,823	65.25%	Mohd Sukri Ahmad (PAS)	2,968	33.26%	8,924	2,855	73.25%
2008	N03 Kenering	Mohd Tarmizi Idris (UMNO)	6,134	64.77%	Mohd Sukri Ahmad (PAS)	3,336	35.23%	9,646	2,798	76.73%
2013	N03 Kenering	Mohd Tarmizi Idris (UMNO)	8,216	60.43%	Mohamad Tarmizi Abdul Hamid (PKR)	4,881	35.90%	13,597	3,335	85.90%
2018	N03 Kenering	Mohd Tarmizi Idris (UMNO)	7,379	54.17%	Azhar Rasdi (PAS)	4,111	30.18%	13,622	3,268	80.29%
2018	N03 Kenering	Mohd Tarmizi Idris (UMNO)	7,379	54.17%	Noor Sham Abu Samah (PKR)	1,832	13.45%	13,622	3,268	80.29%

== Honours ==
- Malaysia
  - Member of the Order of the Defender of the Realm (AMN) (2007)
- Perak
  - Knight Commander of the Order of the Perak State Crown (DPMP) – Dato' (2009)
