= Temenggor Lake Bridge =

Temenggor Lake Bridge Jambatan Tasik Temenggor
- Coordinates: 5°33′01″N 101°20′59″E
- Carries: Motor vehicles
- Crosses: Temenggor Lake
- Locale: Federal Route 4 East-West Highway, Perak
- Official name: Temenggor Lake Bridge
- Maintained by: Malaysian Public Works Department (JKR) Hulu Perak; Belati Wangsa Sdn Bhd

Characteristics
- Design: double box girder bridge
- Total length: 880 m (West side); 640 m (East side)
- Width: --
- Longest span: --

History
- Designer: Government of Malaysia; Malaysian Public Works Department (JKR); ENEX of New Zealand
- Constructed by: Malaysian Public Works Department (JKR)
- Opened: 1982

Location
- Interactive map of Temenggor Lake Bridge

Temenggor Lake Bridge is the longest highway bridge on the East-West Highway, (Federal Route 4). Opened on 1 July 1982, the bridge crosses Temenggor Lake, which was created after the construction of Temenggor hydroelectric dam in Perak, Malaysia. There are two sections of the bridge, in west side (880 metres) and east side (640 metres).

== See also ==
- Transport in Malaysia
