= Bukit Bunuh =

Place in Perak, Malaysia

- Kill Hill
- Location within Malaysia

Highest point
- Elevation: 180 m (590 ft)
- Coordinates: 5°04′30″N 100°58′30″E

Geography
- Location: Perak, Malaysia

Bukit Bunuh is a 180 m (590 ft) hill located within an oil palm plantation in Perak, Malaysia. The site is of geological and palaeoarchaeological interest.

The 4 km^{2} (1.5 sq mi) area showed existence of the species Homo erectus dating over 1.83 million years ago. The area was surveyed by archeologists in the 1980s but evidence of prehistoric human civilisation was discovered in 2001 when agricultural activities uncovered impactite—rocks modified or created from a suspected meteorite impacts. In 2009, the discovery of a hand axes was announced. The area is currently the oldest known workshop for crafting tools prior to 1.83 million years ago.

An impact event has been proposed to have destroyed the area's Paleolithic culture 1.83 million years ago. Geological evidence of an impact event was the presence of suevite and impact breccias. Dating of the event suggest it occurred 1.34–1.84 million years ago. The suspected impact crater lies between two mountain ranges to the east and west: the Titiwangsa and Bintang mountains, respectively. The Perak River cuts through the supposed structure. Rocks in the area include alluvium and tephra from the Toba volcano, dating to the Quaternary, and granite from the Triassic, which is part of a pluton.

Platinum group elements (PGEs), a strong indicator of meteorite impact events, were largely absent in the rock samples studied for an article published in the journal Current Science in 2015. The authors concluded that the presence of an impact structure was ambiguous. Several possible reasons may explain the lack of PGE: The projectile was of the achondrite type, hence contained low PGEs, and a shallow-angle impact of under 45° may cause vapourized remnants of the projectile (high or low in PGEs) to escape the crater, leaving no traces in the impact area. A similar example is the Chicxulub crater, which shows no detectable traces of the projectile, though the Cretaceous–Paleogene boundary formation worldwide indicated high PGEs concentration.

In a separate 2012 study published in Sains Malaysiana, gravity measurements to identify gravity anomalies in the area proposed the presence of a crater with a diameter of 2.5 km (1.6 mi) and extending to 300 m (980 ft) depth. A Bouguer anomaly map of the area also identified two possible impact craters north and south of Bukit Bunuh. Other estimates suggest a diameter of 5–6 km (3.1–3.7 mi).
