= Mohamad Amin Roslan =

Malaysian politician

Yang Berhormat Tuan Mohamad Amin Roslan MLA
- محمد امين روسلن

Member of the Perak State Legislative Assembly for Pengkalan Hulu
- Incumbent
- Assumed office 19 December 2022
- Preceded by: Aznel Ibrahim (BN–UMNO)
- Majority: 1,324 (2022)

Personal details
- Born: 13 April 1991 (age 35) Kroh, Perak, Malaysia
- Party: Malaysian Islamic Party (PAS)
- Other political affiliations: Perikatan Nasional (PN) (2020–present)
- Occupation: Politician

Mohamad Amin bin Roslan (born 13 April 1991) is a Malaysian politician who served as Member of the Perak State Legislative Assembly (MLA) for Pengkalan Hulu since November 2022. He is a member of Malaysian Islamic Party (PAS), a component party of Perikatan Nasional (PN).

== Election results ==
Perak State Legislative Assembly
Year	Constituency	Candidate	Votes	Pct	Opponent(s)	Votes	Pct	Ballots cast	Majority	Turnout
2022	N01 Pengkalan Hulu	Mohamad Amin Roslan (PAS)	7,114	47.60%	Aznel Ibrahim (UMNO)	5,790	38.74%	14,952	1,324	75.67%
2022	N01 Pengkalan Hulu	Mohamad Amin Roslan (PAS)	7,114	47.60%	Mohd Saad Ismail (AMANAH)	2,041	13.66%	14,952	1,324	75.67%
