= Ulu Titi Basah =

- Location within Thailand

Highest point
- Elevation: 1,533 m (5,030 ft)
- Prominence: 1,059 m (3,474 ft)
- Listing: Ribu; List of mountains in Thailand
- Coordinates: 5°48′N 101°19′E

Geography
- Location: Betong District, Yala Province, Thailand; Hulu Perak District, Perak State, Malaysia
- Parent range: Sankalakhiri Range

Geology
- Mountain type: granite

Climbing
- First ascent: unknown

Ulu Titi Basah (Thai: เขาฮูลูติติปาซา; Malay: Gunung Ulu Titi Basah) is the southernmost high peak of Thailand. The peak is 1,533 metres (5,030 ft) tall and is located on the Malaysia–Thailand border between Betong District of Yala province and Hulu Perak in the state of Perak.

== Geography ==
Ulu Titi Basah is the highest summit of the Sankalakhiri Range (Thai: ทิวเขาสันกาลาคีรี), the northern section of the Titiwangsa Mountains, a sub-range of the Tenasserim Hills.

== See also ==
- List of mountains in Thailand
- Temenggor Lake
