= Temenggor Lake =

Temenggor Lake Tasik Temenggor
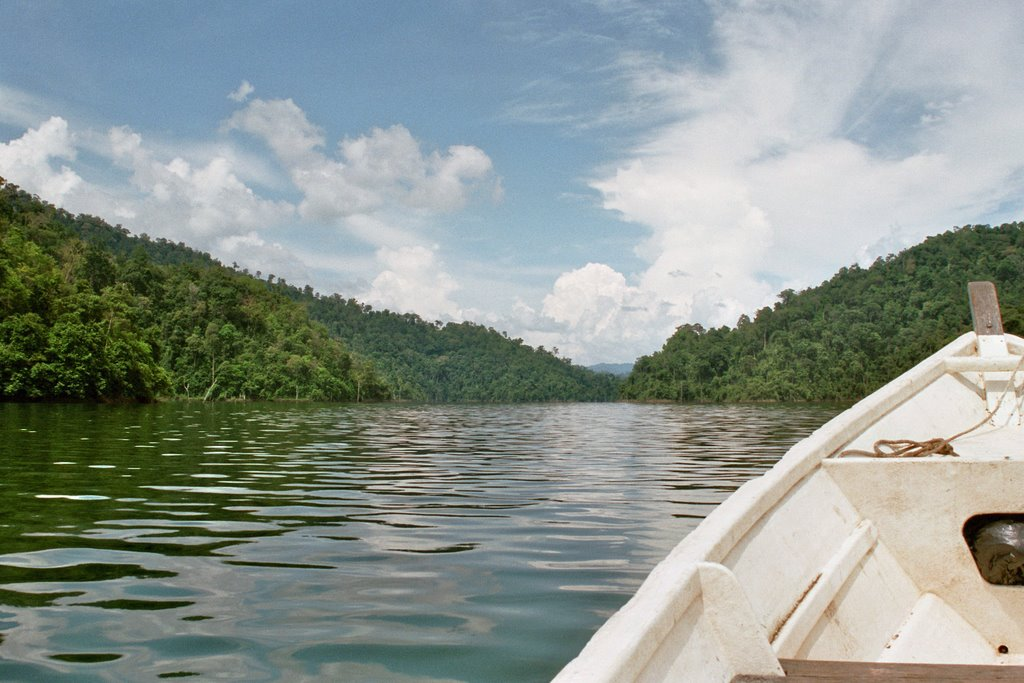

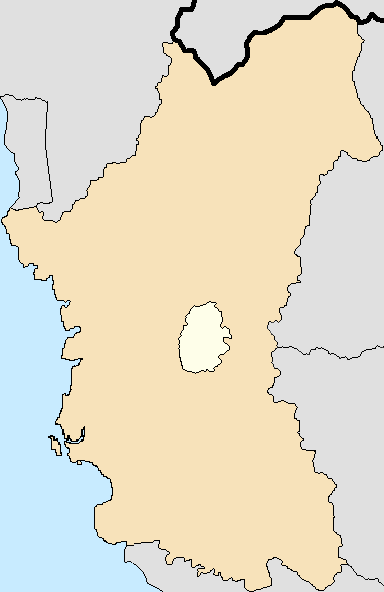
- Location within Ipoh
- Location: Hulu Perak District, Perak, Peninsular Malaysia
- Coordinates: 5.31°N 101.20°E
- Type: Reservoir
- Primary inflows: Perak River
- Primary outflows: Perak River
- Basin countries: Malaysia
- Islands: Banding Island and several hundred other unnamed or unknown islands in the lake

Temenggor Lake (Malay: Tasik Temenggor) is a lake in Hulu Perak District, Perak, Malaysia. It is the second largest lake in Peninsular Malaysia after Kenyir Lake in Hulu Terengganu District, Terengganu. This man-made lake is located south of the 1,533 m high Ulu Titi Basah peak. The lake was created by the construction of Temenggor Dam to generate electric power. The lake is located about 45 km from the Hulu Perak district capital, Gerik. There is a bridge on the East-West Highway, which crosses the lake and passing through a man-made island called Banding Island (Pulau Banding).

== Recreational activity ==
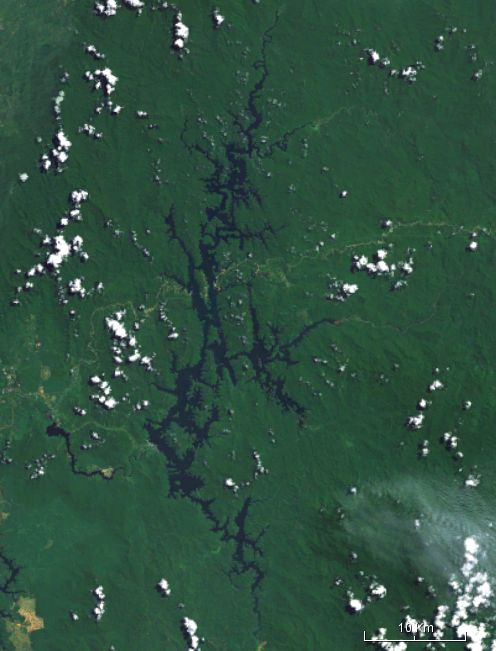
The lake seen through NASA satellite image.

The Perak Fisheries Department is tasked with implementing the Temenggor Lake Management Plan. Lake Temenggor is divided into Conservation Zones, Recreational Fishing Zones and Commercial Zones. The Conservation Zone covers the northern part of Temenggor Lake as the Sungai Kejar, Sungai Tiang and Sungai Gadong.

== Freshwater fishing culture ==
Lake Temenggor was developed as a freshwater fish breeding site. The river fish are exposed to extinction due to toxic waste disposal, smuggling and use of chemicals and fish bombs, electric and tubular shock.

Since 1997, the Perak Fisheries Department has issued freshwater fish stems and seeds through the Central Fisheries Center (PPD) at Banding. PPD Banding is fully operational since 1 November 2006 and serves as an extension center providing technical advice, information and reference center.

High value fish such as Kelah, Temoleh, Baung, Clubau, Tengas, Loma, Tengalan, Sebarau and Lampam river can be found here. Many prawns are found in Perak River, Kinta River and Kampung Dew River in Kamunting, Taiping.

The Malaysia-Norway joint venture company, Trapia Malaysia Sdn Bhd, operates tilapia fish farming in Lake Banding on a commercial basis. Lake Temengor is targeted with producing 40,000 tonnes of fish per year from fish cage activities by 2013.

== Accidents ==
On 15 December 2007, 3 soldiers were killed when logs fell on their tents. The three victims were from 21 Royal Malay Regiment (RAMD) Pengkalan Chepa, Kelantan who patrolled the Belum Forest.

Those killed were Corporal Fauzi Yamat, 35, from Kelantan; Personnel Mohd Yazman Yaakub, 35, from Pasir Putih, Kelantan and Private Roslin Hassan, 22, from Setiu, Terengganu. Injured troops were Lt Shah Amirul Izham Shamsul Kamar; Lans Kpl Mohd Yusri Yusuf, Prebet Mohd Izham Ishak and Prebet Amar Mohamad Nordin. The victims were evacuated by a Royal Malaysian Air Force (RMAF) helicopter.

== Notable features ==
- Belum-Temengor
- Temenggor Lake Bridge
- Malaysian Public Works Department (JKR) East-West Highway Monument
- Orang Asli village

== See also ==
- East-West Highway
- Temenggor Dam
- List of lakes in Malaysia
