= Kebebe =

Malaysian fruit salad

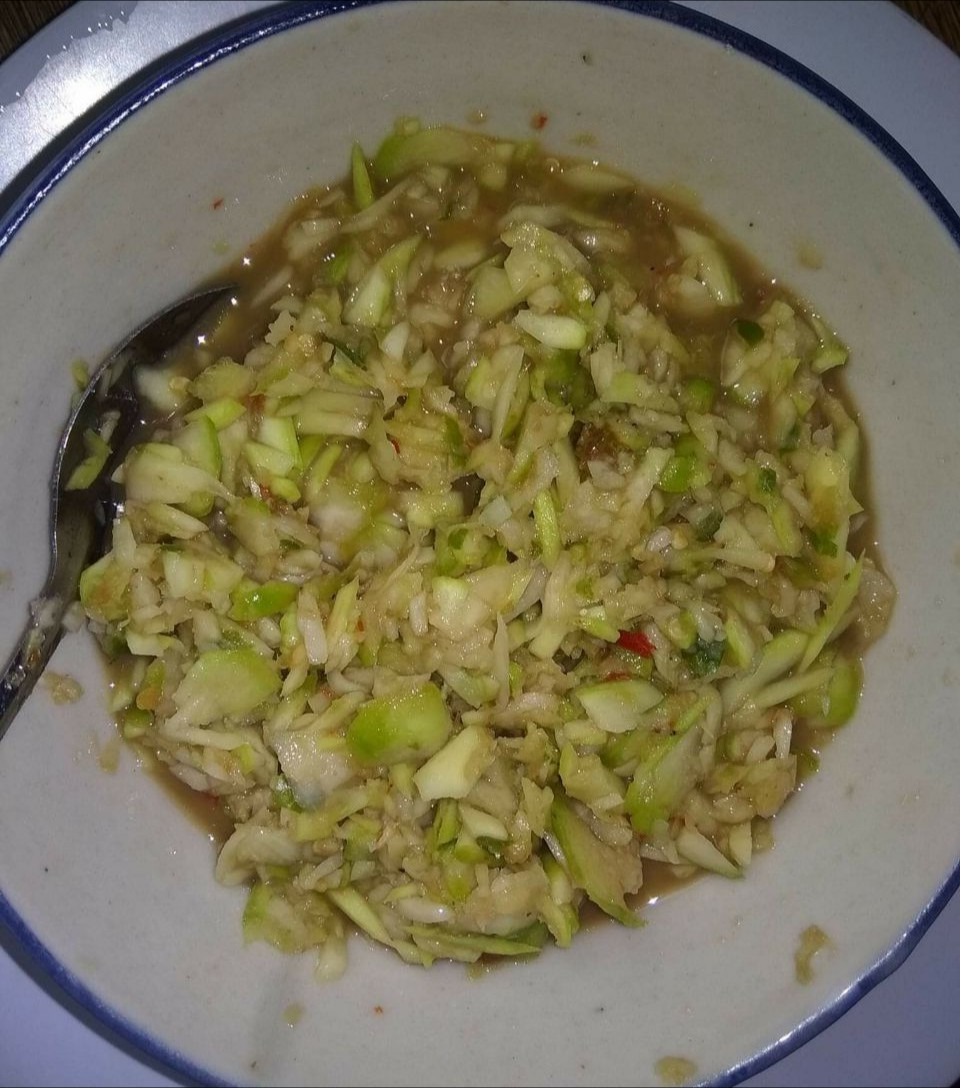
- Type: Salad
- Course: Dessert
- Place of origin: Malaysia
- Region or state: Lenggong, Perak
- Main ingredients: Banana flower, bird's eye chilli, shrimp paste, salt, sugar, leatherback bamboo, cermai, kelempong, cedong, jackfruit, guava, pineapple and coconut

Kebebe is a traditional salad dish from Lenggong, Perak, Malaysia. It is usually served during traditional wedding feasts as a dessert or afternoon tea with hot beverages.

A fruit salad, kebebe mainly consists of banana flower, bird's eye chili, leatherback bamboo, cermai, kelempong, cedong, jackfruit, guava, pineapple and coconut, and dressed with belacan, sugar and salt. It is purportedly able to cure nausea after consuming too much food.

== See also ==
- Cuisine of Malaysia
- Rojak
