= Aznel Ibrahim =

Malaysian politician

Yang Berbahagia Dato' Aznel Ibrahim DPMP AMP PJK AMN
- أزنيل إبراهيم

Member of the Perak State Legislative Assembly for Pengkalan Hulu
- In office 5 May 2013 – 19 November 2022
- Preceded by: Tajol Rosli Mohd Ghazali (BN–UMNO)
- Succeeded by: Mohamad Amin Roslan (PN–PAS)
- Majority: 3,361 (2013); 2,375 (2018)

Political Secretary of the Menteri Besar of Perak
- In office 12 October 2020 – 3 December 2020
- Menteri Besar: Ahmad Faizal Azumu
- Preceded by: Iskandar Dzulkarnain Abdul Khalid
- Succeeded by: Position abolished

Personal details
- Born: Aznel bin Ibrahim
- Citizenship: Malaysian
- Party: UMNO
- Other political affiliations: Barisan Nasional
- Occupation: Politician

Aznel bin Ibrahim is a Malaysian politician who had served as the Member of Perak State Legislative Assembly for Pengkalan Hulu from 2013 to November 2022. He is a member and the Division Chief of Gerik of the United Malays National Organisation (UMNO), a component party of the Barisan Nasional (BN) coalition.

== Education ==
He had studied in SK Kroh, SM Tun Saban and Alor Setar Technical High School. He is also an Executive MBA.

== Politics ==
He was the Political Secretary of Menteri Besar of Perak, Ahmad Faizal Azumu. He was a committee member, Vice Chief and Deputy Chief of UMNO Gerik Division before becoming the Division Chief replacing the late Hasbullah Osman.

== Election results ==
Perak State Legislative Assembly
Year	Constituency	Candidate	Votes	Pct	Opponent(s)	Votes	Pct	Ballots cast	Majority	Turnout
2013	N01 Pengkalan Hulu	Aznel Ibrahim (UMNO)	7,206	62.06%	Abdullah Masnan (PKR)	3,845	33.12%	11,611	3,361	83.40%
2018	N01 Pengkalan Hulu	Aznel Ibrahim (UMNO)	5,716	47.15%	Hamidi Ismail (PAS)	3,341	27.56%	12,124	2,375	78.89%
2018	N01 Pengkalan Hulu	Aznel Ibrahim (UMNO)	5,716	47.15%	Ahmad Safwan (BERSATU)	2,711	22.36%	12,124	2,375	78.89%
2022	N01 Pengkalan Hulu	Aznel Ibrahim (UMNO)	5,790	38.74%	Mohamad Amin Roslan (PAS)	7,114	47.60%	14,952	1,324	75.67%
2022	N01 Pengkalan Hulu	Aznel Ibrahim (UMNO)	5,790	38.74%	Mohd Saad Ismail (AMANAH)	2,041	13.66%	14,952	1,324	75.67%

== Honours ==
- Malaysia
  - Member of the Order of the Defender of the Realm (AMN) (2010)
- Perak
  - Knight Commander of the Order of the Perak State Crown (DPMP) – Dato' (2017)
  - Member of the Order of the Perak State Crown (AMP) (2002)
  - Recipient of the Meritorious Service Medal (PJK) (1999)
