= Pengkalan Hulu (state constituency) =

Political subdivision in Malaysia

Pengkalan Hulu (N01)
Perak constituency

State constituency
- Legislature: Perak State Legislative Assembly
MLA
Mohamad Amin Roslan
PN
- Constituency created: 1994
- First contested: 1995
- Last contested: 2022

Demographics
- Electors (2022): 20,157

Pengkalan Hulu is a state constituency in Perak, Malaysia, that has been represented in the Perak State Legislative Assembly.

== Demographics ==
Ethnic breakdown of Pengkalan Hulu's electorate as of 2022
1. Malay (71.8%)
2. Other ethnicities (14.8%)
3. Chinese (8.53%)
4. Indian (4.89%)

== History ==
=== Polling districts ===
According to the federal gazette issued on 31 October 2022, the Pengkalan Hulu constituency is divided into 10 polling districts.

State constituency	Polling districts	Code	Location
Pengkalan Hulu (N01)	Kuak Hulu	054/01/01	SK Kuak Hulu
Pengkalan Hulu (N01)	Ayer Panas	054/01/02	SK Ayer Panas; SK (FELDA) Lepang Nenering
Pengkalan Hulu (N01)	Kuak Luar	054/01/03	SK Kuak Luar
Pengkalan Hulu (N01)	Pekan Kroh	054/01/04	SK Keroh
Pengkalan Hulu (N01)	Kampong Selarong	054/01/05	SK Bekuai
Pengkalan Hulu (N01)	Tasek	054/01/06	SK Tasek
Pengkalan Hulu (N01)	Klian Intan	054/01/07	SK Klian Intan
Pengkalan Hulu (N01)	Kampong Pahit	054/02/08	SK Pahit
Pengkalan Hulu (N01)	Kampong Lalang	054/01/09	SK Kampong Lalang
Pengkalan Hulu (N01)	Kampong Plang	054/01/10	SK Plang

=== Representation history ===
Perak State Legislative Assemblyman for Pengkalan Hulu
Assembly	No	Years	Member	Party
Constituency created from Kenering and Temengor
9th	N01	1995 – 1999	Ibrahim Mohd Hanafiah	BN (UMNO)
10th	N01	1999 – 2004	Ibrahim Mohd Hanafiah	BN (UMNO)
11th	N01	2004 – 2008	Tajol Rosli Mohd Ghazali	BN (UMNO)
12th	N01	2008 – 2013	Tajol Rosli Mohd Ghazali	BN (UMNO)
13th	N01	2013 – 2018	Aznel Ibrahim	BN (UMNO)
14th	N01	2018 – 2022	Aznel Ibrahim	BN (UMNO)
15th	N01	2022–present	Mohamad Amin Roslan	PN (PAS)

== Election results ==
Perak state election, 2022
Party	Candidate	Votes	%	∆%
PN	Mohamad Amin Roslan	7,114	47.60	▲47.60
BN	Aznel Ibrahim	5,790	38.74	▼8.41
PH	Mohd Saad Ismail	2,041	13.66	▲13.66
Total valid votes		15,252	100.00	
Total rejected ballots		271		
Unreturned ballots		36		
Turnout		14,952	75.67	▼3.22
Registered electors		20,157		
Majority		1,324	8.86	▼10.73
PN gain from BN		Swing		?

Perak state election, 2018
Party	Candidate	Votes	%	∆%
BN	Aznel Ibrahim	5,716	47.15	▼14.91
PAS	Hamidi Ismail	3,341	27.56	▲27.56
PKR	Ahmad Safwan	2,711	22.36	▼10.76
Total valid votes		11,768	97.06	
Total rejected ballots		307	2.53	
Unreturned ballots		49	0.40	
Turnout		12,124	78.89	▼4.51
Registered electors		15,369		
Majority		2,375	19.59	▼9.35
BN hold		Swing		
Source(s) "RESULTS OF CONTESTED ELECTION AND STATEMENTS OF THE POLL AFTER THE OFFICIAL ADDITION OF VOTES".

Perak state election, 2013
Party	Candidate	Votes	%	∆%
BN	Aznel Ibrahim	7,206	62.06	▼11.09
PKR	Abdullah Masnan	3,845	33.12	▲10.17
Total valid votes		11,051	95.18	
Total rejected ballots		279	2.40	
Unreturned ballots		281	2.42	
Turnout		11,611	83.40	▲4.86
Registered electors		13,924		
Majority		3,361	28.94	▼21.26
BN hold		Swing		
Source(s) "KEPUTUSAN PILIHAN RAYA UMUM DEWAN UNDANGAN NEGERI". Archived from the original on 2020-02-19.

Perak state election, 2008
Party	Candidate	Votes	%	∆%
BN	Tajol Rosli Mohd Ghazali	6,769	73.15	▲0.93
PKR	Lee Sing Long	2,124	22.95	▲22.95
Total valid votes		8,893	96.10	
Total rejected ballots		361	3.90	
Unreturned ballots		0	0.00	
Turnout		9,254	78.54	▲0.91
Registered electors		11,783		
Majority		4,645	50.20	▼0.49
BN hold		Swing		
Source(s) "KEPUTUSAN PILIHAN RAYA UMUM DEWAN UNDANGAN NEGERI PERAK BAGI TAHUN 2008".

Perak state election, 2004
Party	Candidate	Votes	%	∆%
BN	Tajol Rosli Mohd Ghazali	6,402	72.22	▲12.88
PAS	Junid Mat Ghodzali	1,909	21.53	▼9.68
Total valid votes		8,311	93.76	
Total rejected ballots		354	3.99	
Unreturned ballots		199	2.25	
Turnout		8,864	77.63	▲1.63
Registered electors		11,418		
Majority		4,493	50.69	▼22.56
BN hold		Swing		
Source(s) "KEPUTUSAN PILIHAN RAYA UMUM DEWAN UNDANGAN NEGERI PERAK BAGI TAHUN 2004".

Perak state election, 1999
Party	Candidate	Votes	%	∆%
BN	Ibrahim Mohd Hanafiah	6,447	59.34	▼6.18
PAS	Mohd Arif Aripin	3,391	31.21	▲5.23
Total valid votes		9,838	90.55	
Total rejected ballots		265	2.44	
Unreturned ballots		762	7.01	
Turnout		10,865	76.00	▲3.18
Registered electors		14,296		
Majority		3,056	28.13	▼11.41
BN hold		Swing		
Source(s) "KEPUTUSAN PILIHAN RAYA UMUM DEWAN UNDANGAN NEGERI PERAK BAGI TAHUN 1999".

Perak state election, 1995
Party	Candidate	Votes	%
BN	Ibrahim Mohd Hanafiah	6,345	65.52
PAS	Mohd Dali Ghazali	2,516	25.98
Total valid votes		8,861	91.50
Total rejected ballots		347	3.58
Unreturned ballots		476	4.92
Turnout		9,684	72.82
Registered electors		13,298	
Majority		3,829	39.54
This was a new constituency created.
Source(s) "KEPUTUSAN PILIHAN RAYA UMUM DEWAN UNDANGAN NEGERI PERAK BAGI TAHUN 1995".
