= Kerian River =

River in Kedah and Perak, Malaysia

Coordinates: 5°10′N 100°25′E

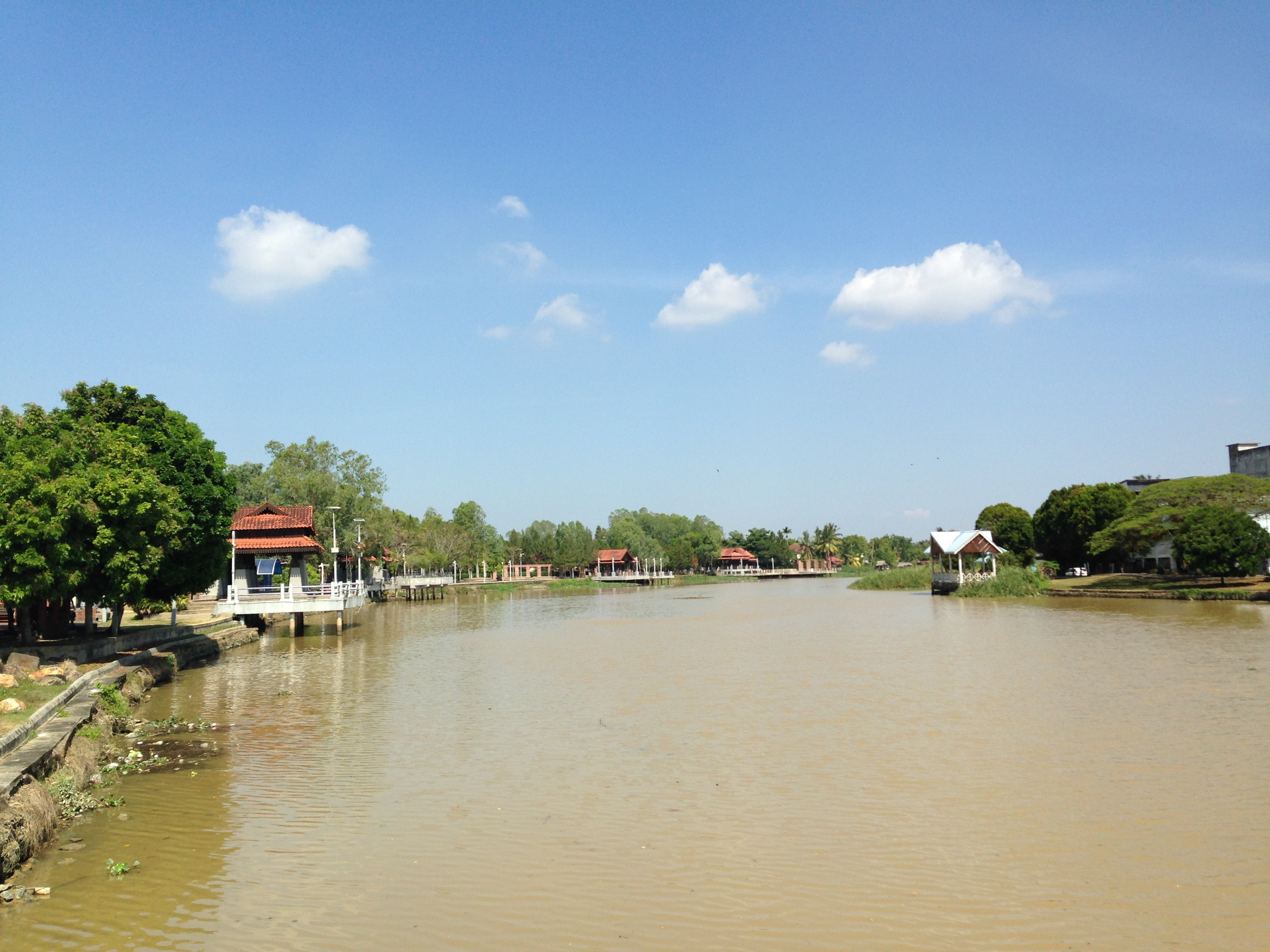
- Native name: Sungai Kerian (Malay)

Location
- Country: Perak, Malaysia

Physical characteristics
- Source
  - location: Bintang Range
- Mouth
  - location: Kampung Sungai Udang, Nibong Tebal, Penang
- Length: 90 km (56 mi)
- Basin size: 1,420 km^{2} (550 sq mi)

The Kerian River (Malay: Sungai Kerian), alternately Krian, is a river in the northern part of the Malaysian state of Perak. The river originates from the Bintang Range. It flows westerly and discharges into the Strait of Malacca. The main tributaries are the Selama River, Ijok River, Samagagah River and Ulu Mengkuang River.

== Settlements ==
The Kerian River flows through the towns of Parit Buntar, Perak, Nibong Tebal, Penang and Bandar Baharu, Kedah.

== Incidents ==
- March 2015 – Thousand of catfish and mayong fish were found dead at Kampung Jajar, Jalan Trans Kerian. The reason for the mass death of the fish is yet to be investigated.
- In September 1972, a ferry was sunk in the near Perak and Kedah border, 27 people was drowned, the causes is the heavy rain and strong currents, the steel cables holding to barge to snap, leading to the vessel tilting and sinking. A hero, the ferry operator, S. Annamalai died saving a passenger. (by Gemini)

== See also ==
- List of rivers of Malaysia
