= Lenggong bent-toed gecko =

Scientific classification
- Kingdom: Animalia
- Phylum: Chordata
- Class: Reptilia
- Order: Squamata
- Suborder: Gekkota
- Family: Gekkonidae
- Genus: Cyrtodactylus
- Species: C. lenggongensis

Binomial name
- Cyrtodactylus lenggongensis Grismer, Wood, Anuar, Grismer, Quah, Murdoch, Muin, Davis, Auilar, Klabacka, Cobos, Aowphol, & Sites, 2016

Species of lizard

The Lenggong bent-toed gecko (Cyrtodactylus lenggongensis) is a species of gecko that is endemic to peninsular Malaysia.
