= Tajol Rosli Mohd Ghazali =

Malaysian politician

Yang Berbahagia Tan Sri Dato' Seri DiRaja Tajol Rosli Mohd Ghazali PSM SPSA DGSM SPMP DPMP AMP
- تاج الرسلي محمد غزالي

9th Menteri Besar of Perak
- In office 3 December 1999 – 16 March 2008
- Monarch: Azlan Shah
- Preceded by: Ramli Ngah Talib
- Succeeded by: Mohammad Nizar Jamaluddin
- Constituency: Kenering (1999–2004); Pengkalan Hulu (2004–2008)

Ministerial roles
- 1983–1985: Parliamentary Secretary of National and Rural Development
- 1985–1990: Deputy Minister of National and Rural Development
- 1990–1995: Deputy Minister of Energy, Telecommunications and Posts
- 1995–1999: Deputy Minister of Housing and Local Government
- 1999: Minister in the Prime Minister's Department

Faction represented in Dewan Rakyat
- 1978–1999: Barisan Nasional

Faction represented in Perak State Legislative Assembly
- 1999–2013: Barisan Nasional

Personal details
- Born: Mohamad Tajol Rosli bin Mohamed Ghazali; 6 November 1946 (age 79) Lenggong, Perak, British Malaya (now Malaysia)
- Citizenship: Malaysian
- Party: United Malays National Organisation (UMNO)
- Other political affiliations: Barisan Nasional (BN); Perikatan Nasional (PN); Muafakat Nasional (MN)
- Spouse: Kamariah Mokri
- Parent: Mohamed Ghazali bin Jawi (father)
- Education: University of Melbourne

Mohamad Tajol Rosli bin Mohamed Ghazali (Jawi: محمد تاج الرسلي بن محمد غزالي; born 6 November 1946) is a Malaysian politician who served as the 9th Menteri Besar of Perak from 1999 to 2008. He was also the Member of Parliament of Gerik from 1978 to 1999, the Member of Perak State Legislative Assembly for Kenering from 1977 to 1978, 1999 to 2004 and for Pengkalan Hulu from 2004 to 2013.

== Education ==
In 1964, he furthered his studies at the University of Melbourne, Australia and graduated with a Bachelor of Commerce.

== Politics ==
Tajol gave up his positions as Perak Barisan Nasional chief and member of the state Umno liaison committee to then Deputy Prime Minister Datuk Seri Najib Tun Razak on 30 January 2009. Then minister in the Prime Minister's department, Datuk Seri Ahmad Zahid Hamidi became Najib's deputy in Perak.

== Election results ==
Parliament of Malaysia
Year	Constituency	Candidate	Votes	Pct	Opponent(s)	Votes	Pct	Ballots cast	Majority	Turnout
1978	P044 Gerik	Tajol Rosli Mohd Ghazali (UMNO)	9,441	58.94%	Mohamad Junid (PAS)	3,599	22.47%	Unknown	5,842	Unknown
1978	P044 Gerik	Tajol Rosli Mohd Ghazali (UMNO)	9,441	58.94%	Fong Cheng Wee (DAP)	2,977	18.59%	Unknown	5,842	Unknown
1982	P044 Gerik	Tajol Rosli Mohd Ghazali (UMNO)	13,355	71.97%	Hassan bin Hussein (PAS)	5,202	28.03%	19,298	8,153	75.65%
1986	P049 Gerik	Tajol Rosli Mohd Ghazali (UMNO)	12,039	62.41%	Mohd Rus Jaafar (PAS)	4,054	21.02%	19,920	7,985	69.43%
1986	P049 Gerik	Tajol Rosli Mohd Ghazali (UMNO)	12,039	62.41%	Choo Sing Chye (DAP)	3,197	16.57%	19,920	7,985	69.43%
1990	P049 Gerik	Tajol Rosli Mohd Ghazali (UMNO)	15,578	64.52%	Roslan Mohd Latif (S46)	8,565	35.48%	24,957	7,013	72.33%
1995	P052 Gerik	Tajol Rosli Mohd Ghazali (UMNO)	17,170	71.90%	Roslan Mohd Latif (S46)	6,712	28.10%	25,655	10,458	69.94%

Perak State Legislative Assembly
Year	Constituency	Candidate	Votes	Pct.	Opponent(s)	Votes	Pct.	Ballots cast	Majority	Turnout
1977	N02 Kenering	Tajol Rosli Mohd Ghazali (UMNO)		%			%			%
1999	N03 Kenering	Tajol Rosli Mohd Ghazali (UMNO)	4,612	58.51%	Azman Pandak (PAS)	3,086	39.15%	7,882	1,526	66.18%
2004	N01 Pengkalan Hulu	Tajol Rosli Mohd Ghazali (UMNO)	6,402	72.22%	Junid Mat Ghodzali (PAS)	1,909	21.53%	8,864	4,493	77.63%
2008	N01 Pengkalan Hulu	Tajol Rosli Mohd Ghazali (UMNO)	6,769	73.15%	Lee Sing Long (PKR)	2,124	22.95%	9,254	4,645	78.54%

== Honours ==
=== Honours of Malaysia ===
Tajol received the Panglima Setia Mahkota (P.S.M.) award which carries the title 'Tan Sri' from Yang di-Pertuan Agong, Tuanku Mizan Zainal Abidin, the Sultan of Terengganu in conjunction with His Majesty's 48th official birthday on 5 June 2010.

- Malaysia
  - Commander of the Order of Loyalty to the Crown of Malaysia (PSM) – Tan Sri (2010)
- Perak
  - Member of the Order of the Perak State Crown (AMP) (1979)
  - Knight Commander of the Order of the Perak State Crown (DPMP) – Dato' (1986)
  - Knight Grand Commander of the Order of the Perak State Crown (SPMP) – Dato' Seri (1999)
  - Ordinary Class of the Perak Family Order of Sultan Azlan Shah (SPSA) – Dato' Seri DiRaja (2000)
- Malacca
  - Grand Commander of the Exalted Order of Malacca (DGSM) – Datuk Seri (2003)

Political offices
Preceded by Ramli Ngah Talib	Chief Minister of Perak; 1999 – 2008	Succeeded by Mohammad Nizar Jamaluddin
