= Kenering =

Political subdivision in Malaysia

Kenering (N03)
Perak constituency

State constituency
- Legislature: Perak State Legislative Assembly
MLA
Husaini Ariffin
PN
- Constituency created: 1974
- First contested: 1974
- Last contested: 2022

Demographics
- Electors (2022): 21,596

Kenering is a state constituency in Perak, Malaysia, that has been represented in the Perak State Legislative Assembly.

== Demographics ==
Ethnic breakdown of Kenering's electorate as of 2022
1. Malay (83.5%)
2. Chinese (9.78%)
3. Other ethnicities (6.04%)
4. Indian (0.64%)

== History ==
=== Polling districts ===
According to the federal gazette issued on 31 October 2022, the Kenering constituency is divided into 18 polling districts.

State constituency	Polling Districts	Code	Location
Kenering (N03）	Kenering Utara	055/03/01	SK Kenayat
Kenering (N03）	Tawai	055/03/02	SK Seri Tawai
Kenering (N03）	Ulu Kenderong	055/03/03	Maahad Tahfiz dan Kemukjizatan Al-Quran
Kenering (N03）	Padang Kunyit	055/03/04	SA Rakyat Al Wahiyah
Kenering (N03）	Kampong Ayer Panas	055/03/05	SK Tan Sri Ghzali Jawi
Kenering (N03）	Kampong Padang	055/03/06	SMK Gerik
Kenering (N03）	Kampong Ganda	055/03/07	SK Ganda Temengor
Kenering (N03）	Sungai Dala	055/03/08	SK RPS Dala
Kenering (N03）	Belum Baharu	055/03/09	SK Kenering
Kenering (N03）	FELDA Papulut	055/03/10	SK (FELDA) Papalut
Kenering (N03）	Lawin	055/03/11	SMK Kenering
Kenering (N03）	FELDA Lawin Selatan	055/03/12	SK (FELDA) Lawin Selatan
Kenering (N03）	Kampong Sawa	055/03/13	SA Rakyat Nur Kamaliah
Kenering (N03）	Ayer Kala	055/03/14	Dewan Orang Ramai Ayer Kala
Kenering (N03）	Selat Pagar	055/03/15	SJK (C) Selat Pagar
Kenering (N03）	Sumpitan	055/03/16	SK Sumpitan
Kenering (N03）	Padang Gerus	055/03/17	SJK (C) Padang Grus
Kenering (N03）	Bukit Sapi	055/03/18	SK Bukit Sapi

=== Representation history ===
Perak State Legislative Assemblyman for Kenering
Assembly	No	Years	Member	Party
Constituency created from Lenggong and Grik
4th	N02	1974 – 1977	Tajol Rosli Mohd Ghazali	BN (UMNO)
4th	N02	1977 – 1978	Mohamed Ghazali Jawi	BN (UMNO)
5th	N02	1978 – 1982	Wan Mohamed Wan Teh	BN (UMNO)
6th	N02	1982 – 1983	Wan Mohamed Wan Teh	BN (UMNO)
6th	N02	1983 – 1986	Johan Lahamat	BN (UMNO)
7th	N02	1986 – 1990	Johan Lahamat	BN (UMNO)
8th	N02	1990 – 1995	Johan Lahamat	BN (UMNO)
9th	N03	1995 – 1999	Khamsiyah Yeop	BN (UMNO)
10th	N03	1999 – 2004	Tajol Rosli Mohd Ghazali	BN (UMNO)
11th	N03	2004 – 2008	Mohd Tarmizi Idris	BN (UMNO)
12th	N03	2008 – 2013	Mohd Tarmizi Idris	BN (UMNO)
13th	N03	2013 – 2018	Mohd Tarmizi Idris	BN (UMNO)
14th	N03	2018 – 2022	Mohd Tarmizi Idris	BN (UMNO)
15th	N03	2022–present	Husaini Ariffin	PN (PAS)

== Election results ==
Perak state election, 2022: Kenering
Party	Candidate	Votes	%	∆%
PN	Husairi Ariffin	7,664	46.99	▲46.99
BN	Rohaida Mohamad Yaakub	6,901	42.31	▼11.86
PH	Mohamad Jamean Zulkepli	1,745	10.70	▲10.70
Total valid votes		16,679	100.00	
Total rejected ballots		325		
Unreturned ballots		44		
Turnout		17,048	77.23	▼3.06
Registered electors		21,596		
Majority		763	4.68	▼19.31
PN gain from BN		Swing		?

Perak state election, 2018: Kenering
Party	Candidate	Votes	%	∆%
BN	Mohd Tarmizi Idris	7,379	54.17	▼6.26
PAS	Azhar Rasdi	4,111	30.18	▲30.18
PKR	Noor Sham Abu Samah	1,832	13.45	▼22.45
Total valid votes		13,322	97.80	
Total rejected ballots		241	1.77	
Unreturned ballots		59	0.43	
Turnout		13,622	80.29	▼5.61
Registered electors		16,965		
Majority		3,268	23.99	▼0.54
BN hold		Swing		
Source(s) "RESULTS OF CONTESTED ELECTION AND STATEMENTS OF THE POLL AFTER THE OFFICIAL ADDITION OF VOTES".

Perak state election, 2013: Kenering
Party	Candidate	Votes	%	∆%
BN	Mohd Tarmizi Idris	8,216	60.43	▼4.34
PKR	Mohamad Tarmizi Abdul Hamid	4,881	35.90	▲35.90
Total valid votes		13,097	96.32	
Total rejected ballots		284	2.09	
Unreturned ballots		216	1.59	
Turnout		13,597	85.90	▲9.17
Registered electors		15,830		
Majority		3,335	24.53	▼5.01
BN hold		Swing		
Source(s) "KEPUTUSAN PILIHAN RAYA UMUM DEWAN UNDANGAN NEGERI". Archived from the original on 2013-06-07.

Perak state election, 2008: Kenering
Party	Candidate	Votes	%	∆%
BN	Mohd Tarmizi Idris	6,134	64.77	▼1.47
PAS	Mohd Sukri Ahmad	3,336	35.23	▲1.47
Total valid votes		9,470	98.18	
Total rejected ballots		176	1.86	
Unreturned ballots		29	0.31	
Turnout		9,646	76.73	▲3.48
Registered electors		12,609		
Majority		2,798	29.54	▼2.94
BN hold		Swing		
Source(s) "KEPUTUSAN PILIHAN RAYA UMUM DEWAN UNDANGAN NEGERI PERAK BAGI TAHUN 2008".

Perak state election, 2004: Kenering
Party	Candidate	Votes	%	∆%
BN	Mohd Tarmizi Idris	5,823	66.24	▲6.33
PAS	Mohd Sukri Ahmad	2,968	33.76	▼6.33
Total valid votes		8,791	98.51	
Total rejected ballots		121	1.36	
Unreturned ballots		12	0.13	
Turnout		8,924	73.25	▲7.07
Registered electors		12,183		
Majority		2,855	32.48	▲12.66
BN hold		Swing		
Source(s) "KEPUTUSAN PILIHAN RAYA UMUM DEWAN UNDANGAN NEGERI PERAK BAGI TAHUN 2004".

Perak state election, 1999: Kenering
Party	Candidate	Votes	%	∆%
BN	Tajol Rosli Mohd Ghazali	4,612	59.91	▼7.17
PAS	Azman Pandak	3,086	40.09	▲40.09
Total valid votes		7,698	97.67	
Total rejected ballots		166	2.21	
Unreturned ballots		18	0.23	
Turnout		7,882	66.18	▼2.16
Registered electors		11,910		
Majority		1,526	19.82	▼16.61
BN hold		Swing		
Source(s) "KEPUTUSAN PILIHAN RAYA UMUM DEWAN UNDANGAN NEGERI PERAK BAGI TAHUN 1999".

Perak state election, 1995: Kenering
Party	Candidate	Votes	%	∆%
BN	Khamsiyah Yeop	5,051	67.08	▲10.03
S46	Abdul Rani Che Lah	2,308	30.65	▼9.27
Independent	Sulaiman Jabar	171	2.27	▲2.27
Total valid votes		7,530	97.29	
Total rejected ballots		206	2.66	
Unreturned ballots		4	0.05	
Turnout		7,740	68.34	▼5.09
Registered electors		11,326		
Majority		2,743	36.43	▲19.32
BN hold		Swing		
Source(s) "KEPUTUSAN PILIHAN RAYA UMUM DEWAN UNDANGAN NEGERI PERAK BAGI TAHUN 1995".

Perak state election, 1990: Kenering
Party	Candidate	Votes	%	∆%
BN	Johan Lahamat	6,923	57.03	▼0.04
S46	Yusoff Mokhtar	4,846	39.92	▲39.92
Total valid votes		11,769	96.95	
Total rejected ballots		370	3.05	
Unreturned ballots		0	0.00	
Turnout		12,139	73.43	▲3.34
Registered electors		16,531		
Majority		2,077	17.11	▼17.40
BN hold		Swing		
Source(s) "KEPUTUSAN PILIHAN RAYA UMUM DEWAN UNDANGAN NEGERI PERAK BAGI TAHUN 1990".

Perak state election, 1986: Kenering
Party	Candidate	Votes	%	∆%
BN	Johan Lahamat	5,884	57.07	▼12.04
DAP	Wong Ah Sai	2,325	22.55	▲23.17
PAS	Mohd Arif Yaacob	1,826	17.71	▼11.13
Total valid votes		10,035	100.00	
Total rejected ballots		276		
Unreturned ballots		0		
Turnout		10,311	70.09	▲5.12
Registered electors		14,711		
Majority		3,559	35.47	▼5.88
BN hold		Swing		
Source(s) "KEPUTUSAN PILIHAN RAYA UMUM DEWAN UNDANGAN NEGERI PERAK BAGI TAHUN 1986".

Perak state by-election, 9 April 1983: Kenering Upon the resignation of the incumbent, Wan Mohamed Wan Teh
Party	Candidate	Votes	%	∆%
BN	Johan Lahamat	6,116	70.67	▲0.14
PAS	Md Arif Yaacob	2,538	29.33	▲29.33
Total valid votes		8,654	100.00	
Total rejected ballots		174		
Unreturned ballots		0		
Turnout		8,828	64.97	▼10.62
Registered electors		13,587		
Majority		3,578	41.35	▲0.28
BN hold		Swing		

Perak state election, 1982: Kenering
Party	Candidate	Votes	%	∆%
BN	Wan Mohamed Wan Teh	6,760	70.53	▲16.60
DAP	Chan Ah Ka	2,824	29.47	▲6.50
Total valid votes		9,584	100.00	
Total rejected ballots		562		
Unreturned ballots		0		
Turnout		10,146	75.60	▼4.09
Registered electors		13,421		
Majority		3,936	41.07	▲10.23
BN hold		Swing		

Perak state election, 1978: Kenering
Party	Candidate	Votes	%	∆%
BN	Wan Mohamed Wan Teh	4,692	53.94	▼11.83
PAS	Zainol Othman	2,009	23.09	▲23.09
DAP	Mohd. Yusof Othman	1,998	22.97	▼2.17
Total valid votes		8,699	100.00	
Total rejected ballots		263		
Unreturned ballots		0		
Turnout		8,962	79.69	▲4.77
Registered electors		11,246		
Majority		2,683	30.84	▼9.79
BN hold		Swing		

Perak state by-election, 19 November 1977: Kenering Upon the resignation of the incumbent, Mohamed Ghazali Jawi
Party	Candidate	Votes	%	∆%
BN	Mohd Tajol Rosli Mohd Ghazali	5,172	65.77	▼18.93
DAP	Ibrahim Singgeh	1,977	25.14	▲9.83
PEKEMAS	A. Yusop A. Mat Husin	715	9.09	▲9.09
Total valid votes		7,864	100.00	
Total rejected ballots		127		
Unreturned ballots		0		
Turnout		7,991	74.92	▼5.22
Registered electors		10,666		
Majority		3,195	40.63	▼28.76
BN hold		Swing		

Perak state election, 1974: Kenering
Party	Candidate	Votes	%	∆%
BN	Mohamed Ghazali Jawi	6,369	84.69	▲12.28
DAP	Zaharah binti Ibrahim	1,151	15.31	▲15.31
Total valid votes		7,520	100.00	
Total rejected ballots		165		
Unreturned ballots		0		
Turnout		7,685	80.14	▲1.95
Registered electors		9,590		
Majority		5,218	69.39	▲24.57
This was a new constituency created.
