= Belum-Temengor =

Largest continuous forest complex in Peninsular Malaysia

Royal Belum State Park
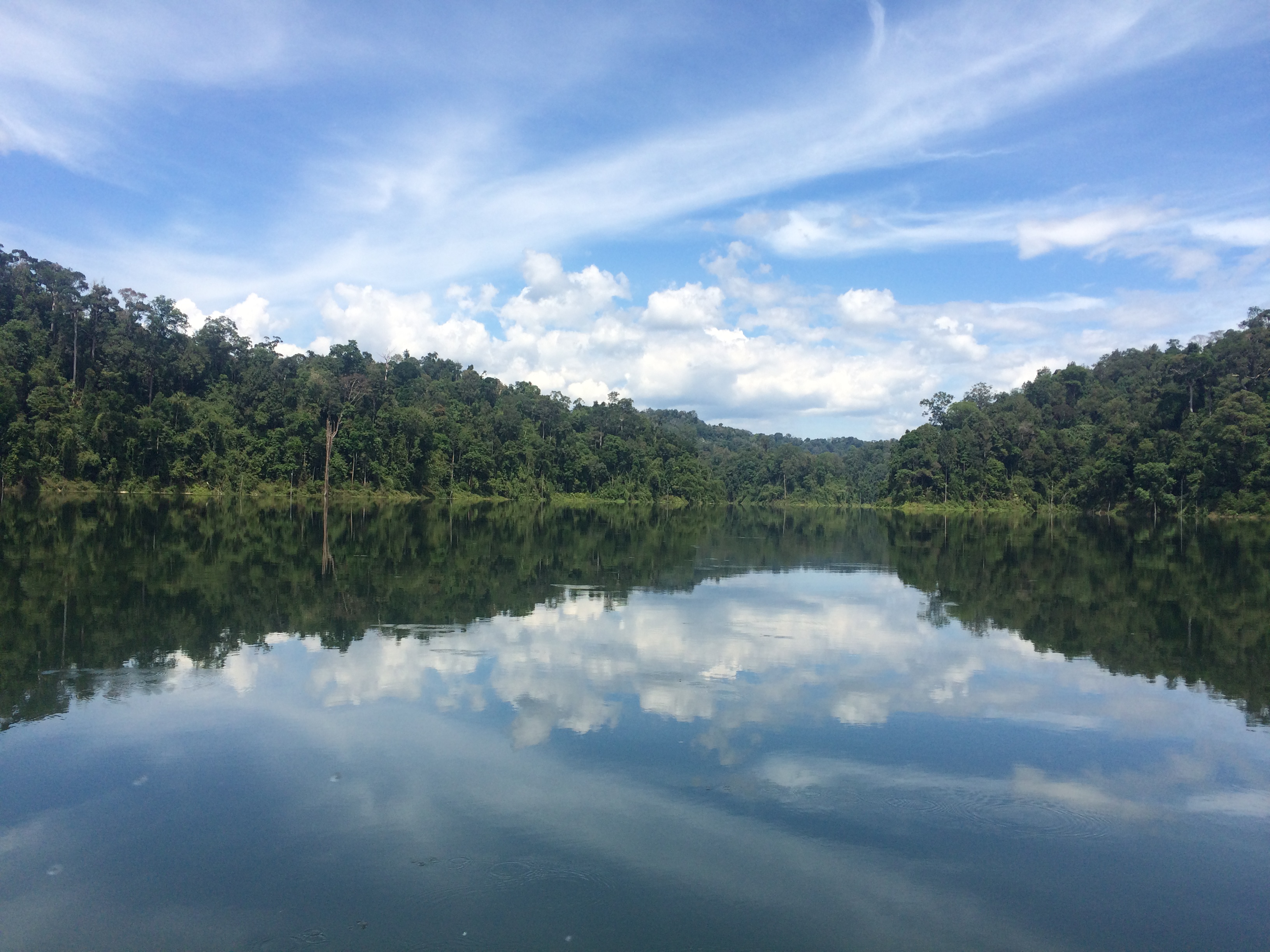
- Interactive map of Royal Belum State Park
- Nearest city: Gerik
- Coordinates: 5°32′58.91″N 101°20′52.4″E
- Area: 117,500 ha (454 sq mi)
- Authorized: 3 May 2007
- Operator: Perak State Parks Corporation

Belum-Temengor is the largest continuous forest complex in Peninsular Malaysia. Specifically, it is located in the Malaysian state of Perak (Hulu Perak) and crosses into Southern Thailand. Belum-Temenggor is divided into two sections. Belum is located up north, right by the Malaysia-Thailand border, while Temenggor is south of Belum. The Royal Belum State Park is entirely contained within the forest complex. Bang Lang National Park is on the Thailand side of the border.

== Description ==
Belum-Temenggor is believed to have been in existence for over 130 million years, making it one of the world's oldest rainforests, older than both the Amazon and the Congo. In the heart of the forest lies the manmade lake of Tasik Temenggor, covering 15,200 hectares which is dotted with hundreds of islands.

The area has been identified as an Environmentally Sensitive Area (ESA) Rank 1 under the Malaysian National Physical Plan and recognized by Birdlife International as an Important Bird Area. The Malaysian federal government has labelled the area as a whole as an essential water catchment area and part of Central Forest Spine and plans to protect the forest under the Malaysian National Forestry Act. Despite that, between the two, only part of Belum Forest Reserve has been gazetted as a State Park while the rest are production forest open for development. Temenggor in particular is facing considerable deforestation due to logging. Environmental organizations such as Malaysian Nature Society and the World Wildlife Fund have been lobbying both the state and the federal government to gazette the area as a park. The state government of Perak, however, has resisted the effort, citing that logging provides the state with more than RM 30 million in revenue. Nevertheless, the state government gazetted 1,175 km^{2} (454 sq mi), part of the Belum forest reserve as state park on May 3, 2007.

There is a plan to convert the natural forest to plantation forest along the East-West Highway.

=== Fauna and flora ===
Belum-Temenggor's relatively untouched forest is home to a wide variety of flora and fauna including 14 of the world's most threatened mammals including the Malayan tiger, Indian elephant, white handed gibbon, Malaysian sunbear and tapir. Other animals include seladang, wild boars, numerous species of deer, pythons and cobras.

As of 2019, due to poaching and the depletion of prey, the number of tigers in Belum-Temengor Forest Reserve has declined about 60 percent over a period of 7-8 years, from approximately 60 to 23.

Belum Temenggor is home to over 300 avian species. It is the only existing forest where all 10 species of hornbill that inhabit Malaysia are found, namely the white-crowned hornbill, bushy-crested hornbill, wrinkled hornbill, wreathed hornbill, plain-pouched hornbill, black hornbill, Oriental pied hornbill, rhinoceros hornbill, great hornbill and helmeted hornbill. In the forest, one can also find 3,000 species of flowering plants, including 3 species of Rafflesia, the world's largest flower.

Malaysia is home to a variety of different insect and arthropod species. Notable examples would include the stalk-eyed fly, violin fly, lantern fly, and a variety of stick insects. The Brown marmorated stink bug is native to parts of East Asia and has now become an invasive species in Europe and North America. Scientists are considering introducing the parasitoid wasp Trissolcus japonicus, which preys on the eggs of the stink bug.

== See also ==
- Geography of Malaysia
- Temenggor Lake
