= Temenggor Dam =

Coordinates: 5°24′24″N 101°18′04″E

Temengor Dam
- Interactive map of Temengor Dam
- Official name: Empangan Temengor
- Country: Malaysia
- Status: Operational
- Opening date: 1972

The Temenggor Dam or Temenggor Hydro-Electric Project or Temenggor Power Station (Malay: Empangan Temenggor) is a dam in Gerik, Perak, Malaysia. It is located on Perak River about 200 km northeast of Ipoh. Construction of the dam impounded Temenggor Lake.

== Power station ==
The power station is a hydroelectric power station, using 4 Hitachi turbines of 87 MW installed capacity and the average annual energy generation 900 million units. The station is operated by Tenaga Nasional. Since 1987 Temenggor has been unmanned and is remotely operated via a SCADA system at the Bersia Group Control Centre. In the late 1990s, facilities were added to enable automatic generation control by TNB's National Load Despatch Centre in Kuala Lumpur.

== Overview ==
Construction started in January 1974 and completed in mid-1978. The first unit commissioned on 1 October 1977.

== Technical specifications ==
The permanent dam components are as follows:

- Main Dam
  - Maximum height above foundation of 128 metres (420 ft), and crest length of 537 metres (1,762 ft), volume of fill is 70.9 million cubic metres.
  - Crest elevation is 258 metres (846 ft) above sea level (ASL), Full Supply Level (FSL) is at EL 248.42mSLE, average operating level is at EL244.00mSLE, minimum operating level for Unit 1, Unit 3 and Unit 4 is at EL 236.5mSLE. For Unit 2, it can go down to EL 221mSLE.
  - Reservoir area at 245 metres (804 ft) ASL is 152 square kilometres (59 sq mi). Storage volume is 5,300 million cubic meters at EL 244.00mSLE. At FSL total storage is 6,050 million cubic meters.
- Power Intake Structure - 4 bays.
- Spillway- free flow spillway, weir with chute and flip bucket.
  - Maximum discharge capacity at Reservoir Flood Level at EL 252.00mSLE is 2830m3/s. At this elevation the dam is holding 890million cubic meters of flood water or equivalent to 3months of annual average rainfall. This water will be discharge to downstream gradually in not less than one month.
- Power Tunnels - 4 tunnels.
  - Length about 850 ft
  - Average diameter 5.5m, steel lined
- Powerhouse
  - surface powerhouse
  - with 4 penstocks to powerhouse comprising 4 turbines of 87MW each, 4 air-cooled generators of 100MVA each and 4 transformers of 100MVA each.
  - Turbine type is vertical Francis, manufactured by HITACHI of Japan. Turbine shaft rated output is about 90MW at rated gross head of 101m.
  - Maximum plant discharge is 4X100m3/s.
  - Plant rated annual energy production is 870GWh based on annual rainfall of 3,700 million cubic metres.

Temenggor Dam is now the third largest dam in Malaysia. It was the largest dam and largest hydroelectric generation facility upon completion in 1979, before being overtaken by the Kenyir Dam in 1985. It holds a special place in the history of Malaysia for its military role in flooding the Upper Perak River and cutting off the communist terrorists' infiltration route from the Betong salient in Thailand.

== See also ==
- Tenaga Nasional
