= Bintang Mountains =

Mountain range in Malaysia

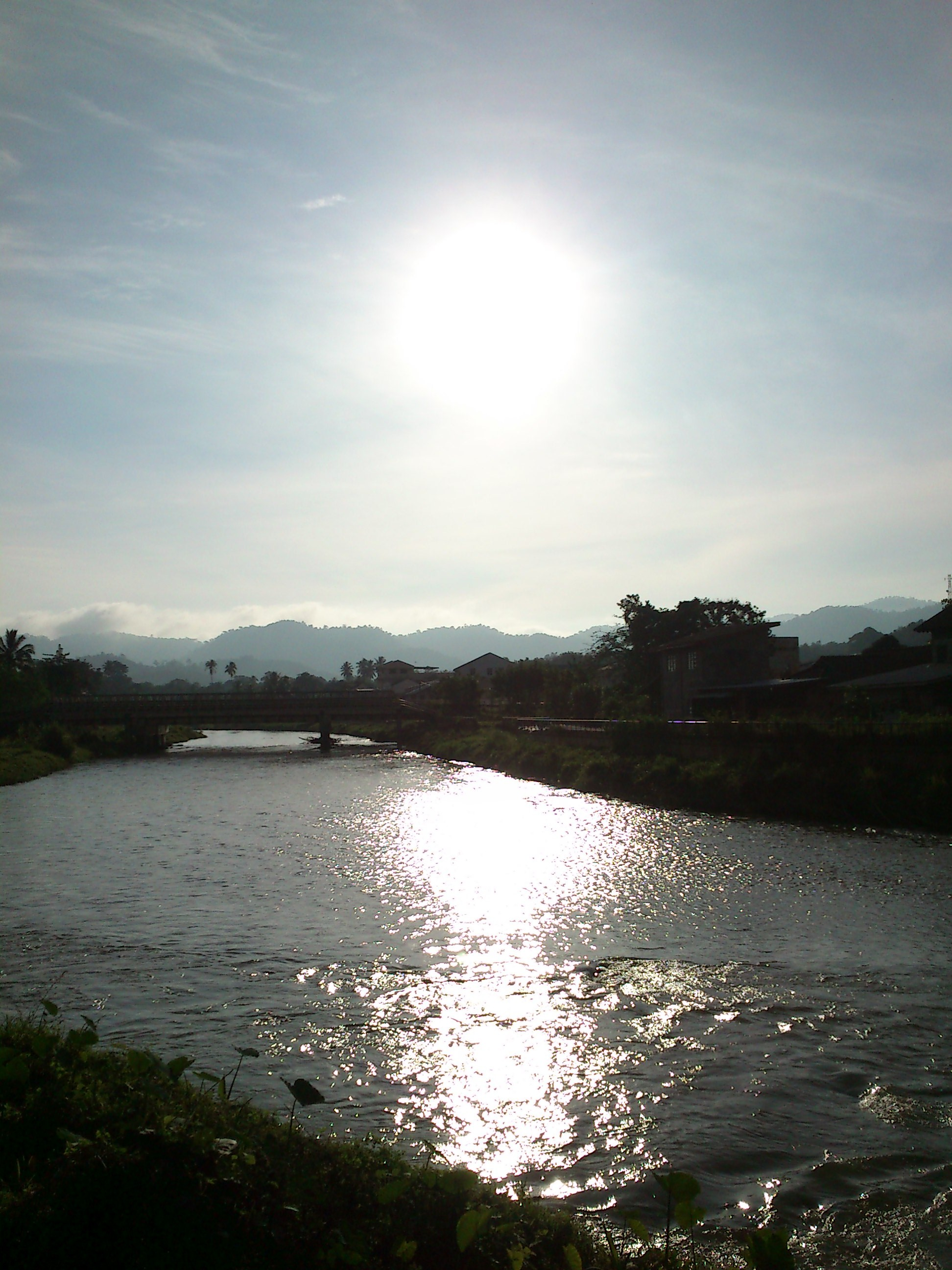
Bintang Mountains, seen near Baling, Kedah. The range forms the frontier between Kedah and Perak.

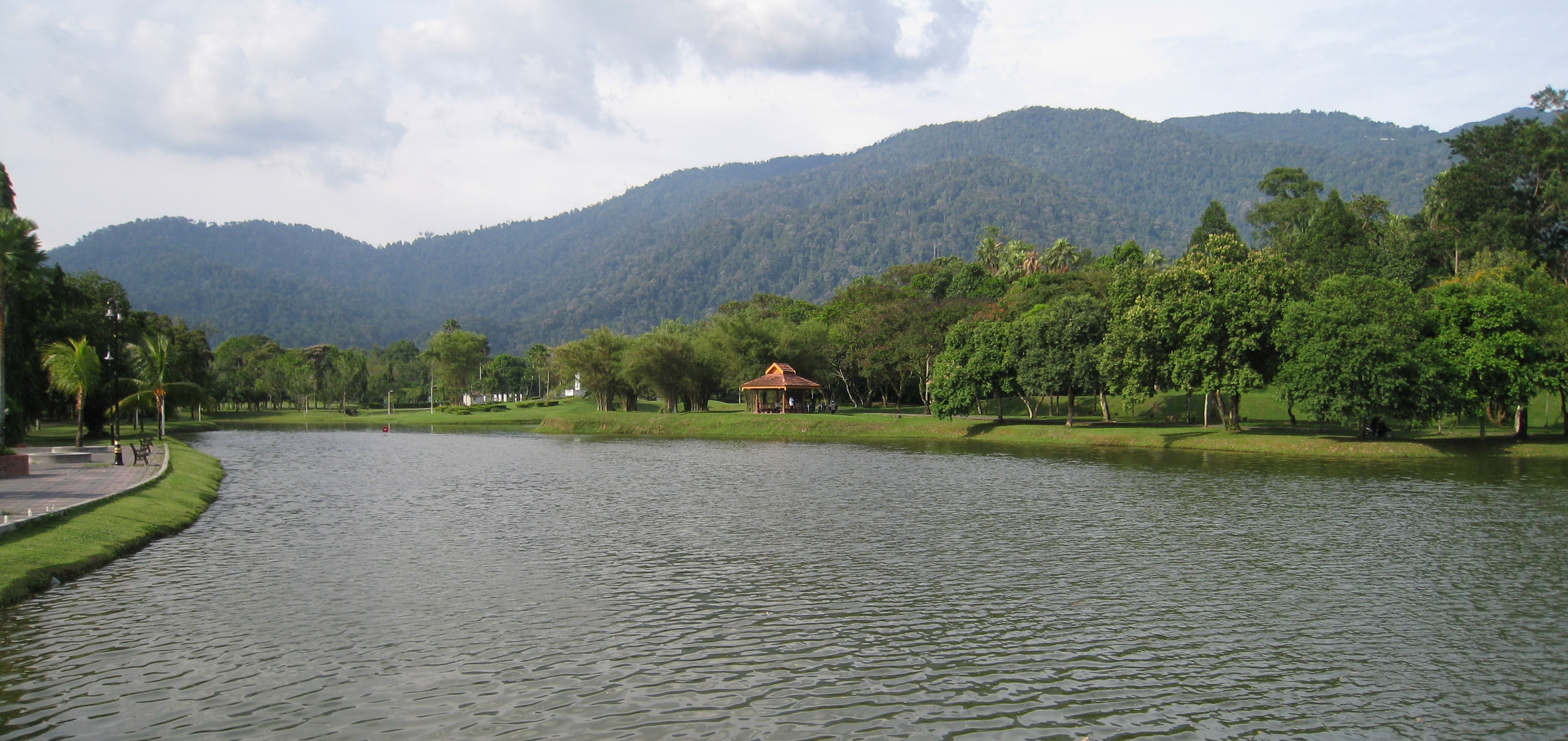
The mountain range as viewed from the Taiping Lake Gardens, Taiping, Perak

The Bintang Mountains (Malay: Banjaran Bintang) are mountain range, part of the Tenasserim Hills, that encompasses the states of Kedah and Perak, Malaysia. It runs from the province of Yala, southern Thailand in the north, straddling along the Kedah–Perak border and ends in the south near Beruas, Manjung District, western Perak. Within Perak, the mountain range forms a natural boundary between the districts of Kuala Kangsar and Hulu Perak in the east and Larut, Matang and Selama in the west. It borders the Titiwangsa Mountains, Peninsular Malaysia's chief mountain range, to its east. The range divides the basins of Kerian and Perak Rivers in the west and east respectively.

Mount Bintang, the range's namesake, is the highest peak at 1,882 m (6,174 ft) above sea level. Several of other prominent peaks that are part of the range are Bukit Bokbak (1,199 m [3,933 ft]), Gunung Inas (1,801 m [5,909 ft]), Gunung Bubu (1,657 m) and Gunung Ulu Jernih (1,577 m [5,174 ft]).

== Tourist attractions ==
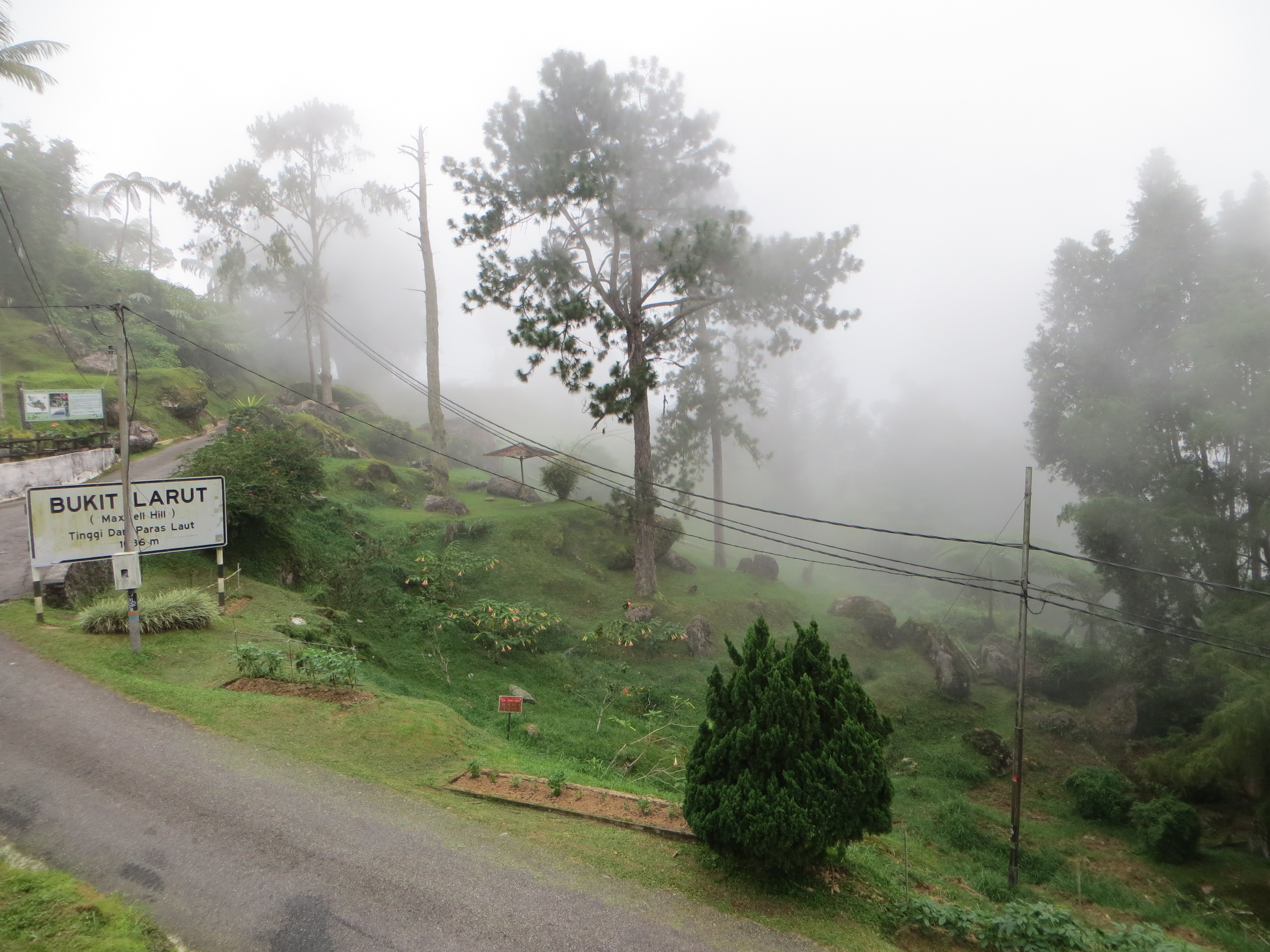
Bukit Larut, blanketed in fog

In the vicinity of Taiping, Bukit Larut, formerly Maxwell Hill, is a famous hill resort nestled on the western slopes of the mountain range.

== See also ==
- Geography of Malaysia
