= Lenggong =

Geographical area in Perak, Malaysia

Archaeological Heritage of the Lenggong Valley
UNESCO World Heritage Site
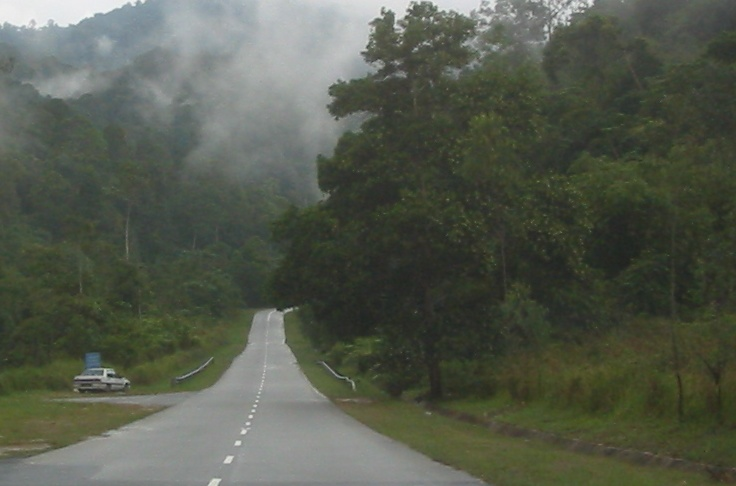

- Location within Malaysia
- Location: Hulu Perak District, Perak, Malaysia
- Includes: 1. Bukit Bunuh – Kota Tampan; 2. Bukit Jawa; 3. Bukit Kepala Gajah; 4. Bukit Gua Harimau
- Criteria: Cultural: (iii)(iv)
- Reference: 1396
- Inscription: 2012 (36th Session)
- Area: 398.64 ha (985.1 acres)
- Buffer zone: 1,786.77 ha (4,415.2 acres)
- Coordinates: 5°4′4.47″N 100°58′20.38″E

Lenggong or Lenggong Valley (Malay: Lembah Lenggong) is a geographical area defined by the mountain ranges of Bintang in the west and Titiwangsa to its east. It is a rural area, with small kampongs surrounded by green vegetation and limestone hills with numerous caves.

The Lenggong Valley is one of Peninsular Malaysia's most important areas for archaeology, as excavations have revealed many traces of Malaysia's prehistory, with finds such as cave drawings, jewellery, pottery, weapons and stone tools. It is the site of one of the oldest known place of human activity in the Peninsula. The Lenggong Valley was listed by UNESCO as a World Heritage Site on 30 June 2012.

== Archaeology ==
Evidence of archaic humans in the Lenggong Valley has been discovered from as early as the Lower Paleolithic. Archaeological investigation at Bukit Bunuh in 2007 uncovered a stone hand axe embedded in suevite from a meteorite impact 1.83 million years ago, indicating that human habitation of the area began before this time. Further evidence of human habitation at Bukit Bunuh has been uncovered dating back to a range of time periods, including findings from 500 kya, 270 kya, 40 kya, and 30 kya—indicative of a continuous human population in the area. This population is generally classified as part of the Homo erectus species.

Beginning in 1938, excavations around the contemporary village of Kota Tampan uncovered microliths, establishing the presence of a Paleolithic community in the area. The breakage pattern of quartzite flakes at this site have provided evidence that the area featured a lake at the time of the "Tampanian" community, which is no longer present. The age of these archaeological findings was debated throughout the 20th century between the Late Pleistocene and the Middle Pleistocene. They have since been dated using ash from the eruption of Mount Toba to 70 kya, in the Middle Paleolithic within the Late Pleistocene.

Excavations in 1996 at the site of Bukit Jawa uncovered 150,000–250,000 microliths and pieces of debitage, initially described as a "Paleolithic tool workshop" and tentatively identified as being from the Middle Paleolithic. In 2003, the material was estimated to be 200,000 years old.

Gua Gunung Runtuh is situated in Bukit Kepala Gajah or Elephant's Head Hill. In the same hill other caves have yielded archaeological remains such as stone tools and food remnants. The caves were probably used as temporary shelters as seasonal or hunting camps, whereas Gua Gunung Runtuh was lived in for longer periods. Gua Harimau, or Tiger Cave, is a site about 3 kilometres away from Gua Gunung Runtuh which was probably used as a burial ground about 3,000 – 5,000 years ago as seven human skeletons have been found at the site along with bronze axes and various articles of jewellery. The bronze axes show that there was an early Bronze tradition in Malaysia, as well as in north Thailand and China. It is the earliest use of metal in south-east Asia. Porcelain containers of various shapes and sizes were also found containing meat and snail shells. Archaeological digs in other caves have revealed pottery, axes stone tools and flakes. Food also remains, and in some sites, human bones. Unfortunately, some caves have been disturbed by guano diggers and any remains have been lost.

Negrito cave drawings have been found at various sites but are not prehistoric, as they are only about 100 years old. Gua Badak is one of the main places for these drawings, situated about 10 kilometres north of Lenggong. The Lanoh Negrito made the illustrative recordings of their every life. The charcoal drawings were first discovered and documented in the 1920s by Ivor Evans. They were then thought to have been lost by quarrying, but were rediscovered in 1992. Modern graffiti covers some of the original drawings. The Negritos used the caves as shelters during hunting trips. The sketches depict things such as animals, people, trees, mats, bicycles and cars. Apart from the charcoal drawings, they made white pictures by scrapping away the limestone rock.

Most of the old troglodytes or cave dwellers of the Malay Peninsula temporarily lived in caves and rock shelters. They lived mainly by hunting, evidence shown by the remains of animal bones and molluscs. The people may have painted their bodies using red iron oxide. They used stones and slabs for grinding up substances such as salt, and all their tools were made of stones. Flakes were used as knives or scrappers. So it can be seen that the Lenggong area is very important as it contains much evidence relating to the prehistory of Malaysia. It is the oldest area where remains have been found, and all the sites are situated conveniently within a small area.

Gua Puteri is a natural tunnel which pierces Bukit Kajang. There are no archaeological findings here, but the cave is known for its legends. Two stalagmites are believed to be a prince and princess who guard the cave. Locals say that if children climb up the stalagmites they will fall sick.

=== Perak Man ===
The oldest human skeleton found in Malaysia was at Gua Gunung Runtuh in the state of Perak in Peninsular Malaysia. The cave was his final resting place situated in Bukit Kepala Gajah or Elephant's Head Hill in the Lenggong Valley of Ulu Perak. The skeleton was a male with a height of approximately 157 cm, estimated to have been in his 50s. The skeleton was discovered in 1991 and has been dated to around 11,000 years old. It is one of the most complete skeletons for this time period in this region.

He was buried in the fetal position, with deposits of animal bones at his right shoulder, to his left and to his bottom, and deposits of stone tools around the body. There were no other burials in the cave. The Perak Man had a malformed left hand, his left arm and hand were much smaller compared to his right arm and hand. This deformity could be from a genetic disorder known as brachymesophalangia. This evidence is further supported by the fact that his spine is curved towards the right due to living with only one good hand.

The bones that were found deposited near him were identified to have come from wild boar, monkey, monitor lizard and deer and are thought to have been food deposits. There were about ten stone tools scattered around the body, and most of them were pebble tools and some hammer stones.

One conclusion that the study made was that he must have been an important member of society because his burial was very elaborate and labour-intensive. The Perak Man was put into the pit with food offerings, covered with small shells, then more offerings and tools, and then another shell layer, followed by a final dirt layer. Furthermore, he was estimated to have been in his 50s which was very old for a person from that era with a disability. People had to take care of him – and people would not take it upon themselves unless he was respected or highly ranked in some sort of social hierarchy.

In 2004, another skeleton was found at Gua Teluk Kelawar in Lenggong, Perak by a team of Universiti Sains Malaysia (USM) archaeologists. This skeleton was dubbed the 'Perak woman', who was 148 cm in height and was believed to have been in her 40s. The Perak Women is believed to have died 8,000 years ago.

== Accessibility ==
Lenggong is accessible by trunk roads connecting it with neighbouring towns and cities. The town of Lenggong is situated some 100 kilometres north of Ipoh on the Kuala Kangsar to Gerik road (highway 76). The road to Lenggong is surrounded mostly by oil palm estates and jungles.

To visit Lenggong, from the North–South Expressway take Exit No.143 at Kuala Kangsar – that's about 3 hours away from Kuala Lumpur. Then take Route 76 to Lenggong.
