= Hulu Perak District =

- District of Perak
- Daerah Hulu Perak
- Interactive map of Hulu Perak District
- Location of Hulu Perak District in Malaysia
- Coordinates: 5°20′N 101°15′E
- Country: Malaysia
- State: Perak
- Seat: Gerik
- Local area government(s): Gerik District Council (Gerik); Lenggong District Council (Lenggong (town)); Pengkalan Hulu District Council (Pengkalan Hulu)

Government
  - District officer: n/a

Area
  - Total: 6,560.43 km^{2} (2,533.00 sq mi)

Population (2010)
  - Total: 89,067
  - Estimate (2015): 97,300
  - Density: 13.576/km^{2} (35.163/sq mi)
- Time zone: UTC+8 (MST)
  - Summer (DST): UTC+8 (Not observed)
- Postcode: 33100 (Pengkalan Hulu); 33300 (Gerik); 33400 (Lenggong)
- Calling code: +6-05
- Vehicle registration plates: A

Hulu Perak District (lit. 'Upper Perak') is the largest district in Perak, Malaysia. The seat of the district is Gerik, which is also the largest town of the district.

The highest point in the district is the Ulu Titi Basah peak in the Titiwangsa Mountains. The peak is 1,533 m (5,030 ft) tall and is located near the Malaysia–Thailand border and Temenggor Lake.

To the east, it borders the districts of Jeli and Gua Musang in Kelantan; to the west, it borders Baling and Kulim Districts of Kedah; to the south, it borders the district of Kuala Kangsar; while to the south-west, it borders the district of Larut, Matang and Selama. Hulu Perak also shares a border with Yala province's Betong district on the border with Thailand.

== History ==
In 1511, after the fall of the Malacca Sultanate to the Portuguese, Sultan Mahmud Shah retreated and established his government in Bentan. In 1526 the Portuguese attacked his domain again and forced him to retreat to Kampar where he re-establish his rule.

At that time, Tun Saban had moved to Upper Patani and stayed at Beredung Budi. He then moved to Belum Forest in Hulu Perak, founded a village at a place called Relap Hati, and became the chief of the peoples in Belum Forest.

For sometime until the 19th century, a good part of this district was under the sovereignty of Siam, as part of the old Malay Kingdom of Reman. The area then under Thai control included what is today Gerik, Pengkalan Hulu (Kroh), Kerunai, the Belum forest and the Temenggor Lakes. The capital of Reman was near Pengkalan Hulu.

In 1882, the border between the British protected state of Perak and the Siamese vassal state of Reman was delimited at Bukit Nasha, some 5 km south of Gerik town.

An adjustment in 1899 transferred Gerik town and the surrounding commune to the Federated Malay States, which Perak was part of.

The present-day border, part of the longer Malaysia–Thailand border, was finalised in 1909, when the districts of Pengkalan Hulu, Kerunai, Belukar Semang, Belum and the present-day Temenggor Lakes were transferred to the Federated Malay States. The British also gained control of Perlis, Kedah, Kelantan and Terengganu.

== Administrative divisions ==
Map of Hulu Perak District

Hulu Perak District is divided into 10 mukims and three district councils, which are:

- Under Pengkalan Hulu District Council
  - Pengkalan Hulu (with Klian Intan)
  - Belukar Semang
- Under Gerik District Council
  - Gerik (with Kuala Rui)
  - Belum
  - Kenering (with Lawin)
  - Kerunai
  - Temenggor (with Banding Island)
- Under Lenggong District Council
  - Lenggong
  - Durian Pipit (with Tasik Raban)
  - Temelong (with Kota Tampan)

The municipalities of Pengkalan Hulu and Lenggong are autonomous subdistricts (daerah kecil).

== Demographics ==
Historical population
Year	Pop.	±%
1991	81,636	—
2000	82,551	+1.1%
2010	89,926	+8.9%
2020	95,076	+5.7%

The following is based on Department of Statistics Malaysia 2010 census.

Ethnic groups in Hulu Perak, 2010 census
Ethnicity	Population	Percentage
Bumiputera	77,386	86.9%
Chinese	8,628	9.6%
Indian	1,658	1.9%
Others	1,395	1.6%
Total	89,067	100%

== Federal Parliament and State Assembly Seats ==
Hulu Perak district representatives in the Federal Parliament (Dewan Rakyat)
Parliament	Seat Name	Member of Parliament	Party
P54	Gerik	Fathul Huzir Ayob	Perikatan Nasional (PPBM)
P55	Lenggong	Shamsul Anuar Nasarah	Barisan Nasional (UMNO)
P62	Sungai Siput	Kesavan Subramaniam	Pakatan Harapan (PKR)

Hulu Perak district representatives in the State Legislative Assembly
Parliament	State	Seat Name	State Assemblyman	Party
P54	N01	Pengkalan Hulu	Mohamad Amin Roslan	Perikatan Nasional (PAS)
P54	N02	Temengor	Salbiah Mohamed	Barisan Nasional (UMNO)
P55	N03	Kenering	Husaini Ariffin	Perikatan Nasional (PAS)
P55	N04	Kota Tampan	Saarani Mohamad	Barisan Nasional (UMNO)
P62	N21	Lintang	Mohd Zolkafly Harun	Barisan Nasional (UMNO)

== See also ==
- Districts of Malaysia
