= Thailand National Games =

Multi-sport event in Thailand

Games
- Senior Games; Para Games; Youth Games

Thailand National Games
- Debut: 1967 in Bangkok, Thailand
- Current: 2018 in Chiang Rai, Thailand

Games
- 1967; 1968; 1969; 1970; 1971; 1972; 1973; 1974; 1975; 1976; 1977; 1978; 1979; 1981; 1982; 1983; 1984; 1985; 1986; 1987; 1988; 1989; 1990; 1991; 1992; 1993; 1994; 1995; 1996; 1997; 1998; 2000; 2002; 2004; 2006; 2007; 2008; 2009; 2010; 2011; 2012; 2013; 2014; 2015; 2017; 2018; 2020; 2022; 2024

The Thailand National Games (Thai: กีฬาแห่งชาติ) is a national multi-sport event held every two years among athletes from all over Thailand. The games were regulated by the Organization of the Sport of Thailand (OST) from the first games in Bangkok, Thailand, from the 1967 games until the 1984 games. Since the 1985 games, they have been organized by the Sports Authority of Thailand (SAT), after the breakup of the Organization of the Sport of Thailand. The games are recognized by the Ministry of Tourism and Sports, and are described as the largest multi-sport event in Thailand.

In its history, twenty-six provinces have hosted the National Games. Seventy-seven provinces have participated in the games, including Bueng Kan, which was the most recent participant, in 2011.

The last games were held in Chiang Rai, Thailand in 2018.

== History ==
=== Formation ===
Thailand National Games, formerly known as Thailand Regional Games, was organized by the Organization of the Sport of Thailand (OST; currently, the Sports Authority of Thailand; SAT) among qualified Thai athletes at the 1967 Southeast Asian Peninsular Games held in Bangkok, Thailand. The first Thailand Regional Games were held in Bangkok from 1 to 5 November 1967. The competition was represented by five regions. After that, the fifth Thailand Regional Games was added from 5 to 10 regions by Bangkok moved from the Region 1 to the Region 10.

In 1984, the Organization of the Sport of Thailand committee was renamed to "Thailand National Games" and used in 1985 Games, with changed the objective of the Thailand National Games to make the strengthen of Thai sport.

On 23 February 1999, the Thai cabinet agreed with Sports Authority of Thailand (SAT) to host the Thailand National Games every two years in 2002, 2004 and 2006, the games was represented from 10 regions to 76 provinces.

However, the Thai cabinet in 2006 agreed with SAT to host the Thailand National Games every year from two years in 2007, because to continuation in the development of the Thai sport but also represented by the provinces.

On 26 July 2013, the Thai cabinet assembled at the SAT congress and agreed that the Thailand National Games should be held every two years instead of one year, beginning in 2018, because at present time, many national and international events affect the rehearse and budget needed to send the athletes to the events.

=== Crises ===
In 1978 the Games were affected by the 1978 Udon Thani floods. The Udon Thani 1978 Organising Committee postponed this competition from October 1978 to January 1979.

In 2011 the Games were affected by the 2011 Thailand floods. The Khon Kaen 2011 Organising Committee postponed the competition from November 2011 to March 2012.

In 2015 the Games' opening ceremony was postponed from 11 December 2015 to 12 December 2015 due to the "Bike for dad" event, while the 2016 Games were cancelled due to King Bhumibol's death.

== Royal flame ==
The royal flame is the flame from the king to light the cauldron during competitions. The flame was introduced at the 1967 Thailand Regional Games in Bangkok. The organizing committee must contact the Office of His Majesty's Principal Private Secretary to receive the flame. After the king knows the contact, the governor of the host receives the flame from the king at the palace.

The flame was lit at Wat Phra Si Rattana Satsadaram in Bangkok once a year. This flame is used for royal ceremonies, cremation ceremonies, or sporting event ceremonies, including the Southeast Asian Games, Asian Games, and Summer Universiade.

== Provincial sports associations ==
=== Zone I (East and Bangkok) ===
Province	Provincial association	Code	Region	Debut
Bangkok	Bangkok Sport Association	กท BKK	Region X	1972
Chachoengsao	Chachoengsao Sport Association	ฉช CCO	Region II	1967
Chanthaburi	Chanthaburi Sport Association	จบ CTI	Region II	1967
Chonburi	Chonburi Sport Association	ชบ CBI	Region II	1967
Nakhon Nayok	Nakhon Nayok Sport Association	นย NYK	Region II	1967
Nonthaburi	Nonthaburi Sport Association	นบ NBI	Region I	1967
Pathum Thani	Pathum Thani Sport Association	ปท PTI	Region I	1967
Prachinburi	Prachinburi Sport Association	ปจ PRI	Region II	1967
Rayong	Rayong Sport Association	รย RYG	Region II	1967
Sa Kaeo	Sa Kaeo Sport Association	สก SKO	Region II	1995
Samut Prakan	Samut Prakan Sport Association	สป SPK	Region I	1967
Samut Sakhon	Samut Sakhon Sport Association	สค SKN	Region VII	1967
Trat	Trat Sport Association	ตร TRT	Region II	1967

=== Zone II (Central and West) ===
Province	Provincial association	Code	Region	Debut
Ang Thong	Ang Thong Sport Association	อท ATG	Region I	1967
Chai Nat	Chai Nat Sport Association	ชน CNT	Region I	1967
Kanchanaburi	Kanchanaburi Sport Association	กจ KRI	Region VII	1967
Lopburi	Lopburi Sport Association	ลบ LBI	Region I	1967
Nakhon Pathom	Nakhon Pathom Sport Association	นฐ NPT	Region VII	1967
Phetchaburi	Phetchaburi Sport Association	พบ PBI	Region VII	1967
Phra Nakhon Si Ayutthaya	Phra Nakhon Si Ayutthaya Sport Association	อย AYA	Region I	1967
Prachuap Khiri Khan	Prachuap Khiri Khan Sport Association	ปข PKN	Region VII	1967
Ratchaburi	Ratchaburi Sport Association	รบ RBR	Region VII	1967
Samut Songkhram	Samut Songkhram Sport Association	สส SKM	Region VII	1967
Saraburi	Saraburi Sport Association	สบ SRI	Region I	1967
Sing Buri	Sing Buri Sport Association	สห SBR	Region I	1967
Suphanburi	Suphanburi Sport Association	สพ SPB	Region VII	1967
Uthai Thani	Uthai Thani Sport Association	อน UTI	Region VI	1967

=== Zone III (Northeast) ===
Province	Provincial association	Code	Region	Debut
Amnat Charoen	Amnat Charoen Sport Association	อจ ACR	Region IV	1995
Bueng Kan	Bueng Kan Sport Association	บก BKN	Region IV	2012
Buriram	Buriram Sport Association	บร BRM	Region III	1967
Chaiyaphum	Chaiyaphum Sport Association	ชย CPM	Region III	1967
Kalasin	Kalasin Sport Association	กส KSN	Region IV	1967
Khon Kaen	Khon Kaen Sport Association	กพ KKN	Region IV	1967
Loei	Loei Sport Association	ลย LEI	Region IV	1967
Maha Sarakham	Maha Sarakham Sport Association	มค MKM	Region IV	1967
Mukdahan	Mukdahan Sport Association	มห MDH	Region IV	1994
Nakhon Phanom	Nakhon Phanom Sport Association	นพ NPM	Region IV	1967
Nakhon Ratchasima	Nakhon Ratchasima Sport Association	นม NMA	Region III	1967
Nong Bua Lamphu	Nong Bua Lamphu Sport Association	นภ NBP	Region IV	1995
Nong Khai	Nong Khai Sport Association	นค NKI	Region IV	1967
Roi Et	Roi Et Sport Association	รอ RET	Region IV	1967
Sakon Nakhon	Sakon Nakhon Sport Association	สน SNK	Region IV	1967
Sisaket	Sisaket Sport Association	ศก SSK	Region III	1967
Surin	Surin Sport Association	สร SRN	Region III	1967
Ubon Ratchathani	Ubon Ratchathani Sport Association	อบ UBN	Region III	1967
Udon Thani	Udon Thani Sport Association	อด UDN	Region IV	1967
Yasothon	Yasothon Sport Association	ยส YST	Region III	1974

=== Zone IV (South) ===
Province	Provincial association	Code	Region	Debut
Chumphon	Chumphon Sport Association	ชพ CPN	Region VIII	1967
Krabi	Krabi Sport Association	กบ KBI	Region VIII	1967
Nakhon Si Thammarat	Nakhon Si Thammarat Sport Association	นศ NRT	Region VIII	1967
Narathiwat	Narathiwat Sport Association	นธ NWT	Region IX	1967
Pattani	Pattani Sport Association	ปน PTN	Region IX	1967
Phang Nga	Phang Nga Sport Association	พง PNA	Region VIII	1967
Phatthalung	Phatthalung Sport Association	พท PLG	Region IX	1967
Phuket	Phuket Sport Association	ภก PKT	Region VIII	1967
Ranong	Ranong Sport Association	รน RNG	Region VIII	1967
Satun	Satun Sport Association	สต STN	Region IX	1967
Songkhla	Songkhla Sport Association	สข SKA	Region VIII	1967
Surat Thani	Surat Thani Sport Association	สฎ SNI	Region VIII	1967
Trang	Trang Sport Association	ตง TRG	Region IX	1967
Yala	Yala Sport Association	ยล YLA	Region IX	1967

=== Zone V (North) ===
Province	Provincial association	Code	Region	Debut
Chiang Rai	Chiang Rai Sport Association	ชร CRI	Region V	1967
Chiang Mai	Chiang Mai Sport Association	ชม CMI	Region V	1967
Kamphaeng Phet	Kamphaeng Phet Sport Association	กพ KPT	Region VI	1967
Lampang	Lampang Sport Association	ลป LPG	Region V	1967
Lamphun	Lamphun Sport Association	ลพ LPN	Region V	1967
Mae Hong Son	Mae Hong Son Sport Association	มส MSN	Region V	1967
Nakhon Sawan	Nakhon Sawan Sport Association	นว NSN	Region VI	1967
Nan	Nan Sport Association	นน NAN	Region V	1967
Phayao	Phayao Sport Association	พย PYO	Region V	1979
Phichit	Phichit Sport Association	พจ PCT	Region VI	1967
Phitsanulok	Phitsanulok Sport Association	พล PLK	Region VI	1967
Phetchabun	Phetchabun Sport Association	พช PBN	Region VI	1967
Phrae	Phrae Sport Association	พร PRE	Region V	1967
Sukhothai	Sukhothai Sport Association	สท STI	Region VI	1967
Tak	Tak Sport Association	ตก TAK	Region VI	1967
Uttaradit	Uttaradit Sport Association	อต UTT	Region VI	1967

=== Former teams ===
Former province
Province	Region	Debut	Last
Phra Nakhon	Region VI	1967	1971
Thonburi	Region VI	1967	1971

Regions in 1967
Regions	Provinces	List
1	17	Chiang Mai, Chiang Rai, Kamphaeng Phet, Lampang, Lamphun, Mae Hong Son, Nakhon Sawan, Nan, Phetchabun, Phayao, Phrae, Phichit, Phitsanulok, Sukhothai, Tak, Uttaradit, Uthai Thani
2	15	Buriram, Chaiyaphum, Kalasin, Khon Kaen, Loei, Maha Sarakham, Nakhon Phanom, Nakhon Ratchasima, Nong Khai, Roi Et, Sakon Nakhon, Sisaket, Surin, Ubon Ratchathani, Udon Thani
3	16	Ang Thong, Chai Nat, Kanchanaburi, Lopburi, Nakhon Pathom, Nonthaburi, Pathum Thani, Phra Nakhon Si Ayutthaya, Phetchaburi, Prachuap Khiri Khan, Ratchaburi, Samut Sakhon, Samut Songkhram, Suphanburi, Saraburi, Singburi
4	9	Bangkok, Chachoengsao, Chanthaburi, Chonburi, Nakhon Nayok, Prachinburi, Rayong, Samut Prakan, Trat
5	14	Chumphon, Krabi, Nakhon Si Thammarat, Narathiwat, Pattani, Phang Nga, Phatthalung, Phuket, Ranong, Satun, Songkhla, Surat Thani, Trang, Yala

Regions in 1968
Regions	Provinces	List
1	9	Ang Thong, Bangkok, Chai Nat, Lopburi, Nonthaburi, Pathum Thani, Phra Nakhon Si Ayutthaya, Saraburi Singburi
2	8	Chachoengsao, Chanthaburi, Chonburi, Nakhon Nayok, Prachinburi, Rayong, Samut Prakan, Trat
3	6	Buriram, Chaiyaphum, Nakhon Ratchasima, Sisaket, Surin, Ubon Ratchathani
4	9	Kalasin, Khon Kaen, Loei, Maha Sarakham, Nakhon Phanom, Nong Khai, Roi Et, Sakon Nakhon, Udon Thani
5	8	Chiang Mai, Chiang Rai, Lampang, Lamphun, Mae Hong Son, Nan, Phayao, Phrae
6	9	Kamphaeng Phet, Nakhon Sawan, Phetchabun, Phichit, Phitsanulok, Sukhothai, Tak, Uttaradit, Uthai Thani
7	8	Kanchanaburi, Nakhon Pathom, Phetchaburi, Prachuap Khiri Khan, Ratchaburi, Samut Sakhon, Samut Songkhram, Suphanburi
8	7	Chumphon, Krabi, Nakhon Si Thammarat, Phang Nga, Phuket, Ranong, Surat Thani
9	7	Narathiwat, Pattani, Phatthalung, Satun, Songkhla, Trang, Yala

Regions in 1972
Regions	Provinces	List
1	8	Ang Thong, Chai Nat, Lopburi, Nonthaburi, Pathum Thani, Phra Nakhon Si Ayutthaya, Saraburi, Singburi
2	8	Chachoengsao, Chanthaburi, Chonburi, Nakhon Nayok,Prachinburi, Rayong, Samut Prakan, Trat
3	7	Buriram, Chaiyaphum, Nakhon Ratchasima, Sisaket, Surin, Ubon Ratchathani, Yasothon
4	9	Kalasin, Khon Kaen, Loei, Maha Sarakham, Nakhon Phanom, Nong Khai, Roi Et, Sakon Nakhon, Udon Thani
5	8	Chiang Mai, Chiang Rai, Lampang, Lamphun, Mae Hong Son, Nan, Phayao, Phrae
6	9	Kamphaeng Phet, Nakhon Sawan, Phetchabun, Phichit, Phitsanulok, Sukhothai, Tak, Uttaradit, Uthai Thani
7	8	Kanchanaburi, Nakhon Pathom, Phetchaburi, Prachuap Khiri Khan, Ratchaburi, Samut Sakhon, Samut Songkhram, Suphanburi
8	7	Chumphon, Krabi, Nakhon Si Thammarat, Phang Nga, Phuket, Ranong, Surat Thani
9	7	Narathiwat, Pattani, Phatthalung, Satun, Songkhla, Trang, Yala
10	1	Bangkok

== Editions ==
Host cities of the games through 2020

Year	Games	Host province	Dates	Teams	Athletes	Sports	Top placed team
1967	1	Bangkok	1–5 November	5	716	16	Region 4 (Bangkok and Eastern)
1968	2	Chiang Mai	3–9 December	9	1,700	14	Region 1 (South Central)
1969	3	Songkhla	24–30 November	9	1,800	11	Region 1 (South Central)
1970	4	Nakhon Ratchasima	1–7 November	9	1,800	12	Region 1 (South Central)
1971	5	Nakhon Sawan	2–8 December	9	1,901	13	Region 1 (South Central)
1972	6	Ratchaburi	2–8 December	10	2,167	13	Region 7 (Western)
1973	7	Nakhon Si Thammarat	23–29 August	10	2,485	14	Region 10 (Bangkok)
1974	8	Chonburi	3–9 December	10	2,485	15	Region 10 (Bangkok)
1975	9	Lopburi	28 November-4 December	10	2,504	14	Region 10 (Bangkok)
1976	10	Udon Thani	4–10 December	10	2,480	14	Region 10 (Bangkok)
1977	11	Lopburi	11–17 December	10	2,567	14	Region 10 (Bangkok)
1978	12	Ubon Ratchathani	24–30 January 1979	10	2,508	14	Region 10 (Bangkok)
1979	13	Lampang	23–29 December	10	2,528	14	Region 10 (Bangkok)
1981	14	Pattani	22–28 March	10	2,470	14	Region 10 (Bangkok)
1981	15	Udon Thani	22–28 November	10	2,508	14	Region 10 (Bangkok)
1982	16	Phuket	19–25 December	10	2,779	15	Region 10 (Bangkok)
1984	17	Phitsanulok	22–28 January	10	2,709	15	Region 10 (Bangkok)
1985	18	Chiang Rai	20–26 January	10	2,652	15	Region 10 (Bangkok)
1986	19	Chanthaburi	14–20 February	10	2,804	16	Region 10 (Bangkok)
1987	20	Roi Et	23–29 January	10	2,898	16	Region 10 (Bangkok)
1987	21	Lopburi	18–24 December	10	3,088	18	Region 10 (Bangkok)
1989	22	Songkhla	22–28 March	10	2,943	17	Region 10 (Bangkok)
1990	23	Chiang Mai	4–10 March	10	3,179	19	Region 10 (Bangkok)
1991	24	Phra Nakhon Si Ayutthaya	17–23 March	10	3,185	17	Region 10 (Bangkok)
1992	25	Khon Kaen	12–18 July	10	3,365	20	Region 10 (Bangkok)
1993	26	Surat Thani	24–31 July	10	3,611	20	Region 10 (Bangkok)
1994	27	Suphanburi	19–26 November	10	3,744	21	Region 10 (Bangkok)
1995	28	Surat Thani	16–23 June	10	3,944	21	Region 10 (Bangkok)
1995	29	Trang	19–26 December	10	3,902	21	Region 10 (Bangkok)
1997	30	Sisaket	8–15 December	10	4,172	24	Region 10 (Bangkok)
1998	31	Rayong	6–15 July	10	4,180	26	Region 10 (Bangkok)
2000	32	Bangkok	9–20 December	76	5,664	45	Bangkok
2002	33	Chiang Mai	13–24 December	76	8,940	34	Bangkok
2004	34	Ratchaburi	18–28 December	76	8,212	34	Bangkok
2006	35	Suphanburi (Note: The Cabinet approved the change of the competition from being held every 2 years to once a year.)	9–19 September	76	9,327	33	Bangkok
2007	36	Nakhon Si Thammarat	15–25 September	76	9,991	31	Bangkok
2008	37	Phitsanulok	14–24 December	76	10,882	33	Bangkok
2009	38	Trang	9–19 September	76	12,005	35	Bangkok
2010	39	Chonburi	9–19 December	76	13,614	39	Bangkok
2012	40	Khon Kaen (Note: It was originally scheduled to take place in 2011, but due to a major flood, the competition had to be postponed to 2012)	3–13 March	77	12,561	39	Bangkok
2012	41	Chiang Mai	9–19 December	77	13,748	40	Bangkok
2014	42	Suphanburi	5–15 January	77	14,000	42	Suphanburi
2014	43	Nakhon Ratchasima	9–19 December	77	15,061	44	Suphanburi
2015	44	Nakhon Sawan	12–21 December	77	14,912	43	Suphanburi
2017	45	Songkhla	20–30 June	77	12,593	45	Bangkok
2018	46	Chiang Rai	18–28 November	77	12,847	41	Bangkok
2022	47	Sisaket (Note: The competition was originally scheduled to take place between December 5-15, 2020, but due to the COVID-19 outbreak, it was postponed.)	5–25 June	77	13,225	56	Bangkok
2023	48	Kanchanaburi	Future event				
2024	49	Future event					

=== Gold medal tally ===
Team	Champions	(gold) years
Region 10 (Bangkok)	29 times	−
Region 1 (South Central)	4 times	−
Region 4 (Bangkok and Eastern)	1 time	−
Bangkok	9 times	2000, 2002, 2004, 2007, 2008, 2009, 2010, 2011, 2012, 2017, 2018, 2022
Suphanburi	3 times	2013, 2014, 2015

== See also ==
- Thailand Para National Games - Since TBD
- Thailand Open Masters Games - Since 2020
