= 1969 Thailand Regional Games =

III Thailand Regional Games
- Host city: Songkhla
- Teams: 9
- Athletes: 1,800
- Events: 11 sports
- Opening: 24 November 1969
- Closing: 30 November 1969
- Opened by: Crown Prince Maha Vajiralongkorn
- Main venue: Chira Nakhon Stadium

The 3rd Thailand Regional Games (Thai:กีฬาเขตแห่งประเทศไทย ครั้งที่ 3) also known (1969 National Games, 1969 Interprovincial Games) held in Songkhla, Thailand from 24 to 30 November 1969, with contests 11 sports. These games was the first in Southern of Thailand.

== Marketing ==
=== Emblem ===
The emblem of 1969 Thailand Regional Games was the emblem of Sports Authority of Thailand on purple background.

== The Games ==
=== Participating regions ===
The 3rd Thailand National Games represented 9 regions from 71 provinces.

Region 1 (Bangkok and South of Central)

- Ang Thong
- Bangkok
- Chai Nat
- Lopburi
- Nonthaburi
- Pathum Thani
- Phra Nakhon Si Ayutthaya
- Saraburi
- Singburi

Region 2 (Eastern)

- Chachoengsao
- Chanthaburi
- Chonburi
- Nakhon Nayok
- Prachinburi
- Rayong
- Samut Prakan
- Trat

Region 3 (South of Northeastern)

- Buriram
- Chaiyaphum
- Nakhon Ratchasima
- Sisaket
- Surin
- Ubon Ratchathani

Region 4 (North of Northeastern)

- Kalasin
- Khon Kaen
- Loei
- Maha Sarakham
- Nakhon Phanom
- Nong Khai
- Roi Et
- Sakon Nakhon
- Udon Thani

Region 5 (North of Northern)

- Chiang Mai
- Chiang Rai
- Lampang
- Lamphun
- Mae Hong Son
- Nan
- Phayao
- Phrae

Region 6 (South of Northern)

- Kamphaeng Phet
- Nakhon Sawan
- Phetchabun
- Phichit
- Phitsanulok
- Sukhothai
- Tak
- Uttaradit
- Uthai Thani

Region 7 (Western)

- Kanchanaburi
- Nakhon Pathom
- Phetchaburi
- Prachuap Khiri Khan
- Ratchaburi
- Samut Sakhon
- Samut Songkhram
- Suphanburi

Region 8 (North of Southern)

- Chumphon
- Krabi
- Nakhon Si Thammarat
- Phang Nga
- Phuket
- Ranong
- Surat Thani

Region 9 (South of Southern)

- Narathiwat
- Pattani
- Phatthalung
- Satun
- Songkhla (Host)
- Trang
- Yala

=== Sports ===
The 1st Thailand National Games represented 11 sports.

- Athletics
- Badminton
- Basketball
- Boxing
- Cycling
- Football
- Lawn tennis
- Sepaktakraw
- Shooting
- Table tennis
- Volleyball

=== Gold medal tally ===
1969 Thailand Regional Games Champion

Region 1 (Bangkok and South of Central)
2nd Title

| Preceded by (Chiang Mai province) Chiang Mai | Thailand National Games; Songkhla; III Edition (1969) | Succeeded by (Nakhon Ratchasima province) Nakhon Ratchasima |
