= 1978 Thailand Regional Games =

XII Thailand National Games
- Host city: Ubon Ratchathani (Region3), Thailand
- Teams: 10 Regions (from 72 provinces)
- Athletes: 2,508 athletes
- Events: 14 sports
- Opening: 24 January 1979
- Closing: 30 January 1979
- Main venue: Ubon Ratchathani

The 12th Thailand National Games (Thai: กีฬาเขตแห่งประเทศไทย ครั้งที่ 12, also known as the 1978 National Games and the 1978 Interprovincial Games) were held in Ubon Ratchathani, Thailand from 24 to 30 January 1979, with competitions in 14 sports and athletes from 10 regions. These games were the qualifications for Thai athletes for the 1978 Asian Games.

The 1978 games were postponed by the Udon Thani floods until January 1979.

== Emblem ==
The emblem of 1978 Thailand National Games was a purple circle, with the emblem of Sports Authority of Thailand on the inside, and surrounded by the text

กีฬาเขตแห่งประเทศไทย ครั้งที่ 12 อุบลราชธานี ๒๕๒๑
SAT 11th Thailand Regional Games, Ubon Ratchathani 1978

== Participating regions ==
The 11th Thailand National Games represented 10 regions from 72 provinces. Phayao, formerly part of Chiang Rai, made their debut.

Regions	Provinces	List
1	8	Ang Thong, Chai Nat, Lopburi, Nonthaburi, Pathum Thani, Phra Nakhon Si Ayutthaya, Saraburi, Singburi
2	8	Chachoengsao, Chanthaburi, Chonburi, Nakhon Nayok, Prachinburi, Rayong, Samut Prakan, Trat
3	7	Buriram, Chaiyaphum, Nakhon Ratchasima, Sisaket, Surin, Ubon Ratchathani (host) Yasothon
4	9	Kalasin, Khon Kaen, Loei, Maha Sarakham, Nakhon Phanom, Nong Khai, Roi Et, Sakon Nakhon, Udon Thani
5	8	Chiang Mai, Chiang Rai, Lampang, Lamphun, Mae Hong Son, Nan, Phayao, Phrae
6	9	Kamphaeng Phet, Nakhon Sawan, Phetchabun, Phichit, Phitsanulok, Sukhothai, Tak, Uttaradit, Uthai Thani
7	8	Kanchanaburi, Nakhon Pathom, Phetchaburi, Prachuap Khiri Khan, Ratchaburi, Samut Sakhon, Samut Songkhram, Suphanburi
8	7	Chumphon, Krabi, Nakhon Si Thammarat, Phang Nga, Phuket, Ranong, Surat Thani
9	7	Narathiwat, Pattani, Phatthalung, Satun, Songkhla, Trang, Yala
10	1	Bangkok

== Sports ==
- Athletics
- Badminton
- Basketball
- Boxing
- Cycling
- Football
- Judo
- Lawn tennis
- Sepaktakraw
- Shooting
- Swimming
- Table tennis
- Volleyball
- Weightlifting

Preceded by Bangkok	Thailand National Games; Ubon Ratchathani; XII Edition (1978	Succeeded by Lampang
