= 1970 Thailand Regional Games =

IV Thailand Regional Games
- Host city: Nakhon Ratchasima, Thailand
- Teams: 9
- Athletes: 1,800
- Events: 12 sports
- Opening: 1 November 1970
- Closing: 7 November 1970
- Main venue: Nakhon Ratchasima Central Stadium

The 4th Thailand Regional Games (Thai: กีฬาเขตแห่งประเทศไทย ครั้งที่ 4, also known as the 1970 National Games and the 1970 Interprovincial Games) were held in Nakhon Ratchasima, Thailand from 1 to 7 November 1970, with contests in 12 sports. These games were the qualifications for the 1970 Asian Games. At the medal tally, Thailand was third after Japan and South Korea.

== Marketing ==
=== Emblem ===
The emblem of 1970 Thailand Regional Games was the emblem of Sports Authority of Thailand on an orange background.

== The Games ==
=== Participating regions ===
The 4th Thailand National Games represented 9 regions from 71 provinces.

Region 1 (Bangkok and South of Central)

- Ang Thong
- Bangkok
- Chai Nat
- Lopburi
- Nonthaburi
- Pathum Thani
- Phra Nakhon Si Ayutthaya
- Saraburi
- Singburi

Region 2 (Eastern)

- Chachoengsao
- Chanthaburi
- Chonburi
- Nakhon Nayok
- Prachinburi
- Rayong
- Samut Prakan
- Trat

Region 3 (South of Northeastern)

- Buriram
- Chaiyaphum
- Nakhon Ratchasima (Host)
- Sisaket
- Surin
- Ubon Ratchathani

Region 4 (North of Northeastern)

- Kalasin
- Khon Kaen
- Loei
- Maha Sarakham
- Nakhon Phanom
- Nong Khai
- Roi Et
- Sakon Nakhon
- Udon Thani

Region 5 (North of Northern)

- Chiang Mai
- Chiang Rai
- Lampang
- Lamphun
- Mae Hong Son
- Nan
- Phayao
- Phrae

Region 6 (South of Northern)

- Kamphaeng Phet
- Nakhon Sawan
- Phetchabun
- Phichit
- Phitsanulok
- Sukhothai
- Tak
- Uttaradit
- Uthai Thani

Region 7 (Western)

- Kanchanaburi
- Nakhon Pathom
- Phetchaburi
- Prachuap Khiri Khan
- Ratchaburi
- Samut Sakhon
- Samut Songkhram
- Suphanburi

Region 8 (North of Southern)

- Chumphon
- Krabi
- Nakhon Si Thammarat
- Phang Nga
- Phuket
- Ranong
- Surat Thani

Region 9 (South of Southern)

- Narathiwat
- Pattani
- Phatthalung
- Satun
- Songkhla
- Trang
- Yala

=== Sports ===
The 1st Thailand National Games represented 12 sports.

- Athletics
- Badminton
- Basketball
- Boxing
- Cycling
- Football
- Judo
- Lawn tennis
- Sepaktakraw
- Table tennis
- Volleyball
- Weightlifting

=== Gold medal tally ===
1970 Thailand Regional Games Champion

Region 1 (Bangkok and South of Central)
3rd Title

Preceded by (Songkhla province) Songkhla	Thailand National Games; Nakhon Ratchasima; IV Edition (1970)	Succeeded by (Nakhon Sawan province) Nakhon Sawan
