= 1979 Thailand Regional Games =

XIII Thailand National Games
- Host city: Lampang (Region 5), Thailand
- Teams: 10 Regions (from 72 provinces)
- Athletes: 2,528 athletes
- Events: 14 sports
- Opening: 23 December 1979
- Closing: 29 December 1979
- Opened by: Governor Sawai Sirimongkhon
- Main venue: Lampang

The 13th Thailand National Games (Thai: กีฬาเขตแห่งประเทศไทย ครั้งที่ 13, also known as the 1979 National Games and the 1979 Inter-Provincial Games) were held in Lampang, Thailand from 23 to 29 December 1979, with competition in 14 sports and athletes from 10 regions. These games were the qualification for Thai athletes in the 1978 Asian Games.

== Emblem ==
The emblem of 1979 Thailand National Games was a brown circle, with the emblem of Sports Authority of Thailand on the inside, surrounded by the text

กีฬาเขตแห่งประเทศไทย ครั้งที่ ๑๓ ลำปาง ๒๕๒๒
13th Thailand Regional Games, Lampang 1979

== Participating regions ==
The 13th Thailand National Games represented 10 regions from 72 provinces. Phayao, formerly part of Chiang Rai, made its debut.

Regions	Provinces	List
1	8	Ang Thong, Chai Nat, Lopburi, Nonthaburi, Pathum Thani, Phra Nakhon Si Ayutthaya, Saraburi, Singburi
2	8	Chachoengsao, Chanthaburi, Chonburi, Nakhon Nayok, Prachinburi, Rayong, Samut Prakan, Trat
3	7	Buriram, Chaiyaphum, Nakhon Ratchasima, Sisaket, Surin, Ubon Ratchathani Yasothon
4	9	Kalasin, Khon Kaen, Loei, Maha Sarakham, Nakhon Phanom, Nong Khai, Roi Et, Sakon Nakhon, Udon Thani
5	8	Chiang Mai, Chiang Rai, Lampang (Host), Lamphun, Mae Hong Son, Nan, Phayao, Phrae
6	9	Kamphaeng Phet, Nakhon Sawan, Phetchabun, Phichit, Phitsanulok, Sukhothai, Tak, Uttaradit, Uthai Thani
7	8	Kanchanaburi, Nakhon Pathom, Phetchaburi, Prachuap Khiri Khan, Ratchaburi, Samut Sakhon, Samut Songkhram, Suphanburi
8	7	Chumphon, Krabi, Nakhon Si Thammarat, Phang Nga, Phuket, Ranong, Surat Thani
9	7	Narathiwat, Pattani, Phatthalung, Satun, Songkhla, Trang, Yala
10	1	Bangkok

== Sports ==
- Athletics
- Badminton
- Basketball
- Boxing
- Cycling
- Football
- Judo
- Lawn tennis
- Sepaktakraw
- Shooting
- Swimming
- Table tennis
- Volleyball
- Weightlifting

Preceded by Ubon Ratchathani	Thailand National Games; Lampang; XIII Edition (1979	Succeeded by Pattani
