= 1968 Thailand National Games =

II Thailand Regional Games
- Host city: Chiang Mai
- Teams: 71 (from 9 regions)
- Athletes: 1,700
- Events: 118 in 14 sports
- Opening: 3 December 1968
- Closing: 9 December 1968
- Opened by: Prime minister Thanom Kittikachorn
- Athlete's Oath: Khun Sermsurasak
- Torch lighter: Charoen Wattanasin
- Main venue: Chiang Mai Municipality Stadium

The 1968 Thailand National Games, officially known as the II Thailand National Games (Thai: กีฬาเขตแห่งประเทศไทย ครั้งที่ 2), and commonly known as Chiang Mai 1968, was a multi-sport event held in Chiang Mai, Thailand, from 3 to 9 December 1968 with 118 events in 14 sports and disciplines featured in the games . This was Chiang Mai's first time to host the Thailand National Games. A total of 1,700 athletes from 9 regions participated in the games.

The final medal tally was led by Region 1, followed by Region 7 and Region 6.

== Marketing ==
=== Emblem ===
The emblem of 1968 Thailand Regional Games was the emblem of Sports Authority of Thailand or SAT and under the logo by the text

การแข่งขันกีฬาเขต ครั้งที่ ๒
เชียงใหม่ ๒๕๑๑

2nd Thailand Regional Games
Chiang Mai 1967

== The Games ==
=== Participating regions ===
The 2nd Thailand National Games represented 9 regions from 71 provinces.

Region 1 (Bangkok and South of Central)

- Ang Thong
- Bangkok
- Chai Nat
- Lopburi
- Nonthaburi
- Pathum Thani
- Phra Nakhon Si Ayutthaya
- Saraburi
- Singburi

Region 2 (Eastern)

- Chachoengsao
- Chanthaburi
- Chonburi
- Nakhon Nayok
- Prachinburi
- Rayong
- Samut Prakan
- Trat

Region 3 (South of Northeastern)

- Buriram
- Chaiyaphum
- Nakhon Ratchasima
- Sisaket
- Surin
- Ubon Ratchathani

Region 4 (North of Northeastern)

- Kalasin
- Khon Kaen
- Loei
- Maha Sarakham
- Nakhon Phanom
- Nong Khai
- Roi Et
- Sakon Nakhon
- Udon Thani

Region 5 (North of Northern)

- Chiang Mai (Host)
- Chiang Rai
- Lampang
- Lamphun
- Mae Hong Son
- Nan
- Phayao
- Phrae

Region 6 (South of Northern)

- Kamphaeng Phet
- Nakhon Sawan
- Phetchabun
- Phichit
- Phitsanulok
- Sukhothai
- Tak
- Uttaradit
- Uthai Thani

Region 7 (Western)

- Kanchanaburi
- Nakhon Pathom
- Phetchaburi
- Prachuap Khiri Khan
- Ratchaburi
- Samut Sakhon
- Samut Songkhram
- Suphanburi

Region 8 (North of Southern)

- Chumphon
- Krabi
- Nakhon Si Thammarat
- Phang Nga
- Phuket
- Ranong
- Surat Thani

Region 9 (South of Southern)

- Narathiwat
- Pattani
- Phatthalung
- Satun
- Songkhla
- Trang
- Yala

=== Sports ===
The 1st Thailand National Games represented 15 sports.

- Athletics
- Badminton
- Basketball
- Boxing
- Cycling
- Football
- Judo
- Lawn tennis
- Sepaktakraw
- Shooting
- Swimming
- Table tennis
- Tennis
- Volleyball
- Weightlifting

=== Gold medal tally ===
1968 Thailand Regional Games Champion

Region 1 (Bangkok and South of Central)
1st Title

Preceded by Bangkok	Thailand National Games; Chiang Mai; II Edition (1969)	Succeeded by Songkhla
