= 2013 Thailand National Games =

Multi-sport event in Thailand

XLII Thailand National Games
- Host city: Suphan Buri
- Teams: 77
- Events: 44 sports
- Opening: 5 January 2014
- Closing: 15 January 2014
- Opened by: Yukol Limlamthong, Deputy prime minister
- Torch lighter: Neeranuch Klomdee
- Main venue: Suphan Buri Provincial Stadium

The 42nd Thailand National Games (Thai: การแข่งขันกีฬาแห่งชาติ ครั้งที่ 42 "สุพรรณบุรีเกมส์", also known as the 2013 National Games and the Suphan Buri Games) were held in Suphan Buri, Thailand from 5 to 15 January 2014, involving 44 sports and 77 disciplines. These games were held in Suphan Buri Provincial Sport Center and Suphan Buri Sport School Stadium. Nakhon Ratchasima also hosted the 1994 and the 2006 Thailand National Games.

== Marketing ==
=== Emblem ===
His Majesty King Naresuan riding on his royal war elephant beat His Majesty King of Burma with Don Chedi Memorial.

=== Mascot ===
The mascots Ma Si Mok. The dark gray horse in Khun Chang Khun Phaen.

== Ceremony ==
=== Opening ceremony ===
The opening ceremony was held on January 5, 2014 at Suphan Buri Provincial Stadium with performances from the Suphanburi Symphonic Band and a special football match between Suphanburi FC and Muang Thong United.

=== Closing ceremony ===
The closing ceremony was held on January 15, 2014 at Suphan Buri Provincial Stadium with a handover of the flag to Nakhon Ratchasima, the host 2014 Thailand National Games.

== Provinces participating ==
- Amnat Charoen
- Ang Thong
- Bangkok
- Bueng Kan
- Buriram
- Chachoengsao
- Chai Nat
- Chaiyaphum
- Chanthaburi
- Chiang Mai
- Chiang Rai
- Chonburi
- Chumphon
- Kalasin
- Kamphaeng Phet
- Kanchanaburi
- Khon Kaen
- Krabi
- Lampang
- Lamphun
- Loei
- Lopburi
- Mae Hong Son
- Maha Sarakham
- Mukdahan
- Nakhon Nayok
- Nakhon Pathom
- Nakhon Phanom
- Nakhon Ratchasima
- Nakhon Sawan
- Nakhon Si Thammarat
- Nan
- Narathiwat
- Nong Bua Lamphu
- Nong Khai
- Nonthaburi
- Pathum Thani
- Pattani
- Phang Nga
- Phatthalung
- Phayao
- Phetchabun
- Phetchaburi
- Phichit
- Phitsanulok
- Phra Nakhon Si Ayutthaya
- Phrae
- Phuket
- Prachinburi
- Prachuap Khiri Khan
- Ranong
- Ratchaburi
- Rayong
- Roi Et
- Sa Kaeo
- Sakon Nakhon
- Samut Prakan
- Samut Sakhon
- Samut Songkhram
- Saraburi
- Satun
- Sing Buri
- Sisaket
- Songkhla
- Sukhothai
- Suphan Buri (Host)
- Surat Thani
- Surin
- Tak
- Trang
- Trat
- Ubon Ratchathani
- Udon Thani
- Uthai Thani
- Uttaradit
- Yala
- Yasothon

== Sports ==
- Air sports
- Archery
- Athletics
- Badminton
- Basketball
- Baseball
- Billiards and snooker
- Bodybuilding
- Bridge
- Boxing
- Cricket
- Cycling
- Dancesport
- Extreme sports
- Equestrian
- Field hockey
- Football
- Futsal
- Gymnastics
- Go
- Golf
- Handball
- Judo
- Kabaddi
- Karate
- Muay Thai
- Netball
- Petanque
- Pencak silat
- Rugby football
- Rowing
- Sepak takraw
- Shooting
- Softball
- Soft tennis
- Swimming
- Table tennis
- Taekwondo
- Tennis
- Volleyball
- Weightlifting
- Woodball
- Wrestling
- Wushu

== Medal tally ==
* Host nation (Suphan Buri)

2013 Thailand National Games medal table
Rank	Province	Gold	Silver	Bronze	Total
1	Suphan Buri*	198	80	80	358
2	Bangkok	74	99	102	275
3	Chonburi	47	45	46	138
4	Nakhon Ratchasima	23	32	25	80
5	Nonthaburi	21	25	32	78
6	Chiang Mai province	19	22	33	74
7	Samut Sakhon	17	16	14	47
8	Nakhon Si Thammarat	17	15	18	50
9	Sisaket	12	11	16	39
10	Samut Prakan	9	6	19	34
Totals (10 entries)		437	351	385	1,173

Preceded by 2012 Thailand National Games; Chiang Mai	Thailand National Games; Suphan Buri (2013)	Succeeded by 2014 Thailand National Games; Nakhon Ratchasima
