= 2010 Thailand National Games =

Multi-sport event in Thailand

XXXIX Thailand National Games
- Host city: Chonburi, Thailand
- Teams: 76
- Events: 39 sports
- Opening: 9 December 2010
- Closing: 19 December 2010
- Opened by: Chumpol Silpa-archa, Minister of Tourism and Sports
- Torch lighter: Amnat Ruenroeng
- Main venue: Institute of Physical Education Chonburi Campus Stadium

The 39th Thailand National Games (Thai: การแข่งขันกีฬาแห่งชาติ ครั้งที่ 39 "ชลบุรีเกมส์", also known as the 2010 National Games and the Chonburi Games) were held in Chonburi, Thailand from 5 to 19 December 2010, with competition in 39 sports and 76 disciplines. These games were held in the Institute of Physical Education Chonburi Campus Sport Center.

== Marketing ==
=== Emblem ===
The sailing surfing with Thai flag and TH 27.

=== Mascot ===
The mascots were Saen Suk and Saen Samran.

== Ceremony ==
=== Opening ceremony ===
The opening ceremony of the 39th Thailand National Games were held on December 9, 2013, at Institute of Physical Education Chonburi Campus Stadium.

=== Closing ceremony ===
The closing ceremony of the 39th Thailand National Games were held on December 19, 2013, at Institute of Physical Education Chonburi Campus Stadium.

== Provinces participating ==
- Amnat Charoen
- Ang Thong
- Bangkok
- Buriram
- Chachoengsao
- Chainat
- Chaiyaphum
- Chanthaburi
- Chiang Mai
- Chiang Rai
- Chonburi (host)
- Chumphon
- Kalasin
- Kamphaeng Phet
- Kanchanaburi
- Khon Kaen
- Krabi
- Lampang
- Lamphun
- Loei
- Mae Hong Son
- Maha Sarakham
- Mukdahan
- Nakhon Nayok
- Nakhon Pathom
- Nakhon Phanom
- Nakhon Ratchasima
- Nakhon Sawan
- Nakhon Si Thammarat
- Nan
- Narathiwat
- Nong Bua Lamphu
- Nong Khai
- Nonthaburi
- Pattani
- Phang Nga
- Phattalung
- Phayao
- Phetchaburi
- Phichit
- Phitsanulok
- Phra Nakhon Si Ayutthaya
- Phrae
- Phuket
- Prachinburi
- Prachuap Khiri Khan
- Ranong
- Ratchaburi
- Rayong
- Roi Et
- Sakon Nakhon
- Samut Prakan
- Samut Sakhon
- Samut Songkhram
- Saraburi
- Satun
- Sing Buri
- Sisaket
- Songkhla
- Sukhothai
- Suphanburi
- Surat Thani
- Surin
- Tak
- Trang
- Trat
- Ubon Ratchathani
- Udon Thani
- Uthaithani
- Uttaradit
- Yala
- Yasothon

== Sports ==
- Air sports
- Athletics
- Badminton
- Basketball
- Billiards and snooker
- Bodybuilding
- Bowling
- Bridge
- Boxing
- Cycling
- Dancesport
- Fencing
- Field hockey
- Football
- Futsal
- Gymnastics
- Go
- Golf
- Handball
- Judo
- Kabaddi
- Karate
- Lawn tennis
- Muay Thai
- Netball
- Petanque
- Pencak silat
- Rowing
- Sailing
- Sepak takraw
- Shooting
- Softball
- Soft tennis
- Swimming
- Table tennis
- Taekwondo
- Volleyball
- Weightlifting
- Windsurfing
- Wrestling
- Wushu

=== Demonstration sports ===
- Woodball

== Medal tally ==
* Host nation (Host)

Rank	Nation	Gold	Silver	Bronze	Total
1	Bangkok	112	106	119	337
2	Chonburi	83	72	73	228
3	Suphanburi	67	38	43	148
4	Trang*	22	11	21	54
5	Nonthaburi	21	16	25	62
Totals (5 entries)		305	243	281	829

Preceded by 2009 Thailand National Games; Trang	Thailand National Games; Chonburi (2010)	Succeeded by 2011 Thailand National Games; Khon Kaen
