= 1967 Thailand National Games =

I Thailand National Games
- Host city: Bangkok (Phra Nakhon)
- Teams: 5
- Events: 103 in 15 sports
- Opening: 1 November 1967
- Closing: 5 November 1967
- Opened by: King Bhumibol Adulyadej
- Athlete's Oath: Sutthi Manyakas
- Torch lighter: Preeda Chullamondhol; Cycling
- Main venue: National Stadium

The 1967 Thailand National Games, officially known as the I Thailand National Games (Thai: กีฬาเขตแห่งประเทศไทย ครั้งที่ 1), and commonly known as Phra Nakhon 1967, was a multi-sport event held in Bangkok (Phra Nakhon), Thailand, from 1 to 5 November 1967 with 103 events in 15 sports and disciplines featured in the games . This was Bangkok's first time to host the Thailand National Games. A total of 716 athletes from 5 regions participated in the games.

The final medal tally was led by host Region 4, followed by Region 1 and Region 3.

== Organisation ==
=== Host city ===
Bangkok or Phra Nakhon as the host of the 1967 Thailand National Games

This is the first edition of Thailand National Games. It was the first time the capital city in Thailand, Bangkok or Phra Nakhon held the national sporting event.

=== Development and preparation ===
The Bangkok Thailand National Games Organising Committee, led by Chairman Luang Chattrakarn Kosol, chairman of the board Praphas Charusathien of the Sports Authority of Thailand and Director Kong Visuttharom Sports Authority of Thailand.

=== Venues ===
- National Stadium – Ceremony, Athletics, Cycling (track) and Football
- Gymnasium 1 – Badminton, Basketball, Judo and Weightlifting
- Kittikachorn Stadium – Boxing
- Mittraphap Road – Cycling (road)
- Silom Club Tennis Court – Lawn tennis
- Hockey Stadium – Rugby football
- Gymnasium 2 – Sepak Takraw and Volleyball
- Huamark Shooting Range – Shooting
- Olympic Swimming Pool – Swimming
- Thammasat University Gymnasium – Table tennis

== Marketing ==
=== Emblem ===
The emblem of 1967 Thailand Regional Games was the emblem of Sports Authority of Thailand or SAT and under the logo by the text

การแข่งขันกีฬาเขต ครั้งที่ 1
1-8 พฤศจิกายน 2510

I Thailand Regional Games
1-8 November 1967

== The Games ==
=== Opening ceremony ===
The opening ceremony was held on Wednesday, 1 November 1967, beginning at 16:00 ICT (UTC+7) at the National Stadium. The ceremony began with Prime minister Thanom Kittikachorn entered the stadium. Later, a parade of athletes from the regions of Thailand with host Bangkok (Phra Nakhon) enters the stadium last. After Sports Authority of Thailand chairman of the board Praphas Charusathien gave their respective speech. After Thanom Kittikachorn declared the games opened, Preeda Chullamondhol was lit the cauldron. Later Sutthi Manyakas took an oath. The ceremony ended with the men's football competitions between Region 3 and Region 2.

=== Closing ceremony ===
The opening ceremony was held on Sunday, 1 November 1967, beginning at 17:00 ICT (UTC+7) at the National Stadium. The ceremony began with Prime minister Thanom Kittikachorn entered the stadium. Later, the men's football gold medal match. After the victory ceremony, Thanom Kittikachorn declared the games closed. The ceremony ended with the cauldron extinguished.

=== Participating regions ===
An estimated total of 716 athletes from 5 regions competed at the 1967 Thailand Regional Games.

Region 1 (Northern)

- Chiang Mai
- Chiang Rai
- Kamphaeng Phet
- Lampang
- Lamphun
- Mae Hong Son
- Nan
- Phrae
- Phichit
- Phitsanulok
- Sukhothai
- Tak
- Uttaradit

Region 2 (Northeastern)

- Buriram
- Chaiyaphum
- Kalasin
- Khon Kaen
- Loei
- Maha Sarakham
- Nakhon Phanom
- Nakhon Ratchasima
- Nong Khai
- Roi Et
- Sakon Nakhon
- Sisaket
- Surin
- Ubon Ratchathani
- Udon Thani

Region 3 (Northern Central)

- Ang Thong
- Chai Nat
- Lopburi
- Nakhon Sawan
- Phetchabun
- Phra Nakhon Si Ayutthaya
- Uthai Thani
- Saraburi
- Singburi

Region 4 (Southern Central and Eastern)

- Bangkok (Host)
- Chachoengsao
- Chanthaburi
- Chonburi
- Kanchanaburi
- Nakhon Nayok
- Nakhon Pathom
- Nonthaburi
- Pathum Thani
- Phetchaburi
- Prachinburi
- Prachuap Khiri Khan
- Ratchaburi
- Rayong
- Samut Prakan
- Samut Sakhon
- Samut Songkhram
- Suphan Buri
- Thonburi
- Trat

Region 5 (Southern)

- Chumphon
- Krabi
- Nakhon Si Thammarat
- Narathiwat
- Pattani
- Phang Nga
- Phatthalung
- Phuket
- Ranong
- Satun
- Songkhla
- Surat Thani
- Trang
- Yala province

=== Sports ===
The 1967 Games programme featured 103 events in the following 15 sports:

- Aquatics
  - Diving
  - Swimming
  - Water polo
- Athletics
- Badminton
- Basketball
- Boxing
- Cycling
  - Road
  - Track
- Football
- Judo
- Lawn tennis
- Rugby football
- Sepak takraw
- Shooting
- Table tennis
- Volleyball
- Weightlifting

==== Withdrawn events ====
- Sailing

=== Calendar ===
OC	Opening ceremony	●	Event competitions	●	Gold medals	CC	Closing ceremony

November 1967	1 Wed	2 Thu	3 Fri	4 Sat	5 Sun	Venue
Ceremonies	OC				CC	National Stadium
Aquatics				●		Olympic Swimming Pool
Athletics		●	●			National Stadium
Badminton		●	●	●		Gymnasium 1
Boxing		●		●		Kittikachorn Stadium
Cycling		●	●	●	●	National Stadium; Mittraphap Road
Football	●	●	●	●	●	National Stadium
Judo		●				Gymnasium 1
Lawn tennis		●	●	●		Silom Club Tennis Court
Rugby football				●		Hockey Stadium
Sepak takraw		●	●			Gymnasium 2
Shooting		●	●	●		Huamark Shooting Range
Table tennis				●		Thammasat University Gymnasium
Volleyball				●	●	Gymnasium 2
Weightlifting			●			Gymnasium 1
November 1967	1 Wed	2 Thu	3 Fri	4 Sat	5 Sun	Venue

=== Medal table ===
A total of 298 medals comprising 103 gold medals, 105 silver medals and 90 bronze medals were awarded to athletes. The host Region 4's performance were placed top on the medal table.

* Host nation (Region 4)

Rank	Region	Gold	Silver	Bronze	Total
1	Region 4*	64	39	22	125
2	Region 1	18	19	21	58
3	Region 3	14	33	28	75
4	Region 5	6	9	9	24
5	Region 2	1	5	10	16
Totals (5 entries)		103	105	90	298

== See also ==
Other Thailand National Games celebrated in Bangkok

- 1977 Thailand National Games
- 2000 Thailand National Games

Preceded by No Competition	Thailand National Games; Bangkok; I Edition (1967)	Succeeded by Chiang Mai
