= 1971 Thailand Regional Games =

V Thailand National Games
- Host city: Nakhon Sawan (Region 6), Thailand
- Teams: 9 regions (from 70 provinces)
- Athletes: 1,901 athletes
- Events: 13 sports
- Opening: 2 December 1971
- Closing: 9 December 1971
- Main venue: Nakhon Sawan

The 5th Thailand National Games (Thai: กีฬาเขตแห่งประเทศไทย ครั้งที่ 5, also known as the 1971 National Games and 1971 Interprovincial Games) were held in Nakhon Sawan, Thailand from 2 to 9 December 1971, with contests in 13 sports. These games were the qualifications of Thai athletes for the 1971 Southeast Asian Peninsular Games held in Kualalumpur, Malaysia.

== Participating regions ==
The 5th Thailand National Games represented 9 regions from 70 provinces.

Regions	Provinces	List
1	9	Ang Thong Bangkok Chai Nat Lopburi Nonthaburi Pathum Thani Phra Nakhon Si Ayutthaya Saraburi Sing Buri
2	8	Chachoengsao Chanthaburi Chonburi Nakhon Nayok Phrachinburi Rayong Samut Prakan Trat
3	6	Buriram Chaiyaphum Nakhon Ratchasima Sisaket Surin Ubon Ratchathani
4	9	Kalasin Khon Kaen Loei Maha Sarakham Nakhon Phanom Nong Khai Roi Et Sakon Nakhon Udon Thani
5	8	Chiang Mai Chiang Rai Lampang Lamphun Mae Hong Son Nan Phayao Phrae
6	9	Kamphaeng Phet Nakhon Sawan (Host) Phetchabun Phichit Phitsanulok Sukhothai Tak Uttaradit Uthai Thani
7	8	Kanchanaburi Nakhon Pathom Phetchaburi Prachuap Khiri Khan Ratchaburi Samut Sakhon Samut Songkhram Suphan Buri
8	7	Chumphon Krabi Nakhon Si Thammarat Phang Nga Phuket Ranong Surat Thani
9	7	Narathiwat Pattani Phatthalung Satun Songkhla Trang Yala

== Sports ==
The 1971 Thailand National Games featured 10 Olympic sports contested at the 1971 Southeast Asian Peninsular Games, 1974 Asian Games and 1972 Summer Olympics. In addition, four non-Olympic sports were featured: badminton, sepak takraw, table tennis and tennis.

- Athletics
- Badminton
- Basketball
- Boxing
- Cycling
- Football
- Judo
- Sepak takraw
- Shooting
- Table tennis
- Tennis
- Volleyball
- Weightlifting

== See also ==
- 1990 Thailand National Student Games
- 1993 Thailand National Para Games
- 1995 Thailand National Games
- 1996 Thailand National Para Games
- 1999 Thailand National Student Games
- 2010 Thailand Sport School Games by Nakhon Sawan Sport School
- 2015 Thailand National Games
- 2015 Thailand National Para Games

Preceded by (Nakhon Ratchasima province) Nakhon Ratchasima	Thailand National Games; Nakhon Sawan; V Edition (1971)	Succeeded by (Ratchaburi province) Ratchaburi
