= 2015 Thailand National Games =

XLIV Thailand National Games
- Host city: Nakhon Sawan, Thailand
- Motto: มิตรภาพยิ่งใหญ่กว่าชัยชนะ Friendship greater than victory
- Teams: 77
- Events: 43 sports
- Opening: 12 December 2015
- Closing: 21 December 2015
- Opened by: Kobkarn Wattanavrangkul, Minister of Tourism and Sports
- Athlete's Oath: Usanee Wongsalangkarn
- Judge's Oath: Thamrong Thipsiri
- Torch lighter: Prapawadee Jaroenrattanatarakoon
- Main venue: Nakhon Sawan Province Central Stadium

The 44th Thailand National Games (Thai: การแข่งขันกีฬาแห่งชาติ ครั้งที่ 44 "นครสวรรค์เกมส์", also known as the 2015 National Games and the Nakhon Sawan Games) were held in Nakhon Sawan, Thailand from 12 to 21 December 2015. The opening ceremony, scheduled for 11 December, was postponed by Bike for Dad ปั่นเพื่อพ่อ, to 12 December. There were matches in 43 sports and 77 disciplines. The games were held in Nakhon Sawan Sport Center and Nakhon Sawan sport school. Nakhon Sawan also hosted the 28th national games in 1995.

== Marketing ==
=== Emblem ===
The red curve is for powerful success, the blue curve for the strength of the sport, the red circle is for knowledge of the sport, and the golden circle frame is a victory medal of competition. The emblem also has the face of a Yingge dancer.

=== Mascot ===
The mascot is a dragon named Xiao Long (Dragon, 小龙), xiaolong meaning dragon. The Chinese dragon has been long regarded as the creator of humanitarian law, building confidence, showing power and goodness, mettle, heroic effort and perseverance, morality, nobility, and mightiness like a god. The Chinese dragon does not give up until they accomplish what they want; other attributes are conscientious, absolute discretion, optimistic, ambitious, beautiful, friendly and intelligent.

== Torch relay ==
At the grand palace, General Surayud Chulanont gave the royal flame to Assistant Minister of Tourism and Sports and Nakhon Sawan and the National games and National Para Games Organizing Committee. The route of torch relay was around Nakhon Sawan Province.

== Provinces participating ==
- Amnat Charoen
- Ang Thong
- Bangkok
- Bueng Kan
- Buriram
- Chachoengsao
- Chai Nat
- Chaiyaphum
- Chanthaburi
- Chiang Mai
- Chiang Rai
- Chonburi
- Chumphon
- Kalasin
- Kamphaeng Phet
- Kanchanaburi
- Khon Kaen
- Krabi
- Lampang
- Lamphun
- Loei
- Lopburi
- Mae Hong Son
- Maha Sarakham
- Mukdahan
- Nakhon Nayok
- Nakhon Pathom
- Nakhon Phanom
- Nakhon Ratchasima
- Nakhon Sawan
- Nakhon Si Thammarat
- Nan
- Narathiwat
- Nong Bua Lamphu
- Nong Khai
- Nonthaburi
- Pathum Thani
- Pattani
- Phang Nga
- Phatthalung
- Phayao
- Phetchabun
- Phetchaburi
- Phichit
- Phitsanulok
- Phra Nakhon Si Ayutthaya
- Phrae
- Phuket
- Prachinburi
- Prachuap Khiri Khan
- Ranong
- Ratchaburi
- Rayong
- Roi Et
- Sa Kaeo
- Sakon Nakhon
- Samut Prakan
- Samut Sakhon
- Samut Songkhram
- Saraburi
- Satun
- Sing Buri
- Sisaket
- Songkhla
- Sukhothai
- Suphan Buri
- Surat Thani
- Surin
- Tak
- Trang
- Trat
- Ubon Ratchathani
- Udon Thani
- Uthai Thani
- Uttaradit
- Yala
- Yasothon

== Sports ==
=== Official sports ===
- Air sports
- Archery
- Athletics
- Badminton
- Basketball
- Billiards and snooker
- Bodybuilding
- Bowling
- Boxing
- Canoeing
  - Sprint
  - Slalom
- Cycling
  - BMX
  - Mountain biking
  - Road
  - Track
- Dancesport
- Extreme sports
  - BMX
  - Inline skate
  - Skateboard
  - Slalom
- Fencing
- Field hockey
- Football
- Futsal
- Gymnastics
  - Artistic
  - Rhythmic
  - Trampoline
- Go
- Golf
- Handball
- Judo
- Kabaddi
- Karate
- Muay Thai
- Netball
- Petanque
- Pencak silat
- Rowing
- Rugby football
- Sepak takraw
  - Beach sepak takraw
  - Sepak takraw (Circle)
  - Sepak takraw
- Shooting
- Softball
- Soft tennis
- Swimming
- Table tennis
- Taekwondo
  - Poomsae
  - Kyorugi
- Tennis
- Thai fencing
- Traditional boat
- Tug of war
- Volleyball
  - Beach volleyball
  - Volleyball
- Weightlifting
- Woodball
- Wrestling
  - Freestyle
  - Greco-Roman

=== Demonstration sports ===
- Makruk

== Venues ==
Venues	Sports
Nakhon Sawan Province Central Stadium	Ceremony, Athletics
Wang Meung Subdistrict Administrative Organization, (Lat Yao District)	Air sports
Golf Course (Chiraprawat)	Golf
Nakhon Sawan Vocational College Gymnasium	Kabaddi
Satri Nakhon Sawan school hall	Karate
Nakhon Sawan Bypass Road	Cycling (road)
Kao Rang Stadium, Nong Pling Subdistrict Administrative Organization	Cycling (downhill and cross-country)
Suankularbchiraprawat School	Cycling (track)
Nakhon Sawan Sport School Gymnasium	Sepak takraw
60 years Memorial Building (The University of Central Thailand)	Sepak takraw (circle)
Nakhon Sawan Sport School Field	Sepak takraw (beach), Netball, Archery
Tennis Court, Nakhon Sawan Provincial Administrative Organization	Soft tennis
Bungboraped Seminars Building	Taekwondo, Dancesport
Tennis Court, Nakhon Sawan Sport Center	Tennis
Nakhon Sawan Gymnasium(600 seats), Nakhon Sawan Sport Center	Tennis
Nakhon Sawan Gymnasium(4,000 seats), Nakhon Sawan Sport Center	Basketball
Nakhon Sawan Badminton Gymnasium, Nakhon Sawan Sport Center	Badminton
Anuban-Nakhon Sawan school hall	Pencak silat
Extreme sport Field, Sawan Park	Extreme sport
Petanque Field, Sawan Park	Petanque
Nakhon Sawan Sport School Football Stadium	Football (male/female)
Nakhon Sawan Sport School Futsal Arena	Futsal (male/female)

Venues	Sports
Nakhon Sawan Rajabhat University Hall	Thai fencing, Fencing
Provincial Police Training Center Stadium, Region 6	Muay Thai, Gymnastics, Shooting
Wiriyaporn University Memorial Auditorium (Chaopraya University)	Wrestling, Judo
Nakhon Sawan Sport School Boxing Arena	Boxing
Nakhon Sawan Sport Center Hall	Weightlifting
Bungboraped Football Stadium	Rugby football (7 people/15 people)
Bungboraped	Canoeing (Sprint and Slalom), Rowing, Traditional boat
Suankularbchiraprawat School Gymnasium	Volleyball (indoor)
Navamindarajudit Matchim School Gymnasium	Volleyball (beach)
Nakhon Sawan Aquatic Center	Swimming
V-Square Plaza Bowling Club	Bowling
Woodball Court, Sawan Park	Woodball
Nakhon Sawan Vocational College Auditorium	Billiards and snooker
The University of Central Thailand	Go
Sawan Rajabhat University Gymnasium	Field hockey (indoor)
Sawan Rajabhat University Football Stadium	Field hockey (outdoor)
Sawan Park	Handball
Nakhon Sawan School Futsal Arena	Tug of war
Chiraprawat Military Camp Hospital Football Stadium	Softball (male)
Suankularb Chiraprawat School Football Stadium	Softball (female)
Sawan Park	Bodybuilding.
Nakhon Sawan Rajabhat University	Makruk (Demonstration sport).

- Note:Chai Nat Province is the venue for Cycling (BMX)

== Ceremony ==
=== Opening ceremony ===
The opening ceremony started at 18:00 local time on December 12, 2015, at the Nakhon Sawan Province Central Stadium. It was attended by Minister of Tourism and Sports, Kobkarn Wattanavrangkul. This ceremony presented 4 shows including:

- The first show: River of Life; Nakhon Sawan has four rivers: Ping River, Wang River, Yom River and Nan River and stream converge into Chao Phraya River at Pak Nam Pho.
- The second show: Lod Lai Mangkorn (Dragon), Culture of Thai Chinese in Nakhon Sawan.
- The third show: Honor the King, Loyalty of Thai people to the King.
- The fourth show: Celebrating 100 years of Nakhon Sawan.

=== Closing ceremony ===
The closing ceremony started at 18:00 local time on December 12, 2015, at the Nakhon Sawan Province Central Stadium. It was attended by Assistant Minister of Tourism and Sports, Chawani Thongroj. This ceremony presented 4 shows and handover of the Thai National Games flag to the Governor of the Sports Authority of Thailand, Sakol Wannapong.

== Medal tally ==
Suphanburi led the medal table for the third consecutive time. A total of 77 provinces won at least one medal, 67 provinces won at least one gold medal, 8 provinces won at least one silver medal and 2 provinces won at least one bronze medal.

* Host nation (Nakhon Sawan)

2015 Thailand National Games medal table
Rank	Province	Gold	Silver	Bronze	Total
1	Suphan Buri	104	79	84	267
2	Bangkok	88	88	103	279
3	Nakhon Sawan*	40	26	23	89
4	Chonburi	38	36	38	112
5	Nakhon Ratchasima	28	37	46	111
6	Udon Thani	27	9	16	52
7	Samut Sakhon	23	13	20	56
8	Samut Prakan	17	19	18	54
9	Nonthaburi	16	25	24	65
10	Nakhon Si Thammarat	15	14	23	52
11	Sisaket	12	11	21	44
12	Saraburi	11	21	10	42
Totals (12 entries)		419	378	426	1,223

Preceded by (Nakhon Ratchasima province) Nakhon Ratchasima	Thailand National Games; Nakhon Sawan; XLIV Edition (2015)	Succeeded by (Songkhla province) Songkhla
