= 2012 Thailand National Games =

Multi-sport event in Thailand

XLI Thailand National Games
- Host city: Chiang Mai, Thailand
- Teams: 77
- Events: 43 sports
- Opening: 9 December 2012
- Closing: 19 December 2012
- Opened by: Chumpol Silpa-archa, Deputy Prime Minister
- Torch lighter: Nuttapong Ketin and Tony Jaa
- Main venue: 700th Anniversary Stadium

The 41st Thailand National Games (Thai:การแข่งขันกีฬาแห่งชาติ ครั้งที่ 41 "เชียงใหม่เกมส์") also known (2012 National Games, Chiang Mai Games) were held in Chiang Mai, Thailand from 5 to 19 December 2013. Represented were 43 sports and 77 disciplines. The games were held in 700th Anniversary Stadium Sport Center, etc. and Chiang Mai hosted 1995 Southeast Asian Games.

== Marketing ==
=== Emblem ===
- Wat Phra That Doi Suthep – The holy place in Chaing Mai.
- The elephant – The animal in Chiang Mai seal.
- The circle – power development success.
- The human hand up – Chiang Mai citizen glad to the host of this games.
- Deep blue – The color of Chiang Mai.
- Gold – Prosperity
- Blue – Stable reliable.
- Red – Power of success.

=== Mascot ===
The mascots are Muan Ok and Muan Jai The elephant in Chiang Mai seal.

== Ceremony ==
=== Opening ceremony ===
The opening ceremony of the 41st Thailand National Games was held on December 5, 2013, at 700th Anniversary Stadium.

=== Closing ceremony ===
The closing ceremony of the 41st Thailand National Games was held on December 19, 2013, at 700th Anniversary Stadium.

== Provinces participating ==
- Amnat Charoen
- Ang Thong
- Bangkok
- Bueng Kan
- Buriram
- Chachoengsao
- Chainat
- Chaiyaphum
- Chanthaburi
- Chiang Mai (host)
- Chiang Rai
- Chonburi
- Chumphon
- Kalasin
- Kamphaeng Phet
- Kanchanaburi
- Khon Kaen
- Krabi
- Lampang
- Lamphun
- Loei
- Mae Hong Son
- Maha Sarakham
- Mukdahan
- Nakhon Nayok
- Nakhon Pathom
- Nakhon Phanom
- Nakhon Ratchasima
- Nakhon Sawan
- Nakhon Si Thammarat
- Nan
- Narathiwat
- Nong Bua Lamphu
- Nong Khai
- Nonthaburi
- Pattani
- Phang Nga
- Phattalung
- Phayao
- Phetchaburi
- Phichit
- Phitsanulok
- Phra Nakhon Si Ayutthaya
- Phrae
- Phuket
- Prachinburi
- Prachuap Khiri Khan
- Ranong
- Ratchaburi
- Rayong
- Roi Et
- Sakon Nakhon
- Samut Prakan
- Samut Sakhon
- Samut Songkhram
- Saraburi
- Satun
- Sing Buri
- Sisaket
- Songkhla
- Sukhothai
- Suphanburi
- Surat Thani
- Surin
- Tak
- Trang
- Trat
- Ubon Ratchathani
- Udon Thani
- Uthaithani
- Uttaradit
- Yala
- Yasothon

== Sports ==
- Air sports
- Archery
- Athletics
- Badminton
- Basketball
- Billiards and snooker
- Bodybuilding
- Bowling
- Bridge
- Boxing
- Cricket
- Cycling
- Dancesport
- Equestrian
- Fencing
- Field hockey
- Football
- Futsal
- Gymnastics
- Go
- Golf
- Handball
- Judo
- Kabaddi
- Karate
- Muay Thai
- Netball
- Petanque
- Pencak silat
- Rugby football
- Rowing
- Sepak takraw
- Shooting
- Softball
- Soft tennis
- Swimming
- Table tennis
- Taekwondo
- Tennis
- Volleyball
- Weightlifting
- Woodball
- Wrestling
- Wushu

=== Demonstration sports ===
- Cricket
- Netball

== Medal tally ==
* Host nation (Host)

Rank	Nation	Gold	Silver	Bronze	Total
1	Bangkok	100	97	109	306
2	Chonburi	65	39	54	158
3	Suphanburi	52	38	40	130
4	Chiang Mai*	33	46	47	126
5	Nakhon Ratchasima	21	22	26	69
6	Nonthaburi	20	21	26	67
7	Khon Kaen	17	16	24	57
8	Ubon Ratchathani	16	10	20	46
9	Chumphon	13	14	7	34
10	Samut Prakan	12	18	21	51
Totals (10 entries)		349	321	374	1,044

Preceded by 2011 Thailand National Games; Khon Kaen	Thailand National Games; Chiang Mai (2012)	Succeeded by 2013 Thailand National Games; Suphan Buri
