= Weightlifting at the 2013 SEA Games – Men's 85 kg =

The men's 85 kg event at the 2013 SEA Games took place on 15 December 2013 at Thein Phyu Stadium.

== Schedule ==
All times are Myanmar Standard Time (UTC+06:30)

Date	Time	Event
Friday, 15 December 2013	14:00	Final

== Results ==
Rank	Athlete	Group	Body weight	Snatch (kg)				Clean & Jerk (kg)				Total
Rank	Athlete	Group	Body weight	1	2	3	Result	1	2	3	Result	Total
1st place, gold medalist(s)	Pitaya Tibnoke (THA)	A	84.60	147	151	~~155~~	151	185	190	~~195~~	190	341
2nd place, silver medalist(s)	Tan Hoang Tai (VIE)	A	84.60	~~142~~	142	148	148	180	~~183~~	184	184	332
3rd place, bronze medalist(s)	Suchat Somboon (THA)	A	78.80	143	146	~~150~~	146	182	~~186~~	~~186~~	182	328
4	Jamaludin Iman (INA)	A	84.40	~~140~~	140	144	144	180	184	~~187~~	184	328

== New records ==
The following records were established during the competition.

Snatch	151	Pitaya Tibnoke (THA)	GR
Clean & Jerk	190	Pitaya Tibnoke (THA)	GR
Total	341	Pitaya Tibnoke (THA)	GR
