= 1976 Thailand Regional Games =

Sporting tournament

X Thailand National Games
- Host city: Udon Thani (Region 4), Thailand
- Teams: 10 Regions (from 71 provinces)
- Athletes: 2,480 athletes
- Events: 14 sports
- Opening: 4 December 1976
- Closing: 10 December 1976
- Main venue: Udon Thani

The 10th Thailand National Games (Thai: กีฬาเขตแห่งประเทศไทย ครั้งที่ 10, also known as the 1976 National Games and the 1976 Interprovincial Games) were held in Udon Thani, Thailand from 4 to 10 December 1976, with matches in 14 sports and athletes from 10 regions.

== Emblem ==
The emblem of 1976 Thailand National Games was a red circle, with a royal crown on top, the emblem of Sports Authority of Thailand on the inside, and surrounded by the text

อสกท กีฬาเขตแห่งประเทศไทย ครั้งที่ ๑๐ อุดรธานี ๒๕๑๙
SAT 10th Inter-Provincial Games, Udon Thani 1976

== Participating regions ==
The 10th Thailand National Games represented 10 regions from 71 provinces.

Regions	Provinces	List
1	8	Ang Thong Chai Nat Lopburi Nonthaburi Pathum Thani Phra Nakhon Si Ayutthaya Saraburi Sing Buri
2	8	Chachoengsao Chanthaburi Chonburi Nakhon Nayok Phrachinburi Rayong Samut Prakan Trat
3	7	Buriram Chaiyaphum Nakhon Ratchasima Sisaket Surin Ubon Ratchathani Yasothon
4	9	Kalasin Khon Kaen Loei Maha Sarakham Nakhon Phanom Nong Khai Roi Et Sakon Nakhon Udon Thani (Host)
5	7	Chiang Mai Chiang Rai Lampang Lamphun Mae Hong Son Nan Phrae
6	9	Kamphaeng Phet Nakhon Sawan Phetchabun Phichit Phitsanulok Sukhothai Tak Uttaradit Uthai Thani
7	8	Kanchanaburi Nakhon Pathom Phetchaburi Prachuap Khiri Khan Ratchaburi Samut Sakhon Samut Songkhram Suphan Buri
8	7	Chumphon Krabi Nakhon Si Thammarat Phang Nga Phuket Ranong Surat Thani
9	7	Narathiwat Pattani Phatthalung Satun Songkhla Trang Yala
10	1	Bangkok

== Sports ==
The 1977 Thailand National Games featured 10 Olympic sports contested at the 1977 Southeast Asian Games, 1978 Asian Games and 1976 Summer Olympics. In addition, four non-Olympic sports was featured: badminton, sepak takraw, table tennis and tennis.

- Athletics
- Badminton
- Basketball
- Boxing
- Cycling
- Football
- Judo
- Tennis
- Sepak takraw
- Shooting
- Swimming
- Table tennis
- Volleyball
- Weightlifting

Preceded by (Lopburi province) Lopburi	Thailand National Games; Udon Thani; X Edition (1976	Succeeded by Bangkok
