= 1974 Thailand Regional Games =

VIII Thailand National Games
- Host city: Chonburi (Region 2), Thailand
- Teams: 10 regions (from 71 provinces)
- Athletes: 2,485 athletes
- Events: 15 sports
- Opening: 3 December 1974
- Closing: 9 December 1974
- Main venue: Chonburi

The 8th Thailand National Games (Thai: กีฬาเขตแห่งประเทศไทย ครั้งที่ 8) also known as the 1974 National Games and the 1974 Interprovincial Games) were held in Chonburi, Thailand from 3 to 9 December 1974, with 15 sports and representative from 10 regions.

== Emblem ==
The emblem of 1974 Thailand National Games was an orange circle, with a Buddha statue on top, the emblem of Sports Authority of Thailand on the inside, and surrounded by the text

อสกท กีฬาเขตแห่งประเทศไทย ครั้งที่ ๘ จังหวัดชลบุรี ๒๕๑๗
SAT 8th Inter-Provincial Games, Chonburi 1974

.

== Participating regions ==
The 8th Thailand National Games represented 10 regions from 71 provinces.

Regions	Provinces	List
1	8	Ang Thong Chai Nat Lopburi Nonthaburi Pathum Thani Phra Nakhon Si Ayutthaya Saraburi Sing Buri
2	8	Chachoengsao Chanthaburi Chonburi (Host) Nakhon Nayok Phrachinburi Rayong Samut Prakan Trat
3	7	Buriram Chaiyaphum Nakhon Ratchasima Sisaket Surin Ubon Ratchathani Yasothon
4	9	Kalasin Khon Kaen Loei Maha Sarakham Nakhon Phanom Nong Khai Roi Et Sakon Nakhon Udon Thani
5	8	Chiang Mai Chiang Rai Lampang Lamphun Mae Hong Son Nan Phayao Phrae
6	9	Kamphaeng Phet Nakhon Sawan Phetchabun Phichit Phitsanulok Sukhothai Tak Uttaradit Uthai Thani
7	8	Kanchanaburi Nakhon Pathom Phetchaburi Prachuap Khiri Khan Ratchaburi Samut Sakhon Samut Songkhram Suphan Buri
8	7	Chumphon Krabi Nakhon Si Thammarat Phang Nga Phuket Ranong Surat Thani
9	7	Narathiwat Pattani Phatthalung Satun Songkhla Trang Yala
10	1	Bangkok

== Sports ==
The 1974 Thailand National Games featured 11 Olympic sports contested at the 1975 Southeast Asian Peninsular Games, 1974 Asian Games and 1976 Summer Olympics. In addition, four non-Olympic sports were featured: badminton, sepak takraw, table tennis and tennis.

- Athletics
- Badminton
- Basketball
- Boxing
- Cycling
- Football
- Judo
- Sailing
- Sepak takraw
- Shooting
- Swimming
- Table tennis
- Tennis
- Volleyball
- Weightlifting

Preceded by (Nakhon Si Thammarat province) Nakhon Si Thammarat	Thailand National Games; Chonburi; VIII Edition (1974	Succeeded by (Nakhon Si Thammarat province) Lopburi
