= 1973 Thailand Regional Games =

National sports competition in Thailand

VII Thailand National Games
- Host city: Nakhon Si Thammarat (Region 8), Thailand
- Teams: 10 regions (from 71 provinces)
- Athletes: 2,485 athletes
- Events: 14 sports
- Opening: 23 August 1973
- Closing: 29 August 1973
- Opened by: Prime Minister Thanom Kittikachorn
- Main venue: Nakhon Si Thammarat Province Stadium

The 7th Thailand National Games (Thai: กีฬาเขตแห่งประเทศไทย ครั้งที่ 7, also known as the 1973 National Games and the 1973 Interprovincial Games) were held in Nakhon Si Thammarat, Thailand from 23 to 29 August 1973, with contests in 14 sports and athletes from 10 regions.

== Emblem ==
The emblem of 1973 Thailand National Games was a brown circle, with the Phra Boromathat Chedi or Phra That Nakhon on top, the emblem of the Sports Authority of Thailand on the inside, and surrounded by the text

อสกท กีฬาเขตแห่งประเทศไทย ครั้งที่ ๗ จังหวัดนครศรีธรรมราช ๒๕๑๖
SAT 7th Inter-Provincial Games, Nakhon Si Thammarat 1973

.

== Participating regions ==
The 8th Thailand National Games represented 10 regions from 71 provinces.

Regions	Provinces	List
1	8	Ang Thong Chai Nat Lopburi Nonthaburi Pathum Thani Phra Nakhon Si Ayutthaya Saraburi Sing Buri
2	8	Chachoengsao Chanthaburi Chonburi Nakhon Nayok Phrachinburi Rayong Samut Prakan Trat
3	7	Buriram Chaiyaphum Nakhon Ratchasima Sisaket Surin Ubon Ratchathani Yasothon
4	9	Kalasin Khon Kaen Loei Maha Sarakham Nakhon Phanom Nong Khai Roi Et Sakon Nakhon Udon Thani
5	8	Chiang Mai Chiang Rai Lampang Lamphun Mae Hong Son Nan Phayao Phrae
6	9	Kamphaeng Phet Nakhon Sawan Phetchabun Phichit Phitsanulok Sukhothai Tak Uttaradit Uthai Thani
7	8	Kanchanaburi Nakhon Pathom Phetchaburi Prachuap Khiri Khan Ratchaburi Samut Sakhon Samut Songkhram Suphan Buri
8	7	Chumphon Krabi Nakhon Si Thammarat (Host) Phang Nga Phuket Ranong Surat Thani
9	7	Narathiwat Pattani Phatthalung Satun Songkhla Trang Yala
10	1	Bangkok

== Sports ==
The 1973 Thailand National Games featured 10 Olympic sports contested at the 1973 Southeast Asian Peninsular Games, 1974 Asian Games and 1976 Summer Olympics. In addition, four non-Olympic sports were featured: badminton, sepak takraw, table tennis and tennis.

- Athletics
- Badminton
- Basketball
- Boxing
- Cycling
- Football
- Judo
- Sepak takraw
- Shooting
- Swimming
- Table tennis
- Tennis
- Volleyball
- Weightlifting

Preceded by (Ratchaburi province) Ratchaburi	Thailand National Games; Nakhon Si Thammarat; VII Edition (1973)	Succeeded by (Chonburi province) Chonburi
