= 2002 Thailand National Games =

2002 Sport event

XXXIII Thailand National Games
- Host city: Chiang Mai
- Teams: 5 Regions/76 Teams
- Athletes: 8,940
- Events: 34 sports
- Opening: 13 December 2002
- Closing: 24 December 2002
- Opened by: Sontaya Kunplome; Minister of Tourism and Sports
- Main venue: 700th Anniversary Stadium

The 33rd Thailand National Games (Thai:การแข่งขันกีฬาแห่งชาติ ครั้งที่ 33 "นครเชียงใหม่เกมส์") also known (2002 National Games, Nakhon Chiang Mai Games) held in Chiang Mai, Thailand during 13 to 24 December 2002. Representing were 34 sports and 76 disciplines. This games held in 700th Anniversary Sports Complex.

== Mascot ==
The official mascot of the games is the lion named "Nam Chay".

== Sports ==
- Aquatics (Swimming)
- Athletics
- Badminton
- Basketball
- Billiards and snooker
- Bodybuilding
- Boxing
- Bowling
- Cycling (Track, road, and mountain biking)
- Dancesport
- Equestrian
- Fencing
- Football
- Golf
- Gymnastics (Artistic and Rhythmic)
- Handball
- Hoop takraw
- Judo
- Kabaddi
- Karate
- Muay Thai
- Pétanque
- Rowing
- Rugby football
- Sepak takraw
- Shooting
- Taekwondo
- Table tennis
- Tennis
- Thai fencing
- Volleyball (Indoor and Beach)
- Weightlifting
- Wrestling
- Wushu

== Top 10 Medals ==
Rank	Province	Gold	Silver	Bronze	Total
1	Bangkok	99	93	67	259
2	Chiang Mai	54	38	53	145
3	Chonburi	42	49	41	132
4	Suphan Buri	32	25	36	93
5	Sisaket	13	8	11	32
6	Chiang Rai	11	8	9	28
7	Nakhon Ratchasima	10	14	18	42
8	Songkhla	10	8	17	35
9	Ratchaburi	10	4	6	20
10	Chai Nat	9	9	10	28
