= Pitaya Tibnoke =

Thai weightlifter

Personal information
- Born: 21 September 1991 (age 34) Surin, Thailand

Sport
- Country: Thailand
- Sport: Weightlifting
- Event(s): 85 kg, 94 kg
Medal record
Men's Weightlifting
Representing Thailand
SEA Games
Gold medal – first place	2007 Thailand	85 kg
Gold medal – first place	2009 Laos	85 kg
Gold medal – first place	2011 Indonesia	85 kg
Gold medal – first place	2013 Myanmar	85 kg

Pitaya Tibnoke (Thai: พิทยา ตีบนอก; born 21 September 1989 in Surin, Thailand) is a weightlifter competing in the 85 kg category. He placed 12th at the 2012 Summer Olympics.

== Awards and honors ==
- 2012 – Summer Olympics – 12th place, 85 kg category
- 2014 – Asian Games – 6th place, 94 kg category
- 2011 – Thailand National Games – 2x Gold Gold Medalist
- 2011 – Thailand National Games – Silver Silver Medalist
