= 1975 Thailand Regional Games =

Sports event

IX Thailand National Games
- Host city: Lopburi (Region 1), Thailand
- Teams: 10 Regions (from 71 provinces)
- Athletes: 2,504 athletes
- Events: 14 sports
- Opening: 28 November 1975
- Closing: 4 December 1975
- Main venue: Lopburi

The 9th Thailand National Games (Thai: กีฬาเขตแห่งประเทศไทย ครั้งที่ 9, also known as the 1975 National Games and the 1975 Interprovincial Games) were held in Lopburi, Thailand from 28 November to 4 December 1975, with contests in 14 sports and athletes from 10 regions.

== Emblem ==
The emblem of 1975 Thailand National Games was the blue circle, with the Phra Prang Sam Yod, the temple in Lopburi on top, the emblem of Sports Authority of Thailand on the inside, and surrounded by the text

อสกท กีฬาเขตแห่งประเทศไทย ครั้งที่ ๙ จังหวัดลพบุรี พ.ศ.๒๕๑๘
SAT 9th Inter-Provincial Games, Lopburi 1975

== Participating regions ==
The 9th Thailand National Games represented 10 regions from 71 provinces.

Regions	Provinces	List
1	8	Ang Thong Chai Nat Lopburi (Host) Nonthaburi Pathum Thani Phra Nakhon Si Ayutthaya Saraburi Sing Buri
2	8	Chachoengsao Chanthaburi Chonburi Nakhon Nayok Phrachinburi Rayong Samut Prakan Trat
3	7	Buriram Chaiyaphum Nakhon Ratchasima Sisaket Surin Ubon Ratchathani Yasothon
4	9	Kalasin Khon Kaen Loei Maha Sarakham Nakhon Phanom Nong Khai Roi Et Sakon Nakhon Udon Thani
5	7	Chiang Mai Chiang Rai Lampang Lamphun Mae Hong Son Nan Phrae
6	9	Kamphaeng Phet Nakhon Sawan Phetchabun Phichit Phitsanulok Sukhothai Tak Uttaradit Uthai Thani
7	8	Kanchanaburi Nakhon Pathom Phetchaburi Prachuap Khiri Khan Ratchaburi Samut Sakhon Samut Songkhram Suphan Buri
8	7	Chumphon Krabi Nakhon Si Thammarat Phang Nga Phuket Ranong Surat Thani
9	7	Narathiwat Pattani Phatthalung Satun Songkhla Trang Yala
10	1	Bangkok

== Sports ==
The 1975 Thailand National Games featured 10 Olympic sports contested at the 1975 Southeast Asian Peninsular Games, 1978 Asian Games and 1976 Summer Olympics. In addition, four non-Olympic sports were featured: badminton, sepak takraw, table tennis and tennis.

- Athletics
- Badminton
- Basketball
- Boxing
- Cycling
- Football
- Judo
- Tennis
- Sepak takraw
- Shooting
- Swimming
- Table tennis
- Volleyball
- Weightlifting

Preceded by (Chonburi province) Chonburi	Thailand National Games; Lopburi; IX Edition (1975	Succeeded by (Udon Thani province) Udon Thani
