= 2008 Thailand National Games =

XXXVII Thailand National Games
- Host city: Phitsanulok
- Motto: กีฬา สานไมตรี สร้างคนดี พัฒนาชาติ
- Teams: 76
- Events: 32 sports
- Opening: 14 December 2008
- Closing: 24 December 2008
- Opened by: Sasithara Pichaichannarong, Deputy of Tourism and Sports
- Torch lighter: James Reungrod
- Main venue: Phitsanulok Central Stadium

The 37th Thailand National Games (Thai:การแข่งขันกีฬาแห่งชาติ ครั้งที่ 37 "พิษณุโลกเกมส์") (also known as 2008 National Games, Phitsanulok Games) were held in Phitsanulok, Thailand from 14 to 24 December 2008. 32 different sports were represented. Events were held in Phitsanulok Sport Center, Phitsanulok sport school, etc. and Nakhon Sawan (which also hosted the 17th national games in 1984).

== Sports ==
- Aquatics (Swimming)
- Athletics
- Badminton
- Basketball
- Billiards and Snooker
- Bodybuilding
- Boxing
- Bridge
- Cycling
  - Track
  - Road
  - Mountain biking
- Dancesport
- Football
- Go
- Golf
- Gymnastics
  - Artistic
  - Rhythmic
- Handball
- Judo
- Kabaddi
- Karatedo
- Muay Thai
- Pétanque
- Rowing
- Rugby football
- Shooting
- Softball
- Sepak takraw
- Taekwondo
- Table tennis
- Tennis
- Volleyball
  - Indoor
  - Beach
- Weightlifting
- Wrestling
- Wushu

== Top ten medals ==
Rank	Province	Gold	Silver	Bronze	Total
1	Bangkok	125	90	76	291
2	Chonburi	44	34	48	126
3	Chiang Mai	37	34	41	112
4	Phitsanulok	24	15	31	70
5	Suphan Buri	21	27	24	72
6	Nakhon Ratchasima	21	21	31	73
7	Nakhon Si Thammarat	11	10	15	36
8	Khon Kaen	9	15	8	32
9	Pathum Thani	9	11	9	29
10	Si Sa Ket	9	6	21	36
