= 2011 Thailand National Games =

Multi-sport event in Thailand

XL Thailand National Games
- Host city: Khon Kaen, Thailand
- Teams: 77
- Events: 39 sports
- Opening: 3 March 2012
- Closing: 13 March 2012
- Opened by: Chumpol Silpa-archa, Deputy Prime Minister
- Torch lighter: Somluck Kamsing
- Main venue: Khon Kaen University Stadium

The 40th Thailand National Games (Thai: การแข่งขันกีฬาแห่งชาติ ครั้งที่ 40 "ขอนแก่นเกมส์", also known as the 2011 National Games and the Khon Kaen Games) were held in Khon Kaen, Thailand from 3 to 13 March 2012 after being postponed by the 2011 Thailand floods, with competition in 39 sports and 77 disciplines. These games were held in Khon Kaen University Sport Center. Khon Kaen also hosted the 1992 Thailand National Games

== Participating provinces ==
- Amnat Charoen
- Ang Thong
- Bangkok
- Bueng Kan
- Buriram
- Chachoengsao
- Chainat
- Chaiyaphum
- Chanthaburi
- Chiang Mai
- Chiang Rai
- Chonburi
- Chumphon
- Kalasin
- Kamphaeng Phet
- Kanchanaburi
- Khon Kaen (host)
- Krabi
- Lampang
- Lamphun
- Loei
- ???
- Mae Hong Son
- Maha Sarakham
- Mukdahan
- Nakhon Nayok
- Nakhon Pathom
- Nakhon Phanom
- Nakhon Ratchasima
- Nakhon Sawan
- Nakhon Si Thammarat
- Nan
- Narathiwat
- Nong Bua Lamphu
- Nong Khai
- Nonthaburi
- ???
- Pattani
- Phang Nga
- Phattalung
- Phayao
- ???
- Phetchaburi
- Phichit
- Phitsanulok
- Phra Nakhon Si Ayutthaya
- Phrae
- Phuket
- Prachinburi
- Prachuap Khiri Khan
- Ranong
- Ratchaburi
- Rayong
- Roi Et
- ???
- Sakon Nakhon
- Samut Prakan
- Samut Sakhon
- Samut Songkhram
- Saraburi
- Satun
- Sing Buri
- Sisaket
- Songkhla
- Sukhothai
- Suphanburi
- Surat Thani
- Surin
- Tak
- Trang
- Trat
- Ubon Ratchathani
- Udon Thani
- Uthaithani
- Uttaradit
- Yala
- Yasothon

== Sports ==
- Air sports
- Athletics
- Badminton
- Basketball
- Billiards and snooker
- Bodybuilding
- Bowling
- Bridge
- Boxing
- Cycling
- Dancesport
- Fencing
- Field hockey
- Football
- Futsal
- Gymnastics
- Go
- Golf
- Handball
- Judo
- Kabaddi
- Karate
- Muay Thai
- Petanque
- Pencak silat
- Rugby football
- Sailing
- Sepak takraw
- Shooting
- Swimming
- Table tennis
- Taekwondo
- Tennis
- Volleyball
- Weightlifting
- Woodball
- Wrestling
- Wushu

=== Demonstration sports ===
- Jiu-Jitsu
- Footvolley

== Medal tally ==
* Host nation (Host)

Rank	Nation	Gold	Silver	Bronze	Total
1	Bangkok	84	95	102	281
2	Chonburi	62	47	58	167
3	Khon Kaen*	45	30	34	109
4	Suphanburi	40	40	38	118
5	Nakhon Ratchasima	25	26	29	80
6	Nonthaburi	21	17	25	63
7	Chiang Mai	20	21	35	76
8	Ubon Ratchathani	15	10	10	35
9	Samut Prakan	13	16	19	48
10	Chanthaburi	13	12	13	38
Totals (10 entries)		338	314	363	1,015

Preceded by 2010 Thailand National Games; Chonburi	Thailand National Games; Khon Kaen (2011)	Succeeded by 2012 Thailand National Games; Chiang Mai
