= 1972 Thailand Regional Games =

VI Thailand National Games
- Host city: Ratchaburi (Region 7), Thailand
- Teams: 10 regions (from 71 provinces)
- Athletes: 2,167 athletes
- Events: 12 sports
- Opening: 2 December 1972
- Closing: 8 December 1972
- Main venue: Ratchaburi

The 6th Thailand National Games (Thai:กีฬาเขตแห่งประเทศไทย ครั้งที่ 6, also known as the 1972 National Games and the 1972 Interprovincial Games) were held in Ratchaburi, Thailand from 2 to 8 December 1972, with contests in 12 sports. These games were the first competition of the new region, Bangkok, formerly part of region 1, and the new member of region 3, Yasothon, formerly part of Ubon Ratchathani.

== Emblem ==
The emblem of the 1972 Thailand National Games was a brown rhombus, with the emblem of Sports Authority of Thailand inside, surrounded by the text

อสกท กีฬาเขตแห่งประเทศไทย ครั้งที่ ๖ ราชบุรี ๒๕๑๕
SAT 6th Inter-Provincial Games, Ratchaburi 1972

== Participating regions ==
The 8th Thailand National Games represented 10 regions from 71 provinces.

Regions	Provinces	List
1	8	Ang Thong Chai Nat Lopburi Nonthaburi Pathum Thani Phra Nakhon Si Ayutthaya Saraburi Sing Buri
2	8	Chachoengsao Chanthaburi Chonburi Nakhon Nayok Phrachinburi Rayong Samut Prakan Trat
3	7	Buriram Chaiyaphum Nakhon Ratchasima Sisaket Surin Ubon Ratchathani Yasothon
4	9	Kalasin Khon Kaen Loei Maha Sarakham Nakhon Phanom Nong Khai Roi Et Sakon Nakhon Udon Thani
5	8	Chiang Mai Chiang Rai Lampang Lamphun Mae Hong Son Nan Phayao Phrae
6	9	Kamphaeng Phet Nakhon Sawan Phetchabun Phichit Phitsanulok Sukhothai Tak Uttaradit Uthai Thani
7	8	Kanchanaburi Nakhon Pathom Phetchaburi Prachuap Khiri Khan Ratchaburi (Host) Samut Sakhon Samut Songkhram Suphan Buri
8	7	Chumphon Krabi Nakhon Si Thammarat Phang Nga Phuket Ranong Surat Thani
9	7	Narathiwat Pattani Phatthalung Satun Songkhla Trang Yala
10	1	Bangkok

== Sports ==
The 1972 Thailand National Games featured 10 Olympic sports contested at the 1973 Southeast Asian Peninsular Games, 1974 Asian Games and 1972 Summer Olympics. In addition, four non-Olympic sports was featured: badminton, sepak takraw, table tennis and tennis.

- Athletics
- Badminton
- Basketball
- Boxing
- Cycling
- Football
- Judo
- Sepak takraw
- Shooting
- Swimming
- Table tennis
- Tennis
- Volleyball
- Weightlifting

Preceded by (Nakhon Sawan province) Nakhon Sawan	Thailand National Games; Ratchaburi; VI Edition (1972)	Succeeded by (Nakhon Si Thammarat province) Nakhon Si Thammarat
