= 2007 Thailand National Games =

XXXVI Thailand National Games
- Host city: Nakhon Si Thammarat
- Teams: 5 Regions/76 Teams
- Athletes: 10,204
- Events: 31 sports
- Opening: 15 September 2007
- Closing: 25 September 2007
- Opened by: Suvit Yodmani; Minister of Tourism and Sports
- Torch lighter: Sarawut Thonrit and Phichitphon Chaiyasit
- Main venue: Nakhon Si Thammarat province Stadium

Name : XXXVI Thailand National Games

Host province : Nakhon Si Thammarat

Province participating : 76 Provinces

Athletes participating : --- Athletes

Events : 31 sports

Opening ceremony : September 15, 2007

Closing ceremony : September 25, 2007

Stadium : Nakhon Si Thammarat province Central Stadium

== Sports ==
- Aquatics (Swimming)
- Athletics
- Badminton
- Basketball
- Billiards and Snooker
- Bodybuilding
- Boxing
- Cycling (Track, Road, and Mountain Biking)
- Dancesport
- Football
- Go
- Golf
- Gymnastics (Artistic and Rhythmic)
- Handball
- Hoop takraw
- Judo
- Kabaddi
- Muay Thai
- Pétanque
- Rowing
- Rugby football
- Sepak takraw
- Shooting
- Silat
- Softball
- Taekwondo
- Table tennis
- Tennis
- Volleyball (Indoor and Beach)
- Weightlifting
- Wrestling
- Wushu

== Top ten medals ==
Rank	Province	Gold	Silver	Bronze	Total
1	Bangkok	131	100	75	306
2	Suphan Buri	36	25	38	99
3	Chiang Mai	36	24	50	110
4	Chonburi	28	41	36	105
5	Nakhon Si Thammarat	23	11	25	59
6	Sisaket	13	5	21	39
7	Nonthaburi	10	10	10	30
8	Pathum Thani	9	7	10	26
9	Nakhon Ratchasima	8	17	23	48
10	Khon Kaen	8	11	9	28
