= Ratchaburi Provincial Stadium =

Thai sporting venue

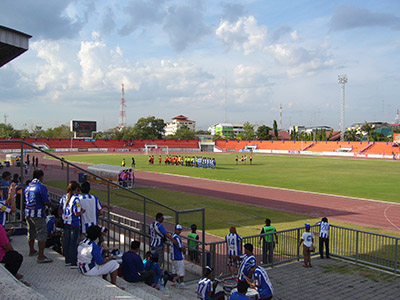
- Interactive map of Ratchaburi Provincial Stadium
- Full name: Ratchaburi Stadium
- Location: Ratchaburi, Thailand
- Coordinates: 13°31′55″N 99°48′50″E
- Capacity: 10,000
- Surface: Grass

Tenant
- 2004 Thailand National Games

Ratchaburi Provincial Stadium (Thai: สนามกีฬากลางจังหวัดราชบุรี) is a stadium in Ratchaburi Province, Thailand. The stadium holds 10,000 people. It is currently used mostly for football matches and is the formerly home stadium of Ratchaburi Mitr Phol.
