= 1977 Thailand Regional Games =

XI Thailand National Games
- Host city: Bangkok (Region 10), Thailand
- Teams: 10 Regions (from 72 provinces)
- Athletes: 2,567 athletes
- Events: 14 sports
- Opening: 11 December 1977
- Closing: 17 December 1977
- Opened by: King Bhumibol Adulyadej
- Main venue: National Stadium

The 11th Thailand National Games (Thai: กีฬาเขตแห่งประเทศไทย ครั้งที่ 11, also known as the 1977 National Games and the 1977 Inter-Provincial Games) were held in Bangkok, Thailand from 11 to 17 December 1977, with contests in 14 sports and athletes from 10 regions. These games were the qualification for Thai athletes in the 1978 Asian Games.

== Emblem ==
The emblem of 1977 Thailand National Games was a red circle, with the emblem of Sports Authority of Thailand on the inside and surrounded by the text

อสกท กีฬาเขตครั้งที่ 11 กรุงเทพมหานคร ๒๕๒๐
SAT 11th Thailand Regional Games, Bangkok 1977

== Participating regions ==
The 11th Thailand National Games represented 10 regions from 72 provinces. The country that made their Thailand National Games debut was Phayao, formerly part of Chiang Rai.

Regions	Provinces	List
1	8	Ang Thong Chai Nat Lopburi Nonthaburi Pathum Thani Phra Nakhon Si Ayutthaya Saraburi Sing Buri
2	8	Chachoengsao Chanthaburi Chonburi Nakhon Nayok Phrachinburi Rayong Samut Prakan Trat
3	7	Buriram Chaiyaphum Nakhon Ratchasima Sisaket Surin Ubon Ratchathani Yasothon
4	9	Kalasin Khon Kaen Loei Maha Sarakham Nakhon Phanom Nong Khai Roi Et Sakon Nakhon Udon Thani
5	8	Chiang Mai Chiang Rai Lampang Lamphun Mae Hong Son Nan Phayao Phrae
6	9	Kamphaeng Phet Nakhon Sawan Phetchabun Phichit Phitsanulok Sukhothai Tak Uttaradit Uthai Thani
7	8	Kanchanaburi Nakhon Pathom Phetchaburi Prachuap Khiri Khan Ratchaburi Samut Sakhon Samut Songkhram Suphan Buri
8	7	Chumphon Krabi Nakhon Si Thammarat Phang Nga Phuket Ranong Surat Thani
9	7	Narathiwat Pattani Phatthalung Satun Songkhla Trang Yala
10	1	Bangkok (Host)

== Sports ==
The 1977 Thailand National Games featured 10 Olympic sports contested at the 1977 Southeast Asian Games, 1978 Asian Games and 1980 Summer Olympics. In addition, four non-Olympic sports were featured: badminton, sepak takraw, table tennis and tennis.

- Athletics
- Badminton
- Basketball
- Boxing
- Cycling
- Football
- Judo
- Tennis
- Sepak takraw
- Shooting
- Swimming
- Table tennis
- Volleyball
- Weightlifting

Preceded by (Udon Thani province) Udon Thani	Thailand National Games; Bangkok; XI Edition (1977)	Succeeded by (Ubon Ratchathani province) Ubon Ratchathani
