= 2004 Thailand National Games =

XXXIV Thailand National Games
- Host city: Ratchaburi
- Motto: Sports development, social development (Thai: กีฬา พัฒนาคน พัฒนาสังคม)
- Teams: 5 Regions/76 Teams
- Athletes: 8,212
- Events: 35 sports
- Opening: 18 December 2004
- Closing: 28 December 2004
- Opened by: Sontaya Kunplome; Minister of Tourism and Sports
- Torch lighter: Manus Boonchamnong
- Main venue: Ratchaburi Provincial Stadium

The 34th Thailand National Games (Thai:การแข่งขันกีฬาแห่งชาติ ครั้งที่ 34 "ราชบุรีเกมส์") also known (2004 National Games, Ratchaburi Games) held in Ratchaburi, Thailand during 18 to 28 December 2004. Representing were 35 sports and 76 disciplines.

== Sports ==
- Aquatics (Swimming)
- Athletics
- Badminton
- Basketball
- Billiards and Snooker
- Bodybuilding
- Boxing
- Bowling
- Bridge
- Cycling (Track, Road, and Mountain biking)
- Dancesport
- Equestrian
- Fencing
- Football
- Golf
- Gymnastics (Artistic and Rhythmic)
- Handball
- Hoop takraw
- Judo
- Kabaddi
- Karate
- Muay Thai
- Pétanque
- Rowing
- Rugby football
- Sepak takraw
- Shooting
- Taekwondo
- Table tennis
- Tennis
- Volleyball (Indoor and Beach)
- Weightlifting
- Wrestling
- Wushu

== Top 10 Medals ==
Rank	Province	Gold	Silver	Bronze	Total
1	Bangkok	165	103	66	334
2	Chiang Mai	33	27	38	98
3	Chonburi	31	24	39	94
4	Sukhothai	12	8	8	28
5	Ang Thong	12	6	5	23
6	Sisaket	11	9	17	37
7	Ratchaburi	10	8	17	35
8	Nakhon Sawan	9	6	8	23
9	Phetchabun	9	4	4	17
10	Suphan Buri	8	19	18	45
