= 2006 Thailand National Games =

XXXV Thailand National Games
- Host city: Suphan Buri
- Teams: 5 Regions/76 Teams
- Athletes: 9,000
- Events: 33 sports
- Opening: 9 September 2006
- Closing: 19 September 2006
- Opened by: Prem Tinsulanonda; President of the Privy Council
- Torch lighter: Manit Noiwet
- Main venue: Suphan Buri Provincial Stadium

The 35th Thailand National Games ran from 9 September 2006 to 19 September 2006. It took place at the Suphan Buri Province Central Stadium.

== Sports ==
- Aquatics (Swimming)
- Athletics
- Badminton
- Baseball
- Basketball
- Billiards and Snooker
- Bodybuilding
- Boxing
- Cycling (Track, Road, and Mountain biking)
- Dancesport
- Football
- Go (game)
- Golf
- Gymnastics (Artistic and Rhythmic)
- Handball
- Hoop takraw
- Judo
- Kabaddi
- Muay Thai
- Netball
- Pétanque
- Rowing
- Rugby football
- Sepak takraw
- Shooting
- Softball
- Taekwondo
- Table tennis
- Tennis
- Volleyball (Indoor and Beach)
- Weightlifting
- Wrestling
- Wushu

== Top ten medals ==
Rank	Province	Gold	Silver	Bronze	Total
1	Bangkok	127	93	81	301
2	Suphan Buri	48	48	44	140
3	Chiang Mai	31	24	39	94
4	Chonburi	25	22	46	93
5	Nakhon Ratchasima	18	17	18	53
6	Sisaket	13	6	20	39
7	Nonthaburi	9	9	14	32
8	Ang Thong	8	6	11	25
9	Sukhothai	7	8	12	27
10	Ubon Ratchathani	7	6	9	22
