= 2018 Thailand National Games =

XLVI Thailand National Games
- Host city: Chiang Rai
- Country: Thailand
- Motto: Friendship and Pride (Thai: มิตรภาพและความภาคภูมิใจ, Mittraphap Lae Khwamphakphumchai)
- Teams: 77
- Athletes: 12,847
- Events: 41 sports
- Opening: 18 November 2018
- Closing: 28 November 2018
- Opened by: Minister Weerasak Kowsurat
- Torch lighter: Buoban Pamang
- Main venue: Chiang Rai Province Central Stadium
- Website: Chiang Rai 2018

The 2018 Thailand National Games (Thai: กีฬาแห่งชาติ พ.ศ. 2561), officially known as the XLVI Thailand National Games (Thai: กีฬาแห่งชาติ ครั้งที่ 46) and commonly known as Jiang Hai Games (Thai: เจียงฮายเกมส์), was a national multi-sport event of Thailand held between 18 and 28 November 2018 in Chiang Rai, Thailand.

== Development and preparation ==
Location in Thailand

=== Venues ===
Location	Venues	Sports
Mueang Chiang Rai	Chiangrai Province Stadium	Opening and closing ceremony, Athletics, Tennis, Soft tennis, Pétanque, Shooting sports, Handball, Sepak takraw, Extreme sport, Football
Mueang Chiang Rai	Chiangrai Provincial Administrative Organization School Stadium	Handball, Weightlifting, Pencak silat
Mueang Chiang Rai	Chiang Rai Municipality School 3 Gymnasium	Sepak takraw
Mueang Chiang Rai	Chiang Rai Municipality School 5 Gymnasium	Muay Thai
Mueang Chiang Rai	Chiang Rai Municipality School 6 Gymnasium	Gymnastics
Mueang Chiang Rai	Chiang Rai Municipality School 7 Gymnasium	Sepak takraw, Kabaddi
Mueang Chiang Rai	Chiang Rai Rajabhat University Stadium	Swimming, Volleyball, Fencing, Dancesport, Billiard sports, Snooker
Mueang Chiang Rai	Mae Fah Luang University Stadium	Basketball, Table tennis, Go
Mueang Chiang Rai	CentralPlaza Chiangrai Forecourt	Bodybuilding
Mueang Chiang Rai	Old Chiang Rai Airport	Air sports
Mueang Chiang Rai	Mengrai Maharaj Witthayakhom School Gymnasium	Volleyball, Boxing
Mueang Chiang Rai	Santiburi Country Club Chiangrai	Golf
Mueang Chiang Rai	Samakkhi Witthayakhom School Stadium	Rugby
Mueang Chiang Rai	Chiangrai Vocational College Gymnasium	Bridge
Mueang Chiang Rai	Chiang Rai Technical College Gymnasium	Indoor hockey
Mueang Chiang Rai	Bansankhong School Stadium	Field hockey
Mueang Chiang Rai	HP Badminton Court	Badminton
Mueang Chiang Rai	Mae Yao Sub District Municipality Stadium	Woodball
Mueang Chiang Rai	Singha Park Chiang Rai	Jet ski
Mueang Chiang Rai	Mueang Chiang Rai District Hall	Tug of war
Mueang Chiang Rai	Bandu School Gymnasium	Wrestling
Mueang Chiang Rai	Chiang Rai Convention and Exhibition Centre	Taekwondo, Karate, Jujutsu, Judo
Mueang Chiang Rai	Nakornchiangrai Shooting Range	Practical shooting
Mueang Chiang Rai	San Sai-Doi Hang Bypass Road – Suan Tung-Doi Tung Royal Villa Road – Singha Park Chiang Rai	Cycling
Mae Chan	Maechanwittayakhom School Stadium	Softball
Phan	Rajamangala University of Technology Lanna Gymnasium	Futsal
Wiang Chiang Rung	Banpasang School Stadium	Softball
Mueang Chiang Mai, Chiang Mai	Bully Bowl	Bowling
Mae Rim, Chiang Mai	700th Anniversary Stadium	Velodrom
Mueang Phayao, Phayao	Wat Analayo Thipphayaram Temple	BMX
Mueang Phayao, Phayao	Phayao Lake	Rowing

== The Games ==
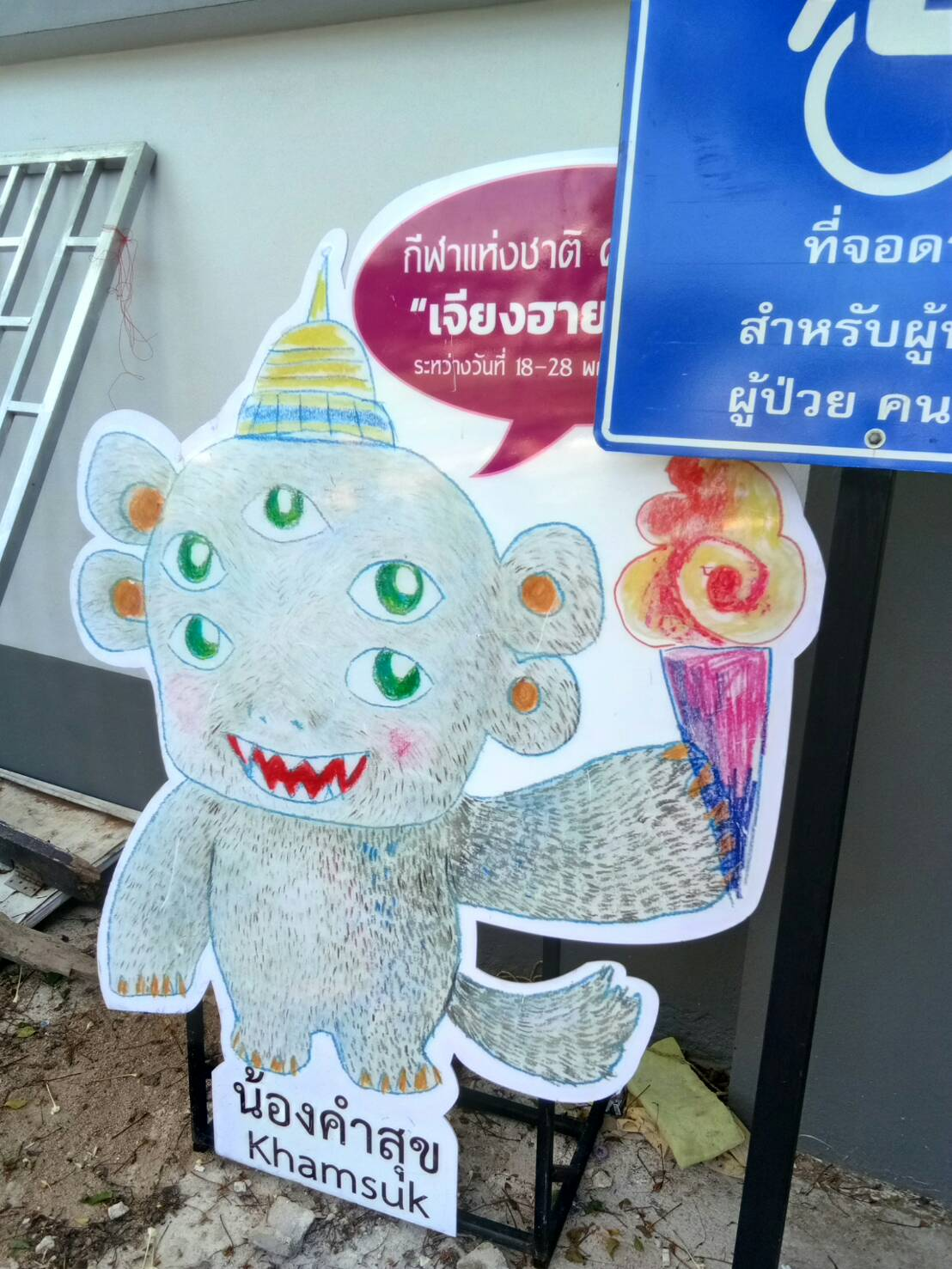
Kram Suk is mascot of 2018 Thailand National Games

=== Ceremonies ===
The opening ceremony of the 2018 Thailand National Games was held at the Chiang Rai Province Central Stadium on 18 November 2018, and the closing ceremony was on 28 November 2018

=== Sports ===
The 2018 Thailand National Games featured events in 45 sports.

- Air sports
- Aquatics
  - Swimming
- Athletics
- Badminton
- Basketball
- Billiards and snooker
- Bodybuilding
- Boxing
- Bowling
- Bridge
- Cycling
- Dancing
- Extreme sports
- Fencing
- Field hockey
- Football
  - Football
  - Futsal
- Go
- Golf
- Gymnastics
- Handball
  - Handball
  - Beach handball
- Jet ski
- Judo
- Jujitsu
- Kabaddi
- Karate
- Muaythai
- Pencak silat
- Pétanque
- Rowing
- Rugby football
  - Rugby football
  - Rugby sevens
- Sepak takraw
- Shooting
  - Shooting
  - Practical Shooting
- Table tennis
- Taekwondo
- Tennis
  - Tennis
  - Soft tennis
- Tug of war
- Volleyball
  - Volleyball
  - Beach volleyball
- Weightlifting
- Woodball
- Wrestling

=== Participating Provincial Sports Associations ===
Participating Provincial Sports Associations
- Amnat Charoen
- Ang Thong
- Bangkok
- Bueng Kan
- Buriram
- Chachoengsao
- Chai Nat
- Chaiyaphum
- Chanthaburi
- Chiang Mai
- Chiang Rai (hosts)
- Chonburi
- Chumphon
- Kalasin
- Kamphaeng Phet
- Kanchanaburi
- Khon Kaen
- Krabi
- Lampang
- Lamphun
- Loei
- Lopburi
- Mae Hong Son
- Maha Sarakham
- Mukdahan
- Nakhon Nayok
- Nakhon Pathom
- Nakhon Phanom
- Nakhon Ratchasima
- Nakhon Sawan
- Nakhon Si Thammarat
- Nan
- Narathiwat
- Nong Bua Lamphu
- Nong Khai
- Nonthaburi
- Pathum Thani
- Pattani
- Phang Nga
- Phatthalung
- Phayao
- Phetchabun
- Phetchaburi
- Phichit
- Phitsanulok
- Phra Nakhon Si Ayutthaya
- Phrae
- Phuket
- Prachinburi
- Prachuap Khiri Khan
- Ranong
- Ratchaburi
- Rayong
- Roi Et
- Sa Kaeo
- Sakon Nakhon
- Samut Prakan
- Samut Sakhon
- Samut Songkhram
- Saraburi
- Satun
- Sing Buri
- Sisaket
- Songkhla
- Sukhothai
- Suphan Buri
- Surat Thani
- Surin
- Tak
- Trang
- Trat
- Ubon Ratchathani
- Udon Thani
- Uthai Thani
- Uttaradit
- Yala
- Yasothon

=== Medal table ===
* Host nation (Host (Chiang Rai))

2018 Thailand National Games
Rank	Province	Gold	Silver	Bronze	Total
1	Bangkok	118	118	120	356
2	Udon Thani	51	30	32	113
3	Chonburi	48	50	62	160
4	Nakhon Ratchasima	34	31	34	99
5	Chiang Rai*	29	27	31	87
6	Chiang Mai	23	21	35	79
7	Suphan Buri	22	34	32	88
8	Samut Sakhon	17	12	26	55
9	Nonthaburi	16	12	20	48
10	Saraburi	13	12	10	35
Totals (10 entries)		371	347	402	1,120
