= 2000 Thailand National Games =

XXXII Thailand National Games
- Host city: Bangkok
- Teams: 5 Regions/76 Teams
- Athletes: 6,456
- Events: 45 sports
- Opening: 9 December 2000
- Closing: 20 December 2000
- Opened by: Princess Maha Chakri Sirindhorn
- Closed by: Bhumibol Adulyadej; King of Thailand
- Torch lighter: Ann Thongprasom
- Main venue: Rajamangala National Stadium

The 32nd Thailand National Games (Thai:การแข่งขันกีฬาแห่งชาติ ครั้งที่ 32 "กรุงเทพมหานครเกมส์") also known (2000 National Games, Bangkok Games) held in Bangkok, Thailand during 9 to 20 December 2000. Representing were 45 sports and 76 disciplines. This games held in Hua Mak Sports Complex.

== Venues ==
Image	Venue	Events	Capacity
	Rajamangala National Stadium	Ceremonies, Athletics, Football	49,722
	Huamark Indoor Stadium	Judo, Badminton, Muay Thai, Pencak Silat, Karate, Taekwondo	10,000

== Ceremonies ==
=== Opening ceremony ===
The official opening ceremony of this games has been 9 December 2000 at the Rajamangala National Stadium in Bangkok. It was opened by Princess Maha Chakri Sirindhorn. The torch was lit by Ann Thongprasom, Thai actress.

=== Closing ceremony ===
The official closing ceremony of this games has been 20 December 2000 at the Rajamangala National Stadium in Bangkok. It was closed by Bhumibol Adulyadej, King of Thailand.

== Sports ==
- Aquatics (Swimming)
- Archery
- Athletics
- Badminton
- Baseball
- Basketball
- Billiards and Snooker
- Bodybuilding
- Boxing
- Bowling
- Bridge
- Cycling (Track, Road, and Mountain Biking)
- Dancesport
- Equestrian
- Fencing
- Football
- Golf
- Gymnastics (Artistic and Rhythmic)
- Handball
- Hockey and ice hockey
- Hoop takraw
- Judo
- Kabaddi
- Karate
- Lawn bowls
- Muay Thai
- Pétanque
- Rowing
- Rugby football
- Sepak takraw
- Shooting
- Silat
- Softball
- Soft tennis
- Squash
- Taekwondo
- Table tennis
- Tennis
- Thai fencing
- Volleyball (Indoor and Beach)
- Weightlifting
- Windsurfing
- Wrestling
- Wushu

== Top 10 Medals ==
Rank	Province	Gold	Silver	Bronze	Total
1	Bangkok	90	78	74	242
2	Chiang Mai	52	39	34	125
3	Suphan Buri	41	57	50	148
4	Chonburi	40	26	31	97
5	Saraburi	21	13	13	47
6	Songkhla	10	9	12	31
7	Nonthaburi	9	16	12	37
8	Nakhon Ratchasima	9	12	18	39
9	Sisaket	9	5	7	21
10	Samut Prakan	8	18	22	48
