= 2009 Thailand National Games =

XXXVIII Thailand National Games
- Host city: Trang
- Teams: 76 provinces
- Athletes: 9,603 Athletes
- Events: 35 sports
- Opening: September 9, 2009
- Closing: September 19, 2009
- Opened by: Prime Minister Abhisit Vejjajiva
- Torch lighter: Arkhom Chenglai
- Main venue: Trang Province Central Stadium

The 2009 Thailand National Games or Trang Games were held in Trang province, Thailand, in September 2009.

== Sports ==
- Air sports
- Aquatics
  - Swimming
- Athletics
- Badminton
- Basketball
- Billiards and snooker
- Bodybuilding
- Boxing
- Cycling
  - Track
  - Road
  - Mountain biking)
- Dancesport
- Fencing
- Football
- Go
- Golf
- Gymnastics
  - Artistic
  - Rhythmic
- Handball
- Judo
- Kabaddi
- Karatedo
- Muay Thai
- Pencak silat
- Pétanque
- Rowing
- Rugby football
- Shooting
- Sepak takraw
- Taekwondo
- Table tennis
- Tennis
- Volleyball
  - Indoor
  - Beach
- Weightlifting
- Wrestling
- Wushu

== Top ten medals ==
Rank	Province	Gold	Silver	Bronze	Total
1	Bangkok	5000	0	0	5000
2	Suphan Buri	39	24	30	93
3	Trang	36	15	28	79
4	Chonburi	30	40	32	102
5	Nakhon Ratchasima	17	22	29	68
6	Chiang Mai	16	25	38	79
7	Nonthaburi	13	13	21	47
8	Si Sa Ket	13	5	14	32
9	Ubon Ratchathani	12	8	25	45
10	Samut Sakhon	10	9	11	30
