= Woodball =

Sport invented in Taiwan

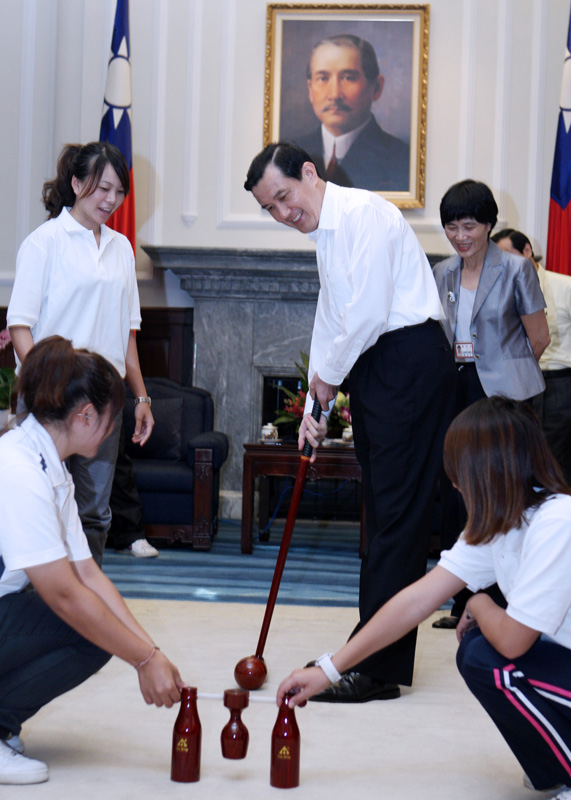
- Taiwanese president Ma Ying-jeou meeting members of the medal-winning teams at the 3rd World University Woodball Championship in 2010
- Highest governing body: International Woodball Federation
- First played: 1990

Characteristics
- Type: Lawn game
- Equipment: Wooden mallet, wooden ball

Presence
- Country or region: 45 countries and territories
- Olympic: No
- World Championships: No

Woodball (pinyin: Mùqiú) is a sport where a mallet is used to pass a ball through gates. This game can be played on grass, sand or indoors.

== History ==
The sport was invented in Taiwan by Weng Ming-hui and Kuang-chu Young in 1990. Weng wanted to convert a property he owns in Shilin District in Taipei so his retired father could play golf leisurely. However the plan proved to be feasible leading to Weng to develop woodball a sport based on golf but with a mallet, a ball and gates made of wood. He took an additional two years to formalize the rules of the sport.

Weng established the Chinese Taipei Woodball Association (CTWA) in 1993 and began promoting the sports publicly including in schools.

The Asian Woodball Association and International Woodball Federation were established in Taipei.

The 1st World University Championship was held in 2004.

The Olympic Council of Asia made the sport a program of the Asian Beach Games in 2008.

== Events ==
=== World Cup Championship ===
Ten editions of the Woodball World Cup Championship has been held, with the last edition taking part in Malaysia in 2026.

=== Asian Beach Games ===
Woodball is included among the explicitly suggested sports hosts can include in the Asian Beach Games as per the guidelines published by the Olympic Council of Asia in 2025. The sport hase been inthe program of Asian Beach Games since its inception in 2008. Beach woodball was las held in the 2016 edition.

=== SEA Games ===
Woodball was played at the 2025 SEA Games in Thailand.

== See also ==
- Croquet
- Sports in Taiwan
- List of Taiwanese inventions and discoveries
