= Maha Sarakham =

City in Thailand

Maha Sarakham มหาสารคาม
- Town
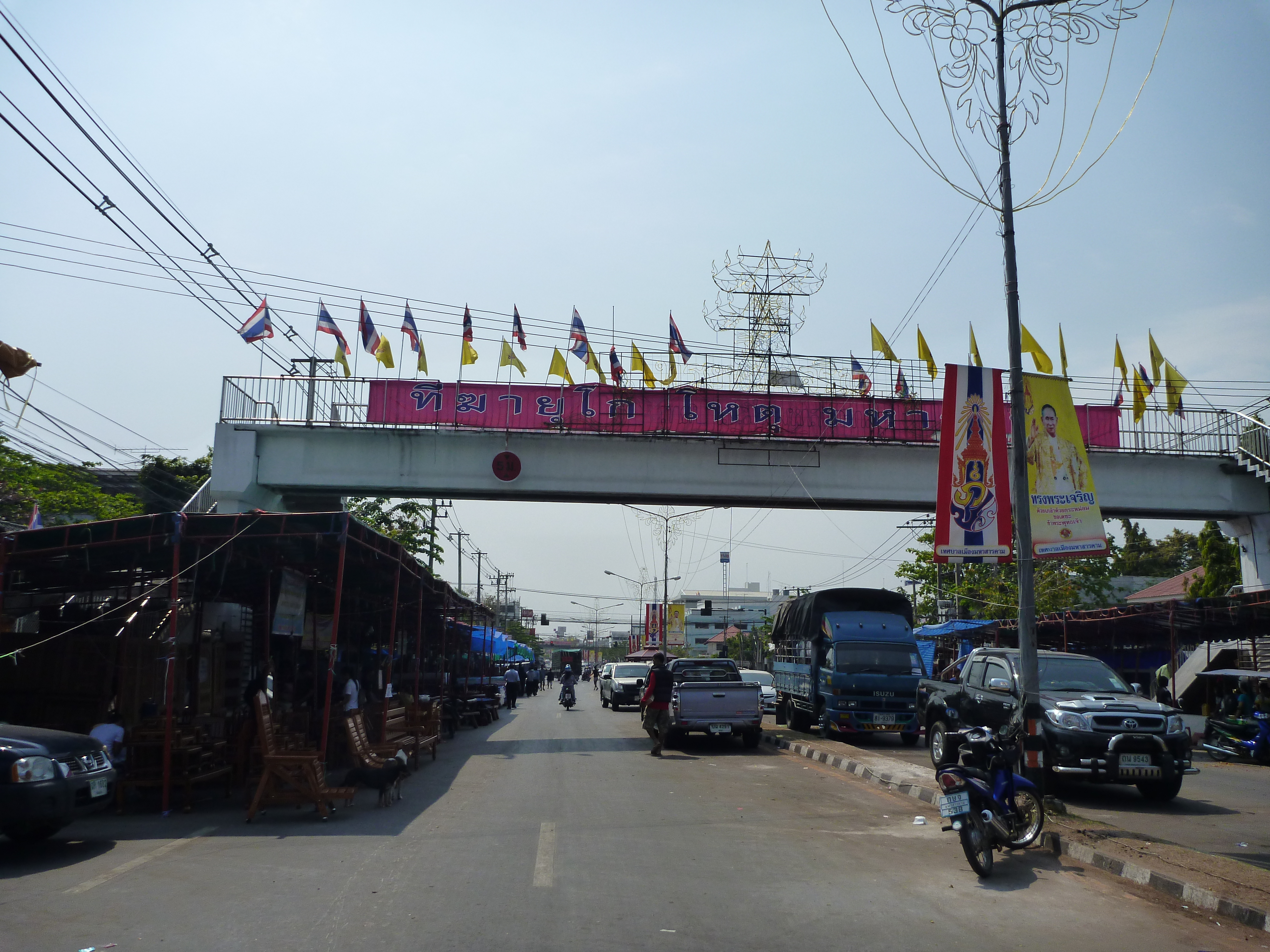
- Atmosphere of Maha Sarakham town
- Motto: เมืองน่าอยู่ คู่การศึกษา พัฒนาองค์กร คุณภาพชีวิต เศรษฐกิจและสังคม อย่างยั่งยืน
- Location in Thailand
- Coordinates: 16°10′38″N 103°18′3″E
- Country: Thailand
- Province: Maha Sarakham
- District: Mueang Maha Sarakham
- Subdistrict: Talat
- Founded: 1936

Government
  - Type: Thesaban
  - Mayor: Kittisak Khanasawas

Area
  - Total: 9.32 sq mi (24.14 km^{2})

Population (2012)
  - Total: 40,154
  - Metro density: 4,308.1/sq mi (1,663.38/km^{2})
- Time zone: UTC+7 (ICT)
- Postal code: 44000
- Website: https://main.mkm.go.th

Maha Sarakham (มหาสารคาม) is the capital city of Maha Sarakham province in Thailand's northeastern (Isan) region. Sarakham, as it is known to its inhabitants, is in a rice-growing area on the southern Khorat plain, straddling the Chi River. Mahasarakham is 475 km northeast of Bangkok and 73 km southeast of Khon Kaen.

The city has long been known as a regional education centre, the so-called "Taxila of Isan" (taking this name from the ancient Hindu centre of learning). It is home to six colleges, as well as Mahasarakham University (MSU) and Maha Sarakham Rajabhat University. Sarakham has the feel of a student town with the younger, more cosmopolitan population much in evidence in the downtown campus area and near MSU's second campus seven kilometres away at Kham Riang.

For a time Mahasarakham ranked with Sisaket as among the poorest cities in Isan. This is changing, partly under the influence of the rapidly growing student population. Today Maha Sarakham possesses two cinemas, a modern department store and market. There has been extensive building, especially on the eastern fringes of the city.

Maha Sarakham has no railway station or airport, and the main transport links are via express bus, or by road connections to the airports in Khon Kaen and Roi Et. Recently the road link south was upgraded and is now mainly dual carriageway highway.

== Climate ==
Climate data for Mahasarakham (1991–2020, extremes 1970-present)
| Month | Jan | Feb | Mar | Apr | May | Jun | Jul | Aug | Sep | Oct | Nov | Dec | Year |
|---|---|---|---|---|---|---|---|---|---|---|---|---|---|
| Record high °C (°F) | 38.0 (100.4) | 39.7 (103.5) | 41.7 (107.1) | 43.6 (110.5) | 42.6 (108.7) | 41.2 (106.2) | 38.5 (101.3) | 37.0 (98.6) | 37.2 (99.0) | 37.2 (99.0) | 38.0 (100.4) | 36.7 (98.1) | 43.6 (110.5) |
| Mean daily maximum °C (°F) | 31.5 (88.7) | 33.6 (92.5) | 35.8 (96.4) | 36.9 (98.4) | 35.7 (96.3) | 34.7 (94.5) | 33.8 (92.8) | 33.1 (91.6) | 32.8 (91.0) | 32.6 (90.7) | 32.3 (90.1) | 31.0 (87.8) | 33.7 (92.6) |
| Daily mean °C (°F) | 23.9 (75.0) | 26.0 (78.8) | 28.7 (83.7) | 30.2 (86.4) | 29.6 (85.3) | 29.3 (84.7) | 28.7 (83.7) | 28.1 (82.6) | 27.9 (82.2) | 27.3 (81.1) | 25.8 (78.4) | 23.8 (74.8) | 27.4 (81.4) |
| Mean daily minimum °C (°F) | 17.4 (63.3) | 19.6 (67.3) | 22.8 (73.0) | 24.8 (76.6) | 25.1 (77.2) | 25.1 (77.2) | 24.7 (76.5) | 24.4 (75.9) | 24.1 (75.4) | 22.9 (73.2) | 20.4 (68.7) | 17.7 (63.9) | 22.4 (72.4) |
| Record low °C (°F) | 5.6 (42.1) | 9.0 (48.2) | 10.4 (50.7) | 16.0 (60.8) | 18.0 (64.4) | 21.5 (70.7) | 21.9 (71.4) | 20.3 (68.5) | 20.5 (68.9) | 15.2 (59.4) | 6.6 (43.9) | 5.3 (41.5) | 5.3 (41.5) |
| Average precipitation mm (inches) | 7.0 (0.28) | 14.2 (0.56) | 47.9 (1.89) | 93.4 (3.68) | 178.4 (7.02) | 155.0 (6.10) | 195.2 (7.69) | 249.1 (9.81) | 264.4 (10.41) | 92.9 (3.66) | 15.2 (0.60) | 3.0 (0.12) | 1,315.7 (51.80) |
| Average precipitation days (≥ 1.0 mm) | 0.9 | 1.6 | 3.2 | 6.0 | 11.0 | 10.0 | 12.3 | 14.5 | 14.9 | 6.8 | 1.5 | 0.6 | 83.3 |
| Average relative humidity (%) | 70.2 | 66.8 | 65.5 | 67.5 | 74.8 | 76.4 | 78.5 | 81.3 | 83.3 | 78.8 | 72.7 | 70.0 | 73.8 |
| Average dew point °C (°F) | 17.5 (63.5) | 18.7 (65.7) | 20.9 (69.6) | 22.8 (73.0) | 24.2 (75.6) | 24.4 (75.9) | 24.3 (75.7) | 24.4 (75.9) | 24.5 (76.1) | 22.9 (73.2) | 20.1 (68.2) | 17.5 (63.5) | 21.9 (71.4) |
| Mean monthly sunshine hours | 275.9 | 243.0 | 238.7 | 243.0 | 198.4 | 156.0 | 120.9 | 117.8 | 144.0 | 198.4 | 252.0 | 275.9 | 2,464 |
Source 1: World Meteorological Organization
Source 2: Office of Water Management and Hydrology, Royal Irrigation Department (sun 1981–2010)(extremes)
