= Chai Nat =

Province of Thailand

Chai Nat ชัยนาท
- Town Municipality
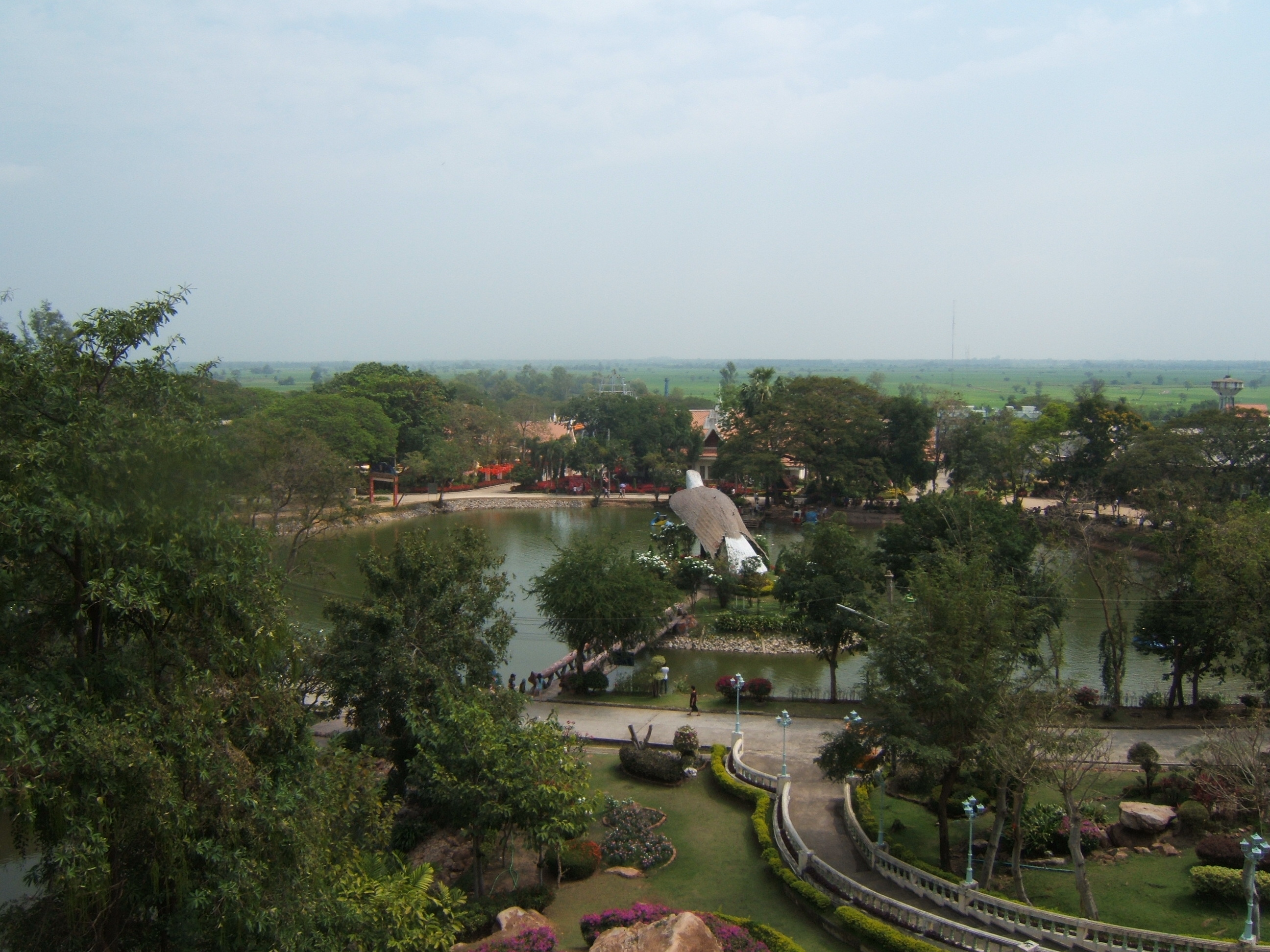
- Bird Park of Chai Nat

- Location in Thailand
- Coordinates: 15°11′14″N 100°7′42″E
- Country: Thailand
- Province: Chai Nat province
- District: Mueang Chai Nat district

Population (2006)
  - Total: 14,469
- Time zone: UTC+7 (ICT)

Chai Nat (Thai: ชัยนาท, pronounced [t͡ɕʰāj nâːt]) is a town (thesaban mueang) in central Thailand, capital of Chai Nat province. It covers the whole tambon tambon Nai Mueang and parts of Ban Kluai, Tha Chai and Khao Tha Phra, all in Mueang Chai Nat district. As of 2006 it had a population of 14,469.

The town is on the banks of the Chao Phraya River. The main road through the town is Phahonyothin Road (Highway 1). Bangkok lies 188 km to the south.

According to the Ayutthaya Testimonies, the city was founded by the Siamese monarch Surindraraja in the early 11th century, who established it as the new capital of the Phraek Si Racha region, thereby superseding Phraek Si Racha as the administrative center of the polity.

== Climate ==
Climate data for Chainat (1993–2022)
Month	Jan	Feb	Mar	Apr	May	Jun	Jul	Aug	Sep	Oct	Nov	Dec	Year
Mean daily maximum °C (°F)	31.9 (89.4)	33.6 (92.5)	35.7 (96.3)	36.9 (98.4)	35.8 (96.4)	34.6 (94.3)	33.7 (92.7)	33.6 (92.5)	33.2 (91.8)	32.6 (90.7)	32.6 (90.7)	31.5 (88.7)	33.8 (92.9)
Daily mean °C (°F)	25.3 (77.5)	27.1 (80.8)	29.2 (84.6)	30.3 (86.5)	30.0 (86.0)	29.2 (84.6)	28.6 (83.5)	28.4 (83.1)	28.2 (82.8)	28.0 (82.4)	27.3 (81.1)	25.4 (77.7)	28.1 (82.6)
Mean daily minimum °C (°F)	20.3 (68.5)	22.3 (72.1)	24.4 (75.9)	25.6 (78.1)	25.9 (78.6)	25.6 (78.1)	25.2 (77.4)	25.1 (77.2)	23.5 (74.3)	23.3 (73.9)	23.4 (74.1)	20.7 (69.3)	23.8 (74.8)
Average precipitation mm (inches)	4.4 (0.17)	12.2 (0.48)	28.9 (1.14)	73.0 (2.87)	133.9 (5.27)	119.5 (4.70)	115.8 (4.56)	136.3 (5.37)	238.8 (9.40)	138.4 (5.45)	28.0 (1.10)	6.7 (0.26)	1,035.9 (40.77)
Average relative humidity (%)	70	71	70	69	73	76	78	79	82	80	74	70	74
Source: Soil Resources Survey and Research Division
