= Phichit =

Town in central Thailand

- Town Municipality
- Phichit town เทศบาลเมืองพิจิตร
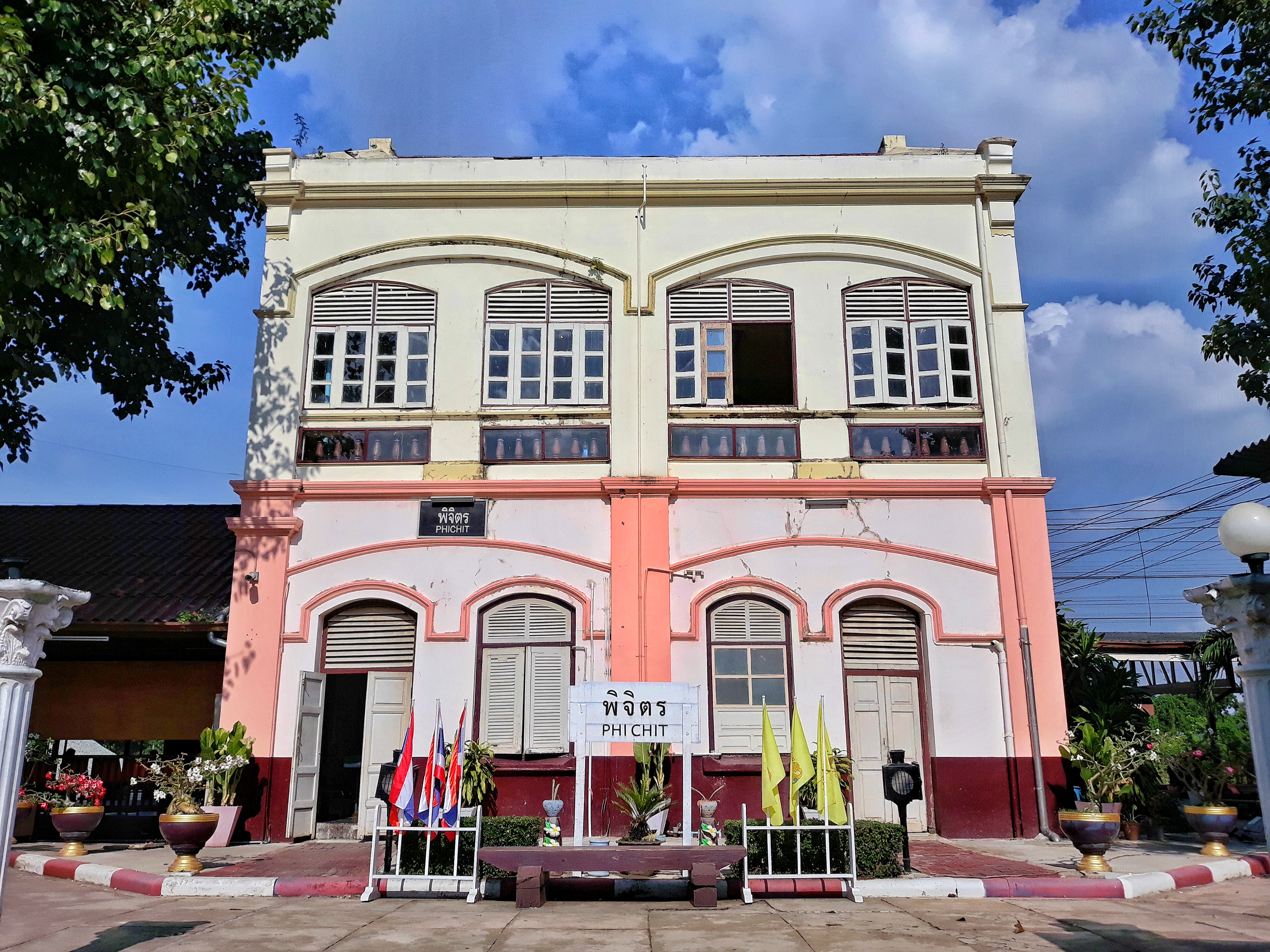
- Phichit Railway Station
- Interactive map of Phichit
- Location within Thailand Location within Asia
- Country: Thailand
- Province: Phichit
- District: Mueang Phichit
- Community: 25 Communities

Government
  - Type: Town municipality
  - Mayor: Chalermsak Khongkanphai

Area
  - Total: 12.02 km^{2} (4.64 sq mi)

Population (2024)
  - Total: 107,683
  - Density: 8,959/km^{2} (23,200/sq mi)
- Time zone: UTC+7:00 (ICT)
- Postal code: 66000
- Calling code: (+66) 55
- Website: www.phichitmuni.go.th

Phichit (Thai: พิจิตร, เมือง) is a town (thesaban mueang) in central Thailand, capital of Phichit Province. It covers the whole tambon Nai Mueang of Mueang Phichit district, an area of 12.017 km². As of 2005, it had a population of 23,791. Phichit is 326 km north of Bangkok.

== Geography ==
Phichit is at the confluence of the Wat Ta Yom River and the Nan River.

== History ==
The old town of Phichit was established in 1058 CE by Phraya Kotabongthevaraja, and was first part of the Sukhothai kingdom, and later of Ayutthaya. The name of the city changed several times. At first, it was called Sra Luang (city of the royal pond), in Ayutthaya times it was called Okhaburi ("city in the swamp"), and then finally Phichit ("beautiful city").

== Attractions ==
The Wat Tha Luang temple in Phichit is home to a large Luang Phor Phet Buddha image.

== Notable individuals ==
- Chaleo Yoovidhya (c. 1932 – 17 March 2012) once listed as the richest person in Thailand

== Climate ==
Climate data for Phichit (2006–2019)
Month	Jan	Feb	Mar	Apr	May	Jun	Jul	Aug	Sep	Oct	Nov	Dec	Year
Mean daily maximum °C (°F)	31.1 (88.0)	33.3 (91.9)	35.2 (95.4)	36.9 (98.4)	35.4 (95.7)	34.1 (93.4)	32.9 (91.2)	32.5 (90.5)	32.6 (90.7)	32.7 (90.9)	32.7 (90.9)	31.2 (88.2)	33.4 (92.1)
Daily mean °C (°F)	24.7 (76.5)	26.8 (80.2)	28.8 (83.8)	30.6 (87.1)	29.9 (85.8)	29.1 (84.4)	28.3 (82.9)	28.1 (82.6)	28.2 (82.8)	28.1 (82.6)	27.1 (80.8)	25.0 (77.0)	27.9 (82.2)
Mean daily minimum °C (°F)	19.3 (66.7)	21.3 (70.3)	23.6 (74.5)	25.2 (77.4)	25.5 (77.9)	25.1 (77.2)	24.8 (76.6)	24.7 (76.5)	24.8 (76.6)	24.5 (76.1)	22.5 (72.5)	19.7 (67.5)	23.4 (74.1)
Average precipitation mm (inches)	11.3 (0.44)	12.8 (0.50)	19.3 (0.76)	59.6 (2.35)	149.5 (5.89)	157.8 (6.21)	168.3 (6.63)	225.5 (8.88)	295.1 (11.62)	118.1 (4.65)	29.0 (1.14)	9.9 (0.39)	1,256.2 (49.46)
Average precipitation days	1.9	1.7	3.4	5.8	13.3	15.4	19.2	20.3	18.9	11.7	3.0	1.0	115.6
Average relative humidity (%)	76	74	72	68	75	79	82	83	84	82	78	76	77
Source: Soil Resources Survey and Research Division
