= Phatthalung =

Phatthalung พัทลุง
- Town
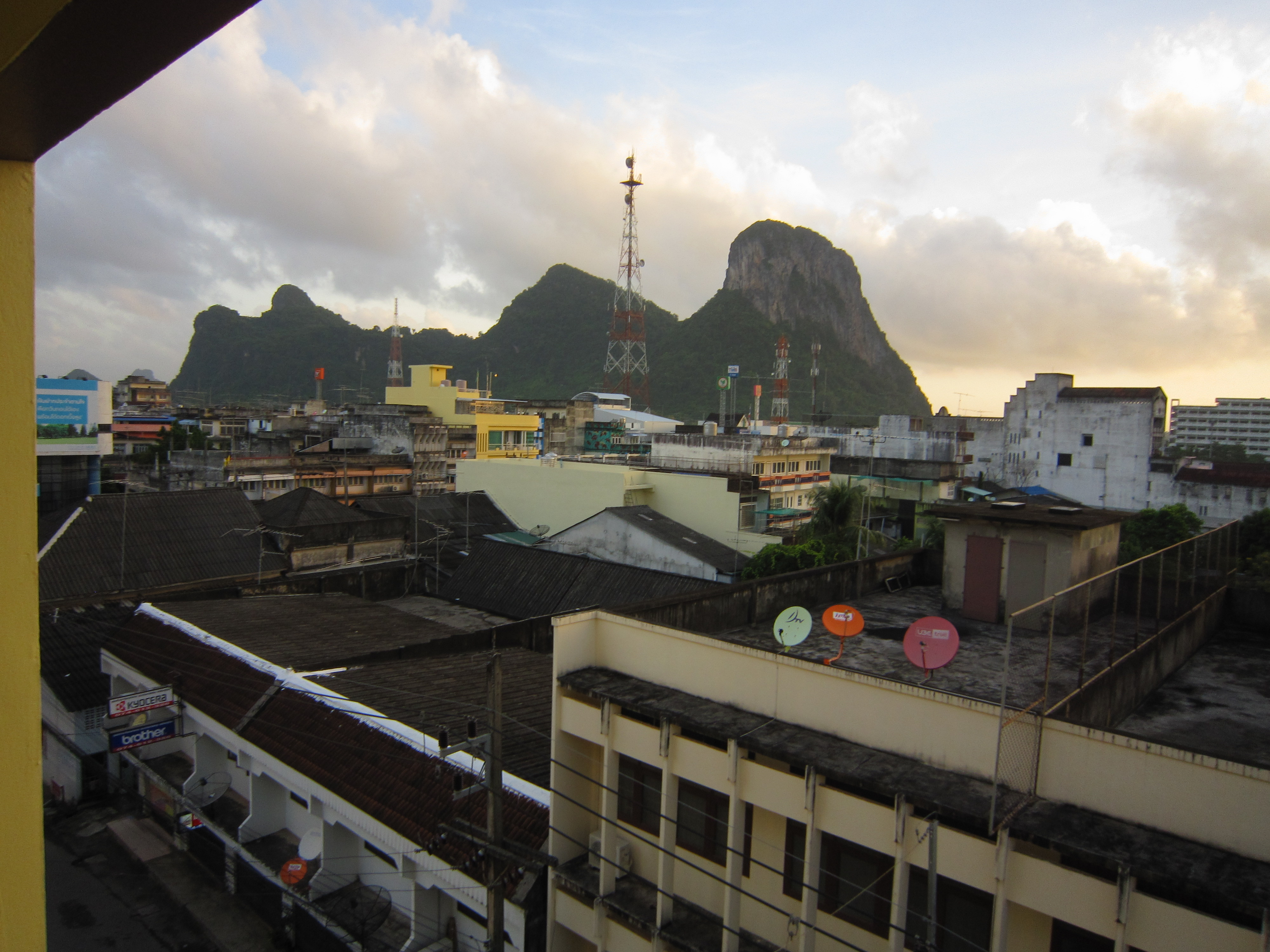

- Location in Thailand
- Coordinates: 7°37′00″N 100°04′40″E
- Country: Thailand
- Province: Phatthalung Province
- District: Mueang Phatthalung District

Population (2005)
  - Total: 38,576
- Time zone: UTC+7 (ICT)

Phatthalung (Thai: พัทลุง, pronounced [pʰát.tʰā.lūŋ]) is a town (thesaban mueang) in southern Thailand, capital of Phatthalung Province.

The town covers tambon Khuhu Sawan, and small parts of tambon Khao Chiak, Tha Mi Ram, Prang Mu, Lampam, Tamnan, and Khuan Maphrao, all in Mueang Phatthalung District. In 2005 it had a population of 38,576. Phatthalung is 851 km by road south of Bangkok.
