= Samut Prakan =

City in Thailand

Samut Prakan สมุทรปราการ
- City Municipality
- City of Samut Prakan เทศบาลนครสมุทรปราการ
- A street in Samut Prakan

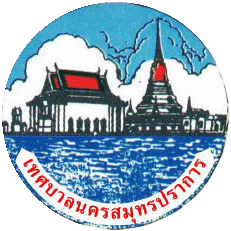
- Seal

- Location in Bangkok Metropolitan Region Location in Thailand
- Coordinates: 13°36′1″N 100°35′47″E
- Country: Thailand
- Region: Central Thailand
- Province: Samut Prakan
- District: Mueang Samut Prakan

Government
  - Type: City Municipality

Area
  - Total: 7.33 km^{2} (2.83 sq mi)

Population (2020)
  - Total: 49,600
  - Density: 6,770/km^{2} (17,500/sq mi)
- Time zone: UTC+7 (ICT)
- Postcode: 10270
- Area code: (+66) 2
- Website: samutprakancity.go.th

Samut Prakan (Thai: สมุทรปราการ, RTGS: Samut Prakan) officially the City of Samut Prakan (Thai: เทศบาลนครสมุทรปราการ, RTGS: Thetsaban Nakhon Samut Prakan) is the capital of Samut Prakan province in Thailand. It is located 25 kilometres (16 mi) south of Bangkok. The city was established in 1999.

== Transport ==
=== Roads ===
- Sukhumvit Road
- Srinagarindra Road

=== Railway ===
- BTS Skytrain : Sukhumvit Line

== Education ==
- Royal Thai Naval Academy

== Sports ==
- Samut Prakan F.C.

== See also ==
- Samut Prakan radiation accident
