= Lang Suan =

Lang Suan may refer to

- Lang Suan (town), Chumphon, Thailand
- Lang Suan District, surrounding the town
- Lang Suan River, mostly within the district
- Lang Suan Province, a former Thai province, part of Monthon Surat, abolished in 1932
- Lang Suan, a street in Bangkok's Pathum Wan District
