= Chumphon (disambiguation) =

Chumphon may refer to these places in Thailand:

- the town Chumphon
- Chumphon Province
- Mueang Chumphon district
- Monthon Chumphon, a former administrative entity
- Chumphon subdistrict in Moei Wadi District, Roi Et
- Chumphon subdistrict in Ongkharak District, Nakhon Nayok
- Chumphon subdistrict in Phon Phisai District, Nong Khai
- Chumphon subdistrict in Sathing Phra District, Songkhla
- Chumphon subdistrict in Srinagarindra District, Phatthalung
