= Streptomyces verrucosisporus =

Scientific classification
- Domain: Bacteria
- Kingdom: Bacillati
- Phylum: Actinomycetota
- Class: Actinomycetes
- Order: Streptomycetales
- Family: Streptomycetaceae
- Genus: Streptomyces
- Species: S. verrucosisporus

Binomial name
- Streptomyces verrucosisporus Phongsopitanun et al. 2016

Type strain
- JCM 18519, PCU 343, BM1-4, CPB1-1, CPB1-18, CPB2-10, CPB3-1

Species of bacterium

Streptomyces verrucosisporus is a bacterium species from the genus of Streptomyces which has been isolated from marine sediments from the Chumphon Province on Thailand.

== Cell structure ==
Forms an extensively branched substrate mycelium and aerial mycelium, which are typical features of the genus Streptomyces. The aerial mycelium is white to greenish-grey, and the spore chains are of the open-looped spiral (retinaculum-apertum) type, with ellipsoid to ovule-shaped spores

== See also ==
- List of Streptomyces species
