= Streptomyces chumphonensis =

Scientific classification
- Domain: Bacteria
- Kingdom: Bacillati
- Phylum: Actinomycetota
- Class: Actinomycetia
- Order: Streptomycetales
- Family: Streptomycetaceae
- Genus: Streptomyces
- Species: S. chumphonensis

Binomial name
- Streptomyces chumphonensis Phongsopitanun et al. 2014

Type strain
- JCM 18522, PCU 330, CPB4-7, KK1-2, TISTR 2106

Species of bacterium

Streptomyces chumphonensis is a bacterium species from the genus of Streptomyces which has been isolated from marine sediments from the Chumphon province in Thailand.

== See also ==
- List of Streptomyces species
