= Ko Phithak =

Coordinates: 10°03′N 99°11′E

Ko Phithak เกาะพิทักษ์
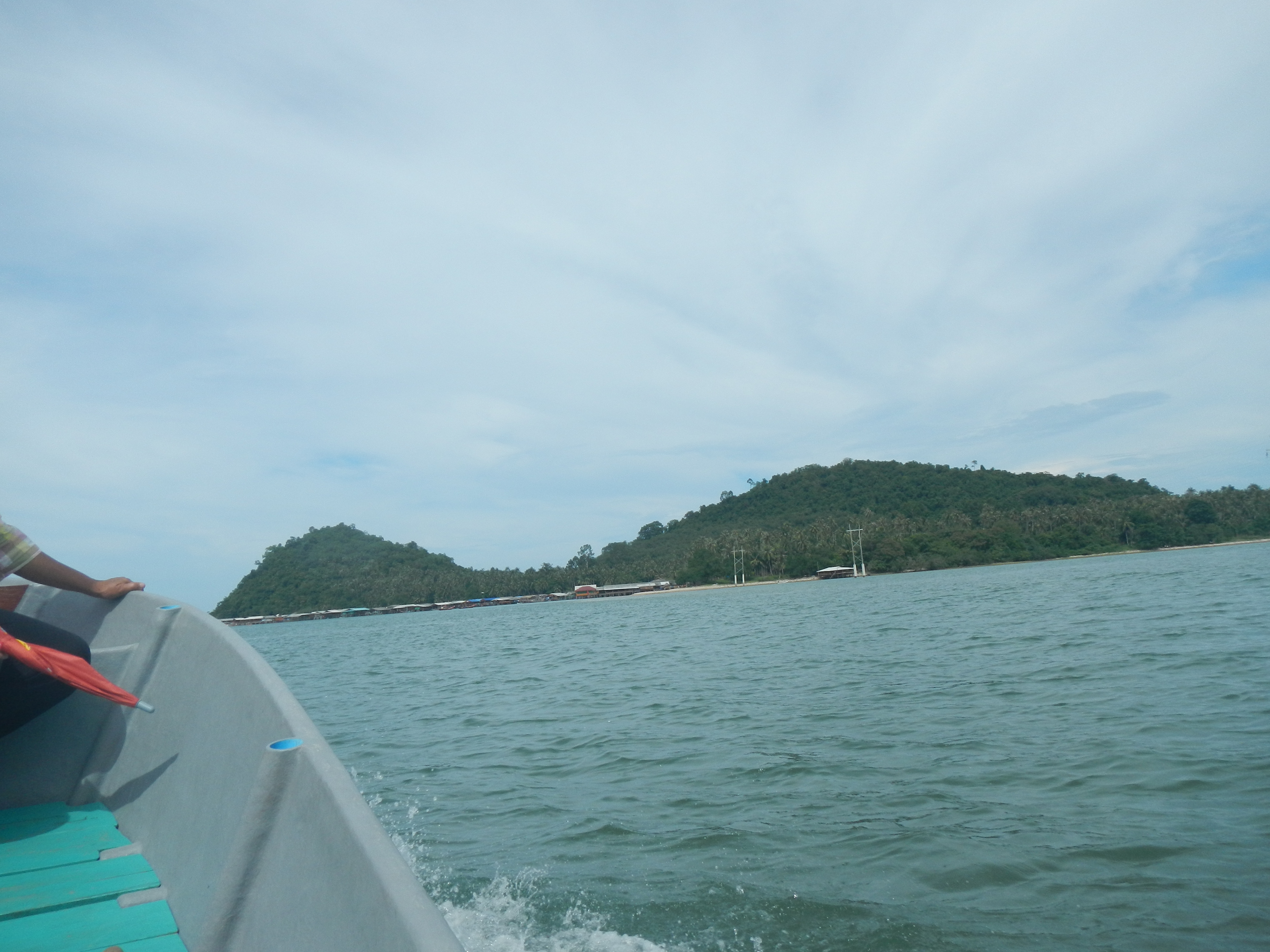

- Location within Thailand
- Country: Thailand
- Province: Chumphon

Area
  - Total: 1.139 km^{2} (0.440 sq mi)

Population
  - Total: 98
- Time zone: UTC+7 (ICT)

Ko Phithak or Phithak Island (also spelled Koh Pitak, Thai: เกาะพิทักษ์, Thai pronunciation: [kɔ̀ʔ pʰí.tʰák], lit. "Protect Island") is a small island in Thailand, in Chumphon Province on the eastern shore of the Gulf of Thailand. The island has an area of about 1.1392 km^{2} (712 rai) and there are about 42 households. Most of the local people are Buddhists who earn money by exporting seafood. Other sources of income include growing coconut trees, which explains why the island has many coconut trees. The residents make coconut juice to sell to tourists and to export.

Phitak Island is close to the coast and the all flat areas are coconut plantations, so there is no room to build a school or a temples. Tourists can walk everywhere because footpaths are laid out along around the island. The Ko Phitak community is known as an excellent environmental conservation community, which is particularly known for its giant clam conservation center.

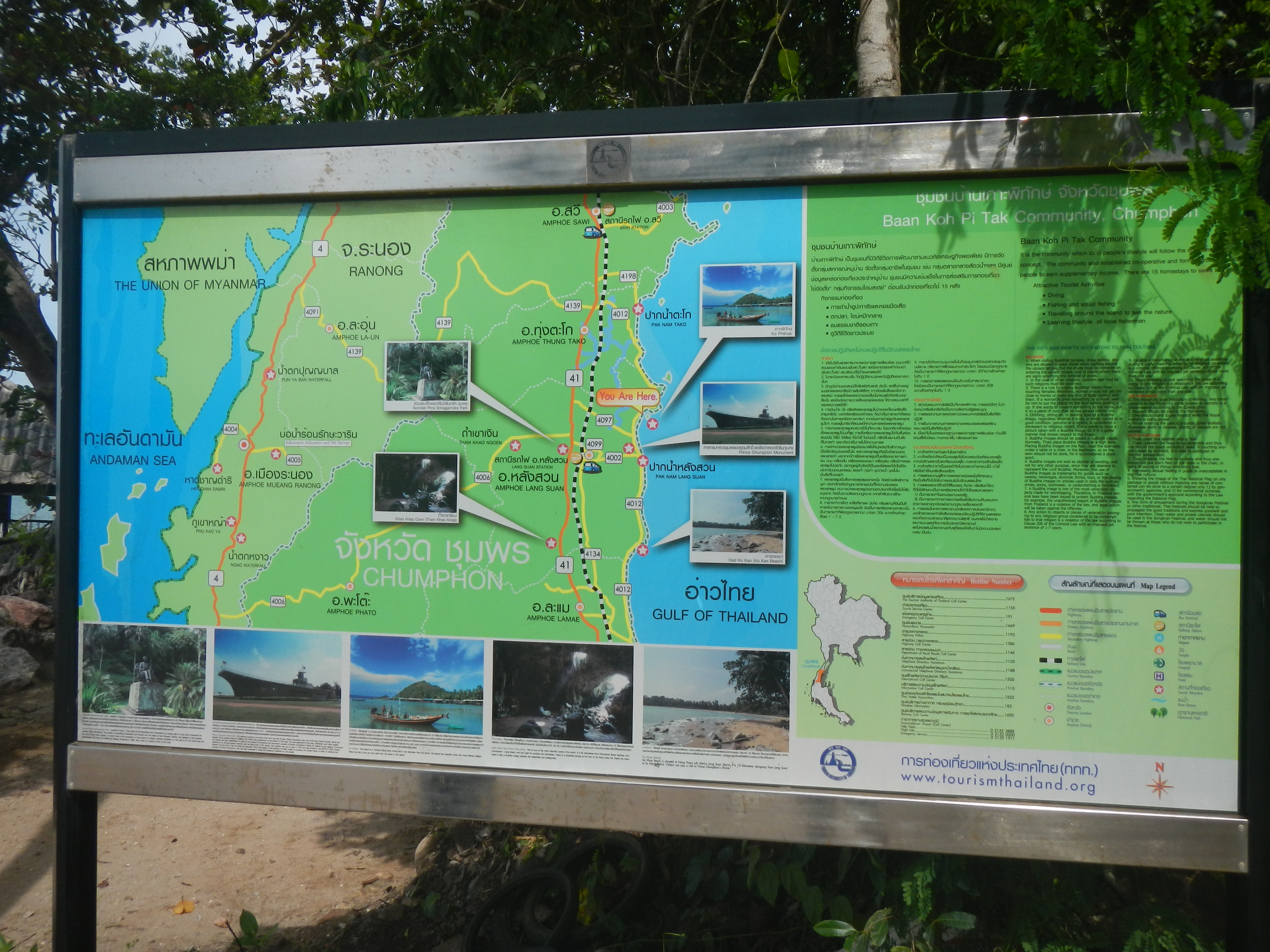
About Ko Pitak

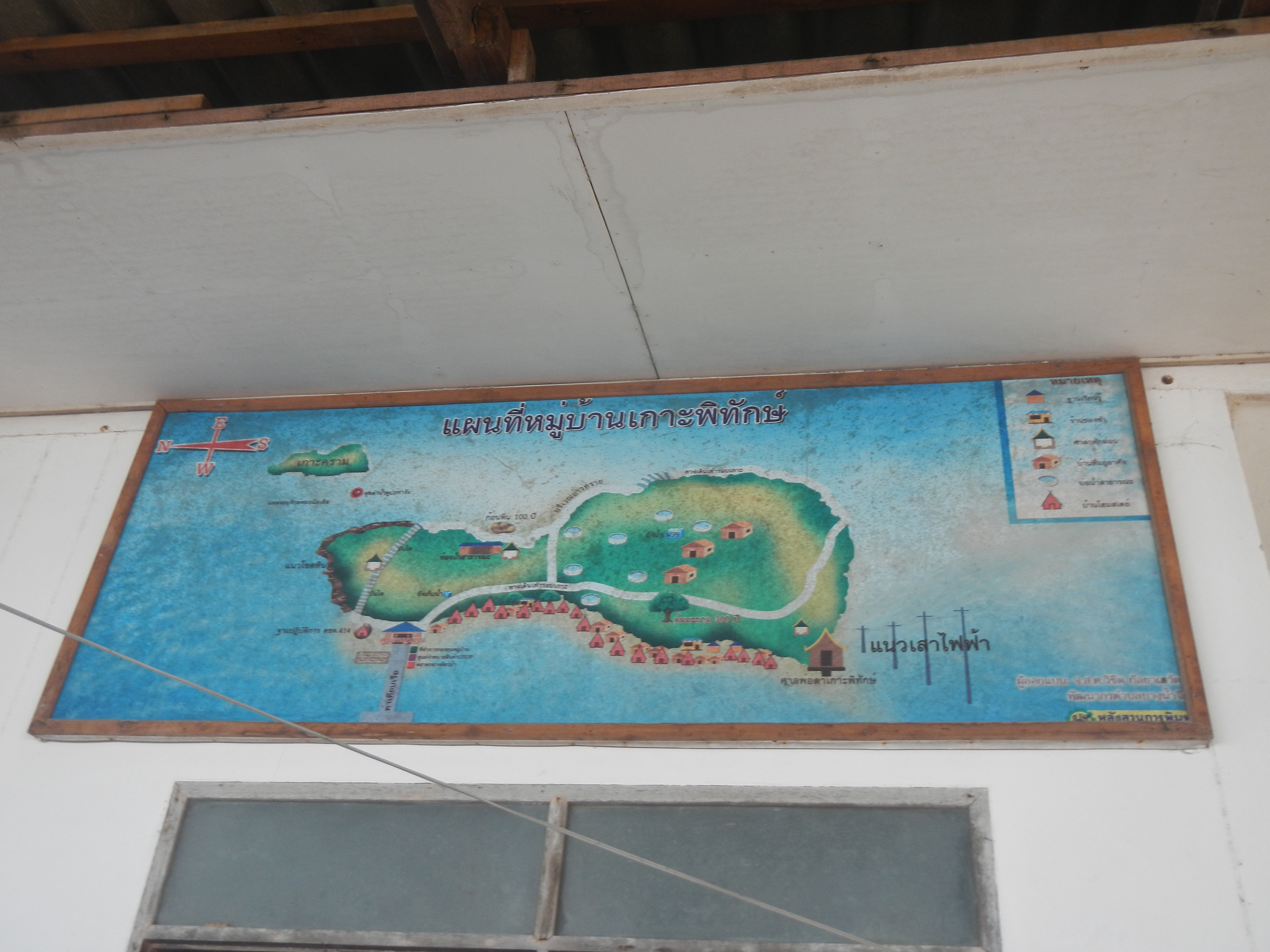
Map of the island

== History ==
In the past, neighboring people called this island "Phi Tak" (Thai: ผีทัก), which means "ghost greeting". There is a story about a fisherman who sailed a boat to catch fish near the island. He said that he saw a human shadow waving a hand and yelling out something to him, so he sailed the boat to the island, but there was nothing. After that, the island had been named Phi Tak, as people thought that the shadow was a ghost. Then, some people from the coast, who were not afraid of the ghost story, emigrated to the island. Finally, the name of the island was changed to "Phi Thak" (Thai: พิทักษ์) which means "protect" because the people who lived there wanted to change the name to be more auspicious.

== Tourism ==
Each year, Ko Phithak welcomes more than 100,000 visitors.

The local people live in wooden houses built along the coast with high spaces underneath to allow the flow of the tides. The villagers take care of each other, and the tradition of "song keang" (Thai: ส่งแกง) (sharing homemade dish with others) still exists in the island. The west side to the south side of the island has most houses because the mountain in the east blocks the prevailing wind. The best beach is on the east side, called "peace of eastern" beach, 400 m long with clear water. The north of the island has a lot of viewpoints, 200 meters in height, and small rest pavilions. The annual marathon walking activity during ebb tide season is well known in Chumphon Province. This activity is carried out by people in Lang Suan and some non-local people by walking from Pak Nam (lit., estuary) to the island in order to promote unity of community and health.

There are several good diving sites nearby. Among them are Ko Ngam Yai, Ko Ngam Noi and Ko Rang Ka Chiu, part of Mu Ko Chumphon National Park, which covers 317 square km and has a sea area of 165,969 rai.

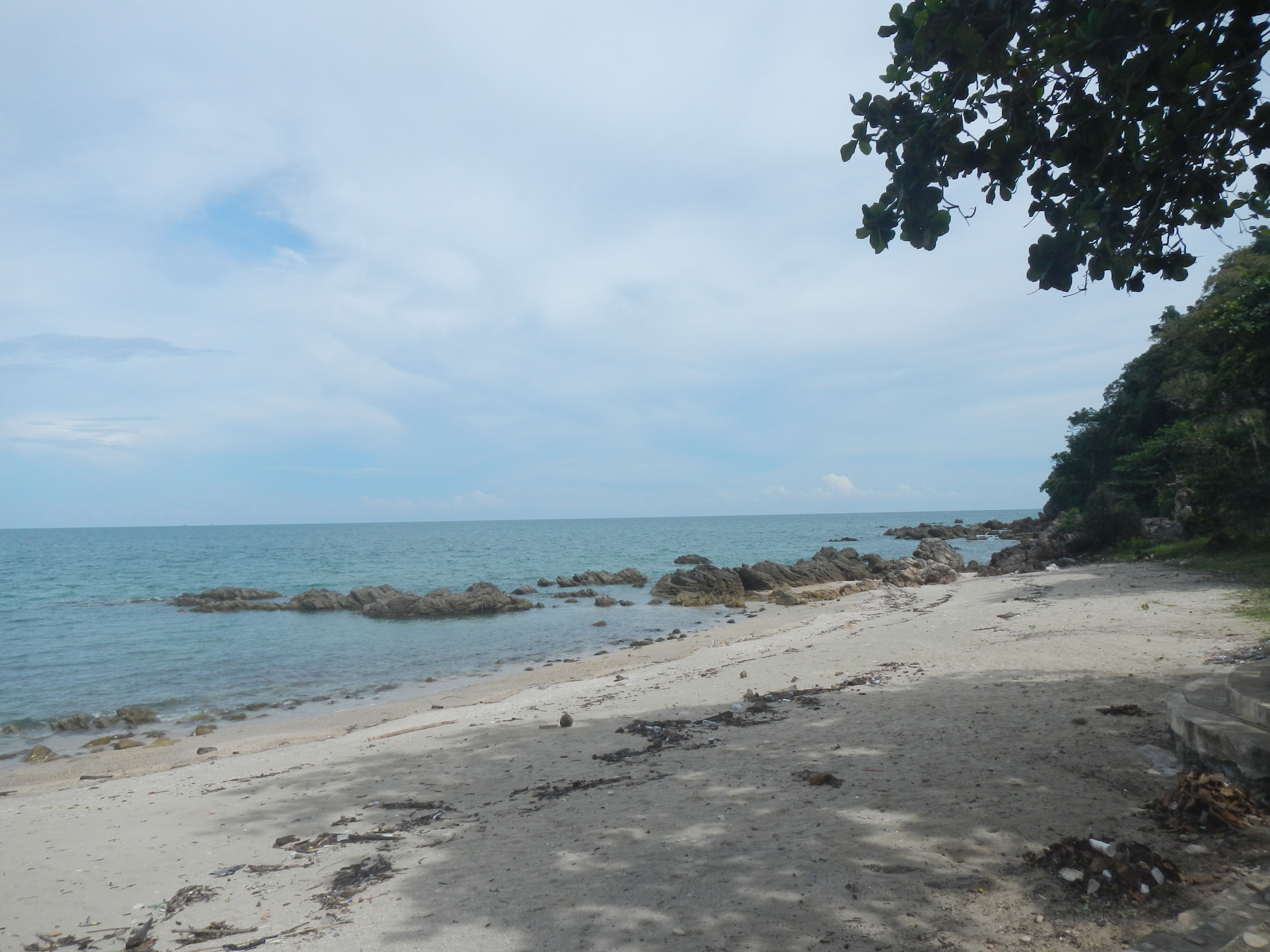
Eastern Beach

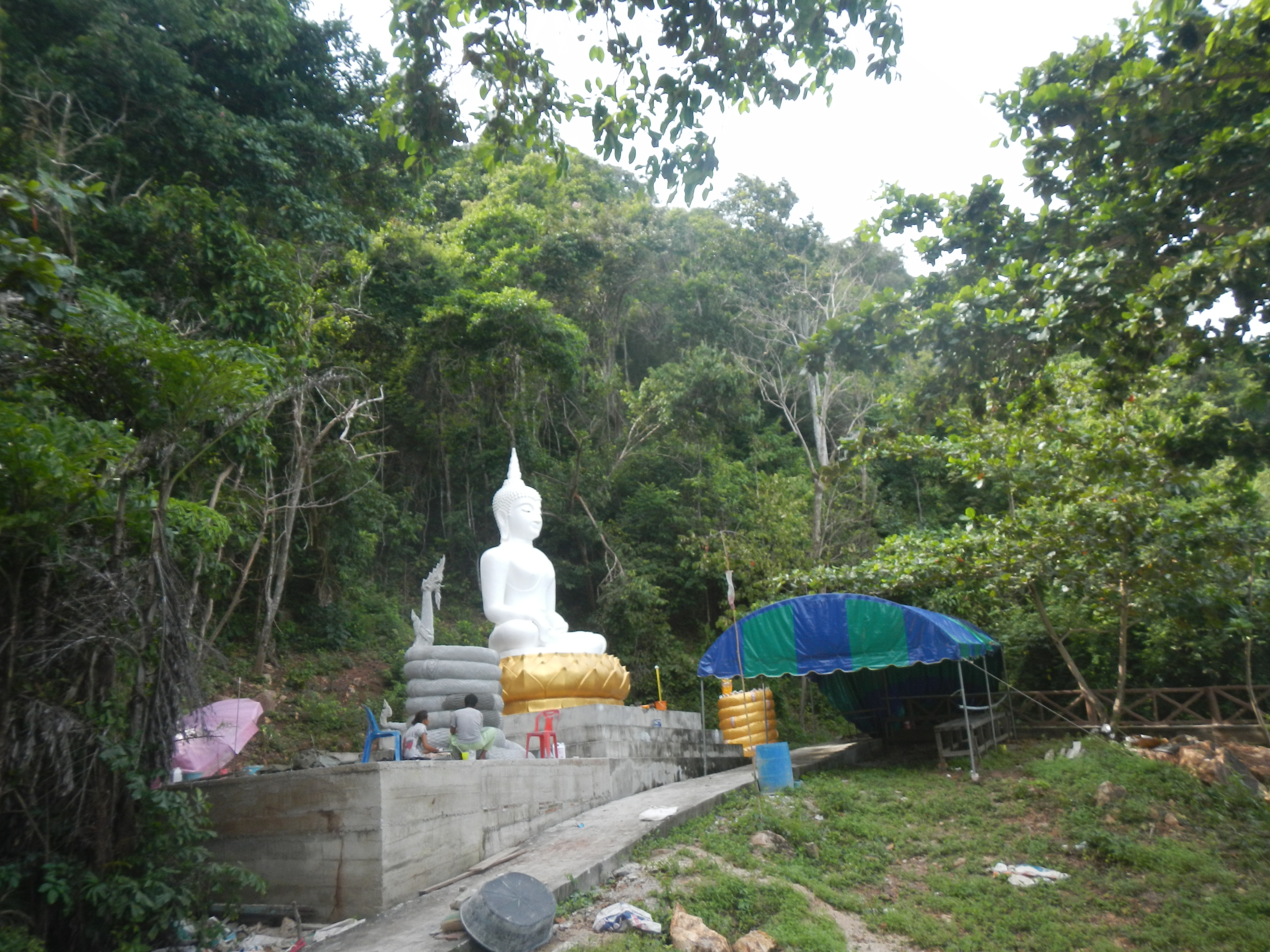
Statue

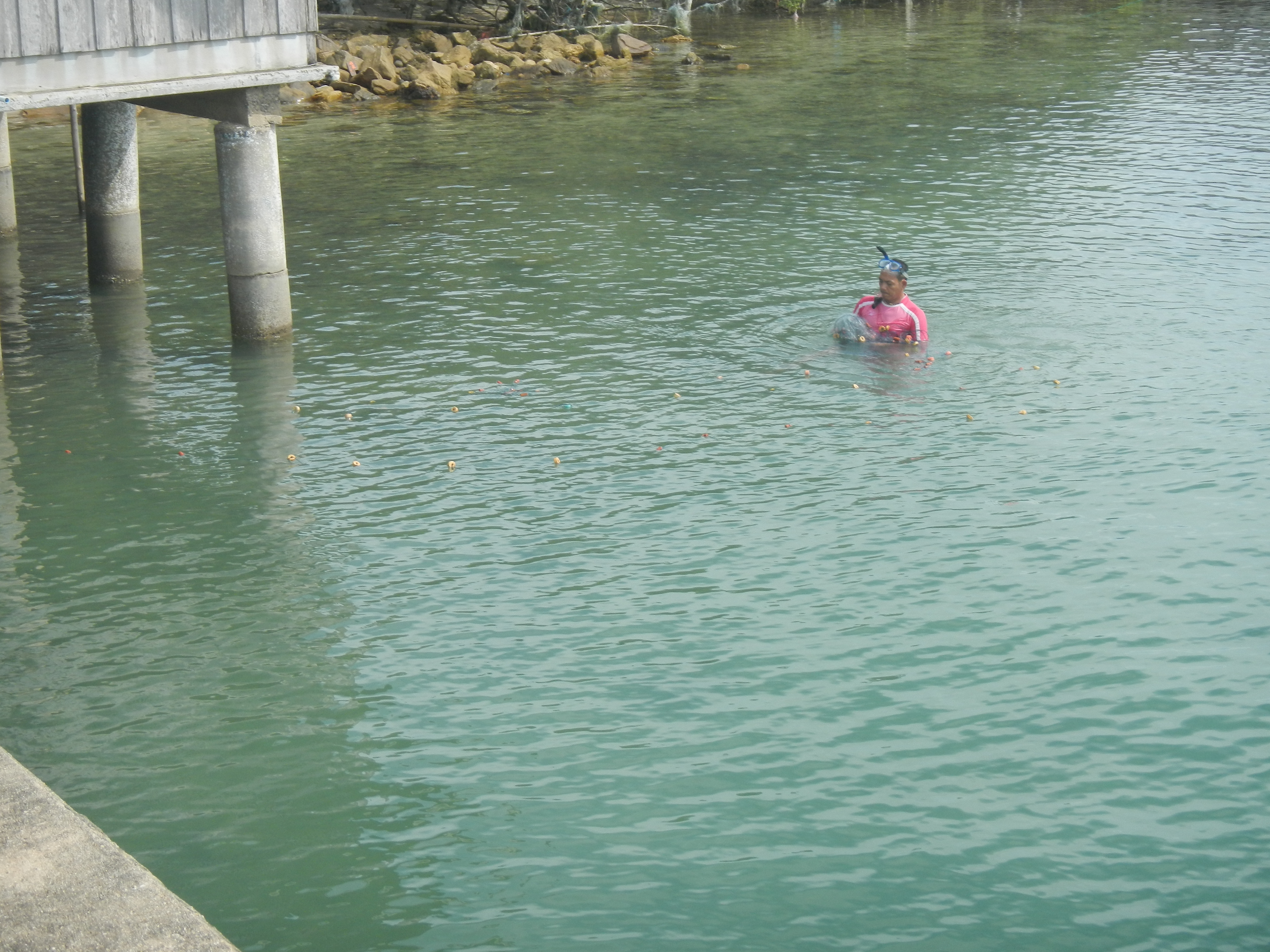
Diving and fishing

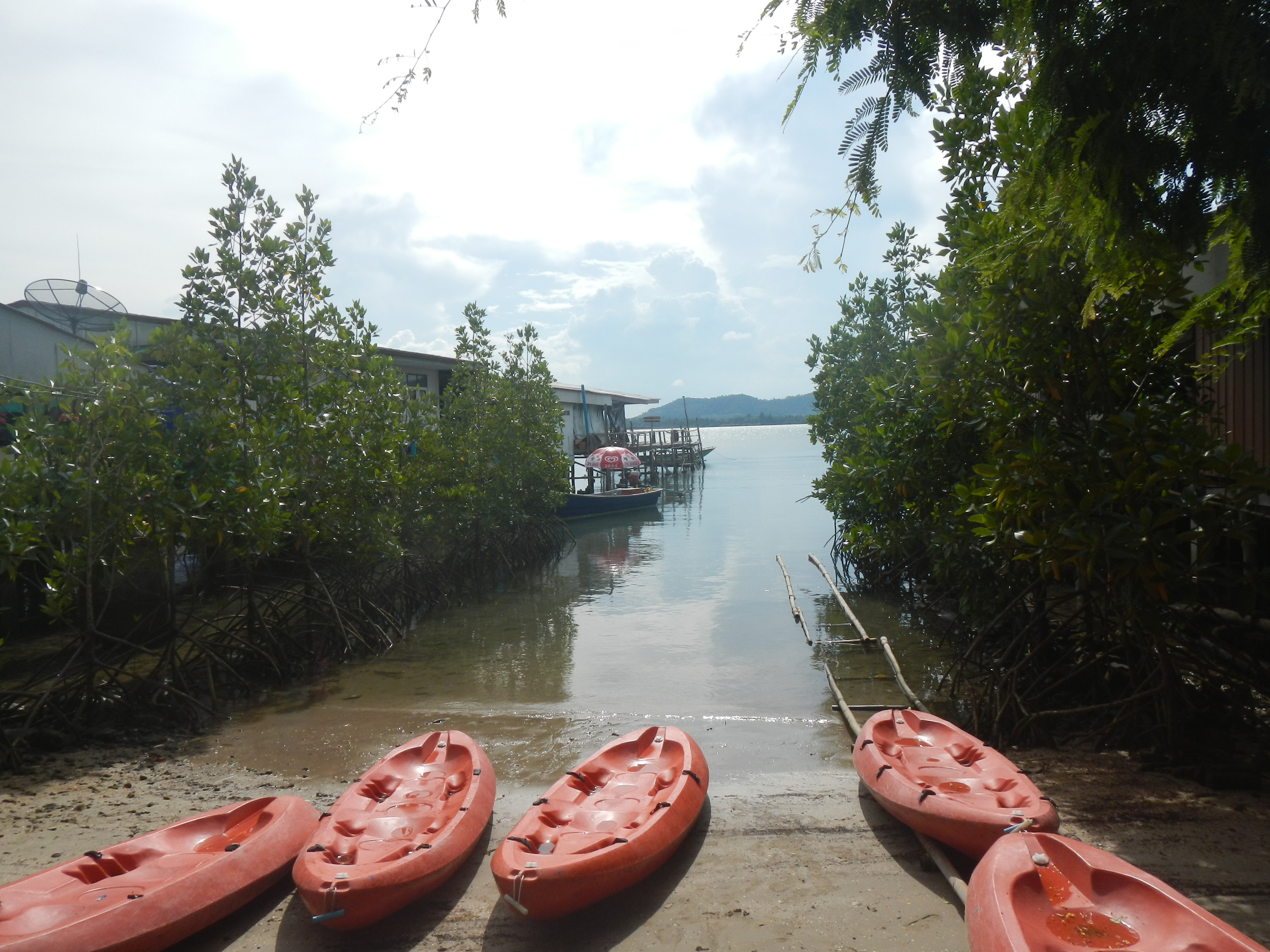
Kayak

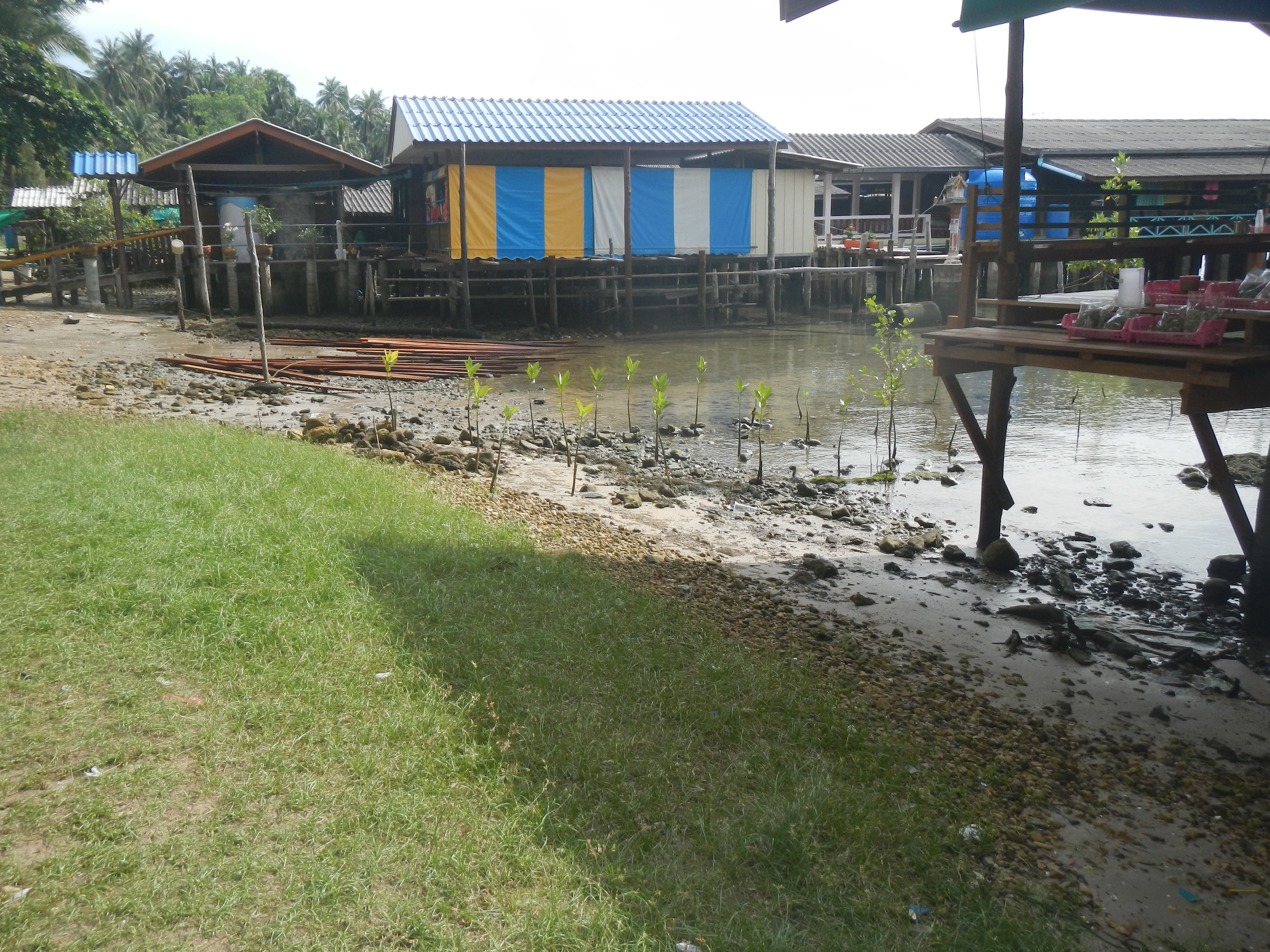
Planting

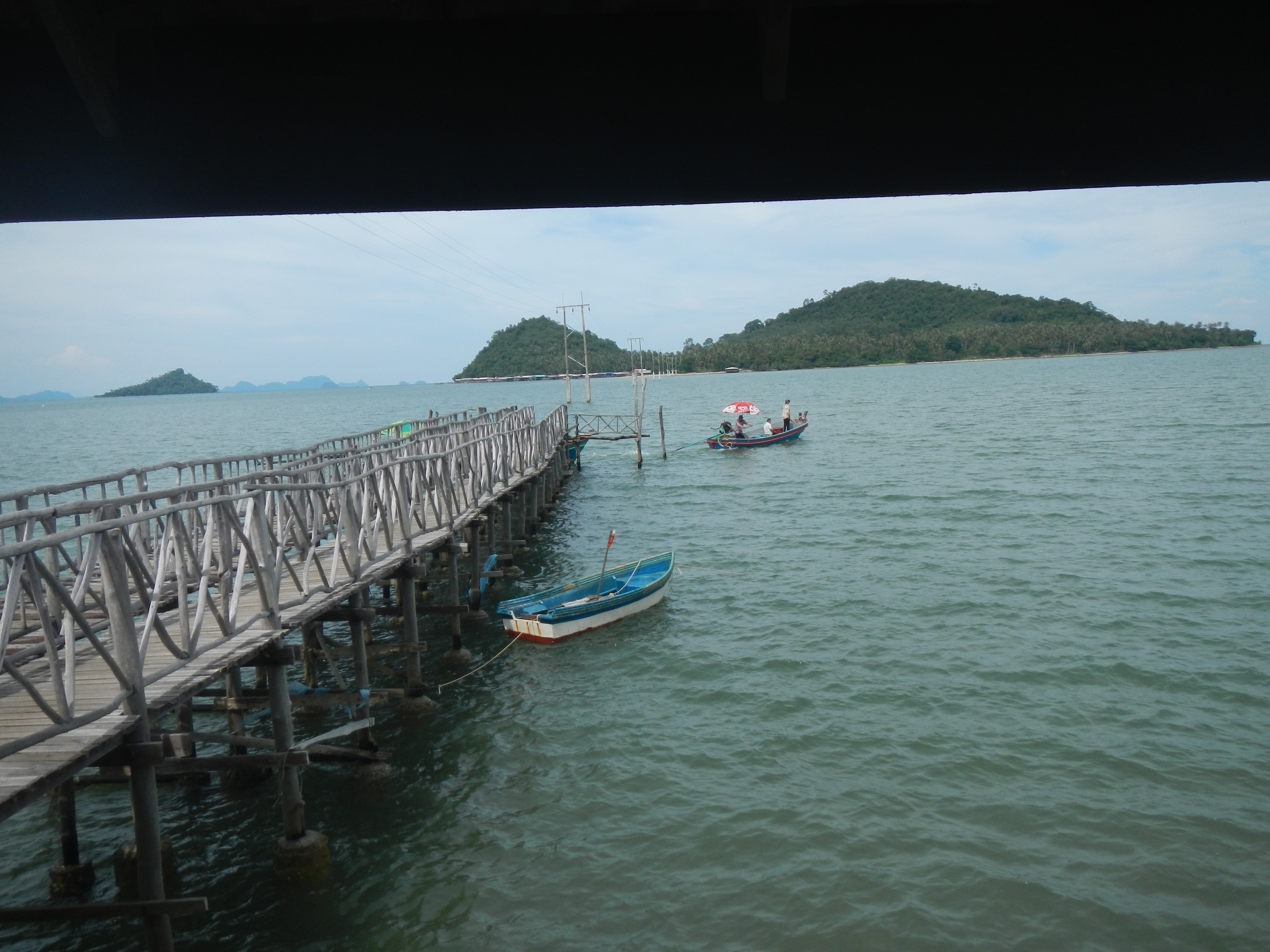
Seaport

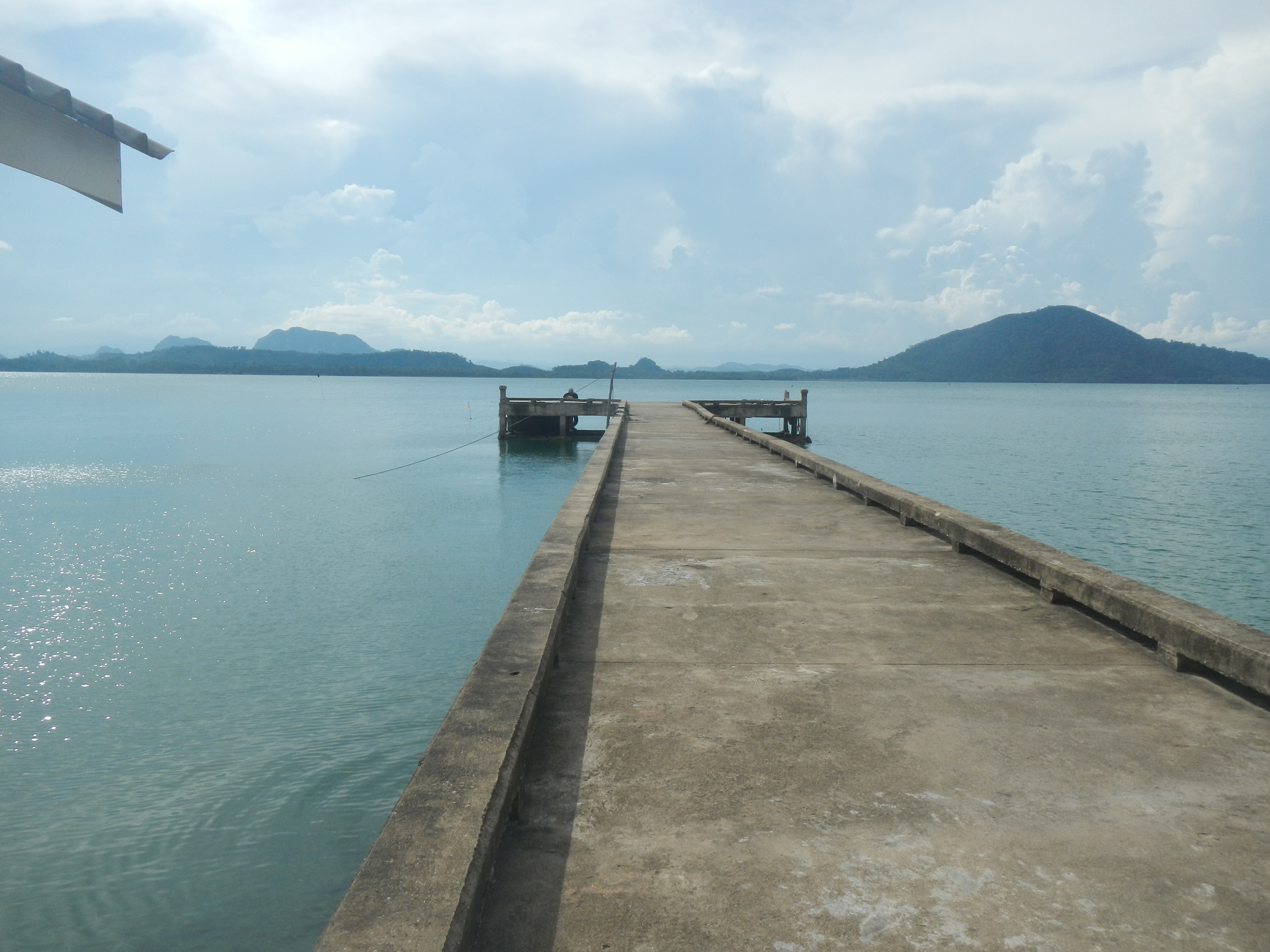
Seaport

== See also ==
- List of islands of Thailand
