= Lang Suan district =

Lang Suan หลังสวน
- District
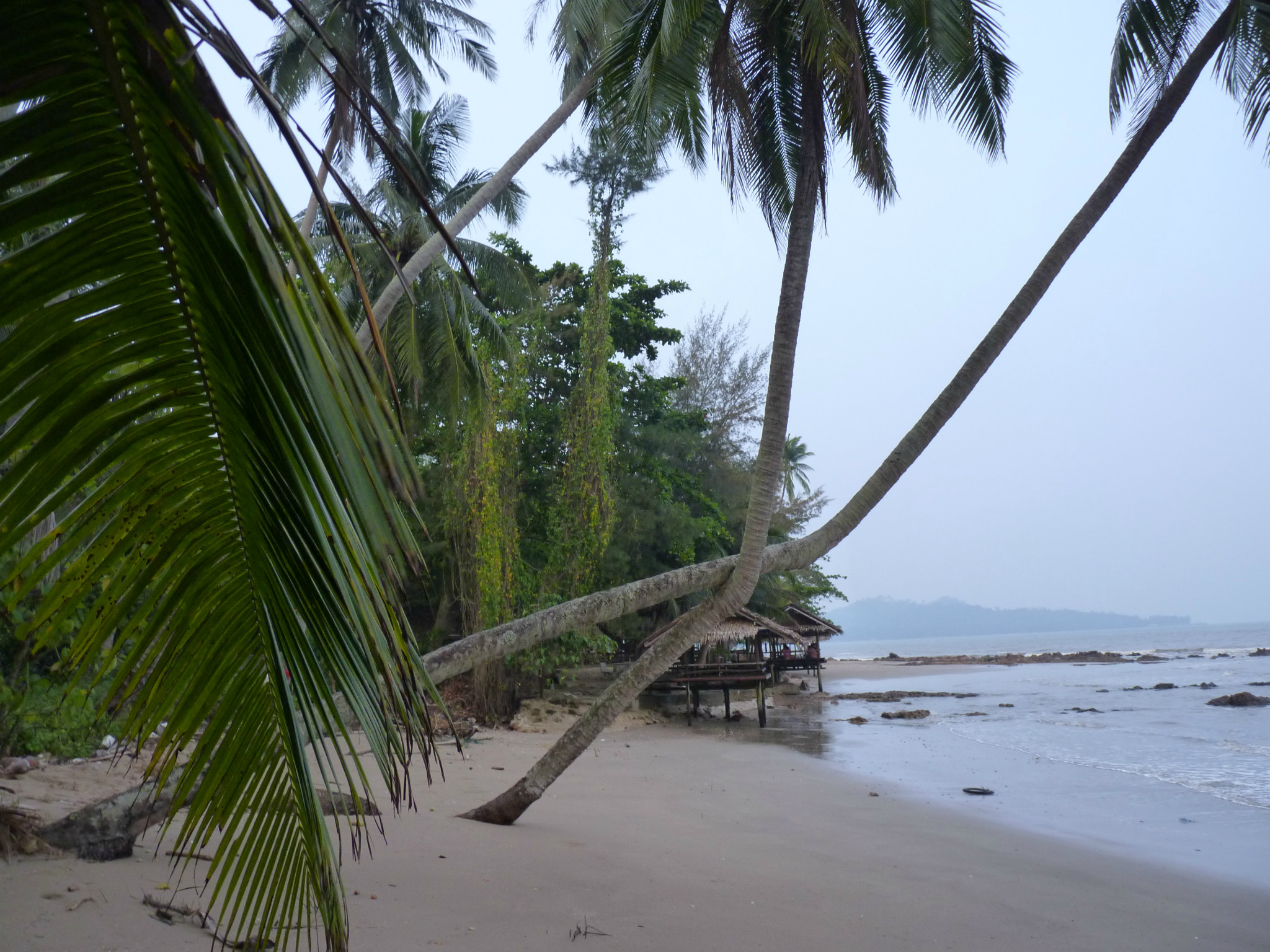
- Beach at Bang Nam Chuet

- District location in Chumphon province
- Coordinates: 9°56′44″N 99°4′43″E
- Country: Thailand
- Province: Chumphon
- Seat: Khan Ngoen

Area
  - Total: 935.0 km^{2} (361.0 sq mi)

Population (2007)
  - Total: 70,837
  - Density: 75.8/km^{2} (196/sq mi)
- Time zone: UTC+7 (ICT)
- Postal code: 86110
- Geocode: 8604

Lang Suan (Thai: หลังสวน, pronounced [lǎŋ sǔa̯n]) is a district (amphoe) of Chumphon province, southern Thailand.

== History ==
Lang Suan was originally a mueang reporting directly to Bangkok. During the Thesaphiban reforms at the end of the 19th century it was put under monthon Chumphon. On 29 April 1917 the district's name was changed from Mueang Lang Suan to Khan Ngein (ขันเงิน). On 1 April 1932 the province was abolished and its districts were incorporated into Chumphon province. On 14 November 1938 the district's name was changed to Lang Suan (หลังสวน).

== Geography ==
Neighboring districts are (from the south clockwise) Lamae and Phato of Chumphon Province, La-un of Ranong province, and Sawi and Thung Tako of Chumphon. To the east is the Gulf of Thailand.

The main river of the district is the Lang Suan.

The island of Ko Phithak is located at the northern end of the district.

== Administration ==
The district is divided into 13 sub-districts (tambons), which are further subdivided into 147 villages (mubans). The town (thesaban mueang) Lang Suan includes the tambon Lang Suan and parts of Khan Ngoen, Pho Daeng, Laem Sai, and Wang Tako. The sub-district municipality (thesaban tambon) Paknam Lang Suan includes tambon Pak Nam. There are a further 12 tambon administrative organizations (TAO).

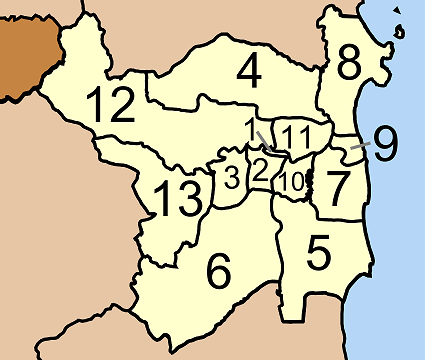
Map of districts

No.	Name	Thai	Villages	Pop.
1.	Lang Suan	หลังสวน	-	3,914
2.	Khan Ngein	ขันเงิน	7	7,460
3.	Tha Maphla	ท่ามะพลา	9	3,090
4.	Na Kha	นาขา	13	7,768
5.	Na Phaya	นาพญา	19	5,017
6.	Ban Khuan	บ้านควน	17	7,859
7.	Bang Maphrao	บางมะพร้าว	14	4,628
8.	Bang Nam Chuet	บางน้ำจืด	14	4,851
9.	Paknam	ปากน้ำ	6	6,843
10.	Pho Daeng	พ้อแดง	10	2,237
11.	Laem Sai	แหลมทราย	12	3,694
12.	Wang Tako	วังตะกอ	13	7,285
13.	Hat Yai	หาดยาย	13	6,191
