= Monthon =

Former country subdivision of Thailand

Administrative Division of Siam in 1900

Monthon (Thai: มณฑล), also known as Monthon Thesaphiban (Maṇḍala Dēśābhipāla; Mṇṯhl Theṣ̄āp̣hibāl; Thai: มณฑลเทศาภิบาล, lit. 'circle of local government'), were administrative subdivisions of Thailand at the beginning of the 20th century. The Thai word monthon is a translation of the word mandala (maṇḍala, literally "circle"), in its sense of a type of political formation. The monthon were created as a part of the Thesaphiban (เทศาภิบาล, literally "local government") bureaucratic administrative system, introduced by Prince Damrong Rajanubhab which, together with the monthon, established step-by-step today's present provinces (changwat), districts (amphoe), and communes (tambon) throughout Thailand. Each monthon was led by a royal commissioner called Thesaphiban (เทศาภิบาล), later renamed to Samuhathesaphiban (สมุหเทศาภิบาล). The system was officially adopted by the 1897 Local Administration Act, after some monthon had been established and administrative details were sorted out.

== History ==
The Establishment of Monthons in 1893

Before the Thesaphiban reforms, the country consisted of partially independent cities called mueang, some directly subordinate to the capital, some subordinate to larger mueang, or to one or more of the tributary kingdoms. Before the reforms, governors inherited their posts from their family lineage, and lived on taxes they collected in their area, a practice formally called tax farming. These were converted from hereditary governors to appointed governmental posts, as had been done by Chinese Yuan, Ming, and Qing-era rulers in first recognizing Tusi (tribal leaders) as imperial officials, then replacing them with imperial appointees. The arrangement resulted in governors being appointed and paid by the central government, and mueang developed into provinces. An essential step in the ending of tax farming was the creation on 3 September 1885 of the Royal Survey Department. Though its first fruits were not obtained until 1901, the department's cadastral surveys, i.e., surveys of specific land parcels, made possible the defining of ownership for land registration and equitable taxation. The term changwat (จังหวัด) for the provinces was first used in 1907 for the provinces in Monthon Pattani, and by 1916 had come into general use.

== Resistance to reform ==
It took till around 1910 to implement the system throughout the country. The main reason for the slow implementation was the lack of suitably educated officials, but also the resistance of the traditional local leaders, which recalled the 1768–1770 resistance of the monk Chao Phra Faang to Thonburi reestablishment of Siamese authority. In 1902 along both banks of the Mekong, local revolts (Prakottakan Phi Bun ปรากฏการณ์ผีบุญ) led by charismatic religious leaders called holy man or phi bun (ผีบุญ) broke out. The most serious of these was led by east-bank rebel Ong Keo against French authority in the former Thai tributary kingdom of Champasak. On the west bank in the area of Ubon Ratchathani, a less-well known former monk and phi bun headed a millenarian sect inspired by his apocalyptic prophecies, which spread fear, uncertainty and doubt among almost all the peoples along both banks of the river. The Bangkok government put down west bank resistance with little use of force, and cooperated with French Indochina officials insofar as limiting Thai authority to the west bank, later called Isan. East bank resistance however had no definitive end and became subsumed into the Second Indochina War. Far from the Mekong, resistance to reform continued into the 21st century in the Southern Thailand insurgency.

== Further development ==
In 1915 there were 19 monthons containing 72 provinces. Due to economic problems, several monthon were merged in 1925. Monthon Phetchabun had been dissolved in 1915. Only 14 monthon remained: Ayutthaya, Bangkok (Krung Thep), Chanthaburi, Nakhon Chaisi, Nakhon Ratchasima, Nakhon Sawan, Nakhon Si Thammarat, Pattani, Phayap, Phitsanulok, Phuket, Prachinburi, Ratchaburi, and Udon Thani. In 1932 another four were abolished: Chanthaburi, Nakhon Chaisi, Nakhon Sawan, and Pattani. Finally in 1933 the whole monthon system was abolished by the Provincial Administration Act 2476 B.E./A.D. 1933, part of the changes made after the coup d'état, which changed from an absolute to a constitutional monarchy, and the 70 provinces to second-level administrative divisions.

== List of monthons ==
Monthon	มณฑล	Established	Fate	Constituent Provinces and Polities
Lao Klang	ลาวกลาง	1890	1893 - renamed Monthon Nakhon Ratchasima	1. Buriram (joined 1891); 2. Chonnabot; 3. Nakhon Ratchasima; 4. Nang Rong (joined 1891); 5. Phetchabun; 6. Phu Khiao; 7. Phu Wiang (until 1891); abolished 8. Pra Khon Chai (joined 1891); 9. Wichianburi
Lao Tawan Ok	ลาวตะวันออก	1890	1891 - merged with Monthon Lao Tawan Ok Chiang Nua becoming Monthon Lao Kao	1. Ubon; 2. Khemmarat; 3. Yasothon; 4. Suwannaphum; 5. Roi Et; 6. Kalasin; 7. Phu Len Chang; 8. Sisaket; 9. Wang; 10. Phin; 11. Chepon
Lao Tawan Ok Chiang Nua	ลาวตะวันออกเฉียงเหนือ	1890	1891 - merged with Monthon Lao Tawan Ok becoming Monthon Lao Kao	1. Kingdom of Champassak; 2. Chiang Taeng; 3. Saen Pang; 4. Sitandon; 5. Khamtong Luang; 6. Salawan; 7. Attapeu; 8. Det Udom; 9. Khukhan; 10. Surin; 11. Sangkha
Lao Phuan	ลาวพวน	1890	1893 - renamed Monthon Udon after ceding the west bank of the Mekong.	1. Nong Khai; 2. Chiang Khouang; 3. Kamuttasai; 4. Lom Sak; 5. Khon Kaen; 6. Khon San; 7. Phon Phisai; 8. Chaiburi; 9. Nong Han; 10. Sakon Nakhon; 11. Tha Uthen; 12. Borikhan Nikhom; 13. Kham Kert; 14. Kham Muen; 15. Nakhon Panom; 16. Mukdahan; 17. Buriram (until 1891); 18. Nang Rong (until 1891)
Lao Kao	ลาวกาว	1891	1893 - renamed Monthon Isan	1. Kingdom of Champassak (until 1893); downgraded into a province 2. Kalasin; 3. Maha Sarakham; 4. Kamalasai; 5. Phu Len Chang; 6. Roi Et; 7. Suwannaphum; 8. Yasothon; 9. Khemmarat; 10. Ubon Ratchathani; 11. Sisaket; 12. Khukhan; 13. Sangkha; 14. Surin; 15. Det Udom; 16. Salawan (until 1893); 17. Attapeu (until 1893); 18. Saen Pang (until 1893); 19. Sitandon (until 1893); 20. Chiang Taeng (until 1893)
Lao Phung Khao	ลาวพุงขาว	1893	1893 - abolished, due to the annexation of territory to French Third Republic	1. Kingdom of Luang Phrabang; 2. Principality of Phongsali
Lao Chiang	ลาวเฉียง	1893	1900 - renamed into Monthon Tawan Ok Chiang Neua	1. Kingdom of Chiang Mai; 2. Principality of Lamphun; 3. Principality of Lampang; 4. Principality of Nan; 5. Principality of Phrae; 6. Principality of Thoen
Krung Kao	กรุงเก่า	1893	1933 - abolished, abolishment of the monthon system	Establishing Provinces: 1. Inburi; 2. Singburi; 3. Phromburi; 4. Lopburi; 5. Krung Kao; Nakhon Sawan Merger: 1. Nakhon Sawan; 2. Chai Nat; 3. Kamphaeng Phet; 4. Manorom; 5. Phayuha Khiri; 6. Sankhaburi; 7. Tak; 8. Uthai Thani; Krung Thep Merger: 1. Phra Nakhon; 2. Thon Buri; 3. Nonthaburi; 4. Pathum Thani; 5. Nakhon Khuean Khan (until 1932); 6. Samut Prakan; 7. Thanyaburi (until 1932); 8. Min Buri (until 1932); 9. Pathum Thani
Prachinburi	ปราจิณบุรี	1893	1933 - abolished, abolishment of the monthon system	Establishing Provinces: 1. Prachinburi; 2. Nakhon Nayok; 3. Chachoengsao; 4. Phanat Nikhom (until 1898); merged into Bang Pla Soi; 5. Bang Pla Soi (renamed in 1938); renamed Chonburi; 6. Bang Lamung (until 1901); merged into Bang Pla Soi; 7. Rayong (until 1906); 8. Chanthaburi (until 1906); 9. Khlung (until 1906); 10. Trat (until 1906); 11. Prachan Khiri Khet (until 1906); 12. Kabunburi (until 1926); merged into Prachinburi; Chanthaburi Merger: 1. Chanthaburi; 2. Rayong; 3. Khlung (until 1906); abolished 4. Trat (joined 1906)
Khamen	เขมร	1893	1899 - renamed Monthon Burapha	1. Sisophon; 2. Phanom Sok; 3. Siemmarat; 4. Phra Tabong
Nakhon Ratchasima	นครราชสีมา	1893	1933 - abolished, abolishment of the monthon system	Establishing Provinces: 1. Nakhon Ratchasima; 2. Buriram; 3. Chonnabot; 4. Phetchabun (until 1900); 5. Phu Khiao (until 1899); merged into Chonnabot; 6. Wichianburi (until 1907); Roi Et Merger: 1. Roi Et; 2. Kalasin; Ubon Merger: 1. Ubon Ratchathani; 2. Khukhan; 3. Surin
Isan	อีสาน	1893	1912 - partitioned into Monthon Roi Et and Monthon Ubon	1. Nakhon Champassak; 2. Kalasin; 3. Maha Sarakham; 4. Kamalasai; 5. Phu Len Chang (until 1902); merged into Kalasin; 6. Roi Et; 7. Suwannaphum (until 1908); merged into Roi Et; 8. Yasothon; 9. Khemmarat; 10. Ubon Ratchathani; 11. Sisaket; 12. Khukhan; 13. Sangkha; 14. Surin; 15. Det Udom
Phitsanulok	พิษณุโลก	1894	1933 - abolished, abolishment of the monthon system	Establishing Provinces: 1. Phitsanulok; 2. Phichai; 3. Phichit; 4. Sukhothai; 5. Sawankhalok; Phetchabun Merger: 1. Phetchabun; 2. Lom Sak (until 1931); merged into Phetchabun
Nakhon Sawan	นครสวรรค์	1895	1932 - merged into Monthon Krung Kao - Ayutthaya	1. Nakhon Sawan; 2. Chai Nat; 3. Kamphaeng Phet; 4. Manorom; 5. Phayuha Khiri; 6. Sankhaburi; 7. Tak; 8. Uthai Thani
Ratchaburi	ราชบุรี	1895	1933 - abolished, abolishment of the monthon system	Establishing Provinces: 1. Ratchaburi; 2. Kanchanaburi; 3. Samut Songkhram; 4. Phetchaburi; 5. Prachuap Khiri Khan; Nakhon Chai Si Merger: 1. Nakhon Chai Si; 2. Samut Sakhon; 3. Suphan Buri
Nakhon Chai Si	นครไชยศรี	1895	1932 - merged into Monthon Ratchaburi	1. Nakhon Chai Si; 2. Samut Sakhon; 3. Suphan Buri
Chumphon	ชุมพร	1896	1925 - merged into Monthon Nakhon Si Thammarat	1. Chumphon; 2. Chaiya (until 1915); merged into Kanchanadit; 3. Kanchanadit; 4. Lang Suan
Nakhon Si Thammarat	นครศรีธรรมราช	1896	1933 - abolished, abolishment of the monthon system	1. Nakhon Si Thammarat; 2. Phatthalung; 3. Songkhla; 4. Nong Chik (until 1906); 5. Pattani (until 1906); 6. Yaring (until 1906); 7. Yala (until 1906); 8. Raman (until 1906); 9. Ra'Ngae (until 1906); 10. Saiburi (until 1906); 11. Kalantan (until 1906); 12. Trangkanu (until 1906); 13. Bersut (until 1899); merged into Trangkanu; Pattani Merger: 1. Pattani; 2. Yala; 3. Narathiwat; Chumphon Merger: 1. Chumphon; 2. Kanchanadit; 3. Lang Suan (until 1932); merged into Chumphon
Syburi	ไทรบุรี	1897	1909 - abolished, due to the annexation of territory to British Empire	1. Kedah; 2. Perlis; 3. Satun
Krung Thep	กรุงเทพ	1897	1922 - merged into Monthon Krung Kao - Ayutthaya	1. Phra Nakhon; 2. Thon Buri; 3. Nonthaburi; 4. Pathum Thani; 5. Nakhon Khuean Khan; 6. Samut Prakan; 7. Thanyaburi (joined 1902); 8. Min Buri (joined 1901); 9. Pathum Thani
Phuket	ภูเก็จ	1898	1933 - abolished, abolishment of the monthon system	1. Phuket; 2. Satun (joined 1909); 3. Ranong; 4. Phang Nga; 5. Takua Pa; 6. Krabi
Phetchabun	เพชรบูรณ์	1899 1907	1903 - merged into Monthon Phitsanulok 1916 - merged into Monthon Phitsanulok	1. Lom Sak; 2. Phetchabun
Burapha	บูรพา	1899	1906 - abolished, due to the annexation of territory to French Third Republic	1. Sisophon; 2. Phanom Sok; 3. Siemmarat; 4. Phra Tabong
Tawan Ok Chiang Neua	ตะวันตกเฉียงเหนือ	1900	1901 - renamed into Monthon Phayap	1. Chiang Mai; 2. Lamphun; 3. Lampang; 4. Phrae; 5. Thoen; 6. Nan
Phayap	พายัพ	1901	1933 - abolished, abolishment of the monthon system	1. Chiang Mai; 2. Chiang Rai (joined 1910); 3. Lamphun; 4. Lampang; 5. Phrae; 6. Thoen; 7. Nan
Udon	อุดร	1901	1933 - abolished, abolishment of the monthon system	1. Nong Khai; 2. Kamuttasai; 3. Lom Sak (until 1899); 4. Loei (joined 1899); partitioned from Lom Sak; 5. Khon Kaen; 6. Phon Phisai (until 1906); 7. Chaiburi (until 1916); 8. Nong Han (until 1908); merged into Udon Thani; 9. Udon Thani (joined 1908); 10. Sakon Nakhon; 11. Tha Uthen (until 1907); 12. Nakhon Panom; 13. Mukdahan
Pattani	ปัตตานี	1906	1932 - merged into Monthon Nakhon Si Thammarat	1. Pattani; 2. Nong Chik (until 1906); merged into Pattani; 3. Yaring (until 1906); merged into Pattani; 4. Yala; 5. Raman (until 1906); merged into Yala; 6. Ra'Ngae (until 1909); merged into Narathiwat; 7. Saiburi (until 1932); abolished 8. Kalantan (until 1906); ceded 9. Trangkanu (until 1906); ceded 10. Narathiwat (joined 1909)
Chanthaburi	จันทบุรี	1906	1933 - merged into Prachinburi	1. Chanthaburi; 2. Rayong; 3. Khlung (until 1906); abolished 4. Trat (joined 1906)
Roi Et	ร้อยเอ็จ	1912	1932 - merged into Nakhon Ratchasima	1. Kalasin; 2. Maha Sarakham (until 1925); merged into Kalasin; 3. Kamalasai (until 1913); merged into Kalasin; 4. Roi Et
Ubon	อุบล	1912	1932 - merged into Nakhon Ratchasima	1. Yasothon (until 1912); merged into Ubon Ratchathani; 2. Khemmarat (until 1912); merged into Ubon Ratchathani; 3. Ubon Ratchathani; 4. Sisaket (until 1907); merged into Khukhan; 5. Khukhan; 6. Sangkha (until 1912); merged into Surin; 7. Surin; 8. Det Udom (until 1912); merged into Khukhan
Maharat	มหาราษฎร์	1915	1926 - merged into Monthon Phayap	1. Chiang Rai; 2. Lampang; 3. Phrae; 4. Nan

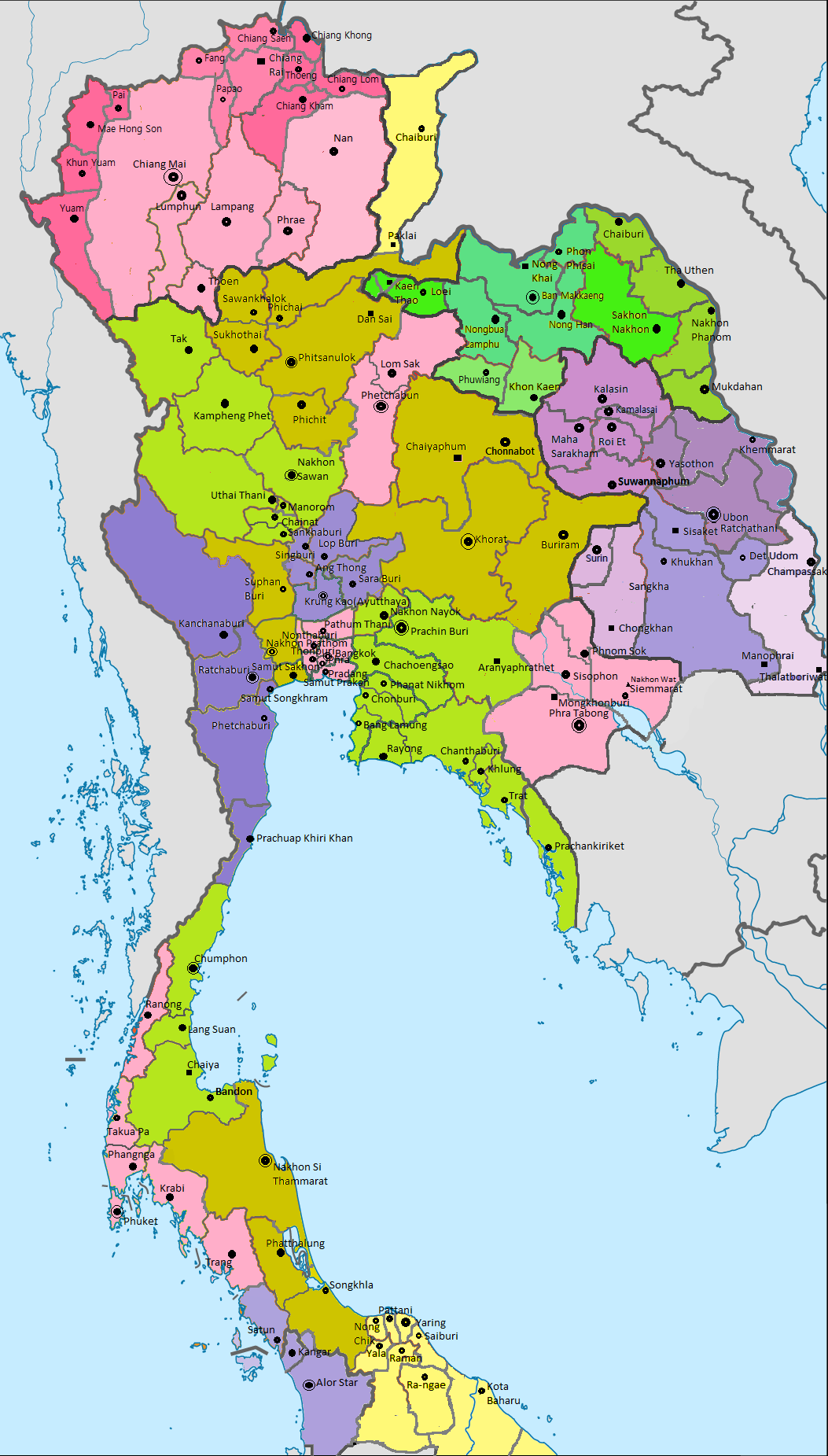
Boriwen Map

- Monthon Lao Chiang is the same as Monthon Phayap, to ease understanding in this table but in all cases, they are the same.
- Monthon Lao Kao which became Monthon Isan, and Monthon Lao Phuan which became Monthon Udon.
- The use of the name is up to interpretation and use on case by case basis, but name changes occurs due to Rama V integration policy of minorities and achieving assimilation.
- Province merger not shown, only monthon partition and merger are

== Boriwen ==
The larger monthon Phayap, Udon Thani, and Isan had an additional administrative level between monthon and provincial administration. Three to five boriwen (บริเวณ), each administered by a commissioner (khaluang boriwen, ข้าหลวงบริเวณ).

== See also ==
- Administrative divisions of Thailand
- Mandala (Southeast Asian political model)
- Mueang
- Native Chieftain System
- Past provinces of Thailand
- Royal Thai Survey Department
