= Lamae district =

Lamae ละแม
- District
- District location in Chumphon province
- Coordinates: 9°46′6″N 99°5′30″E
- Country: Thailand
- Province: Chumphon
- Seat: Lamae

Area
  - Total: 259.0 km^{2} (100.0 sq mi)

Population (2005)
  - Total: 27,278
  - Density: 105.3/km^{2} (273/sq mi)
- Time zone: UTC+7 (ICT)
- Postal code: 86170
- Geocode: 8605

Lamae (Thai: ละแม, pronounced [lā.mɛ̄ː]) is a district (amphoe) in the southern part of Chumphon province, southern Thailand.

== Geography ==
Neighboring districts are (from the south clockwise) Tha Chana of Surat Thani province, Phato and Lang Suan of Chumphon Province. To the east is the Gulf of Thailand.

== History ==
The minor district (king amphoe) was created on 1 July 1971, when the three tambons, Lamae, Thung Luang, and Suan Taeng, were split off from Lang Suan district. It was upgraded to a full district on 12 April 1977.

== Administration ==
The district is divided into four sub-districts (tambons), which are further subdivided into 47 villages (mubans). Lamae is a township (thesaban tambon) which covers parts of the same-named tambon. There are a further four tambon administrative organizations (TAO).

| No. | Name | Thai name | Villages | Pop. |
|---|---|---|---|---|
| 1. | Lamae | ละแม | 20 | 12,989 |
| 2. | Thung Luang | ทุ่งหลวง | 9 | 5,020 |
| 3. | Suan Taeng | สวนแตง | 10 | 4,382 |
| 4. | Thung Kha Wat | ทุ่งคาวัด | 8 | 4,887 |

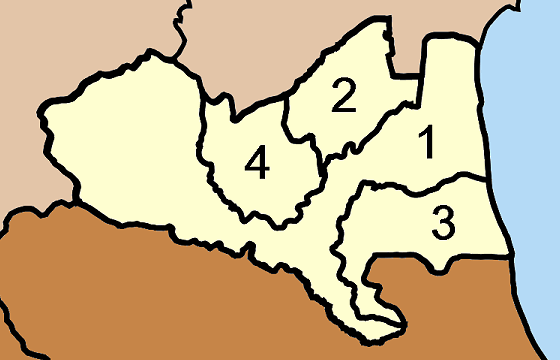
