= Khao Sam Kaeo =

Archaeological site in Chumphon province, Thailand

- เขาสามแก้ว (Thai)
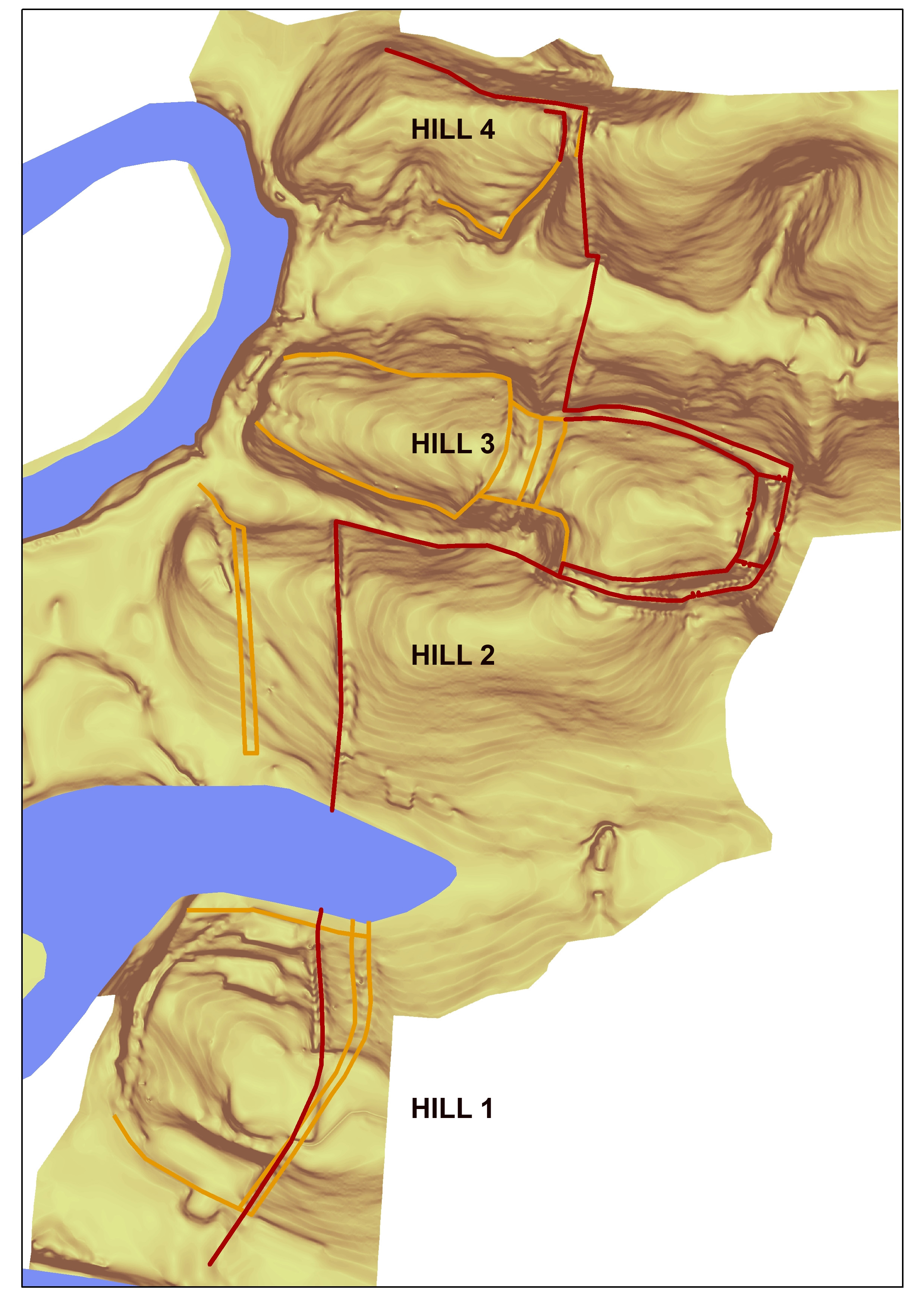
- Map of the site of Khao Sam Kaeo showing the four hills that make up the site. Red lines denote earthen walls at the site

- Location in Thailand
- Interactive map of Khao Sam Kaeo
- 10°31′38″N 99°10′55″E
- Type: Human settlement
- Periods: Ancient history
- Cultures: Proto-Dvaravati
- Associated with: Mon people
- Location: Mueang Chumphon district, Chumphon, Thailand

History
- Built: c. 400-100 BCE

Site notes
- Elevation: 650 m (2,130 ft)
- Area: 0.54 square kilometres (54 ha)
- Architectural style: Proto-Dvaravati
- Excavation dates: 2005
- Archaeologists: French National Centre for Scientific Research
- Condition: Partial restoration
- Owner: Public
- Management: Fine Arts Department, no entry fee
- Public access: Yes

Khao Sam Kaeo (Thai: เขาสามแก้ว) is an archaeological site in Thailand's Chumphon province. It is located in Na Cha-ang subdistrict of Mueang Chumphon district, just north of the town of Chumphon, on the east coast of the Malay Peninsula, at the Kra Isthmus. Dated 400–100 BCE, Khao Sam Kaeo served as an extremely important port, as well as a crossroads for Asian connection and interaction, as it sat between the cultural regions of the South China Sea and the Bay of Bengal. There is evidence that material had come from the South China Sea, the Philippines, and Taiwan—all part of the maritime silk road of the time—proving the important technological and cultural connections between the site and these locations. This not only reveals the fact that people from across Asia ended up in Khao Sam Kaeo, but it also supports the idea that there was a transfer of ideas. When reviewing the material culture found at Khao Sam Kaeo, the transfer of ideas and trans-Asian connection becomes abundantly clear, especially when looking at ceramics, stone adzes, pendants, and jewelry. Data and research also point to the idea that foreign craftsmen stayed for long periods of time at Khao Sam Kaeo. Pottery and stone works made in an Indian technical style yet supposedly made locally support this idea. Collectively, evidence regarding material culture, raw materials, and biological data support the idea that the connections made at Khao Sam Kaeo were more than just trade and diffusion.

== Settlement ==
Khao Sam Kaeo was settled around four hills, with most of the settlement being located on the hills as the lower areas were believed to have been subjected to periodic flooding. The western side of the site contains the Tha Tapao river. The eastern side contains mostly earth embankments that archaeologists working at the site have referred to as walls. Some of these have been determined as man-made and some have been interpreted, based on their structure, to be ramparts. The overall analysis of the site has shown that the people living in Khao Sam Kaeo used the natural geography of the area as part of their creation of walls and ditches, often working around the natural environment when building their structures. Near Wall 8 located along the eastern plateau of Hill 3, there contained occupational layers associated with iron-forging and then eventually the production of stone ornaments. Glass working areas have been found around the base of Hill 2 and the top of Hill 4. Unfortunately, it has been difficult for archaeologists to determine the use of wooden structures, as any signs of their use would have been eroded away from upper levels of the site.

Within the settlement, the same problem occurs. Heavy erosion and modern disturbances have made it difficult to find things in situ—in their original place. Despite this, two communal terraces have been located. One is located at the base of Hill 1 along with remains of two structures and some footpaths. Different occupation layers have also been discovered through the use of newer floor layers being added on top of old ones, with some of these layers showing remains of hearths and postholes (locations where wooden posts were placed for structures).

Only one substantiated burial has been found in relation to Khao Sam Kaeo. Along the northern edge of Valley 3, a funerary urn containing the cremated remains of two children has been found. The ages of these remains have been determined as 11–15 years old, and 0–2 years old. No additional information about these remains has been recorded.

== Trade ==
=== Significance as a cultural port ===
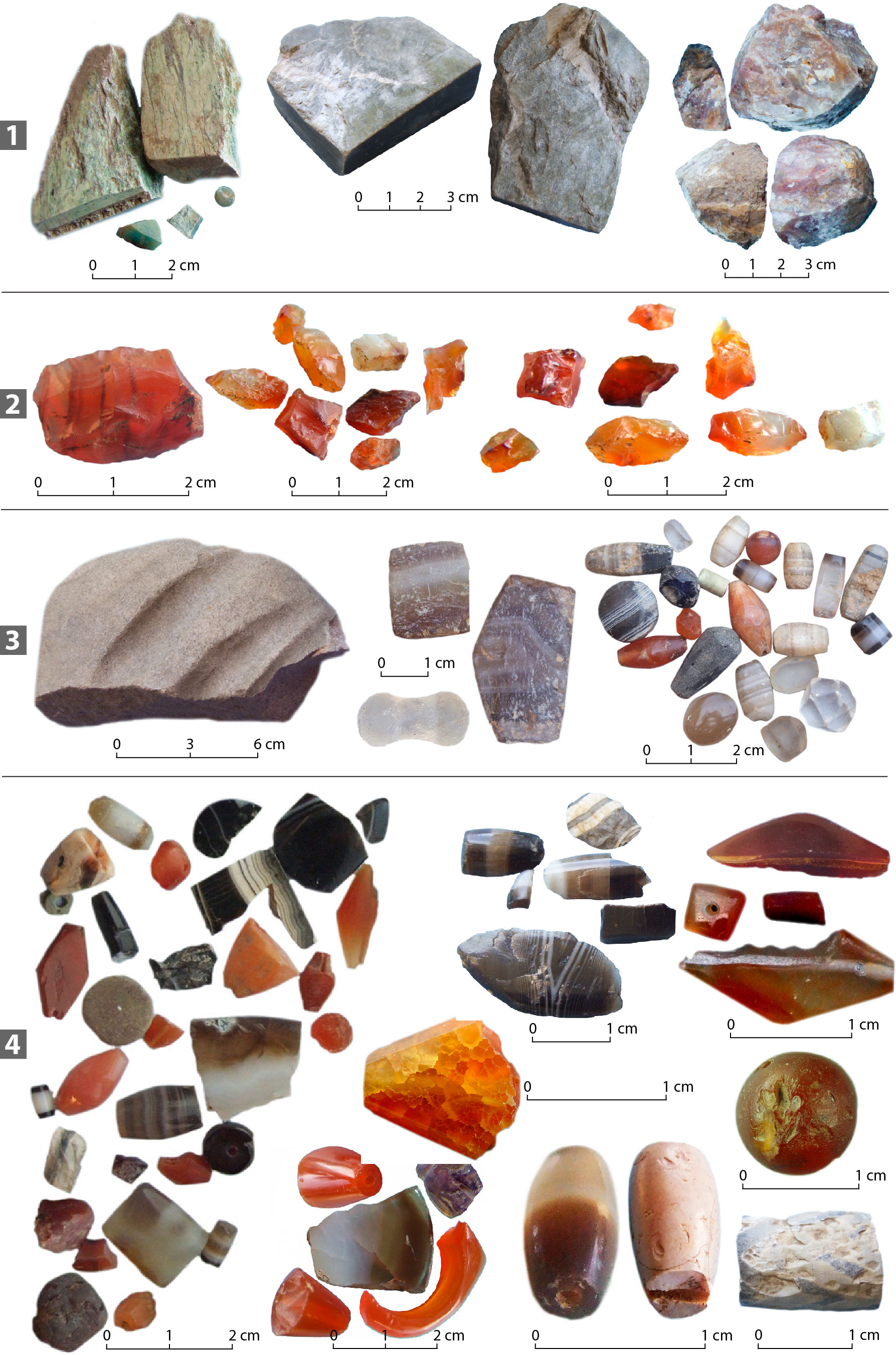
Beads found at Khao Sam Kaeo

Khao Sam Kaeo served as a major cross-cultural port and center for trade of goods, materials, and culture. Analysis of goods at the site reveals that trade was not sporadic, leading to the adoption of foreign technology or ideas, but a socially significant, multicultural long term interaction. A key characteristic of trade at Khao Sam Kaeo is the culturally significant adoption of technology at the local level. Evidence also points to the possibility the South Asian and South Asian trained artisans actually adapted their work to fulfill the demand by Southeast Asia. Copper metallurgical typologies found at the site reflect Vietnamese, Southern Asian, and Han technologies, revealing the importance of Khao Sam Kaeo as a center of trade triangulation.

Ceramic data reveal that techniques such as paddle impressions as well as polishing techniques found at the site have been linked to Sa-Huynh-Kalanay as well as the Philippines. Stone remains have also revealed the presence of foreign goods and raw materials from Taiwan and the Philippines. Complex connections between Khao Sam Khao and India can be seen through many technical wares as well as raw materials. Although some of the goods found in the archaeological record seem to have been foreign imports, many are produced with foreign techniques with local motifs. This complexifies the relationships between foreign influences and Khao Sam Kaeo. The relationships seemed to extend enough to create a long term impact upon local artisanship. The presence of goods crafted with local materials and foreign techniques also support the fact that foreign artisans stayed at Khao Sam Kaeo for periods of time. Trade at Khao Sam Khao extended beyond single interactions of import and export. Trade at this site included the trade of ideas, technology, and culture. Interactions between Southeast Asia and foreign cultures were highly complex, and showcased the non-colonial transfer of ideas.

=== Beads and glass ===
Beads at Khao Sam Kaeo provide deep insight into trade relations happening over time. Data regarding beads reveal contact between Khao Sam Kaeo and Mediterranean regions. Roman intaglios have been found, made of yellow carnelian, featuring carvings of Roman gods. Glass fragments, of cobalt blue, found at Khao Sam Kaeo also indicate Mediterranean trade presence.

A study done analyzing the chemical composition of glass beads at Khao Sam Kaeo reveal that there are multiple glass types and compositions found at the site. This suggests that the sources from which the beads were made came from different places, aiding in the idea of foreign practice at Khao Sam Kaeo, as well as high levels of trade. In general, the composition of the tested glass pieces revealed that the main colorant was composed of copper. The analysis also revealed that titanium was also present in all the samples taken across the sites. The connection and similarities between the glass piece composition highlights the importance of Khao Sam Kaeo as not only a crossroads for economics, but also art and culture. This further expands the potential importance of Khao Sam Kaeo to Thailand, and the rest of Southeast Asia.

== Metallurgy ==
=== Copper ===
When looking at copper based atrial culture found at Khao Sam Kaeo, there are three major metallurgical traditions: South Asian, Vietnamese, and Han Chinese traditions. Data also reveals that these artifacts were produced skillfully, and that the metalworkers at Khao Sam Kaeo had robust knowledge of multilateral metalworking. Based on a lack of evidence that copper was mined and smelted locally, the copper and copper-alloy items located at the site were most likely made from imported materials. Most of the copper-alloy artifacts found here have been decorated vessels and ornaments. Knobbed bowls with high levels of tin have been found. This typological form has been found throughout the Indian subcontinent, most prominently dating between the third and second centuries BCE, and indicate a transmission of ideas that made their way to Southeast Asia.

Along with metalwork being an important import, either regarding finished products or technology, Khao Sam Kaeo’s export power can be showcased well when looking at metal artifacts. Evidence reveals that metalworkers at Khao Sam Kaeo were producing high-tin bronze ingots for export as well as for production tools. These high-tin bronze artifacts reflected mainly ornamental purposes, with a wide range of cultural technologies. The way in which these metal pieces were produced reflects the idea that cross cultural technology was utilized for export production.

=== Iron ===
Currently, there is no evidence of iron ore deposits close to the site of Khao Sam Kaeo. However, there is evidence that iron smithing took place here as far back as 200 B.C. It is believed that any raw iron was likely obtained through trade. Over half of the iron artifacts found have been slag (metal waste created as a product of smelting and smithing). Despite many of the iron artifacts being damaged by corrosion, both tools and weapons have been discovered.

=== Gold ===
Gold has been found in the form of ornaments and beads. In particular, a gold foil technique has been found on beads from this site, as well as gold polyhedral beads. The polyhedral beads are stylistically similar to beads found in sites throughout Burma. Central knobbed gold beads found here share a resemblance to beads found in sites in southern Vietnam. A gold pendant was also found that resembles one found at Oc Eo.

== Glass technology ==
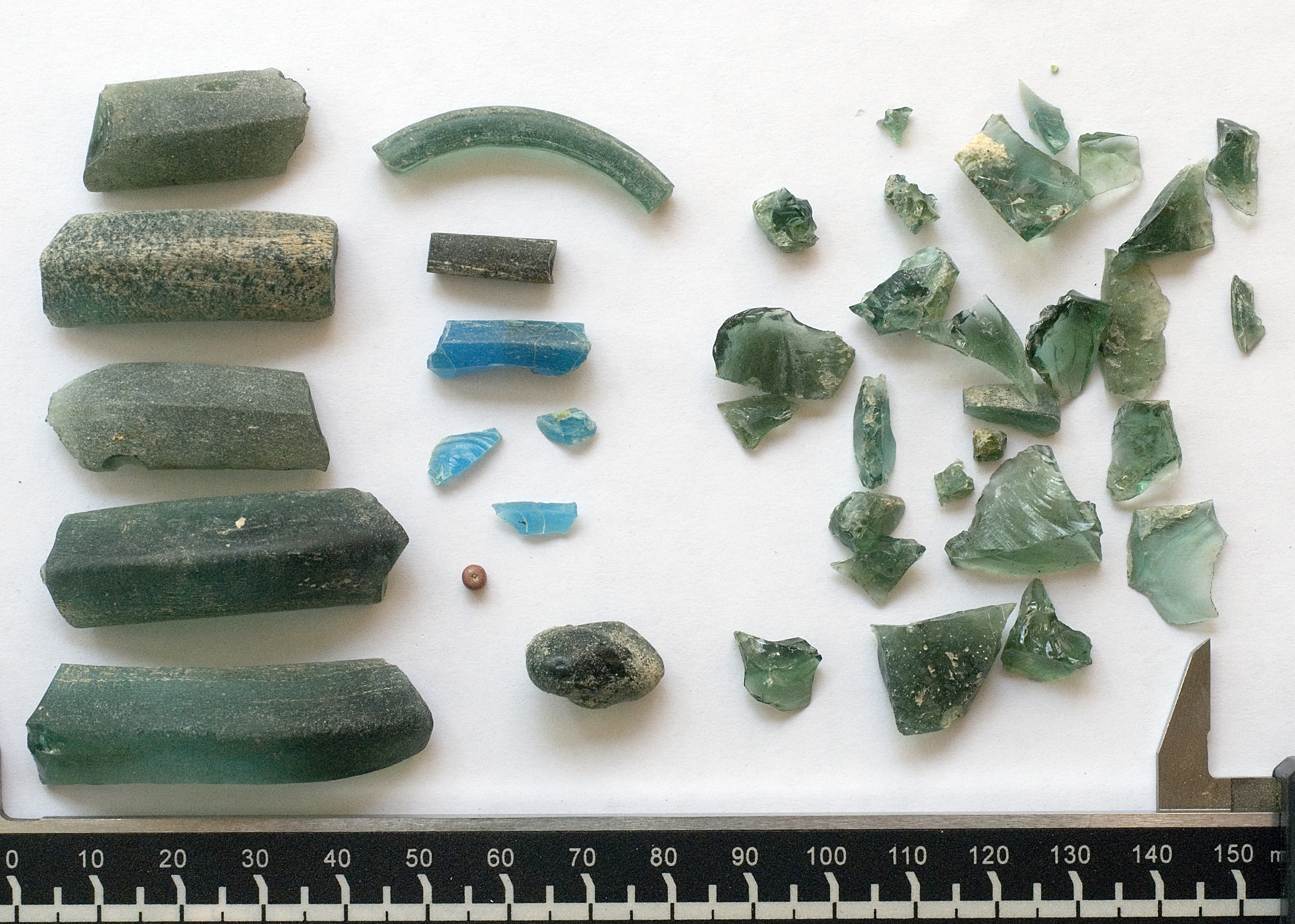
Glass artifacts found at Khao Sam Kaeo

Khao Sam Kaeo is a site that has provided a significant amount of evidence to show the development of methods and ideas related to glasswork. Beads made at this site have been found as far as the Philippines. Glasswork here is primarily that of beads and bracelets. Both hot-working and cold-working techniques were used, as well as a focus on a shaping technique called 'lapidary'. Many of the beads made at Khao Sam Kaeo are typically bigger than many of the "Indo-Pacific" beads found across South and Southeast Asia. Glass bracelets found at the site have been found in shades of green, red, and greenish-blue. Most of the glass waste found at Khao Sam Kaeo appears to come from the process of making the bracelets, as it required more work and technique to make.

Based on evidence found at the site, it appears that most of the glassworking techniques used at Khao Sam Kaeo were brought in from outside sources, as opposed to being established and refined locally. It would have taken sophisticated techniques to create the beads and bracelets found at the site, and as the earlier levels of the site do not provide evidence of the process of establishing technique, it is assumed that craftsmen from other places came to Khao Sam Kaeo and taught the locals their techniques. And, as stated previously, there is clear and abundant evidence that not only the glassworking techniques were brought in from outside sources, but that the materials used in the composition of the glass were also imported. Based on compositional analyses done on the glass at Khao Sam Kaeo and other sites located throughout Southeast Asia, it is suggested that there was at least some kind of exchange network of glass ornaments and raw materials between Khao Sam Kaeo and sites in Vietnam such as Giong Ca Vo and the Tabon Caves in Palawan.
