= Sawi district =

Sawi สวี
- District
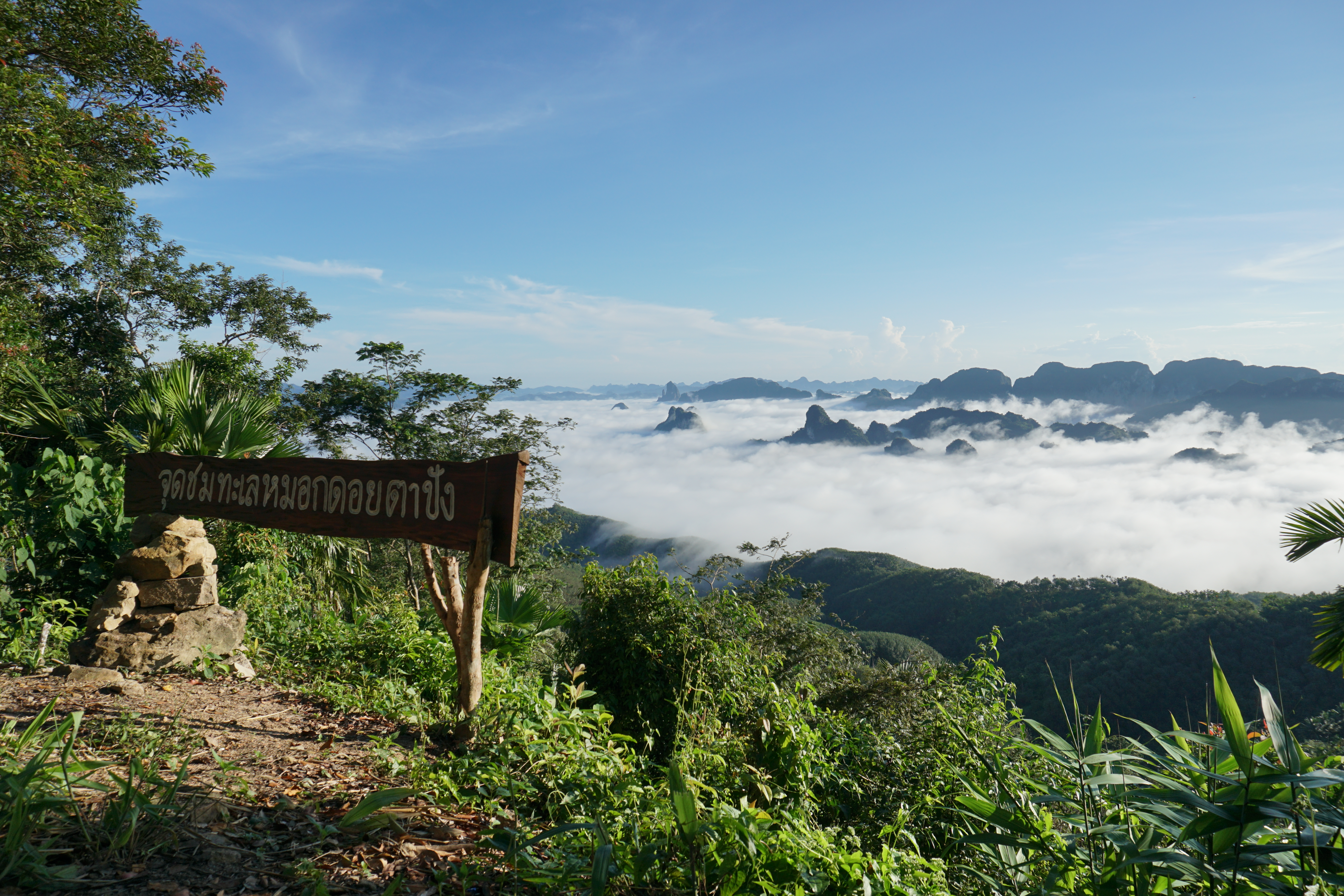
- Doi Tapang Sea of Mist Viewpoint, Khao Thalu, Sawi

- District location in Chumphon province
- Coordinates: 10°15′11″N 99°5′40″E
- Country: Thailand
- Province: Chumphon
- Seat: Sawi

Area
  - Total: 898.0 km^{2} (346.7 sq mi)

Population (2005)
  - Total: 69,340
  - Density: 77.2/km^{2} (200/sq mi)
- Time zone: UTC+7 (ICT)
- Postal code: 86130
- Geocode: 8607

Sawi (Thai: สวี, pronounced [sā.wǐː]) is a district (amphoe) in the central part of Chumphon province, southern Thailand.

== Geography ==
Neighboring districts are (from the south clockwise) Thung Tako and Lang Suan of Chumphon Province, La-un and Kra Buri of Ranong province and Mueang Chumphon of Chumphon Province. To the east is the Gulf of Thailand.

== History ==
The district dates back to Mueang Sawi, on the shore of the Sawi River. On 16 April 1897 a first district office was opened in village five of tambon Na Pho. After several relocations, the present office in village four of tambon Sawi was opened on 1 October 2001.

== Administration ==
The district is divided into 11 sub-districts (tambons), which are further subdivided into 114 villages (mubans). Na Pho is a township (thesaban tambon) which covers parts of the same-named tambon. There are a further 10 tambon administrative organizations (TAO).

No.	Name	Thai name	Villages	Pop.
1.	Na Pho	นาโพธิ์	8	7,943
2.	Sawi	สวี	4	2,654
3.	Thung Raya	ทุ่งระยะ	11	6,590
4.	Tha Hin	ท่าหิน	10	4,557
5.	Pak Phraek	ปากแพรก	6	1,538
6.	Dan Sawi	ด่านสวี	11	5,306
7.	Khron	ครน	14	9,090
8.	Wisai Tai	วิสัยใต้	10	5,225
9.	Na Sak	นาสัก	17	12,503
10.	Khao Thalu	เขาทะลุ	11	7,009
11.	Khao Khai	เขาค่าย	12	6,925

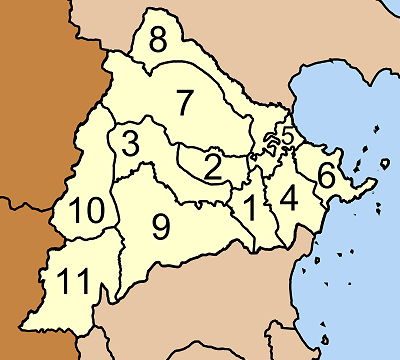
