= Thung Tako district =

Thung Tako ทุ่งตะโก
- District
- District location in Chumphon province
- Coordinates: 10°6′37″N 99°4′58″E
- Country: Thailand
- Province: Chumphon
- Seat: Thung Takhrai

Area
  - Total: 335.0 km^{2} (129.3 sq mi)

Population (2005)
  - Total: 23,535
  - Density: 70.3/km^{2} (182/sq mi)
- Time zone: UTC+7 (ICT)
- Postal code: 86220
- Geocode: 8608

Thung Tako (Thai: ทุ่งตะโก, pronounced [tʰûŋ tā.kōː]) is a district (amphoe) in the central part of Chumphon province, southern Thailand.

== Geography ==
Neighboring districts are (from the south clockwise) Lang Suan and Sawi of Chumphon Province. To the east is the Gulf of Thailand.

== History ==
The minor districts (king amphoe) was created on 6 September 1976, when then three tambons Thung Takhrai, Tako, and Pak Tako were split off from Sawi district. It was upgraded to a full district on 19 July 1991.

== Administration ==
The district is divided into four sub-districts (tambons), which are further subdivided into 35 villages (mubans). Pak Tako is a sub-district municipality (thesaban tambon) which covers the tambon of the same name. There are a further three tambon administrative organizations (TAO).

No.	Name	Thai name	Villages	Pop.
1.	Pak Tako	ปากตะโก	5	3,987
2.	Thung Takhrai	ทุ่งตะไคร	8	5,640
3.	Tako	ตะโก	14	8,412
4.	Chong Mai Kaeo	ช่องไม้แก้ว	8	5,496

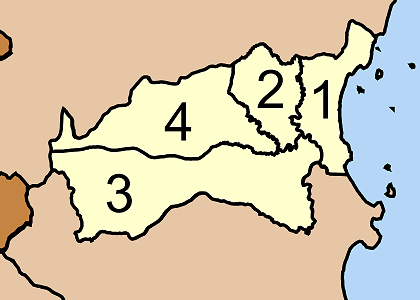
