= Monthon Surat =

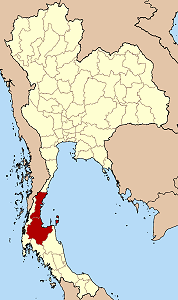
Map of Thailand highlighting the location of Monthon Surat Thani

Monthon Surat (Thai: มณฑลสุราษฎร์, originally named Monthon Chumphon มณฑลชุมพร) was an administrative subdivision of Thailand in the early 20th century. It covered the northeastern part of southern Thailand, including the present-day provinces of Surat Thani and Chumphon.

== History ==
The monthon was established in 1896, with its administration located in Chumphon, containing the provinces Chumphon, Chaiya, Kanchanadit, and Lang Suan. Kanchanadit was merged into Chaiya in 1899. In 1905 the monthon court was moved to the town Bandon. When the province Chaiya was renamed Surat Thani in 1915, the monthon was also renamed Surat. In 1926 it was incorporated into the Monthon Nakhon Si Thammarat.

== List of commissioners ==
- 1896–1901 Phraya Damrong Sutcharit (Khosimkong na Ranong)
- 1901–1905 Phraya Worasit Sewiwat (Taihak Phatthranawik)
- 1905–1913 Phraya Mahiban Borirak (Sawat Phumirat)
- 1913–1925 Phraya Borirak Phuthon (Phloi na Nakhon)
