= Lang Suan (town) =

Town in Chumphon province, Thailand

Coordinates: 9°57′N 99°04′E

Lang Suan (Thai: หลังสวน) is a town (thesaban mueang) in southern Thailand. As of 2006 it had a population of 11,822 and includes the entire sub-district (tambon) Lang Suan and parts of Khan Ngoen, Pho Daeng, Laem Sai, and Wang Tako, all within Lang Suan District.

== History ==
The township (thesaban tambon) Lang Suan was upgraded to town status on 20 February 2004.
