= Chumphon province =

Province of Thailand

Coordinates: 10°29′34″N 99°10′45″E

Chumphon ชุมพร
- Province

Other transcription(s)
  - Southern Thai: ชุมพร (pronounced [t͡ɕûm.pʰɔ̂ːn])
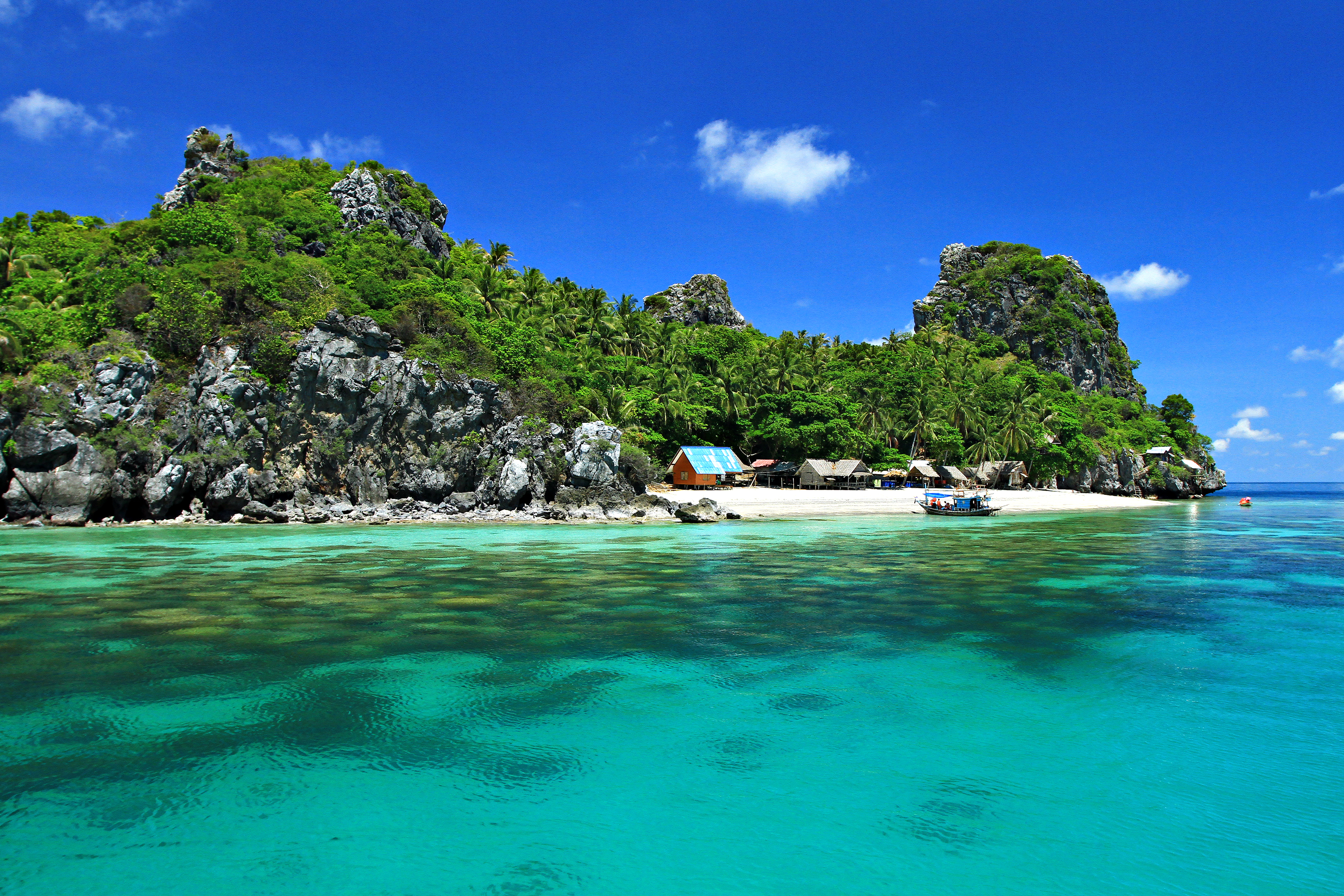
- Mu Ko Chumphon National Park

- Flag Seal
- Mottoes: "ประตูภาคใต้ ไหว้เสด็จในกรมฯ ชมไร่กาแฟ แลหาดทรายรี ดีกล้วยเล็บมือ ขึ้นชื่อรังนก" ("Gateway to the South. Worship the Prince (Chumphon Khet Udomsak). See the coffee plantations and Sai Ri Beach. Famed for the lady finger bananas and bird's nest")
- Map of Thailand highlighting Chumphon province
- Country: Thailand
- Capital: Chumphon

Government
  - Type: Province and Provincial Administrative Organization
  - Body: Chumphon Province and Chumphon Provincial Administrative Organization
  - Governor: Thianchai Chukittiwiboon
  - PAO Chief Executive: Nopporn Usit

Area
  - Total: 5,998 km^{2} (2,316 sq mi)
  - Rank: 37th

Population (2024)
  - Total: ▼508,053
  - Rank: 53rd
  - Density: 85/km^{2} (220/sq mi)
  - Rank: 56th

Human Achievement Index
  - HAI (2022): 0.6677 "high" Ranked 7th

GDP
  - Total: baht 79 billion (US$2.8 billion) (2019)
- Time zone: UTC+7 (ICT)
- Postal code: 86xxx
- Calling code: 077
- ISO 3166 code: TH-86
- Website: chumphon.go.th chppao.go.th

Chumphon (Thai: ชุมพร, pronounced [t͡ɕʰūm.pʰɔ̄ːn]) is a southern province (changwat) of Thailand on the Gulf of Thailand. Neighbouring provinces are Prachuap Khiri Khan, Surat Thani, and Ranong. To the west it borders the Burmese province of Tanintharyi.

== Geography ==
Chumphon is on the Isthmus of Kra, the narrow land bridge connecting the Malay Peninsula with the mainland of Thailand. To the west are the hills of the Phuket mountain range and its northern continuation, the Tenasserim Hills. The east is coastal plain abutting the Gulf of Thailand. The main river is the Lang Suan River, which originates in Phato District. With a 222-kilometre-long (138 mi) coastline and 44 islands, the Chumphon Archipelago, Chumphon has waterfalls, peaceful beaches, green forests, mangroves, and rivers. The total forest area is 1,288 km^{2} (497 sq mi) or 21.5 percent of provincial area. Chumphon is regarded as part of "Gateway to the South".

=== National parks ===
There are two national parks, along with nine other national parks, make up region 4 (Surat Thani) of Thailand's protected areas.(Visitors in fiscal year 2024)

Namtok Ngao National Park	668 km^{2} (258 sq mi)	(94,891)
Mu Ko Chumphon National Park	317 km^{2} (122 sq mi)	(37,160)

=== Wildlife sanctuaries ===
There are four wildlife sanctuaries, along with three other wildlife sanctuaries, make up region 4 (Surat Thani) of Thailand's protected areas.

Khuan Mae Yai Mon Wildlife Sanctuary	464 km^{2} (179 sq mi)
Thung Raya–Na Sak Wildlife Sanctuary	338 km^{2} (131 sq mi)
Prince Chumphon South Park Wildlife Sanctuary	315 km^{2} (122 sq mi)
Prince Chumphon North Park (lower) Wildlife Sanctuary	287 km^{2} (111 sq mi)

Location protected areas of Chumphon

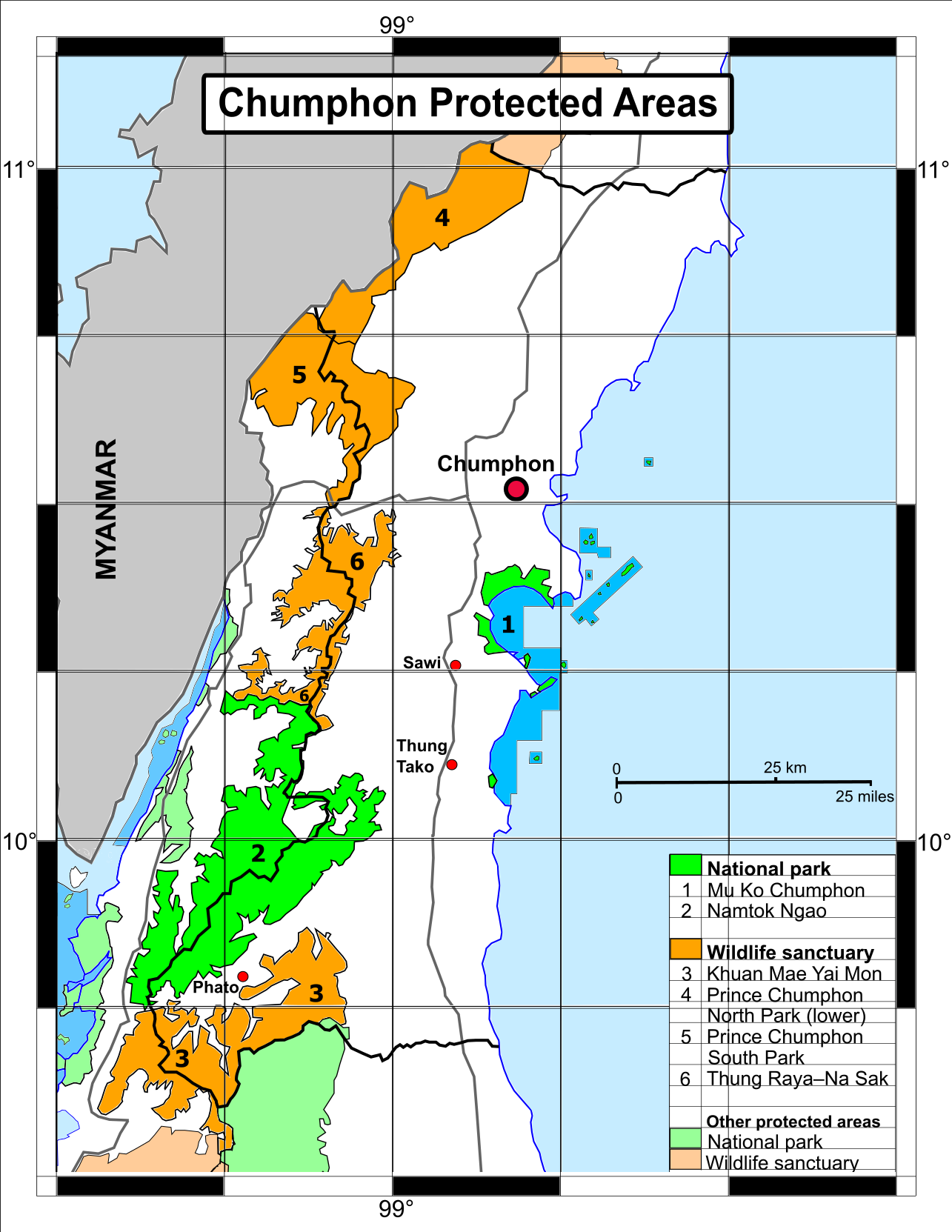
Chumphon protected areas

	National park
1	Mu Ko Chumphon
2	Namtok Ngao

	Wildlife sanctuary
3	Khuan Mae Yai Mon
4	Prince Chumphon North Park (lower)
5	Prince Chumphon South Park
6	Thung Raya-Na Sak

== History ==
Khao Sam Kaeo, on the eastern side of the Kra Isthmus, was occupied from the early fourth century to the second or first century BC. Sing C. Chew, reporting the excavations of Bérénice Bellina and her colleagues, describes a walled and palisaded settlement whose surrounding land grew dryland rice, millet and mung beans, crops whose archaeobotany points to China and India. Glass, beads, bracelets and high-tin bronze bowls were made there. Copper was imported and tin obtained locally. Chew takes the scale of this production and farming to imply a stratified society and a coastal port polity in contact with trading centres across Southeast Asia and beyond. He reports Bellina's comparison of the site, and of its counterpart on the western side of the isthmus, to the later ports of Malacca, Banten and Pasai. Cargo landed on the western side was carried overland to the eastern side in four or five days, a route the passage through the Straits of Malacca replaced only from the fourth century AD.

How far Indians settled at the site is disputed. Bellina reported that no concentration of production waste, and no other Indian material indicating a resident Indian group, was found there. Other reports of Bellina's work read it the other way. Charles Higham writes that the ornaments she recovered are finer than much Indian work, which he takes as a possible sign that Indian craftspeople came to the site. Sharada Srinivasan treats the site's ingot moulds, which resemble crucibles from West Bengal and Rajasthan, as support for Bellina's argument that South Asian artisans settled there or trained local workers. Hsiao-chun Hung and Peter Bellwood suggest the settlement may have held enclaves from India, southern Vietnam, Borneo or the Philippines, while adding that no group can be shown to have controlled the exchange system. Geochemical work by Robert Theunissen, Peter Grave and Grahame Bailey placed most Thai agate and carnelian beads outside India and concluded that carnelian was worked in Southeast Asia from early in the Iron Age. Rice remains give a similar picture. The japonica subspecies grown elsewhere in Thailand in the Bronze Age is absent from the site's levels of that date, and indica appears only in the first centuries of the historic period.

Hung and Bellwood also report incised and stamped pottery of the kind Wilhelm Solheim linked to Kalanay Cave in the central Philippines from Khao Sam Kaeo and from caves elsewhere in the province.

The southern part of the province was originally a separate province named Lang Suan. It was incorporated into Chumphon in 1932.

In November 1989 Typhoon Gay hit the province hard: 529 people were killed, 160,000 became homeless, and 7,130 km^{2} (2,753 sq mi) of farm land was destroyed. Gay is the only tropical storm on record that reached Thailand with typhoon wind strength.

Chumphon province is one of several clandestine way stations on the trafficking trail of Burmese and Rohingyas from nearby Burma (Myanmar) being moved south. Chumphon borders the Burmese province of Tanintharyi.

== Toponymy ==
There are two different theories on the origin of the name "Chumphon". According to one, it originates from Chumnumphon (lit., 'accumulation of forces') which derives from the fact that Chumphon was a frontier city. Another theory claims the name derives from a local tree named Maduea Chumphon (มะเดื่อชุมพร, Ficus racemosa), abundant in the province.

== Symbols ==
The provincial seal shows a fortune-bringing Deva on a lotus-pedestal, flanked by two Ficus racemosa. In the background a fort and two watchtowers are visible, a reference to the former camp where courageous warriors from the province gathered before going into battle against the enemy.

The provincial flower is the Indian shot (Canna indica), and the Ficus racemosa is the provincial tree. Spanner barb (Barbodes lateristriga) is the provincial fish.

== Administrative divisions ==
Map of eight districts

=== Provincial government ===
Chumphon is divided into eight districts (amphoes), 70 sub-districts (tambons), 736 villages (mubans).

1. Mueang Chumphon
2. Tha Sae
3. Pathio
4. Lang Suan
5. Lamae
6. Phato
7. Sawi
8. Thung Tako

=== Local government ===
As of 26 November 2019 there are: one Chumphon Provincial Administration Organisation (ongkan borihan suan changwat) and 27 municipal (thesaban) areas in the province. Chumphon and Lang Suan have town (thesaban mueang) status. Further 25 subdistrict municipalities (thesaban tambon). The non-municipal areas are administered by 51 Subdistrict Administrative Organisations - SAO (ongkan borihan suan tambon).

== Economy ==
The coffee-growing valley of Ban Panwal in Tha Sae District includes 178,283 rai of robusta coffee plantations. It produces more than 24 million tonnes a year. Chumphon province contributes 60 percent of Thailand's total coffee production. Local brands include Thamsing, ST Chumphon, and Khao Tha-Lu Chumporn.

Besides, Chumphon is considered as the province with the second largest durian growing area in the country, after Chanthaburi. Based on 2017 data, Chumphon has an area of 164,099 rai of durian, with a yield of approximately 128,894 tons, create income for the province of not less than 6,000 million baht a year. There are more farmers grow durian every year.

In addition to durian, Chumphon is also famous for its lady finger bananas and cavendish bananas. They are registered as GI products. The cavendish banana products are exported to Japan as much as 20 tons a week. Chumphon is considered the province with the most GI products in the south, with a total of five products.

== Human achievement index 2022 ==
Health	Education	Employment	Income
10	56	37	15
Housing	Family	Transport	Participation
58	20	64	9
Province Chumphon, with an HAI 2022 value of 0.6677 is "high", occupies place 7 in the ranking.

Since 2003, United Nations Development Programme (UNDP) in Thailand has tracked progress on human development at sub-national level using the Human achievement index (HAI), a composite index covering all the eight key areas of human development. National Economic and Social Development Board (NESDB) has taken over this task since 2017.

Rank	Classification
1–13	"High"
14–29	"Somewhat high"
30–45	"Average"
46–61	"Somewhat low"
62–77	"Low"

Map with provinces and HAI 2022 rankings

== Transportation ==
=== Air ===
Chumphon Airport is 30 kilometres (19 mi) north of Chumphon city in Pathio District. It has direct daily flights to Bangkok's Don Mueang Airport (DMK). Flights from Bangkok are around 60 minutes.

Nok Air and Thai AirAsia operates flights between Bangkok (Don Mueang, DMK) and Chumphon Airport (CJM). The airport has transit agents for onward travel to Chumphon and the islands of the Gulf of Thailand including Ko Tao, Ko Pha Ngan, and Ko Samui.

=== Rail ===
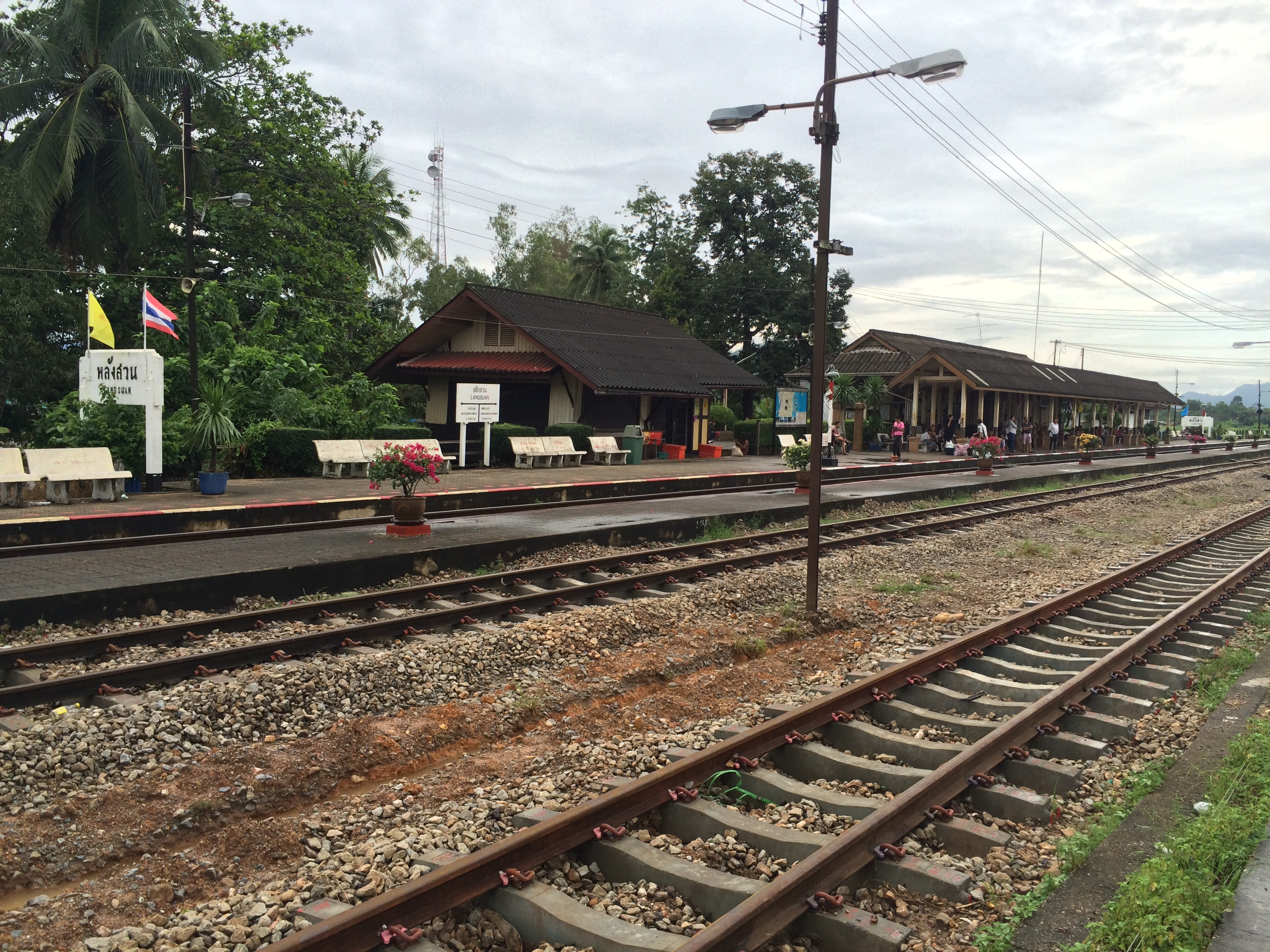
Lang Suan Railway Station

Chumphon Railway Station is a main station of Chumphon, it is 485 kilometres (301 mi) south of Bangkok Railway Station (Hua Lamphong). Chumphon is also the location of 26 other railway stations and railway halts. Lang Suan Railway Station in area of Lang Suan District is the last stop of the Southern Railway that starts from Thon Buri Railway Station (Bangkok Noi).

=== Road ===
Chumphon is 463 kilometres (288 mi) south of Bangkok by Petchkasem Road (Highway 4) via Pathom Phon Intersection before entering the Chumphon city, takes about 7 hours to travel. Can travel to here by bus from both Southern Bus (Taling Chan) and Northern Bus Terminals (Mo Chit 2).

== Tourism ==
In the first 11 months of 2015, Chumphon arrivals grew by 17 percent to 1.86 million and tourism revenue by 21 percent to 7.55 billion baht. Average hotel occupancy rose to 65 percent from 53 percent in 2014. Arrivals are expected to grow by 17 percent in 2016.

=== Beaches ===
Chumphon has a 222 kilometres (138 mi) long coastline.

- Hat Thung Wua Laen: a beach 16 kilometres (9.9 mi) northeast of downtown Chumphon. Food and accommodation resorts and food stalls abound in the beach area. Thung Wua Laen is 20 kilometres (12 mi) from the train station of Chumphon and 17 kilometres (11 mi) from Chumphon airport in Pathio.
- Hat Saphli: about 2 kilometres (1.2 mi) from Hat Thung Wua Laen, it is a crescent-shaped beach with white sand. This beach was ranked as the cleanest beach in the country by the Pollution Control Department in 2017. There is a fishing village named Ban Tha Samet, a large community that is known for making shrimp paste and fish sauce.

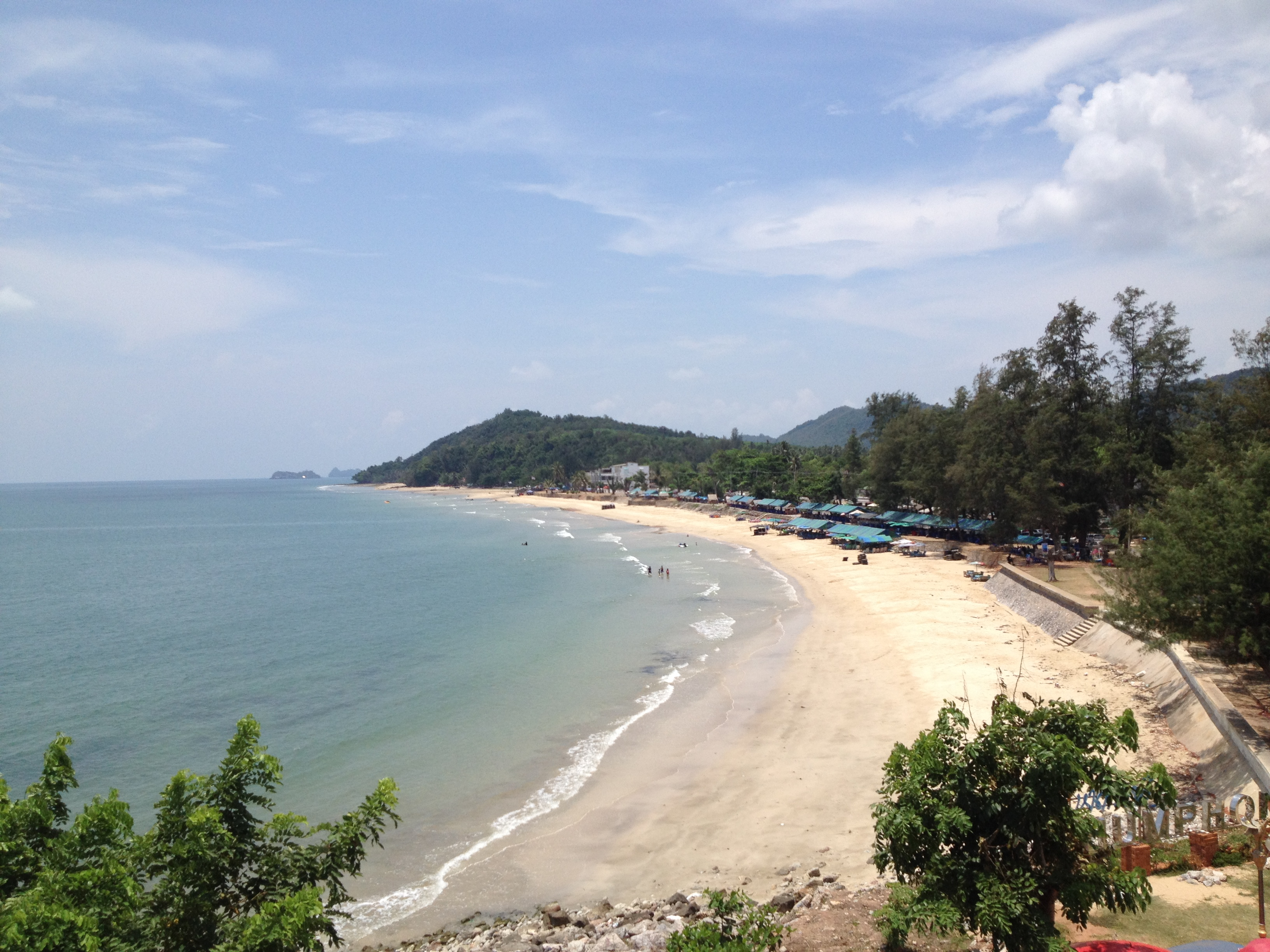
Hat Sai Ri

- Hat Sai Ri: This beach has fine white sand and clear water. It is also the location of shrine of Prince Abhakara Kiartivongse, Prince of Chumphon, who was regarded as the "Father of the Royal Thai Navy". Nearby is the HTMS Chumphon, a torpedo boat. It is 68 metres (223 ft) long and 6.55 metres (21.5 ft) wide. Hat Sai Ri and Prince of Chumphon Shrine are in Na Cha-ang Subdistrict, Mueang Chumphon District.

== Gallery ==
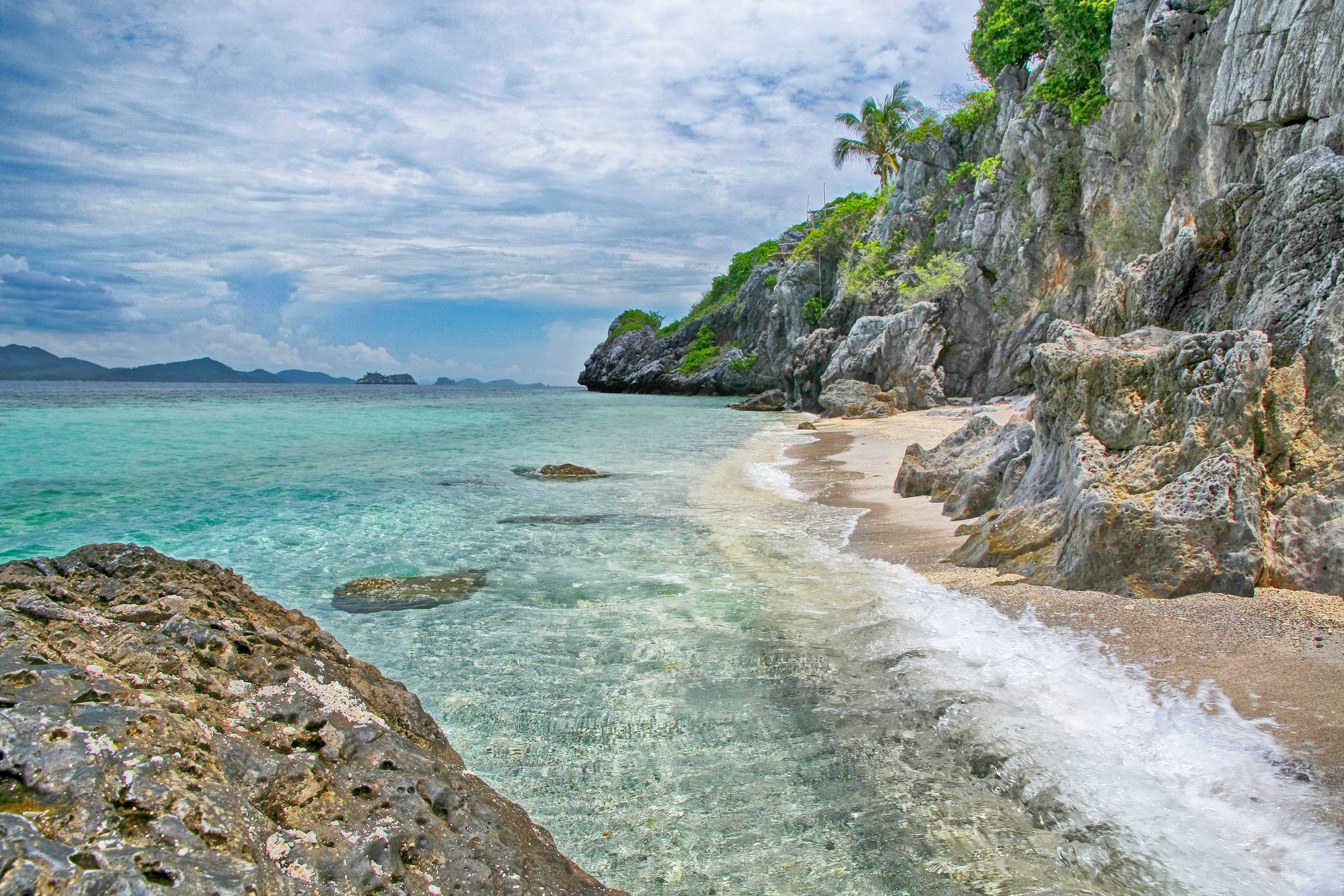
Ko Rangkachio, Mu Ko Chumphon National Park

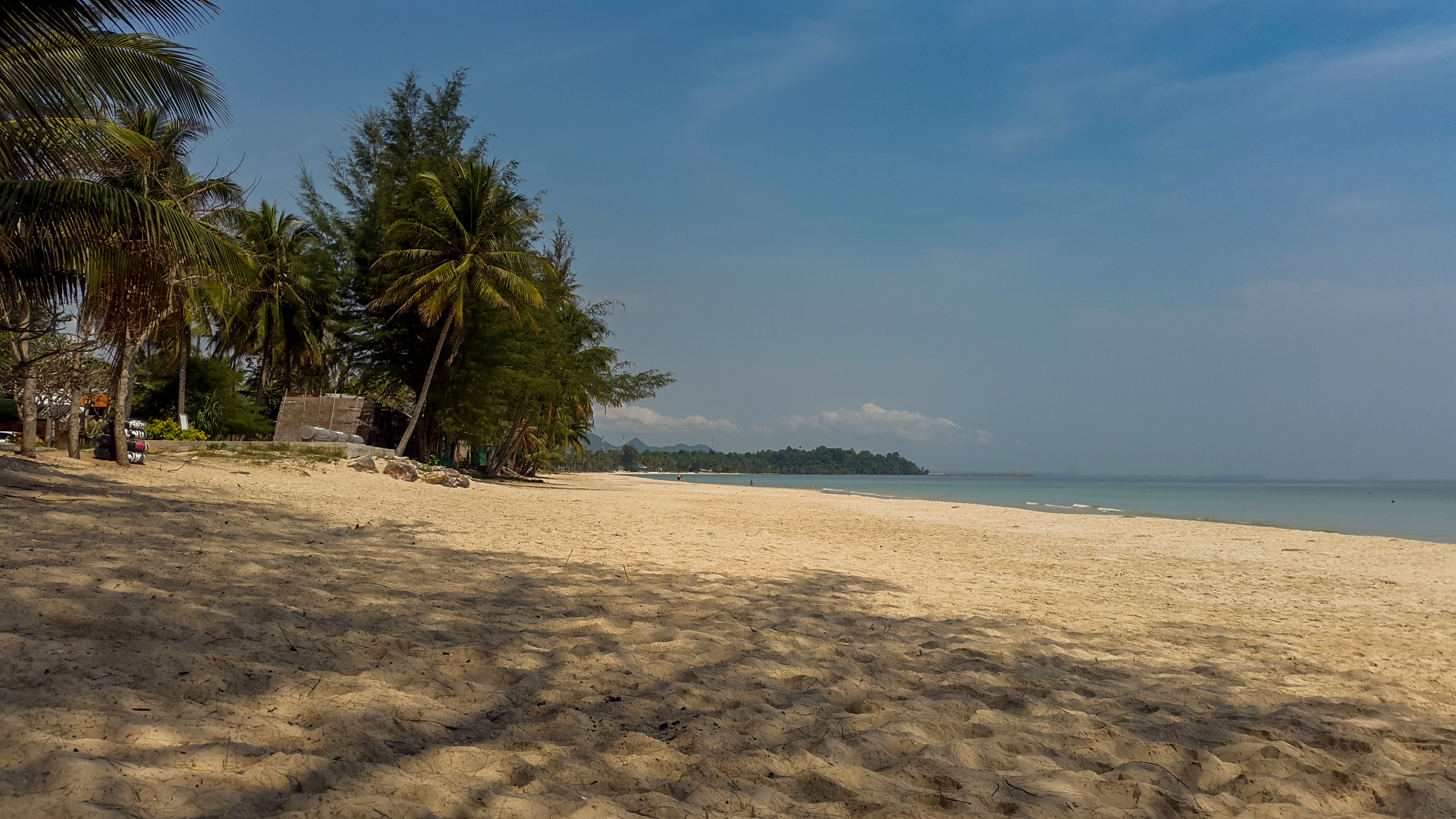
Thung Wua Laen Beach

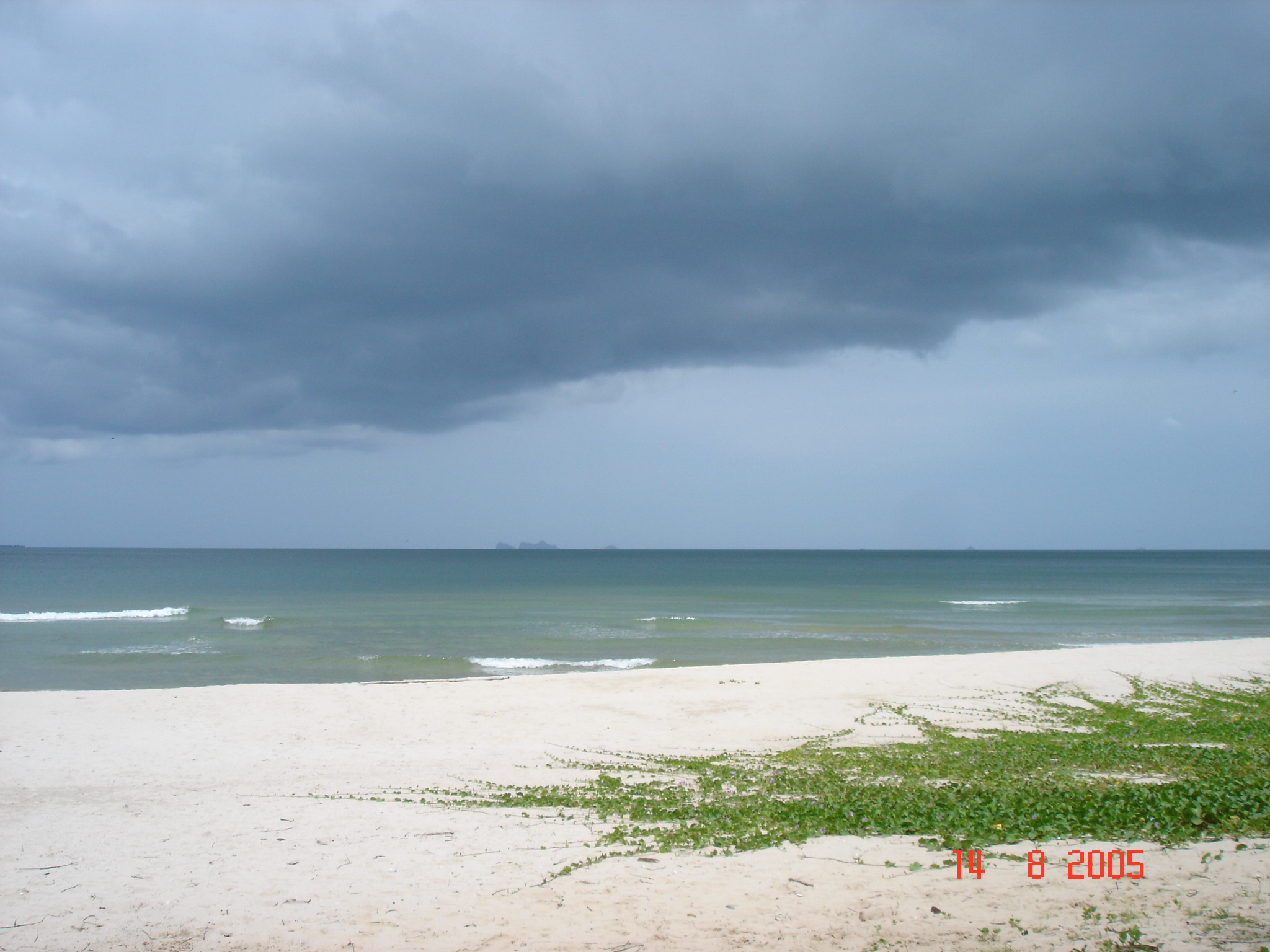
Another corner of Thung Wua Laen Beach

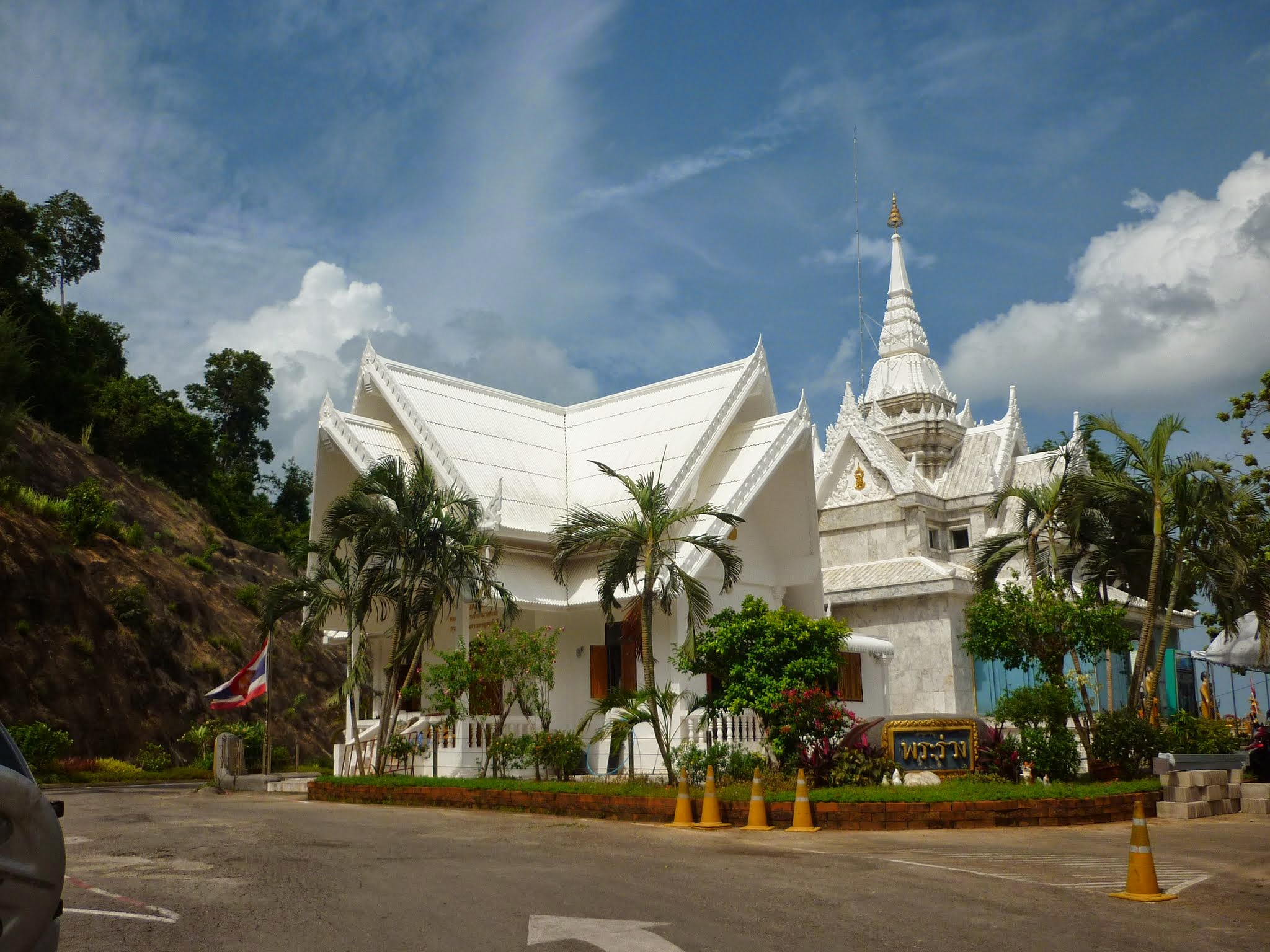
Prince of Chumphon Shrine at Hat Sai Ri

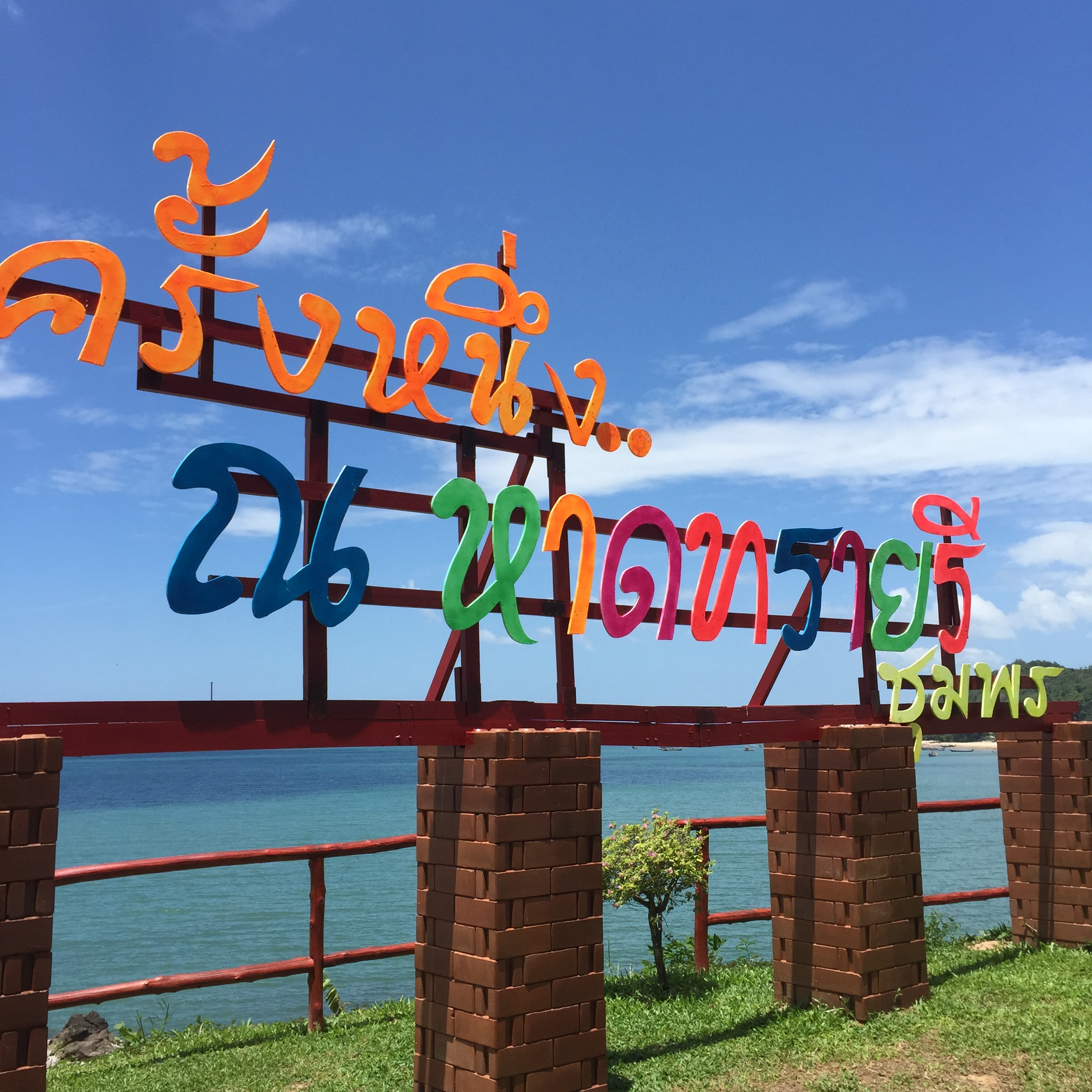
Thai nameplate of Hat Sai Ri, it states that "once upon a time at Hat Sai Ri, Chumphon"

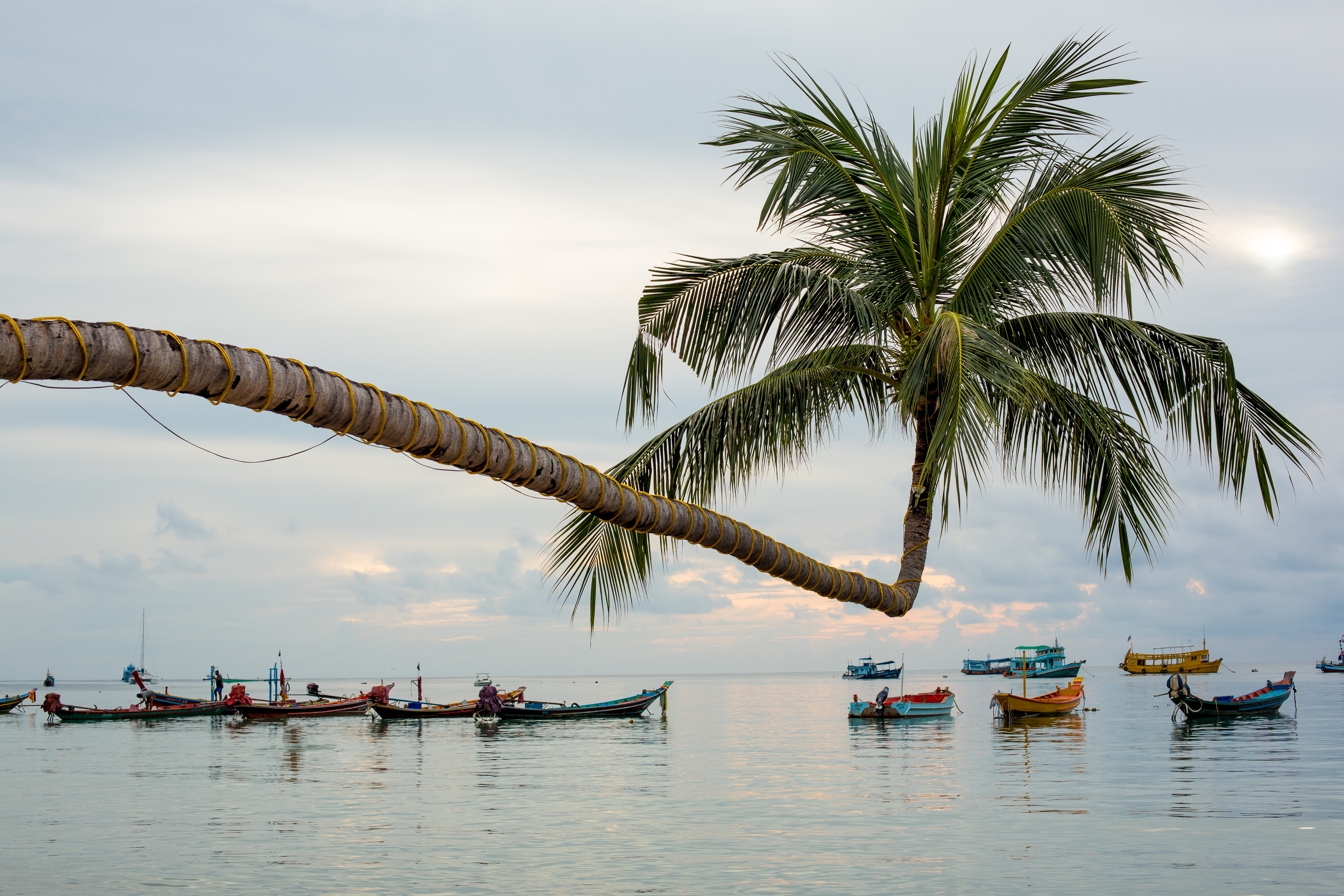
The Extraordinary Coconut Tree in Ko Tao

== Notable personalities ==
- Baitong Jareerat Petsom (b. 1993) - Environmental advocate, scriptwriter, host, director and beauty pageant titleholder won as Miss Earth - Fire 2021
- Sopita Tanasan, Weightlifter
