= Klong Chan Sports Center =

Multi-purpose stadium in Thailand

- Interactive map of Klong Chan Sports Center
- Location: Bang Kapi, Bangkok, Thailand
- Coordinates: 13°46′41″N 100°38′42″E
- Owner: National Housing Authority
- Operator: National Housing Authority
- Capacity: ?
- Surface: Grass

Klong Chan Sports Center (Thai: สนามกีฬาการเคหะแห่งชาติคลองจั่น) is a multi-purpose stadium in Bang Kapi, Bangkok, Thailand. It is currently used mostly for football matches.
