= National Housing Authority =

National Housing Authority may refer to:

- National Housing Authority (Albania)
- National Housing Authority (Bangladesh)
- National Housing Authority (Philippines)
- National Housing Authority (Thailand)
