= Dallëndyshe Bici =

Albanian lawyer and politician (born 1978)

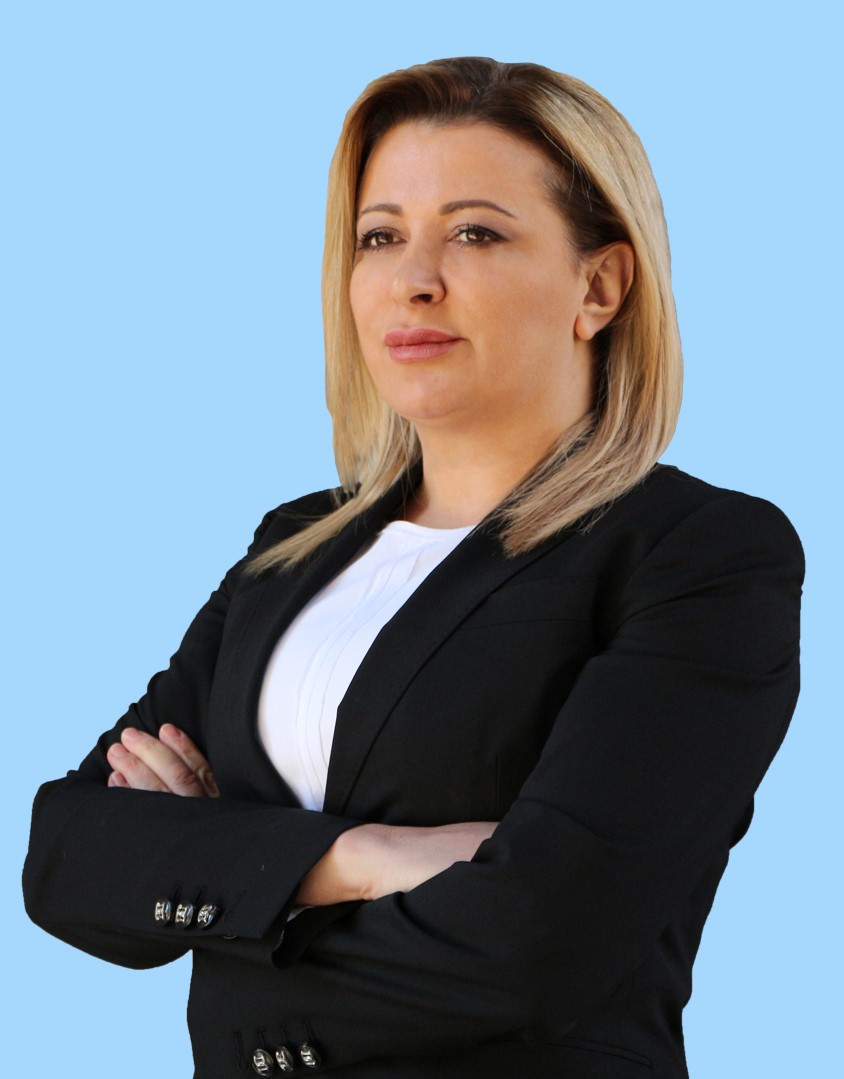

Chief Inspector of the National Inspectorate for Territorial Protection (IKMT)
- Incumbent
- Assumed office July 2024
- Prime Minister: Edi Rama
- Preceded by: Ervin Hoxha

Director of the State Cadastre Agency (ASHK)
- In office March 2023 – July 2024
- Prime Minister: Edi Rama
- Preceded by: Artan Lame
- Succeeded by: Agim Ismaili

Chief Inspector of the National Inspectorate for Territorial Protection (IKMT)
- In office August 2014 – March 2023
- Prime Minister: Edi Rama

Personal details
- Born: 30 April 1978 (age 47) Kukës, PSR Albania
- Party: Socialist Party of Albania
- Education: University of Tirana (LLB), University of Bordeaux (M.A.)
- Occupation: Lawyer, politician

Dallëndyshe Bici (Albanian pronunciation: [daˈɫəndyʃɛ ˈbit͡si]; born 30 April 1978) is an Albanian lawyer and politician who currently serves as Chief Inspector of the National Inspectorate for Territorial Protection (IKMT) of Albania, a position she resumed in July 2024. She has also held the roles of Director of the State Cadastre Agency (ASHK; March 2023–July 2024) and previously IKMT Chief Inspector (August 2014–March 2023) under Prime Minister Edi Rama’s administration.

== Education ==
Bici earned her Bachelor of Laws (LLB) from the University of Tirana, Faculty of Law. She is a certified attorney with the Albanian National Chamber of Advocates. In November 2005, she completed a Master’s degree in Institutional Administration at the University of Bordeaux in France, in partnership with the French Ministry for Foreign Affairs.

== Career ==
From August 2014 to March 2023, Bici served as Chief Inspector at IKMT, overseeing enforcement of territorial and land-use regulations. In March 2023, she was appointed Director of the State Cadastre Agency (ASHK), replacing Artan Lame, before returning to IKMT in July 2024, succeeding Ervin Hoxha.
