= Prime Minister's Office (Albania) =

Office and residence of the Prime Minister of the Republic of Albania

- Kryeministria
- Official seal

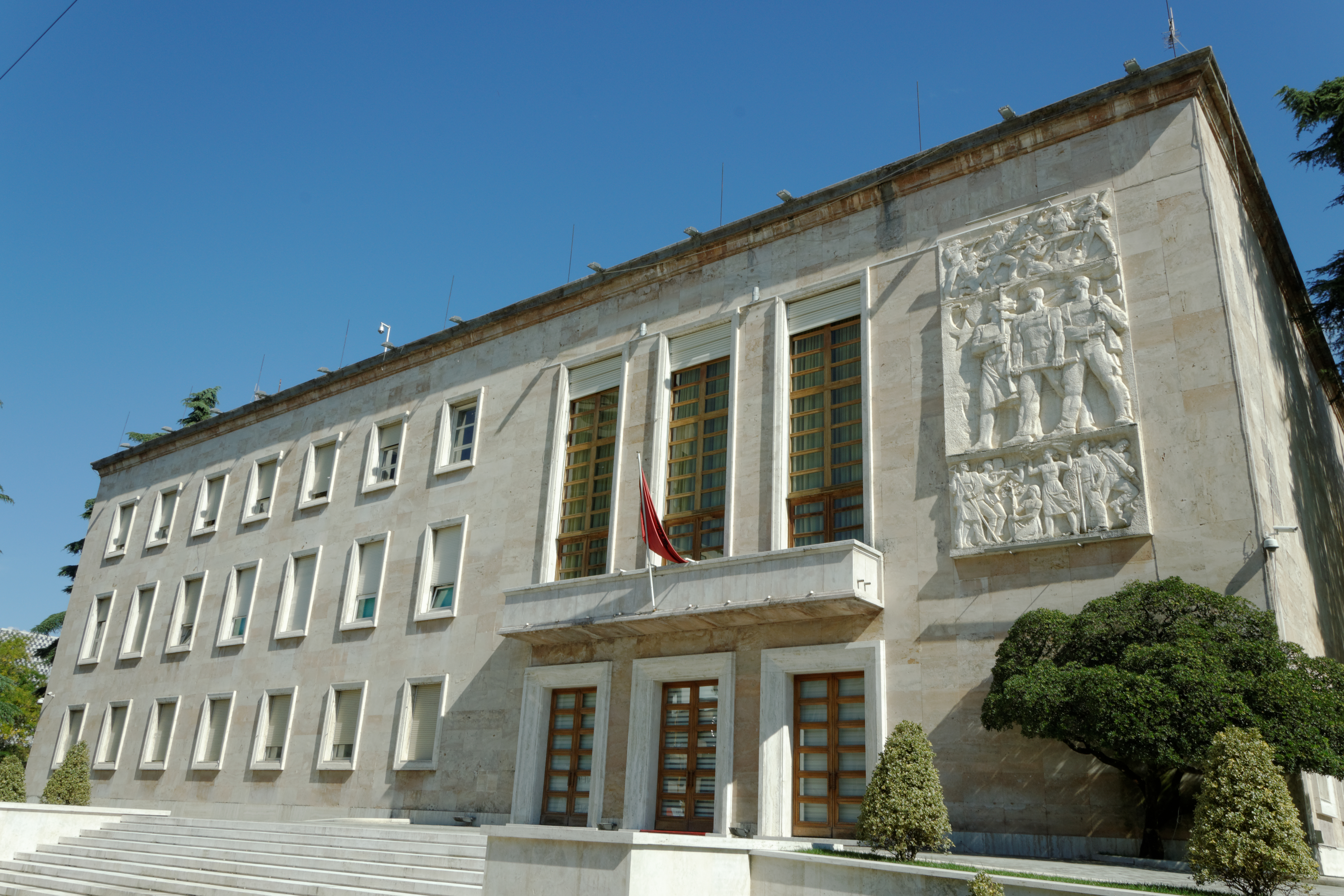

Agency overview
- Formed: 1920; 106 years ago
- Jurisdiction: Republic of Albania
- Headquarters: Dëshmorët e Kombit Boulevard 7, 1010 Tirana, Albania; 41.3216877°N 19.820716°E
- Annual budget: 465 billion ALL (2018)
- Minister responsible: Edi Rama, Prime Minister of Albania
- Deputy Minister responsible: Albana Koçiu, Deputy Prime Minister of Albania
- Website: kryeministria.al

The Prime Minister's Office (Albanian: Kryeministria, Albanian pronunciation: [kɾyɛministɾia]) is a ministerial-level executive agency within the government of Albania that assists the prime minister and the Council of Ministers.

It consists of the immediate staff of the prime minister, as well as multiple levels of support staff reporting to the prime minister and the secretary-general of the office.

The building, located at the Dëshmorët e Kombit Boulevard in Tirana, was constructed in 1941 and serves as the seat of the prime minister and several ministers.

== Subordinate institutions ==
- Audit Agency of Assistance Programs accredited by the European Union
- Coordination Center Against Violent Extremism
- Management Agency of Water Resources
- Agency for the Delivery of Integrated Services
- Public Procurement Agency
- Territorial Development Agency
- State Agency for Strategic Programming and Aid Coordination
- National Agency for Information Society
- Agency for Dialogue and Co-governance
- Agency for Support of the Civil Society
- State Cadastre Agency
- Albanian Telegraphic Agency
- Agency for Media and Information
- National Authority for Electronic Certification and Cyber Security
- State Authority for Geospatial Information
- State Bar
- Department of Public Administration
- General Directorate of Archives
- Directorate of Government Services
- Directorate of Securing Classified Information
- Central Inspectorate
- State Committee on Minorities
- State Committee of Cults
- Special Unit of Anticorruption and Antievasion
- Albanian School of Public Administration
- State Intelligence Service
- Academy of Sciences

== See also ==
- Politics of Albania
- Council of Ministers (Albania)
