= List of Thailand National Games sports =

Air sports – Board games – Canoeing – Cycling – Equestrian – Gymnastics – Extreme sport – Volleyball

Sport (Discipline)	Body			67	68	69	70	71	72	73	74	75	76	77	78	79	80	81	82	83	84	85	86	87	88	89	90	91
Sport (Discipline)	World	Asia	Thailand	67	68	69	70	71	72	73	74	75	76	77	78	79	80	81	82	83	84	85	86	87	88	89	90	91
Aeromodelling	FAI	AFA	RASAT																									
Parachuting	FAI	AFA	RASAT																									
Paragliding	FAI	AFA	RASAT																									
Powered paragliding	FAI	AFA	RASAT																									
Archery	WAF	AAF	NAAT																									
Athletics	IAAF	AAA	AAT	•	•	•	•	•	•	•	•	•	•	•	•	•	•	•	•	•	•	•	•	•	•	•	•	•
Badminton	BWF	BAC	BAT	•	•	•	•	•	•	•	•	•	•	•	•	•	•	•	•	•	•	•	•	•	•	•	•	•
Baseball	IBF	BFA	ABAT																									
Basketball	FIBA	FIBA Asia	BSAT	•	•	•	•	•	•	•	•	•	•	•	•	•	•	•	•	•	•	•	•	•	•	•	•	•
Bridge	WBF	APBF	CBLT																									
Go	IGF	AGF	GAT																									
Bodybuilding	IFBB	AFBF	TBPSA																									
Bowling	WTBA	ABF	TBPSA																•	•	•	•	•	•	•	•	•	•
Boxing	AIBA	ASBC	ABAT	•	•	•	•	•	•	•	•	•	•	•	•	•	•	•	•	•	•	•	•	•	•	•	•	•
Slalom canoeing	IFBB	ACC	RCAT																									
Sprint canoeing	IFBB	ACC	RCAT																									
Cricket	ICC	ACC	CAT																									
Cue sports	WCBS	ACBS	BSAT																									
BMX racing	ACC	ACC	TCA	•	•	•	•	•	•	•	•	•	•	•	•	•	•	•	•	•	•	•	•	•	•	•	•	•
Mountain biking	ACC	ACC	TCA	•	•	•	•	•	•	•	•	•	•	•	•	•	•	•	•	•	•	•	•	•	•	•	•	•
Road cycling	ACC	ACC	TCA	•	•	•	•	•	•	•	•	•	•	•	•	•	•	•	•	•	•	•	•	•	•	•	•	•
Track cycling	ACC	ACC	TCA	•	•	•	•	•	•	•	•	•	•	•	•	•	•	•	•	•	•	•	•	•	•	•	•	•
Dancesport	WDF	ADF	CAT																									
Dressage	IFE	AEF	TEF																									
Eventing	IFE	AEF	TEF																									
Show jumping	IFE	AEF	TEF																									
BMX Park	IBMXFF	AESF	TESA																									
BMX Flatland	IBMXFF	AESF	TESA																									
Inline skating	FIRS	AESF	TESA																									
Roller skating Freestyle	FIRS	AESF	TESA																									
Roller speed skating	FIRS	AESF	TESA																									
Skateboarding	ISF	AESF	TESA																									
Fencing	FIE	FCA	AFAT																									
Field hockey	FIH	AHF	THA																									
Football	FIFA	AFC	THA																									
