= Naat (disambiguation) =

Naʽat (Arabic: نعت) is poetry that specifically praises the Islamic prophet Muhammad.

Naat and similar may also refer to:

- National Archery Association of Thailand, The archery government of Thailand
- Nucleic acid amplification test (NAAT), a biochemical technique used to detect a virus or a bacterium
- Na`at (village), a village in Yemen
- Naat, a fictional island featured in Clark Ashton Smith's Zothique stories
- NaAt, chemical formula of sodium astatide
