= Wat Bueng Thonglang =

Buddhist temple in Bangkok, Thailand

- วัดบึงทองหลาง
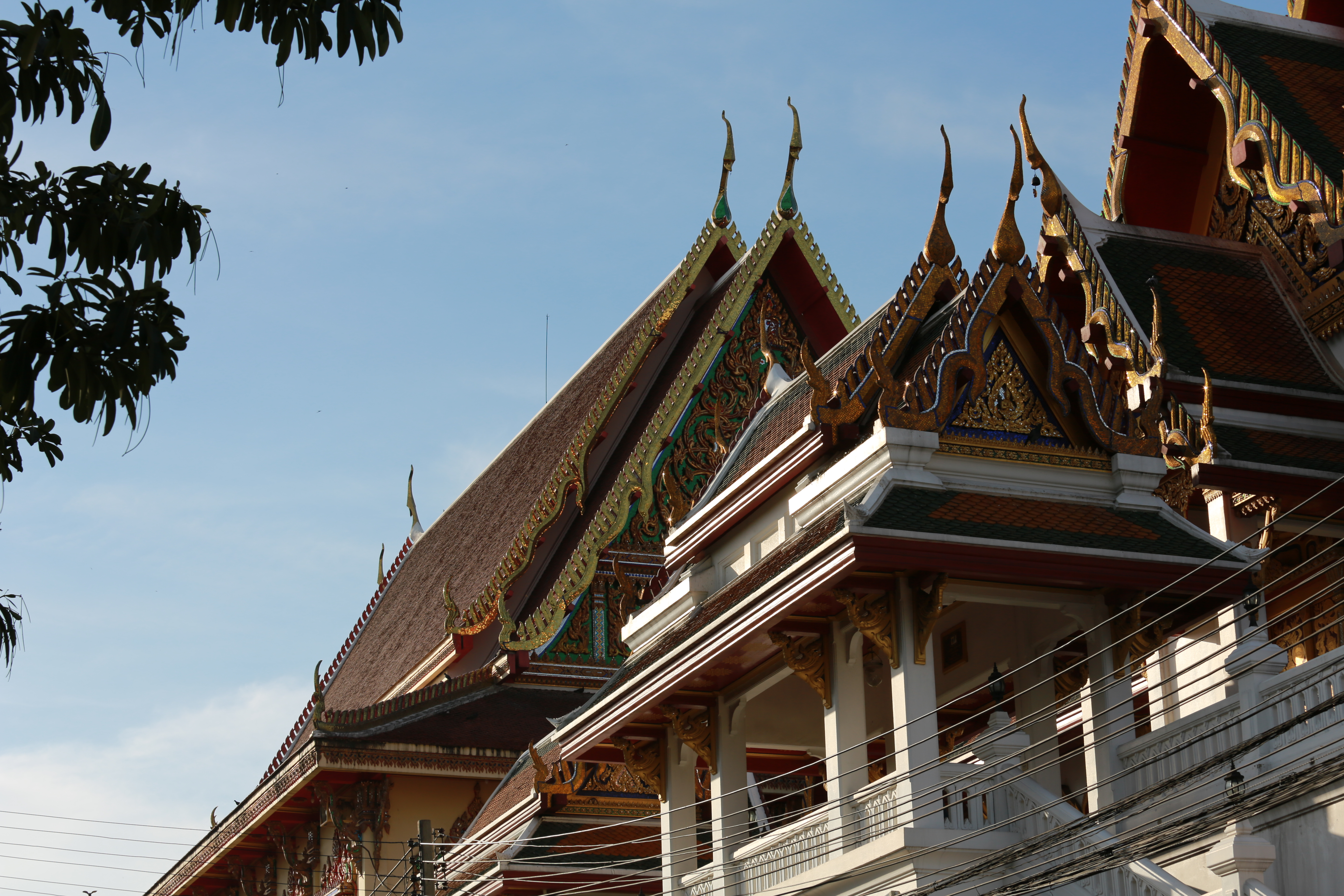
- Wat Bueng Thonglang

- Location within Bangkok

Religion
- Affiliation: Theravada Buddhism

Location
- Country: Thailand
- Interactive map of Wat Bueng Thonglang
- Coordinates: 13°47′48″N 100°37′37″E

Wat Bueng Thonglang (Thai: วัดบึงทองหลาง, pronounced [wát bɯ̄ŋ tʰɔ̄ːŋ.lǎːŋ]) is a Buddhist temple in Bang Kapi District, Bangkok, Thailand. It was measured under Theravada School, Section of Maha Nikai. It is located at Lat Phrao 101 Road. The temple was founded in King Rama V period by Longpoo Puk (Thai: หลวงปู่พัก ธมฺมทตฺโต) who was ordained in Wat Suthatthepvararam, and was a student of Sangaraja Phea.

== Buddhist's Buildings ==
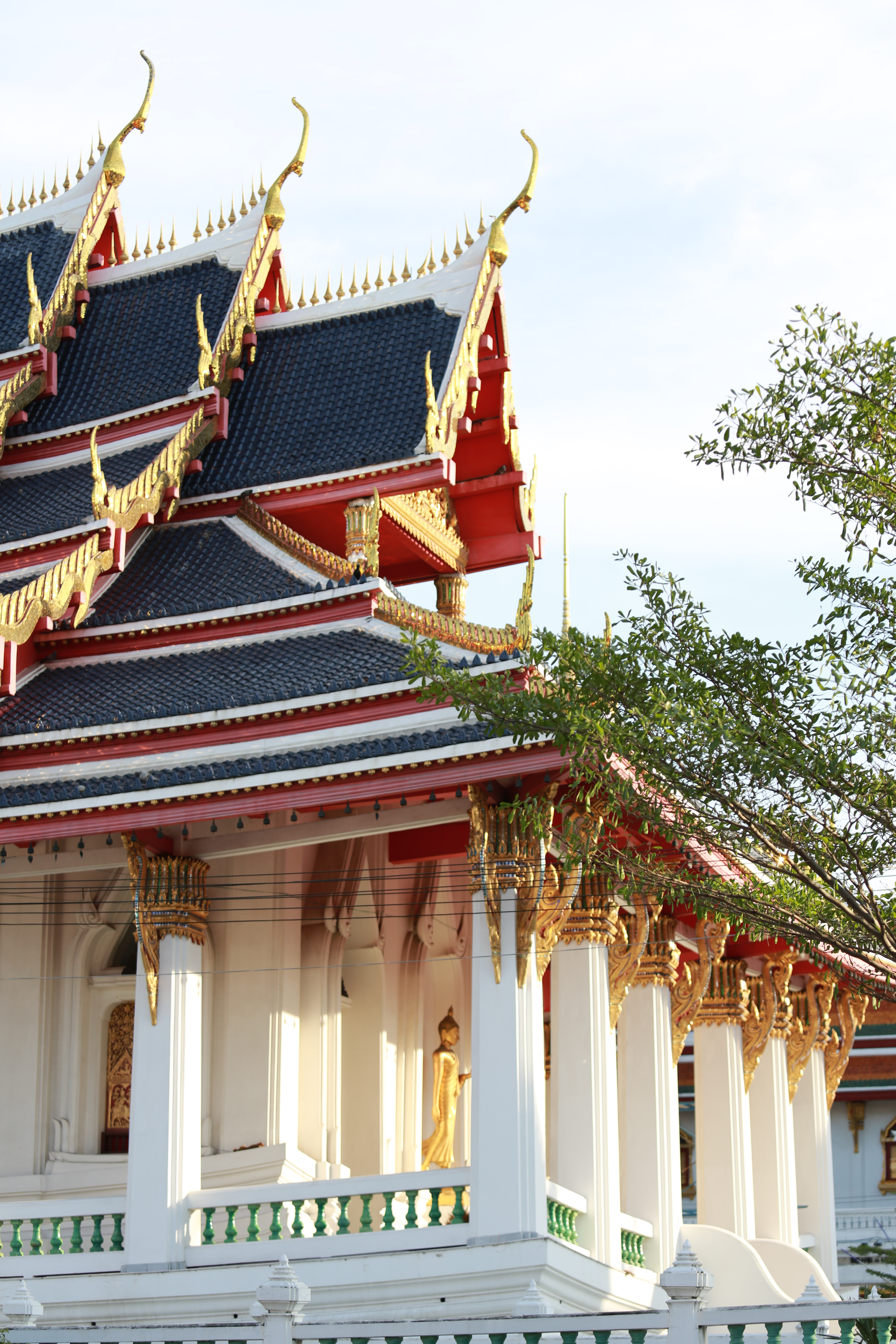
Chapel or Ordination Hall of Wat Bueng Thonglang

- Chapel (Thai : อุโบสถ)
- Hall of Laungpoo Puk who founder the temple. (Thai: มณฑปหลวงปู่พัก ธมฺมทตฺโต)
- Sala Kan Parian (Thai : ศาลาการเปรียญ) or Sermon hall in a monastery
- Kuti or cubicle for monks to stay in temple between ordination in temple (Thai: กุฎิสงฆ์)

== Abbots ==
- Ven. Phrakrudhammasamajarn [Puk Dhammatattoo] (Thai: พระครูธรรมสมาจารย์ (พัก ธมฺมทตฺโต)) Period 1917–1958
- Ven. Phrakrupisalviriyakum [Singto Tisso] Period 1958–2004 พระครูพิศาลวิริยคุณ (สิงห์โต ติสฺโส) อดีตเจ้าอาวาส
- Ven. Phrakrusujitvimol [Juang Sucitto] Period 2004–2021
- Ven. Phrakrusangkaruk Sathit Sukhakamo Period-2021–present
  - Assistant Abbot

Phrapalad Raphin Buddhisaro Duputy Dean Faculty of Social Science MCu https://soc.mcu.ac.th/?page_id=3121

== property land of Bueng Thong Lang Temple ==
Luang Pu Phak Thammatto is regarded as a senior monk who truly pioneered Wat Bueng Thong Lang. You have provided land that is the soil of the monks. As a treasure of Wat Bueng Thong Lang, a large number of approximately 300 rai at present and has been given as a residence. to the people in the name of Wat Bueng Thong Lang serve the people to be an educational institution of 3 schools consisting of Wat Bueng Thong Lang School (Elementary School) Wat Bueng Thong Lang Secondary School (Secondary level 1-6) and Bangkok College of Arts and Crafts (vocational level / vocational certificate) and provided as a public office such as building a road linking between Wat Bueng Thong Lang with Lat Phrao Road or the road in front of Wat Bueng Thong Lang, Soi 101 at present, etc. The land that appears to be the assets of Wat Bueng Thong Lang today consists of

1. The plot of land to set up a temple, called the current temple location, is about 60 rai, which is a place to build religious objects that have developed with time, such as 1 Ubosot, 2 wihans, a multi-purpose pavilion. More than 16 funeral pavilions, more than 30 monks' residences, parking spaces, 4 crematoriums, etc.

2. Land plot for setting up Secondary School Wat Bueng Thong Lang, approximately 30 rai

3. Land plot for setting up Wat Bueng Thong Lang School, about 30 rai

4. Land plot for setting up the Bangkok College of Arts and Crafts, about 30 rai

5. At the land plot of Lad Phrao Road 101, currently is the location of the community 101 Bueng Thong Lang (in front of the temple), located at Lad Phrao Road, Soi 101, Bang Kapi District, with an area of 27 rai of monks. The temple was allocated for people to live in around 1975. ? and has been registered as a community by the Community Development Office Bangkok on October 13, 1992 (1992) currently has approximately 210+ residents, 798+ families.

6. At the Land Monastery plot, Lad Phrao 87, is currently the location of Chantrasuk Community Located on Lat Phrao Road, Soi 87, Wang Thonglang District There is an area of monks in the amount of 24.07 rai, lived in about 1975 and was registered as a community. by the Community Development Office Bangkok on October 13, 1992. Currently, there are approximately 218+ families, 766+ residents.

7. At the Monastery of the Ram Inthra plot, Soi Watcharaphon (Tha Raeng), has an area of 25 rai, allocated for people to live in. Call the Watcharapranee Community (Tha Rang), Ram Inthra Road, Soi Watcharaphon (Watcharaphon Intersection), Tha Rang Sub-District, Bang Khen District, which the temple has allocated. People living in around 1977? and has been registered as a community by the Community Development Office Bangkok on June 3, 1996. Currently, there are approximately 225+ residents, 804+ families.

8. At the soil of monks, plots along Kaset-Nawamin Road Kasetsart-Nawamin Road plot, approximately 65 rai, 2 title deeds, 1125, total area 43 rai 1 ngan, 72 wa (was surrendered 4 rai 1 ngan 21.7 wa, remaining 39 rai 50.3 wa) and title deed no. 1126, 27 rai 1 ngan. 96 wa (expropriated 2 rai 6.6 wa, remaining 25 rai 1 ngan 89.4 wa) Currently rented to the private sector [Boonthavorn, Nawamin Agriculture Branch]
