= Traill International School =

- โรงเรียนนานาชาติเทร็ลล์

Location
- 43 Soi 16 Ramkhamhaeng Road; Bangkok; Thailand
- 13.75151°N 100.61456°E

Information
- Former name: The Preparatory School
- Established: 1966
- Founder: Mr and Mrs Anthony Traill
- Head of school: Barry Stockton
- Gender: Boys/Girls
- Age range: 2 to 18
- Enrollment: 450
- Colours: Traill Red (Phoenix), Traill Yellow (Griffin), and Traill Green (Pegasus).
- Slogan: "Secure Your Future"
- Accreditations: European Council of International Schools; British Schools Overseas; Federation of British International Schools in Asia; Educational Development Trust
- Website: www.traillschool.ac.th

Traill International School, Bangkok (Thai: โรงเรียนนานาชาติเทร็ลล์, RTGS: Rong Rian Nana Chat Thren) is a school in Bang Kapi District, Bangkok, Thailand.

Established in 1966, it has an enrollment of approximately 500 students ranging from Pre - Kindergarten to Sixth Form. The standardised National Curriculum for England is followed by all year groups in the school.

== History ==
Traill International School, initially ‘The Preparatory School’, was founded in 1966 by Mr and Mrs Anthony Traill.

It was the very first British Secondary School in Thailand, with an initial student roll of only 82.

== Houses ==
Traill International School has three houses: Pegasus, Griffin, and Phoenix. These names were chosen approximately 20 years ago to represent cross-cultural legendary creatures attributed with intelligence, strength, courage, ambition and fortitude. Characteristics which are regularly demonstrated by their students. Students throughout the school compete in events and challenges throughout the school year ranging from sporting to good citizenship. A special emphasis is placed on events that stimulate the student’s minds and are designed to provide opportunities that challenge each student. Students are awarded points for participating, as well as winning, and these contribute to the overall cross campus total of the Houses. The House system fosters in the students a strong sense of teamwork and develops character in the students, which will stay with them for the rest of their lives. Year after year older students encourage and support the younger children in whatever activity they are engaged in, much like an extended family.

At the end of school year assembly the Interhouse Cup is presented to the House who has accumulated the most points.

== Football club ==
Traill International school รร.เทร็ล อินเตอร์เนชั่นแนล
- Full name: Traill International Football Club สโมสรฟุตบอลโรงเรียนเทร็ล อินเตอร์เนชั่นแนล
- Founded: 2016; 10 years ago
- Ground: ? Bangkok, Thailand
- League: 2017 Thailand Amateur League Bangkok Metropolitan Region

Traill International school Football Club (Thai สโมสรฟุตบอลโรงเรียนเทร็ล อินเตอร์เนชั่นแนล), is a Thai football club based in Bangkok, Thailand. The club is currently playing in the 2017 Thailand Amateur League Bangkok Metropolitan Region.

Season	League									FA Cup	League Cup	Top goalscorer	
Season	Division	P	W	D	L	F	A	Pts	Pos	FA Cup	League Cup	Name	Goals
2016	DIV 3 Central	3	1	1	1	3	7	4	33rd - 34th	Didn't Enter	Can't Enter		
2017	TA Bangkok	1	0	0	1	1	3	0	13th - 24th	Didn't Enter	Can't Enter		
2018	TA Bangkok									QR	Can't Enter		

Champions	Runners-up	Promoted	Relegated
