= Ramkhamhaeng Advent International School =

- โรงเรียนนานาชาติแอ๊ดเวนต์รามคำแหง

Location
- 1 Soi Ramkhamhaeng 119; Bang Kapi, Bangkok; Thailand
- Coordinates: 13.7683961°N 100.6583232°E

Information
- Type: International school
- Motto: “They shall all be taught of God.”
- Denomination: Seventh-day Adventist
- Founded: 1999
- Founder: Mr. Udom Srikureja
- CEEB code: 695519
- Grades: P-12
- Gender: Coeducational
- Enrollment: approximately 700
- Education system: Structured American
- Language: English
- Athletics: Basketball, Soccer, Volleyball, Badminton, Swimming, Table Tennis
- Accreditation: ONESQA, WASC, AP, ISAT
- School fees: 201,000 - 290,500 THB. (Increasing annually)
- Website: www.rais.ac.th

Ramkhamhaeng Advent International School (RAIS; Thai: โรงเรียนนานาชาติแอ๊ดเวนต์รามคำแหง, RTGS: Rong Rian Nana Chat Aetwen Ramkhamhaeng) is an international school in Bang Kapi District, Bangkok, Thailand, established in 1999.

Ramkhamhaeng Advent International School (RAIS) is a privately owned Christian school serving students from Daycare to Grade 12 in the greater Bangkok area. It is operated by the G.J. Education Company Ltd. In August 1999, RAIS came into existence under the name, Ramkhamhaeng Adventist International School (a minor alteration was made in the school's name in 2005). In the first school year, RAIS enrolled sixty-nine students, and has experienced a consistent growth in enrollment in each subsequent year since the school's inception. Most recent enrollment figures show the total number of students reaching nearly seven hundred in grades K-12 and English as a Foreign Language (EFL) without counting the feeding programs.

The facilities include fully air-conditioned classrooms, indoor and outdoor playgrounds, mess hall, auditorium, air-conditioned gymnasium, Basketball courts, Science labs, three air-conditioned cafeterias, and a soccer field.

This school is a member of Thailand International Schools Association, accredited by Western Association of Schools and Colleges, and approved by Thai Ministry of Education.
