= Rexhep Shala =

Albanian politician

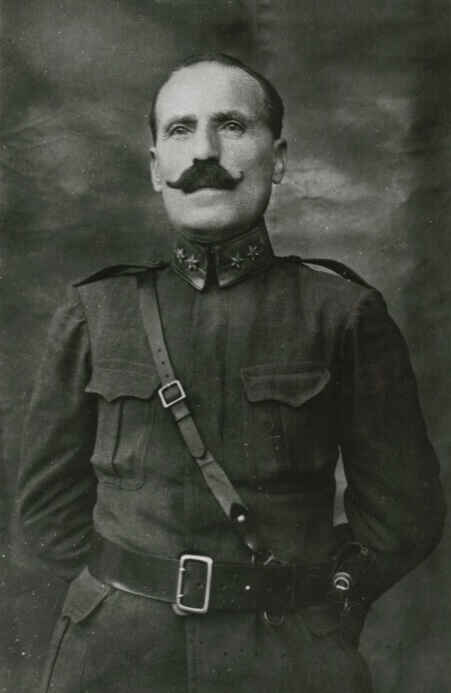

Minister of Internal Affairs of Albania
- In office 10 June 1924 – 23 December 1924
- Preceded by: Abdurrahman Dibra
- Succeeded by: Ahmet Zogu

Personal details
- Born: 1882 Prizren, Ottoman Empire
- Died: 1943 Tirana, Albanian Kingdom
- Profession: Politician, Army officer

Rexhep Shala (1882 – 1943) was an Albanian politician. He served as the minister of internal affairs of Albania.

== Life ==
He was born in Prizren in modern-day Kosovo. After graduating from school in his hometown, he moved to Istanbul, where he completed his studies at the military academy. In 1912, he left the Ottoman army and joined the government of Ismail Qemali. In July 1913, with the rank of captain, he organized the Albanian gendarmerie together with Dutch officers, taking command of the garrison in Vlorë. In 1919, he served as prefect in Durrës, and then in Shkodër. In 1919, he was sent to the Paris Peace Conference, where he was to present a report on Serbian hostile actions against Albanians.

In January 1920, as a delegate from Shkodra, he participated in the Congress of Lushnjë, which restored Albanian statehood. In 1921, he took part in the fighting against the Republic of Mirdita. He was later appointed as a commander of a battalion stationed in Tirana.

In June 1924, when an uprising against the legal authorities in Tirana broke out, Shala, as a lieutenant colonel, commanded the Shkodra garrison. He invited the conspirators to Shkodra to organize a session of the National Assembly there. In response, he was dismissed by Interior Minister Abdurrahman Dibra. Shala ignored the minister's decision, declared a state of emergency in Shkodra, and then joined the uprising. Together with his subordinates, he headed from Shkodra towards Tirana, which he entered on June 10, 1924. He was rewarded with the position of interior minister in Fan Noli's government. Unlike Fan Noli, Luigj Gurakuqi, and Bajram Curri, Shala opposed the Westernization of Albania and the division of landed peasants among the landed gentry. Together with Xhemal Bushati and Mustafa Kruja, in 1924 he co-founded the Radical Democratic Party. After Zogu came to power in December 1924, Shala fled the country and settled in Sarajevo. In exile, he collaborated with the National Union (Bashkimi Kombetar). He returned to Albania in 1942, during the Italian occupation, and died a year later.
