= National Inspectorate for Territorial Protection (Albania) =

Territorial inspection agency in Albania

- Inspektorati Kombëtar i Mbrojtjes së Territorit
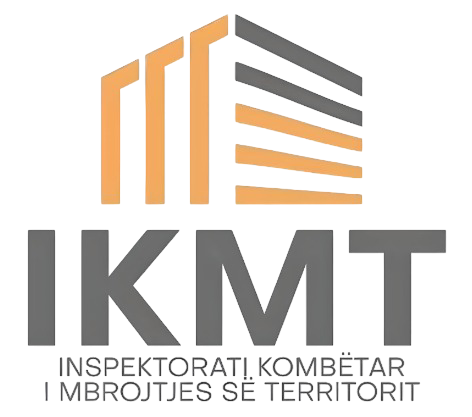

Agency overview
- Formed: 2007 (as INUK); Reorganized in 2015 as IKMT
- Jurisdiction: Albania
- Headquarters: Tirana, Albania
- Agency executive: Dallëndyshe Bici, Chief Inspector
- Parent department: Ministry of Internal Affairs
- Website: ikmt.gov.al

The National Inspectorate for Territorial Protection (Albanian: Inspektorati Kombëtar i Mbrojtjes së Territorit), abbreviated as IKMT, is a government agency in Albania that operates under the Ministry of Internal Affairs of Albania. It is responsible for enforcing national construction, land use, and environmental protection regulations throughout the country.

== History ==
The origins of the agency date back to 2007, when the National Urban Construction Inspectorate (Albanian: Inspektoriati Ndërtimor Urbanistik Kombëtar, abbreviated as INUK) was established to oversee construction activities and enforce urban planning regulations in Albania, pursuant to Law no. 9780, dated 16 July 2007.

In November 2015, the INUK was dissolved and its duties were transferred to the newly formed National Inspectorate for Territorial Protection (IKMT), formalized by Decision of the Council of Ministers No. 893, dated 4 November 2015. Since then, IKMT has operated as the national authority responsible for territorial protection, demolition of unauthorized constructions, and enforcement of urban and environmental regulations across Albania.

Since its establishment, IKMT has been involved in large-scale operations to clear unauthorized buildings, particularly in areas of environmental or cultural significance, such as national parks and coastal zones.

== Responsibilities ==
IKMT is tasked with:

- Monitoring and controlling the implementation of urban planning and land use regulations.
- Identifying and demolishing illegal constructions.
- Coordinating with local government units and the National Agency for Territorial Planning.
- Enforcing administrative and legal decisions concerning territorial protection.

== Structure ==
The agency is headed by a Director General and includes regional branches throughout Albania. It operates in close collaboration with law enforcement agencies when needed.

== See also ==
- Ministry of Internal Affairs (Albania)
