= Prasart Museum =

Museum in Bangkok, Thailand

Coordinates: 13.741959°N 100.65338°E

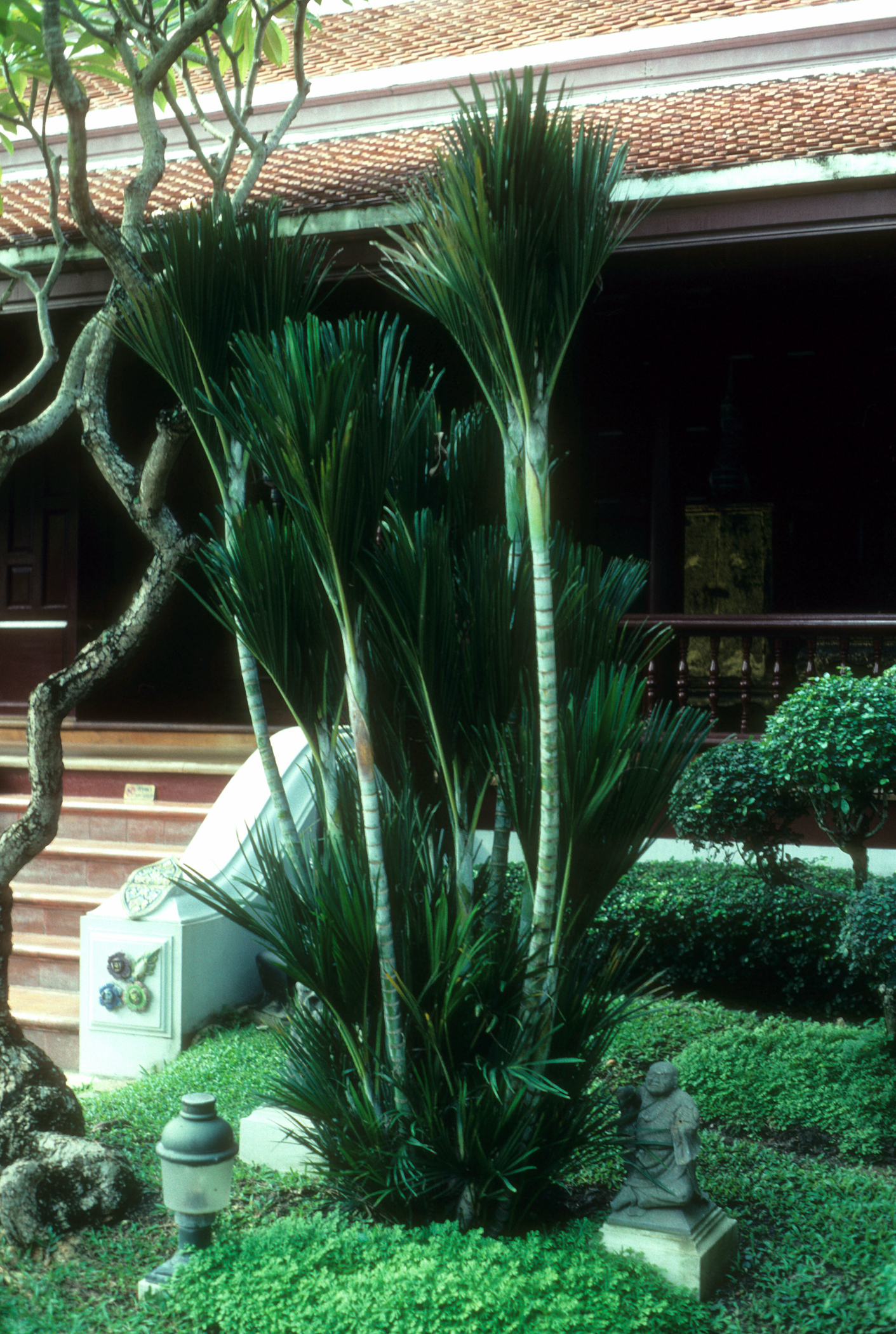
Dypsis Lutescens, A strange, strict form of a familiar cultivated palm at Prasart Museum

Prasart Museum is a private museum in Bang Kapi District, Bangkok that exhibits historic Thai antiques and artifacts. It also contains replicas of prominent Thai architecture.
