= ALUIZNI (Albania) =

Albanian government agency

- Agjencia e Legalizimit, Urbanizimit dhe Integrimit the Zonave dhe Ndertimeve Informale
- Official logo

Legalisation agency overview
- Jurisdiction: Albania
- Headquarters: Tirana
- Legalisation agency executive: Artan Lame, Director General
- Website: www.aluizni.gov.al

The Agency for Legalisation, Urbanisation and Integration of Informal Areas and Buildings (ALUIZNI) (Albanian: Agjencia e Legalizimit, Urbanizimit dhe Integrimit the Zonave dhe Ndertimeve Informale) is the government agency responsible for coordinating the legalization process in Albania. It has the authority to interpret and confirm decisions on legalisation permits and to coordinate inter-institutional action related to all informal construction activity present in the country.

== See also ==
- State Cadastre Agency
