= Directorate of Securing Classified Information =

Government agency of Albania

- Drejtoria e Sigurimit të Informacionit të Klasifikuar
- Official logo

Government agency overview
- Formed: 14 February 2001 (25 years ago)
- Jurisdiction: Council of Ministers
- Headquarters: Bulevardi “Dëshmorët e 4 Shkurtit”, Tirana, Albania
- Minister responsible: Edi Rama, Prime Minister
- Government agency executive: Ermal Jauri, Director General
- Website: www.nsa.gov.al

The Directorate of Securing Classified Information (Albanian: Drejtoria e Sigurimit të Informacionit të Klasifikuar – DSIK) is an agency of the Albanian government responsible for drafting policies and procedures for the provision of information classified as "state secret". Established based on law no. 8457, dated 11.2.1999 "On information classified as state secret" but later amended, the agency is a subordinate institution of the Prime Minister's Office.

== Overview ==
The Directorate of Securing Classified Information (DSIK) was created by order no. 742, dated 14.2.2001 of the Prime Minister. Originally tasked with drafting policies, programs and procedures for the provision of information classified as "state secret", the directorate has in later years contributed to the alignment of legislation conforming to NATO security standards on classified information by establishing a Registry System for the exchange of NATO classified information.

In 2016, the DSIK, pursuant to law no. 84/2016 "On the transitional re-evaluation of judges and prosecutors in the Republic of Albania", as a supervising authority became part of an important judicial process, where in collaboration with other relevant vetting institutions, examined the biographies of judges and prosecutors using three criteria: the legality of their assets; their professional standing; their possible links to organized crime.

== Directors ==
No.	Name	Term in office
1	Bajram Ibraj	2001	2004
2	Shyqyri Dekavelli	2004	2014
3	Arben Seferi	2014	2017
4	Dorian Tola	2017	2024
5	Altin Jani	2024	2026
6	Ermal Jauri	2026	Incumbent
