= Agron Musaraj =

Albanian politician

Agron Musaraj was the minister of the interior for Albania in the 1992 government of Sali Berisha. He is a member of the Democratic Party.
