= Ministry of Interior (Albania) =

Government ministry of Albania

Ministry of Internal Affairs
- Ministria e Punëve të Brendshme

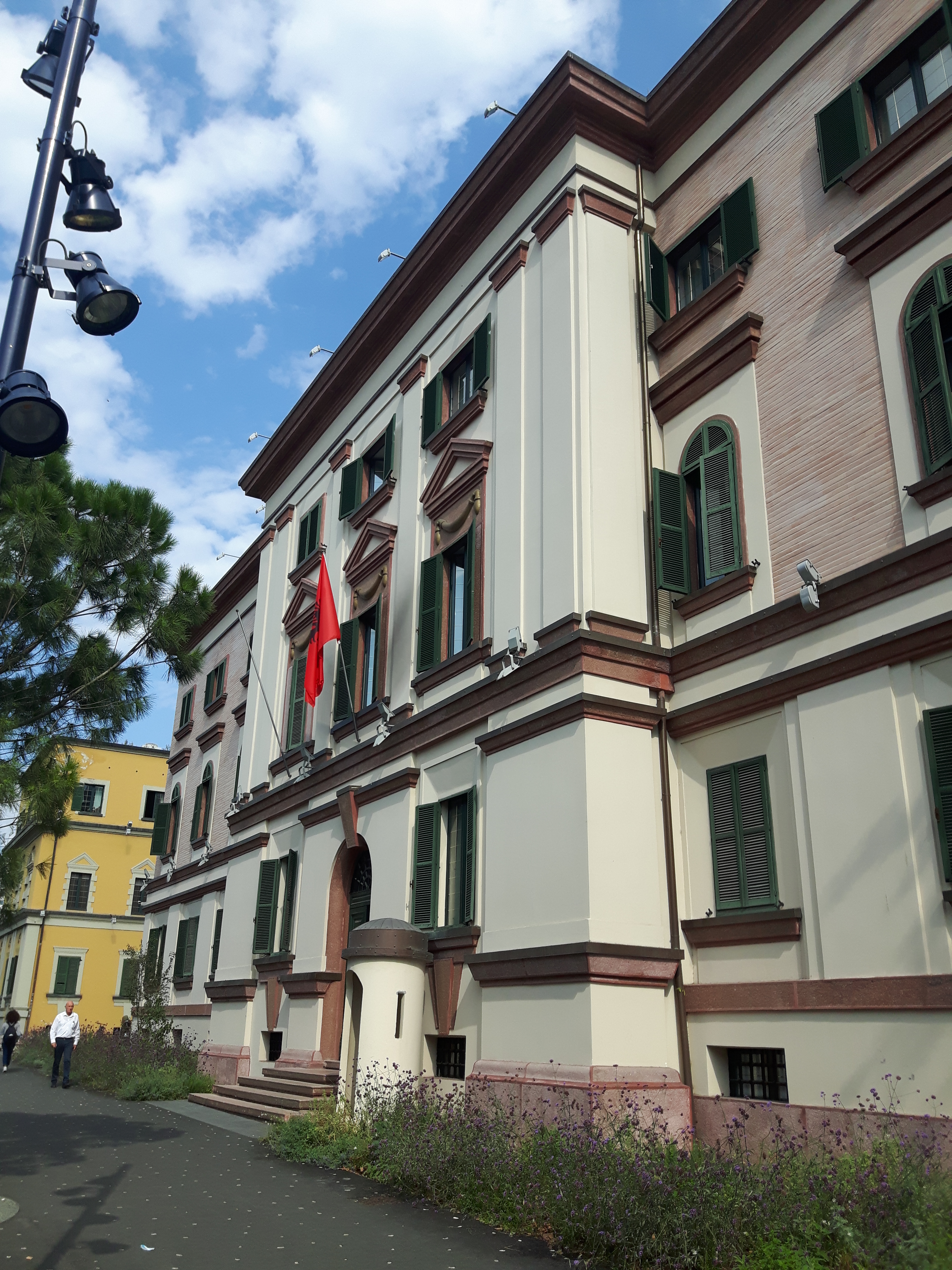

Department overview
- Formed: 4 December 1912; 113 years ago
- Jurisdiction: Council of Ministers
- Headquarters: Dëshmorët e Kombit Boulevard 1, 1001 Tirana, Albania
- Minister responsible: Ervin Demo
- Child Department: Albanian Police and Albanian Prefectures
- Website: mb.gov.al

The Ministry of Internal Affairs (Albanian: Ministria e Punëve të Brendshme) is a department of the Albanian Government, in charge of regulation for the protection of rights and liberties of Albanian citizens. Collaborating with the State Police, the ministry investigates unlawful acts against the interest of society and state, fights crime, provides civil order, ensures civil security, traffic safety, and protects the security and protection of important individuals.

== Reorganization ==
Since the establishment of the institution, the Ministry of Internal Affairs has undergone several administrative changes to its organizational structure. When a new department was formed, it often merged with the ministry thus expanding its role, subsequently leading to the name of the ministry being changed. If that department later broke off as a separate ministry or was dissolved, the ministry reverted to its original name. (Note: The title "Substitutive" (gheg albanian: Zavëndësisht), often using the acronym "Zav.", references to the temporary exercise of duty by an official who was not formally appointed by the prime minister but occupied the interim role of the vacant minister. These officials are labeled in the list with an asterisk.)

- Ministry of Internal Affairs (1912–1914; 1927–1939; 1943–1991; 2013–2017; 2025–present)
- Ministry of Internal Affairs and War (1914–1925)
- Ministry of Internal Affairs and Public Works (1925–1927)
- Minister State Secretary for Internal Affairs (1939–1943)
- Ministry of Public Order (1991–1994; 1998–2005)
- Ministry of Interior (1994–1998; 2005–2013; 2017–2025)

== Subordinate institutions ==
- State Police
- Republican Guard
- National Inspectorate for Territorial Protection
- Agency of Police Supervision
- Agency for the Administration of Seized and Confiscated Assets
- Administration Center of Transportation Services
- Recreation Center, Durrës
- Reception Center for Asylum Seekers

== Officeholders (1912–present) ==
No.	Name	Term in office
1	Mufid Libohova	4 December 1912	5 July 1913
2	Esad Toptani	5 July 1913	31 July 1913
3	Ismail Qemali	31 July 1913	5 September 1913
4	Hasan Prishtina	5 September 1913	20 November 1913
5	Fejzi Alizoti	20 November 1913	17 March 1914
–	Esad Toptani	18 March 1914	8 May 1914
–	Mufid Libohova	9 May 1914	28 May 1914
6	Aqif Elbasani	28 May 1914	5 October 1914
7	Shahin Dino	5 October 1914	27 January 1916
–	Mehdi Frashëri (Note: Mehdi Frashëri and Mufid Libohova served as delegates.)	25 December 1918	1 July 1919
–	Mufid Libohova	1 July 1919	29 January 1920
8	Ahmet Zogu	29 January 1920	14 November 1920
9	Fuad Dibra	15 November 1920	25 November 1920
10	Xhafer Ypi	25 November 1920	15 December 1920
11	Refik Toptani	15 December 1920	12 January 1921
–	Mehdi Frashëri	12 January 1921	11 July 1921
12	Sulejman Delvina	11 July 1921	18 October 1921
13	Bajram Fevziu	18 October 1921	5 December 1921
14	Luigj Gurakuqi	6 December 1921	12 December 1921
15	Rauf Fico	12 December 1921	24 December 1921
–	Ahmet Zogu	24 December 1921	25 November 1923
16	Sejfi Vllamasi	25 November 1923	7 December 1923
–	Rauf Fico	7 December 1923	14 December 1923
17	Rexhep Mitrovica	14 December 1923	28 December 1923
–	Sejfi Vllamasi	28 December 1923	3 March 1924
18	Shefqet Vërlaci	3 March 1924	27 May 1924
19	Abdurrahman Dibra	28 May 1924	10 June 1924
20	Rexhep Shala	16 June 1924	24 December 1924
–	Abdurrahman Dibra	24 December 1924	6 January 1925
–	Ahmet Zogu	6 January 1925	31 January 1925
21	Kostaq Kotta	1 February 1925	1 April 1925
22	Ceno Kryeziu	1 April 1925	23 September 1925
23	Musa Juka	28 September 1925	12 February 1927
–	Abdurrahman Dibra	12 February 1927	10 May 1928
–	Kostaq Kotta	11 May 1928	4 March 1930
–	Rauf Fico	4 March 1930	11 November 1930
–	Musa Juka	11 November 1930	7 October 1935
24	Et'hem Toto	21 October 1935	7 November 1936
–	Musa Juka	9 November 1936	6 April 1939
*	Zef Kadarja (Note: Zef Kadarja was member in charge.)	8 April 1939	12 April 1939
25	Maliq Bushati	12 April 1939	3 December 1941
*	Mustafa Merlika-Kruja (Note: Mustafa Merlika-Kruja served as substitutive minister.)	3 December 1941	4 January 1943
26	Ekrem Libohova	18 January 1943	23 January 1943
27	Fiqri Dine	23 January 1943	12 February 1943
28	Mark Gjon Markaj	12 February 1943	11 May 1943
29	Kol Bib Mirakaj	12 May 1943	5 September 1943
Interim Executive Committee (14 September 1943–4 November 1943)
30	Xhafer Deva	5 September 1943	16 June 1944
–	Fiqri Dine	16 July 1944	28 August 1944
*	Ibrahim Biçaku (Note: Ibrahim Biçaku served as substitutive minister.)	6 September 1944	23 October 1944
31	Haxhi Lleshi	23 October 1944	18 March 1946
32	Koçi Xoxe	22 March 1946	2 October 1948
33	Nesti Kerenxhi	2 October 1948	21 November 1948
34	Mehmet Shehu	23 November 1948	19 July 1954
35	Kadri Hazbiu	19 July 1954	27 December 1979
36	Feçor Shehu	27 December 1979	14 January 1982
37	Hekuran Isai	15 January 1982	1 February 1989
38	Simon Stefani	2 February 1989	6 July 1990
–	Hekuran Isai	8 July 1990	21 February 1991
39	Gramoz Ruçi	22 February 1991	10 May 1991
40	Aredin Shyti	11 May 1991	4 June 1991
41	Bajram Yzeiri	11 June 1991	6 December 1991
42	Vladimir Hysi	18 December 1991	13 April 1992
43	Bashkim Kopliku	19 April 1992	6 April 1993
44	Agron Musaraj	6 April 1993	11 July 1996
45	Halit Shamata	11 July 1996	3 March 1997
46	Belul Çelo → Lush Perpali (co-signer) (Note: The latter served as Secretary of State (Co-signing Minister))	12 March 1997	4 July 1997
47	Ali Kazazi → Lush Perpali (co-signer)	4 July 1997	24 July 1997
48	Neritan Ceka → Ndre Legisi (co-signer)	25 July 1997	23 April 1998
49	Perikli Teta	24 April 1998	29 September 1998
50	Petro Koçi	2 October 1998	19 May 1999
51	Spartak Poçi	19 May 1999	9 November 2000
52	Ilir Gjoni	9 November 2000	29 January 2002
53	Stefan Çipa	22 February 2002	27 July 2002
54	Luan Rama	29 July 2002	17 October 2003
55	Igli Toska	17 October 2003	10 September 2005
56	Sokol Olldashi	11 September 2005	18 January 2007
*	Gjergj Lezhja → (acting deputy minister)	18 January 2007	20 March 2007
57	Bujar Nishani	20 March 2007	17 September 2009
58	Lulzim Basha	18 September 2009	21 April 2011
–	Bujar Nishani	21 April 2011	22 June 2012
59	Flamur Noka	3 July 2012	15 September 2013
60	Saimir Tahiri	15 September 2013	19 March 2017
61	Fatmir Xhafaj	24 March 2017	22 May 2017
62	Dritan Demiraj	22 May 2017	13 September 2017
–	Fatmir Xhafaj	13 September 2017	27 October 2018
63	Sandër Lleshaj	23 November 2018	17 December 2020
64	Bledar Çuçi	18 December 2020	13 July 2023
65	Taulant Balla	15 July 2023	30 July 2024
66	Ervin Hoxha	30 July 2024	19 September 2025
67	Albana Koçiu	19 September 2025	26 February 2026
68	Besfort Lamallari	6 March 2026	11 September 2026
69	Ervin Demo	11 September 2026	"Incumbent"

== See also ==
- Albanian Police
