= State Authority for Geospatial Information =

Government agency of Albania

- Autoriteti Shtetëror për Informacionin Gjeohapësinor

Agency overview
- Formed: 2012
- Jurisdiction: Albania
- Headquarters: Tirana
- Website: asig.gov.al

The State Authority for Geospatial Information (ASIG) (Albanian: Autoriteti Shtetëror për Informacionin Gjeohapësinor) is an Albanian state owned central agency responsible for surveying, mapping and land registering the territory of the Republic of Albania. The agency is under the supervision of the Prime Minister's Office.

ASIG's main objective is the creation of a geodetic framework to enable the support of a unique map covering the territory of Albania. Through its geoportal, it aims to establish a national infrastructure geospatial database that is accessible to anyone.
