= Khlong Chan =

Coordinates: 13.764675°N 100.643039°E

Khlong Chan คลองจั่น
- Khwaeng
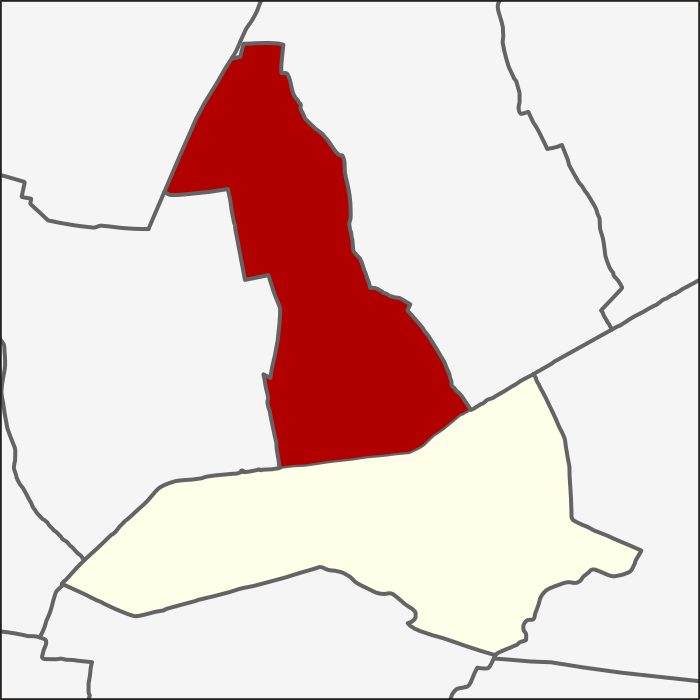
- Location in Bang Kapi District
- Country: Thailand
- Province: Bangkok
- Khet: Bang Kapi

Area
  - Total: 12.062 km^{2} (4.657 sq mi)

Population (2020)
  - Total: 76,934
- Time zone: UTC+7 (ICT)
- Postal code: 10240
- TIS 1099: 100601

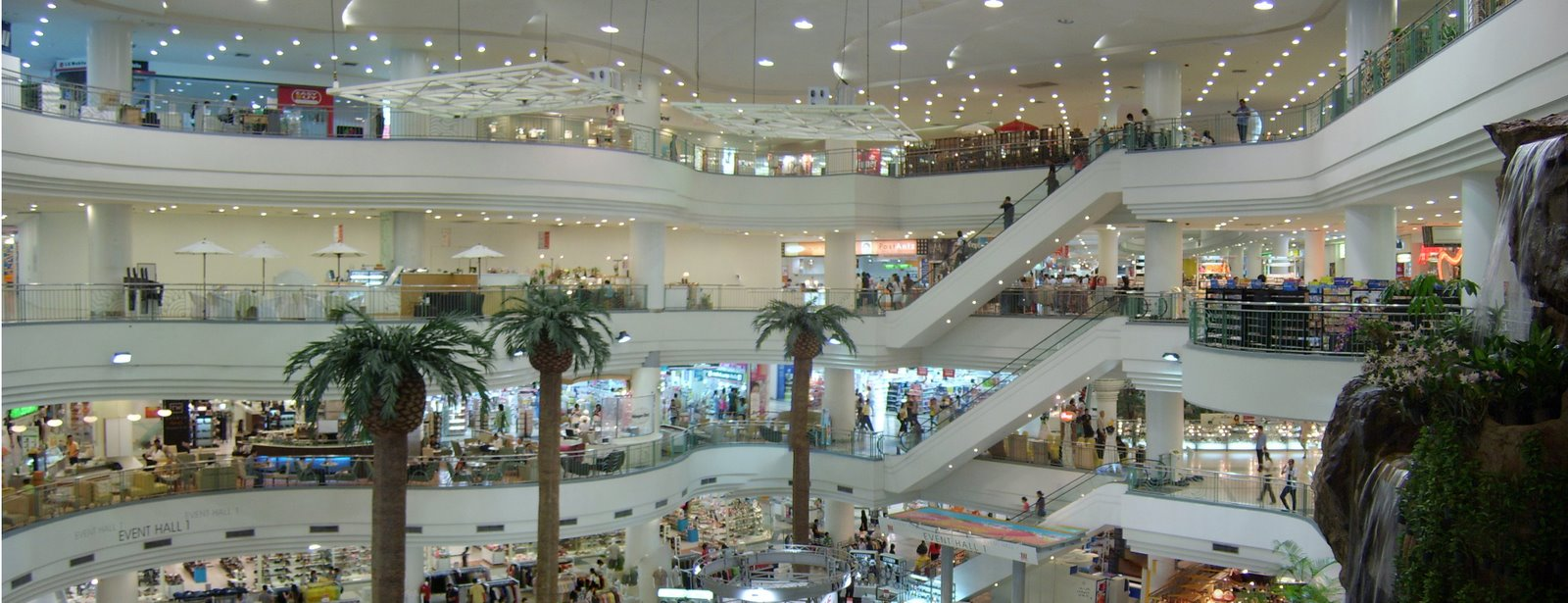
The Mall Bangkapi also known as The Mall 8 Bangkapi

Khlong Chan (Thai: คลองจั่น, pronounced [kʰlɔ̄ːŋ t͡ɕàn]) is a neighbourhood in Bangkok, also a khwaeng (sub-district) of Bang Kapi District, Bangkok.

== Toponymy ==
Khlong Chan is the name of a tributary of Khlong Saen Saep canal. The longest khlong (canal) in Thailand that flows from the downtown Bangkok to the eastern part at province of Chachoengsao which flows through the area of Bang Kapi.

The name Khlong Chan was likely derived from the Thai common name for Millettia brandisianatrees (Chan), which lined both sides of the canal banks along its route.

== Geography ==
Khlong Chan is an area in the southeast of Bangkok and is the northern part of Bang Kapi District.

The area bounded by other areas (from the north clockwise): Nawamin in Bueng Kum District, Khlong Kum in Bueng Kum District, Hua Mak in its district, Phlabphla in Wang Thonglang District, and Wang Thonglang in Wang Thonglang District, with Lat Phrao in Lat Phrao District.

== Places ==
- Bang Kapi District Office
- Happy Land
- The Mall Bangkapi
- Makro Lat Phrao
- Tawanna Market
- Vejthani Hospital
- National Housing Authority
