= Abdurrahman Dibra =

Albanian politician

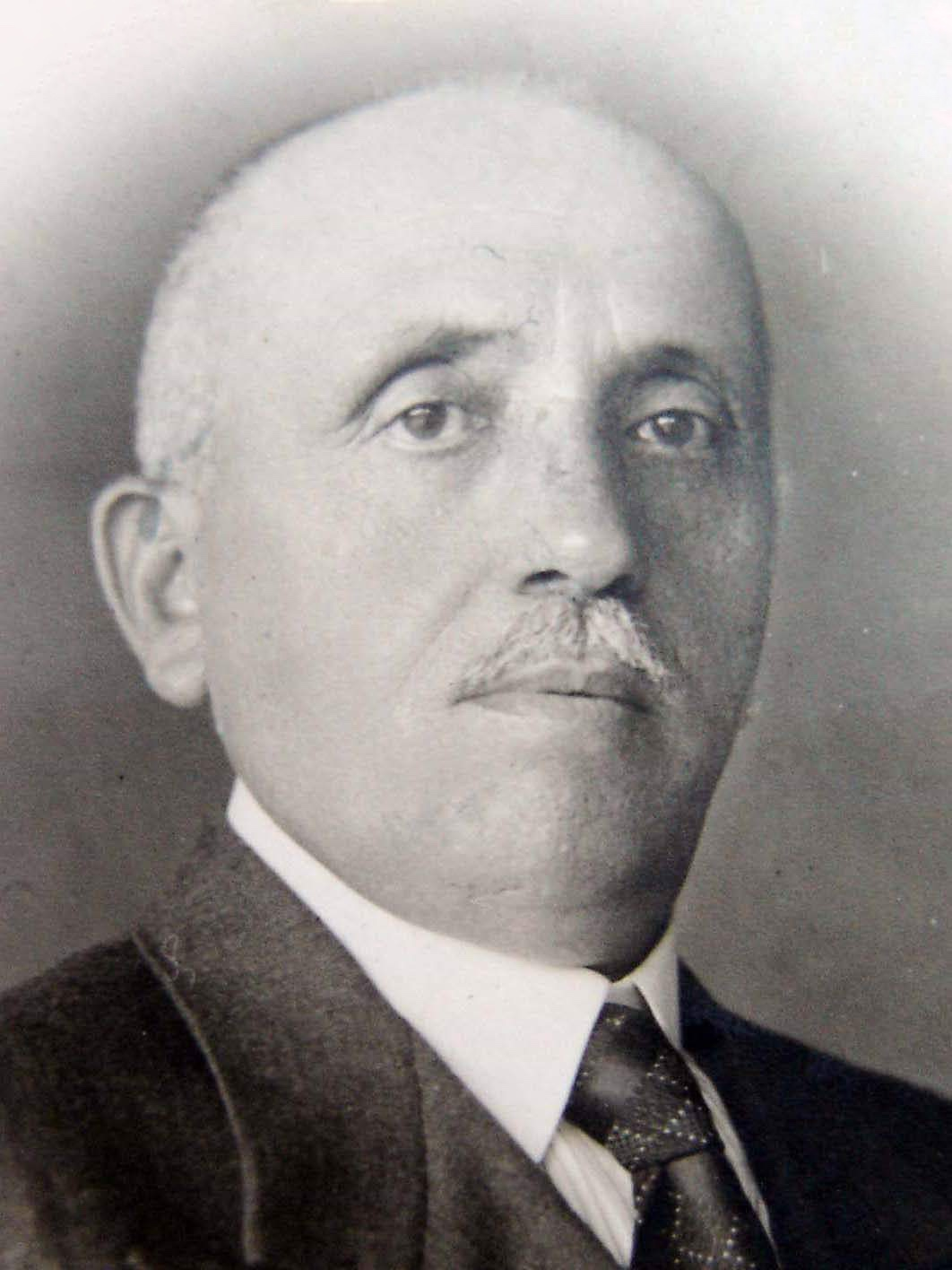

20th, 22nd and 25th Minister of Internal Affairs of Albania
- In office 28 May 1924 – 10 June 1924
- Prime Minister: Shefqet Vërlaci; Iliaz Vrioni
- Preceded by: Shefqet Vërlaci
- Succeeded by: Rexhep Shala
- In office 25 December 1924 – 6 January 1925
- President: Ahmet Zogu
- Preceded by: Rexhep Shala
- Succeeded by: Ahmet Zogu
- In office 12 February 1927 – 10 May 1928
- President: Ahmet Zogu
- Preceded by: Musa Juka
- Succeeded by: Kostaq Kotta

Personal details
- Born: 1885 Debar, Ottoman Empire
- Died: February 1961 (aged 75–76) Tirana, Albania
- Party: Legality Movement Party

Abdurrahman Dibra (1885 – 1961) was an Albanian politician. He was born in Debar in modern-day North Macedonia. He served under various ministries of the Albanian government including Minister of Finance. In the early 1910s as an Ottoman governor of the area of Neveska (modern Nymphaio) he instigated the assassination of the guerrilla leader Spiro Bellkameni.

== Life ==
Abdurrahman Dibra was born in 1885 in the city of Dibra, today North Macedonia, where his father Elmaz Dibra, at that time served as treasurer of the Municipality. Of Elmaz Dibra's three sons, only the eldest, Abdurrahman, became famous for his political activity, while the other two, Xhevdeti and Rahimi, had a life quite different from that of their brother. After finishing primary school in his hometown, Abdurrahman continued his secondary education in the city of Monastir (today Bitola) and then went to the capital of the Ottoman Empire, to pursue higher studies. He enrolled in Mekteb-i Mülkiye (modern Faculty of Political Sciences of Ankara University), which he graduated with honors in 1907 as one of the best students of that branch. Seeing his high results, the Sublime Porte appointed him to the local Ottoman administration and after a short time by decree of the Sultan, he was appointed to the post of deputy prefect of Istanbul. During the years that Abdurrahman studied in Istanbul, he stayed in a room with a compatriot boy from Mati, Ahmet Zogu, who was ten years younger than him. Since then they developed a close friendship with each other, and in 1920 when Zogu was appointed Minister of the Interior, he called on Abdurrahman to leave Istanbul and return to Albania, which already had declared independence in 1912 from the Ottoman Empire. Abdurrahman responded positively to his invitation and in the spring of 1920, he went to Albania and immediately met with Zog.
