= Artan Lame =

Albanian publicist, historian, and politician (1967–2025)

General Director of the State Cadastre Agency
- In office 2019–2023

General Director of Aluizni
- In office 2013–2019

Deputy Minister of Tourism and Environment
- In office 2002–2005

Deputy Mayor of Tirana
- In office 2000–2002

General Director of Cultural Heritage at the Ministry of Culture
- In office 1999–2000

Personal details
- Born: 1967 Tirana, PR Albania
- Died: May 22, 2025 (aged 58) Munich, Germany
- Profession: Publicist, historian, civil servant

Artan Lame (1967–2025) was an Albanian publicist, historian, and politician. From 2019 to 2023, he served as the General Director of the State Cadastre Agency of Albania. He held various positions in public administration and was active in fields related to cultural heritage, urban development, and territorial regulation.

== Career ==
Lame held several positions in Albanian public administration. From 1999 to 2000, he served as Director of Cultural Heritage at the Ministry of Culture. Between 2000 and 2002, he was Deputy Mayor of Tirana. From 2002 to 2005, he served as Deputy Minister of Territory and Tourism.

In 2013, Lame was appointed Director General of the Agency for Legalization, Urbanization, and Integration of Informal Zones (ALUIZNI). He held this position until 2019, except for a brief interruption in 2017. During that year, as part of a political agreement between the Socialist Party and the Democratic Party amid political protests and negotiations, Lame was temporarily replaced by Ibrahim Morina, a technical director proposed by the opposition. Morina resigned after a few months, and Lame returned to his position later in 2017.

In 2019, Lame became Director General of the newly established State Cadastre Agency (ASHK), a position he held until 2023. In addition to his administrative roles, Lame was active in the Socialist Party, serving as a member of its National Assembly and contributing to the drafting of the party's program between 2011 and 2013. He was also a candidate for parliamentary elections in 2005, 2009, and 2013.

== Publications ==
- Tirana in postcards until 1944 (co-author), Tirana 2000
- Albanian medals (1914–1944), Vol. I, Tirana 2010
- Albanian medals (1945–2002), Vol. II, Tirana 2010
- Tirana: Planning, Building, Living (co-author), Vienna 2011
- Prince of the Albanians, Tirana 2011
- The Pyramid of Tirana (with Ardian Klosi), Tirana 2011

He also wrote weekly columns, including "Shqipni e harrume" in *Java* magazine (2005–2013) and "Shqipni tavolinash" in the newspaper *Shqip* (2006–2013).

== Exhibitions ==
- Albanian Uniforms, Tirana, 2002
- 50 Less, Tirana, 2011
- Albanian Maps (with Artan Shkreli), Brussels, 2012
- Albanian Flags, various cities, 2012
- Meeting of Worlds, Tirana, 2014
- Albanian Flags, Korçë, 2016

== Academic and Cultural Involvement ==
Lame was vice president of the Albanian Collectors Federation and a member of international collectors' clubs. He directed the Albanian Heritage Center and was a lecturer at the "Marin Barleti" University.

== Awards and Recognitions ==
In 2010, Lame received the international “Book of the Year” award by MIC London for his work “Albanian Medals 1914–2002”. In 2012, the President of the Republic awarded him the “Medal of Gratitude” for his contribution to the 100th anniversary of Albania's Independence.

== Death ==
Lame died on 23 May 2025 in Munich, Germany, at the age of 58, following complications from heart surgery.
