= Agency for the Delivery of Integrated Services (Albania) =

Government agency of Albania

Agency for the Delivery of Integrated Services Albania
- Agjencia e Ofrimit të Shërbimeve Publike të Integruara
- Official logo

Government agency overview
- Formed: 22 October 2014 (11 years ago)
- Jurisdiction: Council of Ministers
- Headquarters: Bulevardi “Zhan d’ Ark”, ish Hoteli i Oficerëve, Kati 6, Tirana, Albania
- Minister responsible: Edi Rama, Prime Minister
- Government agency executive: Angelo Koleka, Director General
- Website: www.adisa.gov.al

The Agency for the Delivery of Integrated Services Albania (ADISA; Albanian: Agjencia e Ofrimit të Shërbimeve Publike të Integruara) is an agency of the Albanian government created to improve and facilitate the experience of ordinary citizens in the provision and use of public services. The agency is a subordinate institution of the Prime Minister's Office.

== Overview ==
The Agency for the Delivery of Integrated Services Albania was established on 22 October 2014, pursuant to Article 100 of the Constitution, Article 10 of Law no. 9000, dated 30.1.2003, "On the organization and functioning of the Council of Ministers", Article 6, of Law no. 90/2012, "On the organization and functioning of the state administration", and articles 10 and 11, of Law no. 185/2013, "On the 2014 budget" (amended), following the proposal of the Minister of State for Innovation and Public Administration, Milena Harito, the Council of Ministers approved the creation of the Center for the Provision of Integrated Public Services, as a public legal institution, under the supervision of the Minister of State for Innovation and Public Administration, with headquarters in Tirana.

ADISA was formed as a necessity to provide Albanian citizens with efficient, qualitative and transparent public services. It was tasked with the provision of public services through the establishment and administration of one-stop integrated public services centers (one-stop shop) which provide services at integrated counters for citizens and by applying various monitoring instruments to ensure the quality of the services delivered.
