= State Cadastre Agency (Albania) =

Government agency of Albania

- Agjencia Shtetërore e Kadastrës

Agency overview
- Formed: 1 February 2019
- Jurisdiction: Albania
- Headquarters: Tirana
- Agency executive: Lorena Goxhobelli, General Director
- Website: www.ashk.gov.al

The State Cadastre Agency (ASHK) (Albanian: Agjencia Shtetërore e Kadastrës) is an Albanian governmental agency created to address the issues of legalization, restitution and registration of housing and all immovable properties throughout the territory of Albania. The agency was formed by law No.111/2018 of the Albanian Parliament that resulted in the merger of ALUIZNI, the National Housing Authority and the Immovable Property Registration Office. Its current director is Lorena Goxhobelli replacing Dallëndyshe Bici.
