= Ervin Hoxha =

Albanian politician (born 1978)

Minister of the Interior
- In office 30 July 2024 – 19 September 2025
- President: Bajram Begaj
- Prime Minister: Edi Rama
- Preceded by: Taulant Balla
- Succeeded by: Albana Koçiu

Personal details
- Born: 13 October 1978 (age 47)
- Party: Socialist Party

Ervin Hoxha (born 13 October 1978) is an Albanian politician and member of the Socialist Party. He served as the Minister of the Interior of Albania from 2024 to September 2025. From 2023 to 2024, he served as Director of the National Inspectorate of Territory Protection of Albania.
