= Albana Koçiu =

Albanian politician (born 1977)

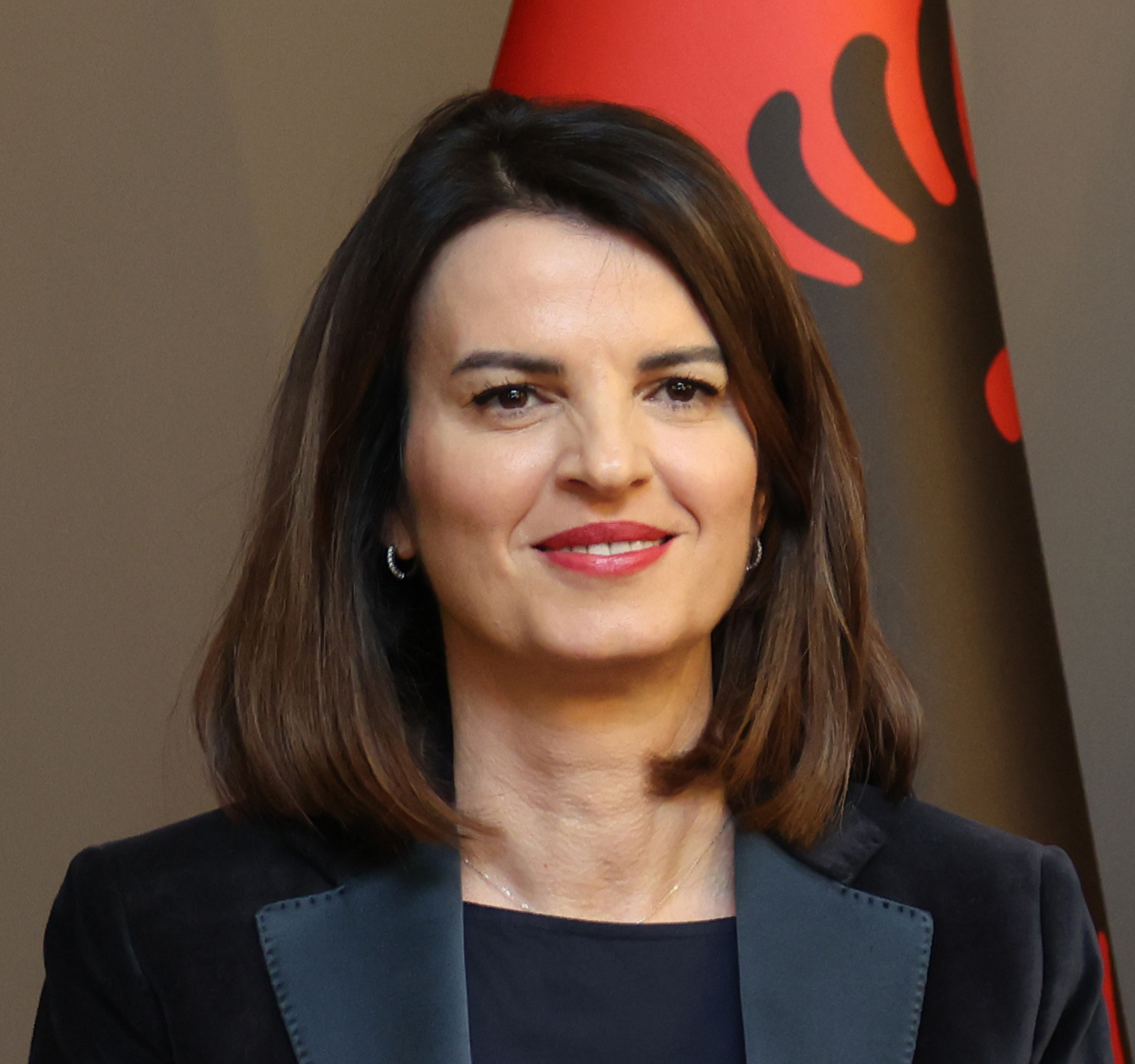
- Koçiu in 2026

Deputy Prime Minister of Albania
- Incumbent
- Assumed office 6 March 2026
- President: Bajram Begaj
- Prime Minister: Edi Rama
- Preceded by: Belinda Balluku

Minister of Internal Affairs
- In office 19 September 2025 – 6 March 2026
- President: Bajram Begaj
- Prime Minister: Edi Rama
- Preceded by: Ervin Hoxha
- Succeeded by: Besfort Lamallari

Minister of Health and Social Protection
- In office 4 September 2023 – 19 September 2025
- President: Bajram Begaj
- Prime Minister: Edi Rama
- Preceded by: Ogerta Manastirliu
- Succeeded by: Evis Sala

Personal details
- Born: July 10, 1977 (age 49) Tirana, PSR Albania
- Education: University of Tirana
- Profession: Politician, academic

Albana Koçiu (born 10 July 1977) is an Albanian politician who served as the Minister of Internal Affairs of Albania from September 2025 to March 2026. She previously served as the Minister of Health and Social Protection from September 2023 to September 2025.

== Early life and education ==
Albana Koçiu was born on 10 July 1977 in Tirana, Albania. She attained a bachelor's degree from the Faculty of Social Sciences at the University of Tirana in 2000, followed by a Master of Science in 2007.

== Career ==
Prior to her appointment as minister, Koçiu served as Director of the Department of Public Administration, a role she held from 2013. During her tenure, Koçiu led a series of reforms in public administration, with a focus on improving organizational structures, raising professional standards, and aligning Albania's legal framework with that of the European Union. Her contributions were recognized at the regional level, leading to her nomination as a member of the Governing Board of the Regional School of Public Administration for the Western Balkans (RESPA), a role she held until her ministerial appointment.

In 2001, she joined the Municipality of Tirana as Director of the Human Resources Directorate. She later served as Director of the Economic Center for the Development and Education of Children (2007–2008) and as Director General of the General Directorate for Service Management (2008–2011).

From 2010 to 2022, Koçiu also held an academic position as an associate professor in the Department of Social Sciences at the University of Tirana.

In September 2023, Koçiu was appointed as Minister of Health by Prime Minister Edi Rama.
