= National Housing Authority (Thailand) =

State enterprise of Thailand

- การเคหะแห่งชาติ

Agency overview
- Formed: February 12, 1973; 53 years ago
- Preceding agency: Government Housing Office, Department of Public Welfare
- Type: State Enterprise
- Headquarters: 905 Nawamin Road, Khlong Chan Subdistrict, Bang Kapi District, Bangkok
- Annual budget: 868,936,000 million baht
- Agency executive: Thaweephong Wichaidit, Governor
- Website: www.nha.co.th

National Housing Authority (Thai: การเคหะแห่งชาติ) it is a state enterprise under the Ministry of Social Development and Human Security, established on February 12, 1973.

== History ==
Due to the housing problems for low-income earners in Thailand after World War II, the government of Field Marshal Plaek Phibunsongkhram (first term) established the Housing Division, Department of Public Welfare in 1940. After the National Economic and Social Development Plan began in 1961, the housing problems for low-income earners became more severe. The governments of Field Marshal Plaek Phibunsongkhram (second term) and Field Marshal Sarit Thanarat established additional agencies related to solving housing problems, including the Government Housing Office, Department of Public Welfare (1950), the GH Bank (1953), and the Bangkok Municipality Slum Improvement Office (1960). Until the period of the 3rd National Economic and Social Development Plan, a policy was set to establish an agency responsible for housing. Then on December 13, 1972, the Revolutionary Council under the leadership of Field Marshal Thanom Kittikachorn issued Revolutionary Council Announcement No. 316, establishing the National Housing Authority, which came into effect 60 days after its announcement in the Royal Gazette, on February 12, 1973. With the following objectives:

1. Provide housing for the public, for rent or hire purchase.
2. Provide loans to build houses for the public, hire purchase or provide financial assistance to individuals who wish to build houses.
3. Engaged in business related to building construction or land allocation.

Later on June 26, 1974, the Act Amending Revolutionary Council Announcement No. 316 was promulgated, which gave the National Housing Authority the authority to issue bonds or investment instruments.
