= Bang Kapi district =

Bang Kapi บางกะปิ
- Khet
- Khet location in Bangkok

- Location in Thailand
- Coordinates: 13°45′57″N 100°38′52″E
- Country: Thailand
- Province: Bangkok
- Seat: Khlong Chan
- Khwaeng: 2

Area
  - Total: 28.523 km^{2} (11.013 sq mi)

Population (2017)
  - Total: 147,800
  - Density: 5,181.78/km^{2} (13,420.7/sq mi)
- Time zone: UTC+7 (ICT)
- Postal code: 10240 except Muban Seri: 10250
- Geocode: 1006

Bang Kapi (Thai: บางกะปิ, pronounced [bāːŋ kāpìʔ]) is one of the 50 districts (khet) of Bangkok, Thailand. Bang Kapi is also popularly known as Bang Kapi or Ramkhamhaeng. It is bounded by other Bangkok districts (from north clockwise): Bueng Kum, Saphan Sung, Prawet, Suan Luang, Huai Khwang, Wang Thonglang, and Lat Phrao.

Bang Kapi is the main hub for sports and recreation in Bangkok, primarily anchored by the expansive Bang Kapi Sports Complex managed by the Sports Authority of Thailand.

== Name ==
The name Bang Kapi consists of two parts. Bang is a common prefix for place names in Thailand and roughly means a "hamlet by the waterfront". There are multiple theories as to the origin of kapi. The word kapi itself exists in Thai and means "shrimp paste", which is one possible origin. Another possibility is that it comes from kabi (กบิ/กบี่), a poetic word meaning "monkey", as the area used to be heavily forested and was home to many monkeys. Lastly, it could also come from kapiyoh (กะปิเยาะห์), the Thai word for a type of cap worn by Islamic men (taqiyah), as many Muslims settled in the area.

== History ==
The area of Bang Kapi has a history dating back to Rama III's reign, when Chao Phraya Bodindecha (เจ้าพระยาบดินทรเดชา) led a troop to fight rebels in Champassack and Louangphabang and brought back people to settle.

As it grew into a larger town, Bang Kapi was made an amphoe (district) of Phra Nakhon province. The district was originally quite large, but has been divided since then to form new districts.

In 1966, Huay Khwang sub-district (tambon) and parts of the Bang Kapi sub-district were spun off to form Phaya Thai district.

In 1972, Phra Nakhon and Thonburi were joined as the single province, Bangkok. The title of districts and sub-districts in the capital city were changed from amphoe and tambon to khet and khwaeng, respectively. Bang Kapi became a district of the newly combined province, having at that time nine sub-districts.

In 1977, Sam Sen Nok sub-district was moved to Huai Khwang district.

In 1989, Lat Phrao district and Bueng Kum district were separated from Bang Kapi and became new districts.

On 14 October 1997, Wang Thonglang sub-district was elevated to a district, taking part of Khlong Chan sub-district with it.

== Upcoming Developments ==
Bang Kapi is poised to be a major transportation hub with 4 Metro Lines and the Airport Rail Link traversing the area. Upcoming developments such as the MRT Orange Line, MRT Brown Line and MRT Grey Line are slated to further enhance connectivity in Bang Kapi / Ramkhamhaeng.

MRT Orange Line

=== MRT Orange Line ===
Bang Kapi has been earmarked as a key transportation hub for Bangkok. The MRT Orange Line is undergoing construction and is split into Eastern and Western sections. The Eastern and Western sections are slated for opening in 2028 and 2030 respectively.

When fully completed, the MRT Orange line will be 35.9 km (22.3 mi) long with 29 stations (7 stations will be elevated for 8.9 km (5.5 mi) and 22 will be underground for 27 km (16.8 mi)), including an interchange with the current Thailand Cultural Centre Station of MRT Blue Line.

MRT Orange Line Stations within the Bang Kapi Area:

- Ramkhamhaeng 12 Station
- Ramkhamhaeng University Station
- SAT Station
- Ramkhamhaeng 40 Station
- Yaek Lam Sali Station

The MRT Orange Line aims to unite Eastern, Central and Western Bangkok on a unified single line and is projected to have a ridership forecast of 440,000 passenger per day on service launch date.

Key stations on the line include:

- Min Buri / Yak Lam Sali Interchange (with MRT Yellow Line and MRT Brown Line)
- MRTA Station (Royal City Avenue Nightlife)
- Thailand Cultural Center Interchange (with MRT Blue Line)
- Ratchapraprop Interchange (with Airport Rail Link and SRT Eastern Line)
- Ratchathewi Interchange (with BTS)
- Yommarat /Chinatown Station
- Democracy Monument Interchange (with MRT Purple Line)
- Sanam Luang (Grand Palace, Sanam Luang, Khaosan Road, National Theater)
- Bang Khun Non Interchange (with MRT Blue Line)

The MRT Orange Line is divided into two sections: the 22.5 km (14.0 mi) Eastern Section, running from Yaek Rom Klao to Thailand Cultural Centre, and the 13.4 km (8.3 mi) Western Section, extending from Thailand Cultural Centre to Bang Khun Non.

=== MRT Grey Line ===
The Grey Line is a planned monorail line in the north of Bangkok to be built from Watcharaphon to Thong Lo. The route would provide a vital north - south link for a distance of 16.25 km with 15 planned stations and is expected to cost 29.1 billion baht. The line would support the growth of residential areas around Pradit Monutham Road and Kaset-Namawin road corridors and is forecast to eventually have 370,000 passengers per day. The BMA Grey will interchange with other lines including the MRT Pink Line, the proposed MRT Brown Line, the MRT Yellow Line, MRT Orange Line (under construction) and BTS Sukhumvit Line.

The Cabinet Approval for Construction Phase 1 is expected to be in August 2028. The construction start date is estimated to start in July 2030 with an operating start date in October 2033.

The route has a total of 15 planned stations. A number of station working names were changed by the Department of Rail Transport in August 2022 to better reflect localities of the stations.

For the potential Phase 2 & 3 sections, 25 stations are proposed. (Note: The Bangkok BRT would be replaced along this section) .

Code	Station Name	District	Transfers
Watcharaphon - Thong Lo (Phase 1)
GY01	Vacharaphol		MRT Vacharaphol
GY02	Yu Yen		
GY03	Pradit Manutham 27		MRT (design phase)
GY04	Pradit Manutham 25		
GY05	Yothin Phatthana		
GY06	Pradit Manutham 15		
GY07	Sangkhom Songkhro		
GY08	Lat Phrao 71		MRT Lat Phrao 71
GY09	Si Wara		
GY10	Medical Development Center		
GY11	Wat Phra Ram 9		MRT (Under construction) Wat Phra Ram 9
GY12	Petchaburi 47		SRT (planned)
GY13	Cham Chan		
GY14	Charoensuk		
GY15	Thong Lo		BTS Thong Lo
Potential Phase 2 & 3 South Section (Phra Khanong - Tha Phra)
GY16	Phra Khanong		BTS Sukhumvit Line: Phra Khanong
GY17	Ban Kluai Tai		
GY18	Kluai Nam Thai		
GY19	Yaek Kasem Rat		
GY20	Queen Sirikit National Conventional Centre		MRT Blue Line: Queen Sirikit National Conventional Centre
GY21	Khlong Toei		MRT Blue Line: Khlong Toei
GY22	Ngam Du Phli		
GY23	Lumphini		MRT Blue Line: Lumphini
GY24	Suan Phlu		
GY25	Chong Nonsi		BTS Silom Line: Chong Nonsi
GY26	Thungmahamek		
GY27	Rajamangala University of Technology Krungthep		
GY28	Nang Linchi		
GY29	Ratchada-Narathiwat		
GY30	Yannawa		
GY31	Phra Ram 3		
GY32	Khlong Phum		
GY33	Khlong Dan		
GY34	Sathupradit		
GY35	Rama IX Bridge		
GY36	Charoenrat		
GY37	Bang Ko Laem		
GY38	Mahaisawan		MRT Purple Line: Samre (Under construction)
GY39	Talat Phlu		BTS Silom Line: Talat Phlu
GY40	Tha Phra		MRT Blue Line: Tha Phra

=== MRT Brown Line ===
The MRT Brown Line is a 22.1 km proposed monorail mass transit line in Bangkok, Thailand from Nonthaburi Civic Centre, Nonthaburi Province to Lam Sali intersection, Bang Kapi District. 20 stations are proposed for the line and the expected cost for the project is 48 billion baht. The MRT Brown line will interchange with 7 other mass transit lines.

The MRT Brown Line feasibility study is to be completed by late-2025 with submission to the Cabinet in early 2026, with bidding for the line expected in late-2026. Cabinet approval is expected in July 2027 with a construction start date in February 2029 and a completion date of February 2032.

The 22.1 km Brown line is proposed to have 20 stations:

Note: Station names are provisional.

Code	Station Name	Transfers	Province
BR01	Nonthaburi Civic Center	MRT MRT	Nonthaburi
BR02	Khae Rai		Nonthaburi
BR03	Khlong Yat Lao (Ngam Wong Wan 12)		Bangkok
BR04	Pracha Chuen intersection		Bangkok
BR05	Chinnakhet		Bangkok
BR06	Bang Khen	SRT Bang Khen Station	Bangkok
BR07	Kasetsart University (Gate 2)		Bangkok
BR08	Kasetsart University	BTS Kasetsart University	Bangkok
BR09	Bang Bua		Bangkok
BR10	Lat Pla Khao		Bangkok
BR11	Prasoet Manu Kit 18		Bangkok
BR12	Sukhonthasawat		Bangkok
BR13	Chalong Rat	MRL Kaset Nawamin (proposed)	Bangkok
BR14	Khlong Lamchiak		Bangkok
BR15	Nuan Chan 11		Bangkok
BR16	Yaek Nawamin		Bangkok
BR17	Inthrarak		Bangkok
BR18	Nawamin Phirom		Bangkok
BR19	Seri Thai/Khlong Chan Stadium		Bangkok
BR20	Yaek Lam Sali	MRT (under construction) MRT	Bangkok

== Shopping ==
=== Shopping ===
Bang Kapi's economy is predominantly anchored in retail and services, which form the backbone of local commercial activity and employ a significant portion of the workforce. Bang Kapi is home to 4 major shopping malls (The Mall Ramkhamhaeng, Huamark Center, The Mall Bangkapi and Paseo Town Ramkhamheang) and 4 night/community markets (Ramkhamhaeng Night Market, Tawanna Community Market, Mahadthai Night Market and Bangkapi Fresh Market).

The subdistrict's vibrant night markets, such as the Ramkhamhaeng Night Market, draw crowds for affordable goods, street food, and entertainment, supporting small vendors and service providers. Proximity to Suvarnabhumi International Airport, approximately 20 kilometers away and connected via the Airport Rail Link's Bang Kapi station, bolsters logistics and transportation services, enabling efficient distribution for businesses in the region.

Key businesses in Bang Kapi include small-scale manufacturing, often linked to nearby industrial zones in Lat Krabang, where components are processed for local and export markets. Tourism-related services flourish around Rajamangala National Stadium, which hosts major sporting events, concerts, and cultural gatherings, generating demand for hospitality, catering, and event support operations.

The informal economy plays a vital role, particularly through street vending and gig work concentrated around Ramkhamhaeng University, where food stalls, transport services, and temporary labor opportunities sustain daily livelihoods for many residents. This sector complements formal employment, especially amid Thailand's broader service-oriented job market, where services account for nearly 48% of national employment. Local economic contributions, including to Bang Kapi District, are supported by these activities, district-specific unemployment rates align with Bangkok's low overall figures of around 1% in recent years.

Bang Kapi has recently been going through a renaissance in its retail scene with 3 recent major mall renovation in its area such as The Mall Lifestore Bangkapi (2022 - 20 billion THB), Huamark Center (2023 - 300 million THB) and The Mall Ramkhamhaeng (2026 - 1.3 billion THB).

==== Huamark Center ====
In 2023, developments including the revamped Huamark Center—a lifestyle mall with over 250 brands in fashion, food, and electronics—have enhanced its appeal as a destination for families, students, and office workers, with daily footfall estimated at 20,000 to 30,000.

==== The Mall Ramkhamhaeng ====
In 2026, the 1981 Soul & Sold Shopping Complex was inaugurated. The "1981 Soul & Sold" project features a new cultural retail hub concept integrating culture, experience, storytelling and identity alongside traditional shopping. The project features zones designed to connect fashion, culture and community: fashion; music-media; vintage tech nostalgia; art, crafts and design; collectibles and memorabilia; lifestyle services; and food and beverage.

==== The Mall Lifestore Bangkapi ====
The Mall Lifestore Bangkapi is a vibrant shopping complex in Bangkok, Thailand, known for its diverse range of retail stores, dining options, and entertainment facilities. Spanning multiple levels, it features brands that cater to various tastes and lifestyles, making it a popular destination for both locals and tourists. The mall includes supermarkets, fashion outlets, and leisure facilities such as a cinema and family entertainment area. Its modern design and convenient location make it an ideal place for shopping trips, dining experiences, and social gatherings.

The Mall Bangkapi targets middle-income families in a 10 km catchment of over 2 million residents (median income 35,000 THB/month, age 38). Occupancy at 92-95%, footfall 15,000-20,000 daily weekdays rising to 30,000 weekends, annual 15 million visitors. Rents 800–1,200 THB/sqm/month (average 1,000), with 3-5 year terms and turnover options. Holds stable position in saturated eastern Bangkok retail and strong for essentials via local traffic.

==== Paseo Town Ramkhamhaeng ====
The Paseo Town Ramkhamhaeng is an open-air lifestyle community mall located at 7/2-7 Ramkhamhaeng Road, Saphan Sung, Bangkok, open daily from 10:00 AM to 9:00 PM. It features a calm, airy, Japanese-inspired design with a water fountain, canal-side walking areas, and ample parking. It is positioned as a quiet, neighborhood-focused and upper-middle class mall alternative to crowded mega-malls, popular for casual evening strolls and family dining. Popular F&B Chains (Wine Connection, Korean BBQ, Fast Food) and Retail Outlets (Watsons, Daiso, Villa Market) can be found at Paseo Mall Ramkhamhaeng.

== Night Markets and Local Hypermarkets ==
=== Night Markets ===
Bang Kapi's markets and shopping scene blends traditional street vending with modern retail, catering primarily to local residents, students from nearby Ramkhamhaeng University, and budget-conscious shoppers. The area along Ramkhamhaeng Road serves as a commercial hub, where affordable goods and diverse food options draw crowds in the evenings and weekends. These venues play a key role in the local economy by supporting small vendors and providing accessible daily necessities.

Complementing the Ramkhamhaeng Night Market, weekend options in Bang Kapi include walking streets and smaller markets focused on fresh produce, handicrafts, and local eats. For instance, the halal weekend walking street near Bang Kapi Stadium provides a casual atmosphere for browsing fruits, vegetables, handmade items, and street cuisine, appealing to families and nearby communities on Saturdays and Sundays.

=== Ramkhamhaeng Night Market ===
The Ramkhamhaeng Night Market operates daily from around 3:30 PM to 10:30 PM. Specializing in street food such as Thai desserts, halal dishes, and fusion snacks, it also features stalls selling clothing, electronic gadgets, footwear, and accessories at low prices. This market offers an authentic local experience, emphasizing women's fashion and everyday bargains in a spacious, less touristy setting.

Notably, the presence of numerous halal food stalls makes it an ideal spot for Muslim tourists seeking to experience authentic Thai street food without compromising their dietary needs.

=== Tawanna Community Market ===
Tawanna Bangkapi Community Market is a blend of a community mall and lifestyle market and targeted to meet the needs of residents in Bangkapi District. With a welcoming atmosphere, the market features an integrated range of products and services at affordable prices, entertainment options as well as a variety of restaurants and street food.

Tawanna Bangkapi Community Market is an integrated center for visitors to shop, eat, drink, and hangout. The community market features outdoor and indoor airconditioned zones offering tasty snacks and meals at affordable prices. Visitors can enjoy casual eateries, award-winning restaurants, a food court, street food, and cafes, while shopaholics can get the latest fashions, jewelry, IT products and accessories. It is open from 10am to 10pm everyday.

Services range from beauty clinics, nail salons, smartphone sales and repair shops. The World Siam Stadium was recently opened in 2020 and features a boxing ring with cutting-edge light and sound system. It is one of the newest Muay Thai stadiums in Bangkok. The World Siam Stadium regularly holds Muay Thai and Boxing events multiple times weekly.

=== Hypermarkets ===
Modern retail outlets offer a contrast to the open-air markets, with the Makro Hypermart at Ramkhamhaeng 24 and Big C Supercenter at 177 Ramkhamhaeng Road and providing comprehensive groceries, household items, and imported products in an air-conditioned environment. Open daily from 6:00am to 11:00pm for Makro Hypermart and 8:00 AM to 9:00 PM for Big C Supercenter, it serves as a one-stop shop for residents seeking convenience. Along Ramkhamhaeng Road, The Mall Bangkapi (now The Mall Lifestore Bangkapi) features department stores, fashion outlets, and entertainment options, attracting shoppers for branded goods and dining.Trading in these areas emphasizes affordability, with peak footfall tied to the university calendar as students boost demand for budget-friendly apparel and snacks.

== Education ==
=== Higher Education Institutions ===
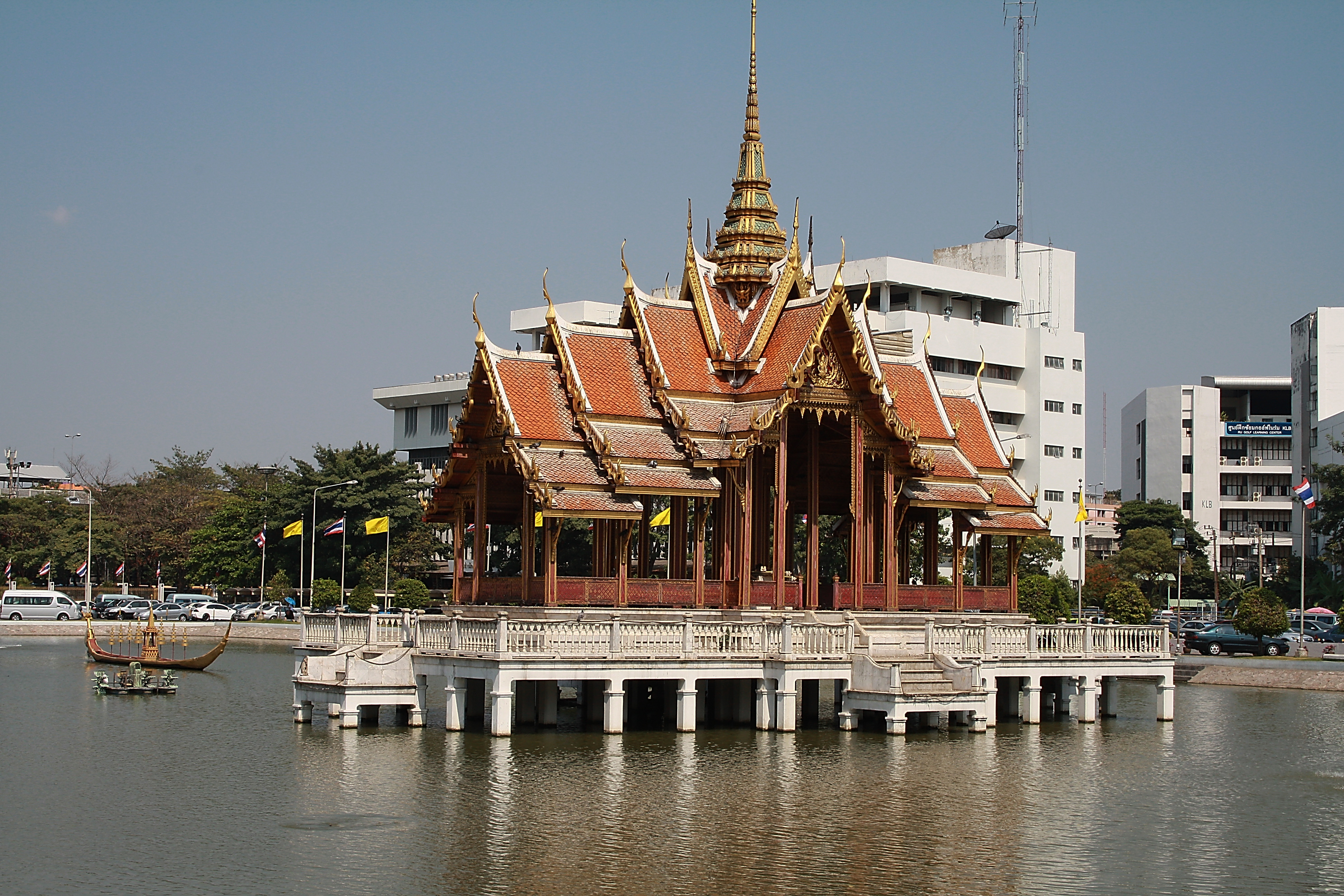
Ramkhamhaeng University

Ramkhamhaeng University - Faculty of Law

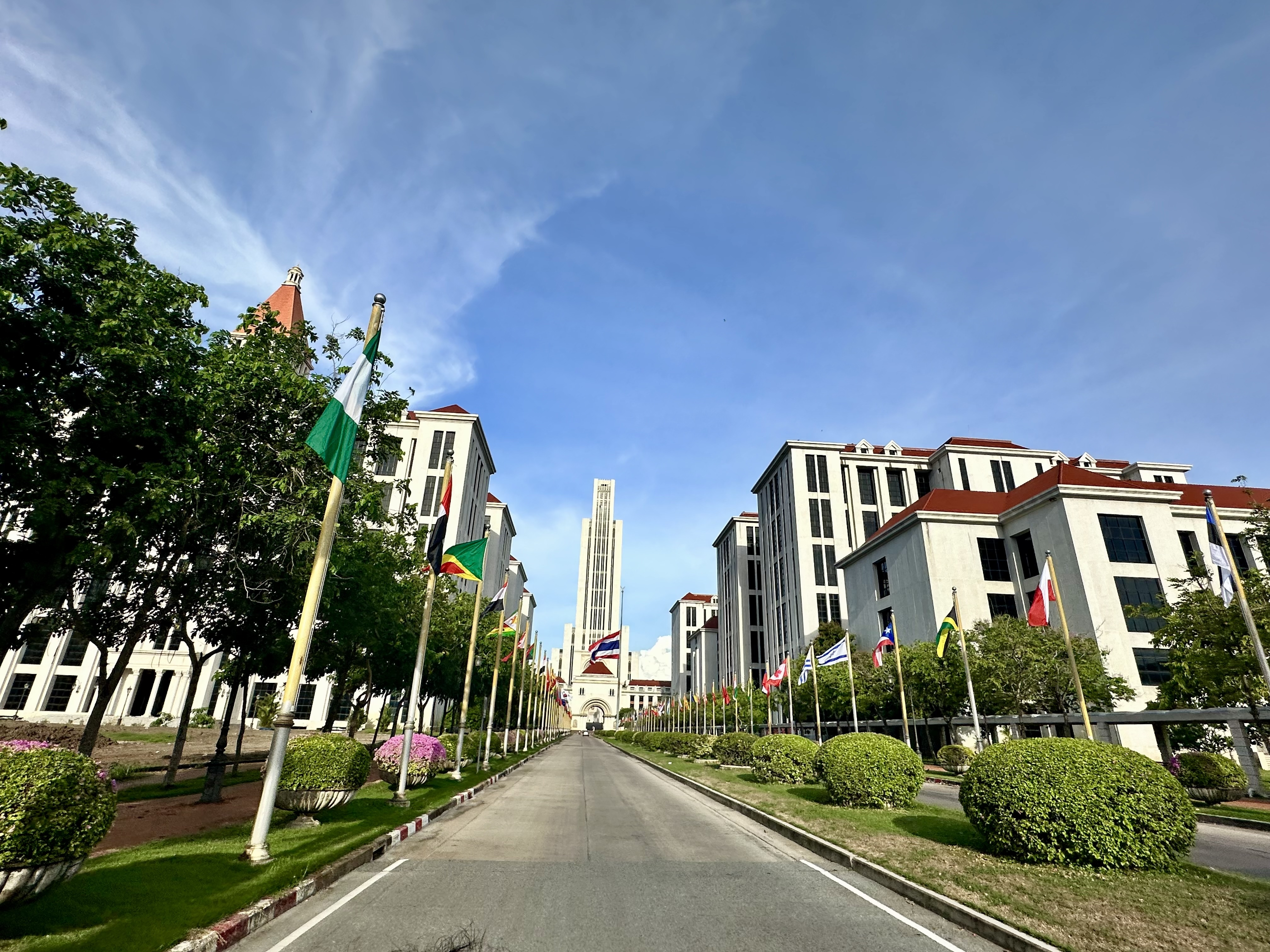
Assumption University

Bang Kapi serves as a significant hub for higher education in Bangkok, primarily anchored by two prominent universities: Ramkhamhaeng University and Assumption University, both of which maintain major campuses in the area. These institutions contribute to the subdistrict's academic landscape by offering diverse programs in open admissions, business, science, engineering, humanities and international studies, attracting a large student population that supports local economic vitality.

==== Ramkhamhaeng University ====
Ramkhamhaeng University, established in 1971 as Thailand's first open-admissions institution, is located on its main campus spanning approximately 300 rai along Ramkhamhaeng Road in Bang Kapi, Bang Kapi District. Designed to provide accessible higher education to working adults and secondary school graduates without entrance exams, it has grown into the country's largest open university, with active enrollment reaching 296,347 students as of second semester of 2023, including both Thai and international students from 49 countries.

The university comprises 13 faculties offering undergraduate and graduate programs in fields such as law, business administration, humanities, sciences, education, political science, and engineering, emphasizing distance learning and flexible scheduling to accommodate non-traditional learners. Enrollment peaked during the 2010s, driven by affordable tuition and expanded online options, though numbers have since stabilized amid broader shifts in Thai higher education access. Campus facilities include extensive libraries, research centers focused on social sciences and technology, and innovation hubs that foster community partnerships for local development projects.

==== Assumption University ====
Assumption University, founded in 1969 as an extension of the Assumption Commercial College, operates its original Bang Kapi campus at 592/3 Soi Ramkhamhaeng 24, serving as a key site for its international-oriented programs. As a private Catholic institution, it enrolls approximately 20,000 students across its campuses as of recent estimates, with the Bang Kapi site hosting undergraduate and graduate offerings in business, engineering, arts, communication, and biotechnology through 11 schools. The university's emphasis on English-medium instruction and global partnerships positions it as a leader in multicultural higher education, drawing students from more than 100 nationalities. Alumni of Assumption University includes Queen Suthida, H.E. Miss Sabida Thaiseth (Minister of Culture), and various MNC Senior Executives. Facilities at the Bang Kapi campus feature modern libraries, research centers in digital innovation and sustainable business, and collaborative spaces that support interdisciplinary projects, enhancing Bang Kapi's role as an education and innovation node.

==== Stamford International University (Thailand) ====
Stamford International University (Thailand) is a private university offering a range of academic programs, offering Bachelor's, Master's and PHD programs. It caters to both domestic and international students, with campuses in Bangkok and Hua Hin. Stamford International University was founded in 1995 and serves over 4000 students from 100 countries. It has been ranked as #40 in Thailand's best university list according to Edurank.

Beyond these flagship universities, Bang Kapi hosts extension programs and smaller specialized institutions, including vocational colleges like Wandee Culinary Technological College, which offers certificate and diploma programs in hospitality and culinary arts approved by the Ministry of Education. These entities provide targeted training in practical fields, complementing the broader academic ecosystem without overlapping into primary or secondary levels.

=== Primary and Secondary Education ===
Local Curriculum

Primary and secondary education in Bang Kapi is characterized by a mix of public institutions managed by the Bangkok Metropolitan Administration and private international schools catering to diverse student needs. The public education system includes several institutions overseen by the Bangkok Education Office, providing compulsory education from primary through secondary levels and emphasizing Thai national curriculum standards that include language, mathematics, science, and social studies. A prominent example is Bangkapi School, now offering comprehensive K-12 programs to local residents.

Bang Kapi benefits from Thailand's national policy of free compulsory education up to lower secondary level (ages 6–15), contributing to a high literacy rate of 98% among residents aged 15 and above. This policy, enforced since 2002, ensures broad access and has significantly boosted educational attainment in urban areas like Bang Kapi. Recent expansions, including new classroom constructions funded by the Bangkok Metropolitan Administration, have aimed to alleviate these issues by increasing capacity.

International Private Curriculum (British Mandrain International School and Traill International School)

Private education options in and around Bang Kapi include several international schools offering bilingual and English-medium programs, attracting expatriate families and affluent locals. Institutions such as the British Mandarin International School, located directly in Bang Kapi, integrate British curriculum elements with Mandarin language instruction for early years through secondary levels, serving students with class sizes typically around 12 pupils. Similarly, Traill International School in Bang Kapi provides a British-based curriculum from kindergarten to secondary education, focusing on holistic development through sports and arts.

Brighton College Bangkok

Brighton College Bangkok was recently inaugurated in 2024. Located in East Bang Kapi, the academically selective school provides education from age 2 to 18 from 50 different countries and covers the British IGCSE and A Levels curriculum. The newly constructed school has state of the art educational and sports facilities, and was awarded the 'British International School of the Year’ at the prestigious Independent School of the Year Awards 2024. Brighton College UK, hailed by The Sunday Times as “School of the Decade,” has built a reputation as the nation's foremost co-educational independent school. In 2024, it distinguished itself by achieving the 2nd highest examination results of any independent school across the country.

Wellington College International Bangkok

Wellington College International Bangkok opened in 2018 as the Bangkok outpost of Wellington College UK, one of England's most prestigious boarding schools, founded in 1859. Around 1,100 students attend from Pre-Nursery through Year 13, on a 70-rai (28-acre) green campus in Krungthep Kreetha, Saphan Sung, eastern Bangkok. The British National Curriculum runs through to Cambridge IGCSE and A-Levels, with admissions that are academically selective at all entry points.

The campus is purpose-built and expansive: a 600-seat theatre, Olympic-length pool, golf practice facilities, and generous outdoor space that few urban campuses in Bangkok can match. The school is owned jointly by Wellington College UK and Thai investors, with the founding head Chris Nicholls in place since opening. The community is international and mixed, skewing toward academically motivated families across nationalities. The Krungthep Kreetha location sits midway between central Bangkok and Suvarnabhumi Airport, off the BTS and MRT network. Families drive or use the school bus service, which runs across Bangkok.

Ramkhamhaeng Advent International School (RAIS)

The Ramkhamhaeng Advent International School (RAIS) provides American structured curriculum and has approximately 700 enrolled students from Pre-school to High School levels.

== Sports and Concerts ==
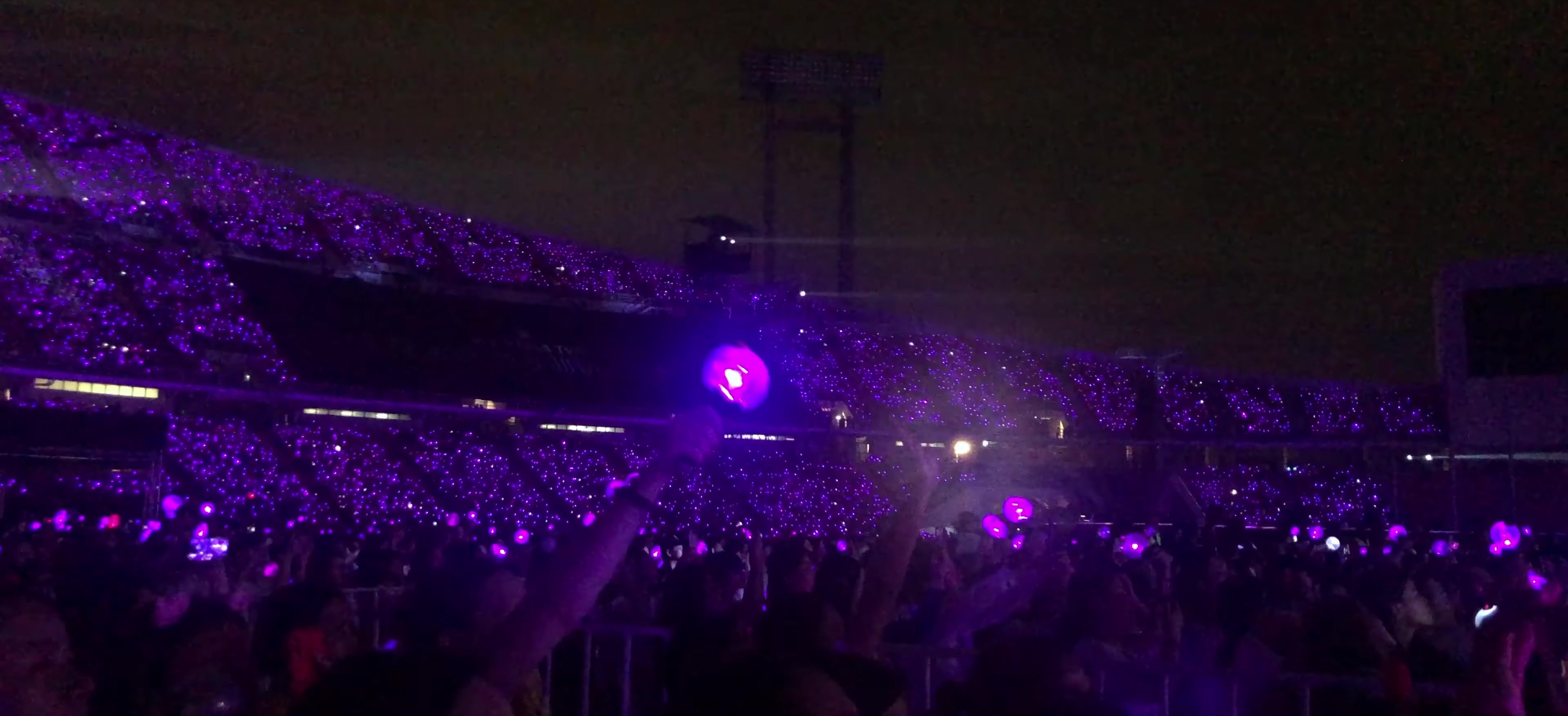
BTS Tour in Rajamangala Stadium - April 2019

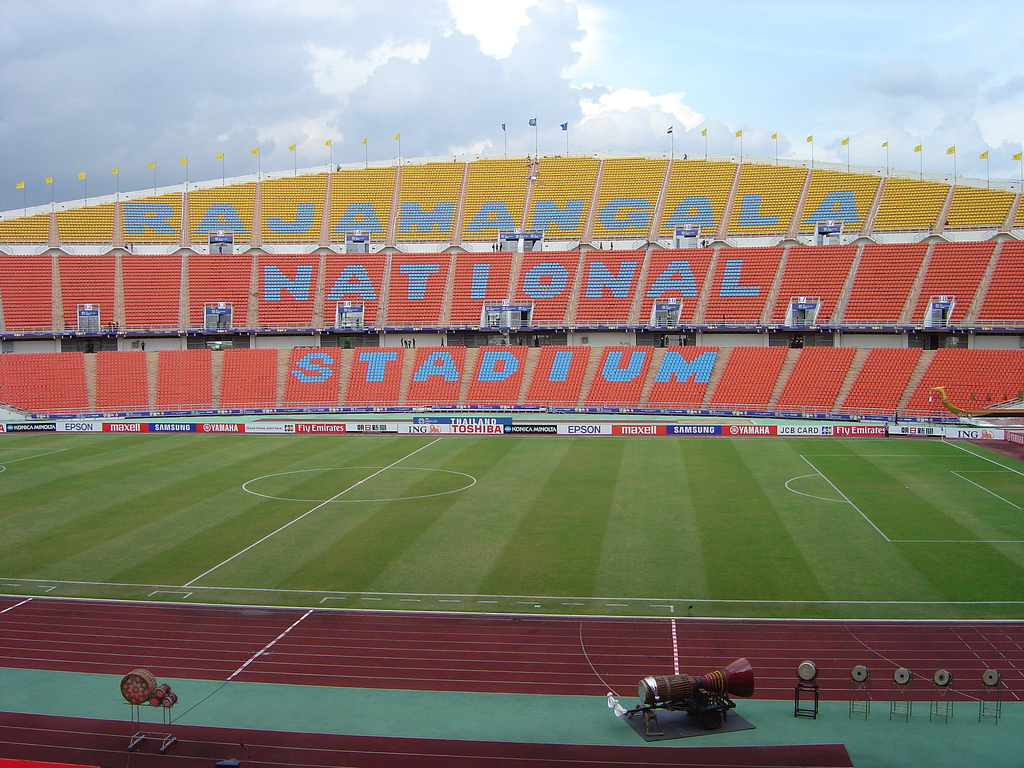
51,560 Seats in Rajamangala Stadium

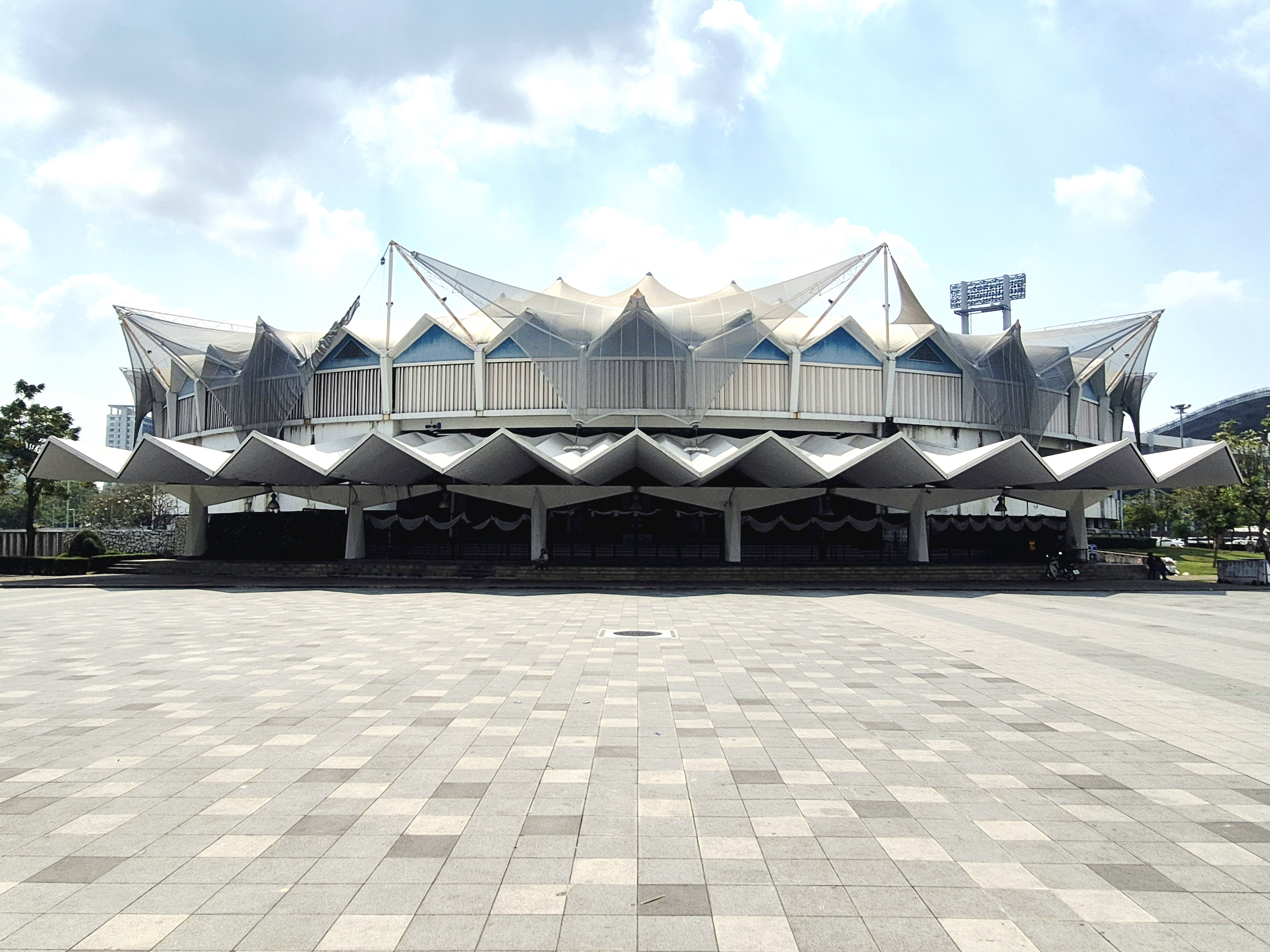
Bang Kapi Indoor Stadium

=== Sports, Recreation & Entertainment ===
Bang Kapi serves as a hub for sports and recreation in Bangkok, primarily anchored by the expansive Bang Kapi Sports Complex managed by the Sports Authority of Thailand. Rajamangala National Stadium is part of the wider Bang Kapi Sporting Complex. The Bang Kapi Sporting Complex contains 4 Stadiums, 3 Gyms, 1 Olympic-sized Pools, 1 Skate Park, 1 Shooting Range, 6 Tennis Courts and 1 Climbing Range. The Bang Kapi Sporting Complex caters to more than 20 sports.

Stadiums:

- Rajamangala National Stadium
- Bang Kapi Indoor Stadium
- Bang Kapi Bicycle Velodrome Stadium
- SAT Football Stadium
- Bang Kapi Skatepark

Swimming Complex:

- Huamark Aquatic Center

Gyms and Personal Fitness Centers:

- Sports Training Center
- Sports Science Center
- Fitness, Sports Authority of Thailand

Shooting Range:

- Shooting Sports Authority of Thailand

Sports Equipment:

- FBT Sports Complex

Climbing Center:

- Bangkok Sport Climbing Center

The Bang Kapi Sports Complex also plays host to the Sports Authority of Thailand governing body and 28 of 37 sports associations of Thailand. The sports associations are under the National Olympic Committee of Thailand and under the Thai Royal Patronage.

Sports Authority, Associations & Libraries:

- Sports Authority of Thailand
  - Fitness, Sports Authority of Thailand
  - Sports Engineering Department, Sports Authority of Thailand
  - Public Sports Library, Sports Authority of Thailand
- Team Sports
  - Football Association of Thailand
  - Softball Association of Thailand
  - Basketball Association of Thailand
  - Thai Rugby Union Under the Royal Patronage of His Majesty the King
  - Thailand Rowing and Canoeing Association
  - Thailand Volleyball Association
  - Thailand Hockey Association
  - Ice Hockey Association of Thailand
  - Handball Association of Thailand
  - Thailand Swimming Association
- Combat Sports
  - Taekwondo Association of Thailand
  - Judo Association of Thailand
  - Thai Wrestling Association
  - Thai Amateur Weightlifting Association
  - The Thailand Fencing Federation Under the Royal Patronage of his Royal Highness the Crown Prince
- Shooting Sports
  - National Archery Association of Thailand
  - Shooting Sports Association of Thailand
  - Skeet and Trap Shooting Association of Thailand
- Acrobatic Arts
  - Gymnastics Association of Thailand
  - Figure & Speed Skating Association of Thailand
- Ball Games
  - Professional Golf Association of Thailand
  - Thai Tenpin Bowling Association
  - The Petanque Association of Thailand
- Card Games
  - Contract Bridge League of Thailand
- Others
  - National Jogging Association of Thailand
  - Thai Cycling Association
  - Thailand Sport Climbing Association of Thailand
  - Thailand Extreme Sports Association
  - Sports Association for the Intellectual Disability of Thailand

The centerpiece is the Rajamangala National Stadium, constructed in 1998 with a capacity of 51,560 spectators, designed to host major athletic events and foster community engagement in physical activities. Located in the Bang Kapi district, the stadium features a natural grass pitch measuring 105 by 68 meters and regularly accommodates Thailand's national football team matches, international competitions, and large-scale concerts that draw diverse crowds for entertainment and fitness promotion.

Blackpink Concert at Rajamangala Stadium

Past international competitions held at Rajamangala National Stadium includes the 2007 AFC Asian Cup, 2023 AFC U-17 Asian Cup, 2024 ASEAN Championship and 2025 SEA Games. Rajamangala National Stadium has also hosted large-scale concerts such as Coldplay, BTS, Blackpink, Ed Sheeren, Lady Gaga, Bruno Mars, Jay Chou and others.

The stadium has played a pivotal role in regional sports history, serving as the main venue for the opening ceremony and multiple events during the 1998 Asian Games, where it welcomed athletes from across Asia for competitions in football and other disciplines. It also hosted key matches, including the opening and closing ceremonies, for the 2007 AFC Asian Cup, 2024 ASEAN Championship and 2025 SEA Games, contributing to Thailand's sporting legacy by providing world-class facilities that enhance local pride and participation in team sports. Beyond elite events, the complex supports recreational leagues and community gatherings, with surrounding paths around the stadium popular for jogging and casual exercise among residents.

In 2024, the Sports Authority of Thailand (SAT) announced a THB 5-billion (US$150 million) makeover budget for the Rajamangala National Stadium. Improvements include upgrading the security system, smart facilities and sound system within the arena. The makeover was completed before the opening ceremony of the 2025 SEA Games and transformed Rajamangala National Stadium into a Smart Stadium with upgraded sound system to deliver sound to every seat. This is in line with the vision of transforming Rajamangala National Stadium into a world-class sports and concert venue.

Local parks and open spaces within the sports complex provide venues for community sports like basketball and volleyball, while the nearby Huamark Skatepark enables skateboarding and youth-oriented activities, promoting active lifestyles and social interaction in the area.

Complementing the sports complex, other facilities in Bang Kapi cater to varied recreational interests. The Krungthep Kreetha Golf Course, established in 1969 and situated along Krungthep Kreetha Road in the subdistrict, offers an 18-hole championship layout that attracts golfers seeking leisure amid urban greenery. The Krungthep Kreetha Golf Course has been noted for its close proximity to Bangkok Center, its strong value proposition and its lush royal garden layout. It is one of the most popular and best known golf courses in Bangkok.

Directly opposite the Krungthep Kreetha Golf Course is another 18-hole golf course, the Unico Grande Golf Course. The course offers a smooth, beginner-friendly layout that accommodates golfers of all abilities. Each hole is thoughtfully designed with manageable distances, ensuring a round that is both relaxing and engaging. Complementing the experience, the clubhouse and practice areas are fully equipped to provide comfort and convenience.

== Geography ==
Bang Kapi is the southern part of Bang Kapi District. Adjacent subdistricts are (from the north clockwise): Phlapphla in Wang Thonglang District, Khlong Chan in its district, Khlong Kum in Bueng Kum District (Khlong Saen Saep is a boundary line), Saphan Sung and Thap Chang in Saphan Sung District (Khlong Ban Ma 2, Khlong Wang Bon Yai, Khlong Kho Lat, Khlong Bueng Ban Ma are the boundary lines), Phatthanakan and Suan Luang in Suan Luang District (Demarcation Ditch, Khlong Bang Kapi, Khlong Kacha are the boundary lines), and Bang Kapi in Huai Khwang District (Khlong Saen Saep is a boundary line).

== Places ==
=== Education ===
- Universities:
  - Ramkhamhaeng University (RU) - the largest university in Thailand with over 500,000 students. The main campus spans approximately 300 rai (about 120 acres) along Ramkhamhaeng Road and offers different undergraduate and postgraduate programs such as law, business, engineering, science and humanities.
  - Assumption University of Thailand (ABAC)
  - Stamford International University
- International Schools:
  - Brighton College Bangkok
  - International Hotel and Tourism Industry Management School
  - Traill International School (British)
  - British Mandarin International School
  - Ramkhamhaeng Advent International School (RAIS) (American Curriculum)
  - Wellington College International School Bangkok
  - Bernie International Prep School

=== Transportation ===
- Ramkhamhaeng station - Airport Rail Link Station
- SAT Station - Orange Line (Bangkok) (Opening in 2028)
- Yaek Lam Sali Station - Yellow, Orange and Brown Lines
- Khlong Saen Saeb - Many piers for express boat service, including The Mall Ramkhamhaeng Pier, Ramkhamhaeng University (RU) Pier, Saphat Mit Mahat Thai Pier. Connects to key destinations such as The Mall Bangkapi, Ramkhamhaeng Airport Rail Link (ARL) Station, Khlong Tan ARL Station, Asoke ARL Station, Phetchaburi MRT Station, Chit Lom, Nana and Centralw0rld Shopping Mall

=== Sports ===
- Rajamangala National Stadium - Opening and Closing Venue for 2025 SEA Games. Also hosted international concerts such as Coldplay, Blackpink, BTS, Lady Gaga, One Direction, Ed Sheeran, Justin Bieber, Jay Chou, Maroon 5, Harry Styles, Bruno Mars, The Weeknd, Post Malone, Seventeen, Got7
- Indoor Stadium Huamark
- Huamark Bicycle Velodrone
- SAT Football Stadium
- SAT Swimming Pool
- Sports Training Center
- Shooting Sports Authority of Thailand
- FBT Sports Complex
- Krungthep Kreetha Golf Course - 18 Holes Full Golf Course
- Unico Grande Golf Course - 18 Holes Full Golf Course

=== Parks ===
- Ramkhamhaeng Health Garden & Lake

=== Shopping ===
- 1981 Soul & Sold The Mall Ramkhamhaeng
- Huamark Shopping Center
- The Mall Bangkapi
- Paseo Town Ramkhamhaeng

=== Markets ===
- Ramkhamhaeng Night Market
- Tawanna Community Market
- Mahadthai Night Market
- Bangkapi Fresh Market
- Wat Saphan Floating Market

== Education ==
- Ramkhamhaeng University
- Assumption University of Thailand
- Stamford International University

== Administration ==
The district is divided into two sub-districts (khwaeng).

No.	Name	Thai	Area (km^{2})	Map
1.	Khlong Chan	คลองจั่น	12.062	Map
8.	Bang Kapi	หัวหมาก	16.461	Map
Total			28.523	Map

The missing numbers 2, 3, 4, 5, 6 and 7 belong to the sub-districts which were split off to form Wang Thonglang, Lat Phrao and Bueng Kum districts.

== Religion ==
Ramkhamhaeng has a rich diversity of different religious monuments. The area is especially noted for its ornate Thai Temple complex, European cathedrals and waterside Mosques.

Temple:

- Wat Thep Leap Temple Complex - a historic royal Buddhist temple known for its unique ornate pagodas and prayer hall. Also hosts a weekend night market every week.

Church:

- Chapel of the Annunciation - Assumption University. Known for its many intricate stained glass windows and classical marble design. Open to public during operating hours.

Mosques:

- The Foundation of the Islamic Centre of Thailand Masjid. This Islamic Center of Thailand mosque features exquisite architectural elements, symbolizing Islamic tradition and belief.
- Masjid Jamiul Islam. Known for its picturesque view of the Khlong Saen Saep Canal.

== District council ==
The District council for Bang Kapi has eight members, who each serve four-year terms. Elections were last held on 30 April 2006. The results were as follows:

- Democrat Party – seven seats
- Thai Rak Thai Party – one seat

== Notable places etc. ==
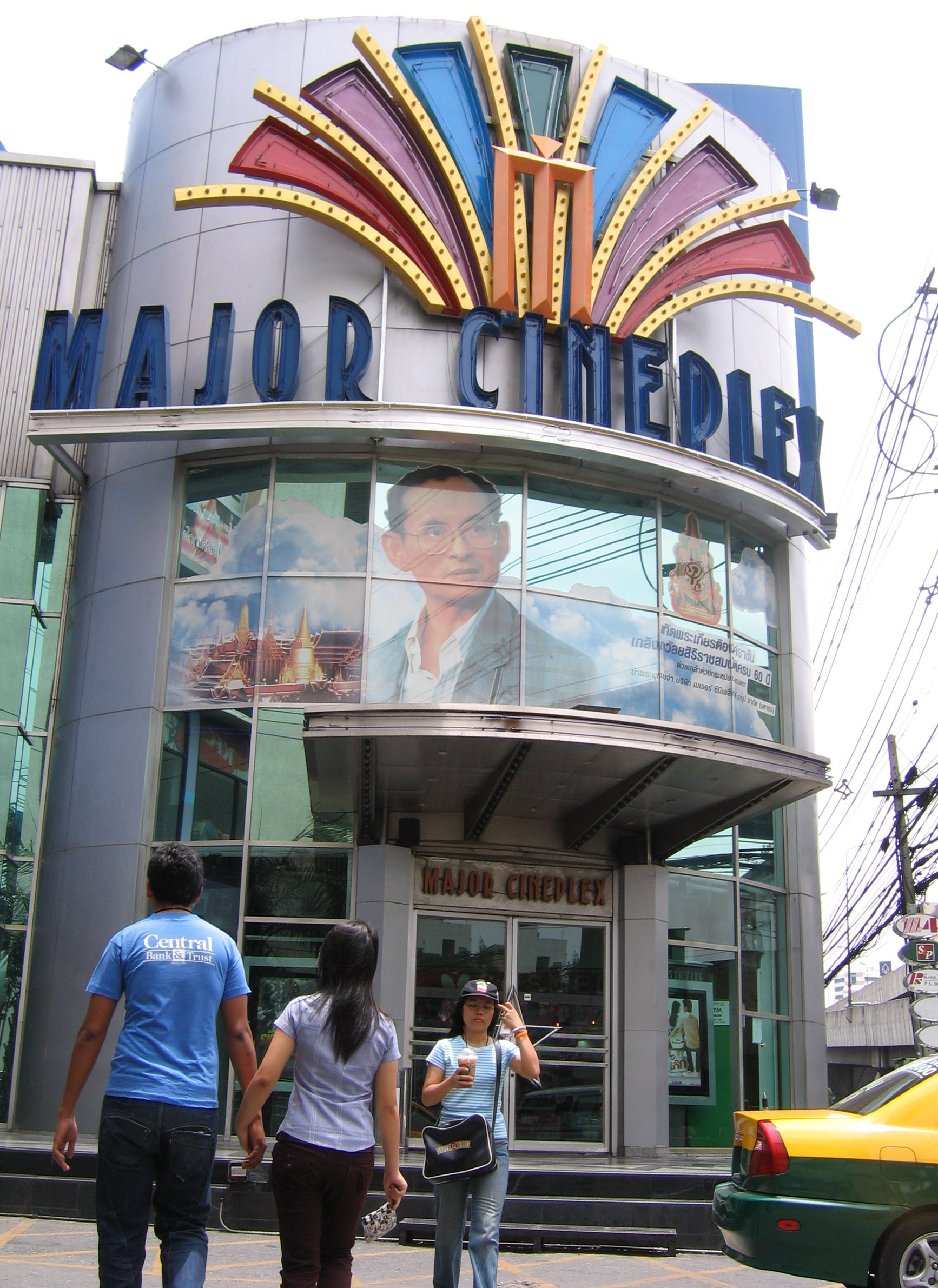
Major Cineplex Ramkhamhaeng

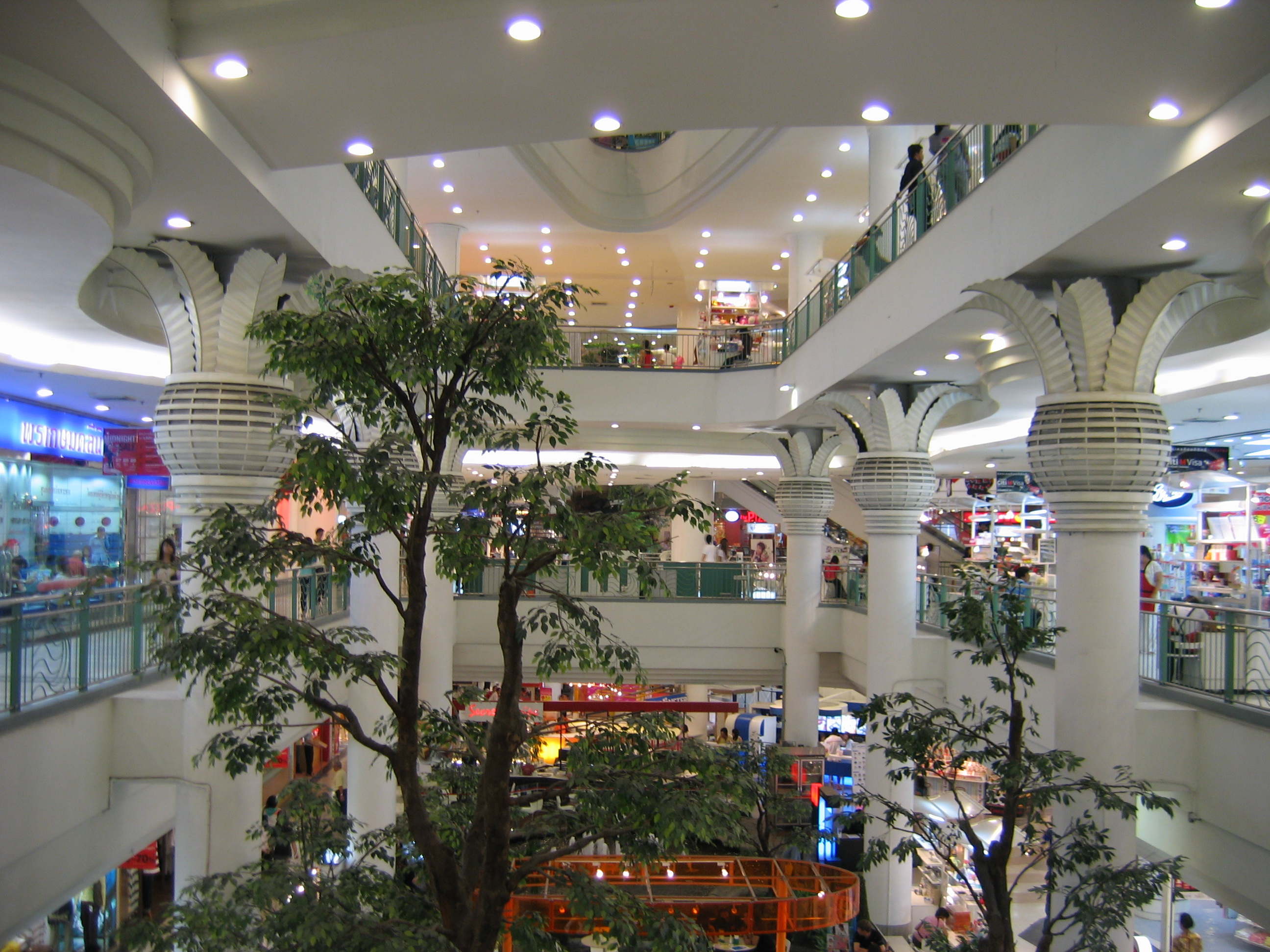
Inside the Mall Bangkapi

=== Temples ===
- Wat Bueng Thong Lang

=== Shopping ===
- The Mall Ramkhamhaeng
- The Mall Bang Kapi
- Big C Bang Kapi
- Tesco Lotus Bang Kapi
- Kwan Riam floating market

=== Transportation ===
- MRT Yellow Line passes through the district along the Lat Phrao and Srinagarindra roads. Stations are Lat Phrao 101, Bang Kapi, Yaek Lam Sali, Si Kritha.
- Khlong Saen Saeb - Many piers for express boat service, including The Mall Bang Kapi. The mall Bangkapi boat pier.
- Ramkhamhaeng airport rail link station, located at Suan Luang District
- Bang Kapi airport rail link station, located at Suan Luang District

=== Other ===
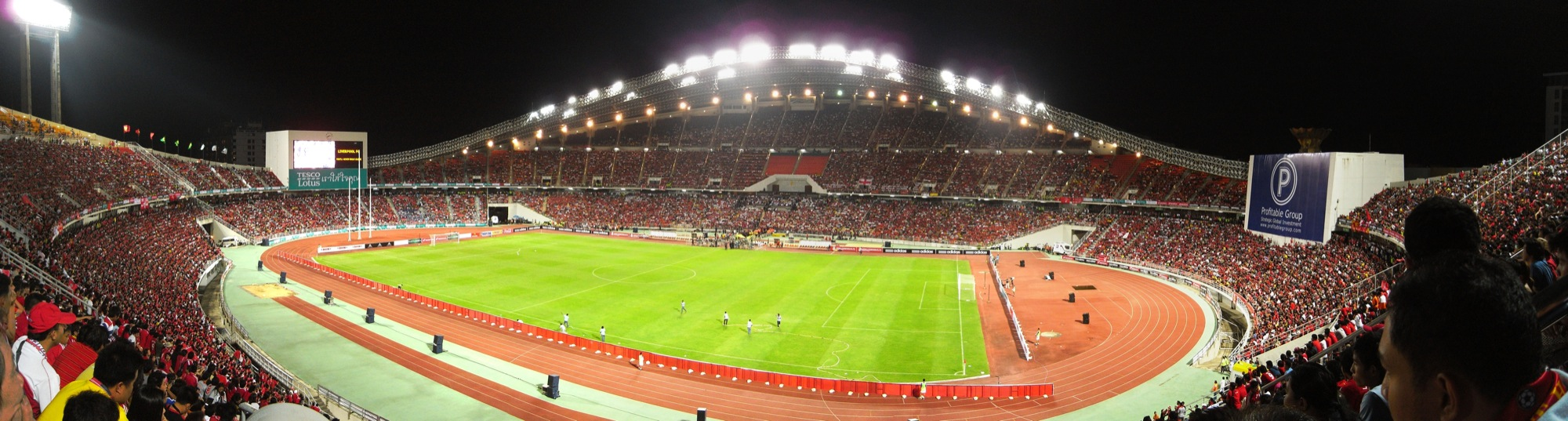
Rajamangala Stadium

- Bang Kapi Sports Complex (including Rajamangala Stadium)
- Prasart Museum

=== Sports ===
- Rajamangala National Stadium and Indoor Stadium Huamark
