= National Housing Authority (Albania) =

Government agency of Albania

- Enti Kombëtar i Banesave
- Official logo

Housing agency overview
- Formed: 1993
- Jurisdiction: Albania
- Headquarters: Tirana
- Housing agency executive: Rudina Kodra, Director General
- Website: ekb.gov.al

The National Housing Authority (EKB; Albanian: Enti Kombëtar i Banesave) is a government agency under the supervision of the Albanian Ministry of Infrastructure and Energy. Its scope of activity deals with financing and addressing the housing needs of the population.
