= National Archery Association of Thailand =

Governing body of archery in Thailand

- Sport: Archery
- Jurisdiction: National
- Abbreviation: NAAT
- Founded: 10 November 1970; 54 years ago
- Affiliation: WA
- Affiliation date: 1971
- Regional affiliation: WAA
- Headquarters: Bang Kapi, Bangkok
- President: Mr. Sanguan Kosavinta
- Secretary: Mr. Sanpong Bampaensanti

Official website
- www.thailandarchery.com
- (Thailand)

The National Archery Association of Thailand (NAAT, Thai: สมาคมกีฬายิงธนูเเห่งประเทศไทย) is the national governing body for Archery. It is accredited by the World Archery Federation (WA) which is the governing body for the sport of Archery in the world, and the National Olympic Committee of Thailand (NOCT). It founded on 10 November 1970.

The association is headquartered in Bang Kapi, Bangkok. The current head of the federation is Mr. Sanguan Kosavinta.

== Championships ==
National Archery Association of Thailand organises championships every year in each of the sporting disciplines.

Year	Dates	Venue
2016	24–25 September	Huamark Archery Field, Bangkok
