= Ranong (disambiguation) =

Ranong may refer to these places in Thailand:

- the town Ranong
- Ranong Province
- Mueang Ranong district
