= Takkola =

2nd–13th century political entities

- 111 CE – 13th century
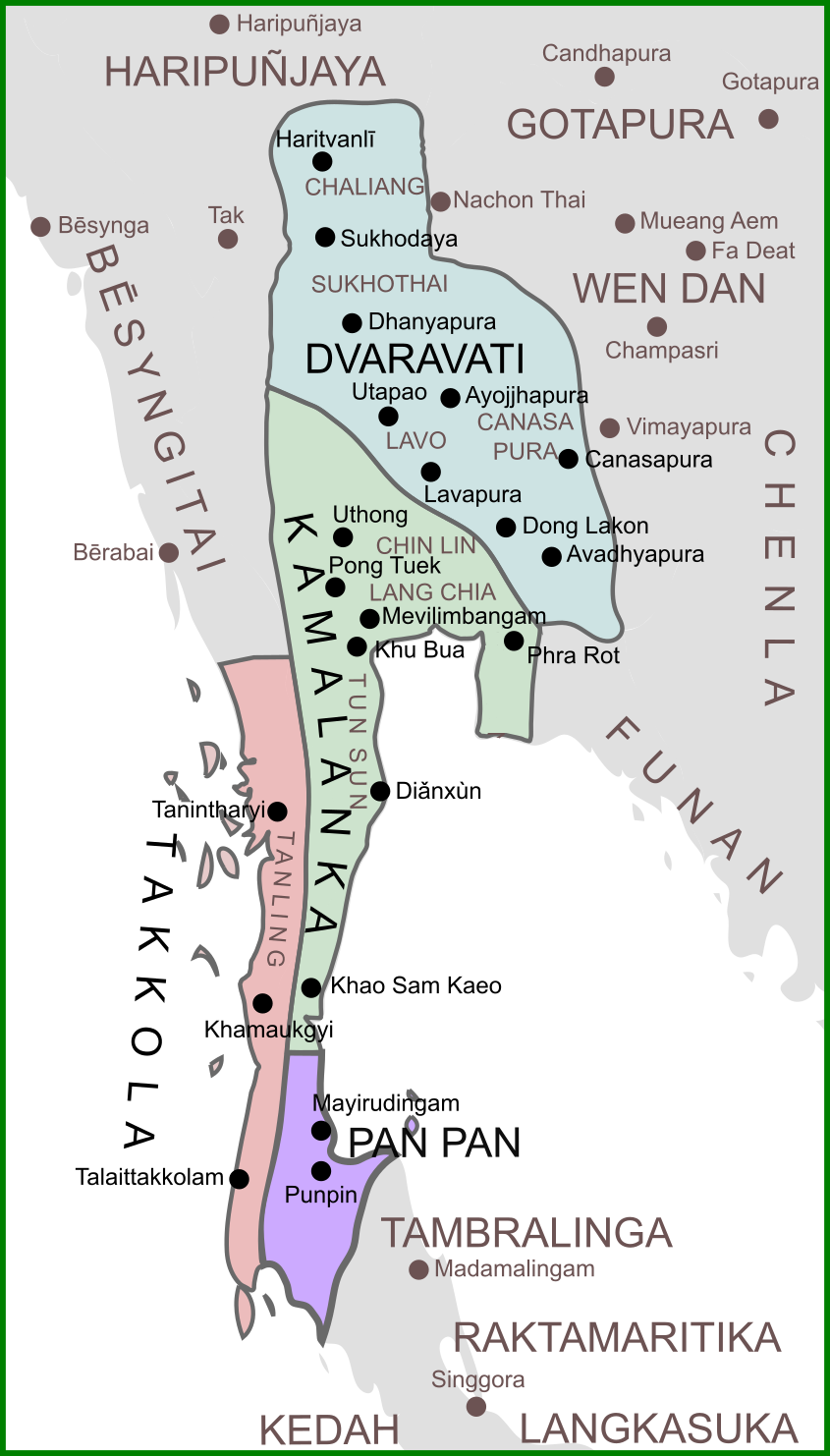
- Political entities in the Chao Phraya River Basin and the Kra Isthmus in the 6th–7th century
- Capital: Talaittakkolam
- Religion: Shaivism; Buddhism
- Historical era: Post-classical era
  - Established: 2nd century
  - First mentioned in Chinese source: 111
  - Part of Pagan/ Tambralinga: 11th century
  - Raided by Chola: 1030
  - Vassals of Pagan/ Sukhothai: 13th century
Preceded by	Succeeded by
Tun Sun	Tambralinga; Pagan
- Today part of: Thailand; Myanmar

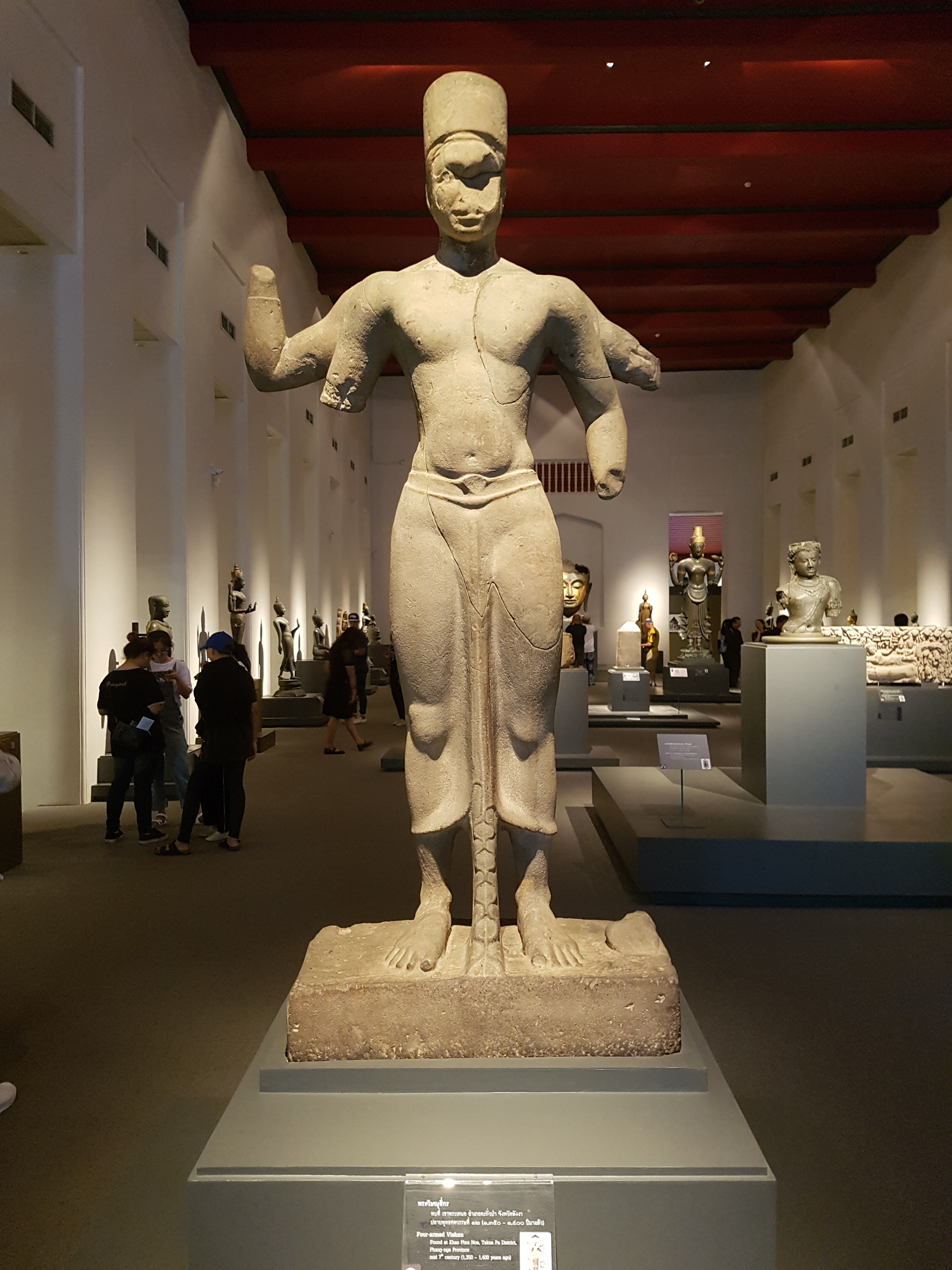
Statue of the Hindu god Viṣṇu, mid-7th century CE, found at the Phra Noe Hill (เขาพระเหน่อ), Takua Pa District, Phang Nga Province, displayed at the Bangkok National Museum.

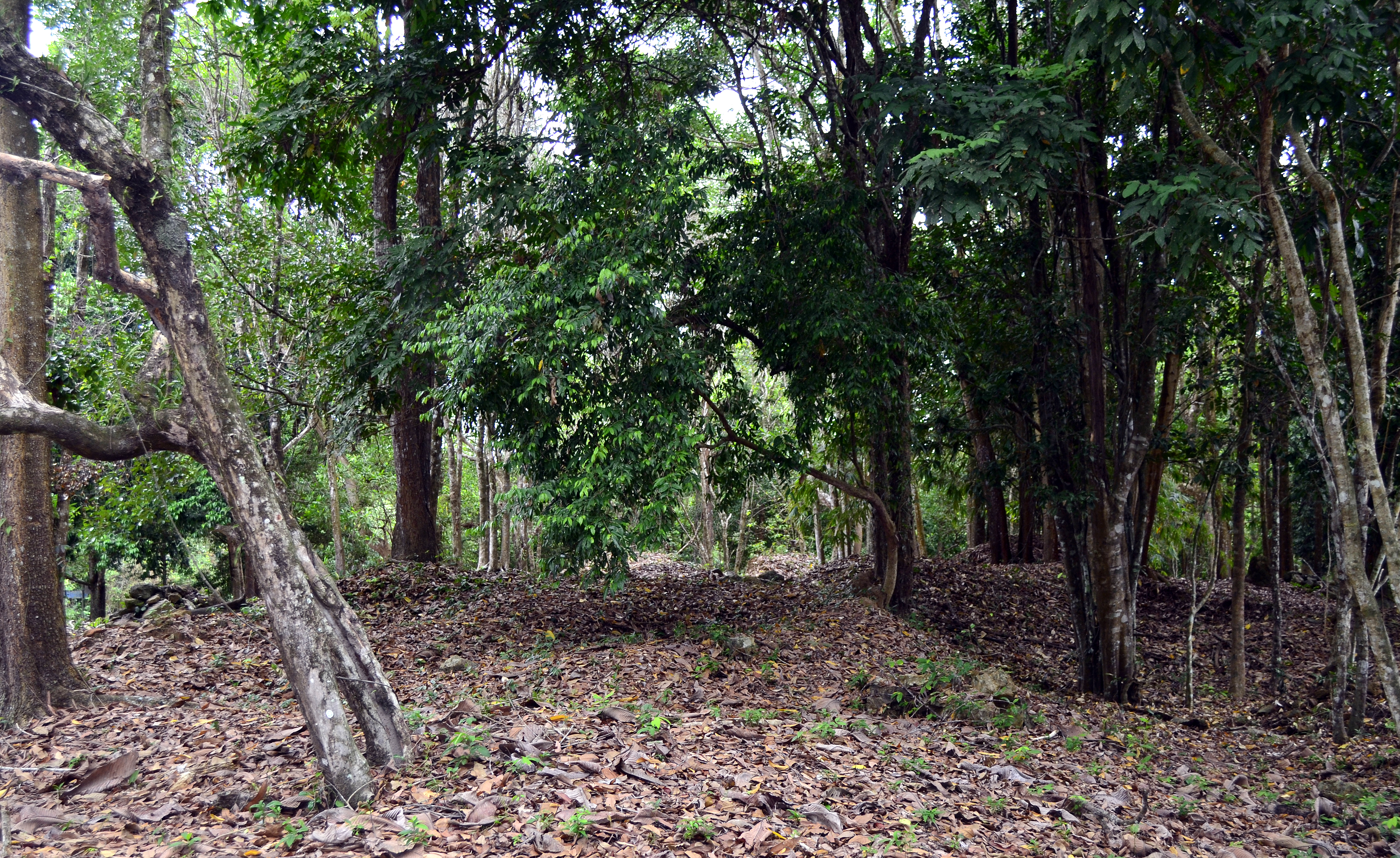
The historical site of Thung Tuk (ทุ่งตึก), proposed chief center of Takkola, on the Koh Kho Khao (เกาะคอเขา) in Takua Pa district, which has been significantly damaged due to unlawful excavation activities.

Takkola was an ancient emporium and political entity located in the present-day Tanintharyi Region of Myanmar and the western coast of southern Thailand, It existed from the 1st to 13th centuries CE, centered in the present Takua Pa district, and was said to control a vital branch of long-distance maritime trade between the India Ocean and the South China Sea. It was one of the earliest kingdoms in the peninsula Thailand; the others included Kamalanka and Tambralinga.

Takkola bagen declined around the 10th–11th centuries when the region was invaded by the Pagan Kingdom from the north and was constantly raided by the Chola during the South-East Asia campaign of Rajendra I from 1025 to 1068. Later, the region became part of the Thai kingdoms of Sukhothai and Ayutthaya, with some period returned to the Pagan.

Some Thai scholars proposed that the chief center of Takkola was probably situated around the Khao Phra Narai Historical Site (แหล่งโบราณคดีเขาพระนารายณ์) in the Kapong district as this location is more conducive to substantial habitation, whilst the sites at Takua Pa served as a maritime port and gold mines. The state may have been a vassal of the more dominant polity to the south, Tambralinga.

Takkola was anticipated to be the northernmost region of the mythical Suvarnabhumi, which extended from present-day Takua Pa in Thailand to Kedah in Malaysia. Some believe Gola-mattikanagaram, mentioned in the Kalyani Inscriptions of Pegu dated 1476, is Takkola. It was also proposed to be one of the five kingdoms in Tun Sun by Roland Braddell.

== History ==
=== Early period: before 11th century ===
Takōla first appeared in the Geōgraphikē Hyphēgēsis of Ptolemy around the 2nd century and was called Dōulú in Han Chinese in 111 CE, then it was recorded as Dōukūn in the post Han Chinese from the mid-3rd century onwards. It was also mentioned in the Buddhist texts, Mahāniddesa and Milinda Panha, in the 3rd–4th centuries. In this Greek record, Takōla is listed as the first polity in the Chrysē Chersonēsos, following “promontory beyond Bērabai (Dawei),” the final polity in the land of the Bēsyngitai. Thus, several scholars placed Takōla at the present-day Takua Pa, which was probably occupied by settlers from the Takkolam of the Tamil country, and the Dravidians from Kalinga. Other proposed locations are the present-day Trang province and the Suk Samran archaeological complex in Ranong province.

The area became the trading port between China and the western part, i.e., India, Persia, Europe, etc., in the last centuries BCE, following the political unifications of Mauryan India (321–265 BCE) and Han China (206 BCE–220 CE), which made it an avenue for economic and cultural integration, resulting in the development of political and socio-cultural configurations. However, these transpeninsular trade routes were used even before the Mauryan and Han unifications took place. Archaeological sites indicate that the communities developed to the Metal Age around the 5th century BCE, and developed the exchange-based, complex polities at the end of the first millennium BCE, some consisted of the cosmopolitan port. However, due to its submergence coast that limits the coastal plains to a thin strip of earth, it was very sparsely populated, and the trade was not as prosperous as other polities on the eastern coast, which are more conducive to large-scale settlements.

In the coastline of the Suk Samran district of Ranong down south to the Takua Pa district of Phang Nga, several historical sites of the early history era dating the 1st century CE were discovered. The primary sites included the earliest complex of Bang Kluai Nok in the same-named village and Phu Khao Thong, dating the 3rd–1st centuries BCE, where Southeast Asia's earliest Tamil inscription was found. and the twin sites of Ban Thung Tuek Ancient City (เมืองโบราณบ้านทุ่งตึก), situated on the Takua Pa Archipelago, and the Khao Phra Noe Historical site (แหล่งโบราณคดีเขาพระเหนอ), located on the riverside opposite the Thung Tuek site. The later complex was on the ancient trade route between Takua Pa on the west coast and the Bandon Bay sites of the Pan Pan Kingdom to the east coast. The route gained prominence during the Srivijaya period between the 7th and the 12th centuries.

According to the Chinese and Arab records, Takkola or Takōla territory once extended along the Andaman Sea coast from the northernmost island of Mali (မလိကျွန်း; Mali Kyun) in the Mergui Archipelago in Myanmar to Cape Promthep on Phuket in Thailand.

=== Decline: 11th–13th century ===
The 10th century was marked by the decline in trading activities. In the South-East Asia campaign of Rajendra I against Srivijaya and Tambralinga in 1030, according to the Tanjore inscription, a polity named Talaittakkōlam in Tamil, which is identified with Takkola, was one of the cities on the Malay Peninsula raided by the Chola navy. The spatiotemporal analysis and the unearthed archaeological evidence indicate that Takkola’s commercial center migrated southward over time. This is possibly due to the emergence of other more powerful states to the south, such as Pan Pan and Srivijaya, which forced transpeninsula routes to shift southward or even to be abandoned because of the increase in circum-peninsula traffic.

The kingdom was overthrown by the Burmese from Pagan in 1050-1057 and then became the Pagan's dependency. Since Burmese domination on the west coast of the Malay Peninsula did not at the period in question extend any further south than Tenasserim, it is possible that the ruler of Ligor (Tambralinga) on the other side of the peninsula took this advantage to annex Junk Ceylon (Phuket) and the neighbouring districts on the mainland. Burmese chronicles describe the fall of Thaton in 1057 but mention no conquest farther south. Nevertheless, some archaeological remains do give the impression that the Burmese armies conquered territories much farther to the south, probably attracted by the reputation for wealth of the entrepot port of Mergui-Tenasserim region. The invasion of Pagan on the Kra Isthmus resulting in the wars between Pagan and the Chola, who controlled trading routes on the peninsula at the time mentioned.

The inscription dated 1196–98 gives the border of Pagan south to Dawei and further down to the south of Junk Ceylon (Phuket). However, this claim remains disputed as Michel Jacq-Hergoualc'h speculated that the polities in the Mergui-Tenasserim region most probably enjoyed the status of chiefdom during the period under consideration. In 1269, the Mergui Tenasserim portion was the vassal of Pagan, while the remaining south was of Tambralinga, which itself later became part of Siam.

In the 13th century, Malay people referred to the coastline area from Phang Nga to Phuket as Ujong Salang.
