= Bang Rin =

Bang Rin บางริ้น
- Town Municipality
- Seal

- Location in Thailand
- Coordinates: 9°57′11″N 98°38′3″E
- Country: Thailand
- Province: Ranong
- District: Mueang Ranong

Area
  - Total: 78.7 km^{2} (30.4 sq mi)

Population (2024)
  - Total: 22,745
  - Density: 5,290/km^{2} (13,700/sq mi)
- Time zone: UTC+7 (ICT)
- Postal code: 85000
- Calling code: 077
- ISO 3166 code: TH-850104
- Website: bangrin.go.th

Bang Rin (Thai: บางริ้น) is a town municipality (Thesaban Mueang) in Mueang Ranong district of Ranong province in Southern Thailand, and the location of the Ranong's provincial offices. In 2024, Bang Rin had a total population of 22,745 people.

== Geography ==
The general topography of the area is mountainous in the east and flat in the central part and mangrove forests along the Andaman Sea in the west. Neighboring subdistricts are (from the northwest clockwise): Pak Nam, Khao Niwet, Bang Non, Hat Som Paen and Ngao.

== History ==
Bang Rin subdistrict administrative organization-SAO (ongkan borihan suan tambon) was established on 3 March 1995. Subsequent upgrade to subdistrict-municipality (thesaban tambon) and later to town-municipality (thesaban mueang) on 24 April 2013.

== Administrative divisions ==
=== Central government ===
The administration of Bang Rin town is responsible for Bang Rin subdistrict (tambon) with 49,158 rai ~ 78.7 square kilometres (30.4 sq mi) and 22,745 people of 16,894 households. Bang Rin is divided into six villages (muban).

| No. | Villages | Thai | Pop. |
|---|---|---|---|
| 1. | Bang Klang | บางกลาง | 5,738 |
| 2. | Bang Rin | บางริ้น | 3,575 |
| 3. | Phon Rang | พรรั้ง | 1,412 |
| 4. | Ranong Phatthana | ระนองพัฒนา | 3,931 |
| 5. | Phae Mai | แพใหน่ | 4,301 |
| 6. | Bang Klang Bon | บางกลางบน | 3,788 |
| | | Total | 22,745 |

=== Local government ===
Bang Rin town municipality (thesaban mueang) covers the whole Bang Rin subdistrict.

== Healthcare ==
There is Mittraphap Bang Rin Subdistrict health-promoting hospital in Moo6.

== Education ==
There are three primary schools and one secondary school in the subdistrict.

== Economy ==
People of village 1, 2 and 3 are engaged in agriculture, growing crops such as: rubber, coconut, mango, longan, mangosteen and durian.
People are fishermen or work in the eight fish and seafood processing factories.

== Religion ==
Most of the people in the municipality are Buddhist. There are two Buddhist temples and there are a Mosque and a Christian church.

=== Temples ===
The following active temples, where Theravada Buddhism is practised by local residents:

| Temple name | Thai | Location |
|---|---|---|
| Wat Pa Chai Mongkhon | วัดป่าชัยมงคล | Moo3 |
| Wat Samakkhitham | วัดสามัคคีธรรม | Moo2 |
