= Pan Pan (kingdom) =

Hindu kingdom on the Malay Peninsula

- 3rd century CE–7th century CE
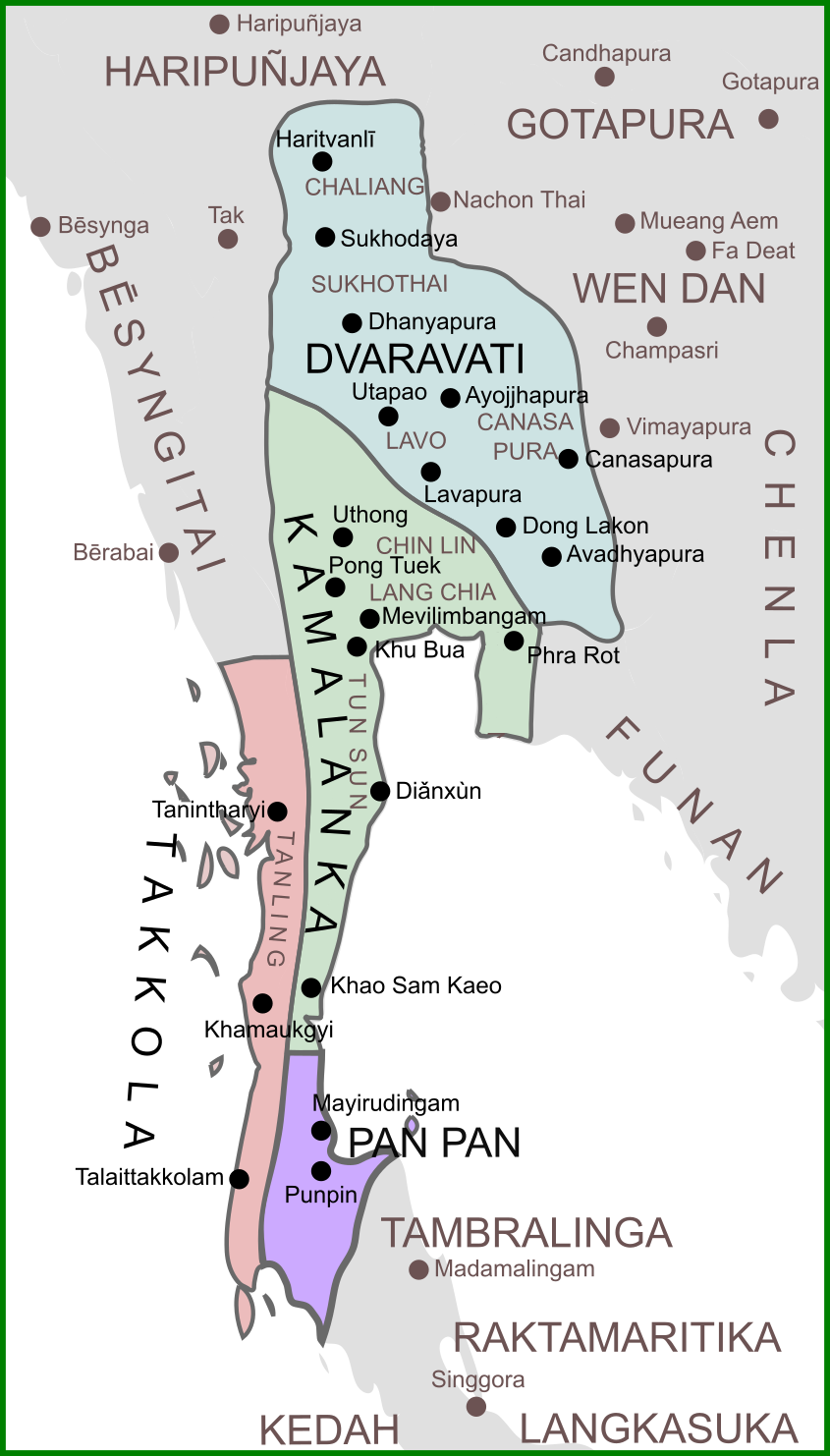
- Political entities in the Chao Phraya River Basin and the Kra Isthmus in the 6th–7th century
- Common languages: Old Malay
- Religion: Hinduism
- Government: Monarchy
- Raja
- History
  - Established: 3rd century CE
  - Disestablished: 7th century CE
Preceded by	Succeeded by
Tun Sun	Srivijaya; Tambralinga
- Today part of: Malaysia; Thailand

Pan Pan or Panpan was a small Hindu kingdom believed to have existed around the 3rd to 7th century CE on the east coast of the Malay Peninsula. Where it lay is not settled, opinion running from somewhere in Kelantan or Terengganu in modern-day Malaysia to the vicinity of Phunphin district, Surat Thani province, in modern Thailand.

It sent embassies to the Chinese courts from the fifth century to the seventh, and the Chinese dynastic histories describe its court, its officers and the brahmans who sought endowments there. It was taken by Srivijaya in the eighth century.

== Location ==
According to the Chinese text Jiu Tang Shu, Pan Pan was bordered in the south with Langkasuka, and to the north with Tun Sun. Briggs held that Pan Pan took in Takola and the Takola-Bandon route and reached the northern end of the Kra Isthmus, where it bordered Tun Sun. Jacq-Hergoualc'h speculates that the border may have been south of Nakhon Si Thammarat, possibly near Songkhla.

It is speculated to be related to the Patani Kingdom, which occupied the same area many centuries later, and has some differences in culture and language to other Malay regions nearby.

== History ==
Little is known about this kingdom. After the northern neighbor Tun Sun gained independence from Funan and became Lang-chia or Lang-ya-hsiu in the late 5th century CE, its northern territory became part of Dvaravati.

Pan Pan sent its first missions to the Chinese Liu Song dynasty between 424 CE and 453 Kenneth R. Hall placed the start of these missions in the period when Funan lost its hold on the sea route, after which peninsular centres began to deal with the Chinese court directly. From here, Kaundinya II is said to have tried to re-introduce Hinduism to the Kingdom of Funan on the other side of the Gulf of Siam.

Hall also read the account of the fifth-century succession at Funan in the Book of Liang as the accession of Pan Pan's own ruler to the Funan throne. He held that Pan Pan was probably governed at that time by a kin group related to the Funan royal house, and that its patronage of Indian brahmans was older than Funan's. Briggs instead had Kaundinya II only pass through Pan Pan on his way to Funan.

Pan Pan sent tribute to the Liang dynasty and the Chen dynasty of China. in 529, 533, 534, 535 and 571 and again under the Sui dynasty during the Daye era (605–618). In 616 and 637, Pan Pan sent tribute to the Chinese Tang dynasty.

The kingdom was later conquered by Srivijaya under the leadership of Dharmasetu before 775.

The stela known as the Ligor inscription was erected in what Arlo Griffiths describes as the ancient realm of Panpan, at Nakhon Si Thammarat or at Chaiya, which of the two being unsettled. Its face A was issued by a Śrīvijayan king in 775, and a Śailendra king left a record on face B of the same stone, most likely somewhat later. The script of face B is distinct from that of face A and is identical to the cursive script of ninth-century inscriptions of Java. Griffiths takes the stela to imply some presence of representatives of archipelago polities that far north, and refers the dispute over its historical significance and its provenance to Michel Jacq-Hergoualc'h.

Though rare, archeological discoveries show evidence of a lively economic flowering in the region through international maritime trade. Jacq-Hergoualc'h has also pointed to ornamental and architectural connections between monuments in the realm of former Panpan, the temples of Pāṇḍuraṅga in Champa such as Hoà Lai, and the monumental art of central Java.

== Chinese accounts ==
Several Chinese dynastic histories describe Pan Pan (盤盤). They place it on the southern sea west of Linyi, separated from it to the north by a narrow sea, about forty days by ship from Jiaozhou, and neighbouring Langyaxiu. The Old Book of Tang states that its people all studied brahmanical texts and honoured the Buddha's teaching, and records a tributary mission in the ninth year of the Zhenguan era. The New Book of Tang and the Tongdian add that its people lived along the water and fenced their settlements with bamboo or timber, that there were no walled districts, and that arrowheads were made of stone.

The same works describe the court. The king, named Yang Suqu (楊栗瞿), sat on a golden dragon throne, and officials attending him knelt and crossed their arms over their shoulders. His father is named as Yang Dewu (楊德武), and the records note that nothing was preserved of any generation before him, so that the two form the only sequence of Pan Pan rulers recoverable from the Chinese material. Four ranks of officer are named, Bolang Suolan (勃郎索濫), Kunlun Diye (昆侖帝也), Kunlun Bohe (昆侖勃和) and Kunlun Bonan Sugan (昆侖勃喃素甘); the element Kunlun is noted as close in sound to Gulong (古龍). Brahmans from India were numerous and sought endowments from the king, who is said to have held them in respect. Monasteries and temples housed both monks, who ate meat but abstained from liquor, and ascetics who called themselves brahmans and abstained from both. Miriam Stark notes that the documentary records for the mainland generally describe small competing principalities in which power rarely passed to a ruler's offspring.

Tributary missions are recorded in some number. The Book of Liang notes embassies during the Yuanjia (424–453), Xiaojian (454–456) and Daming (457–464) eras, and a letter brought by an embassy in 527 in which the king addressed the Chinese emperor in Buddhist terms. Further missions are entered under the Zhongdatong and Dabao eras, one of them presenting a trained elephant. The records also place Pan Pan in relation to its neighbours: Tuoheluo (Dvaravati) is said to lie to its north, with Jialasheefo (迦羅舍佛) beyond, and Geluo (哥羅) to its south-east.

The name also appears in the Funan king list. A Pan Pan (盤盤) is named there as the middle son of Pankuang, who reigned three years before Fan Shiman was raised to the throne. The brahman Kaundinya is said to have reached Pan Pan on his way south before the people of Funan made him king.

== See also ==
- Nakhon Si Thammarat
- Bujang Valley
- History of Kedah
