= La-un district =

La-un ละอุ่น
- District
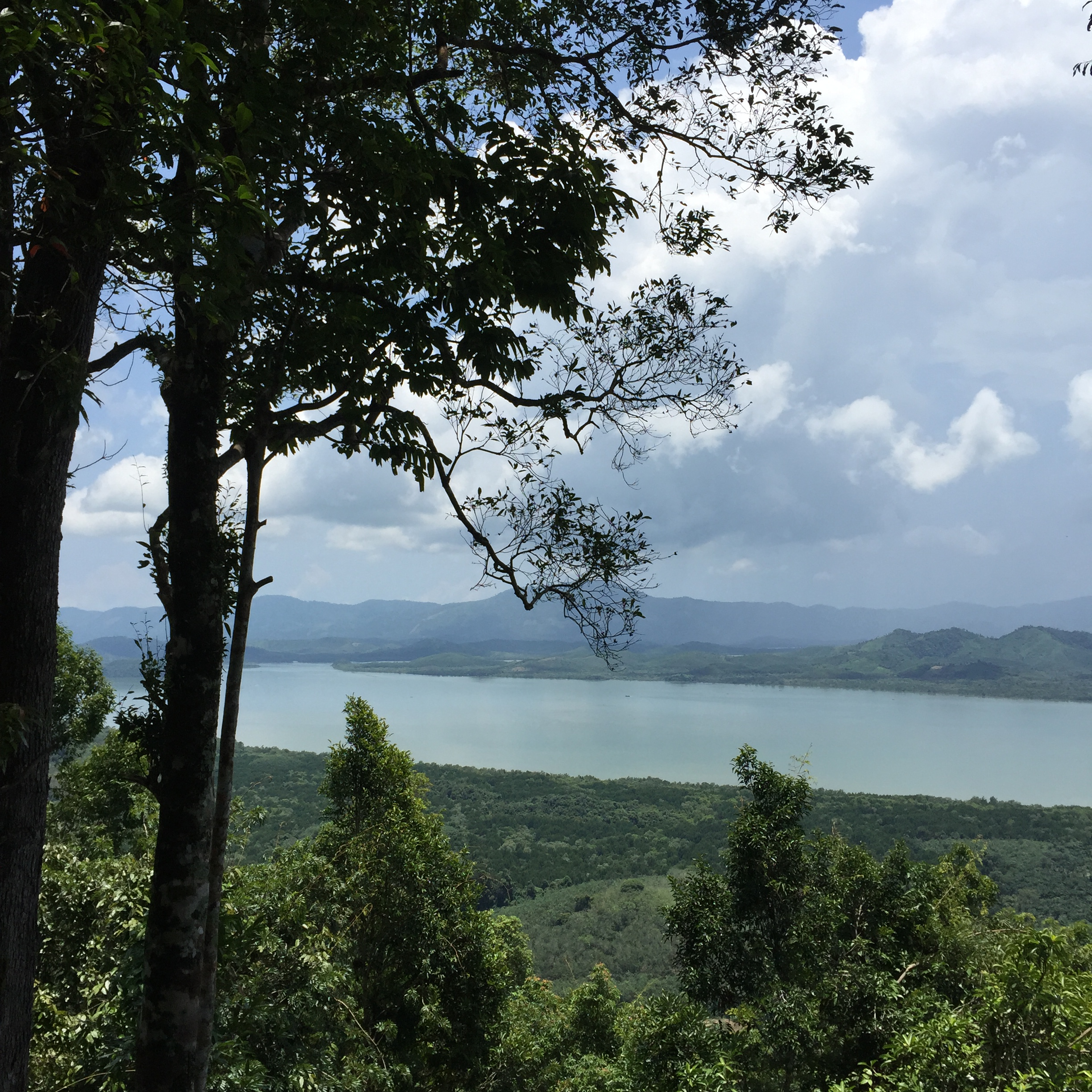
- Kraburi River from Bang Kaeo

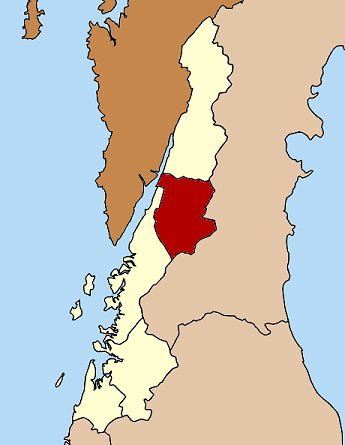
- District location in Ranong province
- Coordinates: 10°6′54″N 98°45′0″E
- Country: Thailand
- Province: Ranong
- Seat: La-un Tai

Area
  - Total: 748.5 km^{2} (289.0 sq mi)

Population (2023)
  - Total: 15,240
  - Density: 20/km^{2} (52/sq mi)
- Time zone: UTC+7 (ICT)
- ISO 3166 code: TH-8502
- Postal code: 85130

La-un (Thai: ละอุ่น, pronounced [lā.ʔùn]) is a district (amphoe) of Ranong province, southern Thailand.

== History ==
In 1932 the minor district (king amphoe) was established as a subordinate of Mueang Ranong district. On 28 June 1973, it was upgraded to a full district. In 1996, a new district office was built.

== Geography ==
Neighboring districts are (from the north clockwise) Kra Buri of Ranong Province, Sawi, Lang Suan and Phato of Chumphon province, and Mueang Ranong of Ranong. To the west across the estuary of the Kraburi River is the Tanintharyi Division of Myanmar.

== Administration ==
=== Central government ===
The district is divided into seven subdistricts (tambons), which are further subdivided into 30 villages (muban).

No.	Subdistricts	Thai	Villages	Pop.
1.	La-un Tai	ละอุ่นใต้	6	1,661
2.	La-un Nuea	ละอุ่นเหนือ	5	1,177
3.	Bang Phra Tai	บางพระใต้	3	968
4.	Bang Phra Nuea	บางพระเหนือ	5	3,624
5.	Bang Kaew	บางแก้ว	5	4,612
6.	Nai Wong Nuea	ในวงเหนือ	3	1,669
7.	Nai Wong Tai	ในวงใต้	3	1,529
		Total	30	15,240

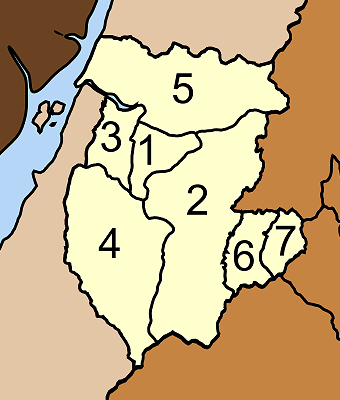
Map of subdistricts

=== Local government ===
La-un is a subdistrict municipality (thesaban tambon) and covers subdistricts La-un Tai and Bang Phra Tai. There are further three subdistrict administrative organizations - SAO (ongkan borihan suan tambon - o bo to): Bang Kaew and Bang Phra Nuea cover the whole subdistricts, La-un Nuea covers the three subdistricts La-un Nuea, Nai Wong Nuea and Nai Wong Tai.

La-un subdistrict municipality	Pop.	tesabanlaun.go.th
La-un Tai	1,661	
Bang Phra Tai	968	
Total	2,629	

La-un Nuea - SAO	Pop.	launnuae.go.th
La-un Nuea	1,177	
Nai Wong Nuea	1,669	
Nai Wong Tai	1,529	
Total	4,375	

Subd.adm.org-SAO	Pop.	website
Bangkaew SAO	4,612	bangkaew.go.th
Bang Phra Nuea SAO	3,624	bangphranuae.go.th

== Healthcare ==
=== Hospital ===
There is community hospital in La-un district with 16 beds.

=== Health promoting hospitals ===
There are total eight health-promoting hospitals in the district, of which; one in La-un Tai, La-un Nuea, Nai Wong Nuea and Nai Wong Tai and two in Bang Phra Nuea and Bang Kaeo.

== Religion ==
There are nine Theravada Buddhist temples in the district.
One in La-un Tai, Bang Phra Tai and Nai Wong Nuea, two in La-un Nuea, Bang Phra Nuea and Bang Kaew.
