= Phato district =

Phato พะโต๊ะ
- District
- District location in Chumphon province
- Coordinates: 9°47′30″N 98°46′36″E
- Country: Thailand
- Province: Chumphon
- Seat: Phato

Area
  - Total: 928.0 km^{2} (358.3 sq mi)

Population (2008)
  - Total: 22,633
  - Density: 23.9/km^{2} (62/sq mi)
- Time zone: UTC+7 (ICT)
- Postal code: 86180
- Geocode: 8606

Phato (Thai: พะโต๊ะ, pronounced [pʰā.tóʔ]) is a district (amphoe) of Chumphon province, southern Thailand.

== History ==
Originally Patho was a district of Mueang Lang Suan, which was abolished and included in Chumphon Province in 1932. In 1938 Phato was reduced to a minor district (king amphoe). On 19 June 1991 it was upgraded to a full district.

== Geography ==
Neighboring districts are (from the east clockwise) Lang Suan and Lamae of Chumphon Province, Tha Chana and Chaiya of Surat Thani province, Kapoe, Mueang Ranong, and La-un of Ranong province.

Within the Kuan Mae Yai Mon Wildlife Sanctuary in the southwest of the district is the Heo Lom waterfall, one of the attractions of the district. The terrain is mostly mountainous with several small rivers, which make it a popular place for rafting.

== Symbols ==
The slogan of the district is "Green hills, go rafting, see fog cover, beautiful waterfall, famous for fruits."

== Administration ==
The district is divided into four sub-districts (tambons), which are further subdivided into 43 villages (mubans). The sub-district municipality (thesaban tambon) Phato covers part of the tambon Phato, the sub-district municipality Pak Song the entire sub-district of the same name. There are a further three tambon administrative organizations.

No.	Name	Thai	Villages	Pop.
1.	Phato	พะโต๊ะ	19	8,491
2.	Pak Song	ปากทรง	8	4,743
3.	Pang Wan	ปังหวาน	7	4,964
4.	Phra Rak	พระรักษ์	9	4,435

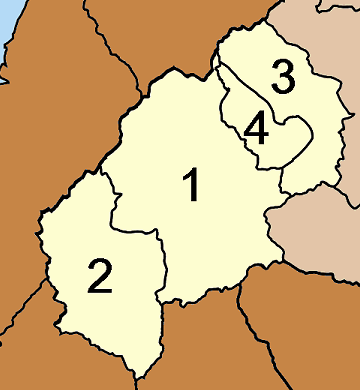
