= Mueang Ranong district =

Mueang Ranong เมืองระนอง
- District
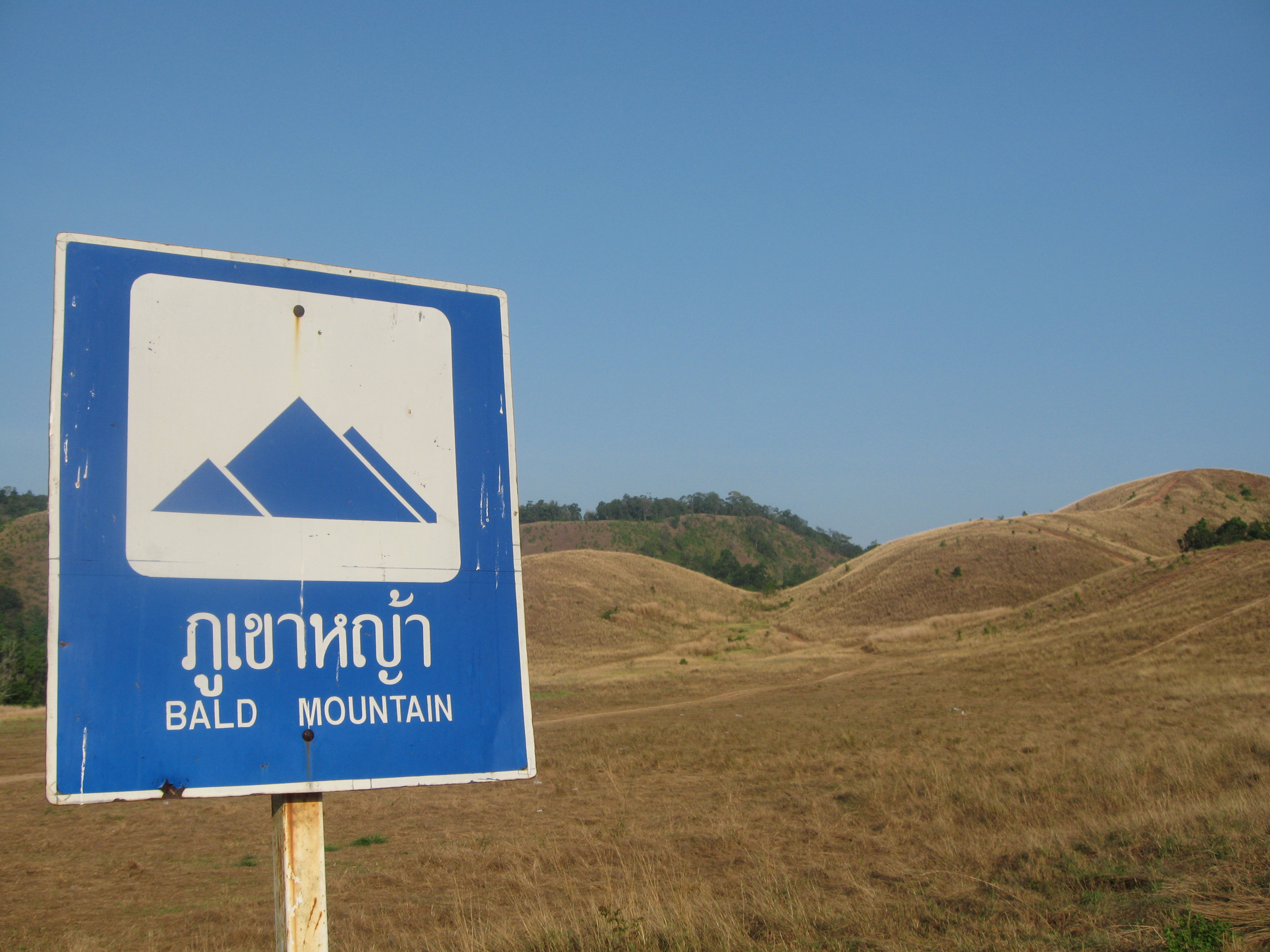
- Phu Khao Ya landmark and local attraction

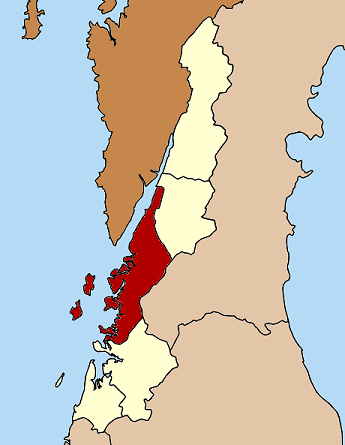
- District location in Ranong province
- Coordinates: 9°58′2″N 98°38′2″E
- Country: Thailand
- Province: Ranong
- Seat: Khao Niwet

Area
  - Total: 713.7 km^{2} (275.6 sq mi)

Population (2023)
  - Total: 93,271
  - Density: 130/km^{2} (340/sq mi)
- Time zone: UTC+7 (ICT)
- ISO 3166 code: TH-8501
- Postal code: 85000
- Sai Daeng: 85130

Mueang Ranong (Thai: เมืองระนอง) is the capital district (amphoe mueang) of Ranong province, in southern Thailand.

== Geography ==
Neighboring districts are (from the north clockwise) La-un of Ranong Province, Phato of Chumphon province, and Kapoe of Ranong. To the west across the Kraburi River estuary is the Tanintharyi Division of Myanmar.

== Administration ==
=== Central government ===
The district is divided into nine subdistricts (tambons), which are further subdivided into 38 villages (muban).

No.	Subdistricts	Thai	Villages	Pop.
1.	Khao Niwet	เขานิเวศน์	-	17,779
2.	Ratchakrut	ราชกรูด	8	9,766
3.	Ngao	หงาว	5	9,539
4.	Bang Rin	บางริ้น	6	22,830
5.	Pak Nam	ปากน้ำ	6	10,456
6.	Bang Non	บางนอน	4	14,443
7.	Hat Som Paen	หาดส้มแป้น	3	3,191
8.	Sai Daeng	ทรายแดง	4	3,981
9.	Koh Phayam	เกาะพยาม	2	1,286
		Total	38	93,271

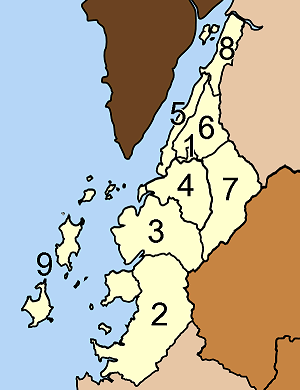
Map of districts

=== Local government ===
As of December 2023 there are two town municipalities (thesaban mueang), Ranong covers subdistrict Khao Niwet, while Bang Rin covers the whole subdistrict. Five subdistrict municipalities (thesaban tambon): Ngao, Pak Nam and Pak Nam Tha Ruea cover parts of the subdistricts Ngao and Pak Nam, while Bang Non and Ratchakrut cover the whole subdistrict. There are four subdistrict administrative organizations - SAO (ongkan borihan suan tambon - o bo to): Ngao covers part of the subdistrict and Sai Daeng, Hat Som Paen and Koh Phayam cover the whole subdistricts.

Town municipality	Pop.	website
Bang Rin	22,830	bangrin.go.th
Ranong	17,779	ranongcity.go.th

Subdistrict municipality	Pop.	website
Bang Non	14,443	bangnoncity.go.th
Ratchakrut	9,766	ratchakrudcity.go.th
Pak Nam Tha Ruea	8,071	paknamtarua.go.th
Ngao	2,399	ngaotown-ranong.go.th
Pak Nam	2,385	

Subdistrict adm.org-SAO	Pop.	website
Ngao	7,140	ngao-ranong.go.th
Sai Daeng	3,981	saidang.go.th
Hat Som Paeng	3,191	hatsompaen.go.th
Koh Phayam	1,286	kohphayam.go.th

== Healthcare ==
=== Hospital ===
There is general hospital in Ranong with 300 beds.

=== Health promoting hospitals ===
There are total sixteen health-promoting hospitals in the district, of which; one in Bang Non and Sai Daeng and two in Ratchakrut, Ngao, Bang Rin, Hat Som Paen and Ko Phayam and four in Pak Nam.

== Economy ==
Some people are fishermen or work in the fourteen fish and seafood processing factories:
One in Khao Niwet and Ngao, two in Pak Nam and Bang Non and eight in Bang Rin. Others work in the many food stalls, or family-owned restaurants.

== Religion ==
There are sixteen Theravada Buddhist temples in the district.
One in Ngao, Pak Nam, Bang Non and Sai Daeng, two in Khao Niwet, Bang Rin, Hat Som Paen and Koh Phayam, four in Ratchakrut.
