= Phu Khao Ya =

Coordinates: 9.879353°N 98.593259°E

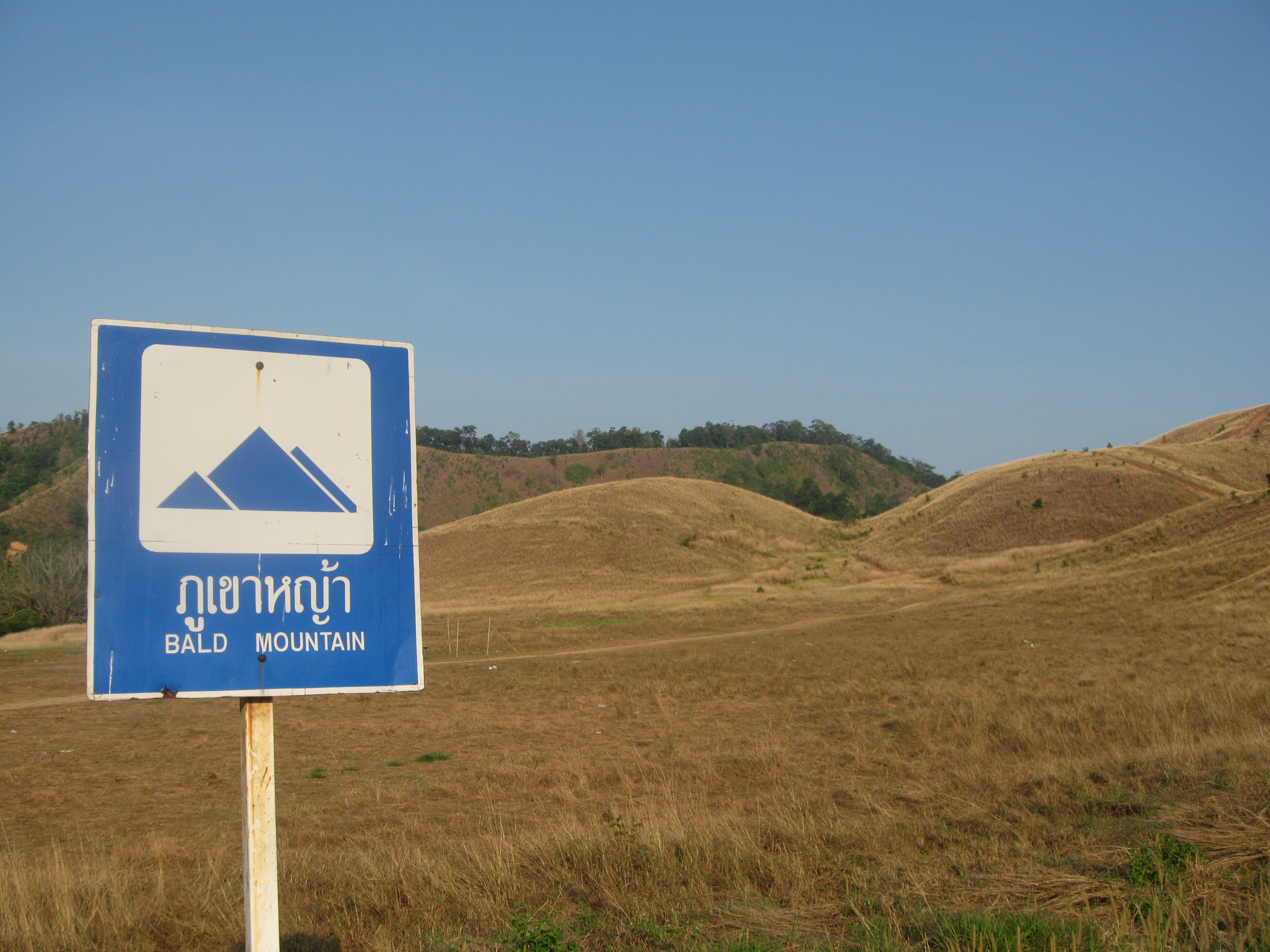
Phu Khao Ya in 2010

Phu Khao Ya (Thai: ภูเขาหญ้า, pronounced [pʰūː kʰǎw jâː], lit. 'grass mountain') or Khao Hua Lan (Thai: เขาหัวล้าน, pronounced [kʰǎw hǔə láːn], lit. 'bald mountain') is a series of 3–4 hills or small mountains extending continuously from north to south. It is located in Ranong province, where it is considered an important landmark and tourist attraction. The mountains are located on the outskirts of Ranong city, approximately 12 km (7.5 mi) south of the city. It is a mountain without any trees, with only grass covering the entire area. Hence the names, Phu Khao Ya or Khao Hua Lan.

The mountains offers a nice even layer of grass which provides very different scenery during the rainy season (May–October), the grass will be green and cover the entire mountain range. Moreover, after the rain it may be covered with mist. During the dry season (November–April), the grass dries up and turns brown. It is considered an unusual and difficult to find scenery due to the mountains changing their colours according to the seasons and also with the time of day.
