= Kapoe district =

Kapoe กะเปอร์
- District
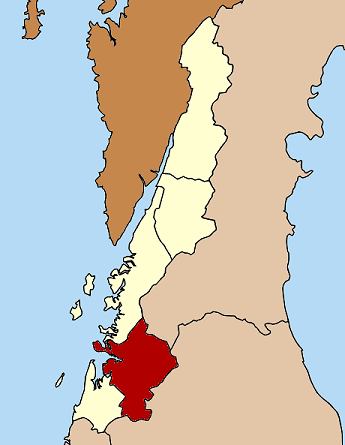
- District location in Ranong province
- Coordinates: 9°35′7″N 98°35′46″E
- Country: Thailand
- Province: Ranong

Area
  - Total: 657.7 km^{2} (253.9 sq mi)

Population (2023)
  - Total: 22,093
  - Density: 33/km^{2} (85/sq mi)
- Time zone: UTC+7 (ICT)
- ISO 3166 code: TH-8503
- Postal code: 85120

Kapoe (Thai: กะเปอร์, pronounced [kā.pɤ̄ː]) is a district (amphoe) of Ranong province, southern Thailand.

== Geography ==
Neighboring districts are (from the north clockwise) Mueang Ranong of Ranong Province, Phato of Chumphon province, Chaiya, Tha Chang and Ban Ta Khun of Surat Thani province, and Suk Samran of Ranong. To the west is the Andaman Sea.

The southeastern part of the district is part of the Khlong Nakha Wildlife Sanctuary. The mangrove forests in the estuary of the Kapoe River are part of the Ranong Biosphere Reserve.

== Administration ==
=== Central government ===
The district is divided into five subdistricts (tambons), which are further subdivided into 34 villages (muban).

No.	Subdistrict	Thai	Villages	Pop.
1.	Muang Kluang	ม่วงกลวง	4	4,481
2.	Kapoe	กะเปอร์	10	7,717
3.	Chiao Liang	เชี่ยวเหลียง	7	2,012
4.	Ban Na	บ้านนา	8	3,436
5.	Bang Hin	บางหิน	5	4,447
		Total	34	22,093

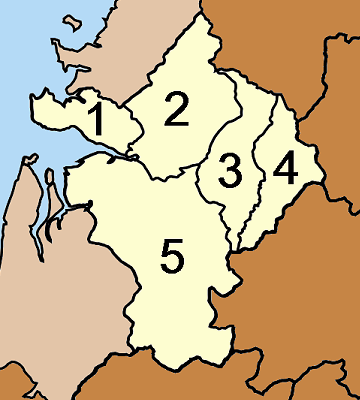
Map of subdistricts

=== Local government ===
Kapoe is a subdistrict municipality (thesaban tambon) and covers part of the subdistrict Kapoe. There are five subdistrict administrative organizations - SAO (ongkan borihan suan tambon - o bo to): Kapoe, Muang Kluang, Bang Hin, Ban Na and Chiao Liang.

Subdistrict municipality	Pop.	website
Kapoe subdistrict municipality	1,485	kapercity.go.th

Subd.adm.org.-SAO	Pop.	website
Kapoe SAO	6,232	kaper.go.th
Muang Kluang SAO	4,481	muangkluang.go.th
Bang Hin SAO	4,447	banghin.go.th
Ban Na SAO	3,436	bannasao.go.th
Chiao Liang SAO	2,012	

== Healthcare ==
=== Hospitals ===
There is community hospital in Kapoe district with 35 beds.

=== Health promoting hospitals ===
There are total six health-promoting hospitals in the district, of which; one in Muang Kluang and Chiao Liang and two in Ban Na and Bang Hin.

== Religion ==
There are seven Theravada Buddhist temples in the district.
One in Chiao Liang, two in Kapoe and four in Ban Na.
