= Suk Samran district =

Suk Samran สุขสำราญ
- District
- District location in Ranong province
- Coordinates: 9°20′41″N 98°25′46″E
- Country: Thailand
- Province: Ranong
- Seat: Kamphuan

Area
  - Total: 395.0 km^{2} (152.5 sq mi)

Population (2023)
  - Total: 14,594
  - Density: 37/km^{2} (96/sq mi)
- Time zone: UTC+7 (ICT)
- ISO 3166 code: TH-8505
- Postal code: 85120

Suk Samran (Thai: สุขสำราญ, pronounced [sùk sǎm.rāːn]) is a district (amphoe) of Ranong province, southern Thailand.

== History ==
The district was created on 1 April 1992 by splitting off the southern part of Kapoe district. On 15 May 2007, all 81 minor districts were upgraded to full districts. On 24 August the upgrade became official.

== Geography ==
Neighboring districts are (from the north clockwise) Kapoe of Ranong Province, Ban Ta Khun of Surat Thani province, and Khura Buri of Phang Nga province. To the west is the Andaman Sea.

The eastern half of the district is part of the Khlong Nakha Wildlife Sanctuary.

== Administration ==
=== Central government ===
The district is divided into two subdistricts (tambons), which are further subdivided into 15 villages (muban).

| No. | Subdistrict | Thai | Villages | Pop. |
|---|---|---|---|---|
| 1. | Nakha | นาคา | 8 | 7,565 |
| 2. | Kamphuan | กำพวน | 7 | 7,029 |
| | | Total | 15 | 14,594 |

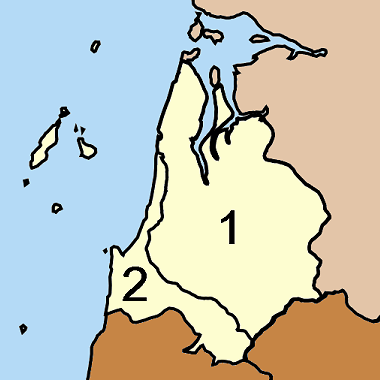
Map of Subdistricts

=== Local government ===
As of December 2023 there is Kamphuan subdistrict municipality (thesaban tambon) and Nakha subdistrict administrative organization - SAO (ongkan borihan suan tambon - o bo to).

| Kamphuan subdistrict mun. | 7,029 | kumpuan.go.th |

| Nakha subd.adm.org. - SAO | 7,565 | naka.go.th |

== Healthcare ==
=== Hospital ===
There is community hospital in Suk Samran district with 10 beds.

=== Health promoting hospitals ===
There are total four health-promoting hospitals in the district, both Nakha and Kamphuan have two.

== Religion ==
There are two Theravada Buddhist temples in the district.
One in both Nakha and Kamphuan.
