= Kra Buri district =

Kra Buri กระบุรี
- District
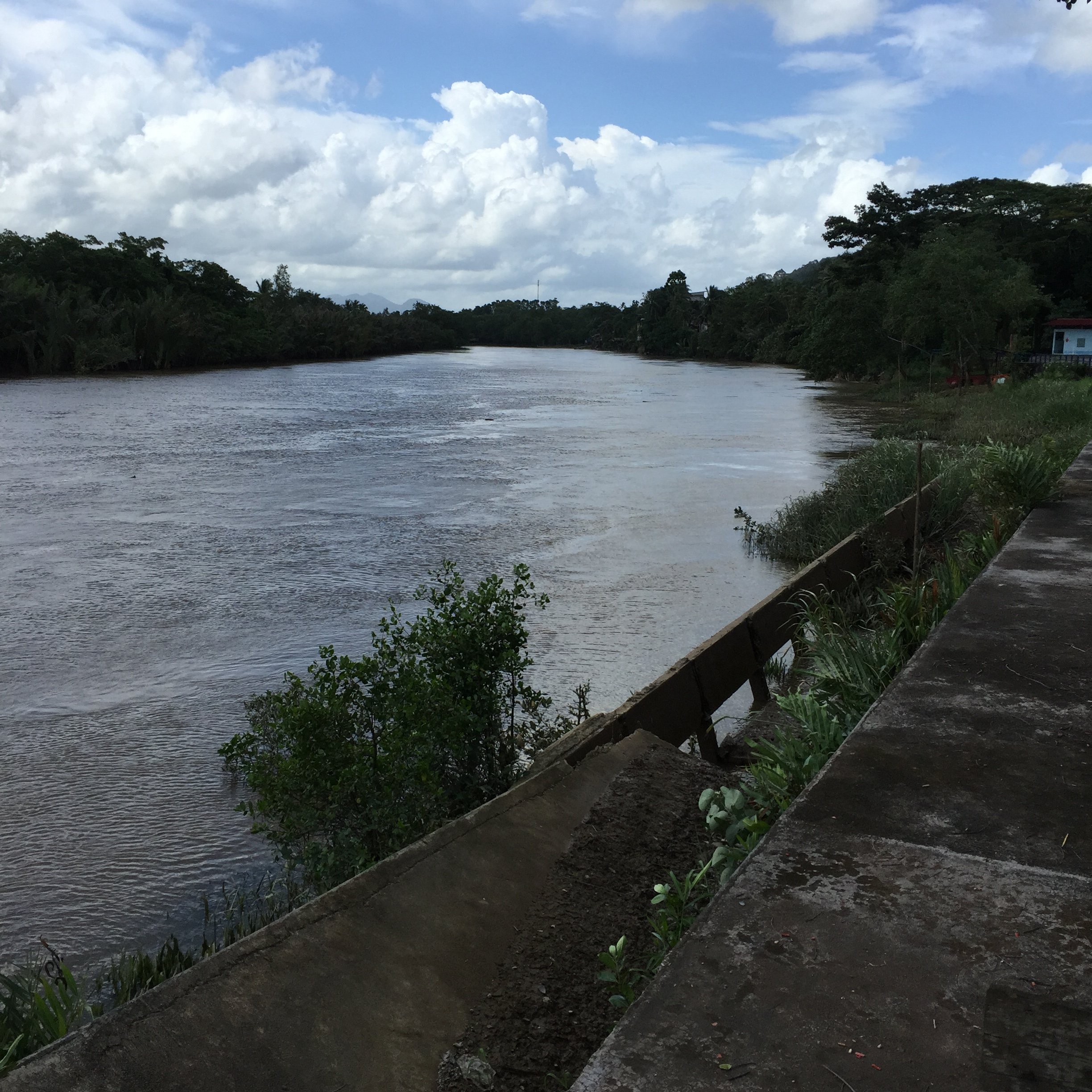
- Kraburi River at Mamu

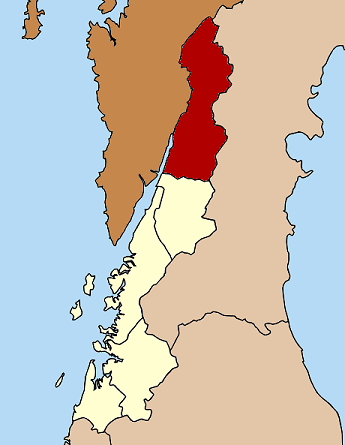
- District location in Ranong province
- Coordinates: 10°25′54″N 98°47′18″E
- Country: Thailand
- Province: Ranong

Area
  - Total: 783.0 km^{2} (302.3 sq mi)

Population (2023)
  - Total: 48,163
  - Density: 62/km^{2} (160/sq mi)
- Time zone: UTC+7 (ICT)
- ISO 3166 code: TH-8504
- Postal code: 85110

Kra Buri (Thai: กระบุรี, pronounced [kràʔ bū.rīː]) is the northernmost district (amphoe) of Ranong province, southern Thailand.

== History ==
Mueang Tra (or Kra) was established during the Ayutthaya Kingdom as a fourth class city under Chumphon. The first governor was Mr. Kaew, a cousin of the governor of Nakhon Si Thammarat. Later he was promoted to be Phra Kaew Korop (พระแก้วโกรพ). Mueang Tra was set to be a frontier town of Ayutthaya. The old town center was in Tambon (subdistrict) Pak Chan. In 1884 Phra Atsadongkhotthitraksa (พระอัษฎงคตทิศรักษา) moved it to Tambon Nam Chuet as being better commercially and strategically.

Mueang Tra faced attacks by the Burmese two times, in 1764 during the reign of King Ekkathat and in 1786 in the reign of King Rama I of Rattanakosin. During World War II Japanese troops set Tra as their western division location, and built a railway from Kra Buri via La-un to Mueang Ranong.

Kra Buri was downgraded to a district of Ranong Province around 1896. Around this time, Prince Damrong noted that the area was full of Chinese workers who worked in the tin mine.

== Geography ==
Neighboring districts are (from the northeast clockwise) are: Tha Sae, Mueang Chumphon, and Sawi of Chumphon province; La-un of Ranong Province. To the west is the Tanintharyi Division of Myanmar.

The important water resource is the Kraburi River. Its long estuary is protected as a Ramsar wetland.

Kra Buri lies between the Tenasserim Range and the Kraburi River, about 65 km (40 mi) from Chumphon Province and 58 km (36 mi) from Mueang Ranong.

== Administration ==
=== Central government ===
The district is divided into seven subdistricts (tambons), which are further subdivided into 61 villages (mubans).

No.	Subdistrict	Thai	Villages	Pop.
1.	Nam Chuet	น้ำจืด	9	7,750
2.	Nam Chuet Noi	น้ำจืดน้อย	6	3,033
3.	Mamu	มะมุ	8	4,815
4.	Pak Chan	ปากจั่น	11	6,956
5.	Lam Liang	ลำเลียง	11	9,452
6.	Choporo	จ.ป.ร.	11	12,950
7.	Bang Yai	บางใหญ่	5	3,207
		Total	61	48,163

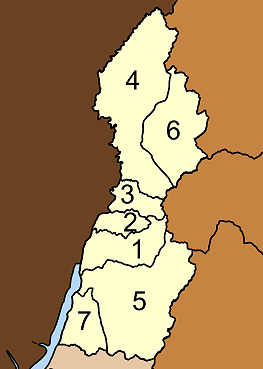
Map of subdistricts

=== Local government ===
As of December 2023 there are two subdistrict municipalities (thesaban tambon) Nam Chuet and Choporo. Nam Chuet covers parts of the subdistrict and Choporo covers the whole subdistrict. There are further six subdistrict administrative organizations - SAO (ongkan borihan suan tambon - o bo to) for the non-municipal areas.

Subdistrict municipality	Pop.	website
Choporo	12,950	jpr.go.th
Nam Chuet	3,503	namchuet.go.th

Subdistrict adm. org-SAO	Pop.	website
Lam Liang	9,452	lumliang.go.th
Pak Chan	6,956	saopakjan.go.th
Mamu	4,815	mamu.go.th
Nam Chuet	4,247	numjued.go.th
Bang Yai	3,207	bangyai-kraburi.go.th
Nam Chuet Noi	3,033	numjuednoi.go.th

== Healthcare ==
=== Hospital ===
There is community hospital in Kra Buri district with 30 beds.

=== Health promoting hospitals ===
There are total eleven health-promoting hospitals in the district, of which; one in Nam Chuet Noi and Bang Yai and two in Mamu, Lam Liang and Choporo and three in Pak Chan.

== Religion ==
There are twelve Theravada Buddhist temples in the district.
One in Nam Chuet Noi and Pak Chan, two in Nam Chuet, Mamu and Lam Liang and four in Choporo.

== Products ==
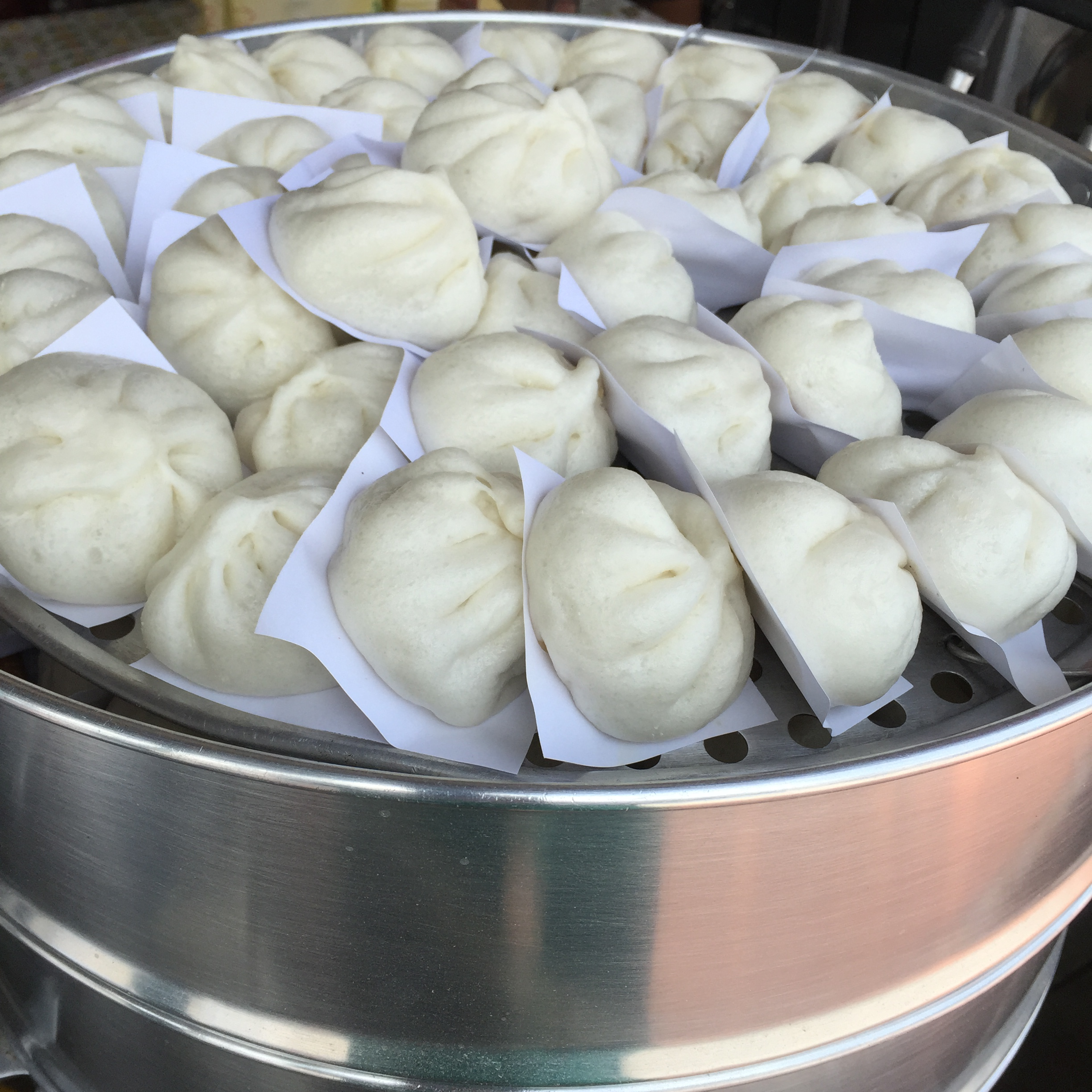
Salapao Tub Lee (ซาลาเปาทับหลี) of Ban Tub Lee

Ban Tub Lee in Mamu Subdistrict is the origin of Salapao Tub Lee, a Thai bun which is famous and has franchises spread all over the country.

== See also ==
- Tan Kim Ching
