= Kraburi River =

Thailand-Myanmar boundary river

Coordinates: 10°02′N 98°36′E

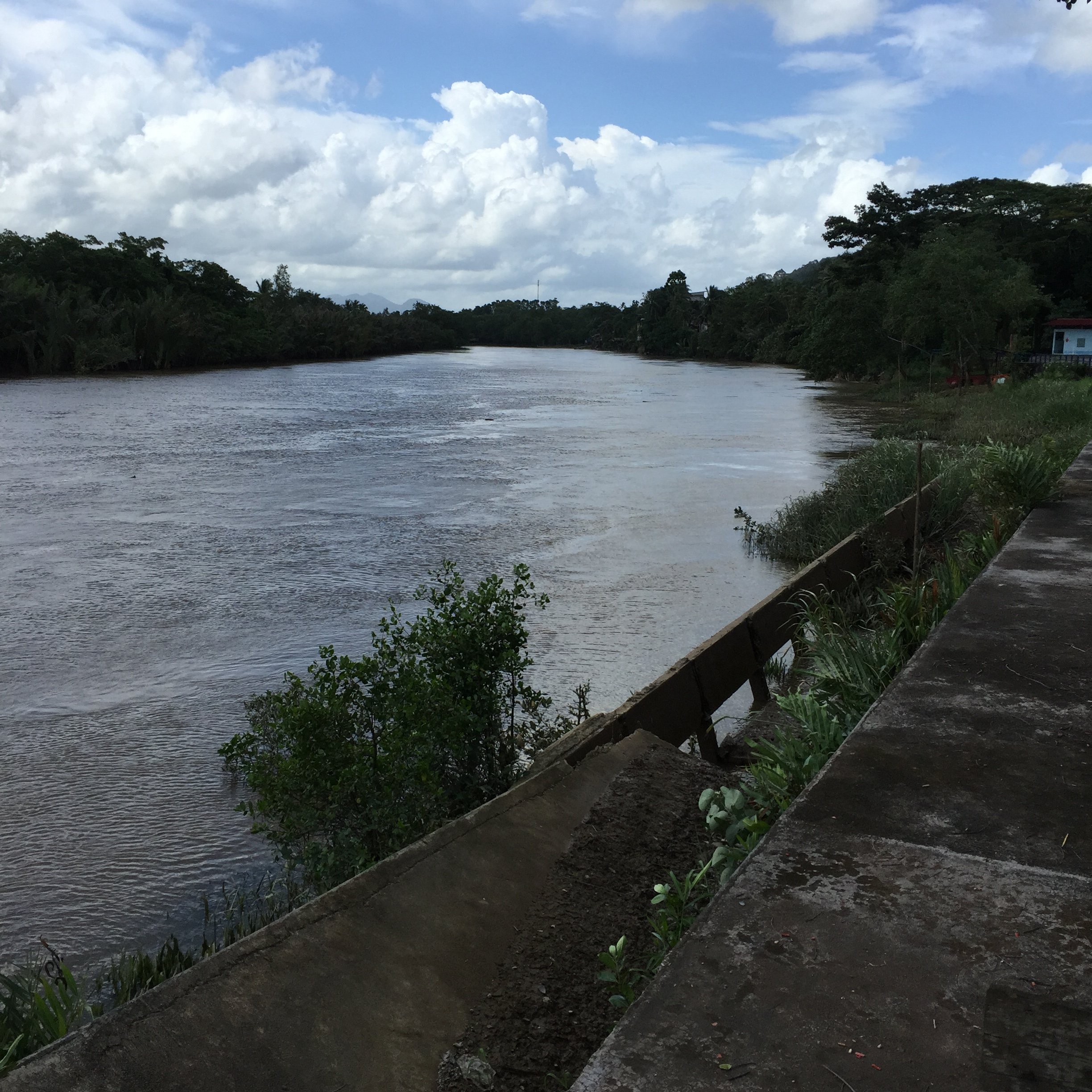
Kraburi River, Mamu, Kra Buri District, Ranong

The Kraburi River (Thai: แม่น้ำกระบุรี, RTGS: Maenam Kra Buri, pronounced [mɛ̂ːnáːm kràʔ buriː]; Burmese: မြစ်ကြီးနား, BGN/PCGN: myitkyina, Kyan River), also Kra (Thai: กระ) or Pak Chan River (Thai: แม่น้ำปากจั่น), is the boundary river between Thailand and Myanmar at the Kra Isthmus of the Malay Peninsula. The river has its source in the Tenasserim Hills and flows into the Andaman Sea near the Thai town of Ranong and Kawthaung (Victoria Point), Myanmar.

At its mouth, the river is a 6-kilometre (3.7 mi) wide tidal estuary, which contains the largest preserved mangrove forests of Thailand. It is a protected area. Lam Nam Kra Buri National Park covers most of the Thai side of the estuary, while the Ranong Biosphere Reserve and the Laemson Ramsar Site include areas to the south.

The sovereignty of three Andaman Sea islands at the river's mouth remain disputed. The standing agreement, negotiated in February 1982, left undetermined the status of Ginga Island (Ko Lam), Ko Kham, and Ko Ki Nok at the mouth of the Kraburi River (Pak Chan River). Subsequent negotiations in 1985, 1989, and 1990 made no progress. The two parties have designated the islands as "no man's land". Ongoing tensions in the area resulted in minor clashes in 1998, 2003, and 2013.
