= Kra Isthmus =

Isthmus in Thailand

- Isthmus
- Location within Thailand
- Coordinates: 10°11′00″N 98°53′00″E
- Location: Ranong and Chumphon, Thailand

The Kra Isthmus (Thai: คอคอดกระ, pronounced [kʰɔ̄ː kʰɔ̂ːt kràʔ]; Malay: Segenting Kra), also called the Isthmus of Kra in Thailand, is the narrowest part of the Malay Peninsula. The western part of the isthmus belongs to Ranong province and the eastern part to Chumphon province, both in Southern Thailand. At its narrowest point, between the Thai cities of Kra Buri and Chumphon, the coastal distance between the Andaman Sea and the Gulf of Thailand is only 44 km (27 mi).

The Kra Isthmus marks the boundary between two sections of the mountain chain which runs from Tibet through the Malay peninsula. The southern part is the Phuket Range, which is a continuation of the Tenasserim Hills, extending further northwards for over 400 km (250 mi) beyond the Three Pagodas Pass.

The Kra Isthmus is in the Tenasserim–South Thailand semi-evergreen rain forests ecoregion. Dipterocarps are the dominant trees in the ecoregion.

== Pacific War ==
On 8 December 1941 local time, the Imperial Japanese Army landed in Songkhla, invading Thailand. Because of the International Date Line, this actually occurred hours before the 7 December (Hawaii time) attack on Pearl Harbor, making it the first major action of the Pacific War. Japanese forces then moved south towards Perlis and Penang as part of the Malayan campaign, which culminated in the capture of Singapore.

== Kra Canal ==
The Thai Canal is a long-standing proposal to join the Gulf of Thailand with the Andaman Sea. Various routes were proposed to shortcut voyages from India to China, and avoiding the Strait of Malacca. The northernmost route was championed by Edward O'Riley, a government official in Burma, and Henry Wise, in England, when it was the subject of a report to the British Parliament in 1859 by Consul Robert Schomburk from Bangkok. A later crossing is related by Loftus.
