= Ranong =

Ranong ระนอง
- Town Municipality
- Seal

- Location in Thailand
- Coordinates: 9°57′43″N 98°38′20″E
- Country: Thailand
- Province: Ranong
- District: Mueang Ranong

Area
  - Total: 4.2 km^{2} (1.6 sq mi)
- Elevation: 9.0 m (29.5 ft)

Population (2024)
  - Total: 16,909
  - Density: 4,026/km^{2} (10,430/sq mi)
- Time zone: UTC+7 (ICT)
- Postal code: 85000
- Calling code: 077
- ISO 3166 code: TH-850101
- Website: ranongcity.go.th

Ranong (Thai: ระนอง) is a town (thesaban mueang) in southern Thailand, capital of the Ranong Province and the Mueang Ranong District. The town covers completely the area of the tambon Khao Niwet (เขานิเวศน์). As of 2024, it had a population of 16,909. Ranong lies 586 kilometres (364 mi) south-southwest of Bangkok by road.

== Geography ==
Ranong is on the estuary of the Pak Chan (or Kraburi) River, opposite Myanmar's Kawthaung (formerly Victoria Point). The Tenasserim Hills rise directly to the east of Ranong, and another small ridge runs along the edge of the estuary to the town's north. Neighboring subdistricts are (from north clockwise) Bang Non, Hat Som Paen, Bang Rin and Pak Nam.

== History ==
On 14 March 1936 Ranong sanitary district was elevated to subdistrict municipality.

== Administration ==
=== Central government ===
The administration of Ranong town is responsible for Khao Niwet subdistrict (tambon) with 4.2 square kilometres (1.6 sq mi) and 16,909 people of 8,333 households. Khao Niwet subdistrict is not divided into villages (mubans).

=== Local government ===
Ranong town municipality (thesaban mueang) covers the whole Khao Niwet subdistrict.

== Healthcare ==
=== Hospital ===
There is general hospital in Ranong with 300 beds.

=== Health promoting hospital ===
There is no health-promoting hospital in the town.

== Education ==
There are two schools in the town:

- Ban Khao Niwet municipal school.
- Wat Upanantharam municipal school.

== Religion ==
There are two active temples, where Theravada Buddhism is practised by local residents:

Temple name	Thai
Wat Suwankhiri	วัดสุวรรณคีรี
Wat Uppanantharam	วัดอุปนันทาราม

== Climate ==
Ranong has a tropical monsoon climate (Köppen climate classification Am). There is little variation in the temperature throughout the year, although the pre-monsoon months (February to April) are somewhat hotter in the day. However, Ranong's position to the west of the Tenasserim Hills means that the monsoon season's rains are greatly amplified, resulting in torrential rains from May until October, and significant rainfall in the transition months of April and November.

Climate data for Ranong (1991–2020, extremes 1951-present)
Month	Jan	Feb	Mar	Apr	May	Jun	Jul	Aug	Sep	Oct	Nov	Dec	Year
Record high °C (°F)	36.4 (97.5)	38.3 (100.9)	39.6 (103.3)	39.1 (102.4)	38.7 (101.7)	35.3 (95.5)	34.8 (94.6)	34.0 (93.2)	34.5 (94.1)	35.2 (95.4)	35.4 (95.7)	35.0 (95.0)	39.6 (103.3)
Mean daily maximum °C (°F)	32.5 (90.5)	33.7 (92.7)	34.7 (94.5)	34.5 (94.1)	32.7 (90.9)	31.4 (88.5)	30.9 (87.6)	30.7 (87.3)	30.6 (87.1)	31.1 (88.0)	31.6 (88.9)	31.6 (88.9)	32.2 (89.9)
Daily mean °C (°F)	26.9 (80.4)	27.6 (81.7)	28.5 (83.3)	28.8 (83.8)	28.0 (82.4)	27.4 (81.3)	27.0 (80.6)	27.0 (80.6)	26.6 (79.9)	26.6 (79.9)	26.9 (80.4)	26.6 (79.9)	27.3 (81.2)
Mean daily minimum °C (°F)	22.3 (72.1)	22.5 (72.5)	23.7 (74.7)	24.8 (76.6)	24.9 (76.8)	24.7 (76.5)	24.4 (75.9)	24.4 (75.9)	24.0 (75.2)	23.7 (74.7)	23.5 (74.3)	22.8 (73.0)	23.8 (74.9)
Record low °C (°F)	13.7 (56.7)	15.0 (59.0)	18.5 (65.3)	19.8 (67.6)	22.3 (72.1)	21.8 (71.2)	21.4 (70.5)	21.6 (70.9)	21.4 (70.5)	20.2 (68.4)	16.0 (60.8)	15.1 (59.2)	13.7 (56.7)
Average precipitation mm (inches)	41.1 (1.62)	19.8 (0.78)	77.6 (3.06)	154.2 (6.07)	485.9 (19.13)	638.0 (25.12)	706.3 (27.81)	771.5 (30.37)	678.8 (26.72)	421.3 (16.59)	130.1 (5.12)	58.5 (2.30)	4,183.1 (164.69)
Average precipitation days (≥ 1.0 mm)	3.1	2.4	5.4	10.2	20.4	21.6	23.0	23.8	22.8	19.2	10.5	5.3	167.7
Average relative humidity (%)	72.6	70.1	71.5	75.7	82.0	83.7	84.5	84.7	85.6	84.7	80.1	75.0	79.2
Mean monthly sunshine hours	232.5	214.7	201.5	183.0	155.0	114.0	114.7	114.7	108.0	145.7	174.0	195.3	1,953.1
Mean daily sunshine hours	7.5	7.6	6.5	6.1	5.0	3.8	3.7	3.7	3.6	4.7	5.8	6.3	5.4
Source 1: World Meteorological Organization
Source 2: Office of Water Management and Hydrology, Royal Irrigation Department (sun 1981–2010)(extremes)

== Transportation ==
Phet Kasem Road (Thailand Route 4) runs through the city. Ranong Airport is about 24 kilometres (15 mi) south of town.

The Port Authority of Thailand operates the Ranong Port, which is Thailand's principal Indian Ocean port. In 2008, the Ranong human-smuggling incident resulted in 54 deaths.

Several ferries are connecting to Kawthaung, Myanmar, which can be accessed by foreigners without visa. There also is a boat from Ranong to the Burmese resort island Thahtay Kyun.
