= Ranong province =

Coordinates: 9°58′01″N 98°38′08″E

Ranong ระนอง (Thai)
- Province

Other transcription(s)
  - Southern Thai: ระนอง (pronounced [ràʔ.nɔ̂ːŋ])
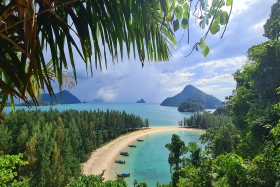
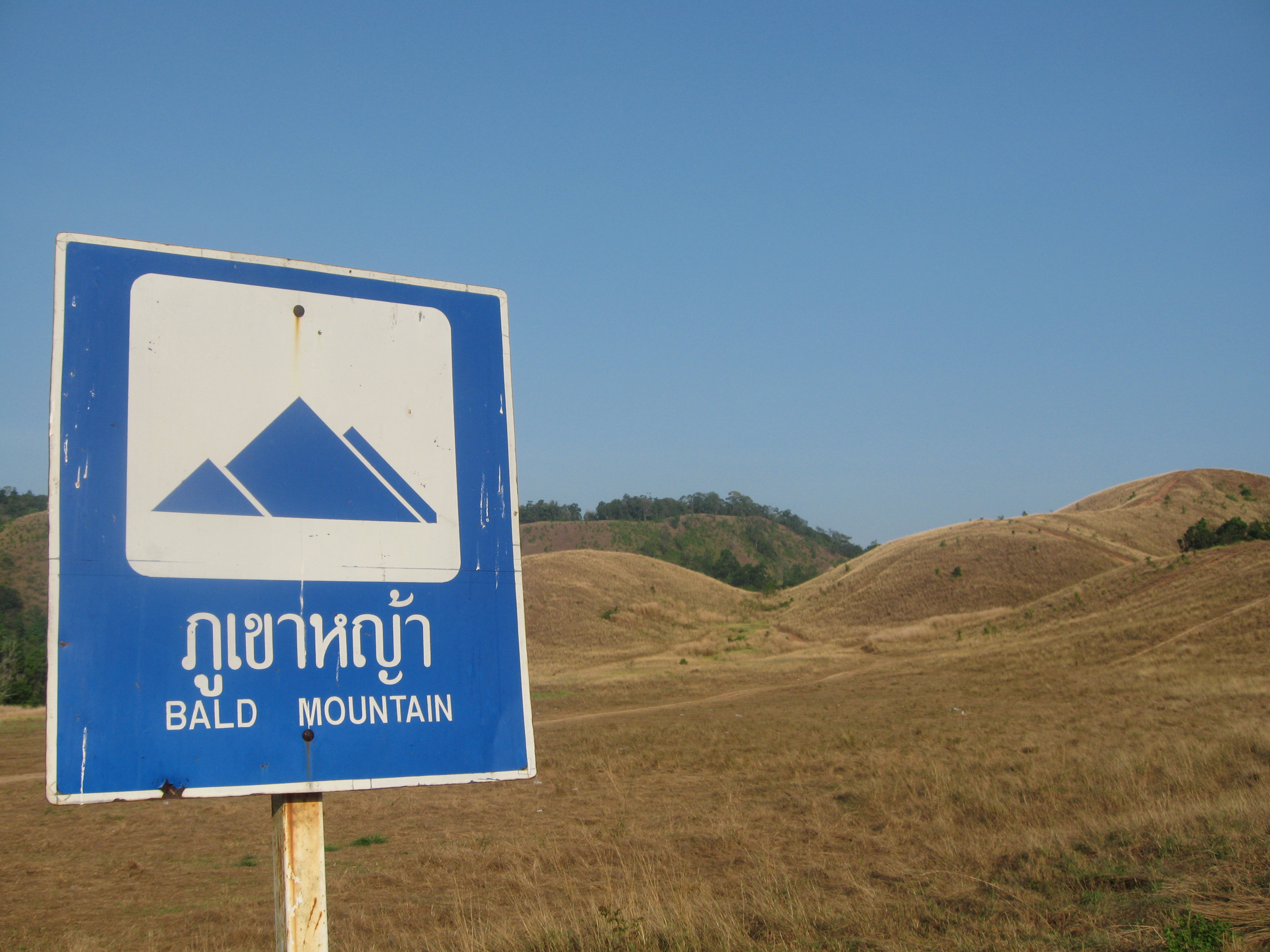
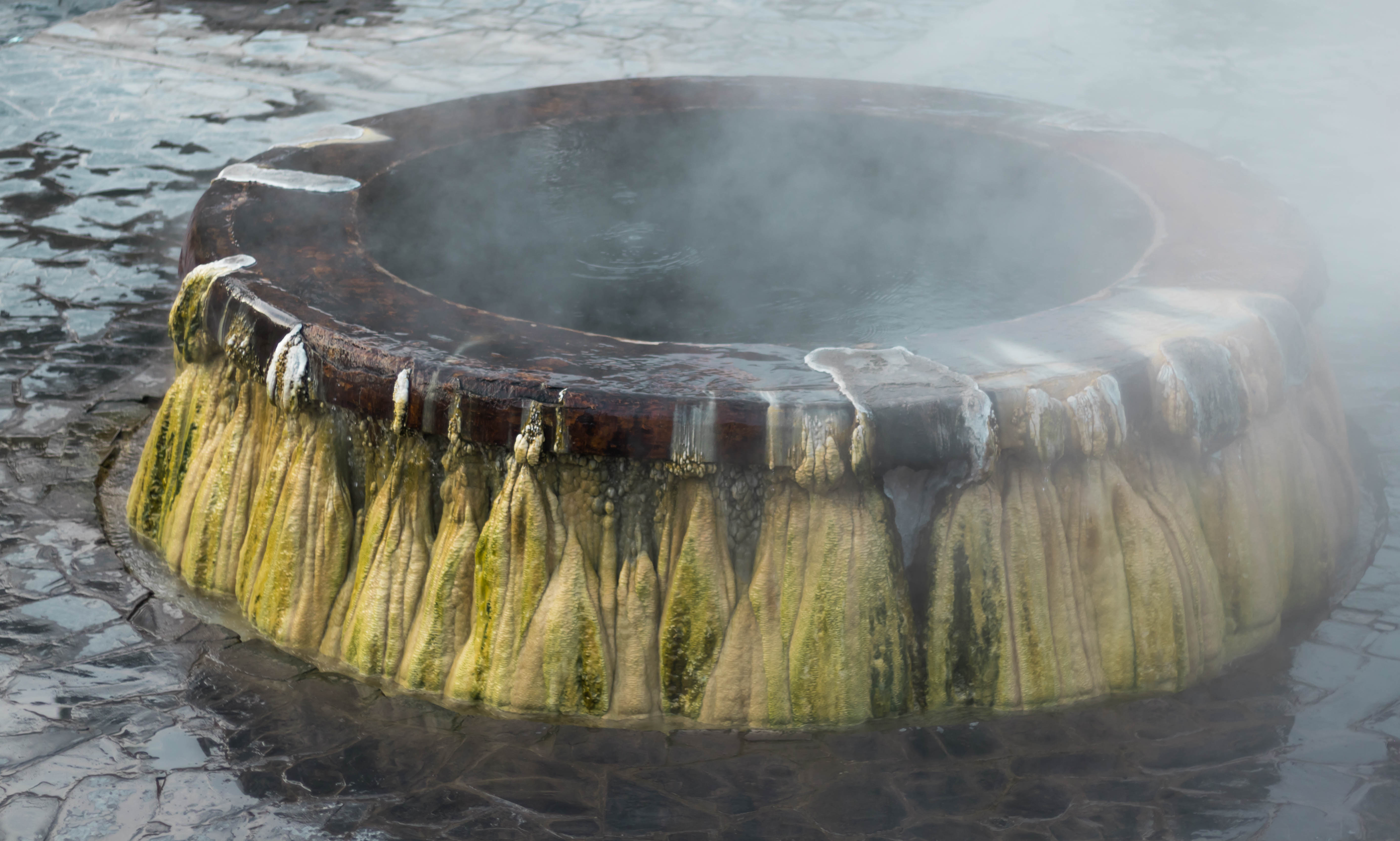
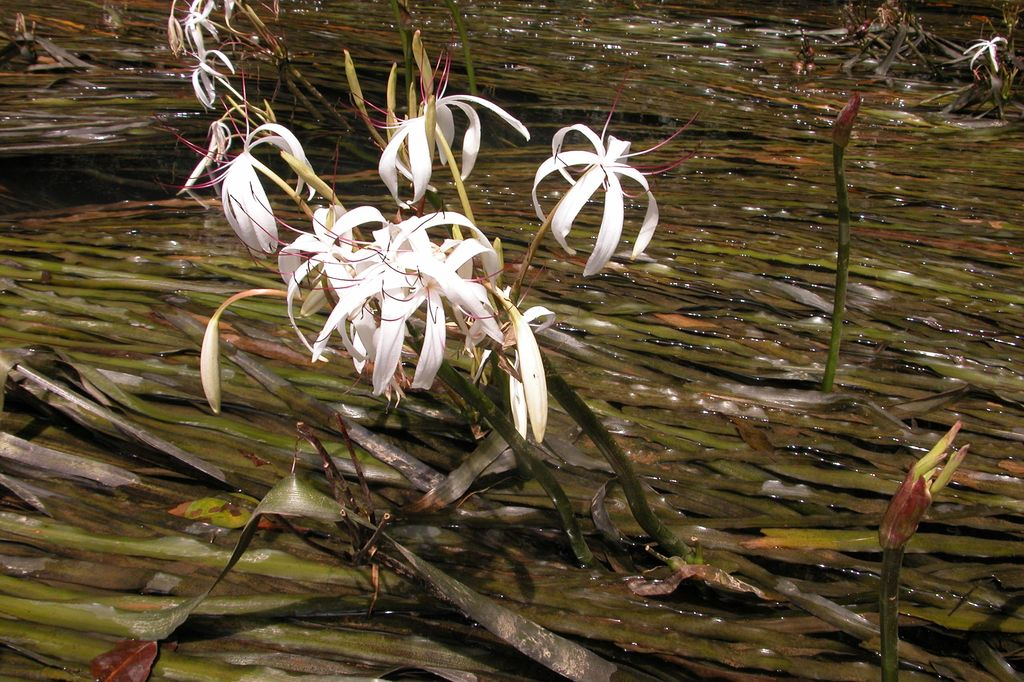
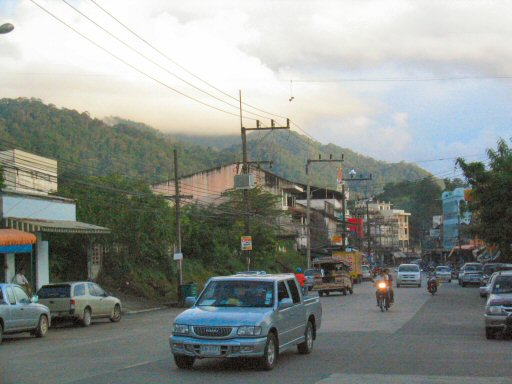
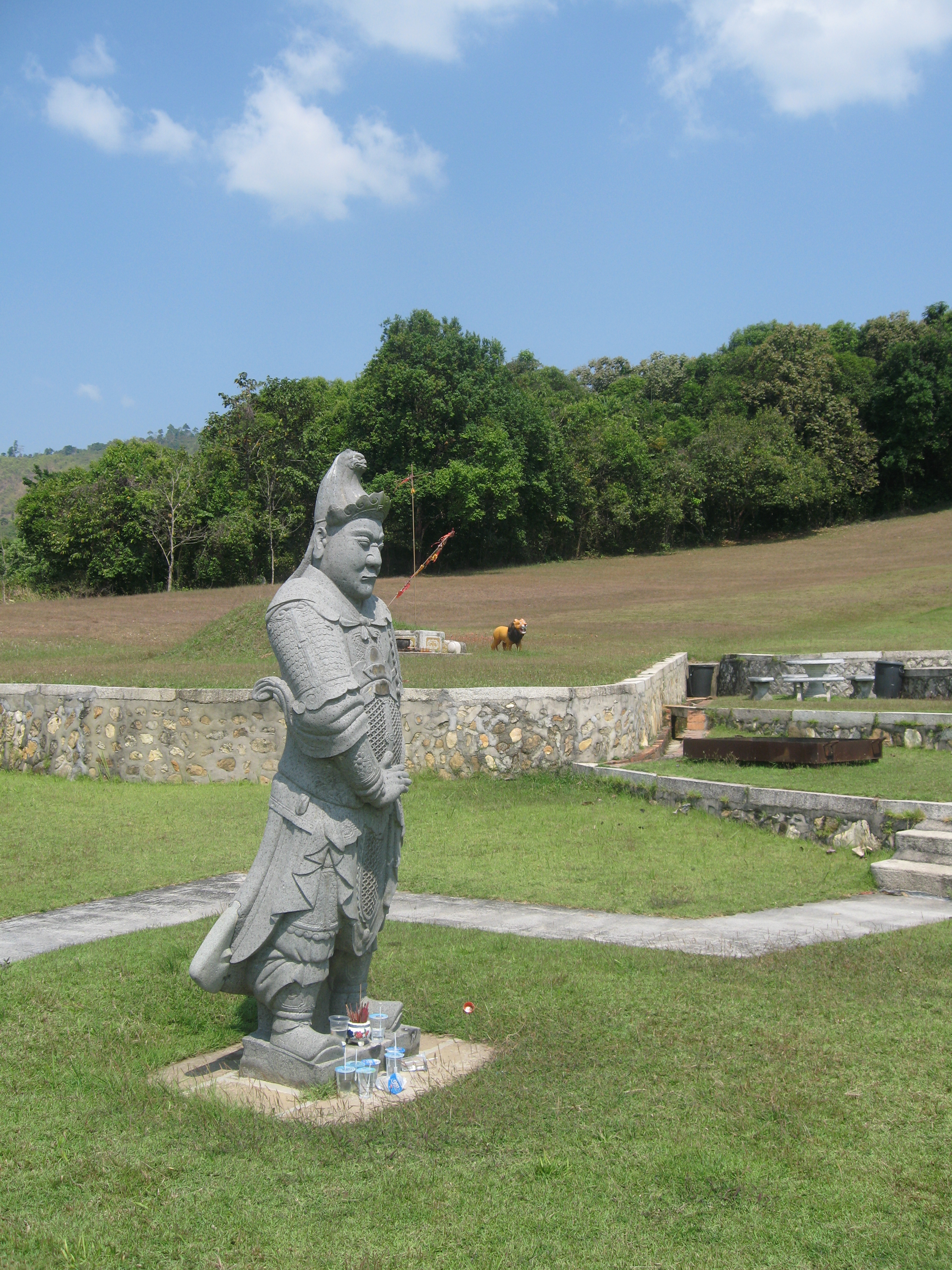
- From top: Kam Tok island, Phu Khao Ya, Raksawarin Hot Springs, Crinum thaianum also known locally as Hom nam, The province main street, Ranong Governor's Grave

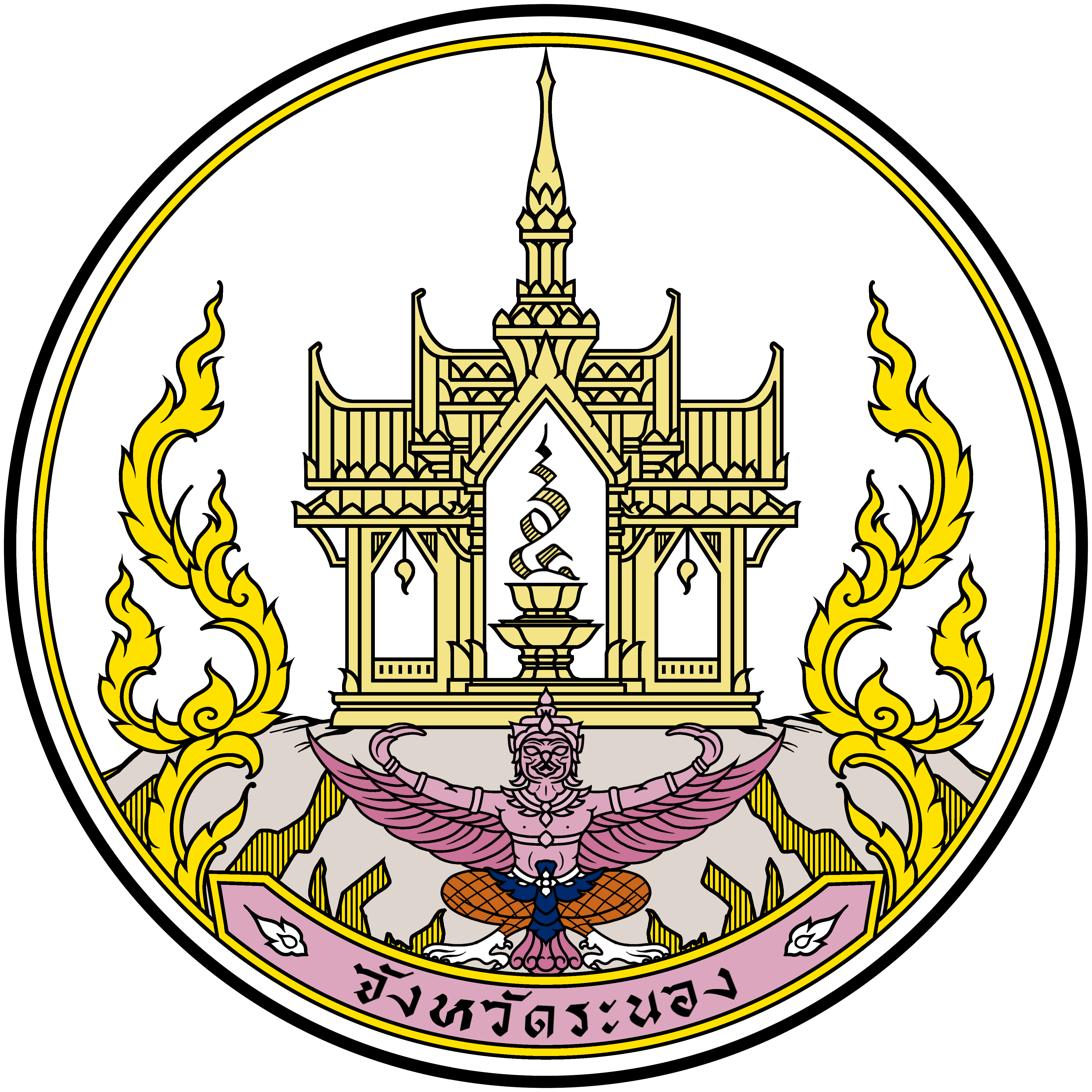
- Flag Seal
- Nickname: City of Eight Months of Rain, Four Months of Sunshine (Note: Thai: เมืองฝนแปดแดดสี่)
- Mottoes: "The Kra Isthmus. Grassy hills. Sweet cashews. Mineral streams. The true pearl, Ranong City." (Note: Thai: คอคอดกระ ภูเขาหญ้า กาหยูหวาน ธารน้ำแร่ มุกแท้เมืองระนอง)
- Map of Thailand highlighting Ranong province
- Country: Thailand
- Capital: Ranong

Government
  - Governor: Supoj Putikiatkhajon

Area
  - Total: 3,230 km^{2} (1,250 sq mi)
  - Rank: 61st

Population (2024)
  - Total: ▼192,927
  - Rank: 76th
  - Density: 60/km^{2} (160/sq mi)
  - Rank: 69th

Human Achievement Index
  - HAI (2022): 0.6291 "somewhat low" Ranked 56th

GDP
  - Total: baht 27 billion (US$0.9 billion) (2019)
- Time zone: UTC+7 (ICT)
- Postal code: 85xxx
- Calling code: 077
- ISO 3166 code: TH-85
- Website: ranong.go.th

Ranong Provincial Administrative Organization องค์การบริหารส่วนจังหวัดระนอง
- Provincial Administrative Organization
- Interactive map of Ranong Provincial Administrative Organization

Government
  - Type: Local administrative divisions
  - Body: Ranong Provincial Administrative Organization
  - President: Siharat Sapakul
- Website: ranongpao.go.th

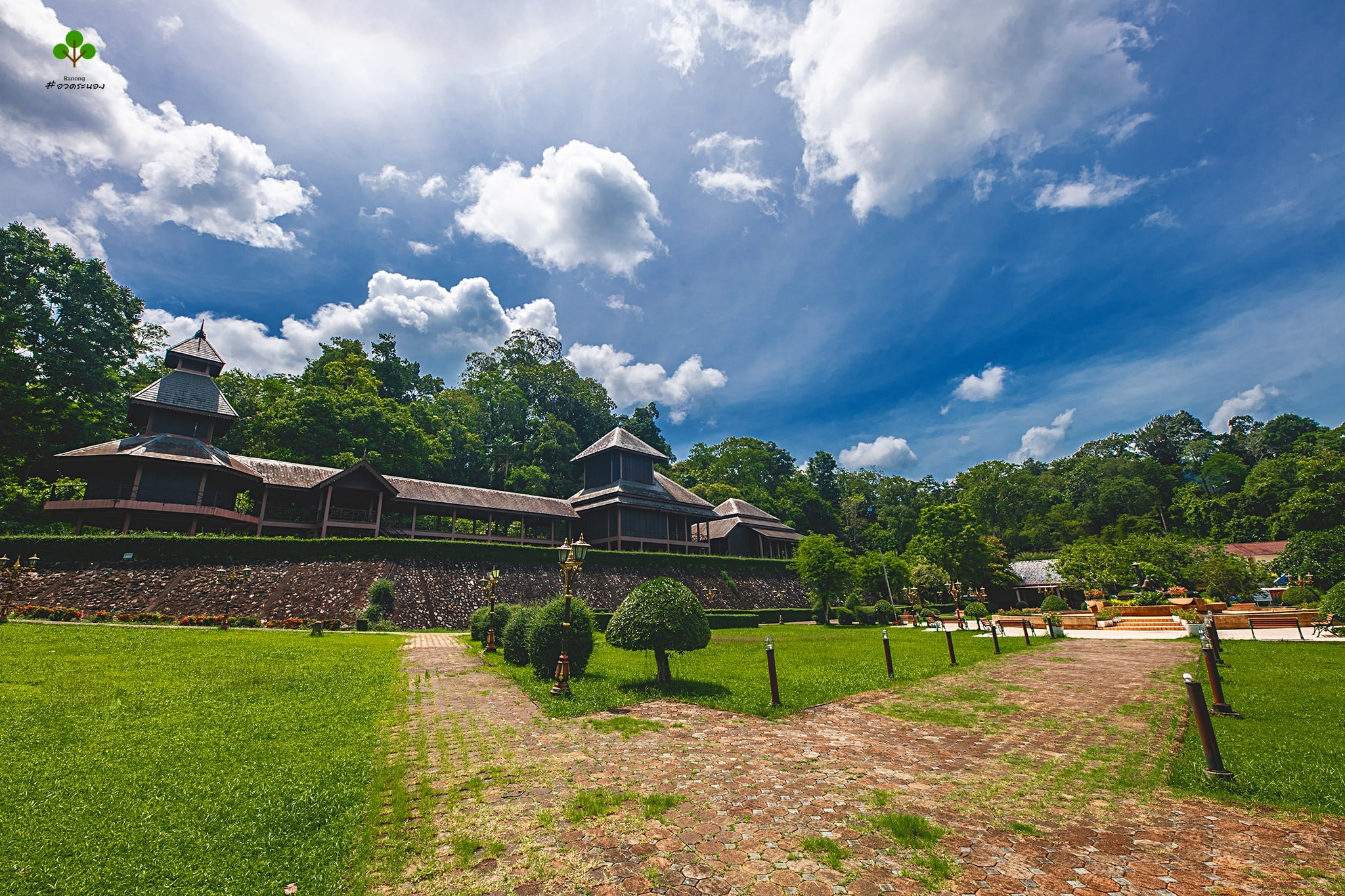
Rattanarangsan Palace (Ranong)

Ranong (Note: Thai: ระนอง [rá.nɔ̄ːŋ]; Malay: Rundung, روندوڠ) is one of Thailand's southern provinces (changwat), on the west coast along the Andaman Sea. It is the second-least populous province. Provinces neighboring Ranong are (clockwise) Chumphon, Surat Thani, and Phang Nga. To the west, it borders Kawthaung, Tanintharyi, Myanmar.

== Geography ==
Ranong is on the Kra Isthmus, a narrow strip of land, only 44 kilometres (27 mi) wide, that connects Thailand with the Malay Peninsula, on the west of the Phuket mountain range. It has a long coast on the Andaman Sea. The province, together with Trat province, is known for being one of the wettest places in Thailand, the rainy season lasting for about eight months.

Ranong is the least populated province. The total forest area is 1,726 km^{2} (666 sq mi) or 53.5 percent of provincial area, and 67 percent is mountainous. In former years the major industry was tin mining, but most mines are now exhausted. White clay mining (for the production of porcelain) and fishing are now the main industries, along with rubber and cashew nuts.

The Ngao Mangrove Forest Research Centre, also known as the Ranong Biosphere Reserve, in the north of Kapoe District, covering 189,431 rai (303.09 km^{2}), was declared in 1997. It is the fourth biosphere reserve of Thailand, and the only one on the seacoast protecting mangrove forests.

=== National parks ===
There are four national parks, along with seven other national parks, make up region 4 (Surat Thani) of Thailand's protected areas. (Visitors in fiscal year 2024)

Namtok Ngao National Park	668 km^{2} (258 sq mi)	(94,691)
Mu Ko Ranong National Park	357 km^{2} (138 sq mi)	(1,716)
Laem Son National Park	315 km^{2} (122 sq mi)	(21,911)
Lam Nam Kra Buri National Park	160 km^{2} (62 sq mi)	(34,135)

=== Wildlife sanctuaries ===
There are four wildlife sanctuaries, along with three other wildlife sanctuaries, make up region 4 (Surat Thani) of Thailand's protected areas.

Khlong Nakha Wildlife Sanctuary	530 km^{2} (200 sq mi)
Khuan Mae Yai Mon Wildlife Sanctuary	464 km^{2} (179 sq mi)
Thung Raya–Na Sak Wildlife Sanctuary	338 km^{2} (131 sq mi)
Prince Chumphon South Park Wildlife Sanctuary	315 km^{2} (122 sq mi)

Location protected areas of Ranong

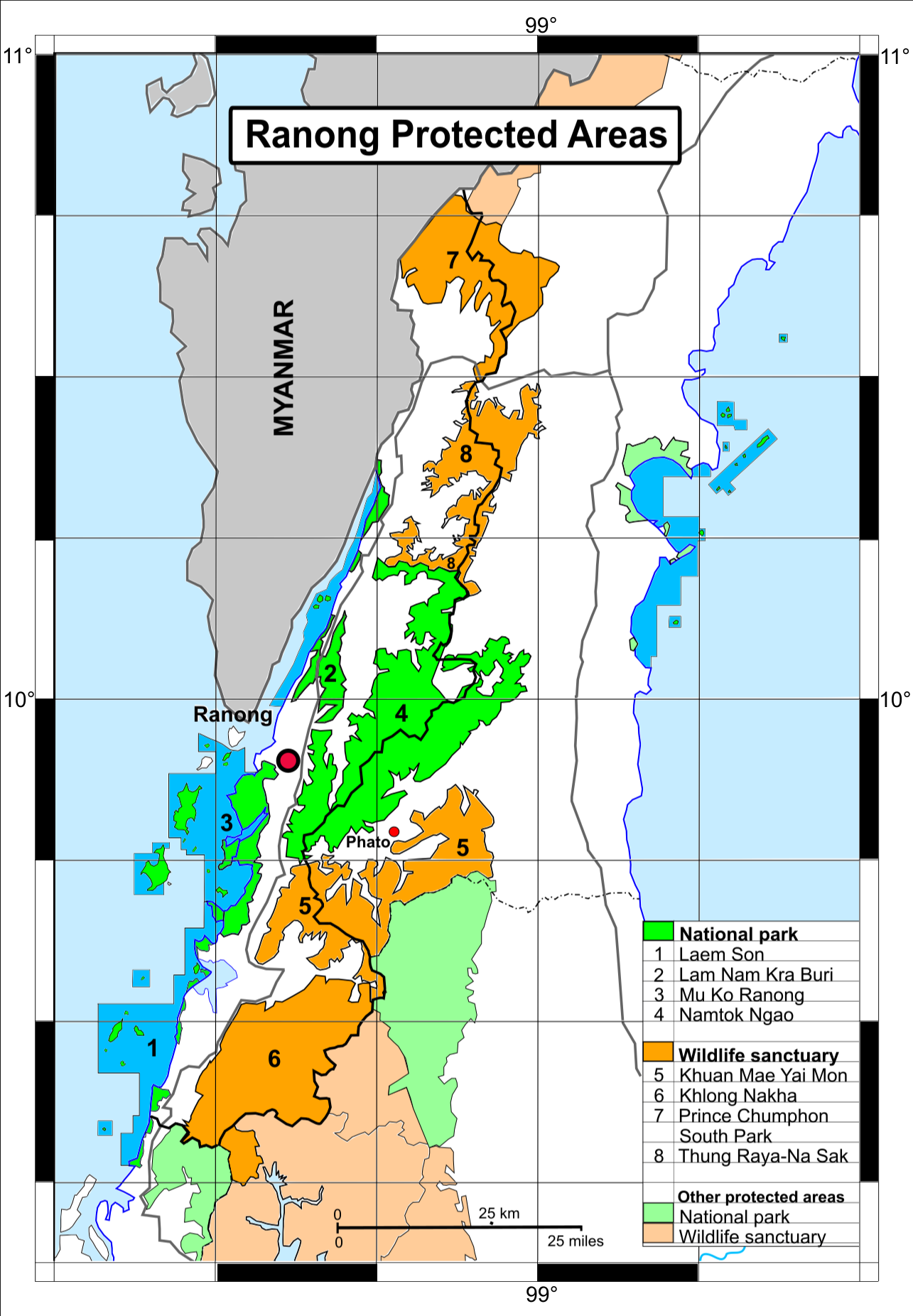
Ranong protected areas

	National park
1	Laem Son
2	Lam Nam Kra Buri
3	Mu Ko Ranong
4	Namtok Ngao

	Wildlife sanctuary
5	Khuan Mae Yai Mon
6	Khlong Nakha
7	Prince Chumphon South Park
8	Thung Raya-Na Sak

== History ==
Two Iron Age settlements on the western side of the Kra Isthmus, Phu Khao Thong and Bang Kluai Nok, were centres of the same kind as Khao Sam Kaeo on the eastern side. Bérénice Bellina and her colleagues have read the two sides together as port polities of the kind Malacca, Banten and Pasai became later. Sing C. Chew reports the assemblages of Phu Khao Thong, of about the third to the first centuries BC, as closely comparable to those of Khao Sam Kaeo. Indian fine wares and steatite containers have been found there, and Brigitte Borell takes the Roman-style intaglios, pendants and glassware from the site as evidence of trade reaching further west than South Asia. Laure Dussubieux and Bernard Gratuze report that about half of all the mineral soda-calcium-alumina, or Arika, glass they have analysed from Southeast Asia comes from Phu Khao Thong, though they describe those results as unpublished. The same type accounts for about thirty per cent of their South Indian samples, most of them from Arikamedu, and is rare in Sri Lanka; where it was made they leave open. In their three-period scheme they group Phu Khao Thong with the early rather than the very early sites, unlike Khao Sam Kaeo. Rice remains point the other way for the earlier period: neither western site has yielded the japonica subspecies in its Bronze Age levels, and indica appears in Southeast Asia only in the first centuries of the historic period.

Ranong province once was a deputy town of Chumphon in the Ayutthaya era (1350–1767). It was a small, mountainous town that protected Chumphon from Burma. The population was very low until the discovery of tin, when people from many cities and foreigners started to visit Ranong to do tin business there. This also gave rise to the name Ranong, which was a distorted form of rae nong (แร่นอง), meaning "full of minerals". The ruler of Ranong was known after the town as Luang Ranong (Thai: หลวงระนอง)

At the start of the Rattanakosin era (1781–present), a wealthy Chinese merchant, Kho Su Jiang bought a majority share of the tin business in Ranong and was appointed tax collector of the region, with the title Luang Rattana Setti (Thai: หลวงรัตนเศรษฐี), by King Nangklao (Rama III). In 1854, the Luang Ranong died. King Mongkut (Rama IV) then promoted Kho Su Jiang to the position, promoting him to Phra Rattana Setti (Thai: พระรัตนเศรษฐี). By then, Ranong's wealth had increased greatly and through taxation was a significant source of income for the capital, thus in 1877 King Chulalongkorn (Rama V) elevated Ranong to provincial status, answering directly to Bangkok as opposed to Chumphon, with Phra Rattana Setti becoming its first governor.

After the First Anglo-Burmese War, when the British assumed control of Tenasserim and the Kraburi River became the demarcation line between Siam and British-controlled Burma, Ranong became an important border city where goods were exchanged, a status that it still holds today.

Being located on the Kra Isthmus, the narrowest part (44 kilometres) of the Malay Peninsula, a proposal of a canal through the area has been long suggested, particularly by the French. If successful, traveling from Europe to China would be faster through this route instead of circumnavigating the Malay Peninsula. This was seen as a threat to the financial growth of the harbors of Singapore and Penang, which at the time were owned by Britain, who therefore forced the suspension of the project. At the end of World War II, Thailand signed a British-imposed treaty called "The Termination of The State of War Between Siam and Allies", which forbade Thailand from digging such a canal without British permission. This treaty was revoked in 1954. Since then, plans for the canal have continued to be suggested and discussed, even in the present day, though Prime Minister Prayut Chan-o-cha said in 2018 that it was not a government priority.

Ranong has also been historically significant as a residence for royal tours of the southern provinces, with many kings of Thailand visiting Ranong in the past. The first was King Chulalongkorn, who stayed at Rattana Ransan palace for three nights in 1890. The palace is now a landmark in Ranong. King Prajadhipok (Rama VII) visited in 1928, and King Bhumibol (Rama IX) and Queen Sirikit visited in 1959.

== Climate ==
Most of Thailand receives from 1,200 to 1,600 mm of precipitation per year. Two provinces, Ranong and Trat, receive more than 4,500 mm a year making them the wettest places in the country.

For this reason, Ranong is called "Mueang Fon Paet Daet Si" (เมืองฝนแปดแดดสี่, pronounced [mɯːaŋ fǒn pɛ̀ːt dɛ̀ːt sìː], lit. 'the city of eight months of rain and four months of sunshine'), meaning it rains for eight months of the year, and only four months are without rain.

== Symbols ==
The provincial seal shows a castle on top of a hill, as an aide memoire that King Chulalongkorn (Rama V) once visited Ranong and stayed at the Ratana Rangsan Castle on top of the Niveskiri Hill. The number five refers to King Rama V; the castle is Ratana Rangsan Palace; the mountain is Niveshkiri; the royal tray refers to the people of Ranong.

The provincial slogan is, "Kra Isthmus, mountain grass, cashew nut, mineral water stream, and real pearl of Ranong."

The provincial flower is the orchid species Dendrobium formosum and the provincial tree is Lagerstroemia speciosa. The endemic terrestrial crab Phricotelphusa sirindhorn is the provincial aquatic species.

== Administrative divisions ==
=== Central government ===
Map with five districts

Ranong is divided into five districts (amphoe). These are further divided into 30 subdistricts (tambon) and 178 villages (muban).

No.	District	Thai	Malay	Pop.	subdistricts	Villages
1.	Mueang Ranong	เมืองระนอง	Bandar Raya Rundung	93,271	9	38
2.	La-un	ละอุ่น	Pak Un	15,240	7	30
3.	Kapoe	กะเปอร์	Kapur	22,093	5	34
4.	Kra Buri	กระบุรี	Segenting Kera	48,163	7	61
5.	Suk Samran	สุขสำราญ	-	14,594	2	15
		-	Total	193,371	30	178

=== Local government ===
As of December 2023 there are: one Ranong provincial administrative organization - PAO (ongkan borihan suan changwat - o bo cho) and 12 municipal areas (thesaban) in the province. Ranong and Bang Rin have town (thesaban mueang) status. Further 10 subdistrict municipalities (thesaban tambon).

Town municipality	Pop.	website
Bang Rin	22,7830	bangrin.go.th
Ranong	17,779	ranongcity.go.th

Subdistrict municipality	Pop.	website
Bang Non	14,443	bangnoncity.go.th
Choporo	12,950	jpr.go.th
Ratchakrut	9,766	ratchakrudcity.go.th
Pak Nam Tha Ruea	8,071	paknamtarua.go.th
Kamphuan	7,029	kumpuan.go.th
Nam Chuet	3,503	namchuet.go.th
La-un	2,629	tesabanlaun.go.th
Ngao	2,399	ngaotown-ranong.go.th
Pak Nam	2,385	
Kapoe	1,485	kapercity.go.th

The non-municipal areas are administered by 19 subdistrict administrative organisations - SAO (ongkan borihan suan tambon).

== Healthcare ==
=== Hospitals ===
There are five hospitals in the province:

- Ranong hospital with 300 beds.
- Kapoe hospital with 35 beds.
- Kra Buri hospital with 30 beds.
- La-un hospital with 16 beds.
- Suk Samran hospital with 10 beds.

=== Health promoting hospitals ===
There are total forty five health-promoting hospitals, of which:

- 16 in Mueang Ranong district
- 8 in La-un district
- 6 in Kapoe district
- 11 in Kra Buri district
- 4 in Suk Samran district

== Demographics ==
=== Population ===
Population history of Ranong province is as follows:

1947	1960	1970	1980	1990	2000	2011	2020
21,488	38,000	59,000	83,707	117,440	161,210	183,849	194,372

== Religion ==
There are forty five Theravada Buddhist temples in the province.

- 16 in Mueang Ranong district
- 9 in La-un district
- 6 in Kapoe district
- 12 in Kra Buri district
- 2 in Suk Samran district

== Transportation ==
Phet Kasem Road (Thailand Route 4) runs through the province. Ranong Airport is about 24 kilometres (15 mi) south of Ranong.

The Port Authority of Thailand operates the Ranong Port, which is Thailand's principal Indian Ocean port. In 2008, the Ranong human-smuggling incident resulted in 54 deaths.

== Human achievement index 2022 ==
Health	Education	Employment	Income
20	67	31	33
Housing	Family	Transport	Participation
63	10	50	64
Province Ranong, with an HAI 2022 value of 0.6291 is "somewhat low", occupies place 56 in the ranking.

Since 2003, United Nations Development Programme (UNDP) in Thailand has tracked progress on human development at sub-national level using the Human achievement index (HAI), a composite index covering all the eight key areas of human development. National Economic and Social Development Board (NESDB) has taken over this task since 2017.

Rank	Classification
1–13	High
14–29	Somewhat high
30–45	Average
46–61	Somewhat low
62–77	Low

Map with provinces and HAI 2022 rankings

== Tourism ==
Namtok Ngao National Park (อุทยานแห่งชาติน้ำตกหงาว) Covering a total area of approximately 417,500 rai (668 km^{2}) it was declared a national park on 3 June 1999.

Ko Chang (Ranong) (เกาะช้าง) island in tambon Ko Phayam. With an area of 18 square kilometres and 80 homes on the entire island. Cashew and para rubber plantations as well as coastal fisheries are the main industries.

Laem Son National Park (อุทยานแห่งชาติแหลมสน) It covers a total area of 196,875 rai (31.5 hectares). It also includes islands in the Andaman Sea; namely, Ko Khangkhao and Mu Ko Kam. Places of interest within the national park include:

- Hat Bang Ben (หาดบางเบน) is a long sandy beach shaded by pine trees where the national park headquarters is located.
- Hat Laem Son (หาดแหลมสน) is a white sandy beach approximately four kilometres next to Hat Bang Ben.
- Hat Praphat or Hat Hin Thung (หาดประพาส หรือ หาดหินทุ่ง) Similar to Hat Bang Ben, Hat Praphat is a large beach shaded by pine trees.
- Ko Khangkhao (เกาะค้างคาว) is an island with fine sandy beaches and a gravel beach known as Hat Hin Ngam in the north.
- Ko Kam Yai (เกาะกำใหญ่) is a scenic island with white sandy beaches.
- Ko Kam Nui (เกาะกำนุ้ย) is not far from Ko Kam Yai with beaches on one side and many other nearby islets.

Raksawarin Hot Springs and Public Park (บ่อน้ำพุร้อนรักษะวาริน) The most famous and popular hot spring of Ranong. It have been analysed by the Department of Science Service to contain important minerals, and it is the only source in Thailand that does not contain any sulphur additives. It is possible to drink from the source, and it is also regarded as pure water. The hot springs and public park is in Ranong town.

Phu Khao Ya (ภูเขาหญ้า) The bald mountain with grass growing all over the mountain, it is extraordinary in that it is a geographical anomaly. This average-sized hill is entirely void of trees leaving it looking, as local residents say, like a "Swiss pasture". Phu Khao Ya can also change color according to the season and time of day. It is situated 12 kilometres (7.4 mi) to the south of Ranong town.

Khlong Naka (คลองนาคา) This wildlife sanctuary is the only home for the aquatic plant Crinum thaianum. This species of plant is endemic to the local stream, and from October till November is when the flowers bloom at their most.

Wat Hat Som Paen (วัดหาดส้มแป้น) The local Ranong Buddhist temple. Its highlight, besides worshiping the Buddha, is also admiring the beauty of the stream that flows through the temple, which is also home to a large number of the rock mahseer.

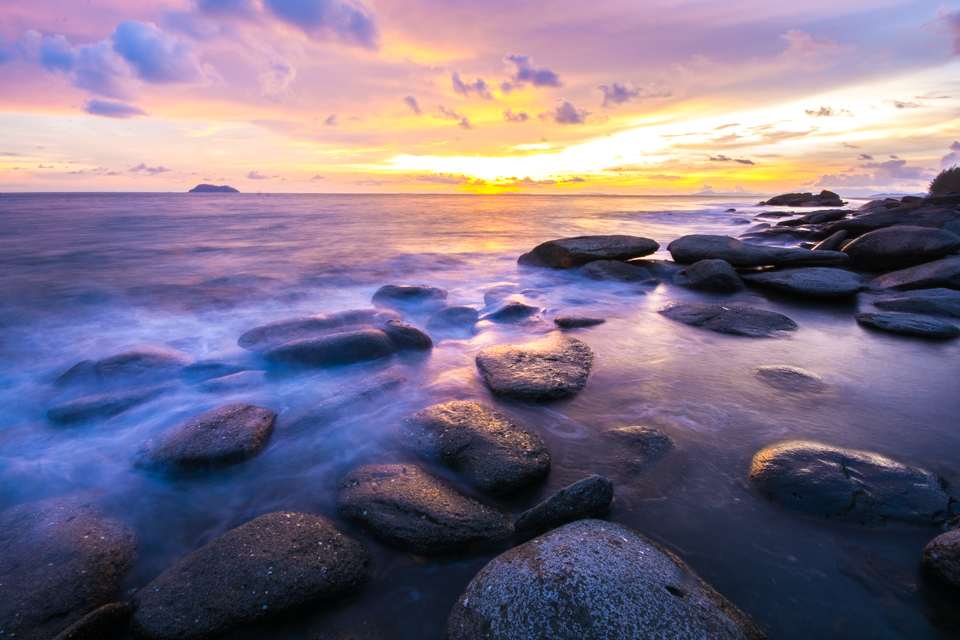
Laem Son National Park

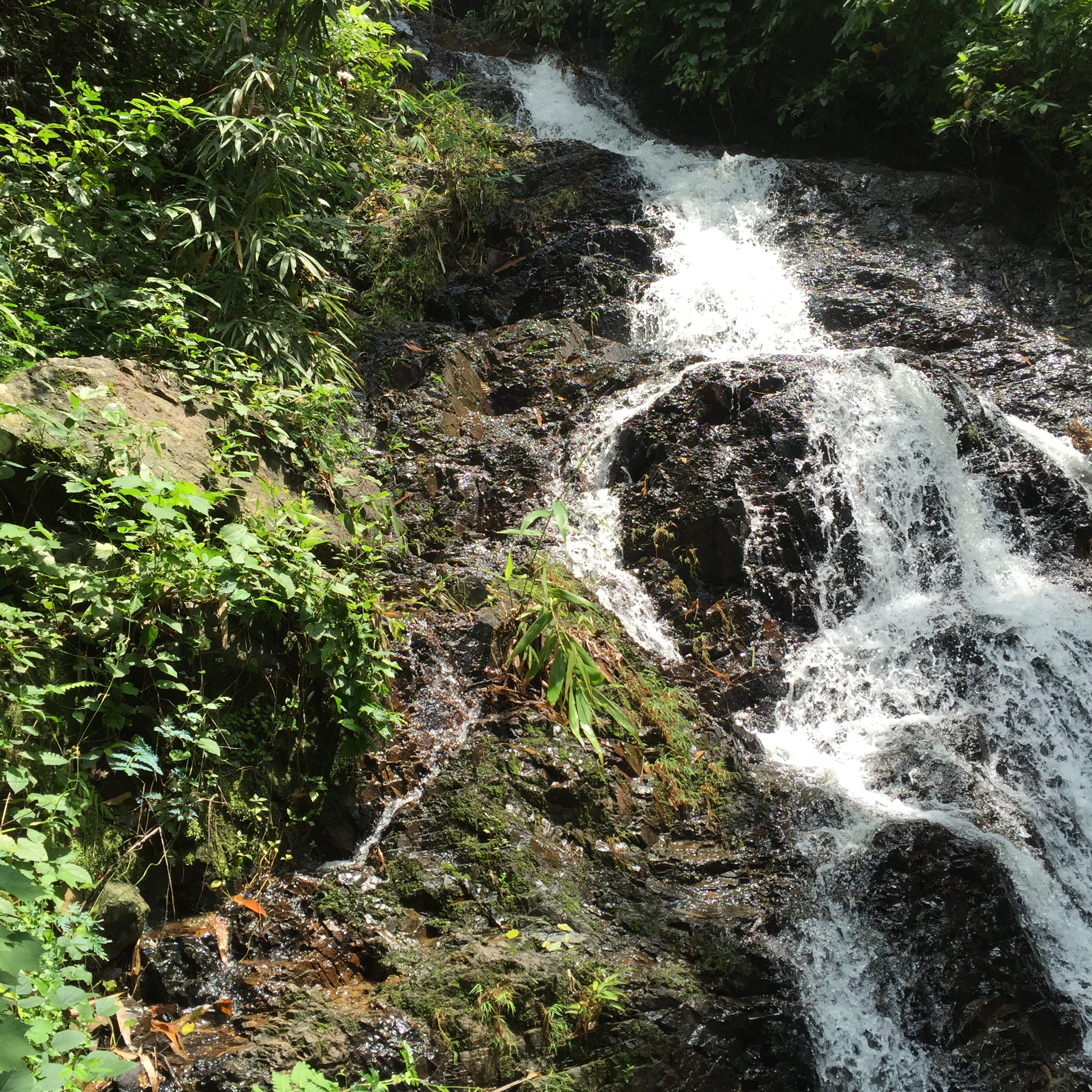
Namtok Chum Saeng, Kra Buri District

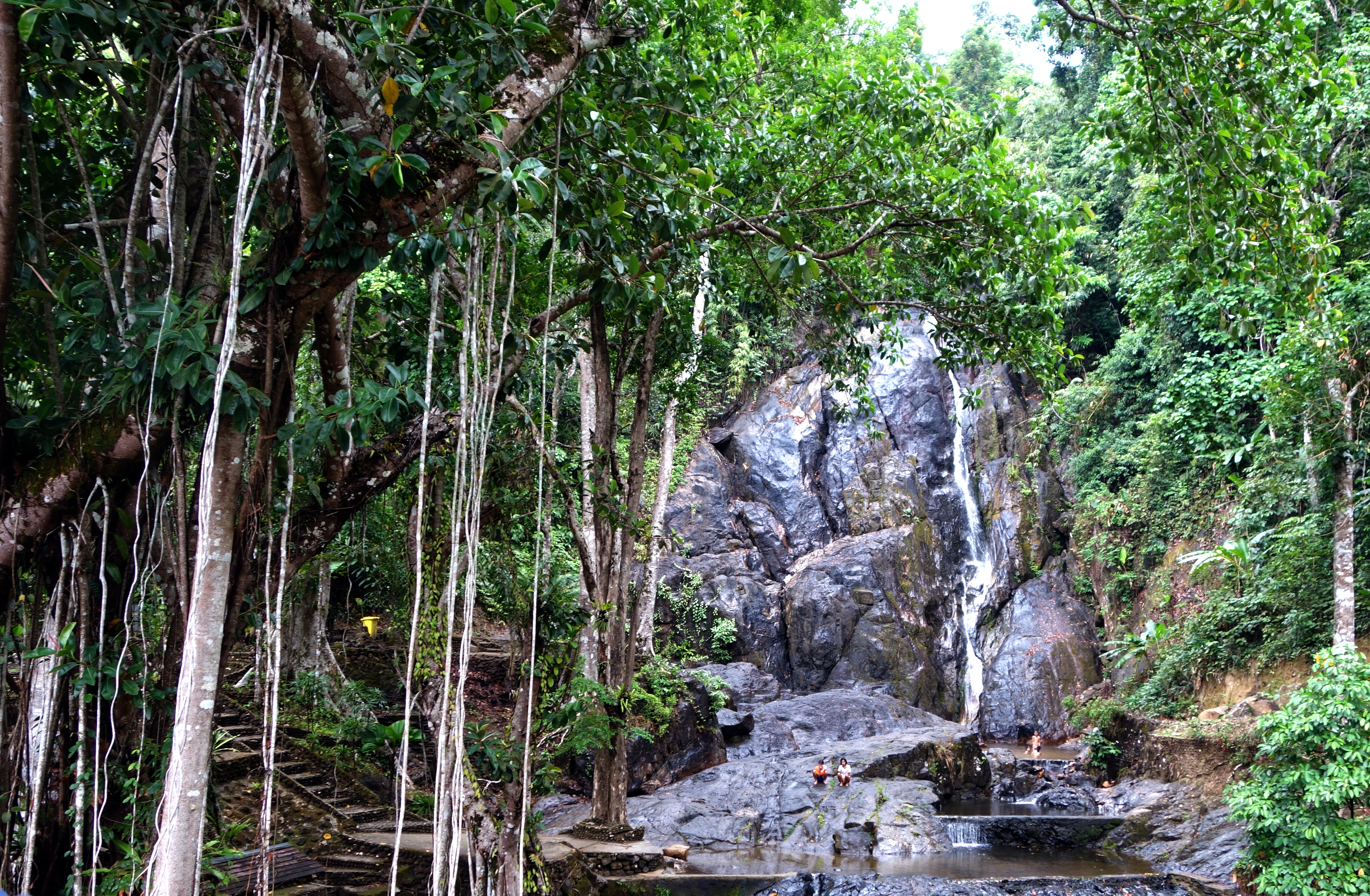
Namtok Punyaban, Mueang Ranong District

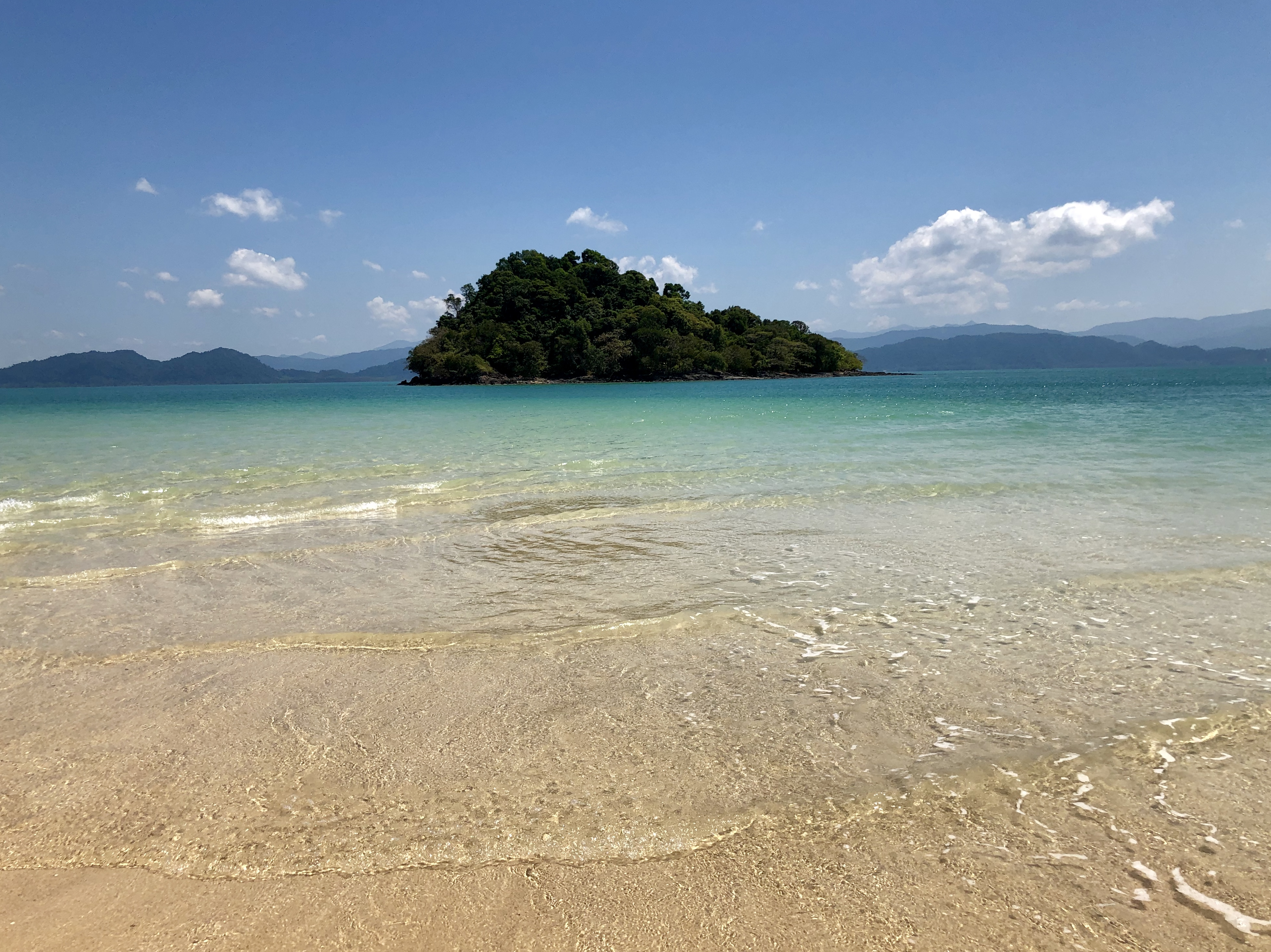
Ko Phayam

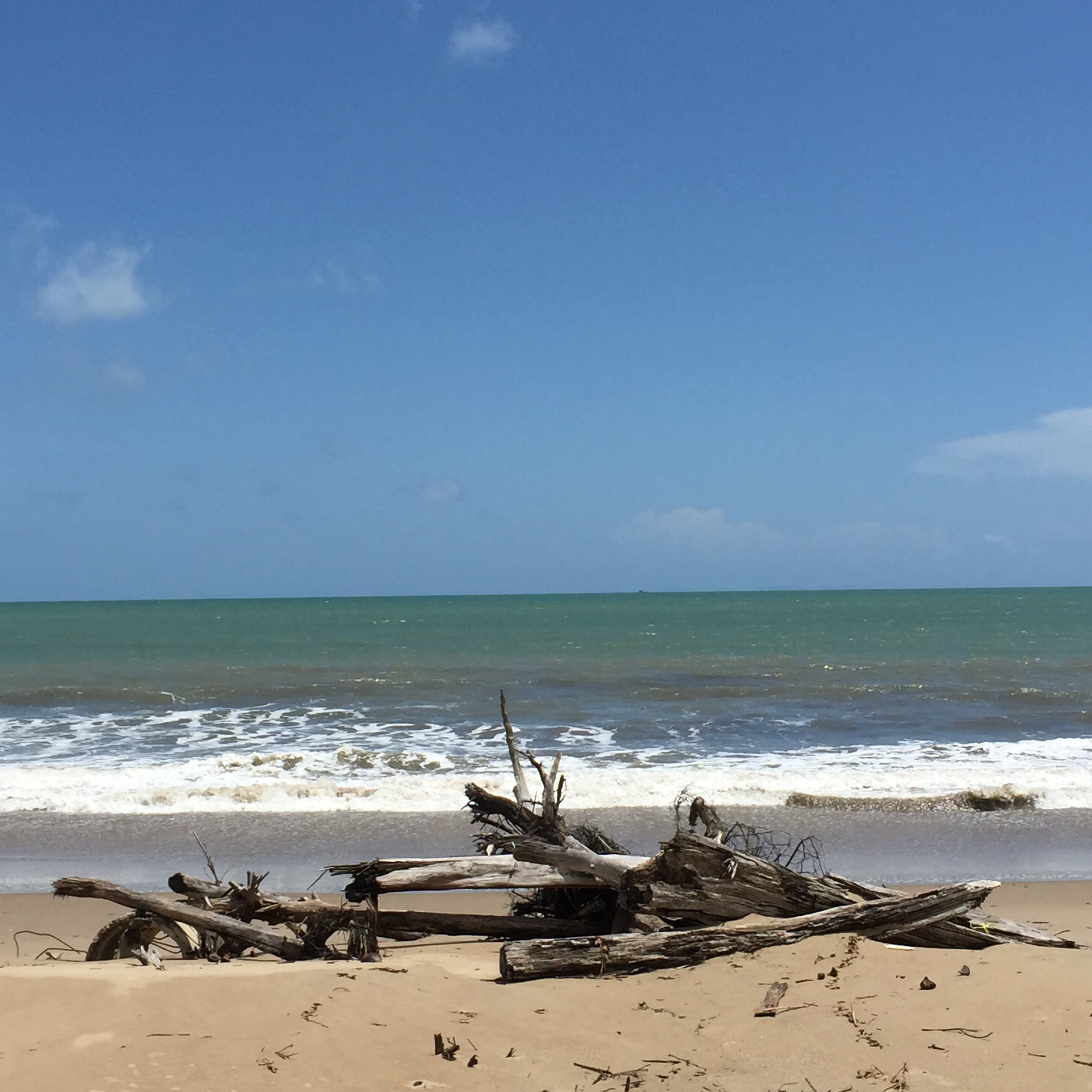
Kamphuan, Suk Samran District
