= List of massacres in Thailand =

The following is a list of massacres and shooting incidents that have occurred in Thailand:

== Before 2000 ==
Name	Attack types	Date	Location	Province	Deaths	Injured	Total	Notes
Martyrs of Songkhon	Shooting	16 December 1940	Songkhon village, Wan Yai District	Mukdahan	7	0	7	
Dusun Nyor Rebellion	Various	28 April 1948	Chanae district	Narathiwat	430	0	430	
Murders of the 4 ex-ministers	Shooting	4 March 1949	Chatuchak district	Bangkok	4	0	4	
Manhattan Rebellion	Various	29 June 1951	HTMS Sri Ayudhya, Chao Phraya River, Memorial Bridge, and the nearby area	Bangkok	128 (118 civilian bystanders)	500+	600+	
Red Drum killings	Various	1972	Tambon Lam Sai	Phatthalung	200–3,000	0	200–3,000	
1972 Wat Sra Bua temple fairs grenade attack	Bombing	8 May 1972	Wat Sra Bua, Mukdahan district	Nakhon Phanom	9	13	22	
1973 Thai student uprising	Various	14 October 1973	City-wide; mainly at the Ratchawithi Road outside the Chitralada Palace, Thammasat University, Sanam Luang and neighbourhoods surrounding the Ratchadamnoen Avenue	Bangkok	77	857	934	
Phlapphla Chai intersection riot	Unknown	4 July 1974	Phlapphla Chai intersection, Pom Prap Sattru Phai district	Bangkok	27	120	147	
Assassinations of activists from the Farmers Federation of Thailand (FFT)	Shooting	1974–1975	Nationwide	Nationwide	21	0	21	
Student bombing bangkok	Bombing	12 June 1975	National Library of Thailand	Bangkok	2		2	
Massacre at Phang Nga city hall	Bombing	1 October 1975	Phang Nga city hall, Thai Chang Sub-district Mueang Phang Nga district	Phang Nga	15	17	32	
Massacre at Pattani city hall	Bombing	13 December 1975	Pattani city hall, Mueang Pattani district	Pattani	12	30+	42+	
Bombing at the protest against the US military base	Bombing	21 March 1976	Political protest against the US military base, near Siam Theater, near Ratchaprasong intersection, Pathum Wan district	Bangkok	4	70	74	
Bombing at political rally at Chai Nat	Bombing	24 March 1976	Political rally at Nong Chik temple, Wat Sing district	Chai Nat	18	10	28	
Bombing at student congregation at Khon Kaen train station	Bombing	12 June 1976	Khon Kaen train station, Mueang Khon Kaen district	Khon Kaen	2	70	72	
Phraramhok Technological College Bombing	Bombing	3 March 1976	Bang O, Bangkok Bang Phlat district	Bangkok	3	2	5	
Mubankru Technological College Massacre	Bombing	21 September 1976	Nong Khang Phlu Nong Khaem district	Bangkok	5	60	65	
Thammasat University massacre	Various	6 October 1976	City-wide; mainly at Thammasat University and Sanam Luang	Bangkok	45	167+	212+	
Rajadamnern Stadium Bombing	Bombing	22 October 1980	Rajadamnern Stadium	Bangkok	2	5	7	
Lumpinee Boxing Stadium Bombing	Bombing	2 April 1982	Lumpinee Boxing Stadium	Bangkok	5	50	55	
Nakhon si Thammarat Shooting	Shooting	19 June 1984	Tha Sala district	Nakhon Si Thammarat province	9	0	9	
Klaew Thanikhul and Sakulyut Thongsaitharn Shooting	Shooting	5 April 1991	Sam Phran district	Nakhon Pathom province	2	0	2	
Black May	Shooting	17 May 1992	City-wide; mainly at the Ratchadamnoen Avenue	Bangkok	52	696	748	
Bus Bombing at Phasi Charoen Bus Station	Bombing	23 December 1992	Pak Khlong Phasi Charoen Phasi Charoen district	Bangkok	5	2	7	

== 2000-2009 ==
Name	Attack types	Date	Location	Province	Deaths	Injured	Total	Notes
Wat Tha Phra Shooting	Various	20 December 2001	Wat Tha Phra subdistrict	Bangkok	1	20	21	
Ban Kha school bus shooting	Shooting	4 June 2002	Ban Kha Sub-districts Ban Kha district	Ratchaburi	3	12	15	
Pak Phanang school shooting	Shooting	6 June 2003	Pak Phanang school, Pak Phanang district	Nakhon Si Thammarat province	2	4	6	
Krue Se Mosque Massacre	Shooting	28 April 2004	Krue Se Mosque Mueang Pattani district	Pattani	34		34	
Saba Yoi Massacre	Shooting	28 April 2004	Saba Yoi Sub-district Saba Yoi district	Songkhla	19		19	
Krong Pinang Massacre	Shooting	28 April 2004	Krong Pinang district	Yala	17	1	18	
Mae Lan Police Massacre	Shooting	28 April 2004	Mae lan Police Station Mae Lan district	Pattani	13	5	18	
Mueang Yala Massacre	Shooting	28 April 2004	Lidon Sub-district Mueang Yala district	Yala	10	3	13	
Mueang Yala Massacre	Shooting	28 April 2004	Ta se Sub-district Mueang Yala district	Yala	3	1	4	
Bannang Sata Massacre	Shooting	28 April 2004	Bacho Sub-district Bannang Sata district	Yala	8	4	12	
Ban Rae Massacre	Shooting	28 April 2004	Ban Rae Sub-district Than To district	Yala	5	1	6	
Nong Chik Massacre	Shooting	28 April 2004	Tha Kamcham Sub-district Nong Chik district	Pattani	2	2	4	
Tak Bai Incident	Various	25 October 2004	Tak Bai district	Narathiwat	85		85	
2005 Songkhla bombings	Bombing	3 April 2005	Hat Yai International Airport Mueang Songkhla district Hat Yai district	Songkhla	2	66	68	
2005 Ra-ngae Shooting	Shooting	16 November 2005	Bo-ngo Sub-district Ra-ngae district	Narathiwat	9		9	
2006 Hat Yai bombings	Bombing	16 September 2006	Hat Yai Hat Yai district	Songkhla	5	82	87	
2006 Bangkok bombings	Bombing	31 December 2006	9 locations across Bangkok metropolitan area, notable place such as Victory Monument	Bangkok, Nonthaburi	3	38	41	
2007 South Thailand bombings	Bombing	18 February 2007	Several provinces in Southern Thailand including Narathiwat, Pattani, Songkhla and Yala	Narathiwat, Pattani, Songkhla, Yala	7	43+	50+	
2007 Ra-ngae Bombing	Bombing	9 May 2007	Bo-ngo Sub-district Ra-ngae district	Narathiwat	7			
Talaad Thai Shooting	Shooting and Stabbing	23 May 2007	Khlong Luang district Talaad Thai	Pathum Thani	5	7	12	
2007 Songkhla bombings	Bombing	27 May 2007	Hat Yai district	Songkhla	4	36	40	
2007 Tano Pute Bombings	Bombing	31 May 2007	Tano Pute Bannang Sata district	Yala	12		12	
2007 Bannang Sata Bombings	Bombing	15 June 2007	Bannang Sata district	Yala	7		7	
2007 Pattani Bombings	Bombing	4 December 2007	Fern Restaurant Mueang Pattani district	Pattani	7	30	37	
2008 Chanae bombing	Bombing	14 January 2008	Chanae district	Narathiwat	8		8	
2008 Hat Yai Shootings	Shooting	1 March 2008	Kho Hong Sub Districts Hat Yai district	Songkhla	8		8	
2008 Chanae Bombing	bombing	5 December 2008	Dusongyo Sub-districts Chanae district	Narathiwat	5	12	17	
2009 Khlong Kum Shooting	Shooting	4 April 2009	Khlong Kum subdistrict	Bangkok	5		5	
2009 Phatthalung Shooting	Shooting	25 May 2009	Wang Mai Sub-districts Pa Bon district	Phatthalung	5	2	7	
2009 Chaloem Phra Kiat Shooting	Shooting	2 October 2009	Chaloem Phra Kiat district, Saraburi	Saraburi Province	5		5	

== 2010-2019 ==
Name	Attack types	Date	Location	Province	Deaths	Injured	Total	Notes
2010 Thai military crackdown	Shooting	April 2010	Neighbourhoods surrounding Ratchaprasong Intersection	Bangkok	87	2,100+	2,200+	
Mekong River massacre	Shooting, Stabbing	5 October 2011	Chiang Saen District	Chiang Rai Province	13		13	
2012 Pa Nakhon Si Ayutthaya Shooting	Shooting	12 March 2012	Khlong Suan Phlu subdistrictPhra Nakhon Si Ayutthaya district	Phra Nakhon Si Ayutthaya province	3		3	
2012 Southern Thailand bombings	Bombing	31 March 2012	Mueang Yala district, Yala Province and Hat Yai district, Songkhla Province	Yala, Songkhla	16	321+	337+	
2012 Nakhon Chai Si Shooting	Shooting	22 April 2012	Bang Krabao Nakhon Chai Si district	Nakhon Pathom province	3		3	
2012 Raman Car bombings	Bombing	25 July 2012	Wang Phaya Sub-districts Raman district	Yala province	5	1	6	
2012 Mayo Shooting	Shooting	28 July 2012	Mayo district, Pattani	Pattani Province	4		4	
2012 Sateng Nok Shooting	Shooting	15 September 2012	Sateng Nok Mueang Yala district	Yala province	4		4	
2012 Sai Buri Car bombings	Bombing	21 September 2012	Taluban Sub-districts Sai Buri district	Pattani province	6	51	57	
2012 Pattani Shooting	Shooting	1 May 2013	Ru Samilae Sub-districts Mueang Pattani district	Pattani province	6	1	7	
2013 Sam Sen Nai Shooting	Shooting	14 April 2013	Sam Sen Nai Sub-districts Phaya Thai district	Bangkok	2	6	8	
2013 Na Di Shooting	Shooting	15 April 2013	Na Di, Samut Sakhon Mueang Samut Sakhon district	Samut Sakhon province	2		2	
2013 Krong Pinang Bombings	Bombing	29 June 2013	Huai Krathing Sub-districts Krong Pinang district	Yala Province	8	3	11	
2014 Bangkok Shooting	Shooting	1 January 2014	Bangkok Bus Terminal (Chatuchak)	Bangkok	6	7	13	
2014 Bandu, Chiang rai Shooting	Shooting	23 February 2014	Ban Du, Chiang Rai	Chiang Rai	6		6	
2015 Hin Tang Shooting	Shooting	15 April 2015	Hin Tang Sub-districts Mueang Nakhon Nayok district	Nakhon Nayok province	2	3	5	
2015 Bangkok bombing	Bombing	17 August 2015	Erawan shrine, Ratchaprasong intersection	Bangkok	20	125	145	
August 2016 Thailand bombings	Bombing	11 August 2016	Several provinces in Southern Thailand including Phuket, Trang, Hua Hin, and Surat Thani	Phuket, Trang, Prachuap Khiri Khan, Surat Thani	4	36	40	
Shooting incident at Batutamong police station	Shooting	25 October 2016	Police residence behind Batutamong police station, Bannang Sata district	Yala	2	13	15	
Narathiwat School Bus Shootings	Shooting	2 March 2017	Khok Sato Sub-districts Rueso district	Narathiwat	4	1	5	
Chanae Car Bomb and Shooting	Car Bombing Shooting	27 April 2017	Phadung Mat Sub-district Chanae district	Narathiwat	6		6	
Wiang Phang Kham Shooting	Extrajudicial killing	26 May 2017	Wiang Phang Kham Mae Sai district	Chiang Rai Province	9		9	
Thung Yang Daeng Car Bomb and Shooting	Car Bombing Shooting	19 June 2017	Nam Dam Sub-districts Thung Yang Daeng district	Pattani	6		6	
Ao Luek shooting	Shooting	10 July 2017	Ban Klang Sub-districts Ao Luek district	Krabi	8	3	11	
2018 Bannang Sata Shooting	Shooting	11 June 2018	Bannang Sata district	Yala	5		5	
2019 Phaya Maen Shooting	Shooting	13 January 2019	Phaya Maen Phichai district	Uttaradit	5	2	7	
2019 Yala attack	Various	6 November 2019	Security posts in Lam Phaya, Mueang Yala	Yala	15	7	22	
2019 Chanthaburi Provincial Court Shooting	Shooting	12 November 2019	Chanthaburi Provincial Court Tambon Wat Mai, Mueang Chanthaburi District	Chanthaburi	3	2	5	

== 2020-present ==
Name	Attack types	Date	Location	Province	Deaths	Injured	Total	Notes
Lopburi mall shooting	Shooting	9 January 2020	Robinson Mall, Mueang Lopburi district	Lopburi	3	4	7	
Nakhon Ratchasima shootings	Shooting	8 February 2020	Surathamphithak Military Camp, Wat Pa Sattha Ruam, and Terminal 21 Korat mall	Nakhon Ratchasima	30	58	88	
2020 Bangkok Shooting	Shooting	17 September 2020	Thung Khru subdistrict Thung Khru district	Bangkok	5		5	
2020 Udon Thani mass stabbing	Stabbing	5 December 2020	A street in downtown Udon Thani, Mueang Udon Thani District	Udon Thani	2	5	7	
Shooting incident at Phuket Farmer's Market	Shooting	7 January 2022	Phuket Farmer's Market, Mueang Phuket district	Phuket	2	3	5	
2022 Mae Fa Luang Shooting	Extrajudicial killing	28 May 2022	Mae Fa Luang subdistrict Mae Fa Luang district	Chiang Rai Province	9		9	
Todeng shootings	Shooting	3 August 2022	Su-ngai Padi district	Narathiwat province	2		2	
Ubol Ratchathani gang shootings	Shooting	4 August 2022	Nightclub area in Mueang Ubon Ratchathani district	Ubon Ratchathani	3	6	9	
Mae Suai shootings	Shooting	14 July 2022	Pa Kia village, Mae Suai district	Chiang Rai	3	6	9	
2022 Khao Phanom Shooting	Shooting	6 September 2022	Khao Phanom district	Krabi Province	3		3	
Shooting incident at Army Training Command	Shooting	14 September 2022	Royal Thai Army War College, Army Training Command, Dusit district	Bangkok	2	1	3	
2022 Nong Bua Lamphu massacre	Various	6 October 2022	The nursery Utthai Sawan, Ban Nong Kung Si, and Ban Tha Uthai, Na Klang district	Nong Bua Lamphu	38	10	48	
Narathiwat police flat car bomb	Bombing	22 November 2022	Police flat, Mueang Narathiwat district	Narathiwat	1	31	32	
2022 Fang Shooting	Extrajudicial killing	8 December 2022	Fang district	Chiang Mai Province	15		15	
2023 Wang Chao Shooting	Shooting	8 February 2023	Wang Chao district	Tak	5		5	
2023 Waeng Shooting	Shooting	20 February 2023	Waeng district	Narathiwat	4		4	
2023 Khiri Rat Nikhom Shooting	Shooting	8 April 2023	Khiri Rat Nikhom district	Surat Thani	6		6	
2023 Khron Shooting	Shooting	19 June 2023	Khron Sawi district	Chumphon Province	2	1	3	
2023 Na Sak Shooting	Shooting	16 July 2023	Na sak sub-district Sawi district	Chumphon Province	4		4	
2023 Talat Bang Khen Shooting	Shooting	7 August 2023	Talat Bang Khen	Bangkok	5		5	
2023 Yarang Shooting	Shooting	28 August 2023	Yarang district	Pattani Province	4	9	13	
Siam Paragon shooting	Shooting	3 October 2023	Khwaeng Pathum Wan Pathum Wan district	Bangkok	3	4	7	
2023 Wang Nam Khiao Wedding shooting	Shooting	25 November 2023	Wang Nam Khiao, Wang Nam Khiao District	Nahkon Ratchasima	5	1	6	
2023 Na Kae shooting	Shooting	15 December 2023	Na Kae sub-districts Na Kae district	Nakhon Phanom province	2	1	3	
2023 Thoet Thai Shooting	Extrajudicial killing	17 December 2023	Thoet Thai Mae Fa Luang district	Chiang Rai Province	15		15	
2024 Nakhon Nayok Shooting	Shooting	11 January 2024	Sisa Krabue Ongkharak district	Nakhon Nayok province	2	1	3	
2024 Chang Phueak Bombing	Bombings	12 February 2024	Chang Phueak Chanae district	Narathiwat province	2	3	5	
2024 Phron Shooting	Shooting	19 February 2024	Phron Tak Bai district	Narathiwat province	2	2	4	
2024 Phatthana Nikhom Shooting	Shooting	21 March 2024	Phatthana Nikhom district	Lopburi province	3	1	4	
2024 Rueso Shooting	Shooting	7 April 2024	Batong Rueso district	Narathiwat province	2	9	11	
2024 Narathiwat bombing	Bombing	20 May 2024	Cho-airong district and Sukhirin district	Narathiwat province	2	11	13	
2024 Bang Pa-in Shooting	Shooting	13 June 2024	Sam Ruean Bang Pa-in district	Phra Nakhon Si Ayutthaya province	2	1	3	
2024 Bannang Sata (town) Bombing	Bombing	30 June 2024	Bannang Sata (town)	Yala	1	18	19	
2024 Bangkok hotel cyanide poisoning	Cyanide	17 July 2024	Grand Hyatt Erawan Bangkok	Bangkok	6	0	6	
2024 Mueang Sisaket Shooting	Shooting	23 July 2024	Mueang Sisaket district	Sisaket province	4		4	
2024 Mueang Songkhla Shooting	Shooting	7 October 2024	Mueang Songkhla district	Songkhla province	4		4	
2024 Mueang Samut Prakan Shooting	Shooting	25 November 2024	Mueang Samut Prakan district	Samut Prakan province	3	1	4	
2024 Si Bun Rueang Shooting	Shooting	27 November 2024	Si Bun Rueang district	Nong Bua Lam Phu province	3		3	
2024 Umphang Bombing	Bombing	13 December 2024	Umphang district	Tak province	4	48	52	
2024 Hat Yai Shooting	Shooting	22 December 2024	Hat Yai Hat Yai district	Songkhla province	2	3	5	
2025 Khlong Khlung Shooting	Shooting	12 January 2025	Khlong Khlung district	Kamphaeng Phet province	3	0	3	
2025 Trobon Bombing	Bombing	8 March 2025	Trobon Sai Buri district	Pattani province	3	1	4	
2025 Su-ngai Kolok Bombing	Bombing	8 March 2025	Su-ngai Kolok Su-ngai Kolok district	Narathiwat province	2	14	16	
2025 Khao Phra Bat Chian Yai Stabbing	Stabbing	2 April 2025	Khao Phra Bat Chian Yai district	Nakhon Si Thammarat province	3	0	3	
2025 U Thong Shooting	Shooting	30 May 2025	U Thong district	Suphan Buri province	3	1	4	
2025 Or Tor Kor Market shooting	Shooting	28 July 2025	Chatuchak District	Bangkok	6	2	8	
2025 Kamlon Festival Shooting	Shooting	30 July 2025	Lan Saka District	Nakhon Si Thammarat	2	7	9	
2026 Hat Yai school shooting	Shooting	11 February 2026	Hat Yai	Songkhla	1	3	4	
2026 Nonthaburi shootings	Shooting	7 August 2026	Bang Bua Thong district and Bang Kruai district	Nonthaburi	9	23+	?	
