= List of tambon in Thailand (R) =

This is a list of tambon (sub-districts) in Thailand, beginning with the letter R. This information is liable to change due to border changes or re-allocation of Tambons. Missing Tambon numbers show where the number is either not used or the Tambon has been transferred to a different Amphoe.

Sub-district (tambon)	ตำบล	District (amphoe)	อำเภอ	Province (changwat)	จังหวัด	Region
Ra-ngaeng	ระแงง	Sikhoraphum	ศีขรภูมิ	Surin	สุรินทร์	North-East
Rabam	ระบำ	Lan Sak	ลานสัก	Uthai Thani	อุทัยธานี	Central
Racha Thewa	ราชาเทวะ	Bang Phli	บางพลี	Samut Prakan	สมุทรปราการ	Central
Rae	แร่	Phang Khon	พังโคน	Sakon Nakhon	สกลนคร	North-East
Rahaeng	ระแหง	Mueang Tak	เมืองตาก	Tak	ตาก	West
Rahaeng	ระแหง	Lat Lum Kaeo	ลาดหลุมแก้ว	Pathum Thani	ปทุมธานี	Central
Rahan	ระหาน	Bueng Samakkhi	บึงสามัคคี	Kamphaeng Phet	กำแพงเพชร	Central
Rai	ไร่	Phanna Nikhom	พรรณนานิคม	Sakon Nakhon	สกลนคร	North-East
Rai Kao	ไร่เก่า	Sam Roi Yot	สามร้อยยอด	Prachuap Khiri Khan	ประจวบคีรีขันธ์	West
Rai Khi	ไร่ขี	Lue Amnat	ลืออำนาจ	Amnat Charoen	อำนาจเจริญ	North-East
Rai Khing	ไร่ขิง	Sam Phran	สามพราน	Nakhon Pathom	นครปฐม	Central
Rai Khok	ไร่โคก	Ban Lat	บ้านลาด	Phetchaburi	เพชรบุรี	West
Rai Lak Thong	ไร่หลักทอง	Phanat Nikhom	พนัสนิคม	Chonburi	ชลบุรี	East
Rai Mai	ไร่ใหม่	Sam Roi Yot	สามร้อยยอด	Prachuap Khiri Khan	ประจวบคีรีขันธ์	West
Rai Makham	ไร่มะขาม	Ban Lat	บ้านลาด	Phetchaburi	เพชรบุรี	West
Rai Noi	ไร่น้อย	Mueang Ubon Ratchathani	เมืองอุบลราชธานี	Ubon Ratchathani	อุบลราชธานี	North-East
Rai Oi	ไร่อ้อย	Phichai	พิชัย	Uttaradit	อุตรดิตถ์	North
Rai Phatthana	ไร่พัฒนา	Manorom	มโนรมย์	Chai Nat	ชัยนาท	Central
Rai Rot	ไร่รถ	Don Chedi	ดอนเจดีย์	Suphan Buri	สุพรรณบุรี	Central
Rai Sathon	ไร่สะท้อน	Ban Lat	บ้านลาด	Phetchaburi	เพชรบุรี	West
Rai Si Suk	ไร่สีสุก	Senangkhanikhom	เสนางคนิคม	Amnat Charoen	อำนาจเจริญ	North-East
Rai Som	ไร่ส้ม	Mueang Phetchaburi	เมืองเพชรบุรี	Phetchaburi	เพชรบุรี	West
Rai Tai	ไร่ใต้	Phibun Mangsahan	พิบูลมังสาหาร	Ubon Ratchathani	อุบลราชธานี	North-East
Ram	ราม	Mueang Surin	เมืองสุรินทร์	Surin	สุรินทร์	North-East
Ram Daeng	รำแดง	Singhanakhon	สิงหนคร	Songkhla	สงขลา	South
Ram Inthra	รามอินทรา	Khet Khan Na Yao	คันนายาว	Bangkok	กรุงเทพมหานคร	Central
Ram Kaeo	รามแก้ว	Hua Sai	หัวไทร	Nakhon Si Thammarat	นครศรีธรรมราช	South
Ram Ma Sak	รำมะสัก	Pho Thong	โพธิ์ทอง	Ang Thong	อ่างทอง	Central
Ram Rat	รามราช	Tha Uthen	ท่าอุเทน	Nakhon Phanom	นครพนม	North-East
Ramphan	รำพัน	Tha Mai	ท่าใหม่	Chanthaburi	จันทบุรี	East
Rang Bua	รางบัว	Chom Bueng	จอมบึง	Ratchaburi	ราชบุรี	West
Rang Chon Khe	รางจรเข้	Sena	เสนา	Phra Nakhon Si Ayutthaya	พระนครศรีอยุธยา	Central
Rang Ka Yai	รังกาใหญ่	Phimai	พิมาย	Nakhon Ratchasima	นครราชสีมา	North-East
Rang Ngam	รังงาม	Noen Sa-nga	เนินสง่า	Chaiyaphum	ชัยภูมิ	North-East
Rang Nok	รังนก	Sam Ngam	สามง่าม	Phichit	พิจิตร	Central
Rang Phikun	รางพิกุล	Kamphaeng Saen	กำแพงแสน	Nakhon Pathom	นครปฐม	Central
Rang Raeng	รังแร้ง	Uthumphon Phisai	อุทุมพรพิสัย	Sisaket	ศรีสะเกษ	North-East
Rang Sali	รางสาลี่	Tha Muang	ท่าม่วง	Kanchanaburi	กาญจนบุรี	West
Rang Wai	รางหวาย	Phanom Thuan	พนมทวน	Kanchanaburi	กาญจนบุรี	West
Rangsit	รังสิต	Thanyaburi	ธัญบุรี	Pathum Thani	ปทุมธานี	Central
Ranot	ระโนด	Ranot (Malay: Renut)	ระโนด	Songkhla	สงขลา	South
Rao Ton Chan	ราวต้นจันทร์	Si Samrong	ศรีสำโรง	Sukhothai	สุโขทัย	Central
Rap Ro	รับร่อ	Tha Sae	ท่าแซะ	Chumphon	ชุมพร	South
Raroeng	ระเริง	Wang Nam Khiao	วังน้ำเขียว	Nakhon Ratchasima	นครราชสีมา	North-East
Rasom	ระโสม	Phachi	ภาชี	Phra Nakhon Si Ayutthaya	พระนครศรีอยุธยา	Central
Rat Burana	ราษฎร์บูรณะ	Khet Rat Burana	ราษฎร์บูรณะ	Bangkok	กรุงเทพมหานคร	Central
Rat Charoen	ราษฎร์เจริญ	Phayakkhaphum Phisai	พยัคฆภูมิพิสัย	Maha Sarakham	มหาสารคาม	North-East
Rat Niyom	ราษฎร์นิยม	Sai Noi	ไทรน้อย	Nonthaburi	นนทบุรี	Central
Rat Phatthana	ราษฎร์พัฒนา	Phayakkhaphum Phisai	พยัคฆภูมิพิสัย	Maha Sarakham	มหาสารคาม	North-East
Rat Phatthana	ราษฎร์พัฒนา	Khet Saphan Sung	สะพานสูง	Bangkok	กรุงเทพมหานคร	Central
Rata Panyang	ราตาปันยัง	Yaring (Malay: Jamu)	ยะหริ่ง	Pattani	ปัตตานี	South
Ratchadaphisek	รัชดาภิเษก	Khet Din Daeng	ดินแดง	Bangkok	กรุงเทพมหานคร	Central
Ratchakhram	ราชคราม	Bang Sai	บางไทร	Phra Nakhon Si Ayutthaya	พระนครศรีอยุธยา	Central
Ratchakrut	ราชกรูด	Mueang Ranong	เมืองระนอง	Ranong	ระนอง	South
Ratchasathit	ราชสถิตย์	Chaiyo	ไชโย	Ang Thong	อ่างทอง	Central
Ratchathani	ราชธานี	Thawat Buri	ธวัชบุรี	Roi Et	ร้อยเอ็ด	North-East
Ratsada	รัษฎา	Mueang Phuket	เมืองภูเก็ต	Phuket	ภูเก็ต	South
Ratsadon Phatthana	ราษฎรพัฒนา	Samko	สามโก้	Ang Thong	อ่างทอง	Central
Rattanaburi	รัตนบุรี	Rattanaburi	รัตนบุรี	Surin	สุรินทร์	North-East
Rattanawapi	รัตนวาปี	Rattanawapi	รัตนวาปี	Nong Khai	หนองคาย	North-East
Rattanawari	รัตนวารี	Hua Taphan	หัวตะพาน	Amnat Charoen	อำนาจเจริญ	North-East
Rattaphum	รัตภูมิ	Khuan Niang	ควนเนียง	Songkhla	สงขลา	South
Rawa	ระวะ	Ranot (Malay: Renut)	ระโนด	Songkhla	สงขลา	South
Rawaeng	ระแว้ง	Yarang	ยะรัง	Pattani	ปัตตานี	South
Rawai	ราไวย์	Mueang Phuket	เมืองภูเก็ต	Phuket	ภูเก็ต	South
Rawe	ระเว	Phibun Mangsahan	พิบูลมังสาหาร	Ubon Ratchathani	อุบลราชธานี	North-East
Rawiang	ระเวียง	Non Narai	โนนนารายณ์	Surin	สุรินทร์	North-East
Rawing	ระวิง	Mueang Phetchabun	เมืองเพชรบูรณ์	Phetchabun	เพชรบูรณ์	Central
Rai Mai Phatthana	ไร่ใหม่พัฒนา	Cha-am	ชะอำ	Phetchaburi	เพชรบุรี	West
Renu	เรณู	Renu Nakhon	เรณูนคร	Nakhon Phanom	นครพนม	North-East
Renu Tai	เรณูใต้	Renu Nakhon	เรณูนคร	Nakhon Phanom	นครพนม	North-East
Riang	เรียง	Rueso (Malay: Rusa)	รือเสาะ	Narathiwat	นราธิวาส	South
Riko	ริโก๋	Su-ngai Padi (Malay: Sungai Padi)	สุไหงปาดี	Narathiwat	นราธิวาส	South
Rim	ริม	Tha Wang Pha	ท่าวังผา	Nan	น่าน	North
Rim Khong	ริมโขง	Chiang Khong	เชียงของ	Chiang Rai	เชียงราย	North
Rim Kok	ริมกก	Mueang Chiang Rai	เมืองเชียงราย	Chiang Rai	เชียงราย	North
Rim Nuea	ริมเหนือ	Mae Rim	แม่ริม	Chiang Mai	เชียงใหม่	North
Rim Ping	ริมปิง	Mueang Lamphun	เมืองลำพูน	Lamphun	ลำพูน	North
Rim Si Muang	ริมสีม่วง	Khao Kho	เขาค้อ	Phetchabun	เพชรบูรณ์	Central
Rim Tai	ริมใต้	Mae Rim	แม่ริม	Chiang Mai	เชียงใหม่	North
Roeng Rang	เริงราง	Sao Hai	เสาไห้	Saraburi	สระบุรี	Central
Rom Klao	ร่มเกล้า	Nikhom Kham Soi	นิคมคำสร้อย	Mukdahan	มุกดาหาร	North-East
Rom Mueang	ร่มเมือง	Mueang Phatthalung	เมืองพัทลุง	Phatthalung	พัทลุง	South
Rom Sai	ร่มไทร	Sukhirin	สุคิริน	Narathiwat	นราธิวาส	South
Rom Yen	ร่มเย็น	Chiang Kham	ชียงคำ	Phayao	พะเยา	North
Rommani	รมณีย์	Kapong	กะปง	Phang Nga	พังงา	South
Ron Phibun	ร่อนพิบูลย์	Ron Phibun	ร่อนพิบูลย์	Nakhon Si Thammarat	นครศรีธรรมราช	South
Ron Thong	ร่อนทอง	Bang Saphan	บางสะพาน	Prachuap Khiri Khan	ประจวบคีรีขันธ์	West
Ron Thong	ร่อนทอง	Satuek	สตึก	Buriram	บุรีรัมย์	North-East
Rong	โรง	Krasae Sin	กระแสสินธุ์	Songkhla	สงขลา	South
Rong Chang	โรงช้าง	Pa Mok	ป่าโมก	Ang Thong	อ่างทอง	Central
Rong Chang	โรงช้าง	Pa Daet	ป่าแดด	Chiang Rai	เชียงราย	North
Rong Chang	โรงช้าง	Phrom Buri	พรหมบุรี	Sing Buri	สิงห์บุรี	Central
Rong Chang	โรงช้าง	Maha Rat	มหาราช	Phra Nakhon Si Ayutthaya	พระนครศรีอยุธยา	Central
Rong Chang	โรงช้าง	Mueang Phichit	เมืองพิจิตร	Phichit	พิจิตร	Central
Rong Chik	ร่องจิก	Phu Ruea	ภูเรือ	Loei	เลย	North-East
Rong Fong	ร่องฟอง	Mueang Phrae	เมืองแพร่	Phrae	แพร่	North
Rong Hip	โรงหีบ	Bang Khonthi	บางคนที	Samut Songkhram	สมุทรสงคราม	Central
Rong Kat	ร่องกาศ	Sung Men	สูงเม่น	Phrae	แพร่	North
Rong Khe	โรงเข้	Ban Lat	บ้านลาด	Phetchaburi	เพชรบุรี	West
Rong Khe	โรงเข้	Ban Phaeo	บ้านแพ้ว	Samut Sakhon	สมุทรสาคร	Central
Rong Khem	ร้องเข็ม	Rong Kwang	ร้องกวาง	Phrae	แพร่	North
Rong Kho	ร่องเคาะ	Wang Nuea	วังเหนือ	Lampang	ลำปาง	North
Rong Kwang	ร้องกวาง	Rong Kwang	ร้องกวาง	Phrae	แพร่	North
Rong Mueang	รองเมือง	Khet Pathum Wan	ปทุมวัน	Bangkok	กรุงเทพมหานคร	Central
Rong Wua Daeng	ร้องวัวแดง	San Kamphaeng	สันกำแพง	Chiang Mai	เชียงใหม่	North
Rop Mueang	รอบเมือง	Mueang Chaiyaphum	เมืองชัยภูมิ	Chaiyaphum	ชัยภูมิ	North-East
Rop Mueang	รอบเมือง	Mueang Roi Et	เมืองร้อยเอ็ด	Roi Et	ร้อยเอ็ด	North-East
Rop Mueang	รอบเมือง	Mueang Prachinburi	เมืองปราจีนบุรี	Prachin Buri	ปราจีนบุรี	East
Rop Mueang	รอบเมือง	Nong Phok	หนองพอก	Roi Et	ร้อยเอ็ด	North-East
Rop Wiang	รอบเวียง	Mueang Chiang Rai	เมืองเชียงราย	Chiang Rai	เชียงราย	North
Rua Yai	รั้วใหญ่	Mueang Suphanburi	เมืองสุพรรณบุรี	Suphan Buri	สุพรรณบุรี	Central
Ruam Chit	ร่วมจิต	Tha Pla	ท่าปลา	Uttaradit	อุตรดิตถ์	North
Ruam Thai Phatthana	รวมไทยพัฒนา	Phop Phra	พบพระ	Tak	ตาก	West
Rueso	รือเสาะ	Rueso (Malay: Rusa)	รือเสาะ	Narathiwat	นราธิวาส	South
Rueso Ok	รือเสาะออก	Rueso (Malay: Rusa)	รือเสาะ	Narathiwat	นราธิวาส	South
Rung	รุง	Kantharalak	กันทรลักษ์	Sisaket	ศรีสะเกษ	North-East
Rung Rawi	รุ่งระวี	Nam Kliang	น้ำเกลี้ยง	Sisaket	ศรีสะเกษ	North-East
Ru Samilae	รูสะมิแล	Mueang Pattani (Malay: Patani)	เมืองปัตตานี	Pattani	ปัตตานี	South

== See also ==
- Organization of the government of Thailand
- List of districts of Thailand
- List of districts of Bangkok
- List of tambon in Thailand
- Provinces of Thailand
- List of municipalities in Thailand
