= Mon Jam =

Mountain viewpoint in Chiang Mai province, Thailand

- ม่อนแจ่ม
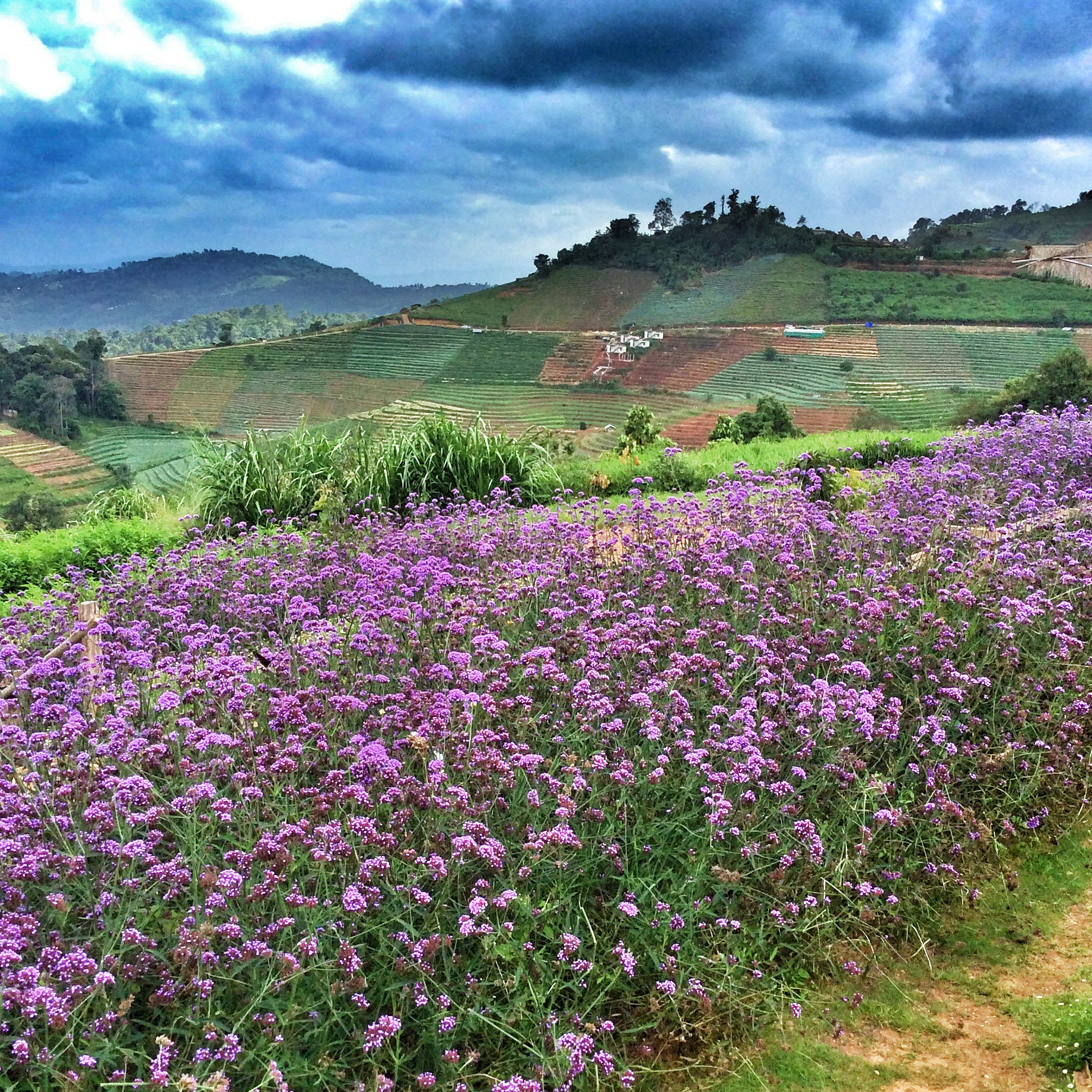
- View from the Mon Jam ridge

Highest point
- Elevation: 1,350 m (4,430 ft)
- Coordinates: 18°56′45″N 98°51′30″E

Geography
- Location within Thailand
- Location: Mae Raem, Mae Rim district, Chiang Mai province, Thailand

Climbing
- Easiest route: Road access from Mae Rim

Mon Jam, also spelt Mon Cham (Thai: ม่อนแจ่ม), is a mountain viewpoint and tourist destination in Mae Rim district, Chiang Mai province, Thailand. It is known for its flower gardens, mountain views and cool climate. The area is part of the Nong Hoi Royal Project, which was established to help local farmers grow alternative crops instead of opium.

== Location ==
Mon Jam is located approximately 40–50 kilometres from the city of Chiang Mai, on a mountain ridge near the Hmong village of Nong Hoi in Mae Raem, Mae Rim district. It is approximately 1,350 metres above sea level.

Nearby is Mon Long (ม่อนล่อง), also known as Mon Khwam Long (ม่อนคว่ำล่อง). It is a mountain viewpoint at an elevation of approximately 1,450–1,460 metres and is described as the highest viewpoint in Mae Rim district. Mon Long can be reached by continuing along the road past Mon Jam.

According to a local legend, Mon Long is the burial place of Khun Luang Wilangka, a legendary ruler of the Lawa people. The name Mon Khwam Long comes from a story in which his coffin overturned during the funeral procession.

== History ==
=== Nong Hoi Royal Project ===
Before its development as a tourist destination, Mon Jam was known as Kiw Suea (กิ่วเสือ). The area had been cleared for shifting cultivation and opium growing, leaving parts of the mountain with little forest cover.

In 1984, King Bhumibol Adulyadej visited Nong Hoi and learned that local residents were still growing opium and living in poverty. Prince Bhisadej Rajani, director of the Royal Project, subsequently established the Nong Hoi Royal Project Development Center to help villagers find other sources of income.

The project encouraged local farmers, including members of the Hmong community, to grow temperate vegetables, fruit and flowers instead of opium. It also worked to restore the environment and improve local livelihoods. The project introduced new farming methods and developed demonstration plots for agricultural crops.

=== Development as a tourist destination ===
In late 2009, the Royal Project began developing the former Kiw Suea area as a tourist destination. The development was led by Jamjaras Sucheewa (แจ่มจรัส สุชีวะ), a grandson of Prince Bhisadej Rajani. The site was developed with flower gardens, viewpoints, restaurants and camping accommodation.

The development team chose the name "Mon Jam" after considering several names. According to MGR Online, the name was chosen because it sounded pleasant and matched the name of nearby Mon Long, the highest viewpoint in Mae Rim district.

Mon Jam opened to tourists in late 2009. Its location, mountain views and cool climate attracted visitors, and the area soon became a popular tourist destination. Restaurants, resorts, homestays and camping sites were later established around Mon Jam and in nearby parts of Mae Raem and Pong Yaeng.

=== Tourism development and land-use disputes ===
The growth of tourism at Mon Jam led to an increase in accommodation businesses and other tourist facilities. Some local farmers changed from agriculture to tourism-related work. The rapid development also led to concerns about forest clearing, waste and the construction of buildings without permission.

In early 2020, the Royal Forest Department began efforts to regulate tourism businesses around Mon Jam. Officials examined resorts and other buildings in areas where land use was restricted. Some villagers opposed the measures because they affected their businesses and livelihoods.

In August 2020, officials reported that 113 resort or hotel operators in the Mon Jam area and nearby communities had used land in ways that did not follow the purposes of the Royal Project. Of these, 82 were described as less serious cases, while 30 were identified for stronger legal action.

The authorities announced plans to demolish buildings at the 30 resorts. Demolition work began at Mon Doi Loi Fa, while action against the remaining resorts was planned. The dispute concerned land within the Mae Rim National Reserved Forest and areas used under the Royal Project.

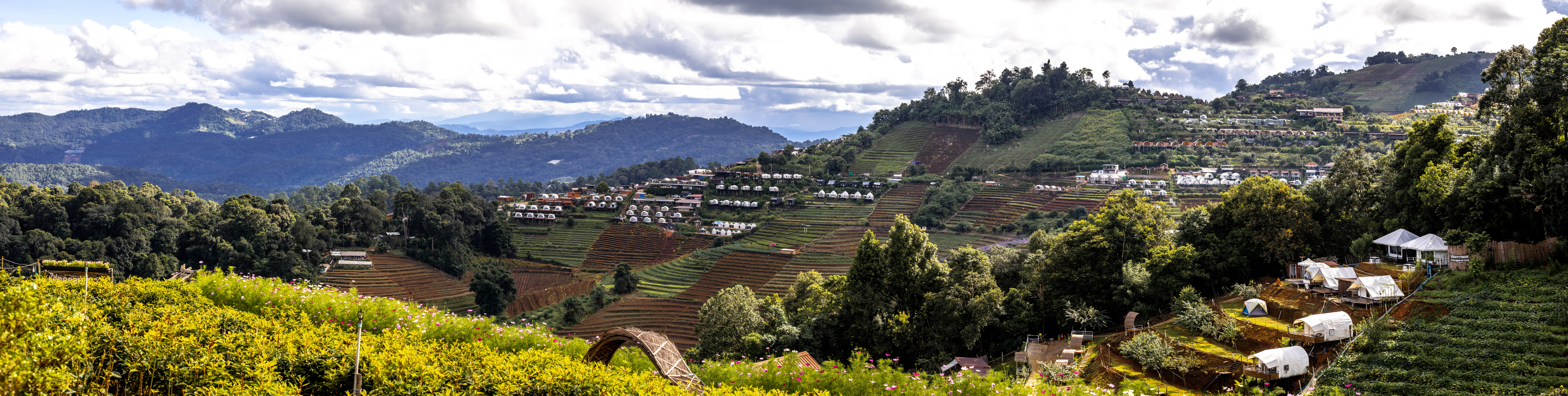
Panoramic view of Mon Jam.
