= San Kamphaeng =

San Kamphaeng or Sankamphaeng may refer to:

- San Kamphaeng district in Chiang Mai Province, northern Thailand
- San Kamphaeng subdistrict, in the district
- Sankamphaeng Range, a mountain range separating Eastern Thailand from Isan
