= Huai Sai =

Huai Sai' may refer to several places in Thailand:

- Huai Sai, Mae Rim
- Huai Sai, Prachuap Khiri Khan
- Huai Sai, San Kamphaeng
