= Yala, Thailand =

Yala ยะลา
- City Municipality
- City of Yala เทศบาลนครยะลา
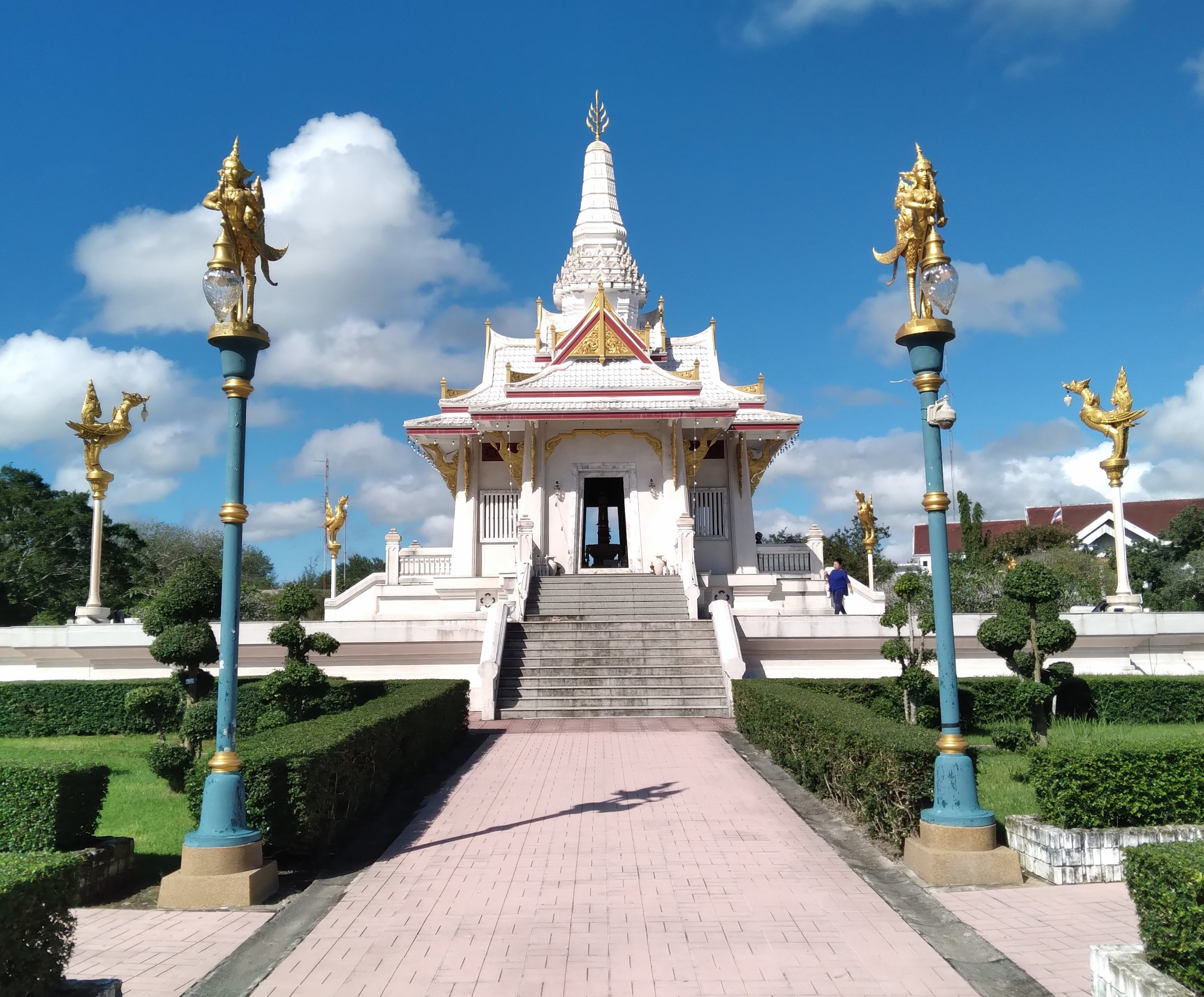
- Yala City Pillar Shrine

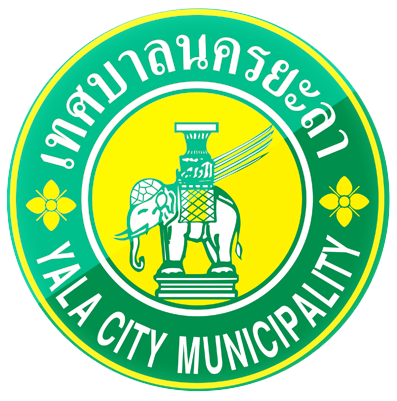
- Seal

- Location in Thailand
- Coordinates: 6°32′33″N 101°16′59″E
- Country: Thailand
- Province: Yala
- District: Mueang Yala

Government
  - Type: City Municipality
  - Mayor: Pongsak Yingchonchaoen

Area
  - Total: 19 km^{2} (7.3 sq mi)

Population (2019)
  - Total: 60,617
  - Density: 3,200/km^{2} (8,300/sq mi)
- Time zone: UTC+7 (ICT)
- Area code: (+66) 73
- Website: yalacity.go.th

Yala (Thai: ยะลา, pronounced [jáʔlaː] or [jálaː]) is a city and seat of Mueang Yala District and Yala Province of far southern Thailand. The provincial and district capital, it is 137 kilometres by road southeast of Hat Yai. The eastern part of the city is part of the neighboring tambon of Sateng Nok. As of 2019 the tambon had a total population of 60,617. It lies on the border with Pattani Province in the north of Yala Province. It lies on Thailand Route 4106, south of Khao Tum and north of Krong Pinang. Yala railway station is on the State Railway of Thailand Southern Line. Yala is approximately 1,100 km south of Bangkok.

== History ==
Yala used to be part of the Pattani kingdom. When Ayutthaya was captured by the Burmese in 1767, Yala, along with other southern colonies, became independent. Yala was again included as part of Thailand about 41 years later. In September 1977, King Bhumibol Adulyadej and Queen Sirikit of Thailand narrowly avoided assassination by the BRN after a bomb exploded nearby during a visit. On 9 October, policemen from the 12th Provincial Police Headquarters and the Yala Provincial Police Headquarters arrested Abdun Romae Haron, Mae Prachu, and Choning Saing on charges of conspiring with the escaped convicts Hayi Masae, Choya Samae, and Abdun Romae in attempting to kill the monarchs.

== Landmarks ==
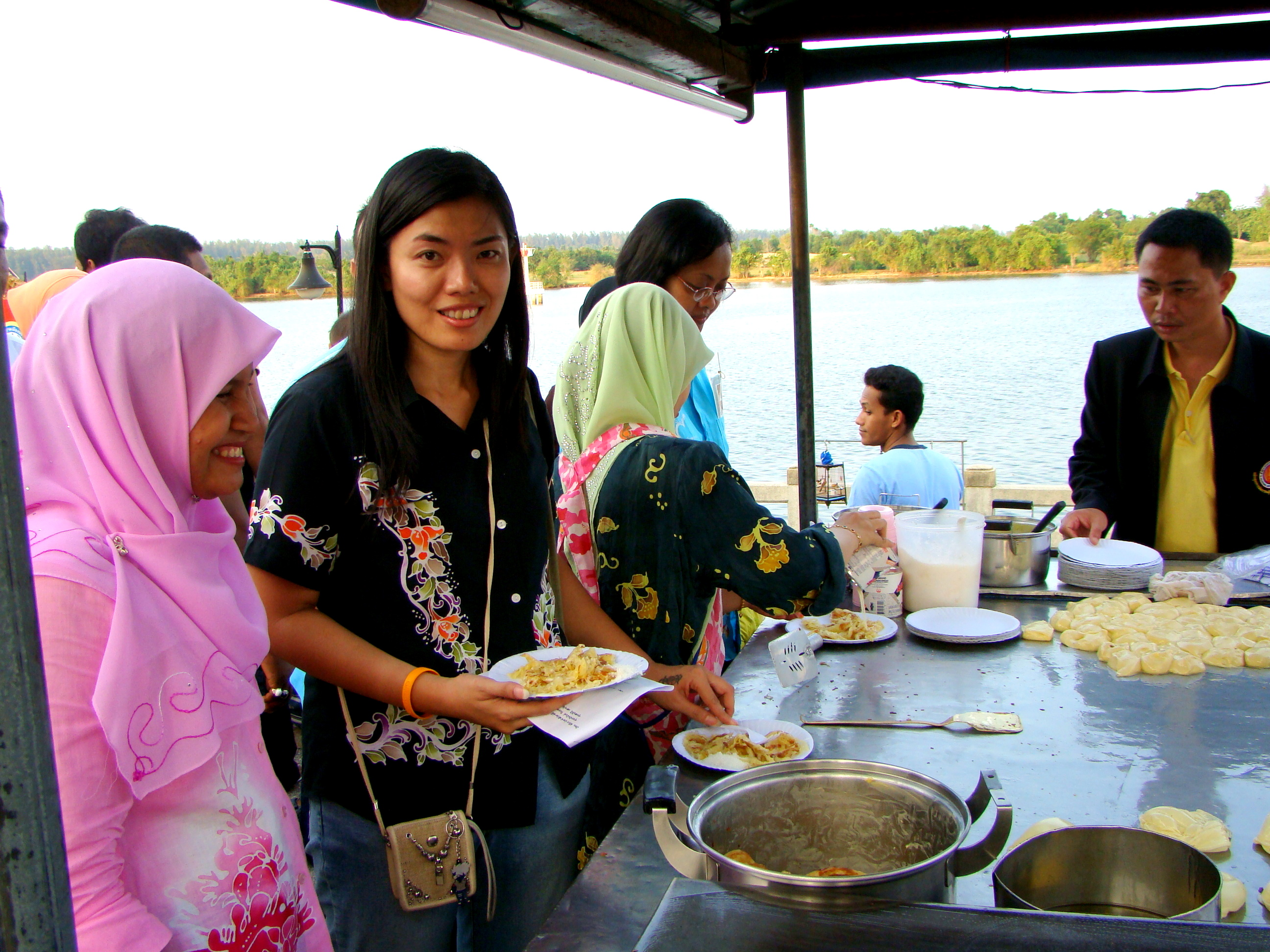
On the river

The city surrounds around a circular park and is meticulously laid out, centered along Phang Mueang, the central thoroughfare. There is a large park to the west of this with a lake and swamp. The city contains a pillar shrine, Yala Central Mosque, and a field hospital. Yala Central Mosque is a large mosque with a square shaped roof and green dome, on the main road towards the north of the city. It has existed in its location for over a century and was damaged during the Japanese invasion of Thailand, but was subsequently rebuilt after World War II. Yala Hospital and Siroros Hospital, on Route 4106, serve the surrounding district. The Tham Phab Khien Fa Panang caves lie to the east of Yala on the way to Budi and contain 500-year-old rock paintings.

== Economy ==
The main occupations of the people are trade, agriculture, business, and governmental services, given that it is the capital of Mueang Yala District and contains district offices. Secondary industry also has some significance, given that the city contains the Muang Yala municipal slaughterhouse in the western part of the city near the river bank, the Shaapan rubber factory, Sun Thai Yala Co. Ltd. (a wood processing firm), Charoenporn ice plant, and mineral water bottler.

== Health ==
Yala Hospital, the main hospital of Yala province, is located within the city.

== See also ==
- Yala Technical College
