= Bangkok shooting =

Bangkok shooting may refer to:

- Siam Paragon shooting, 2023
- Or Tor Kor Market shooting, 2025

== See also ==
- List of massacres in Thailand
