= Yala railway station =

Railway station in Sateng, Thailand

Coordinates: 6.5606°N 101.2928°E

Yala ยะลา
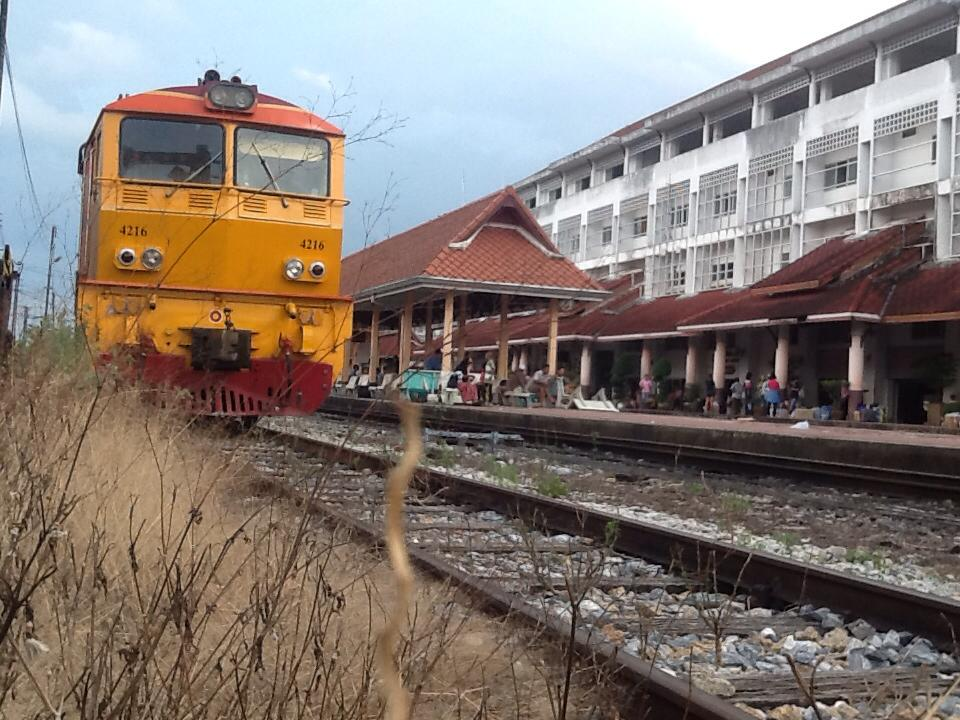

General information
- Location: Sibamrung Road, Sateng Sub-district, Yala City
- Owner: State Railway of Thailand
- Line: Southern Line
- Platforms: 3
- Tracks: 5

Other information
- Station code: ยล.

History
- Opened: November 1919

Services
Preceding station	State Railway of Thailand	Following station
Tase towards Hua Lamphong or Krung Thep Aphiwat	Southern Line	Mai Kaen towards Su-ngai Kolok
Location

Yala railway station is in Sateng Sub-district, Yala City, Yala Province. It is a class 1 station, 1,038.744 km (645.4 mi) from Thon Buri railway station. It opened in November 1919 as part of the Southern Line Khlong Sai-Balo section. The railway extended to Su-ngai Kolok in September 1921 to connect to the Malaysian railways.

== Train services ==
- Thaksin Special Express train No. 37 / 38 Bangkok - Su-ngai Kolok - Bangkok
- Diesel Rail Special Express train No. 41 / 42 Bangkok - Yala - Bangkok
- Rapid train No. 169 / 170 Bangkok - Yala - Bangkok
- Rapid train No. 171 / 172 Bangkok - Su-ngai Kolok - Bangkok
- Rapid train No. 175 / 176 Hat Yai Junction - Su-ngai Kolok - Hat Yai Junction
- Local train No. 447 / 448 Surat Thani - Su-ngai Kolok - Surat Thani
- Local train No. 451 / 452 Nakhon Si Thammarat- Su-ngai Kolok- Nakhon Si Thammarat
- Local train No. 453 / 454 Yala - Su-ngai Kolok - Yala
- Local train No. 455 / 456 Nakhon Si Thammarat- Yala -Nakhon Si Thammarat
- Local train No. 463 / 464 Phatthalung-Su-ngai Kolok-Phatthalung
