= Wat Chai Si Phum =

Coordinates: 18.7946°N 98.9941°E

- วัดชัยศรีภูมิ์

Religion
- Affiliation: Buddhism
- Sect: Maha Nikaya

Location
- Location: Si Phum, Mueang Chiang Mai district, Chiang Mai province, Thailand
- Country: Thailand
- Interactive map of Wat Chai Si Phum

Wat Chai Si Phum (Thai: วัดชัยศรีภูมิ์), also known as Wat Phan Ta Koen (Thai: วัดพันต๋าเกิ๋น), is a Buddhist temple in Mueang Chiang Mai district, Chiang Mai province, Thailand. It stands near Si Phum Corner (Thai: แจ่งศรีภูมิ), at the northeastern corner of the old city of Chiang Mai, near the former city moat.

== History ==
The temple was formerly known as Wat Phan Ta Koen. According to local tradition, a military officer named Phan Ta Koen was involved in its construction, giving the temple its former name. It later became known as Wat Chai Si Phum because of its location near Si Phum Corner.

The temple is believed to have been established during the reign of King Mueang Kaeo of Lan Na, although some accounts place its foundation earlier, during the reign of King Tilokaraj. It is also identified with Wat Asokaram, a monastery mentioned in the Chinakalamali in connection with the Red Sandalwood Buddha (Phra Kaen Chan Daeng).

The temple was later abandoned for an extended period. The site was cleared in 1837 (Buddhist Era 2380) for monks to conduct religious observances. An ordination hall was built in 1841 and consecrated in 1843, and monastic residences were added in 1844.

== Architecture ==
The vihara has a two-tiered roof. Its hang hong ornaments are shaped like naga figures and decorated with Ava glass. The eyebrow beams have honeycomb decorations, while the gable features a carving of Vishnu riding Garuda and other carved wooden designs. The roof brackets are made of carved wood and decorated with lacquer and gilding.

The scripture hall (ho trai) is a two-storey wooden building, with a library on the lower floor and Buddhist scriptures on the upper floor. The temple also has a prasat-style chedi with four niches. Its upper section is decorated with thong changko metalwork and an umbrella finial. A wall surrounds the chedi.

The temple buildings also include an ordination hall, a preaching hall and monastic residences.
