= Sai Mun =

Sai Mun may refer to:

- Sai Mun District, a district (amphoe) in Yasothon Province, Thailand
  - Sai Mun Subdistrict Sai Mun District
- Sai Mun Subdistrict in Nam Phong District, Khon Kaen, Thailand
- Sai Mun, Chiang Mai, a subdistrict (tambon) in San Kamphaeng District, Chiang Mai, Thailand
- Sai Mun Subdistrict in Ongkharak District, Nakhon Nayok, Thailand
- Sai Mun Subdistrict in Sawang Daen Din District, Sakon Nakhon, Thailand
- Sai Mun Subdistrict in Phibun Mangsahan District, Ubon Ratchathani, Thailand
