= Nai Mueang =

Nai Mueang (Thai: ในเมือง) may refer to:

- Nai Mueang, Lamphun, in Mueang Lamphun district, Thailand
- Nai Mueang, Uttaradit, Thailand
- Nai Mueang, Buriram, in Mueang Buriram district, Thailand
