= Yupo =

Yupo may refer to:

- Yupo (manufacturer), produces a Tyvek-like fabric
- Yupo Subdistrict, a subdistrict (tambon) of Thailand
