= Tase railway station =

Railway station in Ta Se, Thailand

Ta Se ตาเซะ
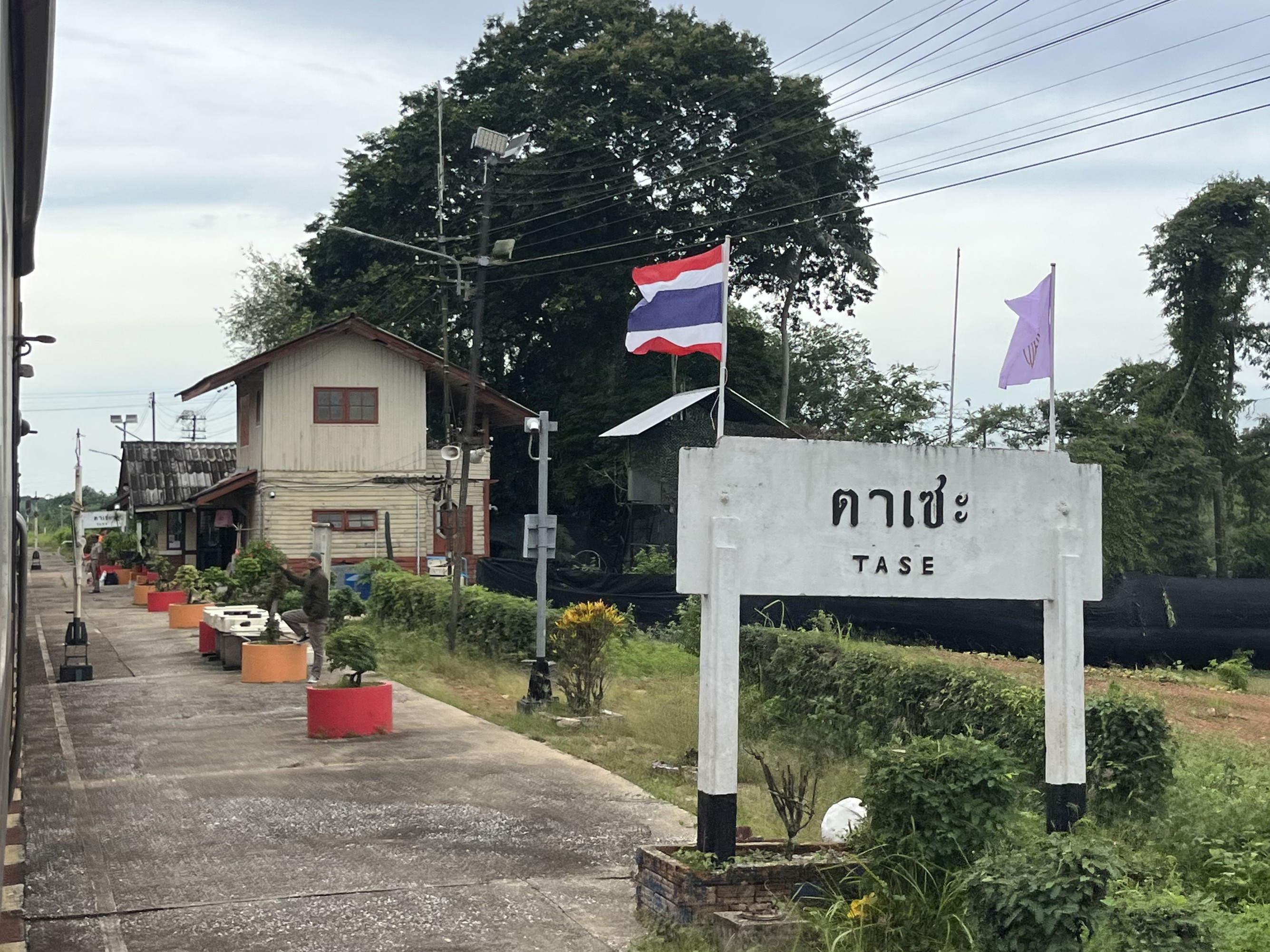

General information
- Location: Mu 3 (Ban Ta Se), Ta Se Subdistrict, Yala City
- Coordinates: 6.6147°N 101.2581°E
- Owner: State Railway of Thailand
- Line: Southern Line
- Platforms: 1
- Tracks: 2

Other information
- Station code: ตซ.

Services
Preceding station	State Railway of Thailand	Following station
Khlong Sai towards Hua Lamphong or Krung Thep Aphiwat	Southern Line	Yala towards Su-ngai Kolok
Location

Ta Se railway station (Thai: ตาเซะ) is a railway station located in Ta Se Subdistrict, Yala City, Yala. It is a class 3 railway station located 1,031.590 km (641.0 mi) from Thon Buri railway station.

== 2005 train bombings ==
On 19 October 2005, separatists planted three 20 kg bombs under the railway tracks between Tase and Yala, around the 1036 km post. The bombs were planted at 20-metre intervals and exploded when a scheduled military train, No. 2071, was running towards Yala. Of the three bombs planted, only two bombs were ignited (ones at the front and back) of the train. No one was injured from the bombings and the train was carefully driven up to Yala railway station. The event was part of the South Thailand Insurgency.

== Services ==
- Local No. 447/448 Surat Thani-Sungai Kolok-Surat Thani
- Local No. 451/452 Nakhon Si Thammarat-Sungai Kolok-Nakhon Si Thammarat
- Local No. 455/456 Nakhon Si Thammarat-Yala-Nakhon Si Thammarat
- Local No. 463/464 Phatthalung-Sungai Kolok-Phatthalung
