= Ban Mo =

Ban Mo may refer to:

บ้านหมอ (pronounced [bâːn.mɔ̌ː])

- Ban Mo District in Saraburi Province

บ้านหม้อ (pronounced [bâːn.mɔ̂ː])

- Ban Mo, Bangkok a street and neighbourhood in Bangkok
- Ban Mo Subdistrict in Mueang Phetchaburi District
- Ban Mo Subdistrict in Phrom Buri District, Sing Buri
- Ban Mo Subdistrict in Si Chiang Mai District, Nong Khai
- Ban Mo, Uttaradit, a subdistrict in Phichai District, Uttaradit
