= Khilek =

Khilek is the name of the plant Senna siamea in Thai.

Several places in Thailand are named after this plant:

- Khilek, Mae Taeng
- Khilek, Mae Rim
- Khilek, Nam Khun
