= Bannang Sata =

Bannang Sata may refer to

- Bannang Sata (town), Yala province, Thailand
- Bannang Sata district, or one of its subdistricts, in Yala province, Thailand
