= Na In =

Coordinates: 17°13′N 100°12′E

Na In นาอิน
- Tambon
- Interactive map of Na In
- Country: Thailand
- Province: Uttaradit
- District: Phichai District

Population (2005)
  - Total: 5,751
- Time zone: UTC+7 (ICT)

Na In (Thai: นาอิน, pronounced [nāː ʔīn]) is a village and tambon (sub-district) of Phichai District, in Uttaradit Province, Thailand. In 2005 it had a population of 5751 people. The tambon contains seven villages.
