= On Tai =

On Tai ออนใต้
- Tambon
- Country: Thailand
- Province: Chiang Mai
- District: San Kamphaeng

Population (2005)
  - Total: 5,371
- Time zone: UTC+7 (ICT)

On Tai (Thai: ออนใต้) is a tambon (subdistrict) of San Kamphaeng District, in Chiang Mai Province, Thailand. In 2005 it had a population of 5,371 people. The tambon contains 11 villages.
