= Mae Sa =

Coordinates: 18.9033°N 98.9494°E

- Tambon
- Interactive map of Mae Sa
- Country: Thailand
- Province: Chiang Mai
- District: Mae Rim

Population (2005)
  - Total: 6,448
- Time zone: UTC+7 (ICT)

Mae Sa (Thai: ?) is a tambon (subdistrict) of Mae Rim District, in Chiang Mai Province, Thailand. In 2005 it had a population of 6,448 people. The tambon contains six villages.
