= San Pong =

Coordinates: 18.9424°N 98.9439°E

San Pong สันโป่ง
- Tambon
- Interactive map of San Pong
- Country: Thailand
- Province: Chiang Mai
- District: Mae Rim

Population (2005)
  - Total: 9,425
- Time zone: UTC+7 (ICT)

San Pong (Thai: สันโป่ง) is a tambon (subdistrict) of Mae Rim District, in Chiang Mai Province, Thailand. In 2005 it had a population of 9,425 people. The tambon contains 11 villages.
