= Na Yang =

- Tambon
- Country: Thailand
- Province: Uttaradit
- District: Phichai District

Population (2005)
  - Total: 8,831
- Time zone: UTC+7 (ICT)

Na Yang (Thai: นายาง, pronounced [nāː jāːŋ]) is a village and tambon (sub-district) of Phichai District, in Uttaradit Province, Thailand. In 2005 it had a population of 8,831 people. The tambon contains seven villages.
