= Tha Mafueang =

Coordinates: 17.2382°N 100.0567°E

Tha Mafueang ท่ามะเฟือง
- Tambon
- Interactive map of Tha Mafueang
- Country: Thailand
- Province: Uttaradit
- District: Phichai District

Population (2005)
  - Total: 5,904
- Time zone: UTC+7 (ICT)

Tha Mafueang (Thai: ท่ามะเฟือง) is a village and tambon (sub-district) of Phichai District, in Uttaradit Province, Thailand. In 2005 it had a population of 5,904 people. The tambon contains 10 villages.
