= Ban Dara =

Coordinates: 17°22′N 100°05′E

Ban Dara บ้านดารา
- Tambon
- Interactive map of Ban Dara
- Country: Thailand
- Province: Uttaradit
- District: Phichai District

Population (2005)
  - Total: 6,815
- Time zone: UTC+7 (ICT)

Ban Dara (Thai: บ้านดารา, pronounced [bâːn dāːrāː]) is a village and tambon (sub-district) of Phichai District, in Uttaradit Province, Thailand. In 2005, it had a population of 6,815 people. The tambon contains nine villages.
