= San Kamphaeng subdistrict =

Coordinates: 18°45′N 99°07′E

San Kamphaeng สันกำแพง
- Tambon
- Interactive map of San Kamphaeng
- Country: Thailand
- Province: Chiang Mai
- District: San Kamphaeng

Population (2005)
  - Total: 13,686
- Time zone: UTC+7 (ICT)

San Kamphaeng (Thai: สันกำแพง) is a tambon (subdistrict) of San Kamphaeng District, in Chiang Mai Province, Thailand. In 2005 it had a population of 13,686 people. The tambon contains 14 villages.

== Administration ==
The subdistrict is split into two local administrations: San Kamphaeng town covers the urban centre of San Kamphaeng Subdistrict and parts of Chae Chang Subdistrict, and the remaining part of the subdistrict forms the San Kamphaeng Subdistrict Administrative Organization.
