= Lopburi mall shooting =

2020 mass shooting and robbery in Thailand

Coordinates: 14°46′31.1″N 100°41′37.4″E

- First responders at the scene of the shooting
- Location: Robinson Shopping Centre, Mueang Lopburi district, Lopburi, Thailand
- Date: 9 January 2020 c. 8:44 p.m. (UTC+7)
- Attack type: Armed robbery, mass shooting
- Weapon: Suppressed 9mm CZ SP-01 semi-automatic pistol
- Deaths: 3
- Injuries: 4
- Perpetrator: Prasittichai Khaokaew
- Verdict: Pleaded guilty, sentenced to death
- Convictions: Murder (x3); Attempted murder (x4); Robbery

On 9 January 2020, a mass shooting and robbery occurred at the Robinson Shopping Centre in the Lopburi province of Thailand. The gunman, Prasittichai Khaokaew, used a Suppressed 9mm CZ SP-01 semi-automatic pistol to shoot seven people, killing three of them. He then stole ฿500,000 worth of gold jewellery before fleeing on a motorcycle. Khaokaew was arrested 13 days later on 22 January after being turned in by his wife. While in custody, he confessed to committing the robbery and shooting because he was in debt and wanted to make his life more exciting. He later pleaded guilty and was sentenced to death.

== Events ==
Prasittichai Khaokaew, wearing a balaclava and armed with a Suppressed 9mm CZ SP-01 semi-automatic pistol, entered the Robinson Shopping Centre at 8:44 pm. Outside of the Aurora gold shop, he shot Teerachat Nimma, a 33-year-old security guard. The guard limped out of the mall and died on a road adjacent to the building. He then shot a 2-year-old boy in the head. After falling to the ground, the boy's mother carried him to safety, but he later died from his injuries in the hospital. Khaokaew then entered the gold shop, where he fatally shot Thidarat Thongthip, a 31-year-old employee, behind the counter.

Khaokaew proceeded to jump over the counter and stole three trays of gold necklaces worth ฿500,000. Before the police arrived, he fled on a red-white Yamaha Fino motorcycle with its license plate removed. The Phahon Yothin Highway, where the mall was located, was temporarily closed that night.

Four others were injured in the shooting, including a couple who were shopping for jewellery with their daughter, and a foreign tourist.

== Investigation ==
The shooting caused outrage throughout Thailand, and there was considerable public pressure to arrest the perpetrator. A ฿500,000 reward was offered for information leading to the arrest of the gunman. Sensitive information concerning the status of the investigation was leaked to the media by police officers, leading to fears that the perpetrator fled the country before he could be apprehended.

The police believed the perpetrator had experience using firearms due to his gestures during the shooting. Authorities learned that there were 13 guns matching the model of the one used during the shooting in the Sing Buri province. One of these guns belonged to the perpetrators father, a former policeman. Fingerprints and other DNA belonging to the assailant were also retrieved from the crime scene. Additionally, the shooter wore rare and expensive shoes, which were traced back to him. One week after the shooting, the perpetrator's wife gave the police a tip after she recognized the gunman's limp and the motorcycle he used.

After police learned of the shooter's identity, they collected shells from a gun range that Khaokaew frequented. Some of the shells ballistically matched those found at the crime scene. Using this evidence, police obtained a warrant for Khaokaew's arrest on the evening of 21 January 2020.

== Perpetrator ==
Prasittichai Khaokaew (born 26 December 1981) lived with his wife of three years in the Lopburi province. Khaokaew was a headmaster of a primary school in the neighboring Sing Buri province, where he earned a monthly salary of ฿30,000. Other staff at the school described him as a friendly person who easily got along with others. He reportedly lived a luxury lifestyle, which caused him to amass ฿2,000,000 in debt. He was known to police because he had previously purchased an illegally imported BMW Z4 sports car. Khaokaew was also a gun enthusiast who owned several firearms.

Khaokaew claimed to have planned the crime three days in advance. He borrowed the gun used in the crime from his father and returned it to him the day after the shooting. He also purchased the silencer for the weapon online. The motorcycle he used to flee the scene was owned by his father-in-law. He discarded the clothes he wore at the Kok Ko tambon of the Mueang Lopburi district.

Khaokaew was arrested on the morning of 22 January 2020 while driving on Highway 311 in his BMW 5 Series car. After his arrest, Khaokaew's wife went into hiding after being harassed and threatened. Khaokaew confessed to the murders, stating he committed them because he was bored with his life and wanted more excitement. However, he later retracted this statement, claiming he actually committed the crime because of his financial problems. He also stated that he dumped the gold he stole into a river. This was later proven false when investigators found the 33 gold necklaces hidden at his father's house.

=== Legal proceedings ===
Khaokaew was charged with nine offenses including premeditated murder, attempted murder, illegally discharging a firearm in a public place, and illegal possession of weapons and ammunition. After hearing the charges, he pleaded guilty on all counts. He was later sentenced to death. Despite Khaokaew claiming the murders were not planned, the court argued that the use of a silencer proved that the crime was premeditated. They also noted that he did not turn himself in. After filing an appeal on 20 July 2021, the death sentence was upheld after the court refused to reduce the Khaokaew's penalty, stating that his actions were inhumane.

== See also ==
- Crime in Thailand
- List of massacres in Thailand
- Nakhon Ratchasima shootings
