= Tha Sak =

- Tambon
- Country: Thailand
- Province: Uttaradit
- District: Phichai District

Population (2005)
  - Total: 7,323
- Time zone: UTC+7 (ICT)

Tha Sak (Thai: ท่าสัก, pronounced [tʰâː sàk]) is a village and tambon (sub-district) of Phichai District, in Uttaradit Province, Thailand. In 2005 it had a population of 7,323 people. The tambon contains 10 villages.
