= Yala Technical College =

College in Thailand

- วิทยาลัยเทคนิคยะลา
- Motto: สร้างวินัย ให้วิชา พัฒนาสังคม (Thai)
- Motto in English: Discipline Knowledge Development
- Type: Technical college
- Established: 1957
- Director: Norrachai Wutthicharoenmongkol
- Location: Yala, Thailand; 6.550524°N 101.287270°E
- Website: www.ytc.ac.th

Yala Technical College (Thai: วิทยาลัยเทคนิคยะลา) is a higher education institution in Yala, Thailand offering two year (full-time) post-secondary diplomas in information technology, computer engineering, architecture, mechanical engineering, construction engineering, rubber technology, electrical engineering, electronics engineering, automotive engineering, and business information systems. The college also offers a 2+2 years programme in technical education.
