= Kho Rum =

Coordinates: 17.2836°N 100.0697°E

Kho Rum คอรุม
- Tambon
- Interactive map of Kho Rum
- Country: Thailand
- Province: Uttaradit
- District: Phichai District

Population (2005)
  - Total: 9,632
- Time zone: UTC+7 (ICT)

Kho Rum (Thai: คอรุม, pronounced [kʰɔ̄ː rūm]) is a village and tambon (sub-district) of Phichai District, in Uttaradit Province, Thailand. In 2005 it had a population of 9,632 people. The tambon contains 12 villages.
