= Saluang subdistrict =

Coordinates: 19°01′N 98°53′E

Saluang สะลวง
- Tambon
- Interactive map of Saluang
- Country: Thailand
- Province: Chiang Mai
- District: Mae Rim

Population (2005)
  - Total: 4,731
- Time zone: UTC+7 (ICT)

Saluang Subdistrict (Thai: สะลวง) is a tambon (subdistrict) of Mae Rim District, in Chiang Mai Province, Thailand. In 2005 it had a population of 4731 people. The tambon contains eight villages.
