= Mai Kaen railway station =

Railway station in Noen Ngam, Thailand

Mai Kaen ไม้แก่น
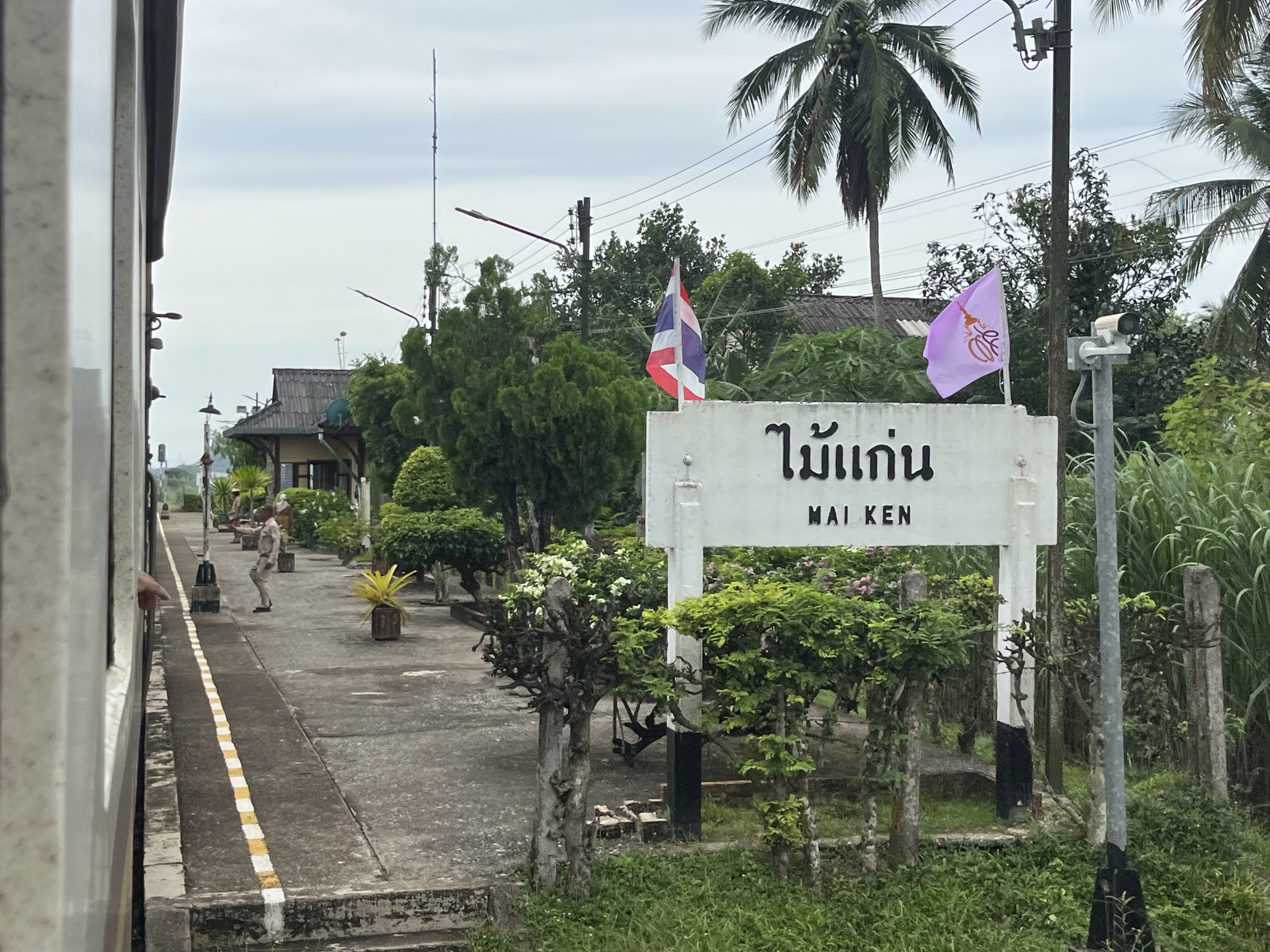

General information
- Location: Mu 2 (Ban Mai Kaen), Noen Ngam Subdistrict, Raman District, Yala
- Coordinates: 6.5116°N 101.3684°E
- Owner: State Railway of Thailand
- Line: Southern Line
- Platforms: 1
- Tracks: 2

Other information
- Station code: ไม.

Services
Preceding station	State Railway of Thailand	Following station
Yala towards Hua Lamphong or Krung Thep Aphiwat	Southern Line	Ban Patae Halt towards Su-ngai Kolok
Location

Mai Kaen railway station (Note: Station signage, including Yala and Raman adjacent stations signage, uses the spelling "Mai Ken") is a railway station located in Noen Ngam Subdistrict, Raman District, Yala. It is a class 3 railway station located 1,048.801 km (651.7 mi) from Thon Buri railway station

== Services ==
- Local No. 447/448 Surat Thani-Sungai Kolok-Surat Thani
- Local No. 451/452 Nakhon Si Thammarat-Sungai Kolok-Nakhon Si Thammarat
- Local No. 453/454 Yala-Sungai Kolok-Yala
- Local No. 463/464 Phatthalung-Sungai Kolok-Phatthalung
