= Buak Khang =

Buak Khang บวกค้าง
- Tambon
- Country: Thailand
- Province: Chiang Mai
- District: San Kamphaeng

Population (2005)
  - Total: 7,851
- Time zone: UTC+7 (ICT)

Buak Khang (Thai: บวกค้าง) is a tambon (subdistrict) of San Kamphaeng District, in Chiang Mai Province, Thailand. In 2005, it had a population of 7,851 people. The tambon contains 13 villages.
