= Yaha district =

Yaha ยะหา
- District
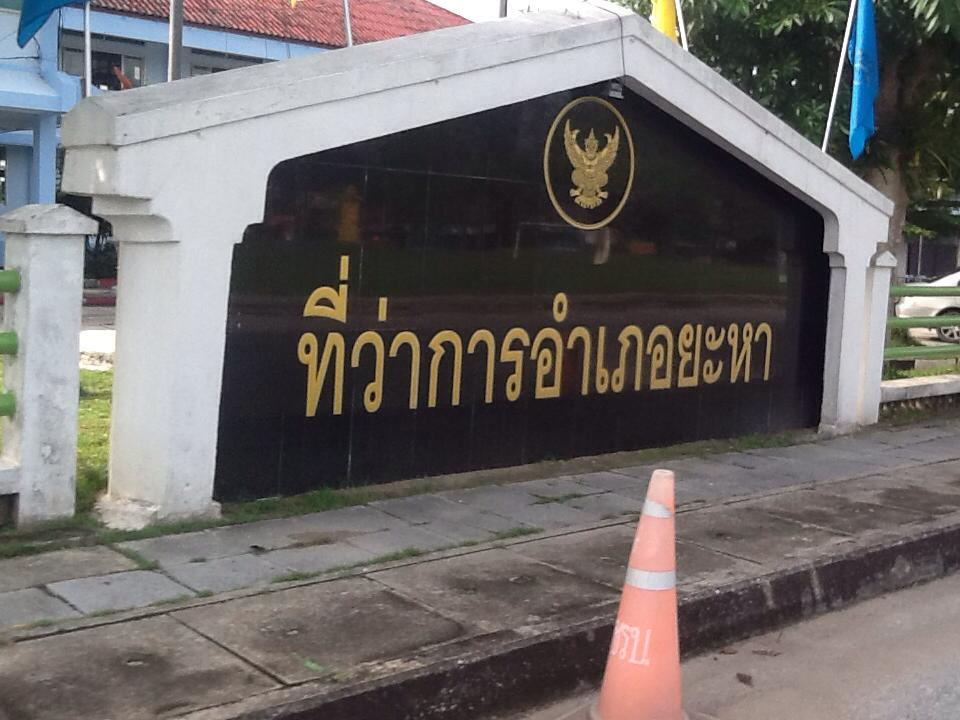
- Yaha District Office

- District location in Yala province
- Coordinates: 6°28′42″N 101°8′6″E
- Country: Thailand
- Province: Yala
- Subdistricts: 7
- Mubans: 49

Area
  - Total: 500.0 km^{2} (193.1 sq mi)

Population (2014)
  - Total: 60,091
  - Density: 103.1/km^{2} (267/sq mi)
- Time zone: UTC+7 (ICT)
- Postal code: 95120
- Geocode: 9505

Yaha (Thai: ยะหา, pronounced [já(ʔ).hǎː]; Pattani Malay: ยาฮา, pronounced [jāː.hāː]) is a district (amphoe) in the western part of Yala province, southern Thailand.

== History ==
Yaha was separated from Mueang Yala to create the district in 1907.

== Geography ==
Neighboring districts are (from the west clockwise): Kabang of Yala province; Saba Yoi of Songkhla province; Mueang Yala, Krong Pinang, and Bannang Sata of Yala province; and Kedah state of Malaysia.

== Administration ==
=== Central administration ===
Yaha is divided into seven sub-districts (tambons), which are further subdivided into 49 administrative villages (mubans).

| No. | Name | Thai | Villages | Pop. |
|---|---|---|---|---|
| 1. | Yaha | ยะหา | 9 | 14,837 |
| 2. | La-ae | ละแอ | 6 | 4,412 |
| 3. | Patae | ปะแต | 9 | 12,898 |
| 4. | Baro | บาโร๊ะ | 8 | 9,756 |
| 6. | Tachi | ตาชี | 5 | 2,080 |
| 7. | Ba-ngoi Sinae | บาโงยซิแน | 6 | 7,823 |
| 8. | Katong | กาตอง | 6 | 8,285 |

Numbers 5 and 9 belong to the tambons which now form Kabang District.

=== Local administration ===
There are two sub-district municipalities (thesaban tambons) in the district:

- Yaha (Thai: เทศบาลตำบลยะหา) consisting of parts of sub-district Yaha.
- Patae (Thai: เทศบาลตำบลปะแต) consisting of sub-district Patae.

There are six sub-district administrative organizations (SAO) in the district:

- Yaha (Thai: องค์การบริหารส่วนตำบลยะหา) consisting of parts of sub-district Yaha.
- La-ae (Thai: องค์การบริหารส่วนตำบลละแอ) consisting of sub-district La-ae.
- Baro (Thai: องค์การบริหารส่วนตำบลบาโร๊ะ) consisting of sub-district Baro.
- Tachi (Thai: องค์การบริหารส่วนตำบลตาชี) consisting of sub-district Tachi.
- Ba-ngoi Sinae (Thai: องค์การบริหารส่วนตำบลบาโงยซิแน) consisting of sub-district Ba-ngoi Sinae.
- Katong (Thai: องค์การบริหารส่วนตำบลกาตอง) consisting of sub-district Katong.
