= Ban Khon =

Ban Khon บ้านโคน
- Tambon
- Interactive map of Ban Khon
- Coordinates: 17.206597°N 100.093476°E
- Country: Thailand
- Province: Uttaradit
- District: Phichai District

Population (2005)
  - Total: 5,297
- Time zone: UTC+7 (ICT)

Ban Khon (Thai: บ้านโคน, pronounced [bâːn kʰōːn]) is a village and tambon (sub-district) of Phichai District, in Uttaradit Province, Thailand. In 2005, it had a population of 5,297 people. The tambon contains eight villages.
