= Pong Yaeng =

Coordinates: 18°53′N 98°49′E

Pong Yaeng โป่งแยง
- Tambon
- Interactive map of Pong Yaeng
- Country: Thailand
- Province: Chiang Mai
- District: Mae Rim

Population (2005)
  - Total: 9,922
- Time zone: UTC+7 (ICT)

Pong Yaeng (Thai: โป่งแยง) is a tambon (subdistrict) of Mae Rim District, in Chiang Mai Province, Thailand. In 2005, it had a population of 9,922 people. The tambon contains nine villages.
