= 2007 Songkhla bombings =

Terrorist incident in Thailand

- Location: Songkhla Province, Thailand
- Date: 27 and 28 May 2007; 09:00 – 16:00 (UTC+7)
- Target: JB Hat Yai Hotel, Hat Yai Garden Hotel and a Saba Yoi market
- Attack type: multiple bombings
- Deaths: 4
- Injuries: 36
- Perpetrator: possibly Pattani insurgents

The 2007 Songkhla bombings took place in Songkhla Province, Thailand on 27 and 28 May 2007, and are believed to be part of the ongoing south Thailand insurgency. At least four people were killed and 36 were injured.

The explosions started in Hat Yai when a string of seven bomb blasts that injured 13 people in Hat Yai. Most of the bombs were hidden in garbage bins and detonated nearly at the same time starting at 21:00. But one bomb was hurled into JB Hat Yai Hotel and another exploded in front of Hat Yai Garden Hotel.

The following day, a bomb exploded in front of a busy market in the Saba Yoi. The bomb, which exploded shortly after 16:00, was hidden in a motorcycle parked in front of the market next to a railway station. The motorcycle was destroyed by the blast, and a nearby car damaged, as were dozens of stalls belonging to fruit and vegetable vendors. The bombs were the first terrorist attacks in Songkhla since the south Thailand insurgency reignited in November 2004.
