= Kabang district =

Kabang กาบัง
- District
- District location in Yala province
- Coordinates: 6°25′39″N 101°1′9″E
- Country: Thailand
- Province: Yala
- Seat: Kabang
- Subdistricts: 2
- Mubans: 19
- District established: 1991

Area
  - Total: 451.0 km^{2} (174.1 sq mi)

Population (2014)
  - Total: 23,226
  - Density: 39.3/km^{2} (102/sq mi)
- Time zone: UTC+7 (ICT)
- Postal code: 95120
- Geocode: 9507

Kabang (Thai: กาบัง, pronounced [kāː.bāŋ]; Pattani Malay: กาแบ, pronounced [kāː.bɛː]) is the westernmost district (amphoe) of Yala province, southern Thailand.

== History ==
The name Kabang is a Thai corruption of kabae or kabe (Jawi: كاب), its original name in Patani Malay language. Kabae or kabe is a kind of Rambutan tree.

The area of Kabang district was separated from Yaha district to create a minor district (king amphoe) on 1 April 1991. It was upgraded to a full district on 11 October 1997.

== Geography ==
Neighboring districts are (from the northwest clockwise): Saba Yoi of Songkhla province; Yaha of Yala province; and Kedah state of Malaysia.

== Administration ==
=== Central administration ===
Kabang is divided into two sub-districts (tambons), which are further subdivided into 19 administrative villages (mubans).

No.	Name	Thai	Villages	Pop.
1.	Kabang	กาบัง	8	13,626
2.	Bala	บาละ	11	9,600

=== Local administration ===
There are two sub-district administrative organizations (SAO) in the district:

- Kabang (Thai: องค์การบริหารส่วนตำบลกาบัง) consisting of sub-district Kabang.
- Bala (Thai: องค์การบริหารส่วนตำบลบาละ) consisting of sub-district Bala.
