= Mae Pu Kha =

Mae Pu Kha แม่ปูคา
- Tambon
- Country: Thailand
- Province: Chiang Mai
- District: San Kamphaeng

Population (2005)
  - Total: 5,969
- Time zone: UTC+7 (ICT)

Mae Pu Kha (Thai: แม่ปูคา) is a tambon (subdistrict) of San Kamphaeng District, in Chiang Mai Province, Thailand. In 2005 it had a population of 5,969 people. The tambon contains nine villages.

== Water quality ==
San Kamphaeng District, where Mae Pu Ka is located, is an area where the groundwater contains high levels of fluoride up to 4.8–15 mg/L. Studies found that residents' urinary fluoride levels were elevated and that the highest risk of fluoride ingestion comes from cooking rice with fluoride-containing water because of a lack of knowledge on fluoride sources and fluoride chemistry.

In Mae Pu Kha Subdistrict, it was observed that the village waterworks had been completed and piped water was available to most, if not all of its households. Although residents have also dug wells in their compounds, these have generally been abandoned due to poor water quality and concerns over airborne pollution.

A study also reported that many rural villagers have been informed of the risks of fluorosis from drinking high-fluoride water through outreach programmes conducted by public health workers and community ambassadors. This is also evident at the Mae Pu Kha District where villagers respond by consuming bottled drinking water instead of piped water and groundwater from wells. The municipality-managed public water plant provides free drinking water to registered households on a quota-basis.
