= Sateng Nok =

Sateng Nok สะเตงนอก
- Subdistrict
- Interactive map of Sateng Nok
- Country: Thailand
- Province: Yala
- District: Mueang Yala

Population (2017)
  - Total: 31,725
- Time zone: UTC+7 (ICT)
- Postal code: 95000
- TIS 1099: 950116

Sateng Nok (Thai: สะเตงนอก, pronounced [sā.tēːŋ nɔ̂ːk]) is a tambon (sub-district) of Mueang Yala District, in Yala Province, Thailand. In 2017 it had a population of 31,725 persons.

Sateng Nok lies on the border with Pattani Province in the north of Yala Province. It sits astride Route 4082 off Route 4106, south of Khao Tum and north of Krong Pinang District. The Yala Railway runs through the centre of the urban area. The Tham Phab Khien Fa Panang Caves lie to the east of Sateng on the way to Budi. They contain some 500-year-old rock paintings. The area was flooded in November–December 2011 and several people lost their lives.

== Administration ==
=== Central administration ===
The tambon is divided into 13 administrative villages (mubans).

No.	Name	Thai
1.	Ban Boe Seng	บ้านเบอร์เส้ง
2.	Ban Malayu Bang Kok	บ้านมลายูบางกอก
3.	Ban Pao Yani	บ้านเปาะยานิ
4.	Ban Nat To Mong	บ้านนัดโต๊ะโมง
5.	Ban Ba-ngoi Badae	บ้านบาโงยบาแด
6.	Ban Phong Bulo	บ้านพงบูโล๊ะ
7.	Ban Nibong Baru	บ้านนิบงบารู
8.	Ban Kampong Buke	บ้านกำปงบูเก๊ะ
9.	Ban Kuelaema	บ้านกือแลมะห์
10.	Ban Tue Bo	บ้านตือเบาะ
11.	Ban Kampong Tue Ngao	บ้านกำปงตือเงาะ
12.	Ban Lacho	บ้านลาโจ๊ะ
13.	Ban Prama	บ้านปรามะ

=== Local administration ===
The area of the sub-district is covered by the town (thesaban mueang) Sateng Nok (เทศบาลเมืองสะเตงนอก).
