= Khilek, Mae Rim =

Coordinates: 18.9919°N 98.9450°E

Khilek ขี้เหล็ก
- Tambon
- Interactive map of Khilek
- Country: Thailand
- Province: Chiang Mai
- District: Mae Rim

Population (2014)
  - Total: 7,476
- Time zone: UTC+7 (ICT)
- Postal code: 50180
- TIS 1099: 500704

Khilek, Mae Rim (Thai: ขี้เหล็ก) is a tambon (subdistrict) of Mae Rim District, in Chiang Mai Province, Thailand. In 2014 it had a population of 7,476 people.

== Administration ==
=== Central administration ===
The tambon is divided into eight administrative villages (mubans).

No.	Name	Thai
1.	Ban Khilek Noi	บ้านขี้เหล็กน้อย
2.	Ban San Khayom	บ้านสันคะยอม
3.	Ban Huai Nam Rin	บ้านห้วยน้ำริน
4.	Ban Sang	บ้านซาง
5.	Ban Ton Kham	บ้านต้นขาม
6.	Ban Khilek Luang	บ้านขี้เหล็กหลวง
7.	Ban Pak Thang Sa Suang	บ้านปากทางสลวง
8.	Ban Phana Wan	บ้านพนาวัลย์

=== Local administration ===
The area of the subdistrict is covered by the subdistrict municipality (thesaban tambon) Khilek (เทศบาลตำบลขี้เหล็ก)
