= Rim Nuea =

Coordinates: 18.9334°N 98.9404°E

Rim Nuea ริมเหนือ
- Tambon
- Interactive map of Rim Nuea
- Country: Thailand
- Province: Chiang Mai
- District: Mae Rim

Population (2005)
  - Total: 3,336
- Time zone: UTC+7 (ICT)

Rim Nuea (Thai: ริมเหนือ) is a tambon (subdistrict) of Mae Rim District, in Chiang Mai Province, Thailand. In 2005 it had a population of 3,336 people. The tambon contains four villages.
