= Rim Tai =

Rim Tai ริมใต้
- Tambon
- Interactive map of Rim Tai
- Coordinates: 18°54′59″N 98°57′38″E
- Country: Thailand
- Province: Chiang Mai
- Amphoe: Mae Rim

Population (2020)
  - Total: 8,566
- Time zone: UTC+7 (TST)
- Postal code: 50180
- TIS 1099: 500701

Rim Tai (Thai: ริมใต้) is a tambon (subdistrict) of Mae Rim District, in Chiang Mai Province, Thailand. In 2020 it had a total population of 8,566 people.

== Administration ==
=== Central administration ===
The tambon is subdivided into 8 administrative villages (muban).

| No. | Name | Thai |
|---|---|---|
| 1. | Ban Muen Thoi - Nam Ngam | บ้านหมื่นถ้อย-น้ำงาม |
| 2. | Ban Duang Di | บ้านดวงดี |
| 3. | Ban Khon Tan | บ้านขอนตาล |
| 4. | Ban Ton Kaeo | บ้านต้นแก้ว |
| 5. | Ban Tha Wang | บ้านท่าวัง |
| 6. | Ban Huai Cho | บ้านห้วยโจ้ |
| 7. | Ban Thung Hua Chang | บ้านทุ่งหัวช้าง |
| 8. | Ban Sai Mun | บ้านทรายมูล |

=== Local administration ===
The whole area of the subdistrict is covered by the subdistrict municipality (Thesaban Tambon) Mae Rim (เทศบาลตำบลแม่ริม).
