= Huai Sai, Mae Rim =

Huai Sai ห้วยทราย
- Tambon
- Interactive map of Huai Sai
- Coordinates: 18°57′37″N 98°55′01″E
- Country: Thailand
- Province: Chiang Mai
- Amphoe: Mae Rim

Population (2020)
  - Total: 4,789
- Time zone: UTC+7 (TST)
- Postal code: 50180
- TIS 1099: 500706

Huai Sai (Thai: ห้วยทราย) is a tambon (subdistrict) of Mae Rim District, in Chiang Mai Province, Thailand. In 2020, it had a total population of 4,789 people.

== Administration ==
=== Central administration ===
The tambon is subdivided into 5 administrative villages (muban).

No.	Name	Thai
1.	Ban Oi	บ้านอ้อย
2.	Ban Nong Pla Man	บ้านหนองปลามัน
3.	Ban Huai Sai	บ้านห้วยทราย
4.	Ban Mae Aen	บ้านแม่แอน
5.	Ban Hua Fai	บ้านหัวฝาย

=== Local administration ===
The whole area of the subdistrict is covered by the subdistrict administrative organization (SAO) Huai Sai (องค์การบริหารส่วนตำบลห้วยทราย).
