= Mae Raem =

Coordinates: 18.9201°N 98.9176°E

- Tambon
- Interactive map of Mae Raem
- Country: Thailand
- Province: Chiang Mai
- District: Mae Rim

Population (2005)
  - Total: 8,264
- Time zone: UTC+7 (ICT)

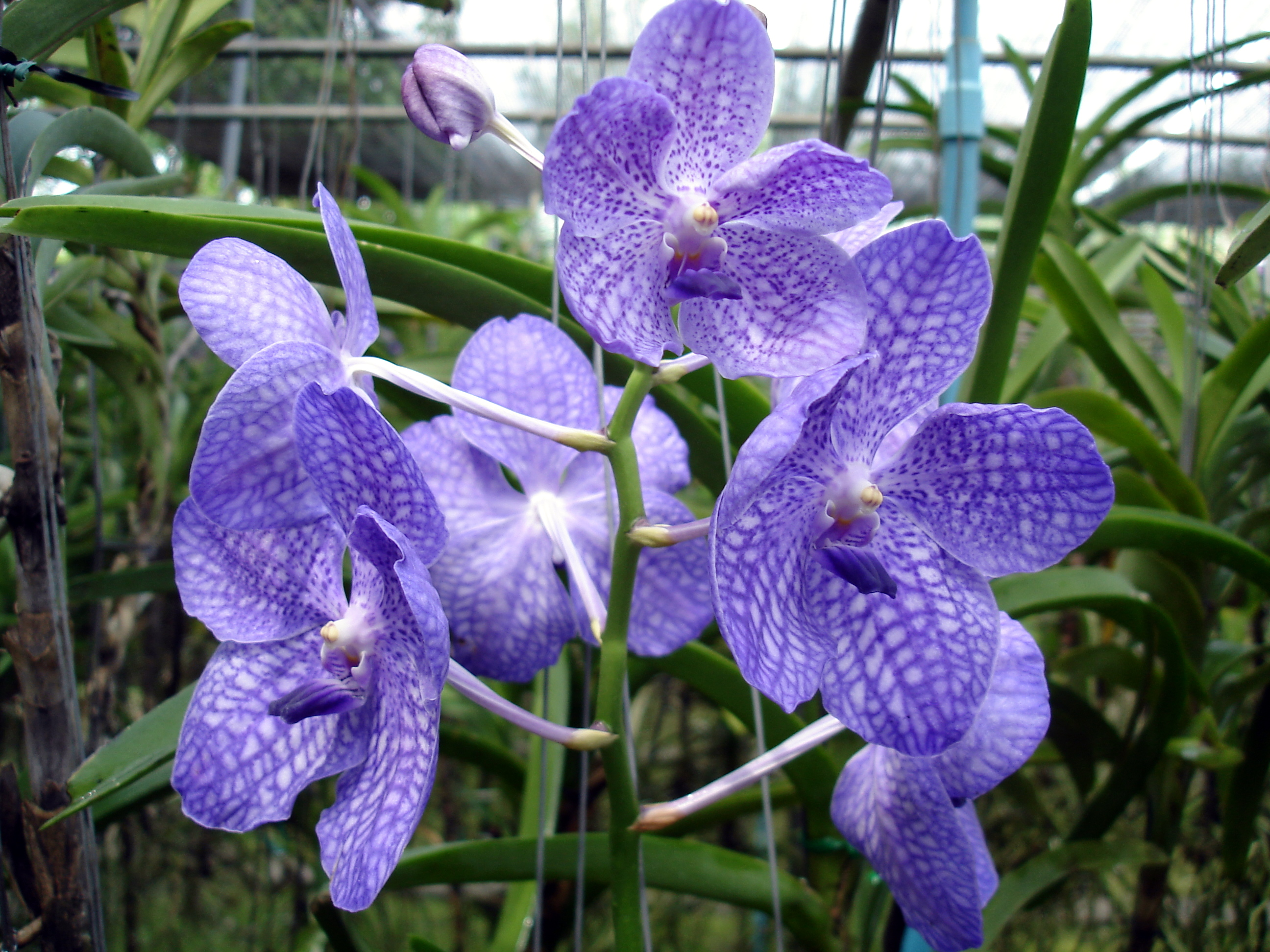
Mae Ram Orchid and Butterfly Farm, Mae Raem

Mae Raem (Thai: แม่แรม) is a tambon (subdistrict) of Mae Rim District, in Chiang Mai Province, Thailand. In 2005 it had a population of 8,264. The tambon contains 12 villages.
