= Or Tor Kor Market shooting =

Mass shooting in Bangkok, Thailand

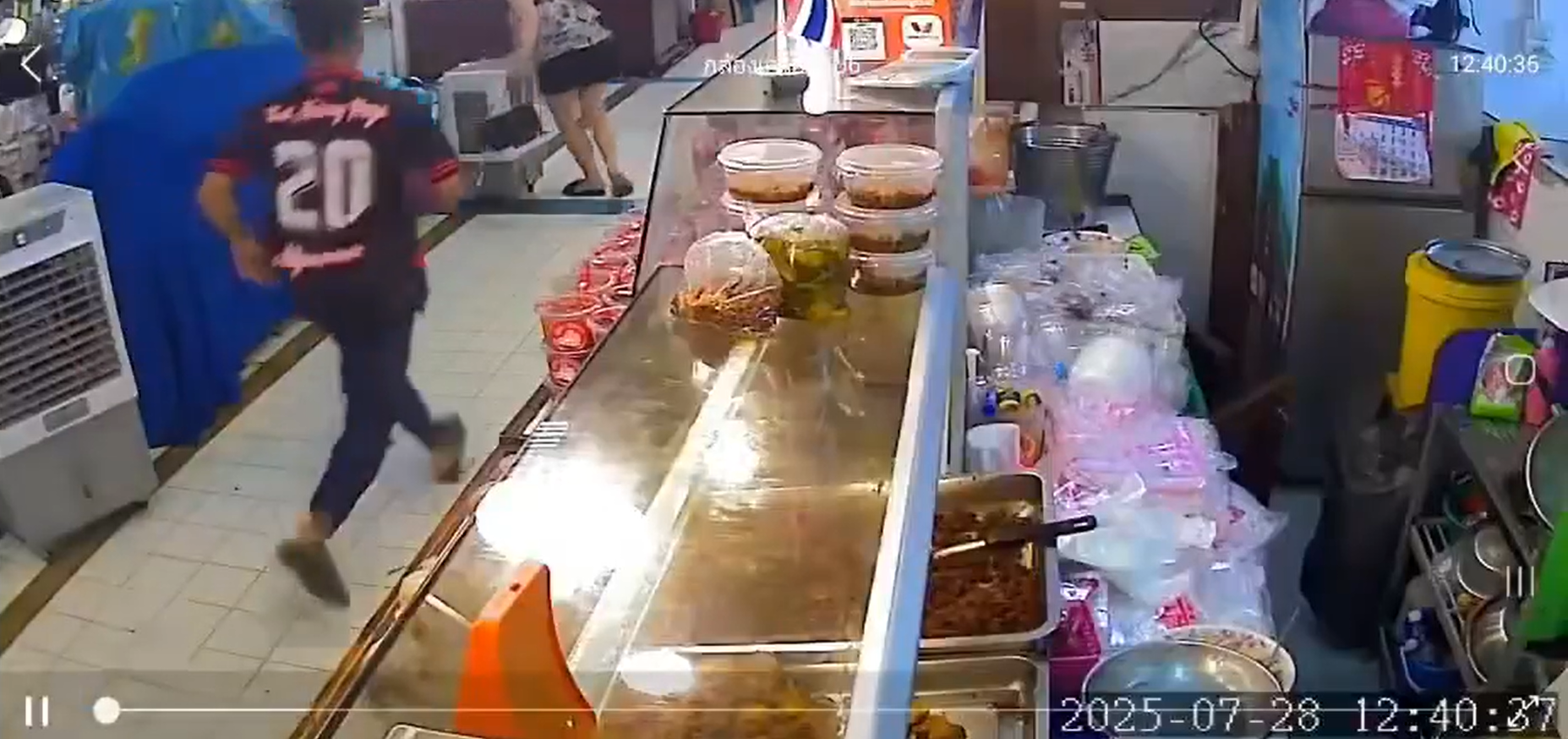
- CCTV still of people fleeing the market during the shooting
- Location: 13°47′50″N 100°32′51″E; Or Tor Kor Market, Bangkok, Thailand
- Date: 28 July 2025; 12:31 p.m. (ICT, UTC+7)
- Target: Security guards
- Attack type: Mass shooting; mass murder; murder-suicide
- Weapon: 9mm CZ Shadow 2 semi-automatic pistol
- Deaths: 6 (including the perpetrator)
- Injuries: 2
- Perpetrator: Noi Praidaen
- Motive: Conflict with a security guard

On 28 July 2025, at 12:31 ICT (UTC+7), a mass shooting occurred at the Or Tor Kor Market (Thai: ตลาด อ.ต.ก., RTGS: O To Ko) in Bangkok, Thailand.

A gunman opened fire on people at the market near a donation center, killing four security guards and a vendor and injuring two women. The gunman died of a self-inflicted gunshot wound.

== Background ==
Gun ownership rates in Thailand are relatively high for Southeast Asia. Thailand has the highest civilian gun ownership rate in Southeast Asia. Specifically, it has a rate of 15.1 guns per 100 people. Estimates put the number civilian gun owners in the country at more than 10.34 million, while only 6.22 million guns are legally registered. Thailand also has the highest number of gun homicides in Southeast Asia, almost 50 percent more gun homicides than the Philippines. While Thailand has fairly restrictive laws on gun ownership, gun violence is not unusual and the nation has experienced several deadly mass shootings in recent years.

Or Tor Kor Market is a large fresh market in Bangkok's Bang Sue district and is located opposite to the Chatuchak Weekend Market.

On 26 July 2025, Kanthat Pongpaiboonwet opened a donation center for supplies and dried food at the Or Tor Kor Market to send to evacuation centers, as well as to soldiers and police officers on duty during the border clashes between Thailand and Cambodia.

== Incident ==
The perpetrator hijacked a taxi near SC Park, forcing the driver at gunpoint to drive him to Or Tor Kor Market. They parked near Gate 1 at the market, where the perpetrator exited the vehicle and opened fire on security guards, killing three of them at approximately 12:31 ICT.

After shooting the guards, the perpetrator entered a building to find a security guard named "Mr. Nan" who he had an ongoing conflict with after a 2020 incident. When he found Mr. Nan, the perpetrator shot him multiple times, killing him. He then started to chase and shoot at other security guards from the building into the market, causing the death of one market vendor and injuring two women.

The perpetrator proceeded to sit down on a bench and take his own life via a self-inflicted gunshot wound.

== Victims ==
Six people (including the perpetrator) were killed and two others were injured. The first three security guards killed in the attack were Mr. Wicha Saengdee (age 55), Mr. Preecha Chaiya (age 44) and Mr. Somsak Thetsatomya (age 51). The next fatality and the intended target was Mr. Anan Panchuen (age 55), followed by a vendor Ms. Charoenyanan Satyathanaroj (age 64) and the perpetrator.

The two injured vendors were taken to Phyathai 2 International Hospital.

== Perpetrator ==
The perpetrator was identified as Noi Praidaen (Thai: น้อย ไปรแดน), a 61-year-old resident of Khong district, Nakhon Ratchasima. Praidaen was a former employee of the market and had an ongoing conflict with a security guard named "Mr. Nan" at the market after an incident in 2020 in which he dropped off his wife to sell dried food at the market and parked his car there. Nan was then accused of slashing the vehicle. Praidaen's family claimed he had "no known history of violence" and were "unaware of any recent tensions".

== See also ==
- Crime in Thailand
- List of massacres in Thailand
