= Huai Sai, San Kamphaeng =

Huai Sai ห้วยทราย
- Tambon
- Interactive map of Huai Sai
- Coordinates: 18°46′40″N 99°11′00″E
- Country: Thailand
- Province: Chiang Mai
- Amphoe: San Kamphaeng

Population (2020)
  - Total: 5,964
- Time zone: UTC+7 (TST)
- Postal code: 50130
- TIS 1099: 501311

Huai Sai (Thai: ห้วยทราย) is a tambon (subdistrict) of San Kamphaeng District, in Chiang Mai Province, Thailand. In 2020, it had a total population of 5,964 people.

== Administration ==
=== Central administration ===
The tambon is subdivided into 8 administrative villages (muban).

No.	Name	Thai
1.	Ban Mae Tat	บ้านแม่ตาด
2.	Ban Nong Sae	บ้านหนองแสะ
3.	Ban Lan Tong	บ้านล้านตอง
4.	Ban San Khao Khaep	บ้านสันเข้าแคบ
5.	Ban Mo	บ้านหม้อ
6.	Ban Doi Sio	บ้านดอยซิว
7.	Ban Pa Tueng	บ้านป่าตึง
8.	Ban Pha Chuk	บ้านผาจุก

=== Local administration ===
The whole area of the subdistrict is covered by the subdistrict municipality (Thesaban Tambon) Huai Sai (เทศบาลตำบลห้วยทราย).
