= Ban Mo, Uttaradit =

Ban Mo
- Tambon
- Country: Thailand
- Province: Uttaradit
- District: Phichai District

Population (2005)
  - Total: 5,946
- Time zone: UTC+7 (ICT)

Ban Mo (Thai: บ้านหม้อ, pronounced [bâːn mɔ̂ː]) is a village and tambon (sub-district) of Phichai District, in Uttaradit Province, Thailand. In 2005 it had a population of 5,946 people. The tambon contains eight villages.
