= Rong Wua Daeng =

Coordinates: 18.7417°N 99.1700°E

Rong Wua Daeng ร้องวัวแดง
- Tambon
- Interactive map of Rong Wua Daeng
- Country: Thailand
- Province: Chiang Mai
- District: San Kamphaeng

Population (2005)
  - Total: 5,718
- Time zone: UTC+7 (ICT)

Rong Wua Daeng (Thai: ร้องวัวแดง) is a tambon (subdistrict) of San Kamphaeng District, in Chiang Mai Province, Thailand. In 2005 it had a population of 5,718 people. The tambon contains 11 villages.
