= Sai Mun, Chiang Mai =

Sai Mun ทรายมูล
- Tambon
- Country: Thailand
- Province: Chiang Mai
- District: San Kamphaeng

Population (2005)
  - Total: 4,230
- Time zone: UTC+7 (ICT)

Sai Mun (Thai: ทรายมูล) is a tambon (subdistrict) of San Kamphaeng District, in Chiang Mai Province, Thailand. In 2005 it had a population of 4,230 people. The tambon contains seven villages.
