= Yupo subdistrict =

Yupo ยุโป
- Tambon
- Interactive map of Yupo
- Country: Thailand
- Province: Yala
- Amphoe: Mueang Yala

Population (2017)
  - Total: 6,932
- Time zone: UTC+7 (TST)
- Postal code: 95000
- TIS 1099: 950103

Yupo (Thai: ยุโป, pronounced [júʔ.pōː]) is a tambon (subdistrict) of Mueang Yala District, in Yala Province, Thailand. In 2017 it had a total population of 6,932 people.

== Administration ==
=== Central administration ===
The tambon is subdivided into 6 administrative villages (muban).

No.	Name	Thai
1.	Ban Yupo	บ้านยุโป
2.	Ban Thung Riang	บ้านทุ่งเหรี่ยง
3.	Ban Bado	บ้านบาโด
4.	Ban Thung Yamu	บ้านทุ่งยามู
5.	Ban Khlong Sai Nai	บ้านคลองทรายใน
6.	Ban Bo Chet Suk	บ้านบ่อเจ็ดลูก

=== Local administration ===
The whole area of the subdistrict is covered by the subdistrict municipality (Thesaban Tambon) Yupo (เทศบาลตำบลยุโป).
