= Khlong Sai railway station (Pattani) =

Railway station in Mae Lan, Thailand

Khlong Sai คลองทราย
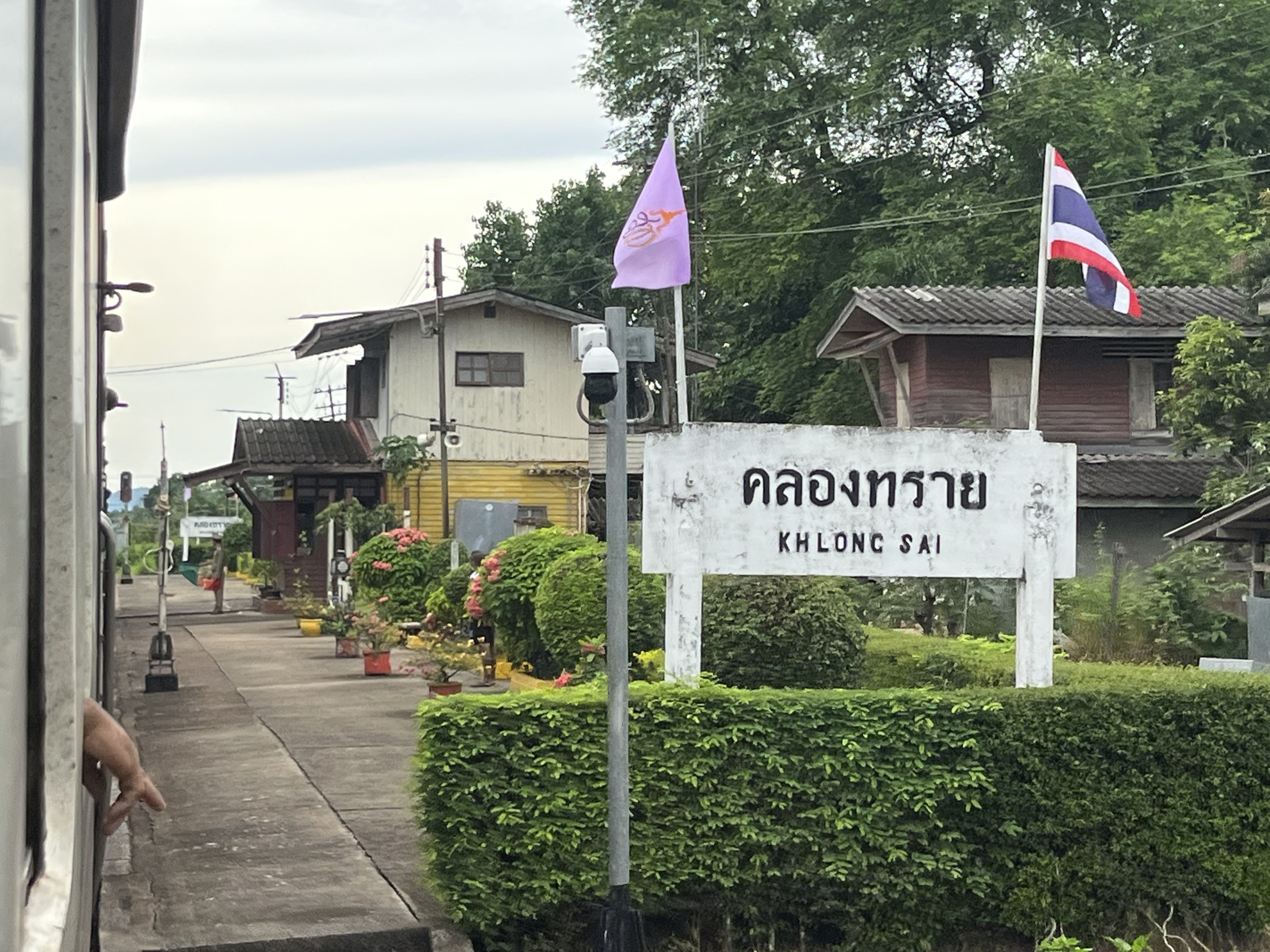

General information
- Location: Mu 5 (Ban Khlong Sai), Mae Lan Subdistrict, Mae Lan District, Pattani
- Coordinates: 6.6445°N 101.2185°E
- Owner: State Railway of Thailand
- Line: Southern Line
- Platforms: 1
- Tracks: 2

Other information
- Station code: คซ.

Services
Preceding station	State Railway of Thailand	Following station
Pa Rai Halt towards Hua Lamphong or Krung Thep Aphiwat	Southern Line	Tase towards Su-ngai Kolok
Location

Khlong Sai railway station is a railway station located in Mae Lan Subdistrict, Mae Lan District, Pattani. It is a class 3 railway station located 1,026.07 km (637.6 mi) from Thon Buri railway station. It is the only station located in Mae Lan district after its formation in 1995.

== Services ==
- Local No. 447/448 Surat Thani-Sungai Kolok-Surat Thani
- Local No. 451/452 Nakhon Si Thammarat-Sungai Kolok-Nakhon Si Thammarat
- Local No. 455/456 Nakhon Si Thammarat-Yala-Nakhon Si Thammarat
- Local No. 463/464 Phatthalung-Sungai Kolok-Phatthalung
