= Mueang Kaeo =

Coordinates: 18.8960°N 98.9761°E

Mueang Kaeo เหมืองแก้ว
- Tambon
- Interactive map of Mueang Kaeo
- Country: Thailand
- Province: Chiang Mai
- District: Mae Rim

Population (2005)
  - Total: 5,423
- Time zone: UTC+7 (ICT)

Mueang Kaeo (Thai: เหมืองแก้ว) is a tambon (subdistrict) of Mae Rim District, in Chiang Mai Province, Thailand. In 2005 it had a population of 5,423 people. The tambon contains nine villages.
