= Chae Chang =

Chae Chang แช่ช้าง
- Tambon
- Country: Thailand
- Province: Chiang Mai
- District: San Kamphaeng

Population (2005)
  - Total: 7,585
- Time zone: UTC+7 (ICT)

Chae Chang (Thai: แช่ช้าง) is a tambon (subdistrict) of San Kamphaeng District, in Chiang Mai Province, Thailand. In 2005, it had a population of 7,585 people. The tambon contains nine villages.
