= Phaya Maen =

Coordinates: 17.1879°N 100.0593°E

Phaya Maen พญาแมน
- Tambon
- Interactive map of Phaya Maen
- Country: Thailand
- Province: Uttaradit
- District: Phichai District

Population (2005)
  - Total: 6,350
- Time zone: UTC+7 (ICT)

Phaya Maen (Thai: พญาแมน, pronounced [pʰā.jāː mɛ̄ːn]) is a village and tambon (sub-district) of Phichai District, in Uttaradit Province, Thailand. In 2005 it had a population of 6,350 people. The tambon contains seven villages.
