= Nai Mueang, Uttaradit =

Nai Mueang
- Tambon
- Country: Thailand
- Province: Uttaradit
- District: Phichai District

Population (2005)
  - Total: 8,763
- Time zone: UTC+7 (ICT)

Nai Mueang (Thai: ในเมือง, pronounced [nāj mɯ̄a̯ŋ]) is a small town and tambon (sub-district) of Phichai District, in Uttaradit Province, Thailand. In 2005 it had a population of 8,763 people. The tambon contains eight villages.
