= Rai Oi =

Rai Oi ไร่อ้อย
- Tambon
- Country: Thailand
- Province: Uttaradit
- District: Phichai District

Population (2005)
  - Total: 6,924
- Time zone: UTC+7 (ICT)

Rai Oi (Thai: ไร่อ้อย, pronounced [râj ʔɔ̂j]) is a village and tambon (sub-district) of Phichai District, in Uttaradit Province, Thailand. In 2005 it had a population of 6,924 people. The tambon contains 11 villages.
