= Saba Yoi district =

Saba Yoi สะบ้าย้อย
- District
- District location in Songkhla province
- Coordinates: 6°37′6″N 100°57′6″E
- Country: Thailand
- Province: Songkhla

Area
  - Total: 852.81 km^{2} (329.27 sq mi)

Population (2021)
  - Total: 80,365
  - Density: 74.4/km^{2} (193/sq mi)
- Time zone: UTC+7 (ICT)
- Postal code: 90210
- Geocode: 9006

Saba Yoi (Thai: สะบ้าย้อย, pronounced [sā.bâː jɔ́ːj]; Pattani Malay: บายอ, pronounced [bāːjɔː]) is the southeasternmost district (amphoe) of Songkhla province, southern Thailand.

== Etymology ==
The name Saba Yoi is a Thai corruption of sebayu (Jawi: سبايو). Its original name means 'wind' in Malay.

== History ==
The area of Saba Yoi was administered by the Thepha district. It was upgraded to be Ba Hoi minor district (king amphoe) in 1924. In 1942 the government moved the district office to Tambon Mong and renamed the minor district Saba Yoi. It was upgraded to a full district in 1956.

== Geography ==
Neighboring districts are (from the west clockwise): Na Thawi and Thepha of Songkhla Province; Khok Pho of Pattani province; Mueang Yala, Yaha, and Kabang of Yala province. To the southwest is the state Kedah of Malaysia.

San Kala Khiri National Park is in Saba Yoi.

== Administration ==
The district is divided into nine sub-districts (tambons), which are further subdivided into 62 villages (mubans). Saba Yoi is also a sub-district municipality (thesaban tambon) which covers parts of tambon Saba Yai.

No.	Name	Thai name	Villages	Pop.
1.	Saba Yoi	สะบ้าย้อย	9	11,636
2.	Thung Pho	ทุ่งพอ	8	8,649
3.	Pian	เปียน	7	7,677
4.	Ban Not	บ้านโหนด	7	6,086
5.	Chanae	จะแหน	5	6,527
6.	Khuha	คูหา	8	7,667
7.	Khao Daeng	เขาแดง	7	6,779
8.	Bayo	บาโหย	5	3,961
9.	Than Khiri	ธารคีรี	6	4,514
