= Krong Pinang district =

Krong Pinang กรงปินัง
- District
- District location in Yala province
- Coordinates: 6°24′40″N 101°16′24″E
- Country: Thailand
- Province: Yala
- Seat: Sa-ae

Area
  - Total: 191.0 km^{2} (73.7 sq mi)

Population (2005)
  - Total: 22,411
  - Density: 117.3/km^{2} (304/sq mi)
- Time zone: UTC+7 (ICT)
- Postal code: 95000
- Geocode: 9508

Krong Pinang (Thai: กรงปินัง, pronounced [krōŋ pī.nāŋ], Malay: Kampung Pinang, Patani Malay: کمڤوڠ ڤينڠ) is a district (amphoe) of Yala province, southern Thailand, established by the Royal Decree Establishing Amphoe Krong Pinang, Changwat Yala, BE 2547 (2004), which came into force on 8 October 2004.

== Etymology ==
The name Krong Pinang is a Thai corruption of Kampung Pinang (Jawi: كمڤوڠ ڤينڠ, pronounced [kām.pōŋ.pī.nɛː]), its original Malay name means 'village of Pinang'. The word pinang means 'betel palm' or 'betel nut tree' (Areca catechu) in Malay.

== History ==
The minor district (king amphoe) Krong Pinang was established on 30 April 1994, when four tambons were split off from Mueang Yala district. It was upgraded to a full district on 8 October 2004.

== Geography ==
Neighboring districts are (from the east clockwise): Raman, Bannang Sata, Yaha, and Mueang Yala of Yala Province.

== Administration ==
The district is divided into four sub-districts (tambons), which are further subdivided into 23 villages (mubans). There are no municipal (thesaban) areas. There are four tambon administrative organizations (TAO).

No.	Name	Thai name	Villages	Pop.
1.	Krong Pinang	กรงปินัง	9	9,286
2.	Sa-e	สะเอะ	5	5,757
3.	Huai Krathing	ห้วยกระทิง	4	3,334
4.	Purong	ปุโรง	4	4,034
