= Mae Rim district =

Mae Rim แม่ริม
- District
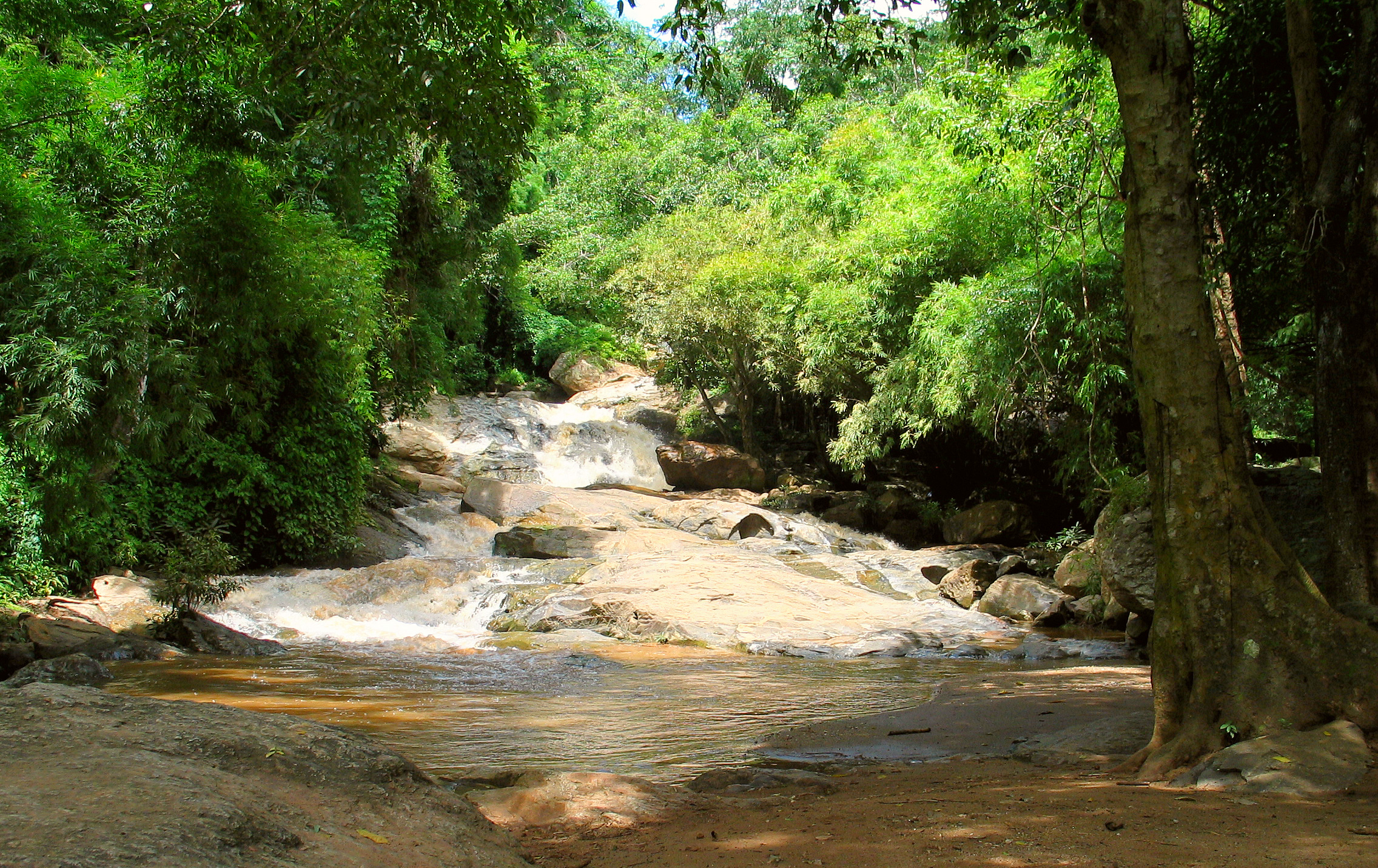
- Mae Sa Waterfall, Doi Suthep-Pui National Park

- District location in Chiang Mai province
- Coordinates: 18°54′50″N 98°56′42″E
- Country: Thailand
- Province: Chiang Mai

Area
  - Total: 443.6 km^{2} (171.3 sq mi)

Population (2005)
  - Total: 82,943
  - Density: 187/km^{2} (480/sq mi)
- Time zone: UTC+7 (ICT)
- Postal code: 50180
- Geocode: 5007

Mae Rim (Thai: แม่ริม, pronounced [mɛ̂ː rīm]; Northern Thai: ᩯᨾ᩵ᩁᩥ᩠ᨾ, pronounced [mɛ̂ː hīm]) is a district (amphoe) in the central part of Chiang Mai province in northern Thailand. It is part of the Chiang Mai Urban Area, which has a population of 1.2 million people.

== History ==
Formerly the district was called Khwaeng Mae Rim. Khwaeng Mae Rim converted to full district (amphoe) in 1914.

== Geography ==
Neighboring districts are (from the north clockwise) Mae Taeng, San Sai, Mueang Chiang Mai, Hang Dong and Samoeng of Chiang Mai Province.

== Administration ==
The district is divided into 11 subdistricts (tambons), which are further subdivided into 91 villages (mubans). Mae Rim is a township (thesaban tambon), which covers parts of tambons Rim Tai and Mae Sa. There are a further 10 tambon administrative organizations (TAO).

No.	Name	Thai name	Villages	Pop.
1.	Rim Tai	ริมใต้	8	9,498
2.	Rim Nuea	ริมเหนือ	4	3,336
3.	San Pong	สันโป่ง	11	9,425
4.	Khilek	ขี้เหล็ก	10	7,357
5.	Saluang	สะลวง	8	4,731
6.	Huai Sai	ห้วยทราย	5	4,253
7.	Mae Raem	แม่แรม	12	8,264
8.	Pong Yaeng	โป่งแยง	9	9,922
9.	Mae Sa	แม่สา	6	6,448
10.	Don Kaeo	ดอนแก้ว	10	14,286
11.	Mueang Kaeo	เหมืองแก้ว	9	5,423

== See also ==
- Doi Suthep–Pui National Park
- Queen Sirikit Botanic Garden
