= Phichai district =

Phichai พิชัย
- District
- District location in Uttaradit province
- Coordinates: 17°17′13″N 100°5′15″E
- Country: Thailand
- Province: Uttaradit

Area
  - Total: 736.7 km^{2} (284.4 sq mi)

Population (2005)
  - Total: 77,536
  - Density: 105.2/km^{2} (272/sq mi)
- Time zone: UTC+7 (ICT)
- Postal code: 53120
- Geocode: 5307

Phichai (Thai: พิชัย, pronounced [pʰí.t͡ɕʰāj]) is the southernmost district (amphoe) of Uttaradit province, northern Thailand.

== Geography ==
Neighboring districts are (from the north clockwise) Tron, Thong Saen Khan of Uttaradit Province, Wat Bot, Phrom Phiram of Phitsanulok province, Sawankhalok and Si Nakhon of Sukhothai province

== History ==
Mueang Phichai is believed to have been built in the 15th century on order of King Trailokanat as a frontier town fortified with a wall and moat. Prince Damrong Rajanubhab connected the foundation with the decline of Thung Yang, which he took for the Sukhothai-period town holding the west bank of the Nan. On his account Trailokanat raised Phichai to keep that line in its place. Phiset Jiajanphong added a physical reason. The Nan shifts course readily where it leaves the hills for the soft ground of the plain, and had moved too far from Thung Yang. Bueng Kalo east of the river and Bueng May behind Wat Phra Thaen Sila At are relict channels of it, and Chulalongkorn recorded in 1901 that above Tron the banks were collapsing and the two sides altering quickly. Phiset also raised the possibility that Thung Yang lay by then within the reach of Tilokaraj of Lan Na. However, almost no traces of this historic town survived, only the old chedi in Wat Nah Phrathat dates back to this time.

Being one of the major towns in the north for centuries, the town was moved to a new site further north in 1887, which was renamed Uttaradit in 1915. The area around the old town Phichai was reduced to a district.

== Administration ==
The district is divided into 11 sub-districts (tambon), which are further subdivided into 97 villages (muban). There are two townships (thesaban tambon), Tha Sak and Nai Mueang, both covering parts of the same-named tambon. There are a further 11 tambon administrative organizations (TAO).

No.	Name	Thai name	Villages	Pop.
1.	Nai Mueang	ในเมือง	8	8,763
2.	Ban Dara	บ้านดารา	9	6,815
3.	Rai Oi	ไร่อ้อย	11	6,924
4.	Tha Sak	ท่าสัก	10	7,323
5.	Kho Rum	คอรุม	12	9,632
6.	Ban Mo	บ้านหม้อ	8	5,946
7.	Tha Mafueang	ท่ามะเฟือง	10	5,904
8.	Ban Khon	บ้านโคน	8	5,297
9.	Phaya Maen	พญาแมน	7	6,350
10.	Na In	นาอิน	7	5,751
11.	Na Yang	นายาง	7	8,831
