= Bannang Sata (town) =

Bannang Sata บันนังสตา
- Thesaban Tambon
- Interactive map of Bannang Sata
- Coordinates: 6°15′56″N 101°15′47″E
- Country: Thailand
- Province: Yala
- Amphoe: Bannang Sata
- Time zone: UTC+7 (TST)

Bannang Sata (Thai: บันนังสตา) is the principal town of the Bannang Sata district in the Yala Province of Thailand. A subdistrict municipality (thesaban tambon), it covers parts of the subdistrict (tambon) of Bannang Sata. In 2007 it had a population of 2,856.

The municipality was created as a sanitary district (sukhaphiban) in 1956. Like all sanitary districts, it was upgraded to a subdistrict municipality in 1999.
