= San Kamphaeng district =

San Kamphaeng สันกำแพง
- District
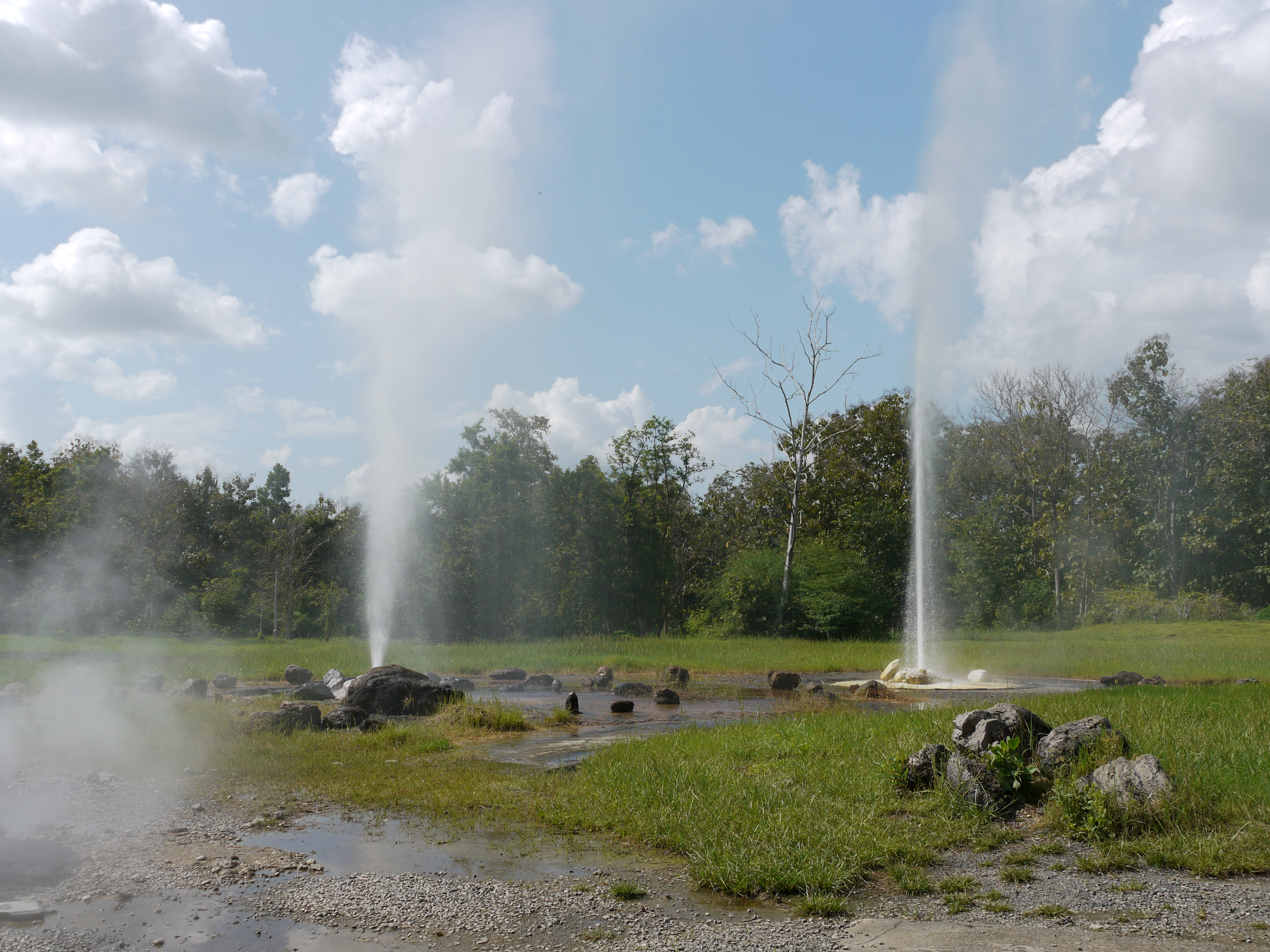
- Hot springs of San Kamphaeng

- District location in Chiang Mai province
- Coordinates: 18°44′43″N 99°7′13″E
- Country: Thailand
- Province: Chiang Mai

Area
  - Total: 197.833 km^{2} (76.384 sq mi)

Population (2005)
  - Total: 73,721
  - Density: 372.6/km^{2} (965/sq mi)
- Time zone: UTC+7 (ICT)
- Postal code: 50130
- Geocode: 5013

San Kamphaeng (Thai: สันกำแพง, pronounced [sǎn kām.pʰɛ̄ːŋ]; Northern Thai: ᩈᩢ᩠ᨶᨠᩴ᩵ᩣᩯᨻ᩠ᨦ, pronounced [sǎn kàm.pɛ̄ːŋ]) is a district (amphoe) of Chiang Mai province in northern Thailand.

== Geography ==
San Kamphaeng borders the districts (from west clockwise) Saraphi, Mueang Chiang Mai, San Sai, Doi Saket, Mae On of Chiang Mai Province and Ban Thi of Lamphun province. The area contains a large section of Hot springs with mineral baths that attracts many tourists and locals. The area also features several caves, most notable the Muang On Caves which contain Buddhist shrines. Near the cave you can find a group of monkeys - rare to see in Northern Thailand.

== History ==
The district dates back to khwaeng Mae Om, which was established in 1902. In 1923 the district was renamed San Kamphaeng.

== Administration ==
The district is divided into 10 sub-districts (tambon), which are further subdivided into 100 villages (mubans). There are two townships (thesaban tambons). San Kamphaeng covers parts of tambon San Kamphaeng and Chae Chang, and the entire tambon Sai Mun. Ton Pao covers the entire tambon of Ton Pao. There are a further eight tambon administrative organizations (TAO).

No.	Name	Thai name	Villages	Pop.
1.	San Kamphaeng	สันกำแพง	14	13,686
2.	Sai Mun	ทรายมูล	7	4,230
3.	Rong Wua Daeng	ร้องวัวแดง	11	5,718
4.	Buak Khang	บวกค้าง	13	7,851
5.	Chae Chang	แช่ช้าง	9	7,585
6.	On Tai	ออนใต้	11	5,371
10.	Mae Pu Kha	แม่ปูคา	9	5,969
11.	Huai Sai	ห้วยทราย	8	6,217
12.	Ton Pao	ต้นเปา	10	11,006
13.	San Klang	สันกลาง	8	6,088

Numbers 7–9,14,15 are tambon which now belong to Mae On district.
