= Mueang Yala district =

Mueang Yala เมืองยะลา
- District
- District location in Yala province
- Coordinates: 6°32′33″N 101°16′59″E
- Country: Thailand
- Province: Yala
- Seat: Sateng
- Subdistrictss: 14
- Mubans: 80

Area
  - Total: 258.0 km^{2} (99.6 sq mi)

Population (2014)
  - Total: 165,005
  - Density: 620.3/km^{2} (1,607/sq mi)
- Time zone: UTC+7 (ICT)
- Postal code: 95000
- Geocode: 9501

Mueang Yala (Thai: เมืองยะลา, pronounced [mɯ̄a̯ŋ já(ʔ).lāː]; Pattani Malay: ยาลอ, pronounced [jāː.lɔː]) is the capital district (amphoe mueang) of Yala province, southern Thailand.

== Geography ==
Neighboring districts are (from the north clockwise): Khok Pho, Mae Lan and Yarang of Pattani province; Raman, Krong Pinang and Yaha of Yala province; and Saba Yoi of Songkhla province.

The main river is the Pattani River, which runs through the town of Yala.

== History ==
Originally only known as Mueang district, the district was renamed Sateng in 1917 to share the name with the central sub-district. In 1938, the district was renamed Mueang Yala to conform with the common name of the central districts of a province.

Five sub-districts are scheduled to be split off to form the new district Lam Mai in 2015.

== Administration ==
=== Central administration ===
Mueang Yala is divided into 14 sub-districts (tambons), which are further subdivided into 80 administrative villages (mubans).

No.	Name	Thai	Villages	Pop.
1.	Sateng	สะเตง	-	61,250
2.	Budi	บุดี	8	10,700
3.	Yupo	ยุโป	6	6,829
4.	Lidon	ลิดล	5	5,876
6.	Yala	ยะลา	3	3,479
8.	Thasap	ท่าสาป	6	7,507
9.	Lam Mai	ลำใหม่	7	7,015
10.	Na Tham	หน้าถ้ำ	4	3,241
11.	Lam Phaya	ลำพะยา	7	5,042
12.	Poseng	เปาะเส้ง	4	5,284
14.	Phron	พร่อน	6	5,263
15.	Bannang Sareng	บันนังสาเรง	6	7,414
16.	Sateng Nok	สะเตงนอก	13	30,395
18.	Tase	ตาเซะ	5	5,710

Missing numbers are tambons which now form Krong Pinang District.

=== Local administration ===
There is one city (thesaban nakhon) in the district:

- Yala (Thai: เทศบาลนครยะลา) consisting of sub-district Sateng.

There is one town (thesaban mueang) in the district:

- Sateng Nok (Thai: เทศบาลเมืองสะเตงนอก) consisting of sub-district Sateng Nok.

There are four sub-district municipalities (thesaban tambons) in the district:

- Lam Mai (Thai: เทศบาลตำบลลำใหม่) consisting of parts of sub-district Lam Mai.
- Budi (Thai: เทศบาลตำบลบุดี) consisting of sub-district Budi.
- Yupo (Thai: เทศบาลตำบลยุโป) consisting of sub-district Yupo.
- Tha Sap (Thai: เทศบาลตำบลท่าสาป) consisting of sub-district Tha Sap.

There are nine sub-district administrative organizations (SAO) in the district:

- Lidon (Thai: องค์การบริหารส่วนตำบลลิดล) consisting of sub-district Lidon.
- Yala (Thai: องค์การบริหารส่วนตำบลยะลา) consisting of sub-district Yala.
- Lam Mai (Thai: องค์การบริหารส่วนตำบลลำใหม่) consisting of parts of sub-district Lam Mai.
- Na Tham (Thai: องค์การบริหารส่วนตำบลหน้าถ้ำ) consisting of sub-district Na Tham.
- Lam Phaya (Thai: องค์การบริหารส่วนตำบลลำพะยา) consisting of sub-district Lam Phaya.
- Po Seng (Thai: องค์การบริหารส่วนตำบลเปาะเส้ง) consisting of sub-district Po Seng.
- Phron (Thai: องค์การบริหารส่วนตำบลพร่อน) consisting of sub-district Phron.
- Bannang Sareng (Thai: องค์การบริหารส่วนตำบลบันนังสาเรง) consisting of sub-district Bannang Sareng.
- Ta Se (Thai: องค์การบริหารส่วนตำบลตาเซะ) consisting of sub-district Ta Se.
