= Highway 32 (Thailand) =

Road in Thailand

National Highway 32
- ทางหลวงแผ่นดินหมายเลข 32
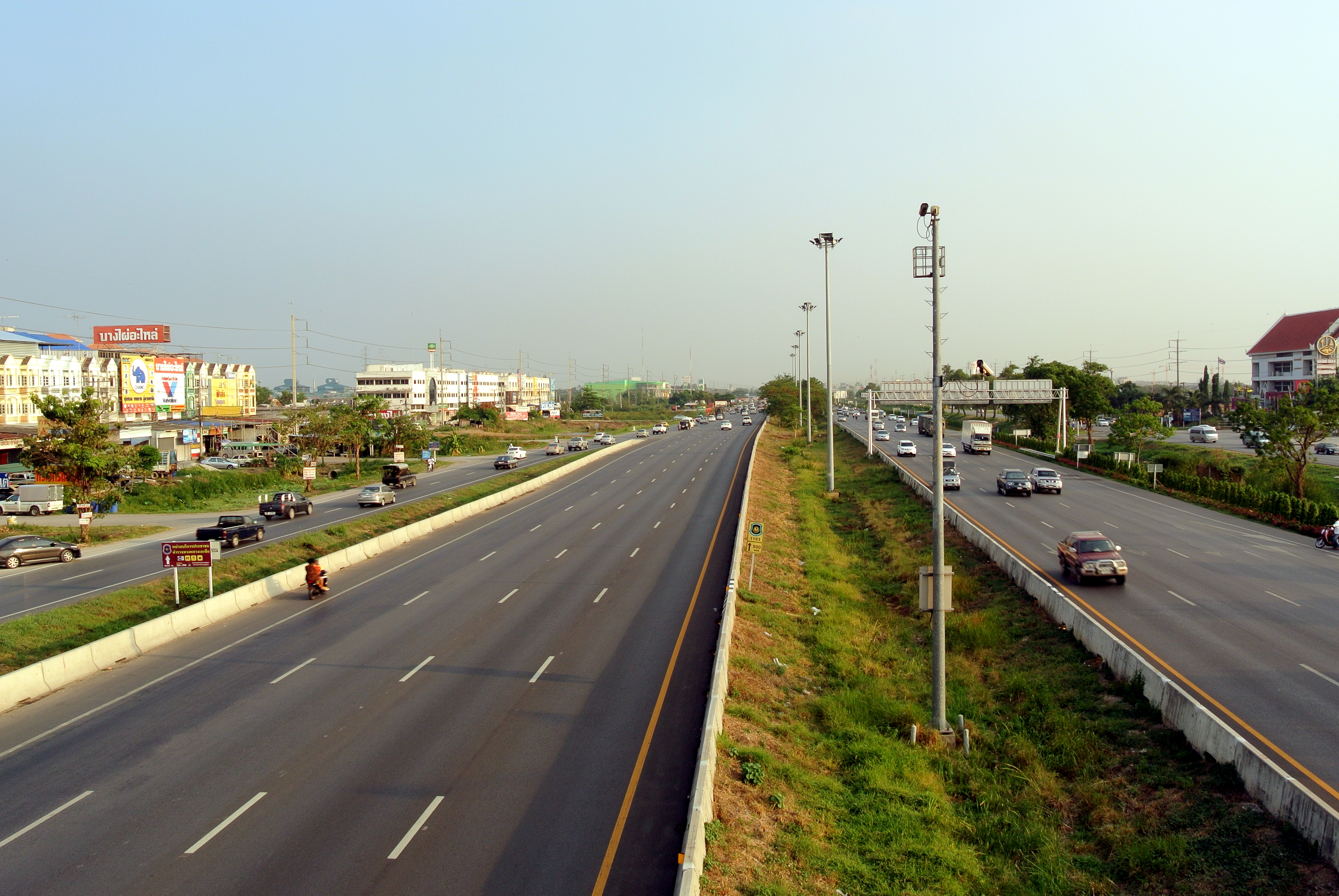
- AH1, AH2 and Highway 32 in Ayutthaya

Route information
- Part of AH1 AH2
- Length: 150.545 km (93.544 mi)
- Existed: 1973–present

Major junctions
- From: Bang Pa-in Interchange in Bang Pa-In, Ayutthaya province
- To: Luang Por O Junction in Manorom, Chai Nat province

Location
- Country: Thailand

Highway system
- Highways in Thailand; Motorways; Asian Highways

Highway 32 (Thai: ทางหลวงแผ่นดินหมายเลข 32, RTGS: Thang Luang Phaendin Mai Lek Sam Sip Song) is a national highway in Thailand.

It begins in Bang Pa-In District in Phra Nakhon Si Ayutthaya Province at the junction of Phahonyothin Road (Highway 1) and the Outer Bangkok ring road (Motorway 9), then passes through the provinces of Ang Thong, Singburi, and Chainat, where it merges back into Phahonyothin Road directly at the border with Nakhon Sawan Province.

Until the mid-1990s, this highway was tolled. Two toll booths are still there today, but are now used as an administration building.

Compared with other long haul routes in the same direction, Highway 32 provide a shorter and faster way from Bangkok to Nakhon Sawan and Northern Thailand. It belongs to the Asian Highway Network's AH1 and AH2 and the Kunming-Bangkok Expressway.

From 2008 to 2009, due to the high volume of traffic between Bangkok and Nakhon Sawan, the highway was expanded from four lanes to six lanes and in some sections eight lanes.
