= Highway 36 (Thailand) =

Road in Thailand

National Highway 36
- ทางหลวงแผ่นดินหมายเลข 36
- Kathing Lai-Pluak Ket Road สายกะทิงลาย–ปลวกเกตุ
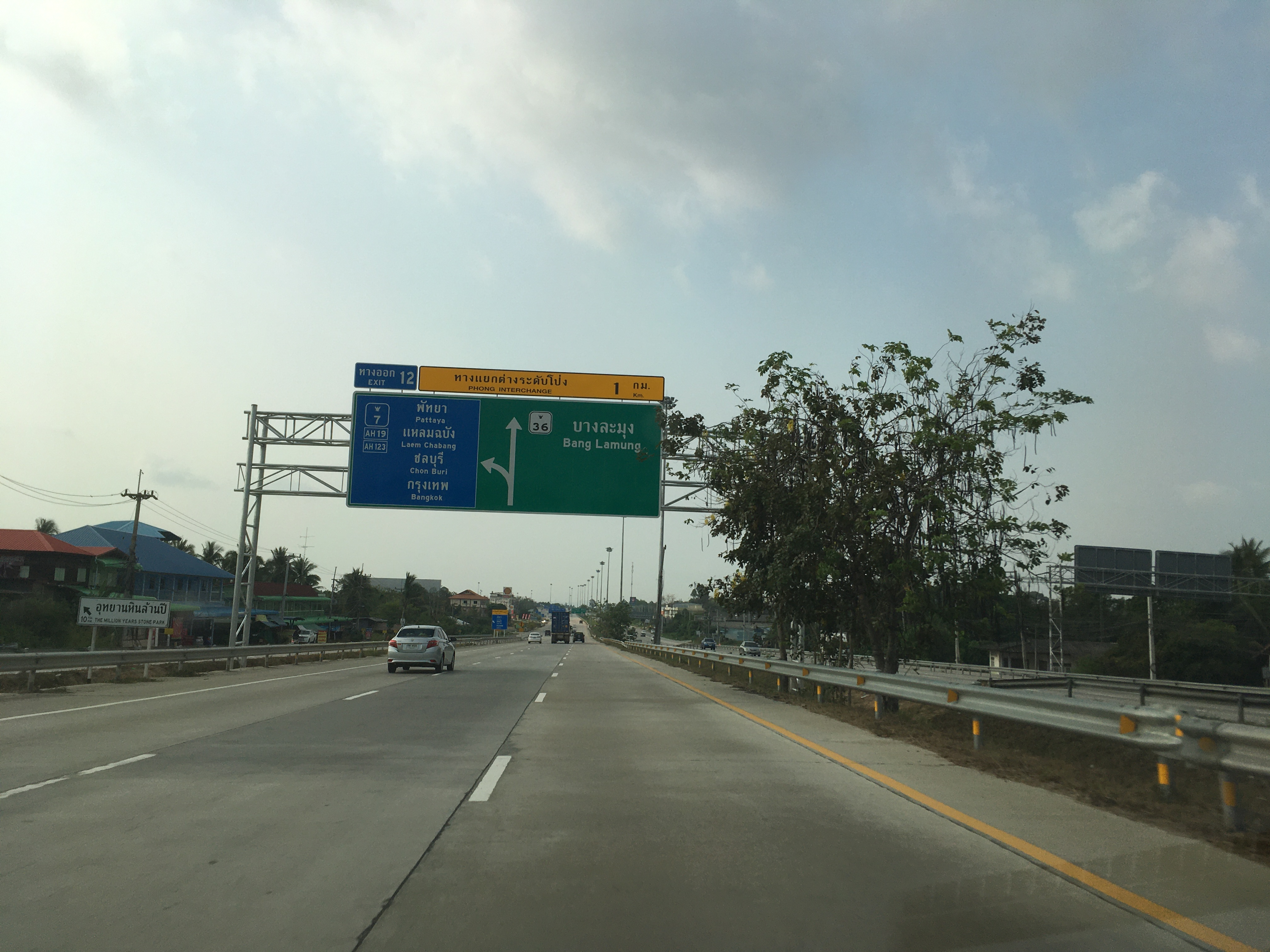

Route information
- Part of AH123
- Maintained by Department of Highways
- Length: 57.021 km (35.431 mi)

Major junctions
- Northwest end: Bang Lamung, Chonburi
- Southeast end: Mueang Rayong, Rayong

Location
- Country: Thailand
- Provinces: Chonburi, Rayong

Highway system
- Highways in Thailand; Motorways; Asian Highways

Highway 36 (Kathing Lai-Pluak Ket) (Thai: ทางหลวงแผ่นดินหมายเลข 36) commonly known as the Bypass Pattaya-Rayong (Thai: ถนนบายพาสพัทยา–ระยอง) is a six-lane concrete highway. It was constructed to shorten the travel distance between Laem Chabang and Rayong City via bypassing Pattaya, Sattahip District, Ban Chang District, and the Map Ta Phut Industrial Estate. This route has been designated as part of Asian Highway 123.

== Route ==
National Highway 36 begins at a junction with Sukhumvit Road at the Krating Lai Intersection in Bang Lamung District, Chonburi Province, and terminates at National Highway No. 3 at the Pluak Ket Intersection in Choeng Noen Subdistrict, Mueang Rayong District, Rayong Province, covering a total distance of 57 kilometres (35 mi).

Previously, the Chonburi-Pattaya bypass formed part of this national highway, it branched off from Sukhumvit Road at the Nong Mai Daeng Interchange, passed the Bangkok–Chonburi Motorway at the Khiri Nakhon Interchange, and rejoined the route at the Pattaya (Pong) Interchange, covering a total distance of 76 kilometres (47 mi), though the route has since been extended to the Central Pattaya Interchange.

Currently, the section between the Nong Mai Daeng Interchange and the junction leading to Bang Saen Beach is designated by the Department of Highways as National Highway 361 (Chonburi Bypass), while the section between the Bang Saen Interchange and the Central Pattaya spur, designated as Motorway 7 (Bangkok - Ban Chang Road). Consequently, National Highway 36 now comprises only the section between Krating Lai and Pluak Ket, a route under the jurisdiction of the Chonburi 2 Highway District and the Rayong Highway District.
