= Highway 21 (Thailand) =

Road in Thailand

National Highway 21
- ทางหลวงแผ่นดินหมายเลข 21
- ถนนสายสามแยกพุแค–เลย; Yaek Phu Khae - Loei Road

Route information
- Length: 412.874 km (256.548 mi)
- Existed: before 1937–present

Major junctions
- North end: Hwy 1 AH2, Chaloem Phra Kiat District, Saraburi Province
- South end: Hwy 201, Mueang Loei District, Loei province

Location
- Country: Thailand
- Provinces: Saraburi, Lop Buri, Phetchabun, Loei

Highway system
- Highways in Thailand; Motorways; Asian Highways

Highway 21 (Phu Khae Intersection–Loei) is a major north-south national highway connecting provinces in Central Thailand to Phetchabun and Loei province. The route begins at Phu Khae Intersection in Chaloem Phra Kiat District, Saraburi Province, and terminates in Mueang Loei District, Loei Province, covering a total distance of 412.874 kilometers.

National Highway No. 21 falls under the jurisdiction of Highway Office 6 (Phetchabun) for a distance of approximately 325 kilometers and Highway Office 11 (Lop Buri) for approximately 87 kilometers. There are two bypass routes: the Phetchabun Bypass Road (National Highway No. 234) and the Lom Sak Bypass (National Highway No. 21 itself).
