= Thai highway network =

Road network in Thailand

A highway sign, bearing the Thai national symbol and the route number

The Thai highway network follows the left-hand traffic rule of the road. The network is the twin responsibility of the Department of Highways (DOH, Thai: กรมทางหลวง, Krom Thang Luang), and the Department of Rural Roads (DORR, กรมทางหลวงชนบท, Krom Thang Luang Chonnabot), under the oversight of the Transportation ministry of Thailand. Public highways (ทางหลวง, thang luang) are also called public roads (ถนนหลวง, thanon luang), especially when part of urban streets. The network spans over 70,000 kilometers across all regions of Thailand. Most are single carriageways. Dual carriageways have frequent u-turn lanes and intersections slowing down traffic. Coupled with the increase in the number of vehicles and the demand for a limited-access motorway, the Thai Government issued a Cabinet resolution in 1997 detailing the motorway construction master plan. Some upgraded sections of highway are being turned into a "motorway", while other motorways are not being built from highway sections.

== Types of highways ==
The 1992 Highway Act (Thai: พระราชบัญญัติทางหลวง พ.ศ. 2535), revised as the 2006 Highway Act (Thai: พระราชบัญญัติทางหลวง (ฉบับที่ 2) พ.ศ. 2549), defines the following five highway types:

A special highway (Thai: ทางหลวงพิเศษ) or motorway is a high capacity highway designed for high speed traffic, for which the Department of Highways carries out construction, expansion, upkeep and repairs, and is registered as such. Motorway entrances and exits have controlled access, and controlled by the DOH. Registration of motorways is overseen by the Director General of the DOH.

A national highway (Thai: ทางหลวงแผ่นดิน) is a primary highway, part of the network connecting regions, provinces, districts, and other important destinations, for which the DOH carries out construction, expansion, upkeep and repairs. Registration of national highways is overseen by the Director General of the DOH.

A rural highway (Thai: ทางหลวงชนบท) or rural road is a highway for which the Department of Rural Roads carries out construction, expansion, upkeep and repairs. Registration of rural highways is overseen by the Director General of the DORR.

A local highway (Thai: ทางหลวงท้องถิ่น) or local route is a highway for which the local administrative organization carries out construction, expansion, upkeep and repairs. Registration of rural highways is overseen by the provincial governor.

A concession highway (Thai: ทางหลวงสัมปทาน) is a highway for which a legal government concession has been granted. Registration of concession highways is overseen by the Director General of the DOH.

== Highway numbering ==
The first digit of a highway number indicates the region of Thailand it serves, with the number of digits indicating the highway classification. These regions are:

Shield	Regions
	Northern Thailand.
	Northeastern Thailand.
	Central and eastern, including the upper south.
	Southern Thailand, except the upper south.

A single digit indicates one of four highways connecting Bangkok to outlying regions:

Highway	Name	Direction
	Phahonyothin Road	to northern Thailand
	Mittraphap Road	to northeastern Thailand
	Sukhumvit Road	to eastern Thailand
	Phetkasem Road	to southern Thailand

The Highway number system specifies the use of 4 digits to refer to highways. By dividing highways into 4 sub-levels as follows:

Digits	Meaning
	Two digits indicate a principal highway within a region.
	Three digits indicate a regional secondary highway.
	Four digits indicate an intra-province highway connecting a provincial capital to its districts, or between important sites.

== Highways by region ==
=== Northern Thailand ===
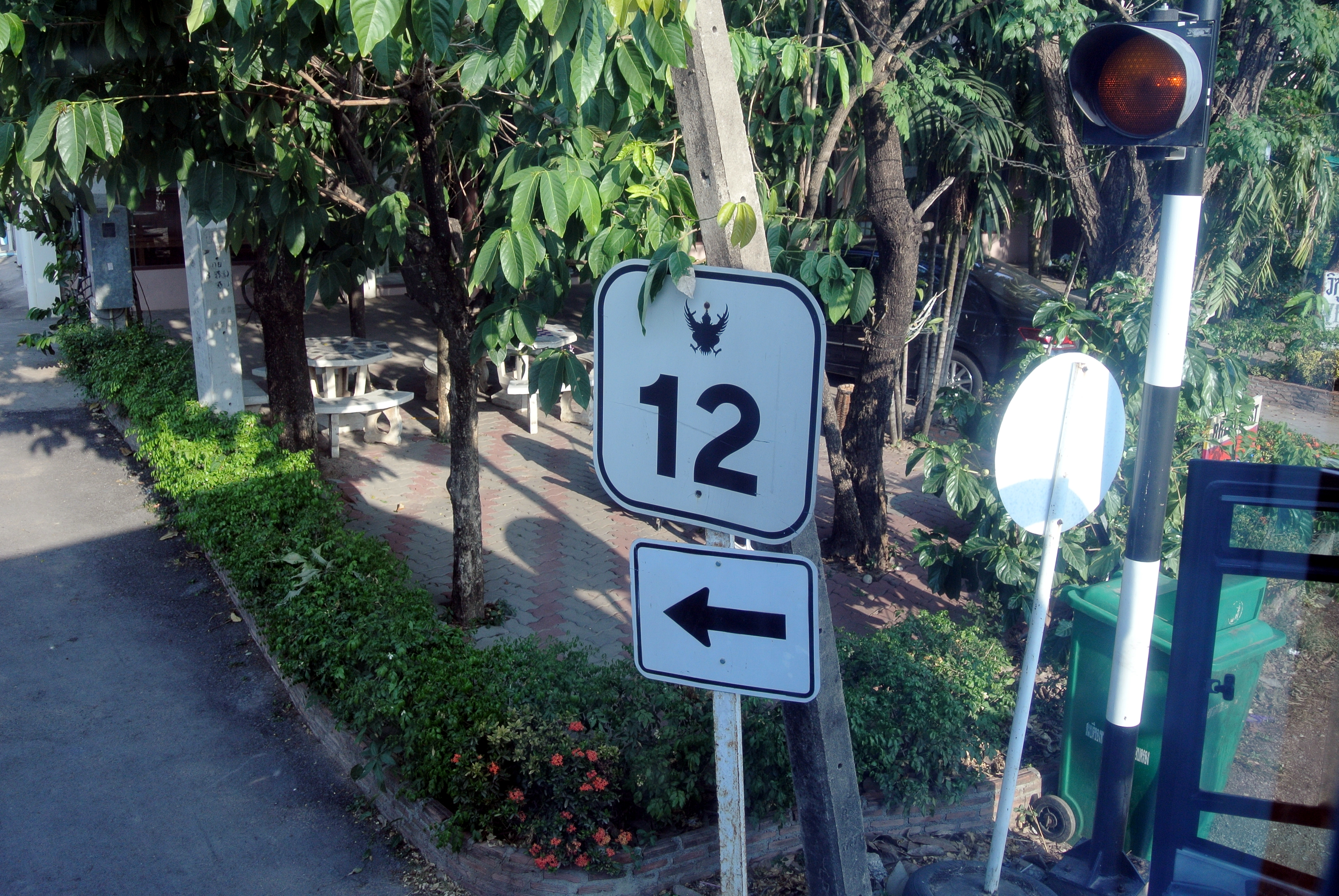
Sign on Route 12 in the north of the country

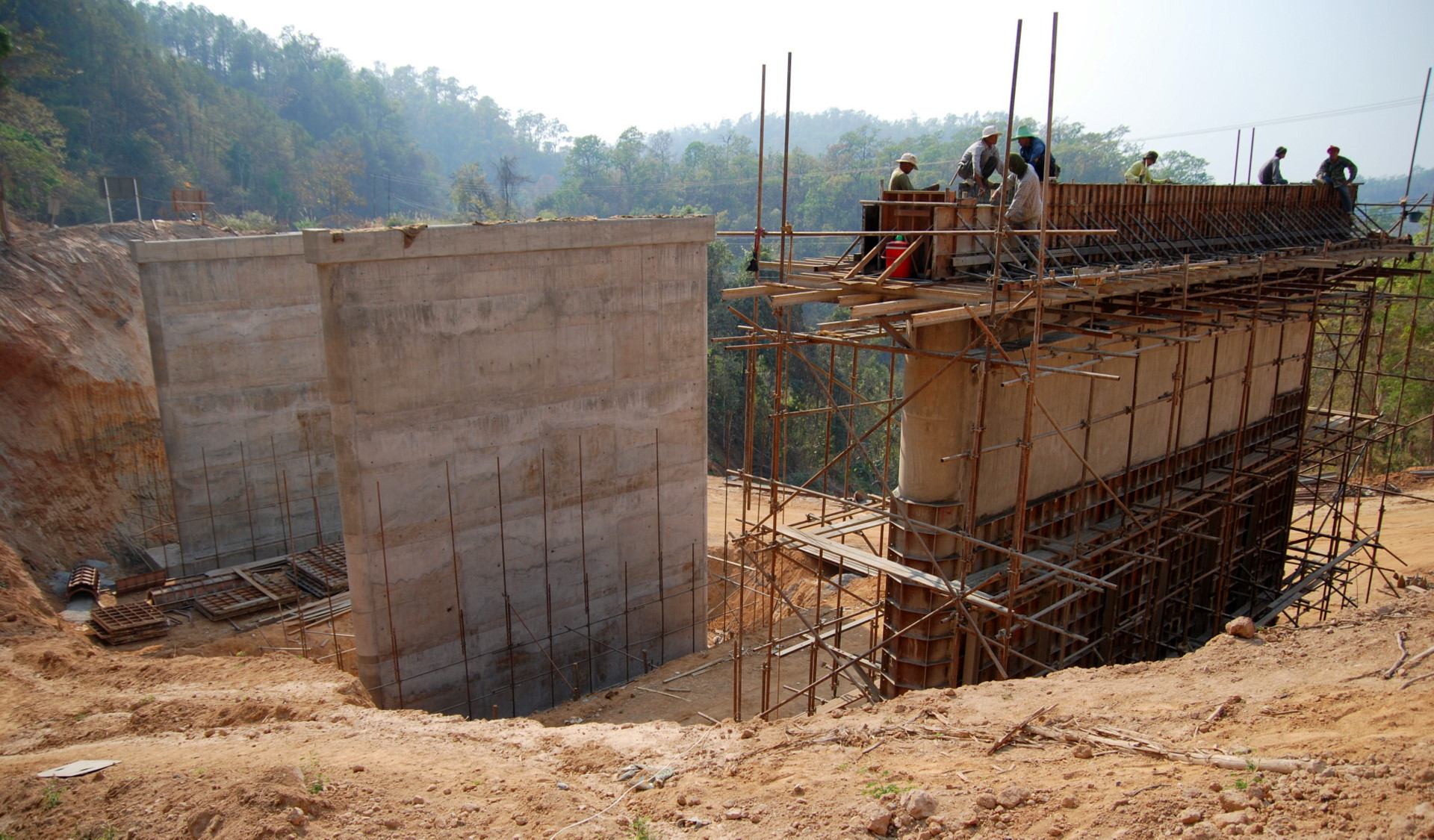
Bridge construction on route 108

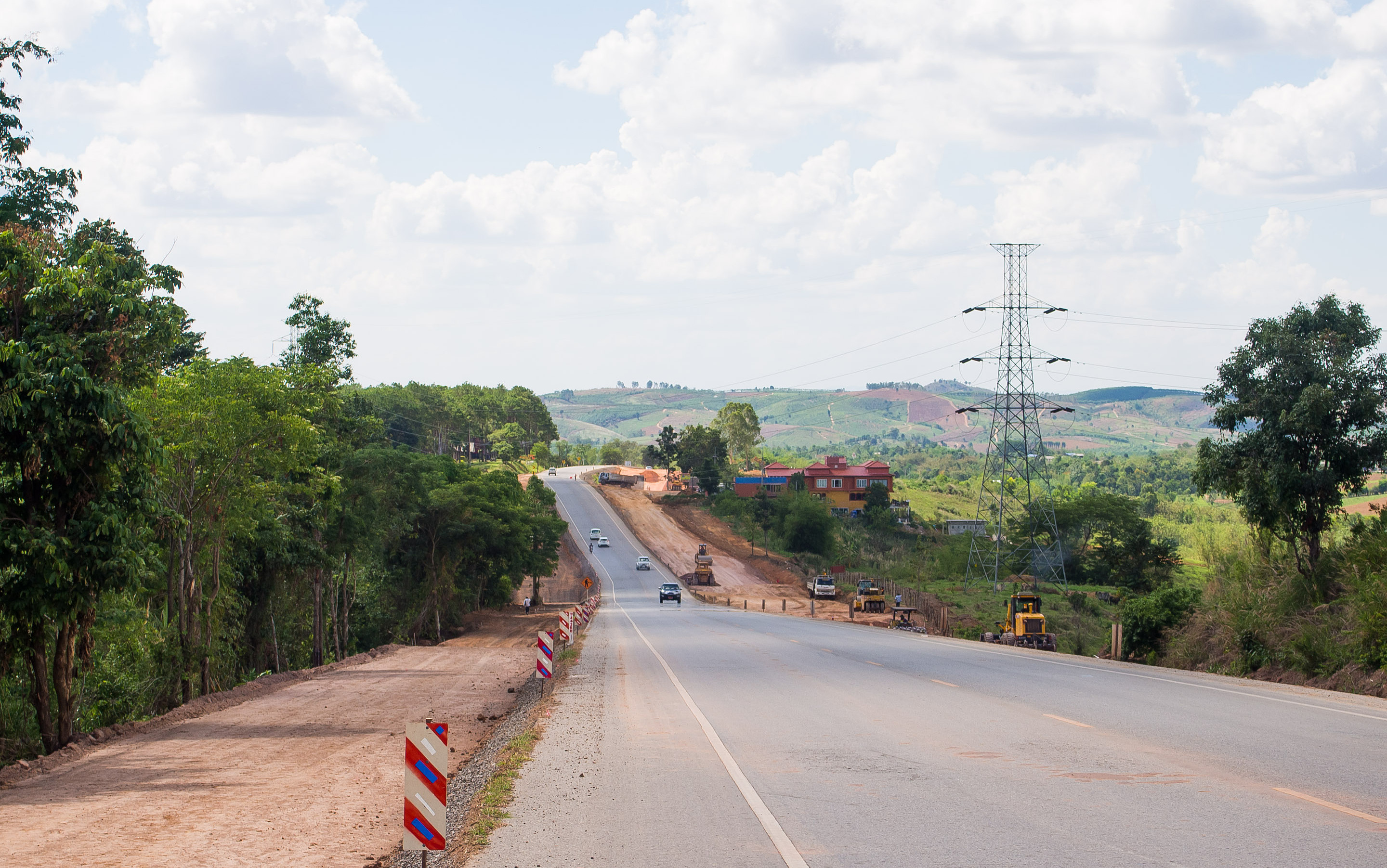
Route 12/Asian Highway 16 in Phetchabun Province being widened (2013)

Route	Km	Name	Destination	Remarks	Province
1-3 Digits
1	994.749	Phahonyothin Road	Bangkok-Mae Sai Checkpoint (Burmese border)	AH1, AH2, AH13	Bangkok; Pathum Thani; Ayutthaya; Saraburi; Nakhon Sawan; Chai Nat; Kamphaeng Phet; Tak; Lampang; Phayao; Chiang Mai; Chiang Rai
11	562.673	Wachirawut Damnoen Road; Chiang Mai-Lampang superhighway	Inburi-Chiang Mai	AH13	Sing Buri; Nakhon Sawan; Phichit; Phitsanulok; Uttaradit; Phrae; Lampang; Lamphun; Chiang Mai
12	793.391	Charoenwithithong Road; Singhawat Road; Mittraphap Road; Maliwan Road; Srichan Road; Thinanon Road	Mae Sot Checkpoint (Burmese border) -Mukdahan	AH1, AH13, AH16	Tak; Sukhothai; Phitsanulok; Phetchabun; Chaiyaphum; Khon Kaen; Kalasin; Roi Et; Mukdahan
101	505.853	Charoenwithithong Road; Yantrakitkoson Road	Kamphaeng Phet - Huai Kon/Nam Ngern Permanent Border Crossing (Laotian border)	AH13	Kamphaeng Phet; Sukhothai; Phrae; Nan
102	97.678	Borommarat Road; Phadwaree Road	Uttaradit - Mueang Kao		Uttaradit; Sukhothai
103	64.345	Wang Sai Road	Rongkwang - Ngao		Phrae; Lampang
104	26.015	Old Phahonyothin Road	Tak - Wutthikun Bridge		Tak
105	230.497		Mae Sot - Mae Sariang		Tak; Mae Hong Son
106	256.359	Chiang Mai-Lamphun Road; Inthayongyot Road; Charoen Rat Road; Lamphun-Pa Sang Road	Sawankhalok - Umong		Sukhothai; Lampang; Lamphun; Chiang Mai
107	236.140	Chang Phueak Road; Chotana Road; Fang Bypass Road; Fang-Tha Ton Road; Mae Chan-Fang Road	Chiang Mai - Mae Chan		Chiang Mai; Chiang Rai
108	349.359	Chiang Mai - Hang Dong Road; Chiang Mai - Hot Road	Chiang Mai - Mae Hong Son		Chiang Mai; Mae Hong Son
109	61.133		Mae Suai - Fang		Chiang Rai; Chiang Mai
110		Phahonyothin Road	Chiang Rai - Mae Sai (Burmese border)	Now a portion of Highway 1	Chiang Rai
111	12.575		Phichit Bypass		Phichit
112	13.064		Kamphaeng Phet Bypass		Kamphaeng Phet
112			Khao Sai - Wang Thong	Now a portion of Highway 11	Phichit; Phitsanulok
119		Phadwaree Road	Entrance to Uttaradit intersection	Now a portion of Highway 102	Uttaradit
4 Digits (10XX)
1001	93.657		Chiang Mai-Phrao		Chiang Mai
4 Digits (11XX)
1100	6.05		Entrance to Doi Kiew Ruesi		Phrae
4 Digits (12XX)
1200					
4 Digits (13XX)
1300	12.049		Khamang-Pho Prathap Chang		Phichit
4 Digits (14XX)
1400	4.829		Entrance to Pa Mamuang		Tak

=== Northeastern Thailand ===
Route	Km	Name	Destination	Remarks	Province
1-3 Digits
2	495.409	Mittraphap Road	Saraburi-Nong Khai Friendship Bridge (Laotian border)	AH12	Saraburi; Nakhon Ratchasima; Khon Kaen; Udon Thani; Nong Khai
21	412.874	Saraburi - Lom Sak Road; Lom Sak - Loei Road; Kotchaseni Road; Samakkhi Chai Road	Chaloem Phra Kiat-Loei		Saraburi; Lopburi; Phetchabun; Loei
22	239.171	Nittayo Road	Udon Thani-Nakhon Phanom	AH15	Udon Thani; Sakon Nakhon; Nakhon Phanom
23	278.752	Chaengsanit Road	Ban Phai-Ubon Ratchathani		Khon Kaen; Maha Sarakham; Roi Et; Yasothon; Ubon Ratchathani
24	420.145	Sathon Mark Road; Sathit Nimankan Road	Sikhio-Ubon Ratchathani	AH121	Nakhon Ratchasima; Buriram; Surin; Sisaket; Ubon Ratchathani
24		Mittraphap Road	Phitsanulok - Lom Sak	Became a portion of Highway 12	Phitsanulok; Phetchabun
201	382.228	Sikhiu-Chiang Khan Road	Sikhiu - Chiang Khan overpass		Nakhon Ratchasima; Chaiyaphum; Khon Kaen; Loei
202	392.320	Niwet Rat Road	Chaiyaphum - Khemmarat	AH121	Chaiyaphum; Nakhon Ratchasima; Buriram; Maha Sarakham; Roi Et; Yasothon; Amnat Charoen; Ubon Ratchathani
203		Samakkhi Chai Road	Lom Sak - Loei	Became a portion of Highway 21	Phetchabun; Loei
204	18.839		Nakhon Ratchasima Bypass	AH12; Former portion of Highway 2	Nakhon Ratchasima
205	231.085	Suranaree Road	Ban Mi - Suranaree Intersection		Lopburi; Chaiyaphum; Nakhon Ratchasima
206	36.576	Phimai-Huai Thalang Road	Kae - Hindad Market		Nakhon Ratchasima
207	36.379	Jenjobtit Road	Ban Wat - Prathai		Nakhon Ratchasima
208	56.233	Nakhon Sawan Road	Tha Phra - Mahasarakham		Khon Kaen; Maha Sarakham
209		Srichan Road	to the Khon Kaen Municipality Control Area - Yang Talat	Became a portion of Highway 12	Khon Kaen; Kalasin
210	118.908	Bunyaharn Road	Udon Thani - Wang Saphung		Udon Thani; Nong Bua Lamphu; Loei
211					
212					
213					
214					
215					
216					
217					
218					
219					
220					
221					
222					
223					
224					
225					
226					
227					
228					
229					
230	48.332		Khon Kaen Ring Road		
231	46.142		Ubon Ratchathani Ring Road		
232	26.596		Roi Et Ring Road		
233	7.310				
234	18.367		Phetchabun bypass		
235		Sakon Nakhon - Naga Road	Naga City Bypass	Became a portion of Highway 223; original route of Highway 223 now Highway 2425	Nakhon Phanom
238	13.862		Mukdahan bypass		
239	0.517		Entrance to the Mekong River Bridge at Mukdahan	Second Thai–Lao Friendship Bridge	
240	9.089		Nakhon Phanom bypass		
241	10.145		Sakon Nakhon Bypass		
242	26.958		Nong Khai - Tha Bo		
243	2.475	Sadet Road; Old Mittraphap Road	Nong Khai - Thai/Lao Friendship Bridge Border Crossing		
244			Entrance to the bridge across the Mekong River at Bueng Kan	Fifth Thai–Lao Friendship Bridge	
247	11.600		Nong Khai Bypass		
288	15.559		Buriram Ring Road		
290	110.700		Nakhon Ratchasima Ring Road		
291	13.853		Maha Sarakham bypass		
292	8.191		Yasothon bypass		
293	37.087		Surin City Ring Road		
294	10.965		Sisaket bypass road		
295	1.400		Entrance to the Mekong River Bridge in Nakhon Phanom	Third Thai–Lao Friendship Bridge	
296					
297					
298					
299	135.464		Lam Nam Phan - Nong Bong		
4 Digits (20XX)
2001		Bung Nam Tao-Tham Phra Road	Entrance to Ban Tham Phra	Downgraded to local highway under control of Phetchabun Provincial Administration Organization	Phetchabun
4 Digits (21XX)
2100		Tubkob-Kokdu Road	Tubkob-Kokdu	Downgraded to Rural Road LY.4014	Loei
4 Digits (22XX)
2200		Prangku-Kammaet Road	Prangku-Kammaet	Downgraded to Local Highway under control of Prangku Subdistrict Administration Organization	Sisaket
4 Digits (23XX)
2300	30.337		Nong Nae-Nong Khuan		Mahasarakham
4 Digits (24XX and above)
2400	45.601	Old R.P.C Highway	Nong Hin-Erawan		Loei; Nong Bua Lamphu
2601	21.242	Motorway 6 Frontage Road	Service road on the left side of Motorway 6 Bang Pa-in - Nong Khai		Nakhon Ratchasima
2602	14.197	Motorway 6 Frontage Road	Service road on the right side of Motorway 6 Bang Pa-in - Nong Khai		Nakhon Ratchasima

=== Central, western and eastern Thailand ===
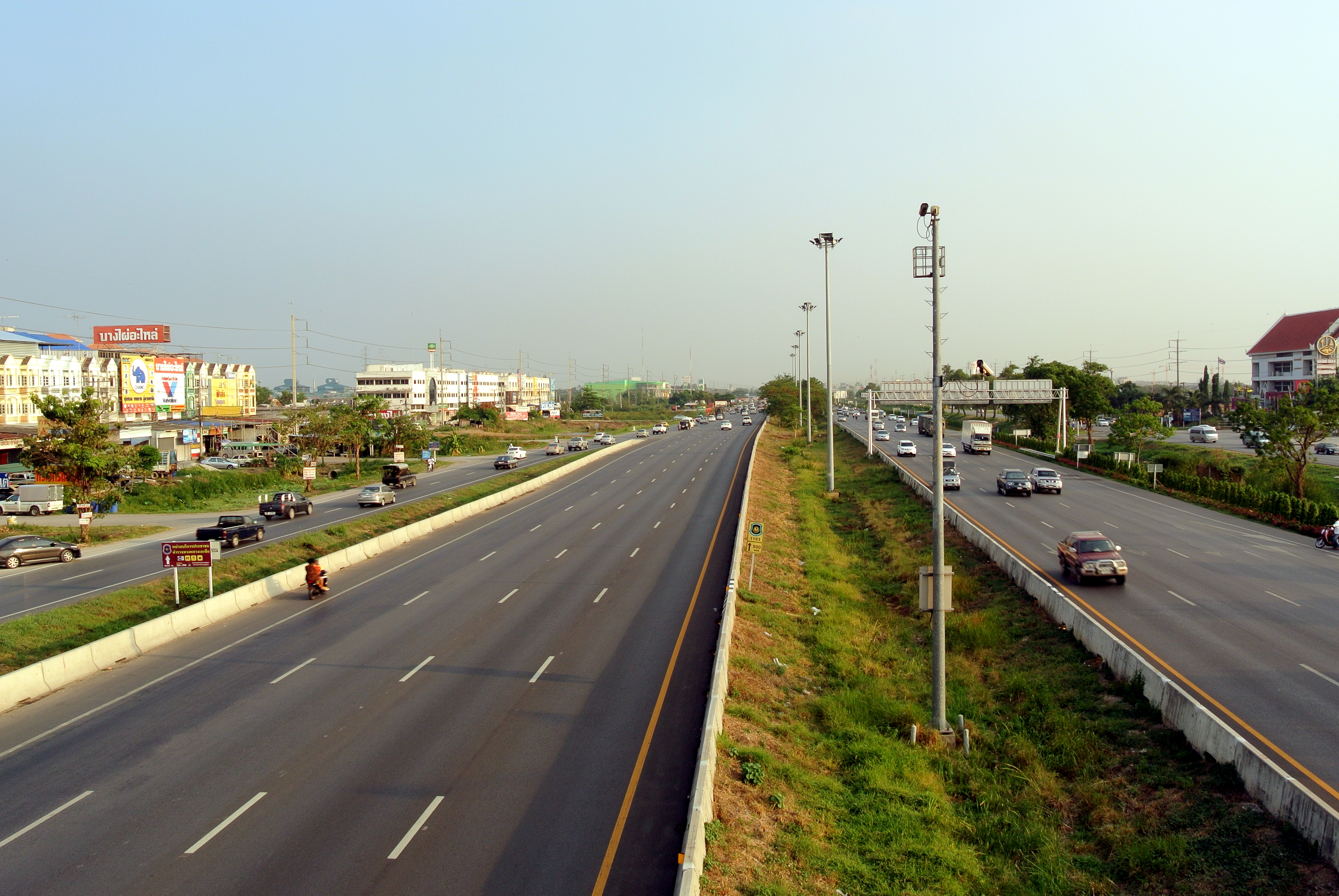
AH1, AH2 and Highway 32 in Ayutthaya

Route	km	Name	Destination	Remarks	Province
1-3 Digits
3	426.931	Sukhumvit Road	Bangkok-Hat Laek	Rayong–Ban Hat Lek part of AH123	Bangkok; Samut Prakan; Chachoengsao; Chonburi; Rayong; Trat
31	23.510	Vibhavadi Rangsit Road	Din Daeng-Don Mueang		Bangkok; Pathum Thani
32	150.545	Asian Road	Bang Pa-in-Manorom	Hin Kong–Chai Nat part of AH1 and AH2	Ayutthaya; Ang Thong; Sing Buri; Chainat; Nakhon Sawan
33	299.549	Suphanburi-Pa Mok Road; Phachi-Hinkong Road; Suwannason Road	Suphan Buri-Aranyaprathet (Cambodian border)	Aranyaprathet–Hin Kong part of AH1	Suphanburi; Ang Thong; Ayutthaya; Saraburi; Nakhon Nayok; Prachinburi; Sa Kaeo
34	58.855	Debaratana Road; Bang Na–Trat Road	Bang Na-Chonburi	AH19	Bangkok; Samut Prakan; Chachoengsao; Chonburi
35	84.041	Rama II Road	Chom Thong-Pak Tho		Bangkok; Samut Sakhon; Samut Songkhram; Ratchaburi
36	57.021	Pattaya-Rayong Bypass Highway	Bang Lamung-Rayong	AH123	Chonburi; Rayong
36		Chonburi-Pattaya Bypass Highway	Nong Mai Daeng Interchange - Pattaya Interchange (Pong)	Nong Mai Daeng Interchange - Bangsaen Beach Intersection section now part of Highway 361; Bangsaen Interchange - Pattaya Klang Intersection section now part of Motorway 7	Chonburi
37	47.468	Cha-am-Pranburi Bypass Road; Phetkasem Road	Cha-am-Pranburi	AH2	Phetchaburi; Prachuap Khiri Khan
37		Bangkok Outer Ring Road (West)	Bang Khun Thian - Bang Pa-in	Now part of Motorway 9 (Kanchanaphisek Road, west side)	Bangkok; Nonthaburi; Pathum Thani; Ayutthaya
38		Uttaraphimuk elevated road	Memorial Elevated Walkway - Rangsit	Now part of Motorway 5	Bangkok; Pathum Thani
301	1.741	Bangkok-Nonthaburi Road	Khlong Bang Khen - Tiwanon		Nonthaburi
302	17.27	Ngamwongwan Road; Rattanathibet Road	Kasetsart University Intersection - Bangyai Interchange		Bangkok; Nonthaburi
303	15.269	Suk Sawat Road	Rat Burana - Phra Samut Chedi		Bangkok; Samut Prakan
304	294.065	Chaeng Watthana Road; Ram Inthra Road; Suwinthawong Road; Mahachakkraphat Road; Sukprayoon Road; Chachoengsao-Kabin Buri Road; Kabin Buri-Pak Thong Chai Road; Suebsiri Road	Pak Kret - Nakhon Ratchasima Overpass	AH19	Nonthaburi; Bangkok; Chachoengsao; Prachinburi; Nakhon Ratchasima
305	74.811	Rangsit-Nakhon Nayok Road (Pathum Thani Province); Nakhon Nayok-Rangsit Road (Nakhon Nayok Province)	Rangsit - Nakhon Nayok		Pathum Thani; Nakhon Nayok
306	26.424	Pibulsongkram Road, Pracharat Road, Tiwanon Road	Rama 7 - Bang Phun		Bangkok; Nonthaburi; Pathum Thani
306		Charan Sanit Wong Road	Tha Phra - Rangsit Intersection	Downgraded to a local highway under control of Bangkok	Bangkok
307	10.813	Nonthaburi-Pathum Thani Road; Bangkok-Pathum Thani Road; Pathumthani-Krungthep Road; Pathum Thani Outer Road	Suan Somdet Intersection - Pathum Wilai Intersection		Nonthaburi; Pathum Thani
308	6.55	Udomsorayuth Road	Entrance to Bang Pa-in		Ayutthaya
309	92.828	Rojana Road; Ayutthaya-Ang Thong Road; Ang Thong-Sing Buri Road	Wang Noi - Sing Buri		Ayutthaya; Ang Thong; Sing Buri
310	1.975		Entrance to Phra Phutthabat Saraburi		Saraburi
311	75.490	Narai Maharat Road; Lopburi-Chainat Road	Lopburi - Chainat		Lopburi; Sing Buri; Chai Nat
312		Wongto Road	intersection with Highway 1 - Chai Nat province	Now part of Highway 3521	Chai Nat
313		Thasung Road	Uthai Thani - Manarom - Highway 1 intersection	Now part of Highway 3265	Uthai Thani; Chai Nat
314	22.300	Siri Sothon Road	Bang Pakong - Chachoengsao		Chachoengsao
315	44.551	Sukprayoon Road	Chachoengsao - Chonburi		Chachoengsao; Chonburi
316	6.116	Raksakchamun Road	Khao Rai Ya - Chanthaburi		Chanthaburi
317	147.587	Chanthaburi-Sa Kaeo Road	Chanthaburi - Sa Kaeo		Chanthaburi; Sa Kaeo
318		Trat-Klong Yai Road; Trat-Hat Lek Road	Trat - Hat Lek	Now part of Highway 3	Trat
319	48.064	Suwinthawong Road	Nong Cha-om - Phanomsarakham		Prachinburi; Chachoengsao
320	6.831	Prachin Thani Road	Naresuan Shrine - Prachin Buri Railway Station		Prachinburi
321	106.333	Malai Man Road	Nakhon Pathom - Suphan Buri		Nakhon Pathom; Suphan Buri
322	23.544		U Ya - Don Chedi		Suphan Buri
323	276.991	Saeng Chuto Road; Ban Pong Bypass	Nong Takaeng - Three Pagodas Pass (Burmese border)		Ratchaburi; Kanchanaburi
324	48.635	U Thong Road	Kanchanaburi - Chorakhe Sam Phan		Kanchanaburi; Suphan Buri
325	42.406	Chusak Road	Bang Pae - Samut Songkhram		Ratchaburi; Samut Songkhram
326	2.000	Prachuap Khiri Khan Road	entrance to Prachuap Khiri Khan		Prachuap Khiri Khan
327	7.833	Chumphon-Ranong Road; Chumphon City Road	Phatthamporn Intersection - Mor Lek Intersection		Chumphon
329		Phachi-Hin Kong Road; Suphan Buri-Pa Mok Road	Highway 1 junction (Hin Kong) - Highway 340 (Suphan Buri)	Now part of Highway 33	Saraburi; Ayutthaya; Ang Thong; Suphan Buri
330	1.241	Railway Road; Wichit Songkhram Road	entrance to Ratchaburi		Ratchaburi
331	156.397	Sai Yutthasat Road	Sattahip - Khao Hin Son		Chonburi; Chachoengsao
332	14.487	Sattahip Bypass Road	Khao Haad Yao - U-Tapao Airport		Chonburi; Rayong
333	182.838	U Thong-Ban Rai Road; Nong Chang-Ban Rai Road; Uthai Thani-Nong Chang Road	U Thong - Tha Nam Oi		Suphan Buri; Uthai Thani; Nakhon Sawan
334	4.300		Ang Thong - Ban Ro Interchange		Ang Thong
335	1.040		Sing Nuea - Sing Buri Intersection		Sing Buri
336	0.851	Lat Phrao Road	Entrance to Lat Phrao	Former portion of Highway 3185	Bangkok
338	31.419	Borommaratchachonnani Road	Arun Amarin - Nakhon Chai Si		Bangkok; Nakhon Pathom
339			Highway 306 intersection (Bang O) - Nonthaburi Bridge - Pathum Thani	Now part of Highway 307	Nonthaburi; Pathum Thani
340	164.210	Bang Bua Thong–Suphan Buri Road; Suphan Buri–Chai Nat Road	Bang Bua Thong - Chainat	Much of route former Highway 3039	Nonthaburi; Pathum Thani; Ayutthaya; Suphan Buri; Chai Nat
340		Rama II Road - Taling Chan; Taling Chan - Suphan Buri Road	Bang Khun Thian - Bang Bua Thong	Became part of Highway 37 (now Motorway 9); Kilometer zero moved to Bang Bua Thong interchange	Bangkok; Nonthaburi
341	3.352	Sirindhorn Road	Bang Phlat - Bang Bamru		Bangkok
343		Rama IX Road (new section)	Khlong Tan - Lat Krabang	Downgraded to local highway under control of Bangkok	Bangkok
344	102.181		Chonburi - Klaeng		Chonburi; Rayong
345	20.105		Bang Bua Thong - Bang Phun		Nonthaburi; Pathum Thani
346	111.027		Rangsit - Phanom Thuan Interchange	Former Highway 3035, Highway 3194 and portion of Highway 306	Pathum Thani; Nonthaburi; Nakhon Pathom; Kanchanaburi
347	66.246		Techno Pathum Thani - Chao Pluk		Pathum Thani; Ayutthaya
348	137.788	Thanawithi Road	Aranyaprathet - Nangrong		Sa Kaeo; Buriram
349	17.302	Charoenwora Road	Phanat Nikhom - Nong Chak		Chonburi
350	4.409		Ratchadaphisek-Ram Intra		Bangkok
351	12.328	Kaset-Nawamin Road	Kasetsart University - Khan Na Yao		Bangkok
352	27.934	Thanyaburi-Wang Noi Road	Thanyaburi - Lam Ta Sao		Pathum Thani; Ayutthaya
354	0.945		entrance to Suvarnabhumi Airport from Bang Phli - King Kaew Road		Samut Prakan
356	9.401	Ayutthaya Bypass Road	Ban Wa - Pak Khlan		Ayutthaya
357	45.723	Suphan Buri Ring Road			Suphan Buri
359	72.719	Sa Kaeo - Khao Hin Son Road; Khao Hin Son - Sa Kaeo Road	Khlong Yang - Khao Hin Son		Sa Kaeo; Chachoengsao
360	11.855	New Chumphon Road	entrance to Chumphon		Chumphon
361	14.216		Chonburi Bypass		Chonburi
362	31.345		Saraburi Ring Road		Saraburi
363	7.949	entrance to Map Ta Phut Industrial Estate	Rayong Government Center - Map Ta Phut Industrial Estate		Rayong
364	3.909		Rayong Bypass		Rayong
365	10.881	Bang Khwan Temple Bypass Road (northern side); Chachoengsao Bypass Road (southern side)	Chachoengsao Bypass	Formerly portions of Highway 304 and Highway 314	Chachoengsao
366	19.310	Lopburi Southern Bypass Road	Lopburi Bypass	Formerly a portion of Highway 311	Lopburi
367	13.154		Kanchanaburi Bypass	Entire route is part of AH123; formerly a portion of Highway 323	Chanthaburi
368	4.865		Ang Thong Bypass		Ang Thong
369	1.434		Sing Buri Bypass		Sing Buri
370	2.743	Suvarnabhumi Road 3	entrance to Suvarnabhumi Airport on Bang Na - Bang Wao Road		Samut Prakan
372	5.371		Aranyaprathet Bypass		Sa Kaeo
375	63.910		Bam Bo - Lam Luk Bua	Formerly Highway 3097 and Highway 3036 until 2013	Samut Sakhon; Nakhon Pathom
376	9.950		Ratchaburi Bypass	Formerly Rural Road 1001 until 2020	Ratchaburi
377	7.998		Ang Thong Bypass (northern section)	Under construction	Ang Thong
4 Digits (30XX)
3001	0.178		entrance to Jiraprawat Military Camp		Nakhon Sawan
3002			Pak Nam Pho - Tha Ta Kui	Downgraded to local highway	Nakhon Sawan
3003			intersection with Highway 1 - Chao Phraya River (Krok Phra)	Downgraded to Rural Road 1111	Nakhon Sawan
3004	114.889	Nong Pling Ruam Jai Road; Sap Samothon-Wang Phikul Road	Jiraprawat Intersection - Sub Samothod		Nakhon Sawan
3005	14.114	Sawanwithee Road	Nakhon Sawan - Krok Phra		Nakhon Sawan
3006	0.168		entrance to Takli Market		Nakhon Sawan
3007			Highway 3265 - Tha Nam (Manronom) Intersection		Nakhon Sawan
3008	3.653		Phayuha Khiri - Noen Makok		Nakhon Sawan
3009			Original route around Hankha	Now part of Highway 3211	Chai Nat
3010	13.489		Sarpaya - Sarakburi		Chai Nat
3011	41.571		Ban Rai - Ban Tai		Uthai Thani
3012	0.034		Nong Chang Intersection		Uthai Thani
3013	46.272		Nong Chang - Lad Yao		Uthai Thani; Nakhon Sawan
3014			Highway 1 (Sao Thong) - Kong Bin (Poei Yan Noi)		Lopburi
3015			Thang Rot Fai - Ananda Mahidol Hospital		Lopburi
3016	6.000		Lopburi - Erawan Camp		Lopburi
3017	53.139		Nikhom - Wang Muang Intersection		Lopburi; Saraburi
3018			Srisunthorn Roundabout - Sut Thang		Lopburi
3019	2.050		Kokkathiang Intersection - Kokkathiang railway station		Lopburi
3020	9.600		Phra Phutthabat - Nong Don		Saraburi
3021			Khao Ban Mo Intersection		Saraburi
3022	17.500		Phra Phutthabat - Tha Ruea		Saraburi
3023		Tha Ruea-Tha Lan Road	Tha Ruea - Tha Lan		Saraburi, Ayutthaya
3024	14.120		Ban Mi - Khao Chong Lom		Lopburi
3025			Thepsatri Circle, Lopburi		Lopburi
3026			Highway 205 - Khok Samrong district		Lopburi
3027	17.436		Tha Wung - Ban Beik		Lopburi; Sing Buri; Ang Thong
3028			Bang Nga - Ban Mi		Lopburi
3029			Highway 1 junction (Khao Phra Ngam) - edge of military area	Downgraded to local highway 7-0002	Lopburi
3030			Dong Makham Thet - Bang Rachan		Sing Buri
3031			Sing Buri - Inburi district	Now part of Highway 311	Sing Buri; Suphan Buri
3032			Bung Ki - Nang Buat		Sing Buri
3033			Bang Nga - Phokawiwat		Lopburi; Sing Buri
3034			Na Phra Lan - Ban Khrua		Saraburi
3035		Pathum Thani-Bang Len Road, Phon Damri Road, Bang Len-Kamphaeng Saen Road	Highway 321 junction (Kamphaeng Saen district) - Bang Len district - Lat Lum Keo district	Much of route now Highway 346; remaining section from the origin to the Pathum Thani Provincial Administrative Organization intersection now a local highway	Pathum Thani; Nonthaburi; Nakhon Pathom
3036			Highway 3095 (Nakhon Pathom) - Highway 346 (Beng Len)	Became a portion of Highway 375 in 2013	Nakhon Pathom
3037			Suphan Buri Municipality Control Area - Highway 340 (Bang Pla Ma)		Suphan Buri
3038	15.945		Don Chedi - Sri Prachan		Suphan Buri
3039	2.803		Sadao Du - Pak Nam Intersection		Suphan Buri
3040	23.500		Kamphaeng Saen - Phra Thaen Dong Rang		Nakhon Pathom; Kanchanaburi
3041	29.239	Phichai Rongrong Songkhram Road	Saraburi - Khao Krad		Saraburi
3042	4.982	Nong Yao - Phra Phutthachai			Saraburi
3043	20.903		Uthai Thani - Saphan Mai		Ayutthaya; Saraburi
3044			Sao Hai - Nong Saeng district	Now part of Highway 3041	Saraburi
3045	6.600		Wihan Daeng - Nong Moo		Saraburi
3046	3.315		Phra Phutthachai - Sam Lan Waterfall		Saraburi
3047			Khao Khad - Nong Saeng district	Now part of Highway 3041	Saraburi
3048	13.059		Huai Bong - Tha Lan		Saraburi
3049	18.250		Nakhon Nayok - Nang Rong Waterfall		Nakhon Nayok
3050	2.980		entrance to Sarika Waterfall		Nakhon Nayok
3051	18.800		Ban Na - Office of Atomic Energy for Peace		Nakhon Nayok
3052	7.500	Road to Chulachomklao Royal Military Academy	Pa San - Khao Cha Ngok		Nakhon Nayok
3053			Highway 309 (Pridi Thamrong Bridge) - junction with Highway 32	Base of Pridi Thamrong Bridge to Wat Pa Kho intersection downgraded to local highway A.T. 2-0020; Wat Pa Kho intersection to border of Ayutthaya municipality downgraded to local highway A.T. 2-0021; Ban Ko Subdistrict to Highway 32 downgraded to a local highway	Ayutthaya
3054			Highway 309 junction (right end) - U Thong Road (north side)		Ayutthaya
3055			Highway 309 junction (left end) - U Thong Road (south side)		Ayutthaya
3056	23.727		Ban Wa - Phachi		Ayutthaya
3057			Bang Pa-in railway station - Bang Pa-in	Downgraded to local highway	Ayutthaya
3058			Highway 309 (Sam Pluem Temple Chedi roundabout, left side) - Dusitdharam Temple	Ayutthaya Municipality: Downgraded to local highway A.T. 4-0004; Hanthra Subdistrict: Downgraded to local highway	Ayutthaya
3059		Chedi-Wat Yai Chai Mongkol Road	Highway 309 (Sam Pluem Temple Chedi roundabout, right side) - Wat Phanan Choeng	Ayutthaya Municipality: Downgraded to local highway A.T. 4-0001; Ayutthaya City Municipality: Downgraded to local highway A.T. 2-0020	Ayutthaya
3060			Phukhaothong - Paniat	Lumpli: Downgraded to local highway A.Th 130-01; Suan Phrik: Downgraded to local highway A.Th 139-02; Ayutthaya: Downgraded to local highway A.Th 2-0019	Ayutthaya
3061		Sports Stadium Road - Wat Phra Yatikaram Road; Wat Phra Yatikaram Road - Wat Kasang Road	Highway 3059 (Tao It) - Ban Ko	Chedi-Wat Yai Chai Mongkol Road to Wat Phra Yatikaram: Downgraded to local highway A.Th 4-0005; Wat Phra Yatikaram to boundary of Ayutthaya Municipality: Downgraded to local highway A.Th 4-0002; Thanu, Hantra, Ban Ko, Bo Phong: Downgraded to local highway	Ayutthaya
3062			Highway 309 (Wat Tum) - Bang Pa-in		Ayutthaya
3063	6.806		Bo Phong - Khok Mali		Ayutthaya
3064	32.171		Ang Thong - Pak Dong		Ang Thong; Sing Buri
3065			Pho Thong - Sawaengha	Now part of Highway 3064	Ang Thong
3066		Rangsit Canal Road	Rangsit - Chulalongkorn Gate		Pathum Thani
3067	31.436		Aranyaprathet - Phai Lom		Sa Kaeo
3068		Thanawithi Road	Aranyaprathet - Lahan Sai	Renumbered to Highway 348	Sa Kaeo; Buriram
3069		Prachin Anusorn Road	Prachinburi - Sri Maha Phothi	Now part of Highway 3079	Prachinburi
3070	13.550		Sri Mahosot - Sri Maha Bodhi		Prachinburi
3071		Prachin Anusorn Road	Prachinburi - Sri Maha Phothi	Downgraded to a local highway	Prachinburi
3072		Sivaboon Road	Prachantakam entrance intersection	Downgraded to local highway P.C.T. 10-002	Prachinburi
3073			Entrance to Watthana Nakhon City	Now part of Highway 3395	Sa Kaeo
3074			Entrance to Kabin Buri	Downgraded to local highway	Prachinburi
3075		Thesaban Road 19	intersection to Sa Kaeo railway station	Downgraded to local highway	Sa Kaeo
3076	209.287		Nakhon Nayok - Phai Lom	Former Highway 3347 and former portions of Highway 3245, Highway 3259 and Highway 3479	Nakhon Nayok; Prachinburi; Chachoengsao; Sa Kaeo
3077	11.600		Naresuan Shrine - Khao Yai		Prachinburi; Nakhon Nayok
3078	23.652		Raboh Phai - Prachantakham		Prachinburi
3079	43.516		Prachinburi - Phaya Chai		Prachinburi
3080			Entrance to Photharam	Now part of Highway 3090	Ratchaburi
3081	10.135		Tha Ruea - Phra Thaen Dong Rang		Kanchanaburi
3082		Old Saengchuto Road	intersection to Tha Maka	Now part of Highway 3548	Kanchanaburi
3083			intersection to Pak Phraek station		Prachinburi
3084	8.444		Tha Muang - Nong Khao		Kanchanaburi
3085	29.283		Yang Ko - Srimongkol		Kanchanaburi
3086	108.178		Lad Ya - Dan Chang		Kanchanaburi; Suphan Buri
3087	60.187		Ratchaburi - Kaem On	Former Highway 3274	Ratchaburi
3088	25.687		Ratchaburi - Wan Dao		Ratchaburi
3089		Khao Ngu-Bok Phrai Road / Ban Pong-Nong Pla Mo Road / Ban Pong-Ratchaburi Road	Prachinburi - Sri Maha Phothi	Now part of Highway 3291	Ratchaburi
3090	40.665		Ratchaburi - Wan Dao		Ratchaburi; Kanchanaburi
3091	19.851	Setthakit 1 Road	Om Noi - Samut Sakhon		Samut Sakhon
3092	2.000		Samut Songkhram - Lad Yai		Samut Songkhram
3093	19.888		Pak Tho - Samut Songkhram Pier		Ratchaburi; Samut Songkhram
3094	1.894		Entrance to Nakhon Chai Si		Nakhon Pathom
3095		Thanan Bok Road	Nakhon Pathom - control area of the Department of Army Animal Husbandry	Downgraded to local highway	Nakhon Pathom
3096		Na Phra Road, Ratchamangkha Road Outside, Ratchamangkha Road	Rajamangala - Sanam Chan	Downgraded to local highway	Nakhon Pathom
3097			Highway 4 (Phra Prathon) - Highway 35 (Ban Bo)	Became a portion of Highway 375 in 2013	Nakhon Pathom, Samut Sakhon
3098			intersection to Sam Phran	Downgraded to local highway	Nakhon Pathom
3099		Nonthaburi Road 1 / Sanambinnam Road	Highway 306 - Pak Kret Airport intersection	Absorbed into Highway 3110; now local highway 2-0017	Nonthaburi
4 Digits (31XX)
3100		Thonnasomsarang Road, Rangsit-Tiwanon Road, Rangsit-Prayurasak Canal Road	Highway 346 (Rangsit) - along the Rangsit to the Chao Phraya River	Now part of Highway 345	Pathum Thani
3101		Sihaburanukit Road	Minburi entrance intersection	Downgraded to local highway under control of Bangkok	Bangkok
3102	0.07	Sanphawut Road	Bang Na - Sanphawut		Bangkok
3103		Ratchadaphisek Road	Bang Son - Rama 6 - Wat Sroi Thong	Downgraded to local highway under control of Bangkok	Bangkok
3104		Nakhon Khuen Khan Road	intersection to Phra Pradaeng	Downgraded to local highway under control of Lat Lueng	Samut Prakan
3105			intersection to Phra Samut Chedi	Downgraded to local highway under control of Phra Samut Chedi	Samut Prakan
3106		Pracharat Road, Line 1		Downgraded to local highway under control of Bangkok	Bangkok
3107		Sukhumvit Road 71 (Pridi Banomyong), Ramkhamhaeng Road	Highway 3 (Phra Khanong) - Khlong Tan - Bang Kapi	Downgraded to local highway under control of Bangkok	Bangkok
3108			Suthisan - Huai Khwang - Din Daeng	Downgraded to local highway under control of Bangkok	Bangkok
3109		Old Paknam Railway Road	Khlong Toei - Highway 3 (Chonkhenoi)	Bangkok: Downgraded to local highway under control of Bangkok; Samrong Nuea: Downgraded to local highway	Bangkok; Samut Prakan
3110		Nonthaburi Road 1 Sanambinnam Road		Absorbed Highway 3099; downgraded to local highway 2-0017	Nonthaburi
3111	35.485	Pathum Thani-Sam Khok Road, Sam Khok-Sena Road	Pathum Thani - Sena		Pathum Thani; Ayutthaya
3112		Pathum Samphan Road, Pathum Thani-Lat Lum Kaeo Road	Pathum Thani - Lat Lum Kaeo	Absorbed into Highway 3035 (now Highway 346)	Pathum Thani
3113	6.300	Pu Chao Saming Phrai Road	Samrong - Bhumibol Bridge		Samut Prakan
3114		Thonnathaiban Road	Thai Ban - Pak Nam	Roundabout to Bang Pu subdistrict: Downgraded to local highway under control of Samut Prakan; Bang Pu: Downgraded to local highway 11-002	Samut Prakan
3115		Sailuat Road	Sailuat	Downgraded to local highway	Samut Prakan
3116		Phraeksa Road	Highway 3 (Bang Ping) - Phraeksa	Bang Pu: Downgraded to local highway 11-001; Phraeksa subdistrict: Downgraded to local highway 16-001; Phraeksa Mai Municipality: Downgraded to local highway	Samut Prakan
3117	7.882	Panawithi Road, Rattanarat Road	Khlong Dan - Bang Bo		Samut Prakan
3119	11.003	Rom Klao Road	Minburi - Lat Krabang		Bangkok
3120		Chueam Samphan Road	Lamphakchi - Nongchok	Downgraded to local highway under control of Bangkok	Bangkok
3121	17.813	Bangkhla-Plangyao Road	Bangkhla - Plaengyao		Chachoengsao
3122		Ban Pho - Don Sinon Road / Don Sinon - Ban Pho Road	Don Sinon - Ban Pho	Now part of Highway 3304 and a local highway	Chachoengsao
3123			Bang Khla - Bang Nam Priao		Chachoengsao
3124	8.746		Bang Nam Priao - Bang Khanak		Chachoengsao
3125		Road to Bangpakong District Office / Anantaprakarn Road	Bangpakong intersection	Downgraded to local highway 8-0006	Chachoengsao
3126	11.163		Phlo Ta Luang - Saensarn		Chonburi
3127	16.943		Map Pong - Hua Phai		Chonburi
3128			Highway 3 - Sriracha Market		Chonburi
3129		Thesaban Road 9	intersection to Bang Phra Reservoir	Downgraded to local highway Ch.T. 24-007	Chonburi
3130			Bang Pla Soi intersection	Downgraded to local highway	Chonburi
3131			Chonburi Municipality - Khao Bang Sai Temple	Downgraded to local highway	Chonburi
3132		Pattaya-Naklua Road	Highway 3 - Bang Lamung district	Downgraded to local highway Ch.T. 2-0008 under control of Pattaya	Chonburi
3133		Chonburi-Ban Bueng Road, Ban Bueng-Klaeng Road, Nong Chak-Nen Mok Road	Chonburi - Ban Bueng - Nong Chak - Pa Yup - Highway 331 - Klaeng District	Much of route now Highway 344; Ban Bueng: Downgraded to local highway Ch.T. 4-0002; Ban Bueng subdistrict: Downgraded to local highway Chulabhorn Rajavidyalaya School to Nong Chak Market: Downgraded to Rural Road Ch. 3059; Nong Chak to Highway 344: Downgraded to local highway Ang Wian intersection to Ban Lampung: Now part of Highway 3289; Ban Lampung to Highway 344: Downgraded to local highway Ch.T. 1-0703	Chonburi
3134	7.533	Ang Sila Road	Ang Sila - Khao Sam Muk Intersection		Chonburi
3135		Pattaya-Naklua Road; Pattaya Sai 1 Road; South Pattaya Road	Naklua Market - South Pattaya	Downgraded to local highways Ch.T. 2-0008, Ch.T. 2-0005 and Ch.T. 2-0007 under control of Pattaya	Chonburi
3136		North Pattaya Road	Highway 3 - North Pattaya intersection	Downgraded to local highway Ch.T. 2-0002 under control of Pattaya	Chonburi
3137		Bang Saen Beach Road	area of Bang Saen Resort	Downgraded to local highway	Chonburi
3138	19.2		Ban Bueng - Map Pu		Chonburi; Rayong
3139	21.234		Ban Laeng - Hat Yai		Rayong
3140	0.100		Entrance to Ban Phe		Rayong
3141			Entrance to U-Tapao		Rayong
3142		Nong Phaya-Kon Nong Road	Taphongnok - Banlang	Downgraded to local highway R.Y.T 1-0014 under control of Rayong Provincial Administrative Organization	Rayong
3143	14.041		Ban Kai - Nong Lalok		Rayong
3144	16.477	Saensuk Road	Nong Mon Market - Entrance to Khao Kheow Open Zoo		Chonburi
3145	24.940	Phe-Klaeng-Kram Road	Ban Phe - Laem Mae Phim		Rayong
3146		Tha Chalop Road	continuation of route under control of Chanthaburi Municipality - Tha Chalop	Downgraded to local highway	Chanthaburi
3147		Si Bun Rueang Road	Hua Hin - Tha Mai	Bang Kacha: Downgraded to local highway Si Phaya: Downgraded to local highway Khao Wua: Downgraded to local highway Tha Mai: Downgraded to local highway Th 19-015 under control of Tha Mai Municipality	Chanthaburi
3148	15.755		Trat - Laem Ngop		Trat
3149	15.802		Pliw - Laem Sing		Chanthaburi
3150		Tha Luang Road	Highway 3 (Ko Rong) - Chanthaburi Riverside	Plap Phla Narai: Downgraded to local highway J.T. 28-032; Chanthanimit Municipality: Downgraded to local highway J.T. 11-002	Chanthaburi
3151		Chaloem Burapha Chonlathit Road; Soi Chaloem Burapha Chonlathit 207 (Nong Chim-Ko Phet)	Highway 3149 (Nong Chim) - Koh Phet Intersection	Chaloem Burapha Chonlathit Intersection–Nong Chim-Ko Phet Intersection: Downgraded to Rural Road 4001; Nong Chim-Ko Phet Intersection–Ban Khao Tanui: Downgraded to local highway	Chanthaburi
3152	3.382		Tha Chui - Tha Mai		Chanthaburi
3153	7.500	Phraya Trang Road	Chanthaburi - Tha Mai		Chanthaburi
3154		Trirat Road	Trirat Bridge - Highway 3 (Ploy Siam)	Chanthanimit Municipality: Downgraded to local highway J.T. 11-001; Plap Phla Narai: Downgraded to local highway J.T. 28-033	Chanthaburi
3155	24.415		Trat - Laem Sok		Trat
3156	35.257		Laem Ngob - Saen Tung		Trat
3157	81.134	Jintanakan Road	Saen Tung - Laem Kho		Trat
3158	31.887		Saen Tung - Nong Bua		Trat
3159	26.690		Khao Saming - Nonthaburi		Trat
3160			Tha Chot - Tha Som - Bang Kradan	Now part of Highway 3156	Trat
3161			Highway 3 - Ao Khai Intersection	Downgraded to local highway R.Y.T. 1-0042	Rayong
3162		Soi Thetsaban Tung Kwai Kin 18; Soi Chaloem Burapha Chonlathit 43 (Sukhumvit)/Khlong Pun-Pak Nam Prasae Road; Chaloem Burapha Chonlathit Road	Entrance to Pak Nam Prasae	Thung Kwai Kin Subdistrict Municipality: Downgraded to local highway R.Y.T 10-018; Khlong Pun Subdistrict Administrative Organization–Khlong Pun Intersection: Downgraded to local highway R.Y.T 1-0032; Khlong Pun Intersection–Ban Pak Nam Prasae: Now part of Rural Highway R.Y. 4036	Rayong
3163			Noen Din Daeng - Sunthorn Phu	Downgraded to local highway R.Y.T. 1-0043	Rayong
3164			Sunthornvohan - Sunthorn Phu	Downgraded to local highway R.Y.T. 1-0045	Rayong
3165			at Phetchaburi Provincial Station		Phetchaburi
3166			Highway 4 - Nong Kae Intersection		Prachuap Khiri Khan
3167			Prachuap Khiri Khan - Nong Hin		Prachuap Khiri Khan
3168	11.710		Pranburi - Pranburi River Mouth		Prachuap Khiri Khan
3169	14.224		Bang Saphan Intersection - Chai Thale		Prachuap Khiri Khan
3170			Highway 4 Intersection - Tha Yang District		Phetchaburi
3171	5.075		Phetchaburi Municipality - Bandaiit		Phetchaburi
3172			Entrance to Khao Yoi railway station		Phetchaburi
3173			Phetchaburi - Khao Luang	Downgraded to local highway	Phetchaburi
3174			Nong Phao Than - Ban Tha		Phetchaburi
3175			Tha Yang - Phet Dam	Now part of Highway 3410	Phetchaburi
3176	12.600		Phetchaburi - Ban Laem West Side		Phetchaburi
3177	9.000		Phetchaburi - Chao Samran Beach		Phetchaburi
3178	12.675		Phetchaburi - Ban Laem East Side		Phetchaburi
3179	7.982		Phetchaburi Municipality - Ban Lat		Phetchaburi
3180	27.722		Tha Sae - Chumphon Government Center		Chumphon
3181	2.852		Entrance to Tha Sae Market		Chumphon
3182		Khao Yai - Khao Kheow Radar Station	Highway 3077 (Nong Khing) - Khao Khieo Intersection	Downgraded to local highways under control of Khao Yai National Park and the Royal Thai Air Force	Nakhon Nayok
3183	37.223		Chao Phraya Dam-Uthai Thani Branch		Chai Nat; Uthai Thani
3184	11.518		Dong Kon - Pak Nam		Chai Nat; Suphan Buri
3185		Lat Phrao Road	Bang Sue - Bang Kapi	One section renumbered to Highway 336; remainder became a local highway under control of Bangkok	Bangkok
3186		Tiwanon Road (Old)	Highway 346 - Pathum Thani Provincial Pier	Downgraded to local highway under control of Ban Klang Subdistrict Municipality	Pathum Thani
3187	28.201		Phet Dam - Bang Kula		Phetchaburi
3188	9.810	Sutbanthat Road	Thayiem - Ban Nuea		Saraburi
3188		Phran Nok Road	Fai Chai Intersection - Phran Nok Intersection	Downgraded to local highway under control of Bangkok	Bangkok
3189			Original entrance to Wang Noi	Downgraded to local highway	Ayutthaya
3190		Setthakit Road 1 Sukonthavit Road	Entrance to Krathum Baen	Downgraded to local highways	Samut Sakhon
3191	25.980	Ekkanikom Road	Map Ta Phut - Nong Pla Lai Reservoir		Rayong
3192			Entrance to Klaeng Port	Downgraded to local highway R.Y.T. 1-0046	Rayong
3193	61.617		Tabthai - Tamoon		Chanthaburi
3194		Phanom Thuan-Kamphaeng Saen Road	Phanom Thuan District - Phra Thaen Dong Rang - Kamphaeng Saen District	Now part of Highway 346	Kanchanaburi; Nakhon Pathom
3195	33.357	Pho Phraya-Tha Ruea Road	Suphan Buri - Pangiew		Suphan Buri; Ang Thong
3196	105.736	Lopburi-Bangpahan Roa; Bangpahan-Lopburi Road			Chai Nat; Nakhon Sawan; Lopburi; Ayutthaya
3197			Highway 33 (Huai Jot) - Bonang Ching	Downgraded to local highway S.K.T. 66-001	Sa Kaeo
3198	18.862		Chong Kum - Nong Sang		Sa Kaeo
3199	117.251	Sri Sawat Road; Erawan Road	Kaeng Sean - Sri Sawat		Nonthaburi
4 Digits (32XX)
3200	18.666	Suphakit Road; Chachoengsao-Bang Nam Priao Road	Chachoengsao - Bang Nam Priao		Chachoengsao
3201	33.821		Noen Santi - Ya Ruay Intersection		Chumphon
3202		Nawamin Road	Bang Kapi - Khan Ya Nao	Downgraded to local highway under control of Bangkok	Bangkok
3203	8.000		Entrance to the Huabkapong Royal Project		Phetchaburi
3205			Wat Chan - Rai Sat	Downgraded to local highway 1-0001 under control of Phetchaburi Provincial Administrative Organization	Phetchaburi
3207			Khao Kruat - Nong Chae Sao	Downgraded to local highway	Ratchaburi
3208	67.734	Khao Wang-Namphu Road; Khao Wang-Pha Pok Road	Khao Wang - Pha Pok Bat Mine		Ratchaburi
3209	80.611		Tha Maka - Kanchanaburi		Kanchanaburi; Ratchaburi
3210	14.518		Phang Ngon - Changwang		Chanthaburi
3211	57.313		Entrance to Hankha - Hu Chang Intersection		Chai Nat; Uthai Thani
3212	24.664		Khun Sampao - Nong Pho		Chai Nat; Nakhon Sawan
3213	41.101		Wat Sing - Khao Taphap Intersection		Chai Nat; Uthai Thani
3214	14.973	Khlong Luang Road; Chiang Rak Road	Ban Phrao - Khlong Ha		Pathum Thani
3215	24.488	Bang Kruai-Sai Noi Road (main road)	Khlong Wat Daeng - Sai Noi		Nonthaburi
3216		Thepkunakorn Road	intersection with Highway 314 - Si Sothon Road	Downgraded to local highway	Chachoengsao
3217	17.375		Kui Buri - Yang Chum		Prachuap Khiri Khan
3218	48.943		Hua Hin - Huai Phak Reservoir		Prachuap Khiri Khan
3219	4.742		Nong Tapao - Huai Mongkol		Prachuap Khiri Khan; Phetchaburi
3219			Highway 3218 (Nong Tapao) - Pa La-u Intersection	Ban Nong Tapao–Ban Nong Plap: Now part of Highway 3218; Ban Nong Plap–Wat Anan: Downgraded to a portion of Rural Road PK 2052	Prachuap Khiri Khan
3220	17.941		Sakaekrang - Krok Phra Intersection		Uthai Thani; Nakhon Sawan
3221	15.303		Uthai Thani - Thap Than		Uthai Thani
3222	38.947		Kaeng Khoi - Ban Na		Saraburi; Nakhon Nayok
3223			Highway 3017 - Kham Phran Intersection		Saraburi
3224	31.011		Ban Pa - Saeng Phan		Saraburi
3225	1.155		Dao Rueang - Saraburi Ring Road		Saraburi
3226			Highway 3520 junction - continue to Huai Khamin Subdistrict Administrative Organization road	Downgraded to Rural Road 4051	Saraburi
3227			Highway 3193 (Pak Kad) - Olamchiak Intersection	Downgraded to Rural Road 4031 under control of the Chanthaburi Rural Highways District	Chanthaburi
3228	2.826		Entrance to Linchang Pier		Kanchanaburi
3229	49.411		Nong Bua - Mae Thami checkpoint (Myanmar border)		Kanchanaburi
3230			U Thong Sanitary District Control Area - Ban Rai	Now part of Highway 333	Suphan Buri; Uthai Thani
3231	28.629		Makham Den - Bang Len		Nakhon Pathom
3232	12.117		Nong Phong Nok - Pai Chedi		Nakhon Pathom
3233	26.797		Nakhon Chai Si - Don Tum		Nakhon Pathom
3234	13.695		Sinsathong - Wat Pridaram		Nakhon Pathom
3235	6.239		Nakhon Chai Si - point on the Nakhon Chai Si River		Nakhon Pathom
3236			Entrance to Pho Hak Subdistrict Municipality		Ratchaburi
3237	6.709		Wat Kaew - Ban Rai		Ratchaburi
3238	12.259		Chetsamian - Khok Mo		Ratchaburi
3239	16.126		Nakhon Nayok - Khun Dan Prakan Chon Dam		Nakhon Nayok
3240	17.274	Chaiyapruek Road	Nongprue - Khao Mai Kaew		Chonburi
3241	24.959	Si Racha-Nongkho Road; Si Racha-Huabon Road; Atsamchan Road	Si Racha - Map Eang		Chonburi
3242	18.459	Ekkachai Road	Samut Sakhon - Bangpakok Hospital 8		Samut Sakhon; Bangkok
3243	0.635	Laem Pha Pha Road; Saraphi Canal Road	Laem Temple - Na Kluea		Samut Prakan
3244			Dakkanon - Tha Hat		Chai Nat
3245	92.292		Nong Pla Lai - Lat Krathing Reservoir		Rayong; Chonburi; Chachoengsao
3246	12.135	Phanat Nikhom-Ko Pho Road	Phanat Nikhom - Koh Pho		Chonburi
3247	15.792		Pong Namron-Changwang		Chanthaburi
3248			Highway 3193 (Ban Pa) - Nong Kok	Downgraded to Rural Road 4032 under control of the Chanthaburi Rural Highways District	Chanthaburi
3249	59.454		Khao Rai Ya - Praeng Kha Yang		Chanthaburi
3250	12.023		Nong Khandee - San Pradu		Saraburi
3251	33.332		Saraburi - Chan Sut		Chai Nat; Sing Buri
3252	10.000		Pak Than - Ban Ja		Sing Buri
3253	46.008		Ban Phla - Pathio		Chumphon
3255			Entrance to Ban Laem	Downgraded to Rural Road 4033 under control of the Chanthaburi Rural Highways District	Chanthaburi
3256	23.929	Tamru-Bang Phil Road; King Kaew Road	Bang Pu - King Kaew		Samut Prakan; Bangkok
3257		Bang Bua Thong-Saphan Nonthaburi Road; Bang Bua Thong-Bang Khu Wat Road; Bang Bua Thong-Pathum Thani Road	Nonthaburi Bridge - intersection with Highway 340	Now part of Highway 345	Pathum Thani; Nonthaburi
3258			Ban Mi District - In Buri		Lopburi; Sing Buri
3259	9.612		Si Yat Reservoir - Nong Khok		Chachoengsao
3260	23.929		Nong Wan Priang - Wat Pa Lelaiyok		Suphan Buri
3261	32.600	Khlong Sip-Nong Khae Road	Khlong 10 - Mouth of Khlong 13		Pathum Thani; Saraburi
3263	36.626		Ayutthaya - Sali Intersection		Ayutthaya; Suphan Buri
3264	15.394		Don Chedi - Srakhom		Suphan Buri
3265	11.812		Kok Mo Intersection - Tha Sung		Uthai Thani
3267	25.897	Ang Thong-Tha Ruea Road	Ang Thong - Bang Khom Intersection		Ang Thong; Ayutthaya; Saraburi
3268	18.459	Theparak Road	Samrong - Bang Bo		Samut Prakan
3269			Entrance to Mai Rut	Downgraded to local highway 33-001 under control of Mai Rut Subdistrict Administrative Organization	Trat
3270		Klong Yai-Hat Lek Road	Khlong Yai - Hat Lek	Became a portion of Highway 318 (now Highway 3)	Trat
3271	24.815		Noen Sung - Dan Chumphon		Trat
3272	40.986		Thong Pha Phum - Pilok		Kanchanaburi
3273	16.457		Khok Sung - Nong Ped		Ratchaburi; Kanchanaburi
3274			Highway 3087 (Buakhao Intersection) - Highway 3209 (Kaem On)	Now part of Highway 3087	Ratchaburi
3275			Entrance to In Buri	Downgraded to local highway	Sing Buri
3277	26.893	Makham-Khlung Road	Khlung - Makham		Chanthaburi
3278		Seri Thai Road	Bangkok Metropolitan Administration - Highway 304 (Bangchan Industrial Estate)	Downgraded to local highway under control of Bangkok	Bangkok
3281	1.244		Phra Phrom Intersection - Khlong Rang		Prachinburi
3282	53.639		Ban Rai - Nikhom Thap Salao Intersection		Uthai Thani
3283	3.519		Inthaburi - Thong-en		Sing Buri
3284	14.765		Noen Langtao - Nong Samet		Chonburi
3285	10.000		In Buri - Nong Sum		Sing Buri
3286		Charanyanon Road	Highway 34 (Bang Wa) - Highway 314 (Bang Pakong)	Bangwao subdistrict: Downgraded to local highway 17-001 under control of Bangwao Subdistrict Municipality; Bangwao Khanarak Subdistrict Municipality and Tha Saoan Subdistrict Administrative Organization: Downgraded to local highway under control of Chachoengsao Provincial Administrative Organization; Tha Saoan Subdistrict Municipality: Downgraded to local highway 8-0005 under control of Tha Saoan Subdistrict Municipality	Chachoengsao
3288	14.573		Tha Daeng - Wang Muang		Nakhon Nayok
3289	8.732		Nong Chak - Noen Mok		Chonburi
3290	17.461		Khok Udom - Khlong Sai		Prachinburi
3291	45.318	Chedi Hak Road	Chedi Hak - Boek Phrai		Ratchaburi
3292			Highway 318 (Tha Sen) - Laem Klat	Downgraded to Rural Road 1027 under control of Trat Rural Highways District	Trat
3293	1.700	Old Highway 3481; Bang Decha Subdistrict Administrative Organization bypass road Prachin Buri - Ban Sang Road	Bang Phluang - Ban Sang		Prachinburi
3294			Highway 321 (Kamphaeng Saen) - Kamphaeng Saen Aviation School	Downgraded to local highway	Nakhon Pathom
3295			Highway 309 junction - towards Ang Thong Municipality control area		Ang Thong
3296	12.774		Don Tum - Bang Len		Nakhon Pathom
3297	8.422		Nong Pla Lai - Don Tum		Nakhon Pathom
3298	0.563		Samruean - Bang Pa-in		Ayutthaya
3299	30.000		Chang Thun - Chok Di		Trat
4 Digits (33XX)
3300			Highway 3 (Khao Yai Chum) - Highway 3145 (Suan Son)	Downgraded to local highway R.Y.T. 1-0016 under control of Rayong Provincial Administrative Organization	Rayong
3301	0.447		Entrance to Samut Songkhram	Formerly a portion of Highway 325	Samut Songkhram
3301			Highway 3219 (Nong Plab) - Yang Chum Intersection	Now part of Highway 3218	Prachuap Khiri Khan; Phetchaburi
3302	7.000		Phra Phut Bat - Koktum		Lopburi
3303	10.812		Bang Rachan - Pho Thale		Sing Buri
3304	20.279		Ban Pho - Plaeng Yao		Chachoengsao
3305	39.853		Thanamtuen - Bankao		Kanchanaburi
3306	56.045		Nong Prue - Srakrajom		Kanchanaburi; Suphan Buri
3307			Highway 3198 (Nong Tao) - Wang Ri	Downgraded to Rural Highway SK. 4033 under control of the Rural Highways District of Sa Kaeo	Sa Kaeo
3308	7.395		Kok Phrek - Saeng		Sa Kaeo
3309	38.558	Sunsinpachip Road	Bang Pa-in - Bang Phun		Ayutthaya; Pathum Thani
3310	9.134	Phutthamonthon Sai 4 Road	Phang Ngon - Changwang		Chanthaburi
3311			Entrance to Khao Thong	Yang Tai: Downgraded to local highway Khao Thong: Downgraded to local highway N.S.T 36-001 under control of Khao Thong Subdistrict Administrative Organization	Nakhon Sawan
3312	39.206	Lam Luk Ka Road	Thupatemi Stadium - Khlong 16		Pathum Thani; Nakhon Nayok
3313	8.742		Khao Ang Kaew - Wang Kum		Phetchaburi
3313			Highway 3087 (Chat Pa Wai) - Pong Krathing	Now part of Highway 3206	Ratchaburi
3314	11.191		Tha Chang - Sanmakha		Saraburi
3315			Highway 314 - Highway 3216 (Bang Phra)	Downgraded to local highway C.C.T. 1-0005 under control of Chachoengsao Provincial Administrative Organization	Chachoengsao
3316	13.161	Phutthamonthon Sai 6 Road	Rai Khing - Songkhonong		Nakhon Pathom
3317			Entrance to Namtok railway station		Kanchanaburi
3318	27.757		Suphan Buri - Don Chaeng		Suphan Buri
3319	24.453		Krok Phra - Thap Than		Nakhon Sawan; Uthai Thani
3320			Highway 3 Intersection (Kachet) - Hat Yai	Klaeng Kachet Subdistrict Municipality: Downgraded to local highway Kachet Subdistrict Administrative Organization and Samnak Thong Subdistrict Administrative Organization: Downgraded to local highway R.Y.T. 1-0017	Rayong
3322	29.475		Noen Sung - Huai Sathorn		Chanthaburi
3323			Highway 3 junction (Noen Sung) - meets Highway 3147	Downgraded to local highway 21-001 under control of Noen Sung Subdistrict Municipality	Chanthaburi
3324			Highway 3313 intersection (Suan Phueng) - Huai Suea	Downgraded to local highway under control of Ban Kha Subdistrict Administrative Organization	Ratchaburi
3325	4.170		Entrance to Sai Yai Beach		Prachuap Khiri Khan
3326	31.104		Wangphloeng - Yang Thon		Lopburi
3327	26.723		Noen Makok - Khongwichan		Nakhon Sawan
3328			Khao Bo Kaeo - Hua Ngiew Industrial Estate	Downgraded to local highway	Nakhon Sawan
3329	39.074		Takhli - Nong Luang		Nakhon Sawan
3330			U Thong Sanitary District Control Area - Ban Rai	Now part of Highway 333	Nakhon Sawan
3331	17.739		Nong Piku - Mai Samakkhi		Nakhon Sawan
3332	2.128		Entrance to Suksomboon		Nakhon Sawan
3333	34.167		Nakhon Chai Si - Don Tum		Lop Buri
3334	29.002		Thara Kasem - Khao Suang Railway Station		Saraburi
3335	26.398		Ban Sing - Ban Phaeo		Ratchaburi; Samut Sakhon
3336	6.611		Kok Wat - Ban Rai		Ratchaburi
3337	35.116		Huai Chin Si - Hin Si		Ratchaburi
3338	0.600		Kubua - Ratchaburi		Ratchaburi
3339	11.307		Ratchaburi - Kubua		Ratchaburi
3340	20.000	Bo Thong-Nong Samet Road; Nong Samet-Bo Thong Road	Nong Samet - Bo Thong		Chonburi
3341			Koh Pho - meets Highway 3245 (Chumnum Prakfa)	Downgraded to local highway C.B.T. 1-1005 under control of Chonburi Provincial Administrative Organization	Chonburi
3342	38.776		Wang Khon - Bo Ploi		Kanchanaburi
3343	3.753		Wang Pho - Sai Yok		Kanchanaburi
3344	10.181	Srinakarin Road	Udomsuk - Samut Prakan		Bangkok; Samut Prakan
3345		Charoenwora Road	Phanat Nikhom - Nong Chak	Renumbered to Highway 349	Chonburi
3347			Phanomsarakham - Ban Sang	Now part of Highway 3076	Chachoengsao; Prachinburi
3348	12.346	Yanwirot Road	Nongkhon - Chanthanimit		Chanthaburi
3349	23.516		Nong Kwang - Nong Ya Plong		Phetchaburi
3350	12.023		Tha Chang Pier - Sa Buakham		Suphan Buri
3351	39.029		Kao Hong - Bang Luang		Suphan Buri; Nakhon Pathom
3353	18.841		Wong Sawang - Pa Rang		Lop Buri
3354	16.959		Nong Krabian - Chon Muang		Lop Buri
3356	23.929	Tamru-Bang Phil Road; King Kaew Road	Bang Pu - King Kaew		Suphan Buri; Kanchanaburi
3357			Pratunam - Tha Pha	Now part of Highway 3090	Ratchaburi; Kanchanaburi
3358	20.213		Thung Kok - Ben Phat		Suphan Buri; Kanchanaburi
3361			Makham Tia Checkpoint - Nong Pak Dong		Kanchanaburi
3363	36.626		Don Saep - Chong Dan		Kanchanaburi
3365	11.812		Sam Chuk - Nong I Phang		Suphan Buri
3366	26.678		Tha Kham - Non Sao E		Sa Kaeo
3367	0.655		Khlong Nam Sai - Khao Noi		Sa Kaeo
3369	14.843		Wat Amphasiriwong - Khlong 16		Nakhon Nayok
3370			Highway 3247 junction (Khao Hom) - Highway 3193 (Ban Pa) intersection	Downgraded to local highways	Chanthaburi
3371			Highway 3143 junction (Rayong Self-Reliant Settlement) - Highway 3191 (Self-Reliant Settlement)	Downgraded to local highway R.Y.T. 1-0063	Rayong
3372	59.151		Naku - Sibuathong		Ayutthaya; Ang Thong; Sing Buri
3373	16.457		Samko - Sri Prachan		Ang Thong; Suphan Buri
3374	46.550		Bang Saphan - Don Yang		Prachuap Khiri Khan; Chumphon
3375			Highway 3191 junction - intersection with Soi 14 of Rayong Self-Reliant Settlement	Downgraded to local highway R.Y.T 1-0064	Rayong
3376	29.742		Ban Chang - Soi 13 of Rayong Self-Reliant Settlement		Rayong
3377		Soi Thetsaban Tung Kwai Kin 17; Khao Din-Nam Sai Road	Highway 3 (Khao Din) - Nong Samet Intersection	Thung Kwai Kin Subdistrict Municipality: Downgraded to local highway R.Y.T 10-017; Thung Kwai Kin Subdistrict Administrative Organization, Nam Pen Subdistrict Administrative Organization, Khao Chamao Subdistrict Administrative Organization: Downgraded to local highway R.Y.T. 1-0036	Rayong
3378	10.124		Bangkhla - Phanomsarakham	Portions of route formerly Highway 3245	Chachoengsao
3379			Highway 3068 (Aranyaprathet) - Pa Rai Intersection	Became a portion of Highway 3397 (now Rural Highway SK.3085)	Sa Kaeo
3380			Highway 3068 junction (Nong Aek) - Highway 3381 (Ang Sila)	Downgraded to local highway under control of Sa Kaeo Provincial Administrative Organization	Sa Kaeo
3381			Highway 3068 (Nong Waeng) - Pa Rai Intersection	Ban Khok Sung to Ban Pa Rai: Became a portion of Highway 3397 (now Rural Highway SK.3085); Ban Nong Waeng to Ban Khok Sung: Became a branch of Highway 348; now Rural Highway SK.3086	Sa Kaeo
3382			Ban Rai - Nikhom Thap Salao Intersection	Downgraded to Rural Highway SK.3069 under control of the Rural Highways District of Sa Kaeo	Sa Kaeo
3383			Highway 3367 junction (Khao Noi) - meets Highway 3384 (Sai Deaw)	Ban Khao Noi–Ban Non Sao E: Now part of Highway 3366; Ban Non Sao E to Highway 3384: Now part of Highway 3067	Sa Kaeo
3384	15.528		Non Sao Ae - Sai Dio		Sa Kaeo
3385	2.350		Napralan - Nong Chan		Saraburi
3387	7.102		Nong Wan Priang - Thap Kradan		Suphan Buri
3388	14.639		Ban Pong - Bo Rai		Trat
3389		Thesaban Road 6	Highway 3157 (Bo Rai) - Pa A		Trat
3390	37.173		Nong Ree - Bo Yang		Kanchanaburi
3391			Highway 317 Intersection - Khao Soi Dao Waterfall	Downgraded to local highways under control of Sai Khao Subdistrict Municipality and Sai Khao Subdistrict Administrative Organization	Chanthaburi
3392		Pakorn Songkhro Rat Road	Highway 3 Intersection (Huai Pong) - Nong Fab	Downgraded to local highway under control of Map Ta Phut Municipality	Rayong
3393			Highway 3198 junction (Chong Kum) - Highway 348 (Kaew Phet Ploy)	Now part of Highway 3395	Sa Kaeo
3394	22.584		Luk Kae - Rang Pikun		Kanchanaburi; Ratchaburi; Nakhon Pathom
3395	124.118		Thung Khanan - Kaew Phet Ploy		Chanthaburi; Sa Kaeo
3396			Highway 1 - Chao Phraya River Intersection	Downgraded to local highway	Nakhon Sawan
3397			Highway 3068 junction (Nangam) - Highway 3381 (Khok Sung)	Absorbed highways 3379 and 3381; later became a branch of Highway 348, now Rural Highway SK.3085 under control of the Rural Highways Office of Sa Kaeo	Sa Kaeo
3398	13.804		Tha Phaniat - Thung Masang		Kanchanaburi
3399		Nong Singa-Laem Sadet Road; Chaloem Burapha Chonlathit Road; Soi Chaloem Burapha Chonlathit 78 (Khung Wiman)	Highway 3 (Nong Singa) - Laem Sadet Intersection	Nong Singa Intersection–Loma Sanam Chai Intersection: Downgraded to Rural Highway 1036; Loma Sanam Chai Intersection–Chao Lao Roundabout: Downgraded to a portion of Rural Highway 4001; Chao Lao Roundabout to Ban Laem Sadet: Downgraded to rural highway Loma Sanam Chai Intersection–Khung Wiman Intersection: Downgraded to a portion of Rural Highway 4001; Khung Wiman Intersection–Khung Wiman Beach: Downgraded to rural highway	Chanthaburi
4 Digits (34XX)
4 Digits (35XX)
3500	4.196		Nong Bua - Lat Ya		Kanchanaburi
3501	23.519		Ang Thong - Wat Taku		Ang Thong; Ayutthaya
3502	38.694		Don Rai - Krasio Reservoir		Suphan Buri
3504	39.432		Khlong Khoi - Khao Chan Kan		Uthai Thani; Nakhon Sawan
3505	27.851		Hang Tlat - Sri Samran		Suphan Buri
3507	27.215	Somboonkong Road	Phra Sri Rattana Mahathat Temple - Ban Kluai		Suphan Buri
3508	4.300	Kamphaeng Phet Road 6	Kamphaeng Phet Road 2 - Rangsit railway station		Bangkok; Pathum Thani
3509	3.600		Tha Chang Pier - Suan Kluai		Sing Buri
3510	69.146		Tha Yang - Yang Chum		Ratchaburi; Phetchaburi
3511	14.748		Saen Suk - Chanchu		Sa Kaeo
3512	0.150	Lam Luk Ka Road	Phunamron - Bong Ti		Kanchanaburi
3513		Entrance to Rajabhat Bansomdejchaopraya University, Sarayasom Campus	Highway 321 Intersection (Khlongrabainam) - Ban Yang	Downgraded to local highway S.P.T. 5-0004 under control of Khun Phat Pheng Subdistrict Municipality	Suphan Buri
3516	6.985		Bo Lang - Map Chup Hed	Former routing of Highway 3	Chanthaburi
3517	0.395		Original route to Plai Fam		Trat
3518		Sukhumvit Road	Takang - Cham Rak	Ban Takang–Ban Tha Luen: Downgraded to Rural Highway 1035; Wat Kiriwihan Intersection–Ban Tha Luen Police Station Intersection: Downgraded to Rural Highway 1041; Ban Tha Luen Police Station Intersection–Ban Chamrak: Downgraded to Rural Highway 1004	Trat
3519		Sukhumvit Road	Khlong Son - Khlong Muang	Downgraded to Rural Highway 1036	Trat
3520	2.565		Phai Tam - Nong Khae	Former routing of Highway 1	Saraburi
3521	0.110	Wongto Road	Entrance to Chai Nat		Chai Nat
3522	4.300		Foi Thong Hill - Phak Bia Field		Nakhon Sawan
3523	1.201	Matuli Road	Entrance to Nakhon Sawan		Nakhon Sawan
3524	1.195	Old Highway 4 Songphon Road	Nakhon Pathom - Lat Phrao	Former routing of Highway 4	Nakhon Pathom
3525	6.519		Krachap - Nong Pho Intersection	Former routing of Highway 4	Ratchaburi
3526	3.245		Kamphaengta - Ban Choek		Ratchaburi
3527	11.250		Checkpoint Ngo - Nong Puen Taek		Phetchaburi
3528	0.580		Entrance to Phetchaburi		Phetchaburi
3529			Entrance to Ton Mamuang Community	Absorbed into Highway 3528; now Highway 3647	Phetchaburi
3530			Entrance to Phetchaburi, west side		Phetchaburi
3531	3.398		Saraphatchang Intersection - Suphanburi Ring Road		Suphan Buri
3532	1.392		Suphan Buri Ring Road - Suphan Buri Railway Station		Suphan Buri
3533	2.952		Bang Pla Mo - Suphan Buri Ring Road		Suphan Buri
3534	1.041		Khlong Khanthat - Khlong Khanthat Floodgate Office		Suphan Buri
3541	0.215	Ongkharak - Bang Nam Priao Road (connected from Rural Highway 3001)	Entrance to Ongkharak		Nakhon Nayok
3542	0.325		Entrance to Dongkrak		Nakhon Nayok
3543	1.208		Wang Pho - Sai Yok		Kanchanaburi
3546	3.397		Tha Luang - Tamarind Market	Former routing of Highway 317	Chanthaburi
3547	1.684		Entrance to Wang Khon		Suphan Buri
3548	15.831		Tha Maka - Tha Muang	Former routing of Highway 323	Kanchanaburi
3549	2.550		Entrance to Sangkhlaburi		Kanchanaburi
3551	10.947		Nong Pla Tapien - Hua Samrong	Former routing of Highway 331	Chachoengsao
3553	18.841		Entrance to Uthai Thani Market		Uthai Thani
3557	0.726		Entrance to Suphanburi		Suphan Buri
3558	8.843		Wat Lao Thong - Wang Yang Intersection	Former routing of Highway 340	Suphan Buri
3559	0.800		Entrance to Pak Khlong Ha		Nakhon Sawan
3560	0.690		Branch to Lopburi		Saraburi
3561	0.066		Entrance to Nakhon Sawan Railway Station		Nakhon Sawan
3562	4.250		Lopburi - Pa Wai		Lopburi
3563	0.115		Saphan 6 Intersection - entrance to Ban Mi		Lopburi
3564	3.985		Phatthana Nikhom - Kaeng Suea Ten		Suphan Buri
3565			Nong Saeng - Nong Kae		Saraburi
3566	2.805		Phon Thong - Khon Cha-ngok		Saraburi
3567	0.655		Entrance to Mueang Luang		Ayutthaya
3569	2.762		Khaisunsi - Kongphlothanrapthi		Kanchanaburi
3570	7.806		Tha Phaniat - Khaisunsi		Kanchanaburi
3571	0.200		Entrance to Bang Nam Priao Railway Station		Chachoengsao
3572	0.461		Bang Nam Priao Market		Chachoengsao
3573	2.335		King Rama VI Monument - Saensuk Railway Station		Chonburi
3574	57.161		Map Pu - Rayong	Former portion of Highway 3138	Chonburi; Rayong
3575	2.254	Highway 3138/3574 Old Route	Entrance to Phanom Phrik		Rayong
3576	1.250		Nong Kha - Chantather Waterfall		Chonburi
3577	1.828		Entrance to Phanom Phrik		Rayong
3578	12.358		Route around Nong Pla Lai Reservoir		Rayong
3579	9.762		Thungnanangrok - Lat Ya		Kanchanaburi
3580	6.600		Saen To - Khao Chong		Kanchanaburi
3581	1.335		Entrance to Kanphophansat		Kanchanaburi
3582	4.645		Pla Mu Palace - Wang Lan Palace		Kanchanaburi
3583	0.365		Entrance to Hankha		Chai Nat
3584	0.631	Bang Kruai-Sai Noi Road	Bangyai - Bangmuang entrance		Nonthaburi
3585	2.013		Napralan - Nong Chan		Suphan Buri
3586	5.336		Khok Sabang - Nong Eian		Sa Kaeo
3587	3.372		Ban Tham - Yang Ra Hong		Chanthaburi
3589	0.436		behind Uthai Thani Prison		Uthai Thani
3590	2.012		Tha Sung - Manarom Pier		Uthai Thani
3591	2.086		Chiang Rak Noi - Chiang Rak Noi Temple		Pathum Thani; Ayutthaya
3592	1.869	Nimitmai Road	Entrance to Nimitmai		Pathum Thani
3593	5.540		Thadinnao - Sao Thong		Suphan Buri
3594	0.651		Entrance to Thap Than Market		Uthai Thani
3595	0.818		Wang Pho - Lumsum		Kanchanaburi
3596	1.130		Thonglang - Tharaimun		Nakhon Nayok
3597	0.896		Bang Pla Ma - Wang Ta Phet		Suphan Buri
3598	1.844		Nongprue - Wangsing		Kanchanaburi
3599	0.327		Entrance to Prasat Muang Singh		Kanchanaburi
4 Digits (36XX and above)
3600	10.625	Old Highway 225	Kechai - Chumsaeng		Nakhon Sawan
3602	9.630		Nong Kuti - Dong Dam		Suphan Buri
3603	5.900		Sam Ruean - in the middle of Wang Daeng		Ayutthaya
3604	1.899		Mun Lek - Ban Sang Market		Prachinburi
3605	0.888		Pho Phraya - Wang Yang		Suphan Buri
3606	3.568		Bang Wa - Bang Kwai (service road on the left)		Chachoengsao
3608	7.300		Nongkham - Laem Chabang Port overpass (service road on the left)		Chonburi
3609	3.568		Bang Wa - Bang Kwai (service road on the right)		Chachoengsao
3611	7.300		Nongkham - Laem Chabang Port overpass (service road on the right)		Chonburi
3616	0.340		Entrance to Ban Mai in Pak Hong		Sa Kaeo
3617			Khlong Tan Sien - Wang Yang		Suphan Buri
3618	6.050	Old Highway 33	original route to Huai Chot		Sa Kaeo
3619	0.500		Huai Phak - Yang Chum Reservoir		Phetchaburi
3620	0.611		Yang Thon Bypass		Lopburi
3621	0.181		Entrance to Ban Phot Phisai		Nakhon Sawan
3623	1.810		Kut Ta Phet - Kut Ta Phet Reservoir		Lopburi
3624	0.750		Wang Chueam - Kut Ta Phet Reservoir		Lopburi
3625	0.425		intersection to checkpoint A.04		Sa Kaeo
3626	0.104		Entrance to Ban O Trang		Prachinburi
3627	6.122	Old Highway 33	Khok Hom - Khlong Hae		Prachinburi
3628	0.443		Entrance to Charoenphon Market		Nakhon Sawan
3630			Pakbung - Tham Niap		Ratchaburi
3632			Entrance to Kamphaeng Temple	Downgraded to local highway	Ayutthaya
3633			Bang Toei - Chao Phraya River	Downgraded to local highway	Pathum Thani
3640	3.197		Sanamchai Khet - Huai Nam Sai		Chachoengsao
3643	2.620	Samut Songkhram Bypass Road (former Highway 3093)	Samut Songkhram Municipality - Samut Songkhram Pier		Samut Songkhram
3644			Entrance to Chet Samian		Ratchaburi
3645	0.350		Entrance to Khao Rong Krua Community		Nakhon Sawan
3646	4.471		Tod Noi - Thai-Cambodian Friendship Bridge (Nong Eian)		Sa Kaeo
3647	1.597		Entrance to Ton Mamuang Community		Phetchaburi
3648	11.533		Klaeng Bypass		Rayong
3649	30.354	Old Highway 33	Nong Kwang - Nong Ya Plong		Nakhon Nayok; Prachinburi
3651	7.445	Phutthasakorn Road	Khok Pak Pli - Huai Khue		Samut Sakhon
3701	121.727		Service road on left side of Motorway 7		Bangkok; Samut Prakan; Chachoengsao; Chonburi
3702	119.175		Service road on right side of Motorway 7		Bangkok; Samut Prakan; Chachoengsao; Chonburi
3811	8.646		Service road on left side of Motorway 81		Nakhon Pathom; Kanchanaburi
3812	5.532		Service road on right side of Motorway 81		Nakhon Pathom; Kanchanaburi
3901	110.195	Kanchanaphisek parallel road Khubon Road (alongside Kanchanaphisek Road in Khlong Sam Wa District)	Service road outside of Motorway 9		Bangkok; Nonthaburi; Pathum Thani; Ayutthaya; Samut Prakan
3902	112.388	Kanchanaphisek parallel road	Service road inside of Motorway 9		Bangkok; Nonthaburi; Pathum Thani; Ayutthaya; Samut Prakan

=== Southern Thailand ===
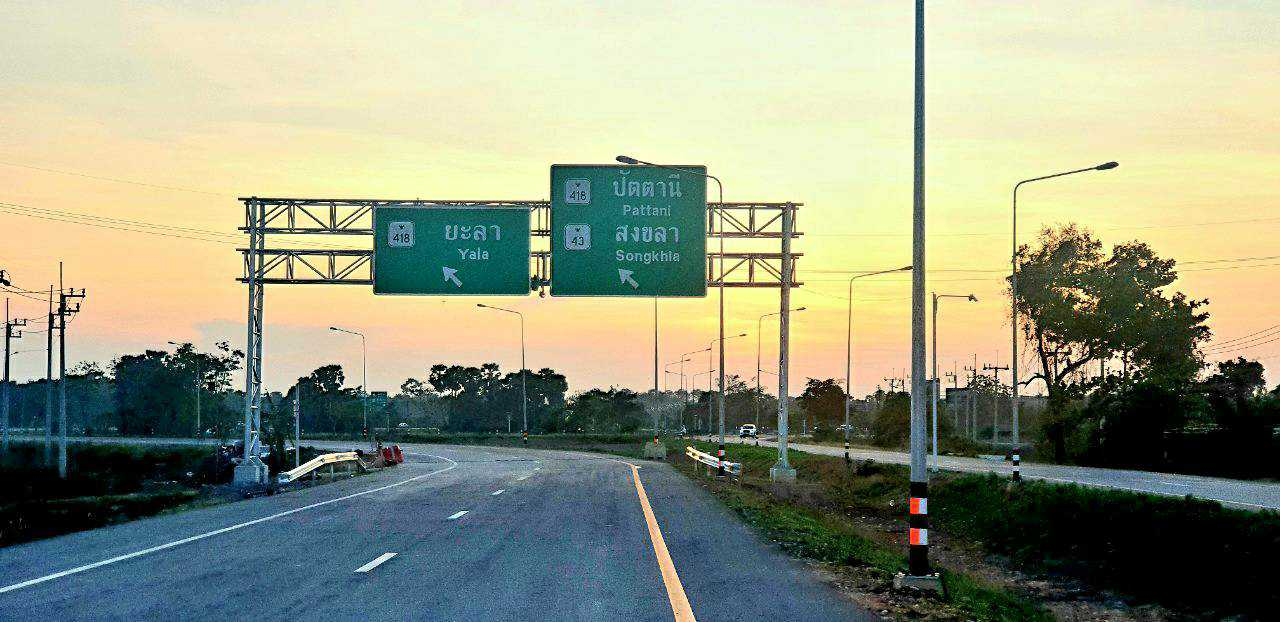
Highway 43 in Pattani Province

Route	km	Name	Destination	Remarks	Province
1-3 Digits
4	1,270.044	Phetkasem Road; Kanchanawanit Road	Bangkok-Sadao Checkpoint (Malaysian border)	AH2, AH123	Bangkok; Nakhon Pathom; Samut Sakhon; Ratchaburi; Phetchaburi; Prachuap Khiri Khan; Chumphon; Ranong; Phang Nga; Krabi; Trang; Phatthalung; Songkhla
4		Cha-am - Pranburi Bypass Road	Cha-am Interchange - Wang Yao Interchange (Cha-am - Pran Buri)	Now part of Highway 37	Phetchaburi; Prachuap Khiri Khan
41	382.616	Asian Road	Chumphon-Phatthalung	AH2	Chumphon; Surat Thani; Nakhon Si Thammarat; Phatthalung
42	262.312	Phetkasem of Pattani-Narathiwat Road; Ramkomut Road; Korean Road	Sadao-Su-ngai Kolok Checkpoint (Malaysian border)	AH18	Songkhla; Pattani; Narathiwat
43	109.152	Asian Road; Hat Yai-Pattani Highway; Pattani Bypass Highway	Hat Yai-Yaring	AH18	Songkhla; Pattani
44	133.172	Southern Road	Ao Luek-Kanchanadit		Krabi; Surat Thani
401	282.963	Tharathibodi Road; Sriwichai Road; Talat Mai Road; Kanchanawithi Road; Pattanakan Khu Khwang Road; Road around Vajiravudh Camp	Takua Pa-Nakhon Si Thammarat		Phang Nga; Surat Thani; Nakhon Si Thammarat
402	48.958	Thepkrasattri Road	Takua Thung-Phuket		Phang Nga; Phuket
403	118.888	Kantang Road	Nakhon Si Thammarat-Kantang		Nakhon Si Thammarat; Trang
404	133.663		Trang-Chalung		Trang; Satun
404		Trang - Palian Road	Sam Yaek - Yong Star	Old routing of Highway 404 before it was extended over Highway 416; now Highway 4371	Trang; Satun
405		Ron Phibun-Phatthalung Road	Ron Phibun-Phatthalung	Now part of Highway 41	Nakhon Si Thammarat; Phatthalung
406	99.890	Yontrakankamthon Road; Satun Thani Road; Sulkanukun Road	Khuan Niang-Tammalang Pier		Songkhla; Satun
407	21.060	Kanchanawanit Road; Saiburi Road	Khlong Wa-Songkhla		Songkhla
408	245.159		Nakhon Si Thammarat-Ban Prakop Checkpoint		Nakhon Si Thammarat; Songkhla
409	34.759	Thesaban 1 Road (Yala)	Naket-Yala		Pattani; Yala
410	153.804	Yarang Road; Sirorot Road; Sukhyang Road	Pattani Betong Checkpoint		Pattani; Yala
410		Sukhyang Road	Khoyae - Kato	Part of Highway 4363	Yala
411		Uttarakit Road	Main Entrance to Krabi	Downgraded to local highway	Krabi
412	0.233		Entrance to Ranong		Ranong
413	5.29	Khokkloy Bypass Road	Tonsae-Thungpho	Downgraded to 4 digit highway/Part of Highway 4303	Phang Nga
414	24.315	Lopburi Ramesuan Road	Nam Krachai-Tha Thon		Songkhla
415	48.161		Na Nuea-Phanom		Krabi; Surat Thani
416		Palian-Chalung Road	Palian-Chalung	Now part of Highway 404	Trang; Satun
417	11.296		Surat Thani Airport-Kholang		Surat Thani
418	35.649	Yarang Bypass Highway	Pattani-Thasap		Pattani; Yala
419	31.255	Trang Ring Road	Ring road around Trang city		Trang
420	31.702	Bang Bai Mai Road; Surat Thani Bypass Road (Tha Kup Intersection - Bang Kung Intersection); Surat Thani Ring Road	Ring road around Surat Thani city		Surat Thani
421	10.517	Wisetmayura Road; Satun Bypass Road	Kanae-Satun		Satun
425	7.183	Southeast Hat Yai Bypass Road, Hat Yai Ring Road	Ban Phru-Hat Yai International Airport	Under construction	Songkhla
4 Digits (40XX)
4001	6.135		Chumphon-Thayang		Chumphon
4002	7.583		Lang Suan - Pak Nam Lang Suan		Chumphon
4003	14.012		Sawi - Bokha		Chumphon
4004		Ruangrat Road	Mueang Ranong - Pak Nam Ranong	Downgraded to local highway	Ranong
4005			Mueang Ranong - Hat Sompaen	Downgraded to local highway	Ranong
4006	68.1		Ratchakrut - Lang Suan		Ranong, Chumphon
4007		Donnok Road	Entrance to Donnok Airport Intersection	Downgraded to local highway	Suratthani
4008	2.002	Tharathibodi Road	Thakham - Km.0 Intersection		Suratthani
4009	146.568	Chan Kasem Road; Poolsiri Road; Vibhavadi Rangsit Road; Surat Thani - Na San Road; Khlong Ha Road; Phra Saeng - Ao Luek Road	Mueang Suratthani - Ao Luek		Suratthani, Krabi
4010	27.55		Kanchanadit - Kham Son		Suratthani
4011	9.004	Raksankit Road	Choeng Samo - Phum Riang		Suratthani
4012	8.832		Huasai-Phraek Mueang		Nakhon Si Thammarat
4013	68.663		Mueang Nakhon Si Thammarat - Hua Sai		Nakhon Si Thammarat
4014	17.53		Khlong Leng - Khanom		Nakhon Si Thammarat
4015	113.717	Karom Road; Ban Song-Nakhon Si Thammarat Road	Ban Tan - Ban Song		Nakhon Si Thammarat; Surat Thani
4016	31.208	Karom Road (Nakhon Si Thammarat-Ban Tan section); Nakhon Si Thammarat-Phrom Khiri Road	Mueang Nakhon Si Thammarat - Nopphitam		Nakhon Si Thammarat
4017			Mueang Nakhon Si Thammarat - Ranot	Now part of Highway 408	Nakhon Si Thammarat; Songkhla
4018	36.791		Thungpo - Pho Thong		Nakhon Si Thammarat; Phatthalung
4019	27.171		Thung Yai - Chang Klang		Nakhon Si Thammarat
4020	1.642	Wichitsongkhram Road	Mueang Phuket - Patong		Phuket
4021	6.473	Chaofa East Road	Mueang Phuket - Chalong Intersection		Phuket
4022	0.488		Wichitsongkhram School - Surakul Stadium		Phuket
4023	8.77	Sakdidet Road	Mueang Phuket - Cape Panwa		Phuket
4024	22.72	Chaloem Phrakiat Road; Chao Fa West Road; Wises Road	Bang Khu - Rawai Beach		Phuket
4025	6.95	Srisunthon Road	Tha Ruea - Choeng Talae		Phuket
4026	4.13		Entrance to Phuket International Airport		Phuket
4027	19.538		Tha Ruea - Mueang Mai		Phuket
4028	8.608	Patak Road	Chalong - Karon Intersection		Phuket
4029	3.236	Phrabarami Road	Kathu - Patong		Phuket
4030	40.540	Don Jom Tao Road; Ban Don - Choeng Talae Road; Srisunthon Road; Thawewong Road; Sirirat Road; Karon Road; Kata Road; Kata-Sai Yuan Road	Thalang - Rawai Beach		Phuket
4031	13.093	Old Airport Road; Thepkrasattri-Naiyang Road	Mud Dok Khao - Phuket International Airport		Phuket
4032	7.696	Rat Bamrung Road	Bang Sai - Tambon		Phang Nga
4033	5.310				Krabi
4034	21.815	Krabi Road; Nong Thale Road (Khlong Jilad-Khao Thong intersection)	mouth of the Krabi River - Khao Thong		Krabi
4035	2.004		Na Chum Het - Khok Maphrao	Possibly now part of Highway 4009	Surat Thani
4036			Highway 4 (Nuea Khlong Intersection) - Laem Kruat	Designation decommissioned	Krabi
4037					Krabi; Surat Thani
4038					Krabi; Nakhon Si Thammarat
4039	4.313		entrance to Ban Na San		Surat Thani
4039			Highway 4 (Ao Luek) - Laem Sak Intersection	Downgraded to rural road	Krabi
4040			Highway 401 (Phanom) - Paklao Intersection	Now part of Highway 415	Krabi
4041					Krabi
4042			Highway 4 (Sai Khao) - Bo Muang	Designation decommissioned	Krabi
4043			Highway 4 (Khlong Phan) - Tha Maphrao	Designation decommissioned	Krabi
4044			Highway 415 (Thap Phut) - Tha Sai Intersection	Designation decommissioned	Phang Nga
4045					
4046					
4047					
4048					
4049					
4050			Highway 4047 (Ban Rae) - Thale Noi Lake	Designation decommissioned	Phatthalung
4051					
4052					
4053					
4054	10.439	Padang Besar Road	Sadao - Padang Besar Checkpoint		Songkhla
4055	64.305	Ra-ngae Makha Road	Narathiwat - Sukhirin		Narathiwat
4055			Dusong Yo - Katoh		Narathiwat
4056	53.238	Sungai Padi Road	Narathiwat-Su-ngai Kolok		Narathiwat
4057	25.517	Charoen Khet Road	Su-ngai Kolok - Buke Ta Checkpoint (Malaysian border)		Narathiwat
4057			Tak Bai - Su-ngai Kolok	Part of Highway 42, Kilometers zero relocated to Su-ngai Kolok.	Narathiwat
4058	31.386	Makhapinnit Road	Yi-ngo - Rueso		Narathiwat
4059			Entrance to Ranong Pier	Designation decommissioned	Ranong
4060	50.833	Ratrat Phatthana Road	Saiburi - Si Sakhon		Pattani; Yala; Narathiwat
4061	36.842	Lamyai 2 Road; Yarang-Panare Highway	Yarang - Panare		Pattani
4062	41.162		Buketa - Sawonok		Narathiwat
4062			Betong - Km.17 Intersection - Chulabhorn Development Village 10 - Sukhirin	Part of Highway 4326 (Betong - Km.17 Intersection section), Highway 4325 (Pak Bang - Chulabhorn Development Village 10 section) and unpaved section to Sukhirin is probably Highway 4325 in future.	Yala, Narathiwat
4063	9.917	Yala - Kota Road	Paramitae - Ban Kotabaru		Yala
4064		Sirorot Road, Sirorot Sai 2 Road, Sai 15 Road	Yala Hospital - Malayu Bangkok Intersection	Downgraded to Local Highway with under responsibility of Yala City Municipality	Yala
4065	10.760		Ban Niang - Yaha		Yala
4066	54.679		Ban Kotabaru - Ban Thon		Yala, Narathiwat
4067	28.081		Ban Kotabaru - Rueso		Yala; Narathiwat
4068	6.258		Lammai - Lamphaya		Yala
4069		Yaha - Tachi Road	Asen-Tachi	Designation decommissioned	Yala
4070	29.733	Yaha - Tachi Road	Yaha - Bala		Yala
4071	24.160		Ban Kotabaru - Phiten		Yala; Pattani
4072			Na Pradu-Sai Khao Waterfall	Downgraded to Rural Road PN.3060	Pattani
4073				Unknown	
4074	16.100		Kalapho - Paku		Pattani
4075	7.000		Tolang - Ban Nok		Pattani
4076	1.500		Ban Mai - Ban Pase Puteh		Pattani
4077	32.079		Yaha - Bannang Sata		Yala
4078			Chalung-Palian	Became a portion of Highway 416 (now Highway 404)	Satun; Trang
4079		Talat Lang Road	Surat Thani-Bang Kung	Downgraded to local highway	Surat Thani
4080		Chaloem Phrakiat Road	Entrance to Ranong Municipality Control Area		Ranong
4081	16.15		Tha Nangphrom-Chongkae		Phatthalung
4082	11.335	Witunuthit 1 Road	Yala - Tohpakae		Yala
4083	2.887		Entrance to Ranot		Songkhla
4084	14.173	Suriya Pradit Road, Chaturongrasamee Road	Entrance to Narathiwat	Former portion of Highway 42 (Puta Intersection - Narathiwat Clock Tower Roundabout section)	Narathiwat
4084			Sapom Intersection - Tak Bai	Part of Highway 42 (Sapom intersection - Tak Bai intersection section) and Highway 4327 (Entrance to Tak Bai section)	Narathiwat
4085	49.470		Pak Nam Thepha - Bannang Dama		Songkhla, Yala
4086	0.280		Entrance to Chana		Songkhla
4086		Chana - Pattani Road	Chana Intersection - Don Yang Intersection	Part of Highway 43	Songkhla, Pattani
4087			entrance to Khuan Mit Intersection	Downgraded to local highway with under control of Songkhla Provincial Administration Organization	Songkhla
4088			entrance to Hanthao Train Station	Downgraded to local highway PT.T1-0061	Phatthalung
4089	1.825	Thasap Road	Entrance to West Yala		Yala
4090	43.466		Noppring-Hin Dan		Phang Nga
4091	71.858		Ranong-Thung Tako		Ranong, Chumphon
4092	35.000		Raman - Mayo		Yala, Pattani
4093			Bannang Dama - Bannang Sata	Now part of Highway 4077 (Bannang Sata - Patae section), Highway 4176 (Patae - Bala section) and Highway 4070 (Bala - Bannang Dama section).	Yala
4094	30.341		Bolo-Paknang		Nakhon Si Thammarat
4095	20.671		Saba Yoi - Khao Daeng		Songkhla
4096			Khao Peep-Paknam Tako	Downgraded to Rural Road CP.2063	Chumphon
4097			Lang Suan-Bang Nam Chip	Designation decommissioned	Chumphon
4098	7.15		Khao Mathri-Sairi Beach		Chumphon
4099	6.5		Khao Muang-Wat Laem Sai		Chumphon
4 Digits (41XX)
4100	10.669		Entrance to Khiri Rat Nikhom		Surat Thani
4101				Unknown	
4102					
4103					
4104					
4105		Chaithale - Khao Yai			Nakhon Si Thammarat
4106					
4107	11.552		Maruebo Tok - Tanyong Mas		Narathiwat
4107			Rueso - Maruebo Tok	Part of Highway 4058, Kilometers zero relocated in Maruebo Tok.	Narathiwat
4108				Unknown	
4109				Unknown	
4110					
4111	0.075	Sulakanukun Road	Entrance to Koh Nok Pier	Former portion of Highway 4183	Satun
4111			Highway 4053 (Khuan Niang) - Pak Cha intersection	Now part of Highway 406	Songkhla
4112					
4113	2.850		Entrance to Ban Prakob		Songkhla
4113			Na Thawi - Ban Prakob	Part of Highway 408, Kilometers zero relocated to Ban Prakob Intersection.	Songkhla
4114					
4115	16.670		Sukhirin - Waeng		Narathiwat
4115			Dusong Yo - Sukhirin	Part of Highway 4055, Kilometers zero relocated to Sukhirin.	Narathiwat
4116					
4117			Rattaphum - Khlong Ngae	Mostly are part of Highway 4187 and some rural roads.	Songkhla
4118					
4119					
4120			Highway 4 (Mae Khri) - Loh Chang Kra		
4121					
4122					
4123					
4124					
4125					
4126				Unknown	
4127				Unknown	
4128				Unknown	
4129					
4130			Highway 4 (Kaper) - Ban Na intersection		
4131			Hat Yai - Khuan Mit Intersection	Now part of Highway 43	Songkhla
4132			Highway 4016 (Phromlok) - Phromlok Waterfall Intersection		
4133					
4134					
4135	10.187	Airport Road	Entrance to Hat Yai International Airport		Songkhla
4136	19.097	Khok Khian Road	Narathiwat - Kodo		Narathiwat, Pattani
4136		Khok Khian Road	Pase Puteh - Talok Kraithong	Part of Highway 4337 (Pamai (Pase Puteh) - Chomwiw section) and Local Highway with under responsibility of Mai Kaen District.	Pattani
4137					
4138					
4139					
4140					
4141					
4142					
4143					
4144					
4145					
4146			Highway 407 junction (Nam Krachai) - Highway 4083 (Khao Daeng)	Now part of Highway 408	
4147	4.570		Lam Kaen - Tap Lamu		Phang Nga
4148				Unknown	
4149				Unknown	
4150			Highway 408 intersection (Hua Sai) - Pak Muang		
4151	103.693		Highway 408 (Bo Lo) - Highway 4038 (Lam Thap)		Nakhon Si Thammarat; Trang; Krabi
4152					
4153					
4154					
4155	10.896		Bacho - Ban Thon		Narathiwat
4156					
4157	27.250	Ramkomut Road; Thasedet Road; Pattani Coastal Highway	Lahan - Panare		Pattani
4157		Pattani Coastal Highway	Laem Tachi - Panare	Part of Local Highway with under responsibility of Pattani Provincial Administration Organization (Laem Tachi - Talok Kapor section), Remaining sections of Highway 4157 are Designation decommissioned due to damages from heavy waves.	Pattani
4158					
4159					
4160					
4161					
4162					
4163					
4164					
4165					
4166				Unknown	
4167	12.076		Pamai - Tonsai		Pattani-Narathiwat
4168	8.105		Tonsai - Talodueraman		Narathiwat, Pattani
4169					
4170					
4171			Bo Phut - Laem Plai		Surat Thani
4172			Hin Lad Waterfall - Lipa Yai		Surat Thani
4173			Ban Thurian - Ban Thale		Surat Thani
4174					
4175			Highway 4090 - Kapong Intersection	Downgraded to Rural Road 4038	Phang Nga
4176	14.678		Patae-Bala	Former section of Highway 4093	Yala
4177					
4178					
4179				Unknown	
4180			Highway 41 - Phru Phi Intersection		
4181					
4182			Highway 41 - Laem Ton Intersection		
4183	0.156		Entrance to Satun Customs House		Satun
4183		Sulkanukun Road	Satun - Tammalang Pier	Part of Highway 406	Satun
4184	21.850	Wang Prachan Road	Khuan Don - Wang Prachan Checkpoint		Satun
4185					
4186					
4187					
4188					
4189					
4190				Unknown	
4191					
4192					
4193	21.834	Tokweng 2 Road	Su-ngai Padi - Bueloh Intersection		Narathiwat
4194					
4195					
4196			Highway 4083 intersection (Chedi Ngam) - Koh Yai	Downgraded to local highway S.K.T. 1-0059 under the responsibility of Songkhla Provincial Administrative Organization	Songkhla
4197					
4198					
4199					
4 Digits (42XX)
4200		Watchara Road	Highway 4034 - Highway 4	Downgraded to local highway	Krabi
4201					
4202					
4203					
4204					
4205			Highway 4 intersection (Ao Luk Noi) - Bagan		
4206					
4207	25.340		Sukhirin - Tomo		Narathiwat
4208	6.225		Entrance to Bang Klam Railway Station		Songkhla
4209					
4210			Entrance to Pattani Pier	Downgraded to Local Highway PN. T1-0017 with under responsibility of Pattani Provincial Administration Organization	Pattani
4211					
4212					
4213					
4214					
4215					
4216	5.911		Entrance to Thaksin Ratchaniwet Palace		Narathiwat
4217	22.676		Dusong Yo - Ai-tako		Narathiwat
4218					
4219					
4220					
4221					
4222					
4223					
4224					
4225					
4226					
4227					
4228					
4229					
4230					
4231					
4232					
4233					
4234					
4235					
4236					
4237					
4238					
4239					
4240					
4241	15.853		Sukhirin - Ai-tako		Narathiwat
4242					
4243	40.010	Phichai Songkhram Road	Sadao - Ban Sathon		Songkhla
4244	21.781		Betong Checkpoint - Ban Saho		Yala
4245					
4246					
4247					
4248					
4249					
4250					
4251					
4252					
4253					
4254					
4255					
4256					
4257					
4258					
4259					
4260					
4261					
4262					
4263					
4264					
4265					
4266	13.373		Sako - Kia		Narathiwat
4267					
4268					
4269					
4270					
4271	42.480		Si Sakhon - Ai-tako		Narathiwat
4272	19.350		Yuenang - Khlong Ching	Former section of Highway 4070 (Yuenang - Bala section).	Yala
4273	33.425		Taling Chan - Si Sakhon		Yala, Narathiwat
4274					
4275					
4276					
4277					
4278					
4279					
4280					
4281					
4282					
4283					
4284					
4285					
4286					
4287					
4288					
4289					
4290					
4291					
4292					
4293					
4294					
4295					
4296	1.097	Nong Chik Road	Entrance to West Pattani	Former section of Highway 42	Pattani
4297	1.2	Ramkomut Road	Entrance to Ban Dee	Former section of Highway 42	Pattani
4298	0.571	Ramkomut Road	Entrance to East Yaring (Hospital)	Former section of Highway 42	Pattani
4299	0.262		Entrance to Cho-koyae	Former portion of Rural Road PN.2033	Pattani
4 Digits (43XX)
4300	1.4		Entrance to Yi-ngo	Former section of Highway 42	Narathiwat
4301					
4302					
4303					
4304					
4305					
4306					
4307					
4308					
4309					
4310					
4311					
4312					
4313					
4314					
4315					
4316					
4317					
4318					
4319					
4320					
4321	3.127		Manang Tayo - Khoksumu	Former position of Highway 4056	Narathiwat
4322	5.527		Entrance to Cho-airong	Former position of Highway 4056	Narathiwat
4323	1.103		Entrance to East Su-ngai Padi	Former position of Highway 4056	Narathiwat
4324	0.173		Entrance to Panare	Former position of Highway 4061	Pattani
4325	9.800 (21.950)		Pakbang - Chulabhorn Development Village 10	Former section of Highway 4062	Yala
4326	27.625	Rattanakit Road	Betong-17 Km House	Former section of Highway 4062	Yala
4327	6.460		Entrance to Tak Bai	Former position of Highway 4084	Narathiwat
4328	3.532		Hua Khao - Khao Tanyong	Former position of Highway 4084	Narathiwat
4329					
4330					
4331					
4332					
4333					
4334	1.559		Entrance to Bang Ma Ruat	Former position of Highway 4157	Pattani
4335	0.226		Entrance to Khae Khae Beach		Pattani
4336	0.470		Entrance to Chomwiw Beach		Pattani
4337	1.355		Pamai - Chomwiw Intersection	Former position of Highway 4136	Pattani
4338					
4339					
4340					
4341					
4342					
4343					
4344					
4345					
4346					
4347					
4348					
4349					
4350					
4351	11.354		Ai-suere - Chanae	Former section of Highway 4271.	Narathiwat
4352					
4353					
4354	0.064	Nong Chik Road	Entrance to Don Rak	Former position of Highway 4296 and Highway 42	Pattani
4355	0.251	Ramkomut Road	Entrance to East Pattani	Original portion of Highway 42	Pattani
4356	0.426		Entrance to North Pattani		Pattani
4357	0.435	Ramkomut Road	Entrance to Krue Se Mosque	Original portion of Highway 42	Pattani
4358	0.120		Entrance to Buecho		Pattani
4359	0.120		Entrance to Bang Pu		Pattani
4360					
4361					
4362					
4363	11.058	Sukyang Road	Khoyae - Kato	Former portion of Highway 410	Yala
4364	0.720		Entrance to Buketa	Former position of Highway 4057	Narathiwat
4365					
4366					
4367					
4368	3.328		Mai Fat - Sam Yaek	Former position of Highway 4057	Narathiwat
4369	5.496		Entrance to 2nd Sadao Checkpoint		Songkhla
4370	0.420		Entrance to Sakom Pakbang	Original portion of Highway 4086 and Highway 43	Songkhla
4371	8.959		Sam Yaek - Yong Star	Former routing of Highway 404	Trang
4372	0.495		Entrance to Wang Yao		Prachuap Khiri Khan
4373	13.378		Nong Hin - Singkhon Checkpoint	Formerly Rural Road PK.1039	Prachuap Khiri Khan

== Department of Highway signage ==
=== Route number signs ===
DOH signs for public highways (ทางหลวง, thang luang) are white squares with a black garuda (ครุฑ khrut) centered above the route number.

Arunprasert Road

Signs near the beginning of a route may display the highway's name on a white rectangle above or below the square.

Bypass marker

Highways bypassing city centres bear the principal route number marked "Bypass" in Thai (เลี่ยงเมือง), and sometimes also in English.

== Rural highways ==
Rural highways do not follow the regional numbering scheme, but follow their own system:

- Routes beginning with 1 begin from a single-digit highway
- Routes beginning with 2 begin from a two-digit highway
- Routes beginning with 3 begin from a three-digit highway
- Routes beginning with 4 begin from a four-digit highway
- Routes beginning with 5 begin from a rural highway, local highway or expressway
- Routes beginning with 6 begin from an important place (e.g a school, temple, district or sub-district)
- Routes beginning with 7 are entrance roads to the Royal Initiative Project
- A three-digit numbered route is a community bridge and connecting road

Signs may be black-on-white (for highway areas) or gold-on-blue (for rural highway areas), with a two-letter province designation prefixed to the road number.

SK.3015

Depicted is SK. 3015, for a rural road in Songkhla Province. The rural road network measures some 35,000 kilometres (22,000 mi), about 82 percent of which is paved. The Department of Rural Roads of the Ministry of Transport takes care of the maintenance of all the rural roads in Thailand.

== Kilometer stones ==
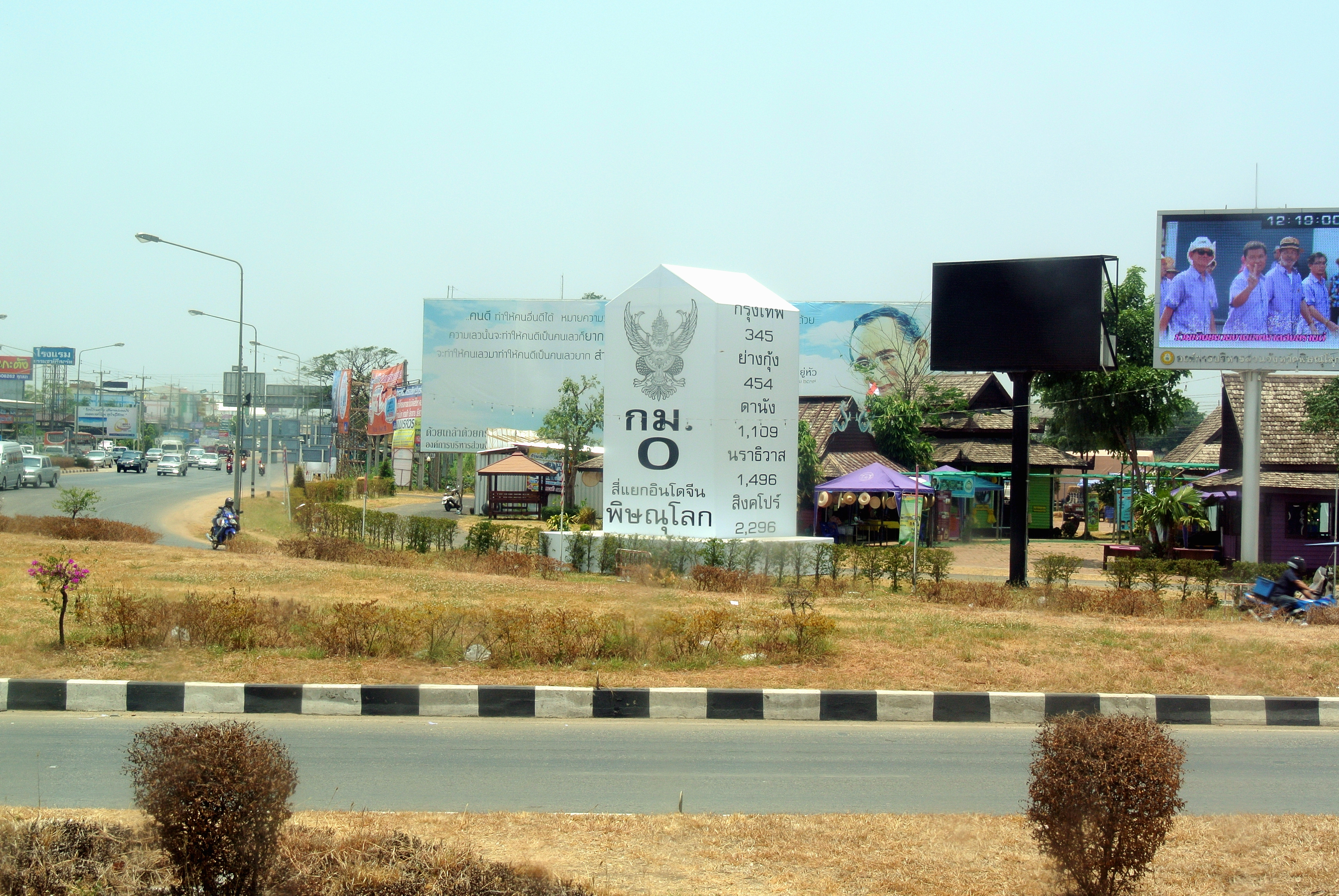
A kilometer zero stone in northern Thailand

Milestone as goal is lakh chai (หลักชัย); also see Lak Mueang, Lakh.

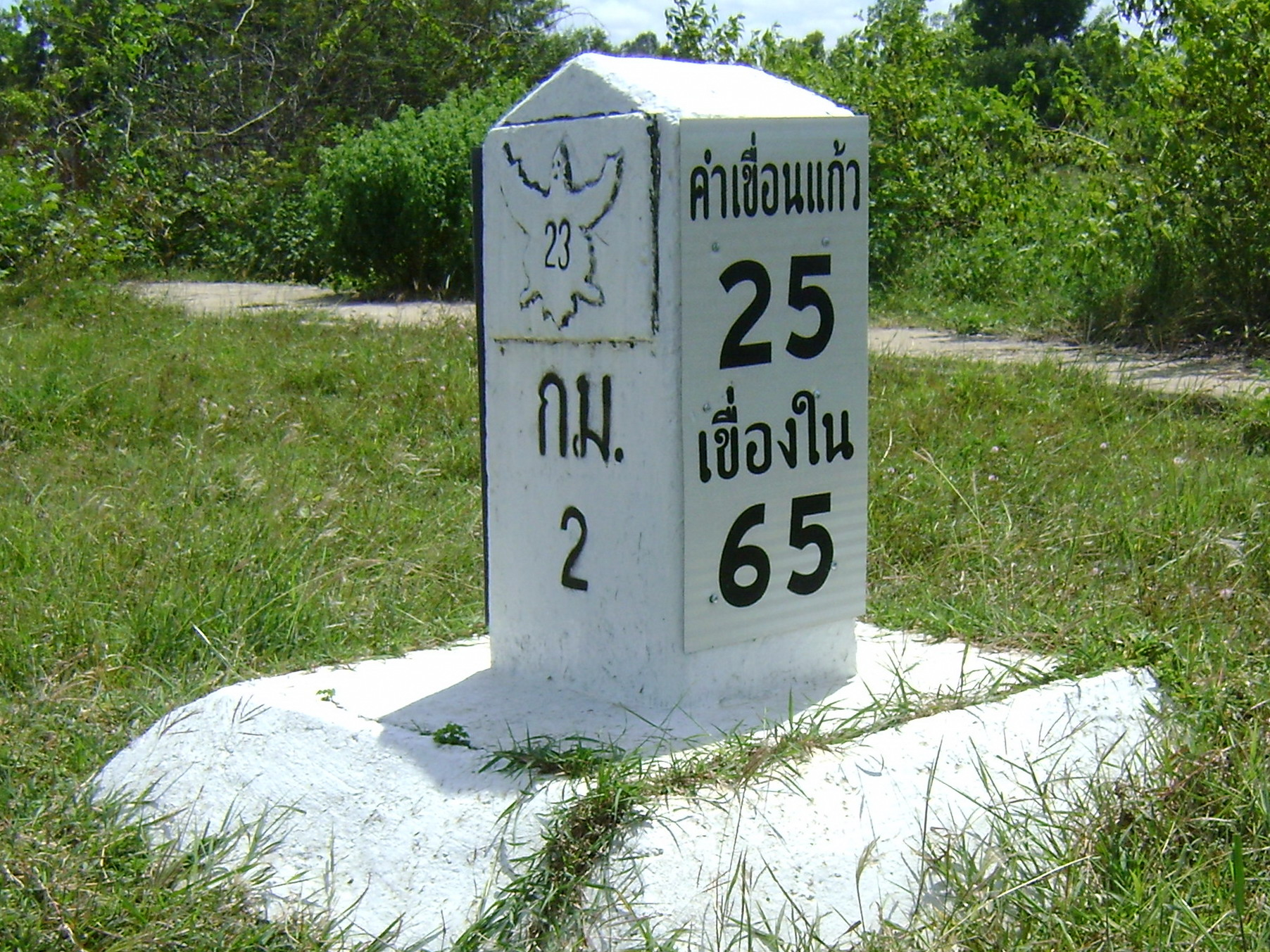

Lak or Lakh kilomet (หลักกิโลเมตร) single-carriageway kilometer stone facings display the route number on the outline of a garuda. Some kilometer stones also display the route number on top. Those located to the left of the carriageway display kilometers remaining to the road's beginning at kilometer 0. As seen on the right from the opposite lane, the kilometer stones ascend in value as one proceeds away from kilometer 0. On edges facing traffic, DOH kilometer stones usually show distances remaining to the next two towns, (amphoe seats, or provincial capitals.) Some edges, such as the one depicted to the left, have retroreflector panels. Dual carriageway kilometer stones or posts in the median strip show only the kilometer number.

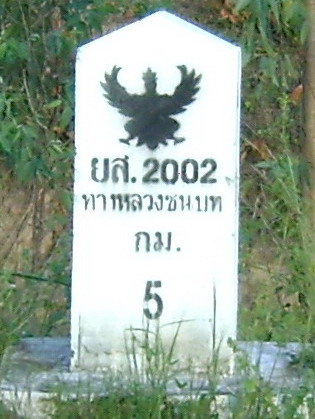
DORR milestones show the kilometer number, and the edges may show distances remaining to the next two villages.

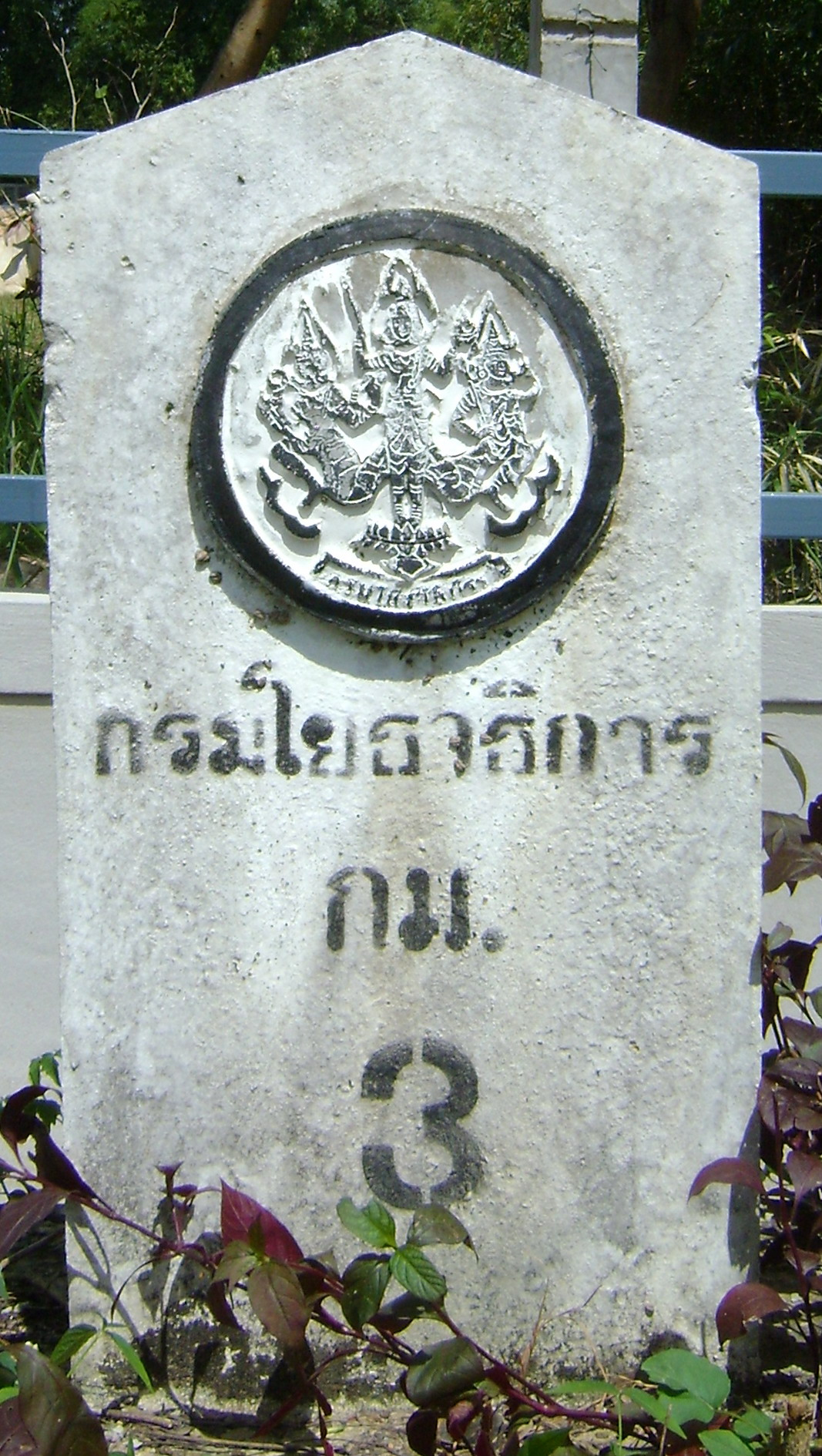
Older roads built by the Ministry of the Interior Public Works Department (กรมโยธาธิการ กระทรวงมหาดไทย) have only departmental insignia and kilometer number and do not show distances on their edges.

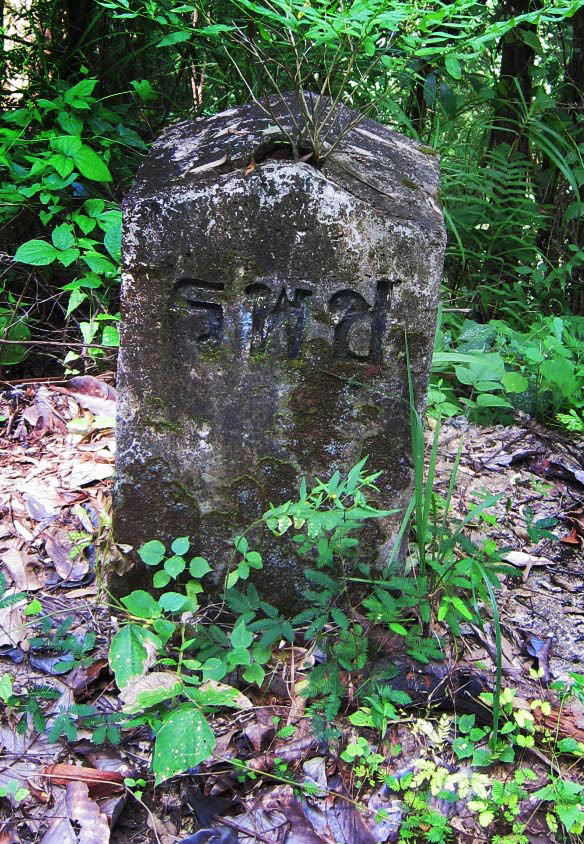
This type of kilometer stone is sometimes found on older rural highways built during a period of rural development several decades ago. They are marked with the Thai characters รพช, an abbreviation for Rengrat Pattana Chonabot (Thai: เร่งรัดพัฒนาชนบท) which, roughly translated, means "Rapid Rural Development".

== See also ==
- Thai motorway network
- Road signs in Thailand
- List of motor vehicle deaths in Thailand by year
