= Malaysia–Thailand border =

International border

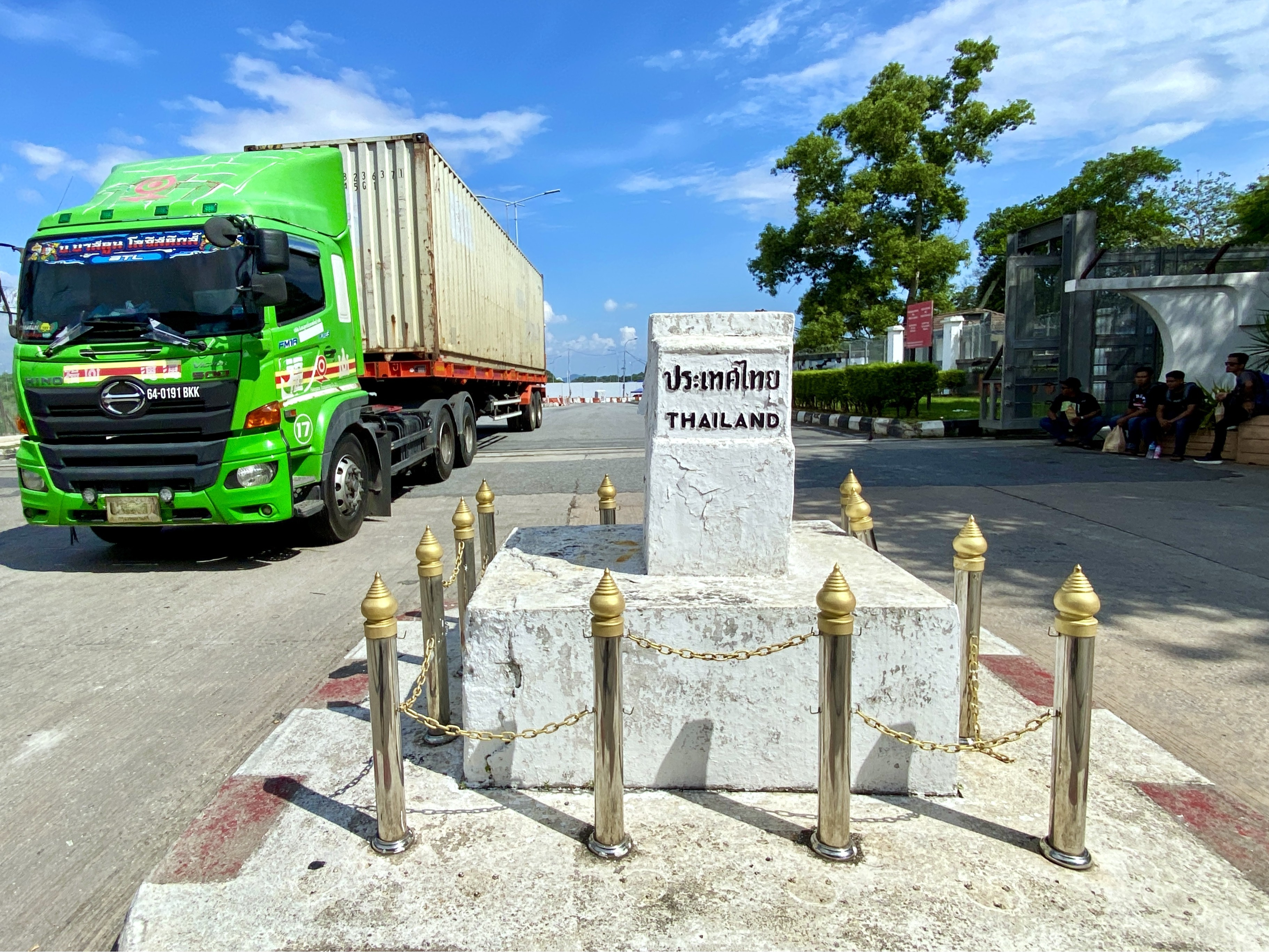
- Malaysia-Thailand boundary stone no.22 at old border crossing of the Bukit Kayu Hitam-Sadao border crossing.

Characteristics
- Entities: Malaysia Thailand
- Length: 595 kilometres

History
- Established: 10 March 1909
- Current shape: 1909
- Treaties: • Anglo-Siamese Treaty of 1909

The Malaysia–Thailand border divides the sovereign states of Malaysia and Thailand and consists of a land boundary running for 658 km (409 mi) across the Malay Peninsula and maritime boundaries in the Straits of Malacca and the Gulf of Thailand/South China Sea. The Golok River forms the easternmost 95 km stretch of the land border.

The land border is based on the 1909 treaty between Thailand (then known as Siam) and the British which had started to exert their influence over the northern Malay states of Kedah, Kelantan, Perlis, and Terengganu in the early 20th century, states which were previously under Siamese control. Currently, the international border forms part of the borders of four Malaysian states (Kedah, Kelantan, Perak, and Perlis), and four Thai provinces (Narathiwat, Satun, Songkhla, and Yala).

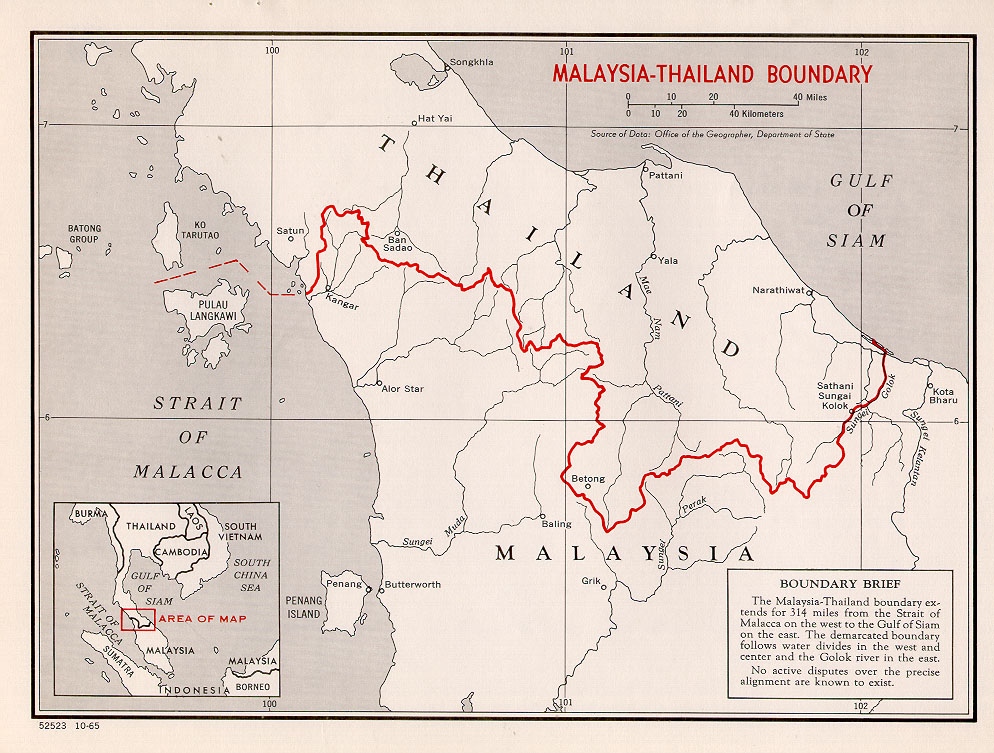
Map of the Malaysia-Thailand border

Malaysia and Thailand have territorial sea and continental shelf boundary agreements for the Straits of Malacca which were signed in 1979 and 1971, respectively. The 1979 agreement also included Indonesia as a signatory as it also determined the common continental shelf border tripoint for the three countries. The 1979 agreement also established the territorial sea boundary in the Gulf of Thailand while a separate memorandum of understanding signed in 1979 established a short continental shelf boundary in the area. The boundary beyond that agreed is disputed because of overlapping claims over the seabed. The overlapping claims led to the establishment of a joint development area in 1990 where both countries agreed to share mineral resources in a 7,250 square km wedge-shaped area.

== Land border ==
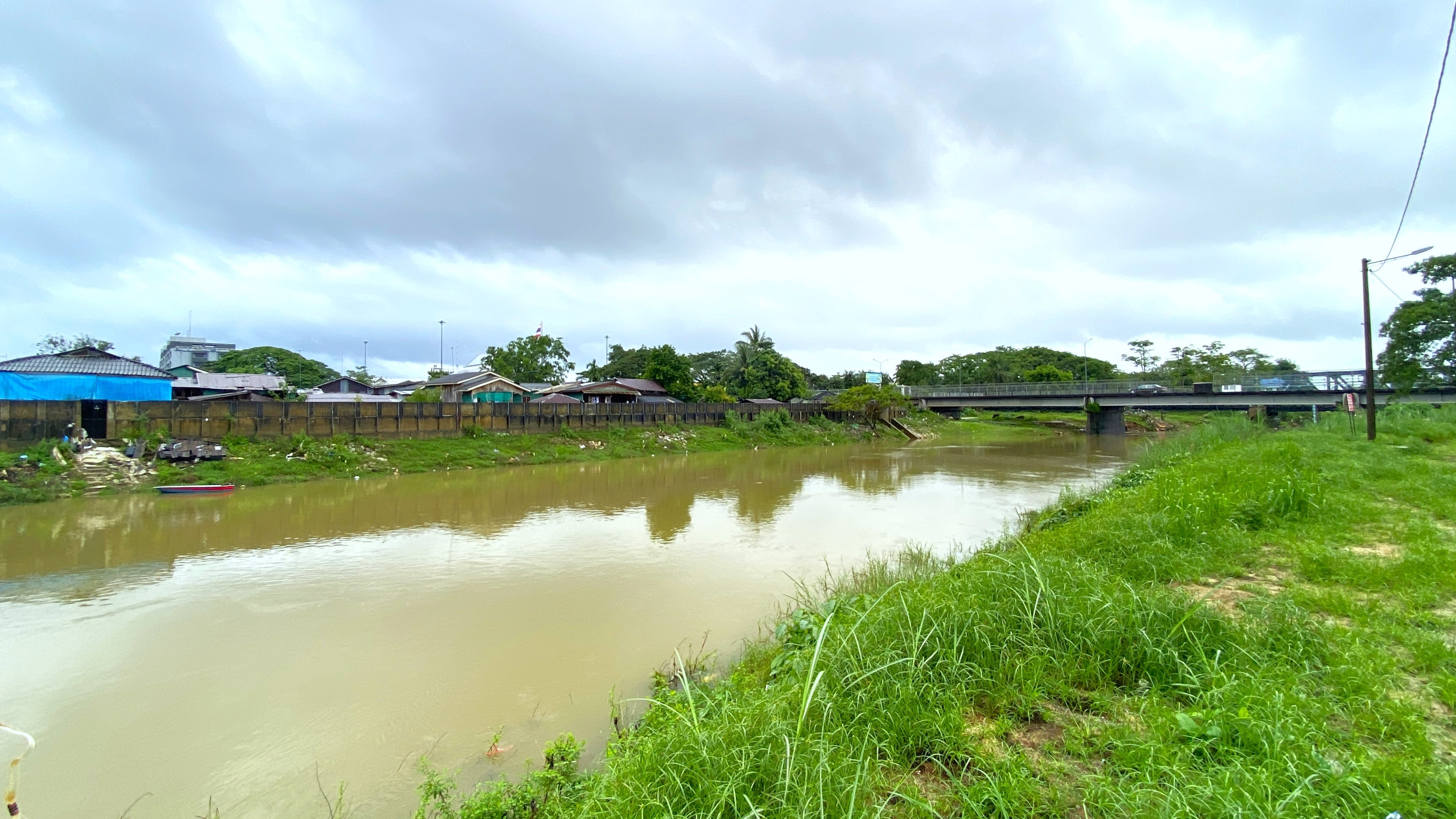
The Golok River, seen here near the Rantau Panjang-Sungai Kolok border crossing, forms the easternmost portion of the Malaysia-Thailand border.

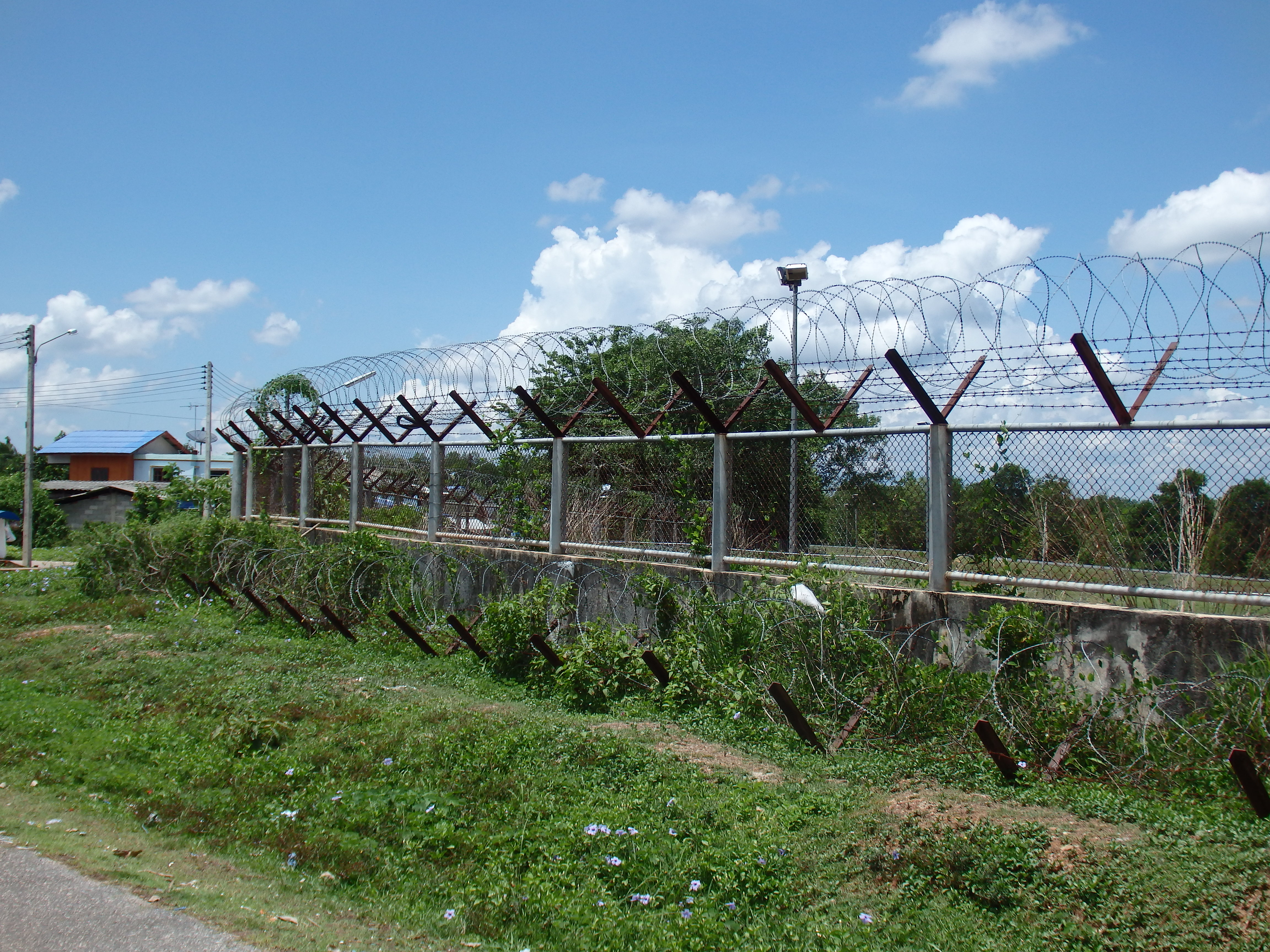
Malaysian boundary wall near Padang Besar, Malaysia

The 658-kilometre Malaysia-Thailand land boundary consists of a 552-kilometre section on land running along the watershed of several mountain ranges in northern Peninsular Malaysia and southern Thailand, and 106 kilometres running along the thalweg of the Golok River (Malay: Sungai Golok).

From west to east, the border begins at a point which lies just north of the Perlis River estuary as defined in the schedule of the Anglo-Siamese Treaty of 1909 where the westernmost land boundary terminus was to be at "the most seaward point of the northern bank of the estuary of the Perlis River".

The treaty then states that the border moves northward from this point to the Sayun Range, an extension of the Si Thammarat Mountains of Thailand, for about 15 miles (24 km) before heading eastward along the watershed of Thailand's Lam Yai River and Malaysia's Perlis River towards the ridge of the Kedah-Singgora mountains where it moves southwards along the ridgeline until it reaches the watershed for the Perak and Pattani Rivers. Mountain peaks along this section of the border include Lata Papalang.

The border then moves eastward across the northern part of Peninsular Malaysia's Main Range (Malay: Banjaran Titiwangsa) along the watershed of Malaysia's Perak River and Pergau River (in Kelantan) on one hand, and Thailand's Pattani and Sai Buri Rivers on the other until it reaches Jeli Hill (Malay: Bukit Jeli). Among the mountain peaks located along this section of the border are Kobeh Hill (Malay: Bukit Kobeh), which is the southernmost point of Thailand, and Ulu Titi Basah.

At Bukit Jeli, an 8.5 km stretch of the border remains disputed by both countries (see below).

From Bukit Jeli, the boundary follows the Golok River until the river mouth at Kuala Tabar, a distance of 95 km. The border follows the deepest part or thalweg of the river.

=== Survey and demarcation ===
Work to survey and demarcate the watershed boundary began on 6 July 1973 and was completed, except for the 8.5 kilometre disputed section at Jeli Hill, on 26 September 1985. As for the Golok River section, work to survey the boundary began on 1 November 2000 and was completed on 30 September 2009.

=== Barrier ===
In the 1970s, both Malaysia and Thailand constructed walls along their common border, mostly in Perlis/Satun and Perlis/Songkhla as well as Kedah/Songkhla portions of the border to curb smuggling. The walls were of concrete, steel, and topped barbed wire as well as iron fencing at other stretches. As both countries constructed their walls on their own territory, a strip of "no man's land" about 10 m wide was created and this strip of land became a convenient refuge for smugglers (not all smuggling was deterred by the wall) and drug runners.

In 2001, the two countries agreed to construct just one wall along the border which would be just inside Thai territory. The new border wall is 2.5 m high and made of a concrete lower half and steel fencing on the upper half. At the base, barbed wire runs along the length of the wall. The reason given for the construction of the wall was to curb smuggling and encroachment. However, security concerns arising from the South Thailand insurgency in the late 1990s and early 2000s have also been an impetus for the barrier's construction.

== Maritime border ==
Malaysia and Thailand share maritime borders in two areas: in the Straits of Malacca and in the Gulf of Thailand/South China Sea.

=== Straits of Malacca ===
At the western terminus of the land boundary, the 1909 Anglo-Siamese treaty determines the start of the maritime boundary as:

With regard to the islands close to the west coast, those lying to the north of the parallel of latitude where the most seaward point of the north bank of the estuary of the Perlis River (the western terminus of the Malaysia-Thailand land boundary) touches the sea shall remain to Siam, and those lying to the south of the parallel shall become British."
The island known as Pulau Langkawi, together with all the islets south of the mid-channel between Tarutao and Langkawi, and all the islands south of Langkawi shall become British. Tarutao and the islets to the north of mid-channel shall remain to Siam.

The territorial sea boundary agreement between the two countries signed on 24 October 1979 determined the mid-channel point between Langkawi and Tarutao to be at 6°28′30″N 99°39′12″E which was made the eastern starting point of the territorial sea boundary. Both countries also have a continental shelf boundary agreement for this segment of their maritime boundary. The agreement, signed 21 December 1978, included Indonesia as a signatory to enable the establishment of the common tripoint at 5°57′0″N 98°1′30″E.

Point	Latitude (N)	Longitude (E)	Remarks
Territorial sea border end and turning points
1	6° 28'.5	99° 39'.2	
2	6° 30'.2	99° 33'.4	
3	6° 28'.9	99° 30'.7	
4	6° 18'.4	99° 27'.5	
Indonesia-Malaysia-Thailand common point
CP	5° 57'.0	98° 1'.5	The border is a straight line connecting the common point with Point 1 below
Outer limit border turning point coordinates
1	6° 18'.0	99° 6'.7	The border connects to the common point above via a straight line
2	6° 16'.3	99° 19'.3	
3	6° 18'.4	99° 27'.5	This point is the same as Point 4 of the territorial sea border

=== Gulf of Thailand/South China Sea ===
Agreements

The 1909 Anglo-Siamese Treaty states that the maritime boundary between the two countries as follows:

"All islands adjacent to the eastern States of Kelantan and Terengganu, south of the parallel of latitude drawn from the point where the Sungei Golok reaches the coast at a place called Kuala Tabar, shall be transferred to Great Britain, and all islands to the north of that parallel shall remain to Siam."

Subsequently, the two governments signed several agreements over their common maritime boundary in the Gulf of Thailand and South China Sea. The 1973 continental shelf boundary agreement between the two governments only covered the Straits of Malacca segment and did not cover the border in the Gulf of Thailand but on 24 October 1979, an agreement and a memorandum of understanding were signed to determine the common maritime boundary of the two countries in the Gulf of Thailand. The first agreement established the territorial sea boundary from the mouth of the Golok River at 6°14′30″N 102°5′36″E to 6°27′30″N 102°10′0″E. The MOU established the continental shelf boundary from the northern end-point to 6°50′0″N 102°21′12″E with one turning point in between.

The boundary beyond the northern end-point is subject to dispute (see Disputes section below). However, both countries have come to an agreement to put aside the border dispute and allow for the joint exploitation of natural resources of the disputed area. The two countries signed a Memorandum of Understanding for the Establishment of a Joint Authority for the Exploitation of the Resources of the Sea-Bed in a Defined Area of the Continental Shelf of the Two Countries in the Gulf of Thailand on 21 February 1979, followed by an Agreement on the Constitution and Other Matters Relating to the Establishment of the Malaysia-Thailand Joint Authority on 30 May 1990 establishing a joint development area (JDA). Both agreements do not settle disputed maritime border and sovereignty issue of the disputed area and the countries continue staking their overlapping continental shelf claims.

Malaysia's 1979 map and Thailand's EEZ proclamation

In December 1979 just after the two countries signed the MOU on the joint development area, Malaysia published a map showing its territorial sea and continental shelf and continued to assert its sovereignty over the entire joint development area. Malaysia's continental shelf boundary on the map corresponds with the western and northern limit of the joint development area.

On 16 February 1988, Thailand issued a royal proclamation to establish its exclusive economic zone boundary with Malaysia, establishing the limits of its claims in the disputed area. The boundary follows the eastern boundary of the Joint Development Area.

A small triangle in the northern portion of the joint development area is also subjected to an overlapping claim by Vietnam. In 1999, Malaysia, Thailand, and Vietnam agreed to apply the joint development principles to this area. See section below.

Point	Latitude (N)	Longitude (E)	Remarks
Territorial sea border end and turning points
1	6° 14'.5	102° 5'.6	
2	6° 27'.5	102° 10'.0	
Continental shelf border end and turning points
1	6° 27'.5	102° 10'.0	Same point as northern terminus of the territorial sea border, also Point 47 on Malaysia's 1979 continental shelf claim map
2	6° 27'.8	102° 9'.6	Same as Point 46 on Malaysia's 1979 continental shelf claim map
3	6° 50'.0	102° 21'.2	Same as Point 45 on Malaysia's 1979 continental shelf claim map
Continental shelf border end and turning points claimed by Malaysia
45	06° 50'.0	102° 21'.2	Same point as the northern terminus of the agreed continental shelf border; also Point A of Joint Development Area.
44	07° 10'.25	102° 29'.0	Same as Point B of Joint Development Area
43	07° 49'.0	103° 02'.5	Same as Point C of Joint Development Area
Exclusive economic zone border end and turning points claimed by Thailand
1	6° 14'.5	102° 5'.6	Southern terminus of territorial sea boundary
2	6° 27'.5	102° 10'.0	Northern terminus of territorial sea boundary and southern terminus of agreed continental shelf border; same as Point 47 on Malaysia's 1979 map
3	6° 27'.8	102° 9'.6	Same as Point 46 on Malaysia's 1979 map
4	06° 50'.0	102° 21'.2	Northern terminus of the agreed continental shelf border; same as Point 45 on Malaysia's 1979 map; also Point A of Joint Development Area.
5	06° 53'.0	102° 34'.0	Same as Point G of Joint Development Area
6	07° 03'.0	103° 06'.0	Same as Point F of Joint Development Area
7	07°20'.0	103° 39'.0	Same as Point E of Joint Development Area
8	07° 22'.0	103° 42'.5	Same as Point D of Joint Development Area, located on Malaysia's continental shelf border between Point 43 and Point 42 on 1979 map

== History ==
The border between Thailand or Siam and the sultanates of the Malay Peninsula (Peninsular Malaysia today) has varied throughout history. The southern part of today Thailand has always been populated by Malays and traditional Malay sultanates of Kedah (of which Perlis, Setul was part), Kelantan, Pattani (which consist of the areas of Singgora, Yala, Ligor) and Terengganu came under Siamese influence in the 19th century. The Malay states immediately to the south, namely Perak and Pahang were independent sultanates until the British started asserting influence over them in the late 1800s.

In 1785, the British obtained the island of Penang from the Sultan of Kedah. The channel between the island and the mainland of peninsular Malaysia became the border between British territory and Kedah.

On 6 May 1869, the United Kingdom and Siam signed an agreement known as the Bangkok Treaty of 1869 where Siam ceded a piece of territory on the mainland opposite Penang to the United Kingdom. The territory became known as Province Wellesley (known as Seberang Perai today). The treaty also defined the border between British and Siamese territory and this border remains the boundary line between Penang and Kedah today, although both are now constituent states of Malaysia.

On 9 July 1909, the United Kingdom and Siam signed another agreement in Bangkok. Known as the Anglo-Siamese Treaty of 1909, the agreement stated the states of Kedah, Kelantan, and Terengganu belong to the United Kingdom while Pattani fell into Siamese hands. The treaty, in one of its four annexes, defined the border between British and Siamese territories. This border ultimately became today's border between Malaysia and Thailand.

Thailand regained influences of the Kedah, Kelantan, and Terengganu during World War II when the Japanese handed them over to the kingdom, thus moving the Malay States-Siamese border southwards again. The states were returned to the British at the end of the war.

== Disputes ==
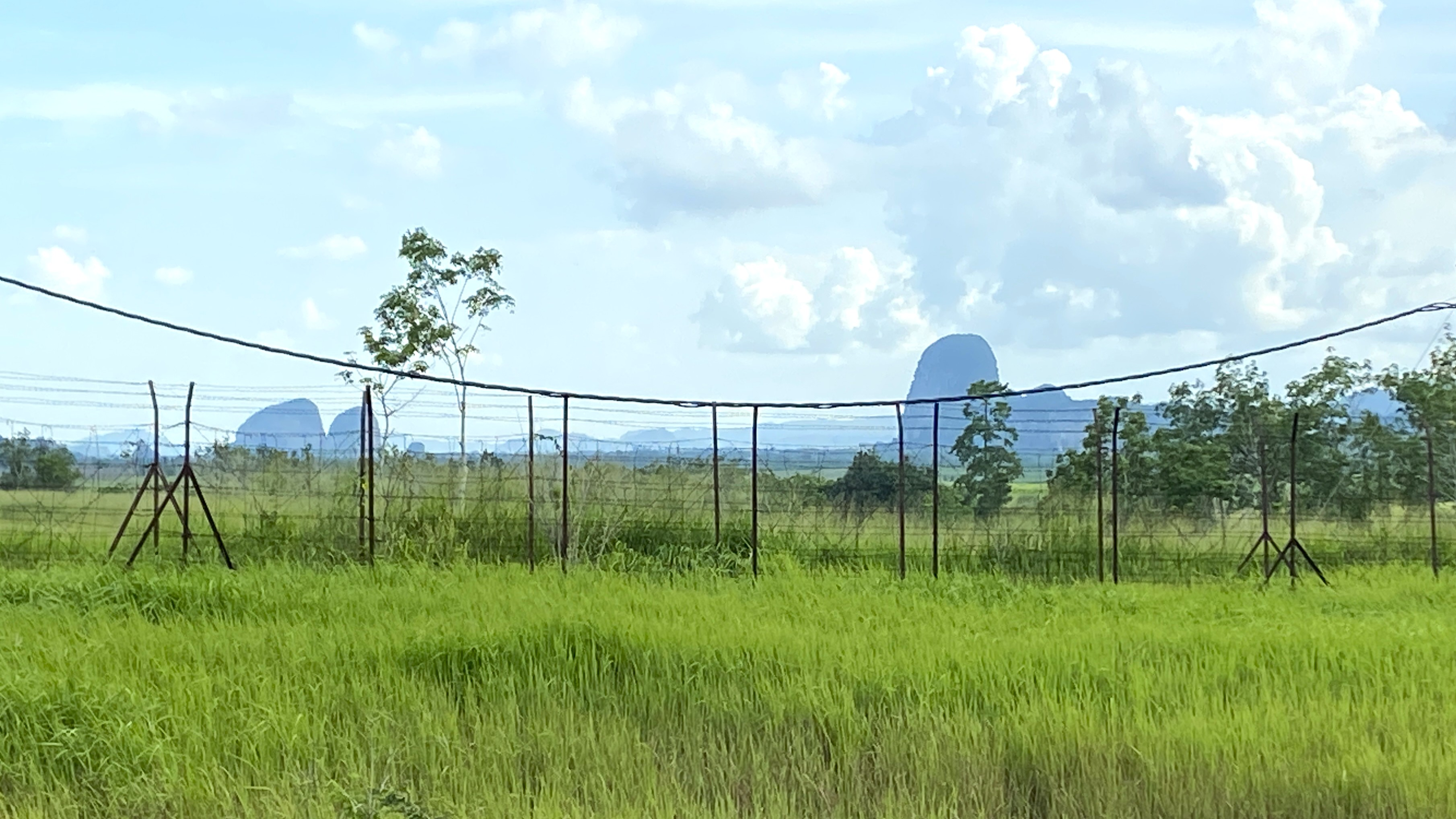
A double fence runs parallel to the Malaysia-Thailand border outside urban areas. Photo taken from Sadao District, Songkhla, Thailand, looking into Perlis, Malaysia.

There are two stretches of the Malaysia–Thailand border which is subject to dispute. The first involves the land border in the Bukit Jeli (Jeli Hill) at the headwaters of the Golok River and the second involves the continental shelf boundary in the Gulf of Thailand. Neither dispute has resulted in aggression between the two countries.

=== Bukit Jeli ===
The alignment of an 8.5 km stretch of the land border in the area known as Bukit Jeli (Jeli Hill) near the headwaters of the Golok River is currently being disputed by both countries. The resulting disputed territory has an area of 42 hectares. Negotiations to resolve the dispute through the joint subcommittee on co-operation along the border is on-going. The dispute arose in the 1990s when demarcation work for the land border almost reached completion. Malaysia's former Foreign Minister Syed Hamid Albar was quoted as saying that the failure was because of the inability to reach a consensus over a formula to solve the dispute. He said problems arose because the geographical features as described in border protocol of the 1909 Anglo-Siamese Treaty had changed.

=== Gulf of Thailand ===
The dispute over the continental shelf boundary between Malaysia and Thailand arises from the different baselines for Thailand which the two countries adopt in calculating the equidistant line for boundary. Thailand's proclaimed baseline runs from the terminus at Kuala Tabar (the eastern terminus of the Malaysia-Thailand land border as defined by the 1909 Anglo-Siamese Treaty) northwards to Ko Losin islet and then northwestwards to Ko Kra. Malaysia however does not regard Ko Losin as valid baseline point and calculates the equidistant line on a baseline running along the shore.

While both countries have agreed on 24 October 1979 on their maritime boundary for this area running 29 nautical miles (54 km) out to sea, the boundary beyond the northeastern terminus of the territorial sea is subject to dispute. Malaysia's continental shelf boundary extends from the terminus at co-ordinate 07° 49' N, 103° 02' 30" E which corresponds to Point 43 in a 1979 map published by Malaysia denoting its territorial sea and continental shelf. Thailand claims its continental shelf boundary extends from the terminus to co-ordinate 07° 22'.0 N, 103° 42' 30" E. A small slice of the disputed area is also subjected to a claim by Vietnam.

As a temporary solution to the dispute, Malaysia and Thailand on 21 February 1979 signed a memorandum of understanding to create a 7,250 km square joint development area encompassing the entire disputed area. This was later followed by an agreement on 30 May 1990. The agreement allows for joint exploitation and benefit of natural resources in the joint development area. In 1999, Malaysia, Thailand and Vietnam reached an agreement based on the principle of joint development for the area where the three countries have overlapping claims. All the agreements specifically state that they do not compromise each country's sovereignty claim over the disputed area.

== Joint development area ==
The Malaysia–Thailand Joint Development Area is a 7,250 km square area in the Gulf of Thailand which was created as an interim measure to deal with the overlapping claims of the continental shelf between the two countries. The formula allows for both countries to share the non-living natural resources from the area on a 50:50 basis. It however does not extinguish the sovereignty claims by both countries over the area.

Point	Latitude (N)	Longitude (E)	Remarks
Joint Development Area boundary turning points
A	6° 50'.0	102° 21'.2	Northern terminus of agreed continental shelf border; Point 45 on Malaysia's 1979 map; Point 4 of Thailand's EEZ border
B	7° 10'.25	102° 29'.0	Same as Point 44 on Malaysia's 1979 map
C	7° 49'.0	103° 02'.5	Same as Point 43 on Malaysia's 1979 map; Point C (eastern terminus) of the agreed Thailand-Vietnam continental shelf boundary.
D	7° 22'.0	103° 42'.5	Same as Point 8 of Thailand's EEZ border; located on Malaysia's continental shelf boundary between Point 43 and Point 42 in the 1979 map.
E	7° 20'.0	103° 39'.0	Same as Point 7 of Thailand's EEZ border
F	7° 03'.0	103° 39'.0	Same as Point 6 of Thailand's EEZ border
G	6° 53'.0	102° 34'.0	Same as Point 5 of Thailand's EEZ border
Coordinates of area within the joint development area claimed by Malaysia, Thailand and Vietnam
1	7° 48'.0	103° 02'.5	Same as Point C of the Malaysia-Thailand JDA boundary; Point 43 on Malaysia's 1979 map; and Point C (eastern terminus) of the agreed Thailand-Vietnam continental shelf boundary.
2	7° 22'.0	103° 42'.5	Same as Point D of the Malaysia-Thailand JDA
3	7° 20'.0	103° 39'.0	Same as Point E of the Malaysia-Thailand JDA; same as Point B of the Malaysia-Vietnam joint development defined area boundary.
4	7° 18'.31	103° 35'.71	Located along the south-eastern border of the Malaysia-Thailand JDA between Point E and Point F; same as Point C of the Malaysia-Vietnam joint development defined area boundary. The boundary then continues back to Point 1.

Malaysia's continental shelf limit claim is from Point A to Point C via Point B and thence to Point G while Thailand's Exclusive Economic Zone claim limit is from Point A to Point G through Points D, E, and F. It has not delimited its continental shelf limits beyond Point G.

== Border crossings ==
There are a total of 9 border crossings between Thailand and Malaysia. All border crossings are permanent border crossings.

No	Asian Highway	Malaysia		Thailand		Opening hours (Thailand Time)	Notes	Geographical coordinates
No	Road	Road	Border post	Road	Border post	Opening hours (Thailand Time)	Notes	Geographical coordinates
1		FT 226 Jalan Wang Kelian	Wang Kelian, Perlis	4184	Wang Prachan, Khuan Don, Satun	0700 - 1800		6.696676°N 100.178753°E
2		FT 7 Federal Route 7	Padang Besar, Perlis	4054	Padang Besar, Sadao, Songkhla	0500 - 2100	Road and Railway Checkpoint. Rail: Both Malaysian and Thai ICQS facilities are located in Padang Besar railway station on the Malaysian side. Padang Besar (Thai) is the station on the Thai side which has no ICQS facilities.	6.664302°N 100.327331°E
3	AH2	FT 1 Federal Route 1	Bukit Kayu Hitam, Kedah	4	Sadao (Ban Dan Nok), Sadao District, Songkhla	0500 - 2300		6.519097°N 100.419145°E
4		Jln. Durian Burung	Kota Putra (Durian Burung), Kedah	408	Ban Prakop, Na Thawi District, Songkhla	0700 - 1700		6.470370°N 100.708327°E
5		FT 77 Federal Route 77	Bukit Berapit, Pengkalan Hulu, Perak	4106	Betong, Betong District, Yala	0500 - 2200		5.747638°N 101.028446°E
6		FT 480, (off Route 4)	Bukit Bunga, Kelantan	4057	Ban Buke Ta, Waeng District, Narathiwat	0500 - 1800	The border crossing is via the Bukit Bunga–Ban Buketa Bridge over the Kolok River.	5.839002°N 101.892465°E
7	AH18	FT 3 Federal Route 3	Rantau Panjang, Kelantan	4057	Su-ngai Kolok, Su-ngai Kolok District, Narathiwat	0500 - 2100	Road and Railway Checkpoint. Road: The border crossing is via the Rantau Panjang–Sungai Golok Bridge over the Kolok River. Rail: No cross border train services, train services within Thailand terminating at Su-ngai Kolok railway station. Rantau Panjang railway station is closed. Railway tracks crossing the border on a separate bridge are currently not used.	6.022571°N 101.974955°E
8		-	Pengkalan Kubor Ferry Terminal, Kelantan	-	Tak Bai Ferry Terminal, Tak Bai District, Narathiwat	0600-1800	Ferry Checkpoint. Cross border passenger ferry boats also operate from another jetty in Tak Bai.	Pengkalan Kubor: 6°13′59″N 102°05′27″E Tak Bai: 6°14′11″N 102°05′26″E
9		-	Kuala Perlis Ferry Terminal, Perlis	-	Satun Ferry Terminal (Tammalang Pier), Mueang Satun District, Satun	0500-1800	Ferry Checkpoint	Satun: 6°31′59″N 100°04′10″E Kuah: 6°18′21″N 99°51′02″E Telaga: 6°21′59″N 99°41′08″E
9		-	Kuah Jetty, Langkawi, Kedah	-	Satun Ferry Terminal (Tammalang Pier), Mueang Satun District, Satun	0500-1800	Ferry Checkpoint	Satun: 6°31′59″N 100°04′10″E Kuah: 6°18′21″N 99°51′02″E Telaga: 6°21′59″N 99°41′08″E
9		-	Telaga Harbour Marina, Langkawi, Kedah	-	Satun Ferry Terminal (Tammalang Pier), Mueang Satun District, Satun	0500-1800	Ferry Checkpoint	Satun: 6°31′59″N 100°04′10″E Kuah: 6°18′21″N 99°51′02″E Telaga: 6°21′59″N 99°41′08″E

=== Airline connections ===
- Kuala Lumpur - Don Muang Airport (DMK) Bangkok
- Kuala Lumpur - Suvarnabhumi Airport (BKK) Bangkok
- Kuala Lumpur - Chiang Mai
- Kuala Lumpur - Hat Yai
- Kuala Lumpur - Ko Samui
- Kuala Lumpur - Krabi
- Kuala Lumpur - Phuket
- Kuala Lumpur - Surat Thani
- Penang - Don Muang Airport (DMK) Bangkok
- Penang - Suvarnabhumi Airport (BKK) Bangkok
- Penang - Phuket
- Penang - Ko Samui
- Subang - Ko Samui
- Subang - Hua Hin
- Johor Bahru - Don Muang Airport (DMK) Bangkok
- Kota Kinabalu - Don Muang Airport (DMK) Bangkok

== See also ==
- Malaysia-Thailand relations
- Video clip of Malaysia-Thailand boundary stones between the Malaysian state of Perlis and Thai province of Satun (in Malay)
- Video clip of 3 types of Malaysia-Thailand boundary stones (in Malay)
