= Malaysia Federal Route 200 =

Road in Malaysia

Federal Route 200
- Jalan Bukit Bunga-Jenok-Bukit Nangka

Route information
- Length: 10.49 km (6.52 mi)

Major junctions
- North end: Bukit Bunga
- FT 4 AH140 Federal Route 4 FT 480 Jalan Kompleks CIQ Bukit Bunga
- South end: Nibong

Location
- Country: Malaysia
- Primary destinations: Jenok; Ban Buketa (Thailand)

Highway system
- Highways in Malaysia; Expressways; Federal; State

Federal Route 200, or Jalan Bukit Bunga-Jenok-Bukit Nangka, is a federal road in Kelantan, Malaysia. It is a main route to Ban Buketa, Thailand.

== Features ==
At most sections, the Federal Route 200 was built under the JKR R5 road standard, allowing maximum speed limit of up to 90 km/h.

== List of junctions and towns ==
Km	Exit	Junctions	To	Remarks
		Bukit Bunga	East; FT 4 AH140 Tanah Merah; FT 4 AH140 Machang; FT 8 Kota Bharu; FT 3 AH18 Kuala Terengganu South; FT 4 AH140 Gerik; FT 4 AH140 Jeli	T-junctions
		Bukit Bunga Police Station		
		Sekolah Menengah Kebangsaan Bukit Bunga		
		Bukit Bunga Checkpoint	FT 480 Jalan Kompleks CIQ Bukit Bunga North; Bukit Bunga Checkpoint; Bukit Bunga-Ban Buketa Bridge; 4057 บูเก๊ะตา Ban Buketa South; FT 4 AH140 Gerik; FT 4 AH140 Jeli	Junctions
		Anti Smuggling Unit (UPP) Base		
		Jenok		
		Bukit Nangka	East; FT 4 AH140 Tanah Merah; FT 4 AH140 Machang; FT 8 Kota Bharu; FT 3 AH18 Kuala Terengganu South; FT 4 AH140 Gerik; FT 4 AH140 Jeli	T-junctions
