= Princess Sirindhorn Wildlife Sanctuary =

Wildlife sanctuary in Thailand

Coordinates: 06°04′33.8″N 101°57′49.3″E

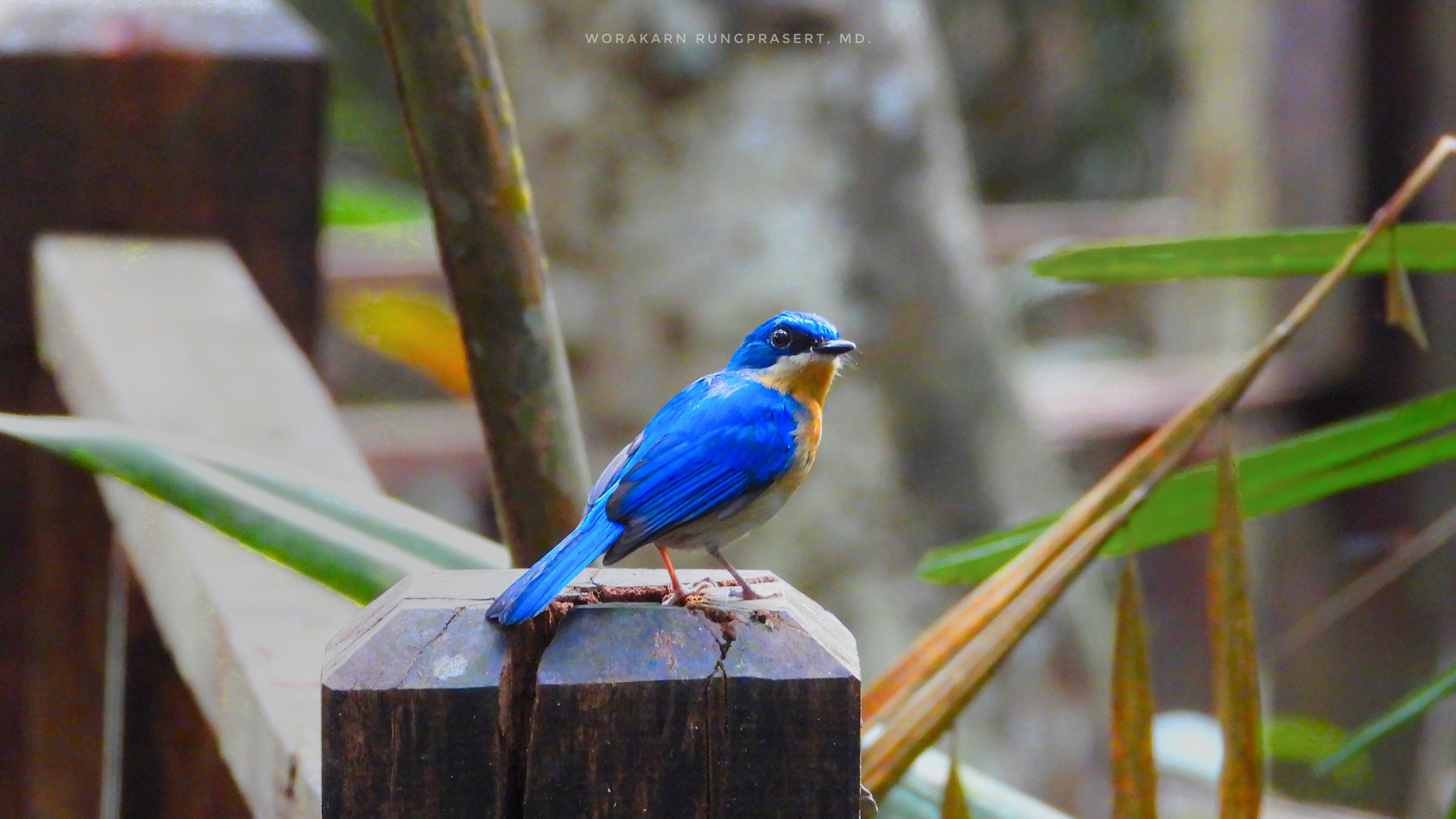
- Indochinese blue flycatcher at the sanctuary, 2025
- Location: Thailand
- Area: 4.96 km^{2} (1.92 sq mi)

Ramsar Wetland
- Official name: Princess Sirindhorn Wildlife Sanctuary
- Designated: 5 July 2001
- Reference no.: 1102

Princess Sirindhorn Wildlife Sanctuary (Thai: เขตรักษาพันธุ์สัตว์ป่าเฉลิมพระเกียรติสมเด็จพระเทพรัตนราชสุดาฯ สยามบรมราชกุมารี), or popularly known as Pa Phru To Daeng (ป่าพรุโต๊ะแดง), or just called Phru To Daeng (พรุโต๊ะแดง) is a largest and most fertile peat swamp forest in Thailand covering an area of 125,625 rais, about 4.9654 km^{2} (49,654 a) in Mueang Narathiwat, Tak Bai, Su-ngai Kolok, and Su-ngai Padi districts of Narathiwat province in southern Thailand. It is about 6 km (4 mi) from Su-ngai Kolok railway station.

It is named after Khlong To Daeng, one of three main watercourses flowing through the forest. "To Daeng" is a name of one old magician Muslim woman in folklore, who disappeared in the forest and was said to have finally transformed into a crocodile.

While its officially name honours Princess Maha Chakri Sirindhorn, who first visited here in 1990.

This peat swamp forest is a waterlogged tropical rainforest. Under the dark brown water is soft soil formed by the accumulation of decayed vegetation and animals that slowly decomposed and became peat soil with its layer's thickness of 0.5–5 m (2–16 ft). Since the soiled water is slightly acidic, the plants and wildlife species inhabiting the peat swamp forest and adaptable to the type of soil and basin that has expanded over the land for a long time. Pa Phru To Daeng contains a variety of flora and fauna with special characteristics. The plants growing in this forest have buttresses to support the trunks to stand on spongy ground as well as strong branch roots expanding with stilt roots intertwining to support each other. Interesting plant species in this forest include Egyptian white water-lily (Nymphaea lotus) and Kong (Hanguana malayana), a herbaceous plant with stolon that float in the water.

Pa Phru To Daeng provides habitat to flat-headed cat (Prionailurus planiceps), hairy-nosed otter (Lutra sumatrana), rufous-tailed shama (Trichixos pyrropygus), Malaysian blue flycatcher (Cyornis turcosus), especially black hornbill (Anthracoceros malayanus), one of 13 hornbill species in Thailand.

Fish species include Pseudeutropius indigens, which is the world's newest species of schilbeid catfish, slender walking catfish (Clarias nieuhofii), and rusty squarehead catfish (Chaca bankanensis), a small-sized catfish that looks like a flat-headed catfish, which is popular as ornamental fish.

In early 2026, a false gharial (Tomistoma schlegelii) was discovered here, despite being previously believed to have become extinct in the wild in Thailand.

Natural trails at the Sirindhorn Peat Swamp Forest Nature Research and Study Centre are about 950 m (3,100 ft) long with wooden bridges. Signboards along the trails inform visitors.
