= Malaysia Federal Route 480 =

Road in Malaysia

Federal Route 480
- Jalan Kompleks CIQ Bukit Bunga

Route information
- Maintained by Malaysian Public Works Department
- Length: 1.76 km (1.09 mi)

Major junctions
- East end: Bukit Nangka
- FT 4 AH140 Jalan Pasir Puteh–Machang–Jeli; FT 200 Federal Route 200
- West end: Bukit Bunga Checkpoint

Location
- Country: Malaysia
- Primary destinations: Bukit Bunga; Ban Buketa (Thailand)

Highway system
- Highways in Malaysia; Expressways; Federal; State

Jalan Kompleks CIQ Bukit Bunga, Federal Route 480 is an institutional facilities federal road in Kelantan, Malaysia. It is a main route to Bukit Bunga Checkpoint and Ban Buketa, Thailand.

At most sections, the Federal Route 480 was built under the JKR R5 road standard, allowing maximum speed limit of up to 90 km/h.

== List of junctions and towns ==
| Km | Exit | Junctions | To | Remarks |
|---|---|---|---|---|
| | | Bukit Nangka | East; FT 4 AH140 Tanah Merah; FT 4 AH140 Machang; FT 8 Kota Bharu; FT 3 AH18 Kuala Terengganu South; FT 4 AH140 Gerik; FT 4 AH140 Jeli | T-junctions |
| | | Bukit Bunga | Northwest; FT 200 Nangka; Anti Smuggling Unit (UPP) Base South; FT 200 Bukit Bunga; FT 4 AH140 Tanah Merah; FT 8 Kota Bharu | T-junctions |
| | | Bukit Bunga Checkpoint | | |
Anti-Smuggling Unit (UPP) checkpoint
Bukit Bunga Checkpoint
| | | Bukit Bunga Checkpoint | | |
| | | Bukit Bunga-Ban Buketa Bridge; Kolok River | | Start/End of bridge |
Malaysia; Kelantan Darul Naim; Tanah Merah district border (Time Zone: UTC+08:00 (Malaysia Standard Time))
ASEAN Malaysia-Thailand Border; Bukit Bunga-Ban Buketa Bridge; Kolok River
ประเทศไทย; Thailand จังหวัดนราธิวาส; Narathiwat Province ชายแดนอำเภอแว้ง; Waeng district border (Time Zone: UTC+07:00 (Thailand Standard Time))
| | | Bukit Bunga-Ban Buketa Bridge; Kolok River | | Start/End of bridge |
ด่านพรมแดนบูเก็ะตา; Ban Buketa Checkpoint
| | | | ' (Thailand) ประเทศไทย Thailand North; Route 4057 บูเก๊ะตา Ban Buketa; Route 4057 แว้ง Waeng; Route 4057 สุไหงโก-ลก Su-ngai Kolok; Route 4057 เมืองนราธิวาส Mueang Narathiwat Southwest; Route 4062 สุคิริน Sukhirin; Route 4062 จะแนะ Chanae; Route 4062 ระแงะ Ra-ngae | Y-junction |
