= Golok River =

River between Malaysia and Thailand

Golok River Maenam Kolok
- Etymology: 'River of machete'
- Native name: แม่น้ำโก-ลก (Thai)

Location
- Country: Malaysia/Thailand
- State/Province: Kelantan/Narathiwat

Physical characteristics
- Source
  - location: Sankalakhiri Mountains
- Mouth
  - coordinates: 6°14′40″N 102°05′26″E
- Length: 103 km (64 mi)
- Discharge
  - location: Gulf of Thailand

Basin features
- Bridges: Bukit Bunga-Ban Buketa Bridge; Rantau Panjang-Sungai Golok Bridge

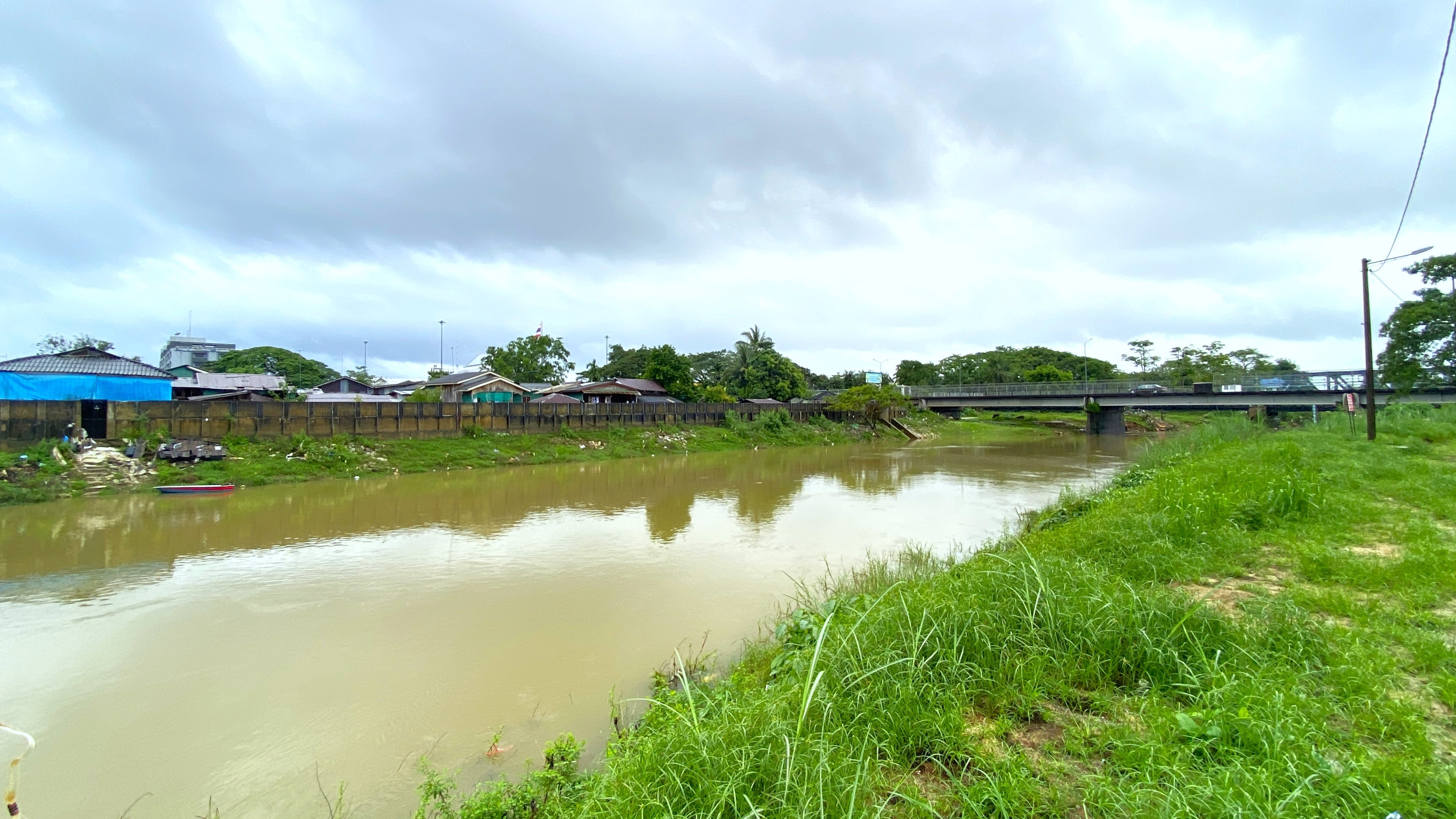
Golok River

The Golok River (Thai: แม่น้ำโก-ลก, RTGS: Maenam Kolok, pronounced [mɛ̂ː.náːm koː.lók]; Malay: Sungai Golok) is a river that lies on the border between Malaysia and Thailand. The name of the river in Malay means 'river of machete'.

The river borders the Malaysian state of Kelantan and the Thai province of Narathiwat. The friendship bridge connects the Malaysian town of Rantau Panjang and the Thai town of Su-ngai Kolok. Rantau Panjang is a duty-free zone. Further upstream, a new friendship bridge connects the town of Bukit Bunga on the Malaysian side with the Thai town of Ban Buketa.

== Course ==
The Golok River originates in the Sankalakhiri Mountains in Thailand's Sukhirin District, flowing northeast through Waeng, Su-ngai Kolok and Tak Bai Districts. It is 103 kilometres (64 mi) long. The area the river flows through, especially Sukhirin, used to be a prosperous gold mine since pre-Second World War period. Although today it is not as busy as before, but the gold panning career still continues for Sukhirin residents. The villagers use their gold dredging skills as an additional source of income such as promoting local tourism. The river empties into the Gulf of Thailand at Tak Bai District, Narathiwat Province and Pengkalan Kubor, Kelantan.

== Flood risks ==
The Golok floods seasonally with the monsoon. An unusually large flood occurred on 21 December 2009, causing an evacuation of parts of Kelantan.

== See also ==
- Malaysia–Thailand relations
