= Rantau Panjang–Sungai Golok Bridge =

Rantau Panjang–Sungai Golok Bridge Jambatan Rantau Panjang–Sungai Golok สะพานโก–ลก
- Coordinates: 6°01′22″N 101°58′30″E
- Carries: Motor vehicles
- Crosses: Kolok River, Malaysia-Thailand Border
- Locale: Rantau Panjang, Kelantan
- Official name: Rantau Panjang–Sungai Golok Bridge

Characteristics
- Design: Box girder bridge
- Total length: 109.73 m (360 ft)
- Width: 11.58 m (38 ft)
- Longest span: 30.48 m (100 ft), each of 3 spans

History
- Constructed by: Chang Loon Construction Co., Ltd and Jabatan Kerja Raya (JKR)
- Opened: 21 May 1973

Location
- Interactive map of Rantau Panjang–Sungai Golok Bridge

Rantau Panjang–Sungai Golok Bridge (Malay: Jambatan Rantau Panjang–Sungai Golok, Thai: สะพานโก–ลก), popularly called the "Harmony Bridge" (Malay: Jambatan Muhibah), is a road bridge crossing Kolok River (Malay: Sungai Golok) of the Malaysia–Thailand border, connecting Rantau Panjang town in Kelantan, Malaysia, with Su-ngai Kolok town in Narathiwat, Narathiwat Province, Thailand. It spans to the south of the cross-border railway bridge Harmony-Bridge nearby. The bridge is a part of Asian highway network AH18, including Thailand Route 4056 and Federal Route 3. It was built by the governments of both countries, and was officially opened on 21 May 1973 by both Malaysian Prime Minister Tun Abdul Razak bin Haji Dato' Hussein Al-Haj and Thai Prime Minister Field Marshal Thanom Kittikachorn.

== Design ==
The bridge is a beam bridge with box girders. The main part includes three spans, using prestressed concrete, with each length of 30.48 metres (100 ft). Each end is connected to a ferroconcrete span, with length of 9.14 m (30 ft). It is overall 109.73 m (360 ft) long, with 7.32 m (24 ft) wide road surface and 2.13 m (7 ft) wide walkway each side.

== Construction ==
Construction was done by Chang Loon Construction Co., Ltd., a Malaysian contractor which won the bidding-held meanwhile in both countries on 25 September 1970. The ask price was M$630,000 or 4,500,000 baht. A contract was signed on 16 December 1970. Both governments paid half each. Since the construction was finished on 20 March 1973, after the deadline of 15 June 1972, the company had to pay overtime penalty M$200 or 1,400 baht a day, totalling M$36,000 or 252,000 baht.

== See also ==
- Bukit Bunga–Ban Buketa Bridge
- List of international bridges
