= Tak Bai =

Tak Bai ตากใบ
- Town
- Location in Thailand
- Coordinates: 6°15′33″N 102°3′11″E
- Country: Thailand
- Province: Narathiwat
- District: Tak Bai

Population (2021)
  - Total: 74,186

Tak Bai (Thai: ตากใบ; pronounced [tàːk bāj] Malay: Tabal) is the capital of Tak Bai District, Narathiwat Province, Thailand. It is situated on the western bank of the Golok River estuary, which is the natural international boundary between Thailand and Malaysia. Visitors can enter Malaysia via Pengkalan Kubor, Kelantan with a ferry service.

Administratively it is a town (thesaban mueang), and covers 9.14 km^{2} of the subdistrict (tambon) Che He. As of 2007 it has a population of 17,317.

== Notable incidents ==
It is the location of the Tak Bai Incident of 25 October 2004 in which at least 85 demonstrators died.

== History ==
During the 19th century it was known as Tabal, part of the state of Kelantan, then an autonomous tributary state of Siam. Under the 1909 Anglo-Siamese Treaty the Golok River was made the new border and thus Tabal was reassigned to Narathiwat Province. The town was created as a sanitary district (sukhaphiban) in 1956. Like all sanitary districts, it was upgraded to a subdistrict municipality (thesaban tambon) in May 1999. On 31 January 2008 it was upgraded to a town (thesaban mueang).
