= Death of Phamon Phonphanit =

Car bombing of journalist in Thailand

Sungai Kolok Bombings
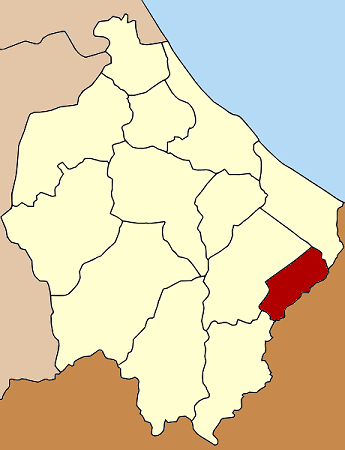
- Map of Narathiwat province, Thailand, highlighting Amphoe Sungai Kolok
- Location: Sungai Kolok district, Narathiwat province, Thailand
- Date: 16 September 2011
- Target: Tourism sites
- Attack type: Car bombing
- Deaths: 6
- Injuries: 118
- Victim: Phamon Phonphanit

The death of Phamon Phonphanit (also referred to as "Phamon Phaophanit" and "Phakon Pheungnet") is about the journalist who died during a bombing on September 16, 2011. Phonphanit was a journalist in Narathiwat province, Thailand and he died while covering the bombing in Sungai Kolok. Six people died as a result of the incident, and about 100 were injured. The incident caused a public and media discussion about the South Thailand insurgency as a result of criticism over the government's initial reaction, especially the contradictictory information delivered by the military, who called it a drug war retaliation, and the police, who said it was conducted by insurgents.

== Phonphanit ==
Phamon Phonphanit was born in 1950 and died on September 24, 2011. He was a print reporter for Sue Samut Atyakam, a local Thai newspaper in the Narathiwat province, and the ISRA News Agency. He died later from injuries sustained while covering a bombing on September 16, 2011. He is now buried at Wat Khok Khien.

== Incident ==
On 16 September 2011, Phonphanit was reporting about a series of bombings that were occurring in downtown Sungai Kolok. While he was at the scene reporting about two car bombs that had just exploded minutes earlier, a motorcycle bomb went off injuring him among several civilians. Phonphanit died at Yala Central Hospital eight days later where he was sent for severe burns.

The bombs in the cars and motorcycle were detonated in specific 20-minute intervals along the busy strip where they were strategically placed. A fourth bomb was discovered and defused before it was able to explode. The three bombs caused around 118 injuries and six deaths in the heavily populated area. Four people died at the scene and two more people died later. Phonphanit was the sixth death. Four Malaysians died and two Thai citizens.

Thai soldiers interrogated two suspects seen on videotapes and placed by eyewitnesses.

== Context ==
Authorities believe the bombs are related to the violent conflict between various Muslim insurgent movements that started in January 2004. The South Thailand insurgency is a movement that is still active in southern Thailand today. Muslims have a majority in the south. More than 4,800 people have been killed in southern Thailand as a result of attacks. Thailand government officials have yet to resolve these issues. The suspects denied involvement and were later released. No one has been officially charged for the attack nor has any group claimed responsibility. An almost identical bombing in the same city happened on 21 August 2008, killing another Thai reporter, Chalee Boonsawat of the Thai Rath.

== Impact ==
In March 2011, the government stated that the violence is in fact still increasing.

Initially a military spokesperson said the incident was the work of a "drug gang". But the bombings actually raised the awareness and led to discussions in the press about the insurgent uprising in the south by Muslim separatists, according to an editorial in the Asia Times. For example, Thai Travel News wrote that the military had "confused" people by calling it a drug war retaliation and clarified the attack as part of the insurgency. It quoted a border police official as saying the attack was aimed at grabbing international attention.

== Reactions ==
Jacqueline Park, who is the director of IFJ Asia-Pacific, said, "Phamon's death should serve as a reminder to media owners to ensure that adequate safety measures are provided to all media personnel working in dangerous locations."

== See also ==
- List of terrorist incidents in 2011
- South Thailand insurgency
