= Rantau Panjang =

Town in Malaysia

Coordinates: 6.02254°N 101.96918°E

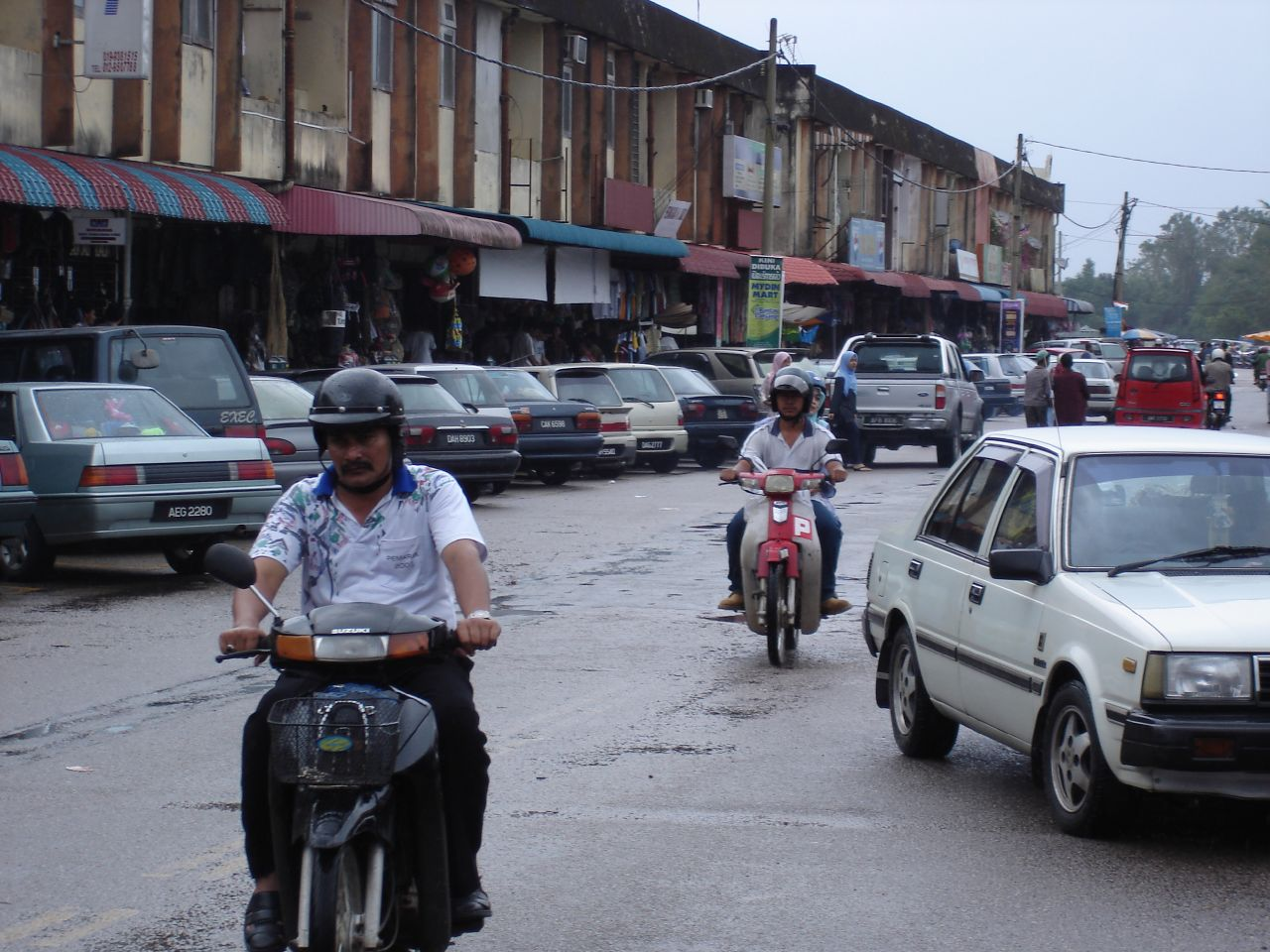
Rantau Panjang townscape

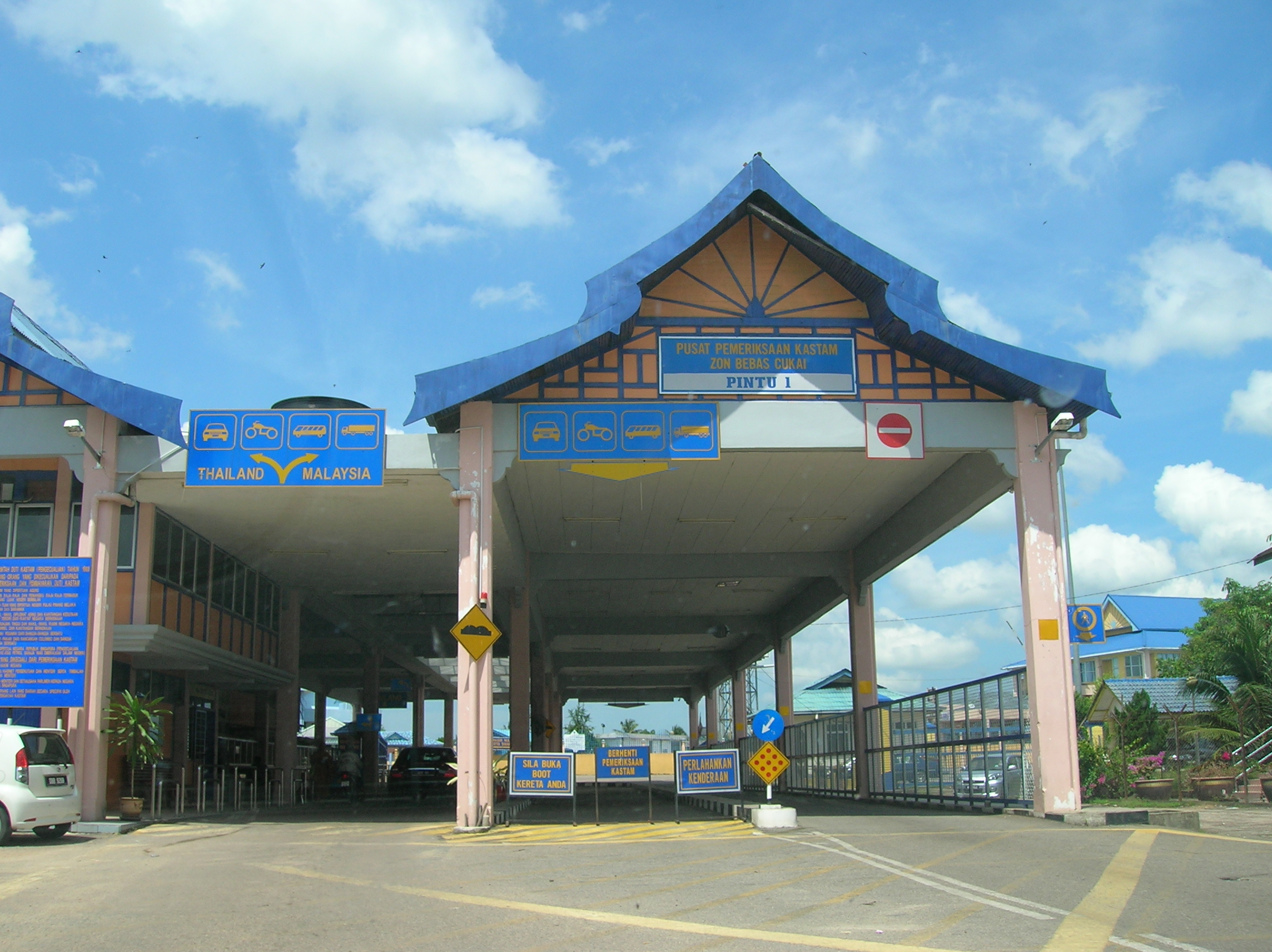
Rantau Panjang Immigration, Customs, Quarantine, and Security (ICQS) Complex

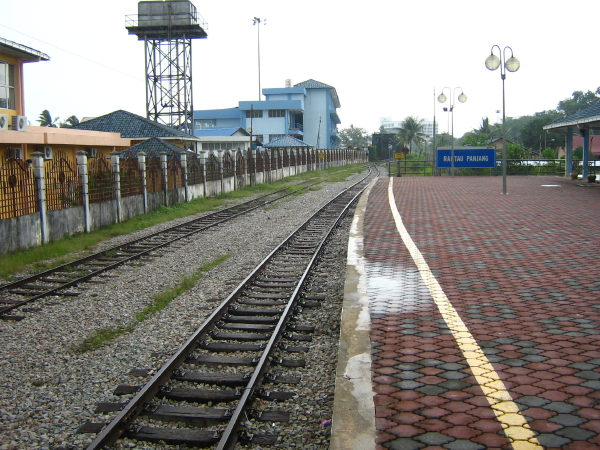
Disused Rantau Panjang railway station

Rantau Panjang (Kelantanese: Ghata Panjey; Jawi: رنتاو ڤنجڠ) is a mukim (subdistrict/commune) and also a parliamentary constituency in Pasir Mas District, Kelantan, Malaysia, located next to the Thai border.

The town of Su-ngai Kolok is situated adjacent to Rantau Panjang on the Thai side of the border, right across the Golok River. Both towns are linked via the Rantau Panjang-Sungai Golok Bridge, popularly known as the Harmony Bridge (Malay: Jambatan Muhibbah).

Along with Pengkalan Kubor on the South China Sea coast, Rantau Panjang is a popular place for duty-free shopping. In that respect, Rantau Panjang depends heavily on domestic and Thai tourists.
