= Phukhao Thong, Narathiwat =

Phukhao Thong ภูเขาทอง
- Tambon
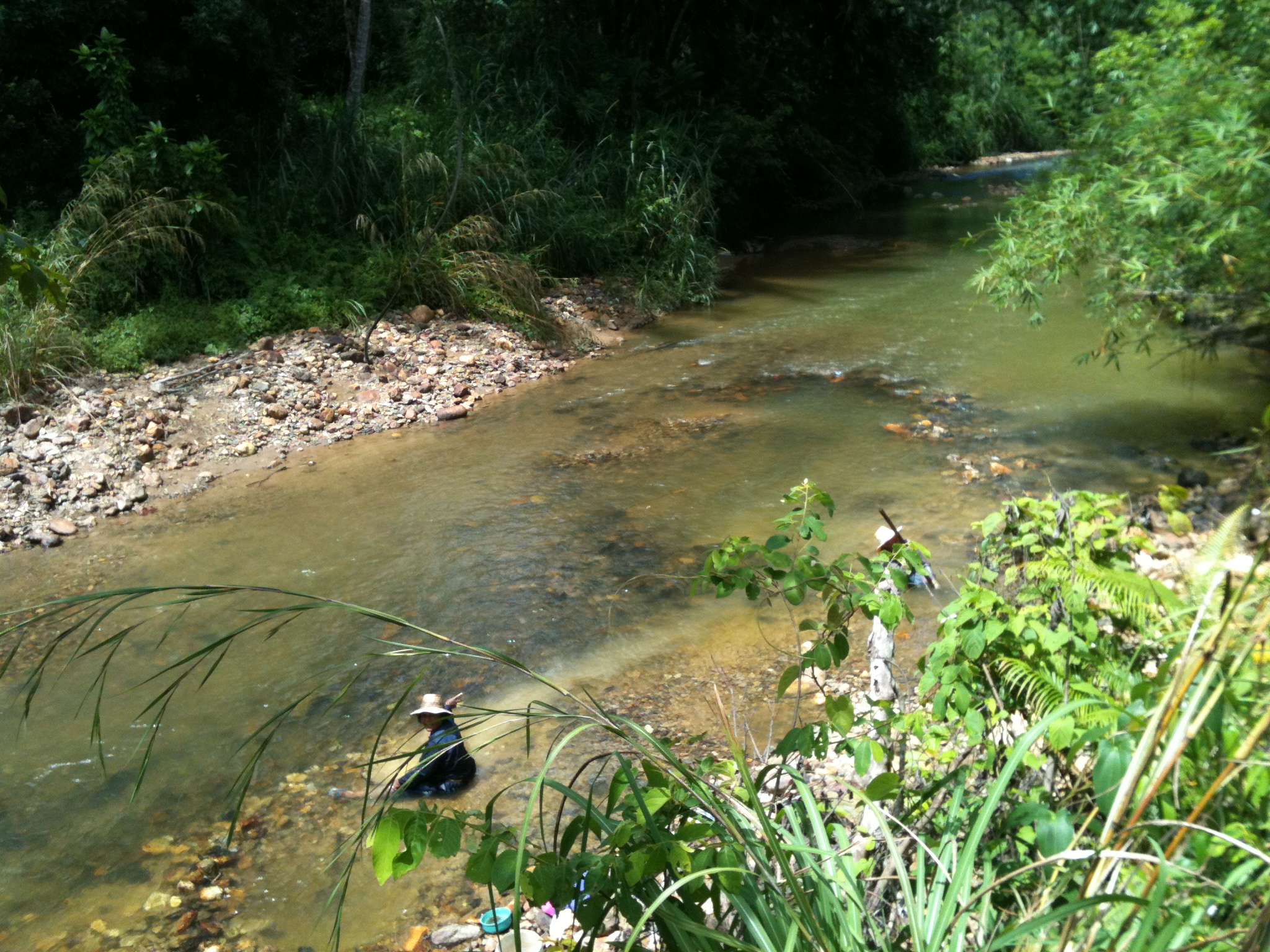
- Panning for gold at the stream, Phukhao Thong
- Etymology: Golden Mount
- Mottoes: "ต้นน้ำสายบุรี มากมีผลไม้ หลากหลายวัฒนธรรม แร่ทองคำล้ำค่า ฮาลา-บาลา ป่านกเงือก" ("Origin of Sai Buri river. Lots of fruit. Multicultural. Precious gold ore. Hala-Bala. Forest of Hornbills.")
- Interactive map of Phukhao Thong
- Coordinates: 5°49′33.34″N 101°43′21.44″E
- Country: Thailand
- Province: Narathiwat
- District: Sukhirin
- Named for: Local gold mines

Government
  - Type: Subdistrict Administrative Organization (SAO)
  - Mayor: Manus Tangjai
- Time zone: UTC+7 (ICT)
- Postcode: 96190
- Area code: (+66) 02

Phukhao Thong (Thai: ภูเขาทอง, pronounced [pʰūː.kʰǎw tʰɔ̄ːŋ]) is a tambon (subdistrict) in Sukhirin district, Narathiwat province in lower southern Thailand.

== Geography ==
Phukhao Thong (lit. golden mount) is an area surrounded by the lush Bala-Hala forest. This forestland is the most complete forest in the lower southern region, there is a border extending to the Belum forest in Malaysia, part of Peninsular Malaysian rain forests.

== History ==
Its history dates back to the reign of King Mongkut (Rama IV), when Hiw Sin Jiw, a Hokkien Chinese immigrated to live and engaged in gold panning. At that time, gold from the gold mines of Phu Khao Thong was sent as tribute by the governor of Patani to the Siamese king in Bangkok for 30 catty per year. Until the reign of King Chulalongkorn (Rama V), he was appointed to tax collector for gold panning business and received the title of Khun Phra Wiset Suwannaphum (คุณพระวิเศษสุวรรณภูมิ).

Around 1975–1976, the government had a policy to allow Isan people to migrate to escape drought from their homeland, come settle down to live and earn a living here, by granting ownership rights to pioneer arable land. Until the present, the majority of Phu Khao Thong population are Isan people or were they descendants of the Isan people at that time who travel here by train.

== Environment ==
There is an abundance of plants and variety of wildlife. There are 13 species of hornbills found in Thailand up to 10 species can be found here.

Phu Khao Thong is also home to the largest Tetrameles nudiflora tree in Thailand.

== Economy ==
Most of the population's main occupation is rubber cultivation, followed by oil palm cultivation. Gold panning still exists for some and some of it is done to promote tourism.

== Administration ==
The entire area is under the administration of Subdistrict Administrative Organization Phu Khao Thong (SAO Phu Khao Thong), the local government was planted in 1997 by promoted from Subdistrict Council of Phu Khao Thong.

Phu Khao Thong is further divided into five muban (villages).

The seal of SAO Phu Khao Thong features hornbill and triangle in the green background. The hornbill represents abundance and the triangle symbolizes mountains.
