= Cho-airong district =

Cho-airong เจาะไอร้อง
- District
- District location in Narathiwat province
- Coordinates: 6°12′6″N 101°50′30″E
- Country: Thailand
- Province: Narathiwat
- Seat: Chuap
- Subdistricts: 3
- Mubans: 33
- District established: 1993

Area
  - Total: 162.7232 km^{2} (62.8278 sq mi)

Population (2014)
  - Total: 39,236
  - Density: 221.2/km^{2} (573/sq mi)
- Time zone: UTC+7 (ICT)
- Postal code: 96130
- Geocode: 9613

Cho-airong (Thai: เจาะไอร้อง, pronounced [t͡ɕɔ̀ʔ.ʔāj.rɔ́ːŋ]; Pattani Malay: แชย็อง, pronounced [tɕʰɛː.jɔŋ]) is a district (amphoe) of Narathiwat province, southern Thailand.

== History ==
Cho-airong was made a minor district (king amphoe) on 31 May 1993, by separating three tambons from Ra-ngae district. On 5 December 1996 it was upgraded to a full district.

== Geography ==
Neighboring districts are (from the north clockwise): Mueang Narathiwat, Tak Bai, Su-ngai Padi and Ra-ngae.

== Administration ==
=== Central administration ===
Cho-airong is divided into three sub-districts (tambons), which are further subdivided into 33 administrative villages (mubans).

No.	Name	Thai	Villages	Pop.
1.	Chuap	จวบ	8	11,726
2.	Bukit	บูกิต	14	17,955
3.	Maruebo Ok	มะรือโบออก	11	9,555

=== Local administration ===
There are three sub-district administrative organizations (SAO) in the district:

- Chuap (Thai: องค์การบริหารส่วนตำบลจวบ) consisting of sub-district Chuap.
- Bukit (Thai: องค์การบริหารส่วนตำบลบูกิต) consisting of sub-district Bukit.
- Maruebo Ok (Thai: องค์การบริหารส่วนตำบลมะรือโบออก) consisting of sub-district Maruebo Ok.
