= Bukit Bunga–Ban Buketa Bridge =

Bukit Bunga–Ban Buketa Bridge Jambatan Persahabatan สะพานมิตรภาพ
- Coordinates: 5°50′20″N 101°53′33″E
- Carries: Motor vehicles
- Crosses: Kolok River, Malaysia-Thailand Border
- Locale: Bukit Bunga, Kelantan
- Official name: Friendship Bridge

Characteristics
- Design: Box girder bridge
- Total length: 120 m
- Width: 16.9 m

History
- Opened: 21 December 2007

Location
- Interactive map of Bukit Bunga–Ban Buketa Bridge

Bukit Bunga–Ban Buketa Bridge (Malay: Jambatan Bukit Bunga–Ban Buketa, Thai: สะพานบูเก๊ะตา) is a bridge crossing the Kolok River (Malay: Sungai Golok) at the Malaysia–Thailand border, connecting Bukit Bunga town in Kelantan with Buketa village in Waeng District, Narathiwat Province, Thailand. It is the newest border crossing between Malaysia and Thailand and the third bridge crossing the Kolok river. The bridge was one of the co-operative projects under the framework of the Indonesia-Malaysia-Thailand Growth Triangle (IMT-GT).

The project, costing RM9.2 million with each both governments paying half, was given to a Malaysian contractor. The groundbreaking for the bridge was held on 14 October 2004 by the prime ministers of both countries. Construction was delayed, especially on the Thai side, with escalations in the insurgency in nearby Thai provinces, and it took 11 months of work to be completed 3 years later. It was officially opened on 21 December 2007 by the Malaysian prime minister, Abdullah Ahmad Badawi, and the Thai prime minister, Surayud Chulanont.

== See also ==
- Rantau Panjang–Sungai Golok Bridge
- List of international bridges
