= Kolae boat =

A kolae or kolek boat (Thai: เรือกอและ, RTGS: ruea kolae, pronounced [rɯ̄a̯ kɔ̄ːlɛ́ʔ], Malay: Perahu Kolek) is a traditional fishing boat used in the lower southern provinces of Thailand and eastern coast of peninsular Malaysia.

It is a small coastal boat, between 10 and 12.5 metres (33 and 41 ft) long, the bow and the stern being higher than the hull. Designs on the boat are a combination of Malay, Javanese, and Thai styles, with emphasis on Thai patterns, such as a running scroll design, lotus, serpents, magic monkeys, and heads of birds in literature like "Burong Si-ngo" or Singhapaksi (a creature with the body of a lion and the head of a bird holding a fish with its beak) at the bow. The creature has sharp fangs and claws, is powerful and is a good diver. Therefore, it has been a favorite of kolae fishers since ancient times. The art on the boat is like an "artistic masterpiece on waves" and is considered art of life as the kolae boat not only shows off the greatness of its design, but is also the primary instrument used by fishermen to make a living. It is said that a Bang Nara villager without a kolae fishing boat is like a person without clothes.
