= Sukhirin district =

Sukhirin สุคิริน
- District
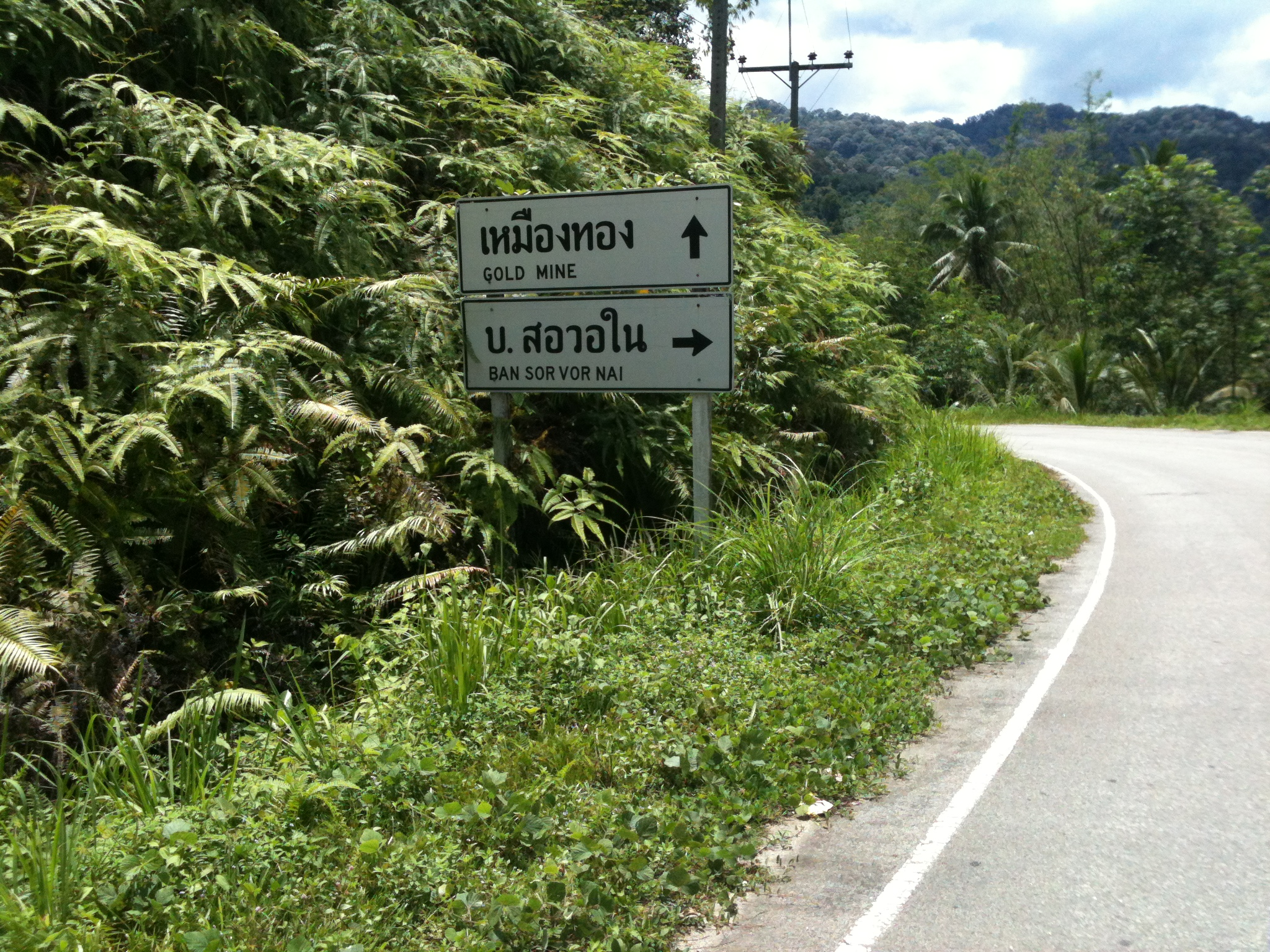
- Road signs in Sukhirin (September 2012)

- District location in Narathiwat province
- Coordinates: 5°56′20″N 101°46′14″E
- Country: Thailand
- Province: Narathiwat
- Seat: Sukhirin

Area
  - Total: 513.0 km^{2} (198.1 sq mi)

Population (2005)
  - Total: 22,194
  - Density: 43.3/km^{2} (112/sq mi)
- Time zone: UTC+7 (ICT)
- Postal code: 96190
- Geocode: 9609

Sukhirin (Thai: สุคิริน, pronounced [sù.kʰī.rīn] or [sū.kʰī.rīn]) is a district (amphoe) in the southern part of Narathiwat province, southern Thailand.

== History ==
Tambons Mamong and Sukhirin were separated from Waeng district to create the minor district (king amphoe) Sukhirin on 1 March 1977. The minor district was officially upgraded to a full district on 21 January 1986.

Originally, this district was called Pajo and was a status as a minor district that was established in 1931 and dissolved in 1941.

Its name "Sukhirin" means "beautiful lush greenery", granted by HRH Princess Srinagarindra in 1967, who had the palace here. Which was named after its spectacular topography with a variety of plant species, forest and mountains.

== Geography ==
Sukhirin is a district that embraced by mountains and curtains of fog all year. The abundant area encompasses natural resources, forest, mountain ranges and numerous attractions.

Neighboring districts are (from the northwest clockwise): Chanae, Ra-ngae, Su-ngai Padi, Waeng of Narathiwat Province and the states Perak and Kelantan of Malaysia.

== Demographics ==
In 1963, the Thai government launched the Nikhom Sang Ton Eng Pak Tai ('self-development community in the south') program to move families from Thailand's northeastern and central provinces to the Sukhirin and Chanae Districts of Narathiwat. A total of 5,633 families were relocated to Narathiwat, where each family was rewarded with 18 rai of land. In Phukhao Thong today, most inhabitants migrated from the northeast. They continue to speak Isan and are 90% Buddhist in an overwhelmingly Muslim province. As of 2019, Phukhao Thong residents retain remnants of Isan culture, such as organizing an annual Rocket Festival (Bun Bung Fai) festival and continuing to play traditional Isan musical instruments such as the khene and phin.

== Administration ==
The district is divided into five sub-districts (tambons), which are further subdivided into 41 villages (mubans). The township (thesaban tambon) Sukhirin covers parts of tambons Sukhirin, Mamong and Kia. There are a further five tambon administrative organizations (TAO).

No.	Name	Thai name	Villages	Pop.
1.	Mamong	มาโมง	10	5,618
2.	Sukhirin	สุคิริน	13	5,949
3.	Kia	เกียร์	5	3,803
4.	Phukhao Thong	ภูเขาทอง	8	2,445
5.	Rom Sai	ร่มไทร	5	4,379

== Economy ==
Phukhao Thong Subdistrict, bordering Malaysia's Kelantan state, has been a gold mining centre since 1932. Then, the French Societe des Mine d'Or de Litcho was awarded a 25-year concession to mine for gold in the area. The business was a casualty of World War II, when in 1941 the company was forced to close. During its nine years of mining in the subdistrict, the company extracted 1,951 kg of gold. The shaft of an old mine still exists. Locals still pan for gold in the Sai Buri River and have made gold panning a pillar of the local tourism initiative to draw tourists to the area.
