= Narathat Beach =

Beach in Thailand

Coordinates: 6°26′49.95″N 101°49′27.04″E

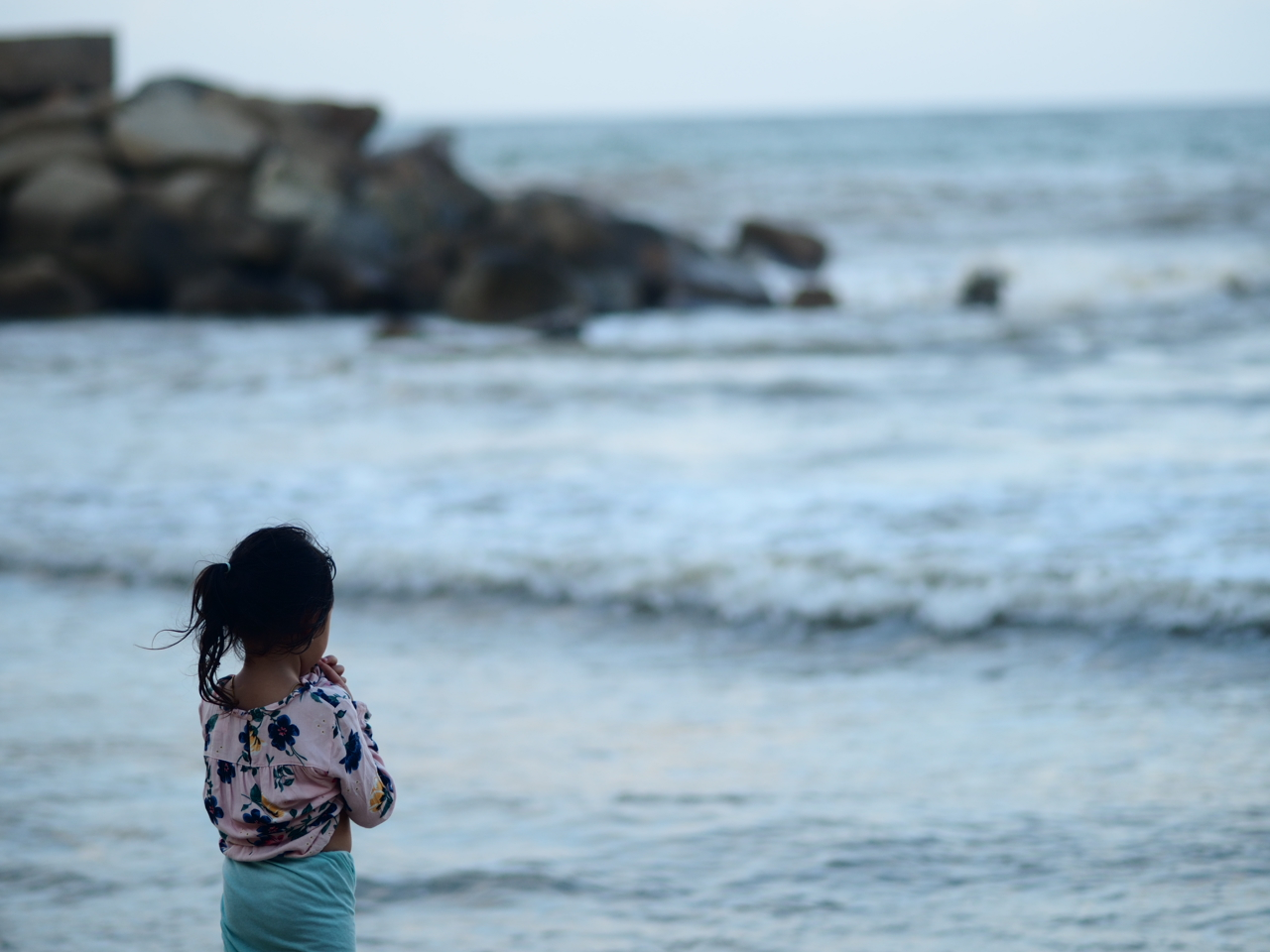
Narathat Beach

Narathat Beach (Thai: หาดนราทัศน์, RTGS: Hat Narathat, pronounced [hàːt nā.rāː.tʰát]) is a beach on the Gulf of Thailand about 5 kilometres (3 mi) long near Narathiwat, Thailand. Narathiwat is south of Pattani, midway between it and the border with Malaysia. It ends at a cape at the mouth of Bang Nara River where the annual kolae boat races are held. The beach is shaded by rows of pines. Nearby are fishing villages spread along the river and the bay is full of kolae boats of fishermen.

New Central Mosque is at Ban Bang Nara, just before Narathat Beach. This is a religious site for Thai Muslims. It was built in 1981 and is the province's second central mosque. The Arabian-style building has three floors. The ground floor is the main convention hall and the prayer rooms are on the top two floors. The top is covered with a large dome and there is a high tower for calling Muslims to prayer.
