= Tak Bai district =

Tak Bai ตากใบ تبل
- District
- District location in Narathiwat province
- Coordinates: 6°15′32″N 102°3′18″E
- Country: Thailand
- Province: Narathiwat
- Seat: Tak Bai
- District established: 1909

Area
  - Total: 253.45 km^{2} (97.86 sq mi)

Population (2009)
  - Total: 66,579
  - Density: 257.5/km^{2} (667/sq mi)
- Time zone: UTC+7 (ICT)
- Postal code: 96110
- Geocode: 9602

Tak Bai (Thai: ตากใบ, pronounced [tàːk bāj] Malay: Tabal) is a district (amphoe) in the southeastern part of Narathiwat province, southern Thailand.

== History ==
When the United Kingdom and Siam (Thailand) signed the Anglo-Siamese Treaty of 1909, they agreed to use the Kolok River (Sungai Golok) near Wat Chonthara Singhe (วัดชลธาราสิงเห) as the boundary between British Malaya and Siam due to the culture and arts inside the temple. Before, the area was part of the Mueang Kelantan.

The district was officially created on 12 August 1909.

On 25 October 2004 at least 85 demonstrators died after a brutal police action in the so-called Tak Bai Incident.

== Geography ==
Neighboring districts are (from the southwest clockwise): Su-ngai Kolok, Su-ngai Padi, Cho-airong, Mueang Narathiwat of Narathiwat Province, and the Gulf of Thailand. To the southeast is the Tumpat District in state Kelantan of Malaysia.

The boundary crossing is at Pengkalan Kubur (Malaysia) and Tak Bai (Thailand).

On 1 January falls on the New Year's Day, Tak Bai is the first place in Thailand that receives the sunshine, despite not being the easternmost area in the country. This is because the Earth's axis is tilted during the cold season. Which the sun will rise before Khong Chiam district in Ubon Ratchathani province the location of Pha Taem National Park, about one minute.

== Administration ==
The district is divided into eight sub-districts (tambons), which are further subdivided into 56 villages (mubans). Tak Bai itself has town (thesaban mueang) status and covers parts of tambon Che He. There are a further eight tambon administrative organizations (TAO).

No.	Name	Thai	Villages	Pop.
1.	Chehe	เจ๊ะเห	8	19,205
2.	Phrai Wan	ไพรวัน	10	8,712
3.	Phron	พร่อน	6	4,418
4.	Sala Mai	ศาลาใหม่	8	8,847
5.	Bang Khun Thong	บางขุนทอง	6	5,064
6.	Ko Sathon	เกาะสะท้อน	9	9,219
7.	Na Nak	นานาค	4	4,497
8.	Khosit	โฆษิต	5	6,617

== Tak Bai’s Salted Kulao Fish ==
Salted kulao fish is a salted fish from the Tak Bai District. It is considered a famous local product for more than 100 years. Pla kulao (Thai: ปลากุเลา; pronounced [plāːkù(ʔ).lāw]; fourfinger threadfin; Eleutheronema tetradactylum) is produced through a local process. Fresh fourfinger threadfin from the sea around the mouth of the Tak Bai River, which is abundant, has been used as a source of food for this type of threadfin from other sources until it became well-liked in the locality, in the provinces, and in neighbouring countries. It is a famous souvenir of the south and Narathiwat. Tak Bai folks have a long-held secret that has been passed down, which involves meticulousness in every step of the manufacturing process and the careful selection of raw materials. This produces well-known, high-quality products. Its meat is not too salty taste, fluffy texture, and a unique aroma of salted fish, and on the ground, it is dubbed as "King of Salted Fish".

Tak Bai's salted kulao fish was served as one of the dishes at the gala dinner for world leaders attending the APEC 2022 meeting hosted by Thailand.
