= Su-ngai Padi district =

Su-ngai Padi สุไหงปาดี
- District
- District location in Narathiwat province
- Coordinates: 6°5′7″N 101°52′49″E
- Country: Thailand
- Province: Narathiwat
- Seat: Paluru

Area
  - Total: 372.6 km^{2} (143.9 sq mi)

Population (2005)
  - Total: 54,095
  - Density: 145.2/km^{2} (376/sq mi)
- Time zone: UTC+7 (ICT)
- Postal code: 96140
- Geocode: 9611

Su-ngai Padi (Thai: สุไหงปาดี, pronounced [sū.ŋǎj pāː.dīː], Malay: Sungai Padi; Jawi: سوڠاي ڤادي) is a district (amphoe) in Narathiwat province, Thailand.

== Geography ==
Neighboring districts are (from the north clockwise): Cho-airong, Tak Bai, Su-ngai Kolok, Waeng, Sukhirin, and Ra-ngae.

== Administration ==
The district is divided into six sub-districts (tambons), which are further subdivided into 50 villages (mubans). Paluru is a township (thesaban tambon) which covers parts of the tambon Paluru. There are a further six tambon administrative organizations (TAO).

| No. | Name | Thai name | Malay name | Villages | Pop. |
|---|---|---|---|---|---|
| 1. | Paluru | ปะลุรู | Peluru (ڤلورو) | 8 | 17,046 |
| 2. | Su-ngai Padi | สุไหงปาดี | Sungai Padi (سوڠاي ڤادي) | 12 | 7,991 |
| 3. | Todeng | โต๊ะเด็ง | Tok Deng (توء ديڠ) | 5 | 6,912 |
| 4. | Sako | สากอ | Saga (ساݢ) | 12 | 10,048 |
| 5. | Riko | ริโก๋ | Rikul (ريكول) | 7 | 6,789 |
| 6. | Kawa | กาวะ | Kawat (كاوت) | 6 | 5,309 |
