= Su-ngai Kolok district =

Su-ngai Kolok สุไหงโก-ลก
- District
- District location in Narathiwat province
- Coordinates: 6°1′46″N 101°57′58″E
- Country: Thailand
- Province: Narathiwat
- Seat: Su-ngai Kolok

Area
  - Total: 138.3 km^{2} (53.4 sq mi)

Population (2005)
  - Total: 69,757
  - Density: 504.4/km^{2} (1,306/sq mi)
- Time zone: UTC+7 (ICT)
- Postal code: 96120
- Geocode: 9610

Su-ngai Kolok (Thai: สุไหงโก-ลก, pronounced [sū.ŋǎj kōː.lók]) is a district (amphoe) of Narathiwat province, southern Thailand.

== History ==
The minor district (king amphoe) was created on 2 January 1948, consisting of the three tambons: Su-ngai Kolok, Puyo, and Pase Mat from Su-ngai Padi district and Muno from Tak Bai district. In 1953 it was upgraded to a full district.

== Geography ==
Neighboring districts are (from the southwest clockwise) Waeng, Su-ngai Padi and Tak Bai. To the southeast is the state Kelantan of Malaysia.

The main water resource is the Kolok River.

== Administration ==
The district is divided into four sub-districts (tambons), which are further subdivided into 19 villages (mubans). Su-ngai Kolok itself has town (thesaban mueang) status and covers most parts of the same-named tambon.

No.	Name	Thai name	Villages	Pop.
1.	Su-ngai Kolok	สุไหงโก-ลก	1	38,756
2.	Pase Mat	ปาเสมัส	7	16,765
3.	Muno	มูโนะ	5	8,553
4.	Puyo	ปูโยะ	6	5,683
