= Buke Ta =

Buke Ta บูเก๊ะตา
- Location in Thailand
- Coordinates: 5°50′36″N 101°52′53″E
- Country: Thailand
- Province: Narathiwat
- District: Amphoe Waeng

Population (2007)
  - Total: 4,079
- Postal code: 96160

Buke Ta (Thai: บูเก๊ะตา, pronounced [būː.kéʔ tāː]; Malay: Bukit Tal) is a subdistrict municipality (thesaban tambon) in Waeng district, Narathiwat Province, Thailand. It covers an area of 7.04 km^{2} (2.72 sq mi) of the subdistrict Lochut, and as of 2007 has a population of 4,079. The municipality lies west of the Kolok River.

== History ==
The municipality was created as a sanitary district (sukhaphiban) in 1993. Like all sanitary districts it was upgraded to a subdistrict municipality in 1999.

== Traffic ==
A crossing on the Malaysia-Thailand border to the neighboring Malaysian town of Bukit Bunga in Kelantan state was opened in December 2007, crossing the Kolok River with the Bukit Bunga–Ban Buketa Bridge.
