= Su-ngai Kolok =

Sungai Kolok สุไหงโกลก
- Subdistrict and town municipality
- เทศบาลเมืองสุไหงโกลก; Sungai Kolok town municipality
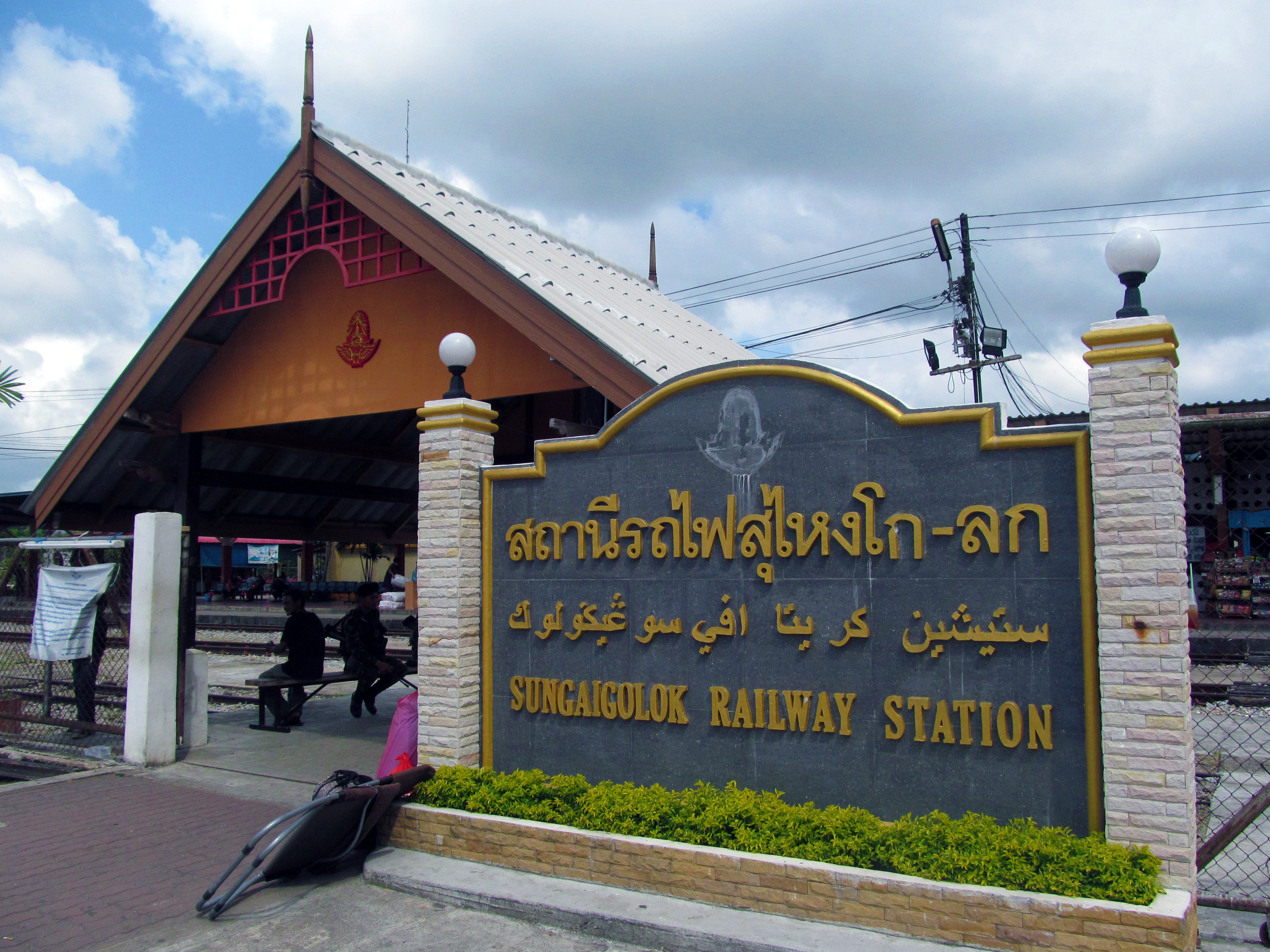
- Sungai Kolok railway station

- Location in Thailand
- Coordinates: 6°2′N 101°58′E
- Country: Thailand
- Province: Narathiwat
- District: Sungai Kolok

Population (2005)
  - Total: 38,612
- Time zone: UTC+7 (ICT)

Sungai Kolok (Thai: สุไหงโกลก, Malay: Sungai Golok) is a border town and subdistrict on the Malaysia-Thailand Border in Su-ngai Kolok district, Narathiwat Province, Thailand. It is one of the largest and most prosperous districts in Narathiwat Province. It is also one of the major economic centers in the southern part of Thailand. It is the capital of the Su-ngai Kolok District. As of 2005, the town (thesaban mueang) had a population of 38,612. Across the border is Rantau Panjang, Kelantan, Malaysia.

== Geography ==
Sungai Kolok is in the southeastern part of the province. Adjacent areas are: in the north is Sungai Padi and Tak Bai; in the east, Kelantan (Malaysia); in the south, Kelantan (Malaysia) and Wan; in the west Su-ngai Padi.

== Etymology ==
The word "sungai" is Malay and means 'river'. Golok is also Malay and means 'traditional sword'. Therefore, Sungai Golok means 'sword river'.

== History ==
The township was upgraded to town (thesaban mueang) status on 20 February 2004.
