= Pengkalan Kubor =

Human settlement in Malaysia

Pengkalan Kubor Kaley Kubo (Kelantan-Pattani Malay)
- Town
- Location of Pengkalan Kubor Pengkalan Kubor (Peninsular Malaysia) Pengkalan Kubor (Malaysia)
- Coordinates: 6°13′58.74″N 102°5′27.40″E
- Country: Malaysia
- State: Kelantan
- District: Tumpat
- Time zone: UTC+8 (MYT)
- Postal code: 16080

Pengkalan Kubor (Kelantanese: Kaley Kubo, Jawi: ڤڠكالن‌ قبور) is a small coastal border town in Tumpat District, Kelantan, Malaysia, bordering Tak Bai, Narathiwat, Thailand across the estuary of the Golok River.
