= Waeng district =

Waeng แว้ง
- District
- District location in Narathiwat province
- Coordinates: 5°55′41″N 101°53′2″E
- Country: Thailand
- Province: Narathiwat
- Seat: Waeng

Area
  - Total: 347.3 km^{2} (134.1 sq mi)

Population (2005)
  - Total: 47,314
  - Density: 136.2/km^{2} (353/sq mi)
- Time zone: UTC+7 (ICT)
- Postal code: 96160
- Geocode: 9608

Waeng (Thai: แว้ง, pronounced [wɛ́ːŋ]) is the southernmost district (amphoe) of Narathiwat province, southern Thailand.

== History ==
The district dates back to the Tomo District (โต๊ะโมะ), which was a subordinate of Mueang Ra-ngae. The village grew bigger because of the gold mining there. In 1935 a minor district (king amphoe) covering the central part of Tomo was established and named Pacho (ปาโจ). In 1939 the minor district received the name "Tomo" because it contained the sub-district named "Tomo", and the parent district was renamed "Waeng". In 1953 the minor district Tomo was abolished and included in Waeng again. In 1957 the Sub-district Tomo was also abolished and included in Sub-district Samong, which then formed part of area split off as minor district Sukhirin in 1977.

== Geography ==
Neighboring districts are (from the west clockwise): Sukhirin, Su-ngai Padi, and Su-ngai Kolok. To the south is the Kelantan state of Malaysia.

At the village of Ban Buketa, is a Malaysia-Thailand border border crossing to the neighboring Malaysian town of Bukit Bunga. A part of Hala-Bala wildlife sanctuary is in the district.

== Administration ==
The district is divided into six sub-districts (tambons), which are further subdivided into 45 villages (mubans). There are two townships (thesaban tambon) within the district. Waeng covers parts of the tambon Waeng, and Buketa covers parts of tambon Lochut.

| No. | Name | Thai name | Villages | Pop. |
|---|---|---|---|---|
| 1. | Waeng | แว้ง | 7 | 12,465 |
| 2. | Kayukhla | กายูคละ | 9 | 7,308 |
| 3. | Kholo | ฆอเลาะ | 7 | 6,700 |
| 4. | Lochut | โละจูด | 8 | 10,677 |
| 5. | Mae Dong | แม่ดง | 7 | 6,009 |
| 6. | Erawan | เอราวัณ | 7 | 4,155 |
