= Bukit Bunga =

Coordinates: 5.837647°N 101.902914°E

Bukit Bunga is a village in Tanah Merah District, Kelantan, Malaysia. It is located at the Malaysia-Thailand border and is the latest border crossing between Malaysia and Thailand, with the opening of the Bukit Bunga-Ban Buketa Bridge on December 21, 2007.

Across the border is the Thai town of Ban Buketa in Amphoe Waeng, Narathiwat Province.

Bukit Bunga is 30 km from Tanah Merah along the East-West Highway. It comprises several smaller kampungs: Bukit Nangka, Cedok, Tokpe, Kampung Bukit, Renab, and Jenub. The hub revolves around the Bukit Bunga mosque.

In the past few decades, Bukit Bunga has become one of the main entry points to Thailand from Malaysia. It had its own police station in 1981 and has a school, a customs department, and an immigration department. Lately, it has become a hub for local tourists searching for Thai goods.
