= Narathiwat province =

Coordinates: 6°25′44″N 101°49′26″E

Narathiwat นราธิวาส
- Province

Other transcription(s)
  - Jawi: منارا (Jawi)
  - Rumi: Menara (Rumi)
  - Chinese: 陶公府 (Simplified)
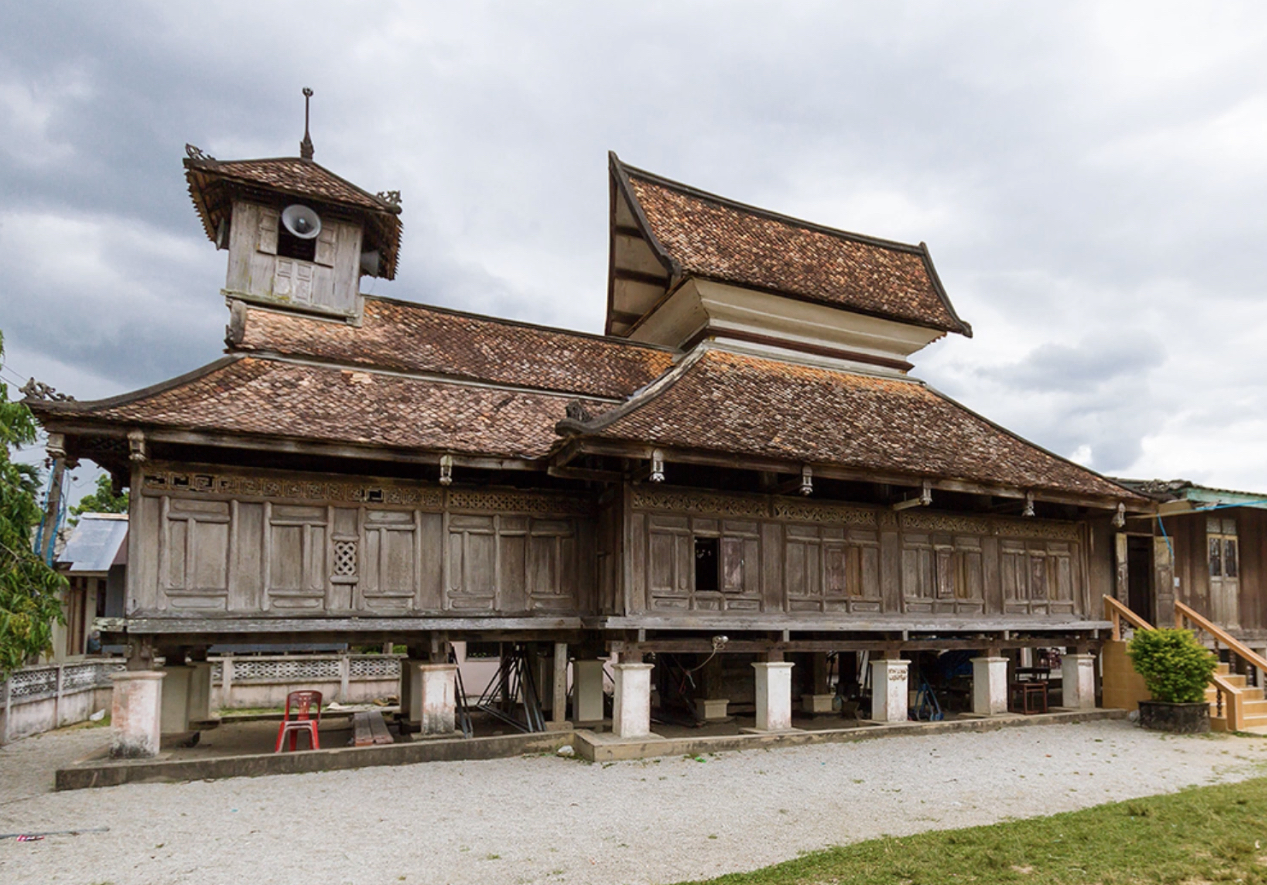
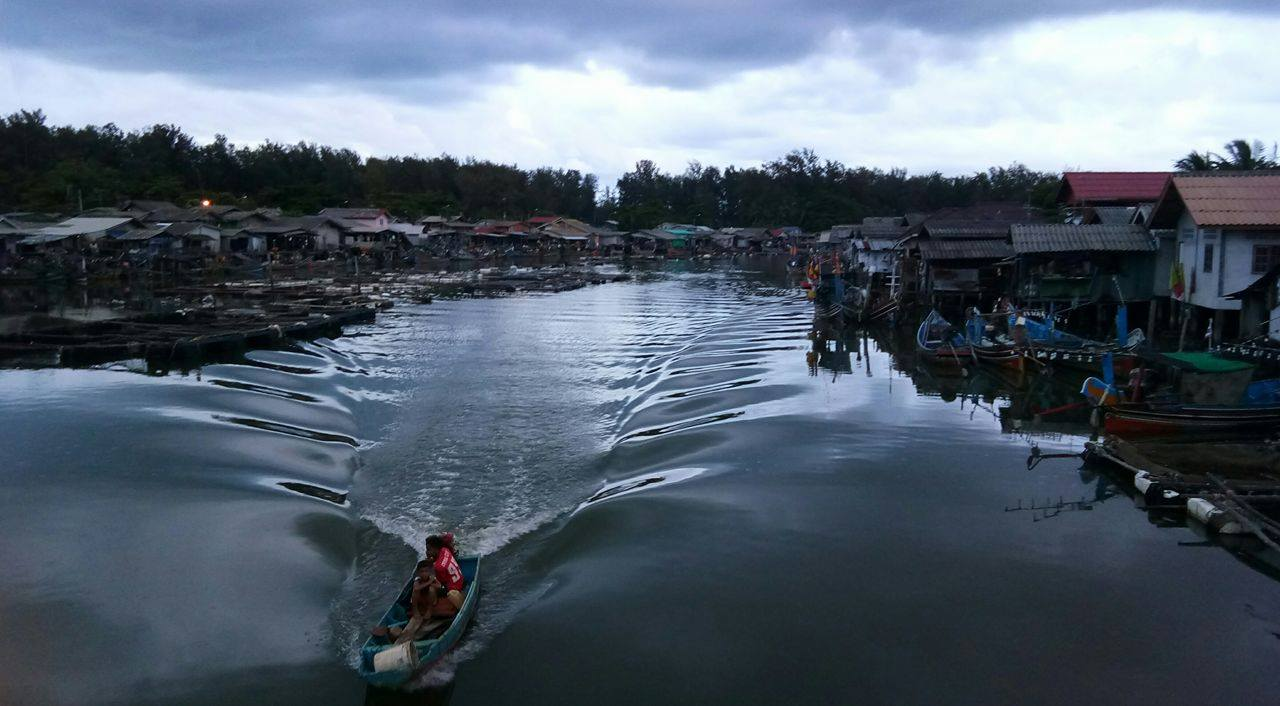
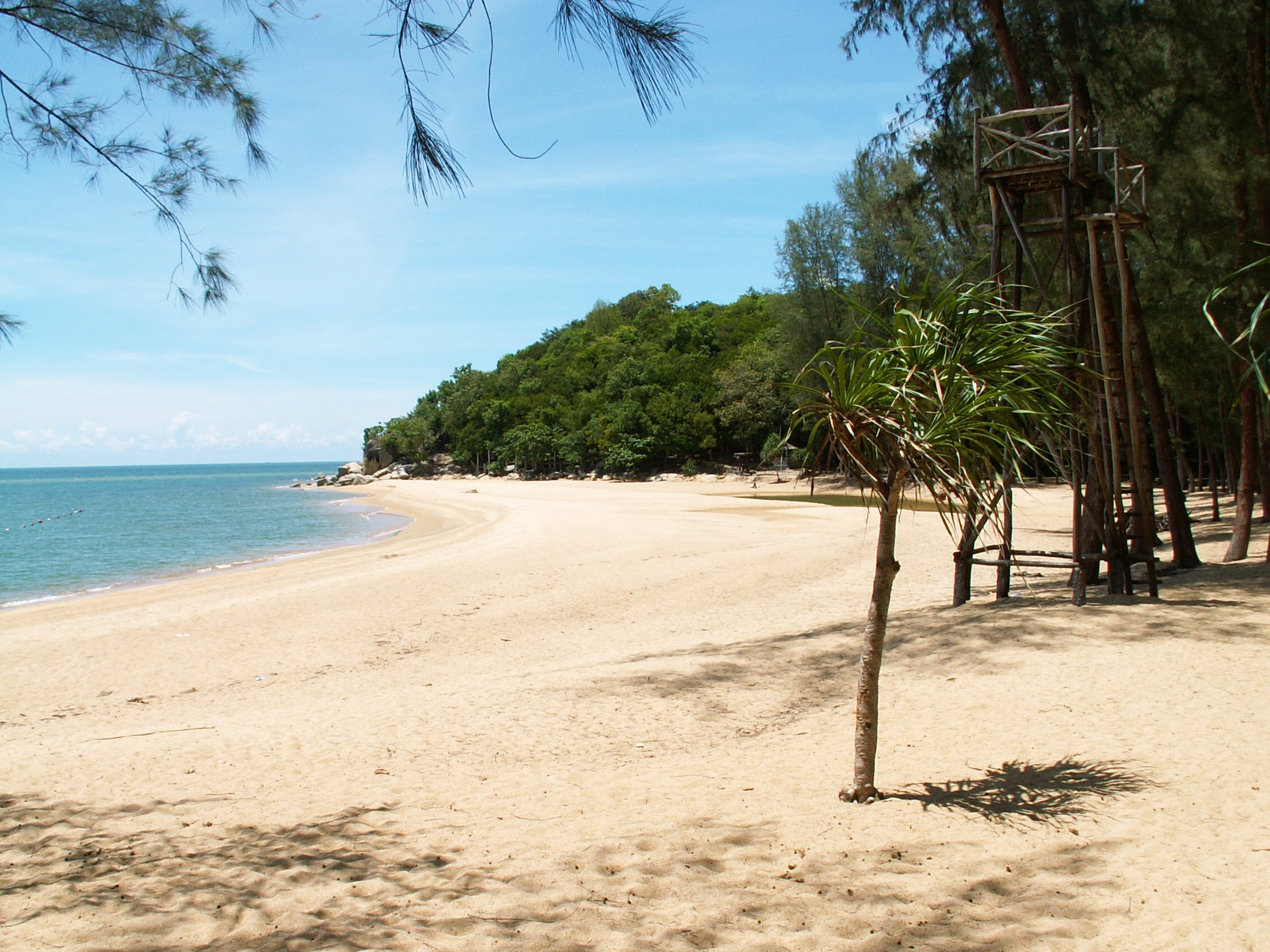
- From top: The Mosque with 300 Years old building; The eponymous Bang Nara River; Narathat Beach

- Flag Seal
- Nickname: Bang Nara
- Mottoes: ทักษิณราชตำหนัก ชนรักศาสนา นราทัศน์เพลินตา ปาโจตรึงใจ แหล่งใหญ่แร่ทอง ลองกองหอมหวาน ("Thaksin Ratchaniwet Palace, Religious people, Pleasant Narathat (Beach), Fascinating Pacho (Waterfall), Great source of gold and mineral, Fragrant and sweet longan")
- Map of Thailand highlighting Narathiwat province
- Country: Thailand
- Capital: Narathiwat

Government
  - Type: Province and Provincial Administrative Organization
  - Body: Narathiwat Province and Narathiwat Provincial Administrative Organization
  - Governor: Boonchuay Homyanyen
  - PAO Chief Executive: Kuseng Yawhasan

Area
  - Total: 4,491 km^{2} (1,734 sq mi)
  - Rank: 48th

Population (2024)
  - Total: ▼823,996
  - Rank: 29th
  - Density: 183/km^{2} (470/sq mi)
  - Rank: 16th

Human Achievement Index
  - HAI (2022): 0.6233 "low" Ranked 64th

GDP
  - Total: baht 43 billion (US$1.4 billion) (2019)
- Time zone: UTC+7 (ICT)
- Postal code: 96xxx
- Calling code: 073
- ISO 3166 code: TH-96
- Website: narathiwat.go.th narathiwatpao.go.th

Narathiwat (Thai: นราธิวาส, pronounced [nā.rāː.tʰí.wâːt]; Malay: Menara) is one of the southern provinces (changwat) of Thailand. Neighbouring provinces are (from west clockwise) Yala and Pattani. To the south it borders the Malaysian states of Kelantan and Perak. The southern railway line ends in this province, which is one of the nation's four provinces that border Malaysia. The province features a range of cultures as well as natural resources, and is relatively fertile. Narathiwat is about 1,140 kilometers south of Bangkok and has an area of 4,475 km^{2} (1,728 sq mi). Seventy-five percent of the area is jungle and mountains and has a tropical climate.

== Toponymy ==
The former name of Narathiwat was Menara (Jawi: منارا), meaning 'minaret' or 'tower' in Malay, the pre-Islamic name is unknown. This became Bang Nara (Thai: บางนรา) or Bang Nak (Thai: บางนาค) in Thai, but was changed to Narathiwat by King Rama VI in 1915. "Narathiwat", from the Sanskrit (Nara+adhivāsa), means the residence of wise people.

== History ==
Inscribed bricks have been recorded at Khok It, and a Buddha image of Amaravati type at Su-ngai Kolok.

Historically, Narathiwat was the part of the semi-independent Malay Sultanate of Patani, paying tribute to the Thai kingdoms of Sukhothai and Siamese Ayutthaya Kingdom. After the fall of Ayutthaya in 1767, the Sultanate of Patani gained full independence but returned under Thai control during the reign of King Rama I (r. 1782–1809), 18 years later, and in the early–1800s was divided into seven smaller kingdoms.

In 1909, Narathiwat was fully integrated into Siam as part of Anglo-Siamese Treaty of 1909 negotiated with the British Empire. Along with Yala, Narathiwat was then part of Monthon Pattani.

== Geography ==
Narathiwat province is on the Gulf of Thailand, on the Malay Peninsula. The Bang Nara is the main river and enters the Gulf of Thailand at the town of Narathiwat. Narathat Beach, the most popular in the province, is near the estuary. The total forest area is 1,196 km^{2} (462 sq mi) or 26.6 percent of provincial area.

=== National parks ===
There are three national parks, along with two other national parks, make up region 6 (Pattani branch) of Thailand's protected areas. Budo–Su-ngai Padi National Park is in the Sankalakhiri mountain range. Established on 17 June 1999, extending into neighbouring Yala and Pattani provinces. The main attraction is Pacho Waterfall. (Visitors in fiscal year 2024)

Budo–Su-ngai Padi National Park	341 km^{2} (132 sq mi)	(29,966)
Namtok Si Po National Park	66 km^{2} (25 sq mi)	(17,700)
Ao Manao-Khao Tanyong National Park	23 km^{2} (8.9 sq mi)	(112,424)

=== Wildlife sanctuaries ===
There are two wildlife sanctuaries in region 6 (Pattani branch) and they are the protected areas in Narathiwat province.

Hala-Bala Wildlife Sanctuary	626 km^{2} (242 sq mi)
Somdet Phra Thepparat Wildlife Sanctuary	201 km^{2} (78 sq mi)

Location protected areas of Narathiwat

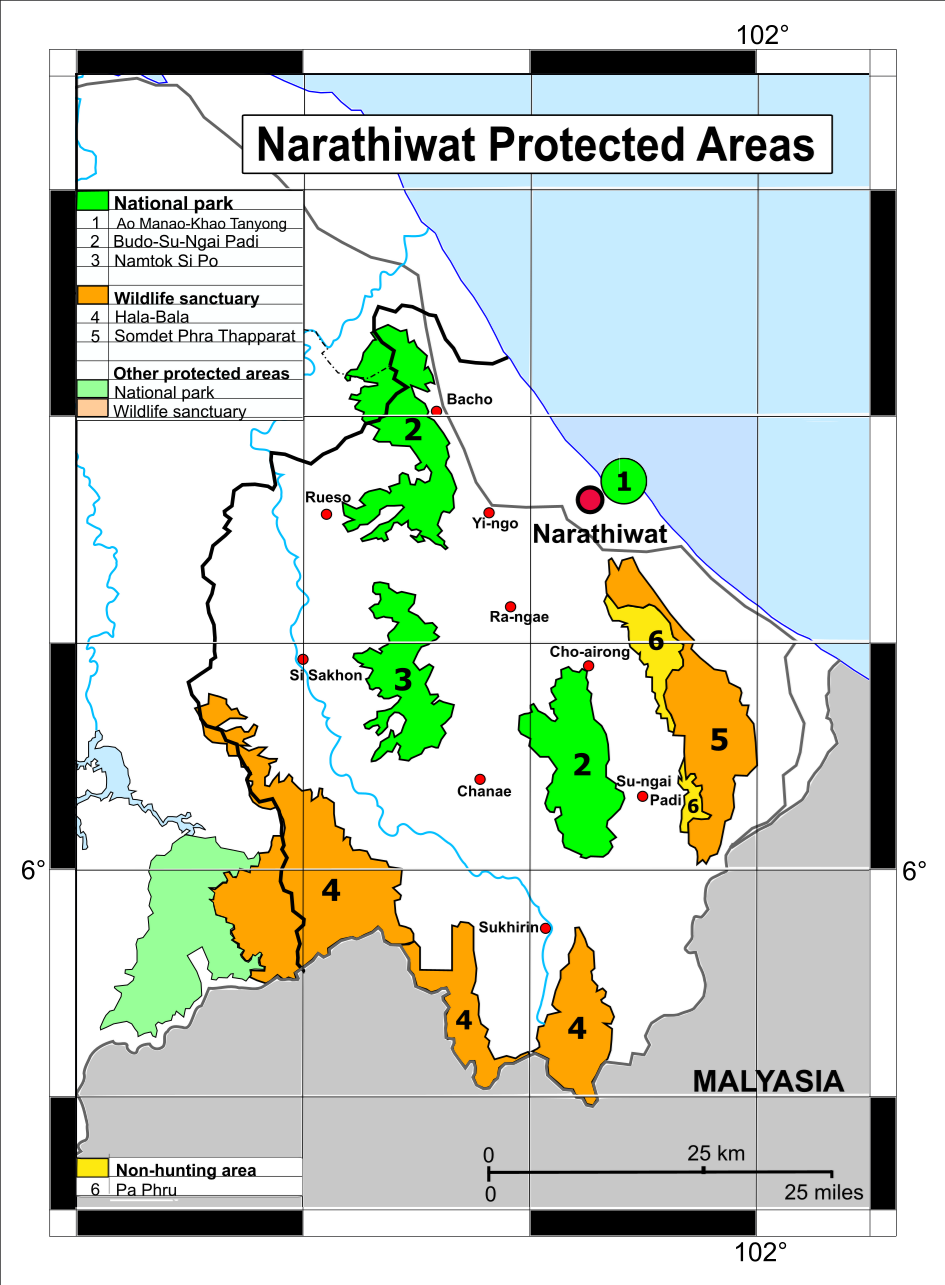
Narathiwat protected areas

	National park
1	Ao Manao– Khao Tanyong
2	Budo- Su-ngai Padi
3	Namtok Si Po

	Wild.sanct.
4	Hala-Bala
5	Somdet; Phra Thepparat

	N-hunt area
6	Pa Phru

== Demographics ==
Narathiwat is one of four Thai provinces (along with Yala, Pattani, and Satun) with a predominantly Muslim population; 82% are Muslim and 17.9% are Buddhist. Also 80.4% speak the Patani Malay as their first language. Narathiwat Malays are very similar in ethnicity and culture to the Malays of Kelantan, Malaysia.

In 1963, the Thai government launched the Nikhom Sang Ton Eng Pak Tai ('self-development community in the south') program to move families from Thailand's northeastern and central provinces to the Sukhirin and Chanae Districts of Narathiwat. A total of 5,633 families were relocated to Narathiwat, where each family was rewarded with 18 rai of land. In Phukhao Thong Subdistrict as of 2019, most inhabitants migrated from the Northeast region. They speak Isan and are 90% Theravadin Buddhists in what is a predominantly Muslim province.

The inhabitants of Narathiwat are largely farmers and fishermen. Narathiwat is an area with various religious places of historical significance.

== Symbols ==
The provincial seal shows a sailing boat with a white elephant on the sail. A white elephant is a royal symbol, and was put on the seal to commemorate the white elephant Phra Sri Nararat Rajakarini which was caught here and presented to the king.

The provincial symbol is the longkong fruit (Lansium parasiticum). The provincial tree is the Chengal (Neobalanocarpus heimii), and the provincial flower is the Odontadenia macrantha. The ornamental fish harlequin rasbora (Trigonostigma heteromorpha), are fish that live in swampy water conditions. In Thailand, they are found only in Narathiwat's Pa Phru To Daeng, and on the ground, this species of cyprinid is the provincial aquatic life.

== Administrative divisions ==
=== Provincial government ===
Narathiwat is divided into 13 districts (amphoe), which are further divided into 77 subdistricts (tambon) and 551 villages (muban).

Map of thirteen districts

No.	Name	Thai	Jawi	Malay
1	Mueang Narathiwat	เมืองนราธิวาส	منارا	Menara
2	Tak Bai	ตากใบ	تابا	Taba
3	Bacho	บาเจาะ	باچك	Bahcok
4	Yi-ngo	ยี่งอ	جريڠ	Jeringo
5	Ra-ngae	ระแงะ	ليگيه	Legeh
6	Rueso	รือเสาะ	روسو،جابا	Ruso, Jaba
7	Si Sakhon	ศรีสาคร	ساكا، كوال كاواي	Saka, Kuala Kaway
8	Waeng	แว้ง	رأويڠ	Raweang
9	Sukhirin	สุคิริน	فاجاك	Pajak
10	Su-ngai Kolok	สุไหงโก-ลก	سوڠاي گولوك	Sungai Golok
11	Su-ngai Padi	สุไหงปาดี	سوڠاي فادي	Sungai Padi
12	Chanae	จะแนะ	چيني	Cene
13	Cho-airong	เจาะไอร้อง	جوك ايروڠ	Jok Irong

=== Local government ===
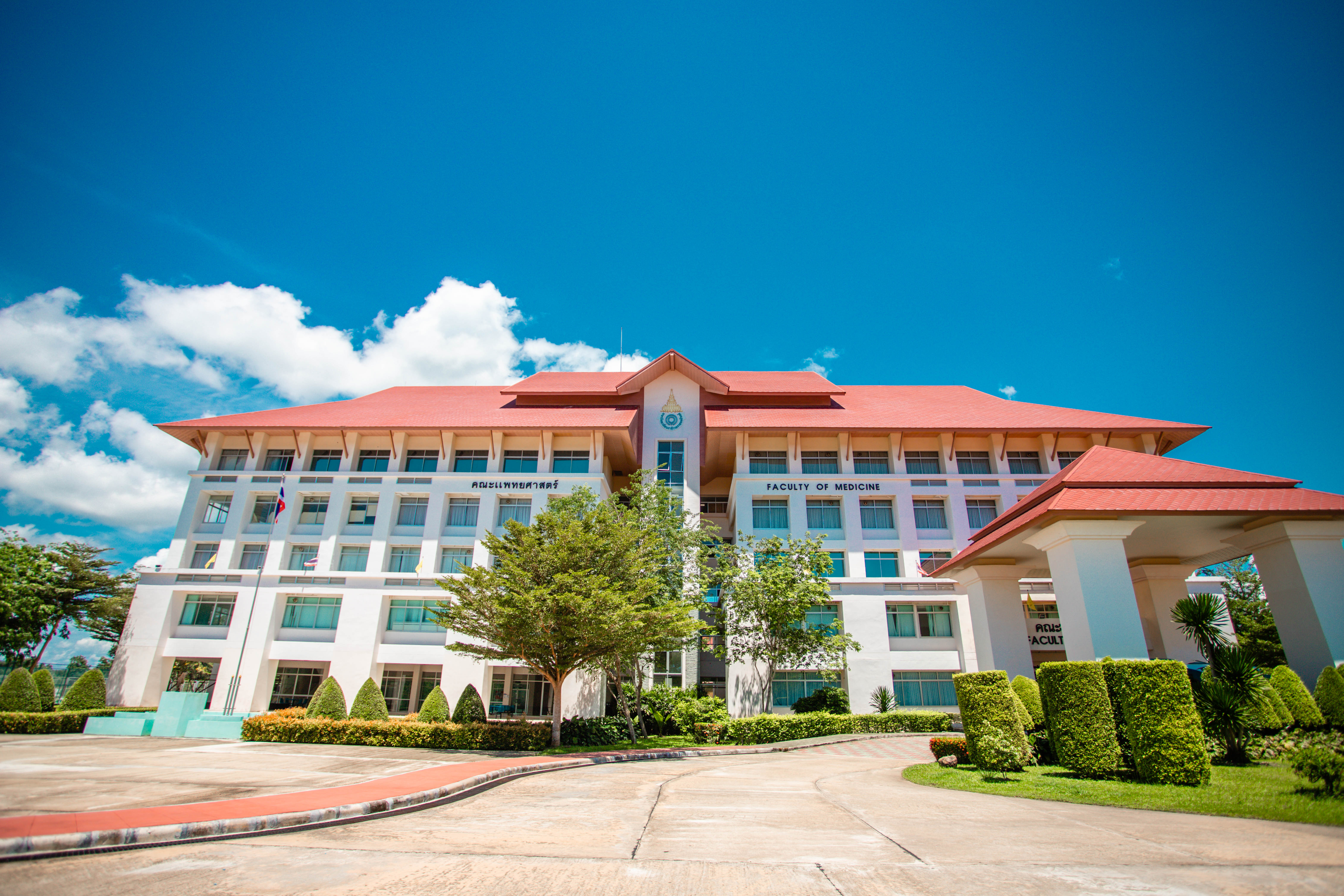
Princess of Naradhiwas University

As of 26 November 2019 there are: one Narathiwat Provincial Administration Organisation (ongkan borihan suan changwat) and 16 municipal (thesaban) areas in the province. Narathiwat, Sungai Kolok and Tak Bai have town (thesaban mueang) status. Further 13 subdistrict municipalities (thesaban tambon). The non-municipal areas are administered by 72 Subdistrict Administrative Organisations – SAO (ongkan borihan suan tambon).

== Education ==
Princess of Naradhiwas University is a university in Narathiwat province which aims to distribute the equality, equity, and opportunity to local citizen by merging all educational institutions in the province. Those institutions are Narathiwat Technical College, Narathiwat Agricultural & Technology College, Takbai Vocational College, and Boromarjonani College of Nursing, Narathiwat.

== Transportation ==
=== Air ===
As of January 2026 Narathiwat Airport (Code: NAW) has two direct flights from and to Bangkok's Don Mueang Airport (DMK) daily, as well as one direct flight from and to Bangkok's Suvarnabhumi Airport (BKK). All three flights arrive at and depart from NAW between the late morning to early afternoon hours. These are all operated by Air Asia, the only airline currently offering flights to and from Narathiwat.

=== Rail ===
Although there is no direct access to Mueang Narathiwat District, Narathiwat's main railway station and nearest to Mueang District is Tanyong Mat Railway Station, on the Southern Line, in Ra-ngae District. Other major stations along the line in Narathiwat include Rueso, Su-ngai Kolok, Su-ngai Padi and Cho-airong. Distance to Narathiwat by rail is roughly 1100 kilometres from Bangkok Railway Station.

=== Road ===
Highway 42 is considered as main highway in Narathiwat and its terminus, Su-ngai Kolok.

== Health ==
Narathiwat is mostly served by public hospitals. Its main hospital is Naradhiwas Rajanagarindra Hospital and the province has one university hospital which is Galyanivadhanakarun Hospital of the Faculty of Medicine, Princess of Naradhiwas University.

== Human achievement index 2022 ==
Health	Education	Employment	Income
26	75	54	42
Housing	Family	Transport	Participation
56	1	38	59
Province Narathiwat, with an HAI 2022 value of 0.6233 is "low", occupies place 64 in the ranking.

Since 2003, United Nations Development Programme (UNDP) in Thailand has tracked progress on human development at sub-national level using the Human achievement index (HAI), a composite index covering all the eight key areas of human development. National Economic and Social Development Board (NESDB) has taken over this task since 2017.

Rank	Classification
1 - 13	"high"
14 - 29	"somewhat high"
30 - 45	"average"
46 - 61	"somewhat low"
62 - 77	"low"

Map with provinces and HAI 2022 rankings

== Recent history ==
There has been growing violence in southern Thailand since 4 January 2004, especially in the majority Muslim provinces of Narathiwat, Yala, and Pattani. Most of the inhabitants of these provinces are ethnic Malays, though the cities are mainly Thai, Thai Chinese, and Indian. Violent mujahideen activity has happened since the 1980s, but this lessened when Thaksin Shinawatra became prime minister in 2001.

Most of the violence has been directed towards the minority Buddhist population in the province.

== Religious sites ==
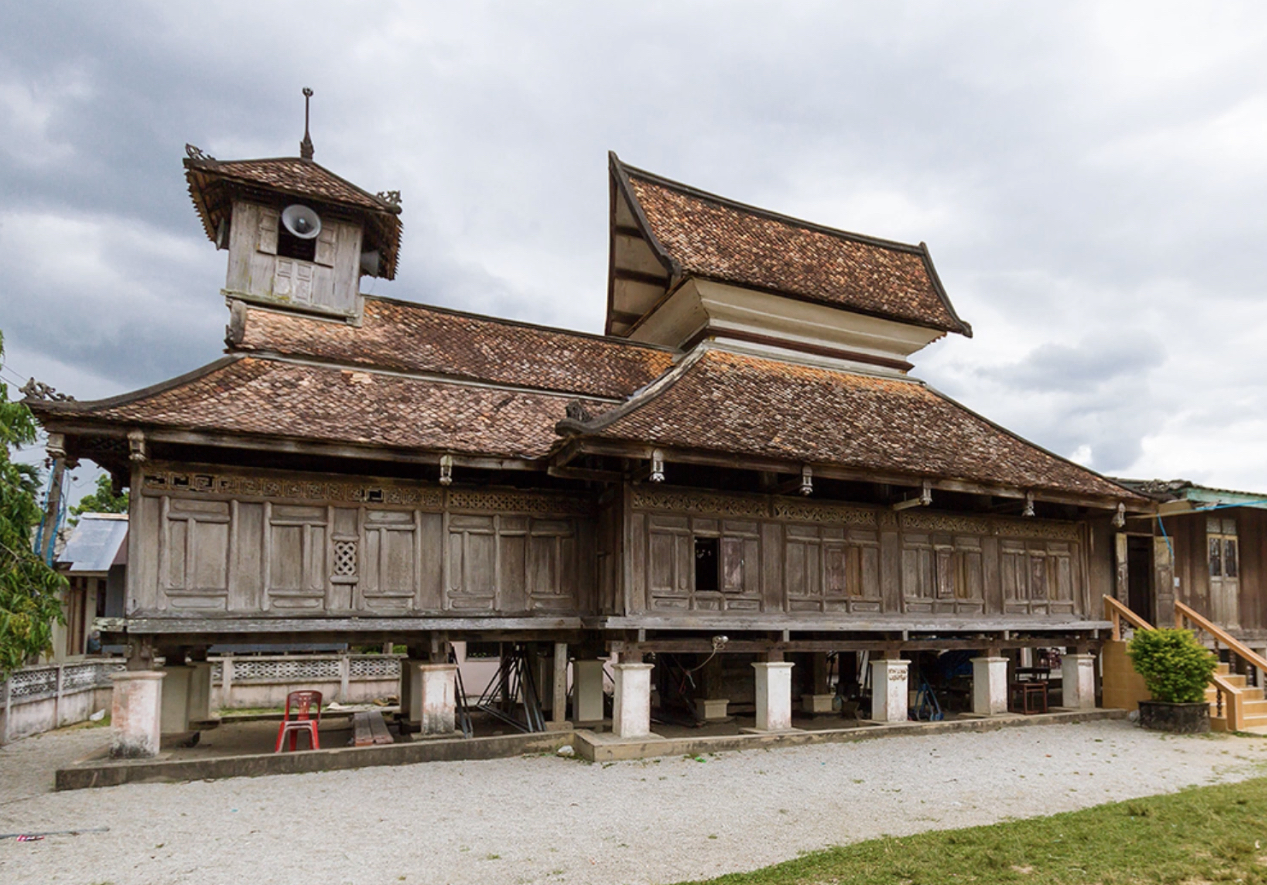
300 Years Mosque

=== Central Mosque of Narathiwat ===
The important religious site for Muslims is the central mosque of Narathiwat. This mosque is on Pitchitbamrung Road, Tambon Bangnark, Amphoe Muang, about 1 kilometer from the provincial town. This mosque is the center for Thai Muslims who come to worship on Fridays. It was built in 1981 in a three-storied Arabian-style building with a high tower and a domed roof as other mosques. The tower is used to call Muslims to prayer.

=== Khao Kong Buddhist Park ===
A minority of the people in Narathiwat are Buddhist. Although a minority, there are Buddhist temples in the same amphoe as the mosque. These include Khao Kong Buddhist Park, which occupies an area of 142 rai (227,200 square metres (2,446,000 sq ft)) in Tambon Lamphu about nine kilometers from town on the Narathiwat-Rangae Road.

==== Phra Buddha Thaksin Ming Mongkol ====
The main attraction in this site is a southern Buddha image, the golden "Pra Buddha Thaksin Ming Monkol", which is seated in the lotus position and giving posture. "This mountaintop Buddha image which is considered to be the most beautiful and largest (17 meters wide and 24 meters high) outdoor Buddha image in southern Thailand is decorated in the South Indian style". It is highly respected by locals and Buddhists in the south.

== Notable residents ==
- Thawatchai Sajakul (born 1943), Thailand national football team manager and politician
- Naraporn Chan-o-cha (born 1954), spouse of prime minister of Thailand (Prayuth Chan-o-cha)
- Attachai Anantameak (born 1965), actor and political activist
- Jirayut (born 2001), singer and actor whose famous in Indonesia
