= Hala-Bala Wildlife Sanctuary =

Wildlife sanctuary in Narathiwat province, Thailand

Coordinates: 5°47′42.7″N 101°49′41.9″E

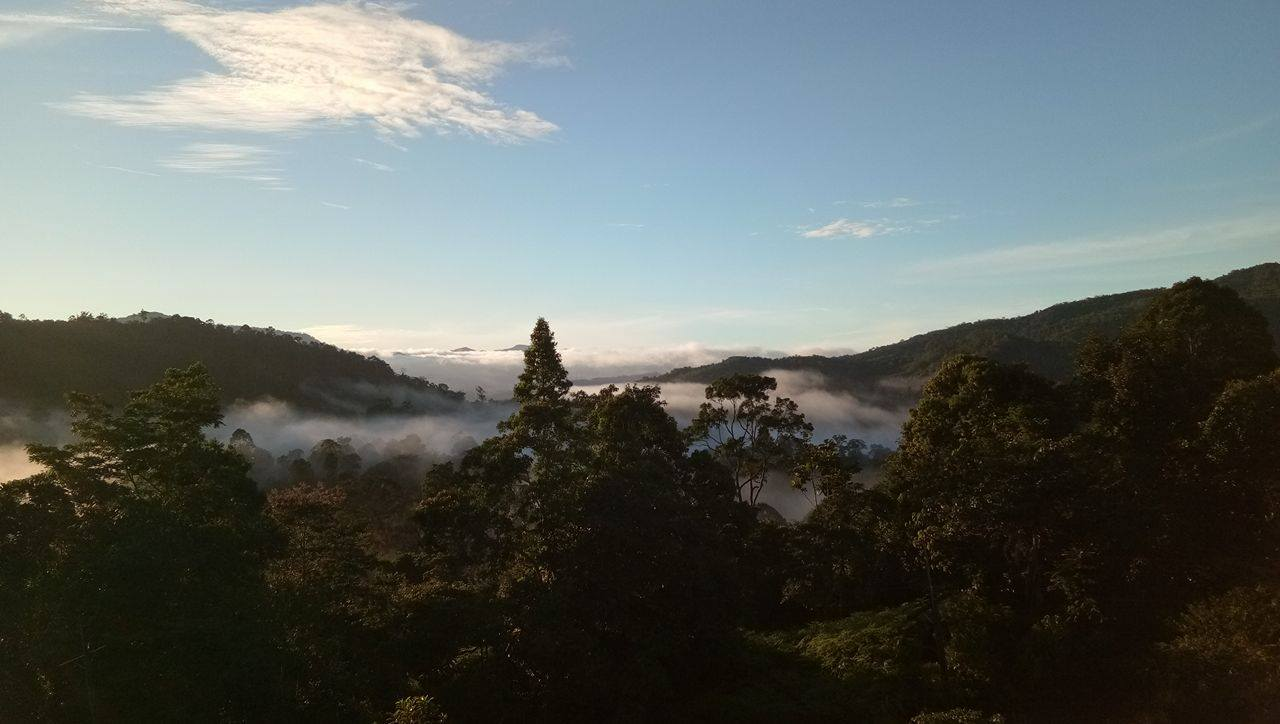
Hala-Bala Wildlife Sanctuary.

Hala-Bala Wildlife Sanctuary (Thai: เขตรักษาพันธุ์สัตว์ป่าฮาลา-บาลา) is a wildlife sanctuary in Thailand, considered to be one of the richest forests of Thailand in the southernmost part of the country. It is dubbed "Amazon of Asean". It was officially established in 1996. Its area is 391,689 rais ~ 626.7 km^{2} (242.0 sq mi) which covers the area of Titiwangsa Range and is adjacent to Belum-Temengor Reserve of Malaysia.

== Geography ==
The Hala-Bala Wildlife Sanctuary is a preserved forest comprising two forestland: Hala forest in Betong district in Yala province and Chanae district in Narathiwat province, with Bala forest in Waeng and Sukhirin districts in Narathiwat province. For Waeng people, it is called "Bala-Hala", but for locals in Betong, it is called "Hala-Bala".

The forest was named after Khlong Bala, a natural khlong (canal) that flows into the Bang Lang Reservoir in Yala, which is a large stream originating from a tropical rainforest with tributaries from the Hala Mountaintop. It features a watershed forest situated in the deep forest adjacent to the Malaysian border.

== Flora ==
In the part of rare plants that can be found in this forest, for example golden leaved liana, or locally called Yan Da-o (Bauhinia aureifolia), an endemic plant in Thailand found only in Narathiwat, Yala, and Pattani provinces. Maha Sadam (Cyathea podophylla), a kind of fern, used to be food of dinosaurs that can make feels like returning to a primeval forest, and is a home of largest baing tree (Tetrameles nudiflora) in Thailand as well.

== Fauna ==
The wildlife sanctuary is home to various wild animals. Rare preserved wild animals have been traced as a variety of hornbill species have been covered. Seasonally, flocks of a hundred to a thousand hornbills are found in the area. In particular, there are large and small flocks of plain-pouched hornbill (Rhyticeros subruficollis) annually migrating from the Huai Kha Khaeng Wildlife Sanctuary in central and western regions to this area in May, which number about 500 or more in total. Hala-Bala is also a habitat of up to 10 hornbills from a total of 13 species found in Thailand, such as rhinoceros hornbill (Buceros rhinoceros) that can be closely seen along the Ban To Mo-Ban Bala route, including rare species helmeted hornbill (Rhinoplax vigil) as well.

Also, large wild animals like gaurs (Bos gaurus) are often found in the grassland by Khlong Bala. All of these point that the Hala forest is a complete tropical rainforest that is enriched by plants, wildlife, and a variety of bird species including biodiversity, which maintain the balance of nature in this forest.

=== Diversity of wildlife ===
In the sanctuary are: 179 species of mammals, 384 species of birds, 130 species of reptiles and 61 species of amphibians.
Six species are considered critically endangered (CR):

- Asian tri-coloured squirrel
- Black-handed gibbon
- Flat-headed cat
- Hairy-nosed otter
- Otter civet
- Wildcat

Six species are considered endangered (EN):

- Asian elephant
- Asian palm civet
- Malayan tapir
- Muntjac
- Striped civet
- Tiger

The following fifteen species are considered vulnerable (VU):

- Black-eared squirrel
- Black panther
- Clouded leopard
- Dhole
- Dusky leaf monkey
- Fishing cat
- Gaur
- Gibbon
- Leopard
- Lesser bamboo rat
- Nilgiri langur
- Smooth-coated otter
- Striped civet
- Sun bear
- Three-striped ground squirrel

== Cannibal tribes ==
There is a legend of cannibal tribes in the region called the Batow (บาเตาะ) and it has been made into a movie in 2025 called Hala Bala.

== Location ==
Hala-Bala Wildlife Sanctuary in overview PARO 6 (Pattani branch)

6) Hala-Bala Wildlife Sanctuary in overview PARO 6 (Pattani branch)

	National park
1	Ao Manao–Khao Tanyong
2	Bang Lang
3	Budo-Su-ngai Padi
4	Namtok Sai Khao
5	Namtok Si Po

	Wildlife sanctuary
6	Hala-Bala
7	Somdet Phra Thepparat

	Non-hunting area
8	Pa Phru

== See also ==
- List of protected areas of Thailand
- DNP - Hala-Bala Wildlife Sanctuary
