= Aiyoeweng Subdistrict =

Subdistrict in Yala Province

Coordinates: 5.97732°N 101.18224°E

Aiyoeweng or spelled Aiyoe Weng (Note: It can also be spelled in other ways, such as Aiyerweng, Iyerweng.) (Thai: อัยเยอร์เวง) is a tambon (subdistrict) in Betong district, Yala province, lower southern Thailand.

== Area overview ==
The name Aiyoeweng consists of two elements; "Aiyoe" is Yawi language means waterway, referring to the natural canal runs through this area, and "Weng" is Chinese race family name who is pioneer among those who settled here.

It is a place that is well known in terms of being a tourist destination. There are many attractions that are beautiful and impressive. The most famous is Aiyoeweng Sea of Mist, a mountaintop viewpoint where visitors can see the sea of mist all year round, and has a cool temperature like abroad. It serves by glass walkway towering above 2,038 m (6,686.4 ft) sea level. The tower is a six-story building. Its third story is the highlight as it has a 63 m (206.7 ft) long glass floor corridor leads to a glass floor viewing terrace.

From up here visitors can see reservoir of Bang Lang Dam, the further sight is Hala-Bala Wildlife Sanctuary and sometime the sighting could be as far as Thailand neighbouring country, Malaysia. Sometime the mist lingers on until midday. The best time to visit is 06.00 am.

== Geography ==
Aiyoeweng is 32 km (19.9 mi) from downtown Betong, and about 100 km (62.1 mi) from city of Yala. Total area is 476,875 rais or 818.72 km^{2}.

== Population ==
In 2017, it had a total population of 11,703 (6,199 male, 5,504 female) people in 4,644 households.

== Administration ==
The entire area is governed by the Aiyoeweng Subdistrict Administrative Organization.

Aiyoeweng is also divided into 11 mubans (villages).
