= Bang Lang National Park =

National park in Yala province, Thailand

- IUCN category II (national park)
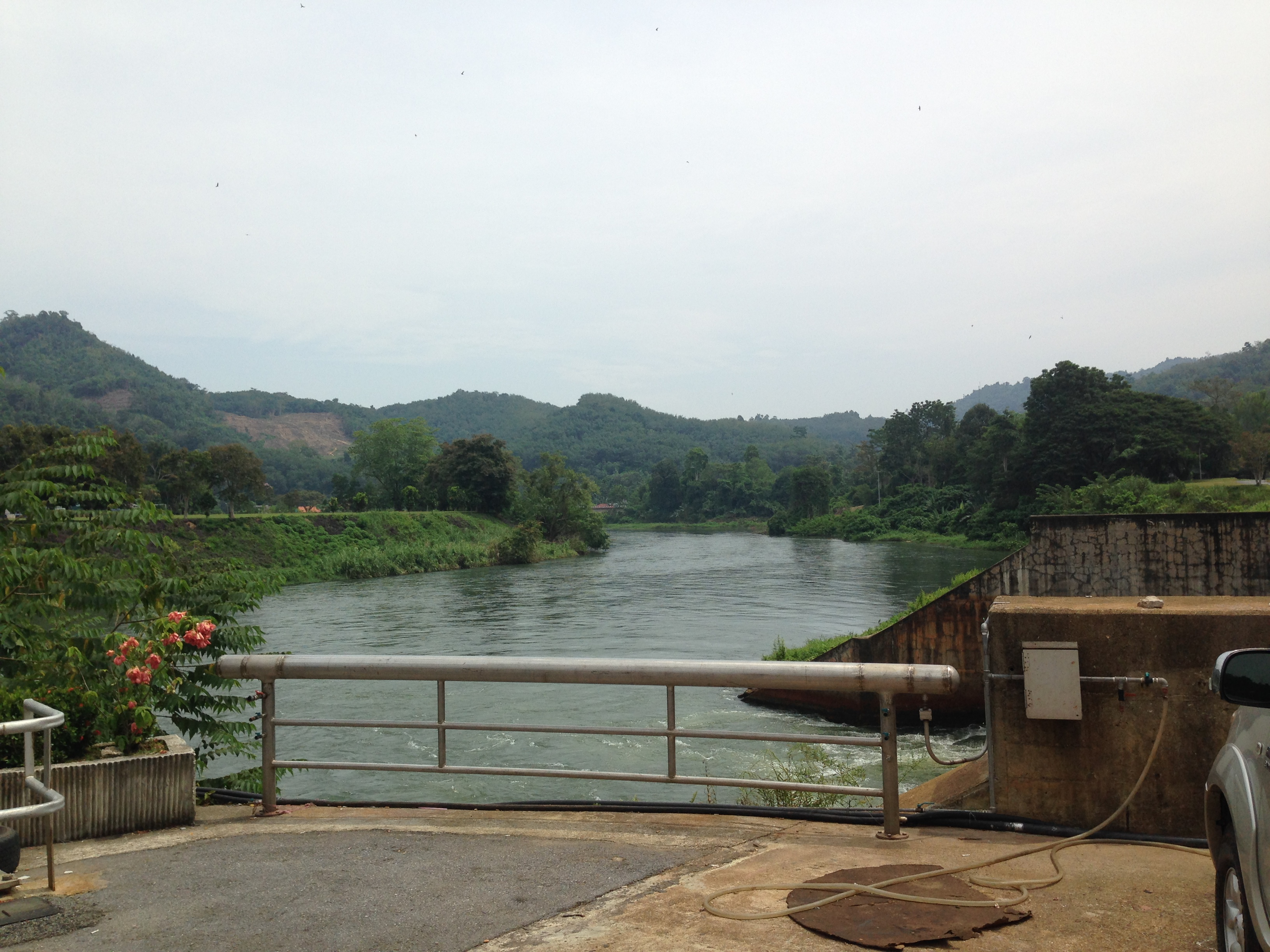
- Bang Lang Dam

- Park location in Thailand
- Location: Thailand
- Nearest city: Yala
- Coordinates: 6.02°N 101.38°E
- Area: 295 km^{2} (114 sq mi)
- Established: 1999
- Governing body: Department of National Parks, Wildlife and Plant Conservation

Bang Lang National Park is a national park in Yala province, Thailand. The park is home to lakes, waterfalls and tropical forests.

== Geography ==
Bang Lang National Park is in the Betong, Bannang Sata and Than To districts of Yala province. It is about 56 km (30 mi) from Yala. The park's area is 295 km^{2} (114 sq mi), with an average elevation of 600 m (2,000 ft). It is a watershed for the Pattani River. The park lies across the Malaysian border from Royal Belum State Park.

== Attractions ==
Bang Lang Dam, 422 m (1,385 ft) long and 85 m (279 ft) high, impounds a reservoir, Than To Lake. Than To Waterfall has nine levels. Other park waterfalls include To Mo waterfall, 100 m (330 ft) high, and La-ong Rung waterfall.

== Flora and fauna ==
Plant species in the park include Johannesteijsmannia altifrons, Intsia palembanica, Dipterocarpus alatus, Hopea odorata, Phanera aureifolia and Mesua nervosa (now Kayea nervosa).

The park hosts animals including elephant, Malayan tapir, serow, gaur, muntjac, sambar deer, macaque, langur, gibbon, Malayan porcupine and the critically endangered banteng. The Sumatran rhinoceros was formerly found here but is now extinct in Thailand. Birds in the park include great hornbill, red-whiskered bulbul and white-rumped shama.
