= Than To subdistrict =

Than To ธารโต
- Tambon
- Interactive map of Than To
- Coordinates: 6°09′27″N 101°11′21″E
- Country: Thailand
- Province: Yala
- Amphoe: Than To

Population (2018)
  - Total: 5,183
- Time zone: UTC+7 (TST)
- Postal code: 95150
- TIS 1099: 950401

Than To (Thai: ธารโต, pronounced [tʰāːn tōː]) is a tambon (subdistrict) of Than To District, in Yala Province, Thailand. In 2018 it had a total population of 5,183 people.

== History ==
The subdistrict was created effective March 30, 1977 by splitting off 5 administrative villages from Mae Wat.

== Administration ==
=== Central administration ===
The tambon is subdivided into 7 administrative villages (muban).

No.	Name	Thai
1.	Ban Than To	บ้านธารโต
2.	Ban Na Kaset	บ้านหน้าเกษตร
3.	Ban Charopae	บ้านจาเราะแป
4.	Ban Si Tha Nam	บ้านศรีท่าน้ำ
5.	Ban Ban Nang Krachae	บ้านบันนังกระแจะ
6.	Ban Mayo	บ้านมายอ
7.	Ban Lang Kaset	บ้านหลังเกษตร

=== Local administration ===
The whole area of the subdistrict is covered by the subdistrict administrative organization (SAO) Than To (องค์การบริหารส่วนตำบลธารโต).
