= Rueso district =

Rueso รือเสาะ
- District
- District location in Narathiwat province
- Coordinates: 6°23′41″N 101°31′6″E
- Country: Thailand
- Province: Narathiwat
- Seat: Rueso Ok

Area
  - Total: 468.324 km^{2} (180.821 sq mi)

Population (2005)
  - Total: 62,893
  - Density: 134.3/km^{2} (348/sq mi)
- Time zone: UTC+7 (ICT)
- Postal code: 96180
- Geocode: 9606

Rueso (Thai: รือเสาะ, pronounced [rɯ̄ː.sɔ̀ʔ]; Malay: Raso) is a district (amphoe) of Narathiwat province, southern Thailand.

== Geography ==
Neighboring districts are (from the northeast clockwise): Bacho, Yi-ngo, Ra-ngae and Si Sakhon of Narathiwat Province; Bannang Sata and Raman of Yala province.

== History ==
Originally the area of the district was tambon Tamma-ngan (ตำมะหงัน) of Mueang Ra-ngae District, the present-day Ra-ngae district. In 1913 it was upgraded to Tamma-ngan Minor District (king amphoe), consisting of six sub-districts (tambons). In 1917 it was renamed "Rueso". On 1 October 1939 the minor district was upgraded to a full district.

== Administration ==
The district is subdivided into nine sub-districts (tambons), which are further subdivided into 71 villages (mubans). The township (thesaban tambon) Rueso covers parts of tambons Rueso and Rueso Ok. There are a further nine tambon administrative organizations (TAO).

No.	Name	Thai name	Villages	Pop.
1.	Rueso	รือเสาะ	10	11,831
2.	Sawo	สาวอ	7	4,214
3.	Riang	เรียง	8	5,567
4.	Samakkhi	สามัคคี	9	5,465
5.	Batong	บาตง	8	5,821
6.	Lalo	ลาโละ	8	8,656
7.	Rueso Ok	รือเสาะออก	5	9,530
8.	Khok Sato	โคกสะตอ	8	5,136
9.	Suwari	สุวารี	8	6,673
