= Chanae district =

Chanae จะแนะ
- District
- District location in Narathiwat province
- Coordinates: 6°5′54″N 101°41′36″E
- Country: Thailand
- Province: Narathiwat
- Seat: Chanae
- Subdistricts: 4
- Mubans: 31
- District established: 15 July 1983

Area
  - Total: 607.2 km^{2} (234.4 sq mi)

Population (2014)
  - Total: 37,034
  - Density: 51.6/km^{2} (134/sq mi)
- Time zone: UTC+7 (ICT)
- Postal code: 96220
- Geocode: 9612

Chanae (Thai: จะแนะ, pronounced [t͡ɕā.nɛ́ʔ]) is a district (amphoe) in the southern part of Narathiwat province, southern Thailand.

== History ==
Tambons Dusong Yo and Chanae were separated from Ra-ngae district to create Chanae minor district (king amphoe) on 15 July 1983. It was upgraded to a full district on 1 January 1988.

Chanae is the Malay name of a native Colocasia species.

== Geography ==
Neighboring districts are (from the west clockwise): Betong, and Than To of Yala province; Sisakhon, Ra-ngae, and Sukhirin of Narathiwat province and the state Perak of Malaysia.

== Demographics ==
In 1963, the Thai government launched the Nikhom Sang Ton Eng Pak Tai ('self-development community in the south') program to move families from Thailand's northeastern and central provinces to the Chanae and Sukhirin Districts of Narathiwat. A total of 5,633 families were relocated to Narathiwat, where each family was rewarded with 18 rai of land.

== Administration ==
=== Central administration ===
Chanae is divided into four sub-districts (tambons), which are further subdivided into 31 administrative villages (mubans).

No.	Name	Thai	Villages	Pop.
1.	Chanae	จะแนะ	10	13,387
2.	Dusongyo	ดุซงญอ	8	9,885
3.	Phadung Mat	ผดุงมาตร	6	6,350
4.	Chang Phueak	ช้างเผือก	7	7,412

=== Local administration ===
There are four sub-district administrative organizations (SAO) in the district:

- Chanae (Thai: องค์การบริหารส่วนตำบลจะแนะ) consisting of sub-district Chanae.
- Dusongyo (Thai: องค์การบริหารส่วนตำบลดุซงญอ) consisting of sub-district Dusongyo.
- Phadung Mat (Thai: องค์การบริหารส่วนตำบลผดุงมาตร) consisting of sub-district Phadung Mat.
- Chang Phueak (Thai: องค์การบริหารส่วนตำบลช้างเผือก) consisting of sub-district Chang Phueak.
