= Amphon Phongsuwan =

Thai civil servant

- อำพล พงศ์สุวรรณ

Governor of Yala Province
- In office 1 October 2023 – 3 April 2025
- Succeeded by: Supot Rodruang Na Nongkhai

Amphon Phongsuwan (Thai: อำพล พงศ์สุวรรณ) was a Thai civil servant, serving as Governor of Yala Province from 2023 to 2025. Amphon died of cancer in office, on 3 April 2025.

== Early life and education ==
Amphon was born in Songkhla Province. He received a Bachelor of Arts in political science from Ramkhamhaeng University, and a master of public administration from Prince of Songkla University.

== Career ==
Amphon organized the response to the 2024 Southern Thai floods in Yala province.

Following his death, he was succeeded as Governor by Supot Rodruang Na Nongkhai on 29 April 2025.
