= Dokchok =

Thai snack

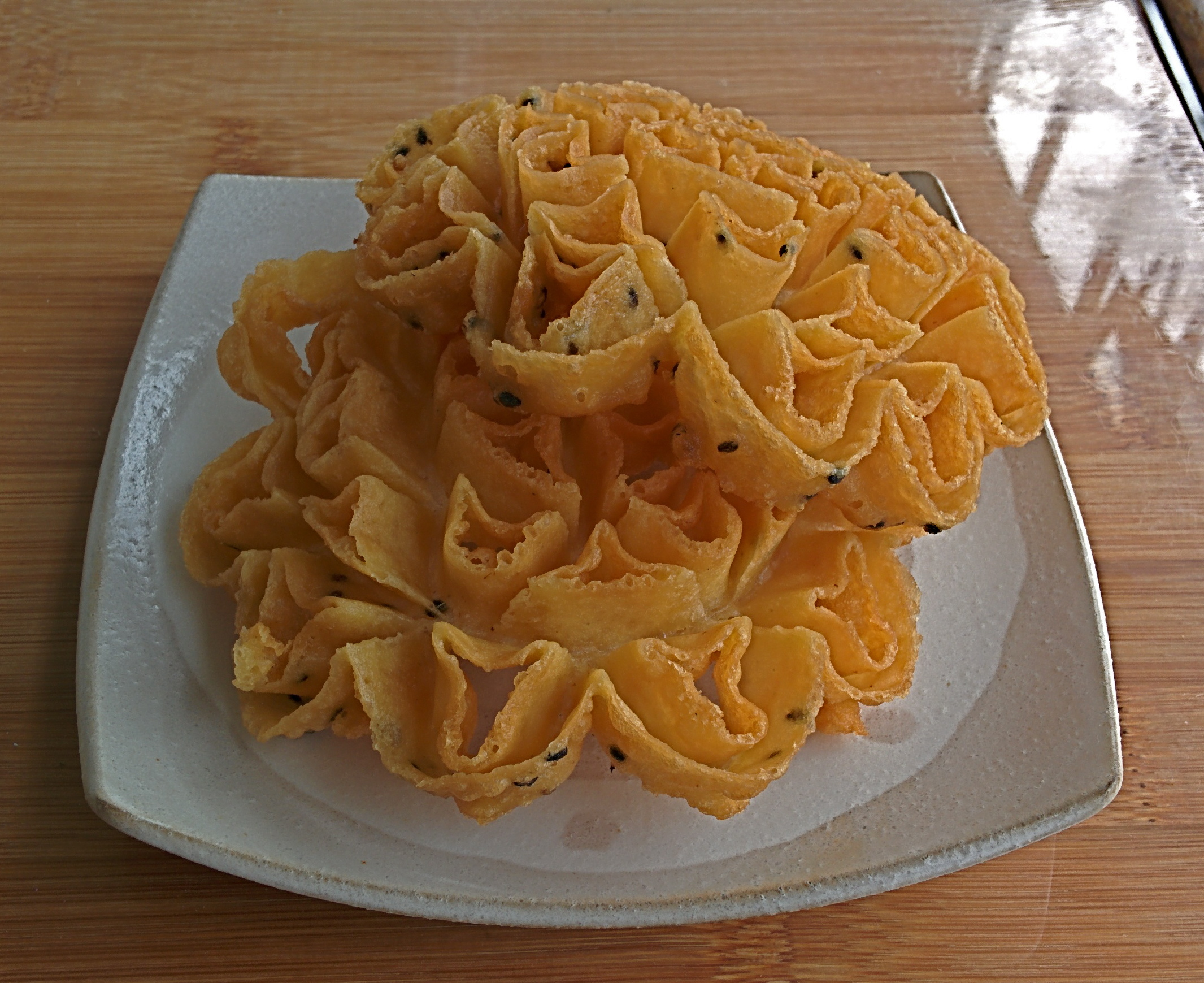
Two pieces of khanom dok chok

Dokchok (Thai: ดอกจอก, pronounced [dɔ̀ːk.tɕɔ̀ːk]) is a type of Thai snack (khanom), more specifically a deep-fried thin wafer made with a batter consisting of tapioca flour, wheat flour, egg, and sesame seeds.

== Names ==
The snack is known by various names in Thai, including khanom dok chok (ขนมดอกจอก, lit. 'water lettuce snack') and khanom dok bua (ขนมดอกบัว, lit. 'lotus snack'), which is also used in Laos. In Thai, dokchok refers to the Pistia flower. This dessert is shaped like a flower; hence the name. The snack is called mont setkya or setkya mont (စကြာမုန့်, lit. 'wheel snack') in neighbouring Myanmar (Burma).

== Traditions ==
Dokchok is a traditional Thai dessert for court ceremonies because in Brahmanism it was a popular dessert with an auspicious name in the ceremony. In other ceremonies, it shows another unique entity of Thai culture that represents the neatness and beauty of the workmanship of craft. Nowadays, dokchok has become a One Tambon One Product (OTOP) in the district of Rangae, Narathiwat. It is often eaten by children and also can be a source of income.
