= Chat Warin Waterfall =

Waterfall in Tambon To Teng, Thailand

Coordinates: 6.102793°N 101.834507°E

Chat Warin Waterfall (Thai: น้ำตกฉัตรวาริน) is a waterfall in Tambon To Teng, near Narathiwat, Thailand. The entrance is a good asphalt road in Budo–Su-ngai Padi National Park. This is a medium-sized waterfall that has water year round and is shady from the many trees in the area.

The most striking plant here is the rare Bangsun Palm that is found in the jungle around 1,800 metres above sea level. It originates from Malaysia. The plant is a low tree but with many branches that are as high as 3 metres. The large diamond-shaped leaves are neatly arranged. The palm is regarded by many as the most beautiful palm in the world and is found only in this forest. The name “Bangsun Palm” was given by Professor Prachit Wamanon, advisor of the royal projects, when he inspected the area. He found the palm grown in a Muslim village. The professor saw that the leaf of the palm is similar to a “Bangsun,” a large umbrella used in processions. The locals call the palm Buke Ipae that means mountain centipede. This is probably because the flower is shaped like a centipede.
