= Budo–Su-ngai Padi National Park =

National park in Thailand

- อุทยานแห่งชาติบูโด-สุไหงปาดี
- IUCN category II (national park)
- Location within Thailand
- Location: Southern Thailand
- Coordinates: 6.467°N 101.630°E
- Area: 341 km^{2} (132 mi^{2})
- Established: 1999
- Website: http://web3.dnp.go.th/parkreserve/asp/style1/default.asp?npid=119&lg=2

Budo–Su-ngai Padi National Park (Thai: อุทยานแห่งชาติบูโด-สุไหงปาดี) is a national park in Narathiwat Province, Thailand. It is part of Sankala Khiri mountain range, the southernmost subrange of the Tenasserim Hills.

== History ==
The area was a haven for guerrillas and few people ventured in to see the natural jungle environment here. However, when the situation improved in 1974, the Royal Forest Department established Pacho Waterfall Park that became Budo–Su-ngai Padi National Park.

== Geography and climate ==
The park has an area of 341 square kilometres (132 mi^{2}) and covers parts of Narathiwat, Yala and Pattani Provinces. The Budo mountain range is part of the Indo-Malayan equatorial tropical rainforest that has high humidity because of the year-round rainfall that it gets.

The park has several waterfalls, such as Phu Wae, Pacho and Pako. The best known and accessible is "Pacho", on a high cliff. The word "pacho" is a Thai adaption/variant of the Malay word pancur meaning "waterfall".

== Flora and fauna ==
The most distinctive plant is the "golden leaves" or "yandao". This plant was first discovered here in 1988. The vine leaves are gold in colour, similar to a hardwood tree of the genus Bauhinia, but considerably larger. Some leaves are even larger than the palm of a hand. The edges of the leaves are curved throughout, like two connected ovals. The leaves have a soft velvet-like texture. Rare animals in the area are rhinoceros, agile gibbons, tapirs, and Sumatran serows. The most important animal is the spectacled langur that inhabits Southeast Asia, from the south of Myanmar and Thailand all the way to Malaysia and some islands. It lives in high mountains and deep jungles in groups of around 30-40. The strongest male is the leader. The langur is usually shy, afraid of humans and not aggressive like monkeys. Apart from the spectacled langur, there are three other types in Thailand; banded langurs, gray langurs, and northern spectacled langurs. All four species of langurs are endangered mammals.

== Location ==
Budo–Su-ngai Padi National Park in overview PARO 6 (Pattani branch)

3) Budo–Su-ngai Padi National Park in overview PARO 6

	National park
1	Ao Manao–Khao Tanyong
2	Bang Lang
3	Budo–Su-ngai Padi
4	Namtok Sai Khao
5	Namtok Si Po

	Wildlife sanctuary
6	Hala-Bala
7	Somdet Phra Thepparat

	Non-hunting area
8	Pa Phru

== See also ==
- List of national parks of Thailand
- DNP - Budo–Su-ngai Padi National Park
- List of Protected Areas Regional Offices of Thailand
