= Mae Wat =

Mae Wat แม่หวาด
- Tambon
- Interactive map of Mae Wat
- Coordinates: 6°02′44″N 101°10′03″E
- Country: Thailand
- Province: Yala
- Amphoe: Than To

Population (2018)
  - Total: 9,321
- Time zone: UTC+7 (TST)
- Postal code: 95130, 95170
- TIS 1099: 950403

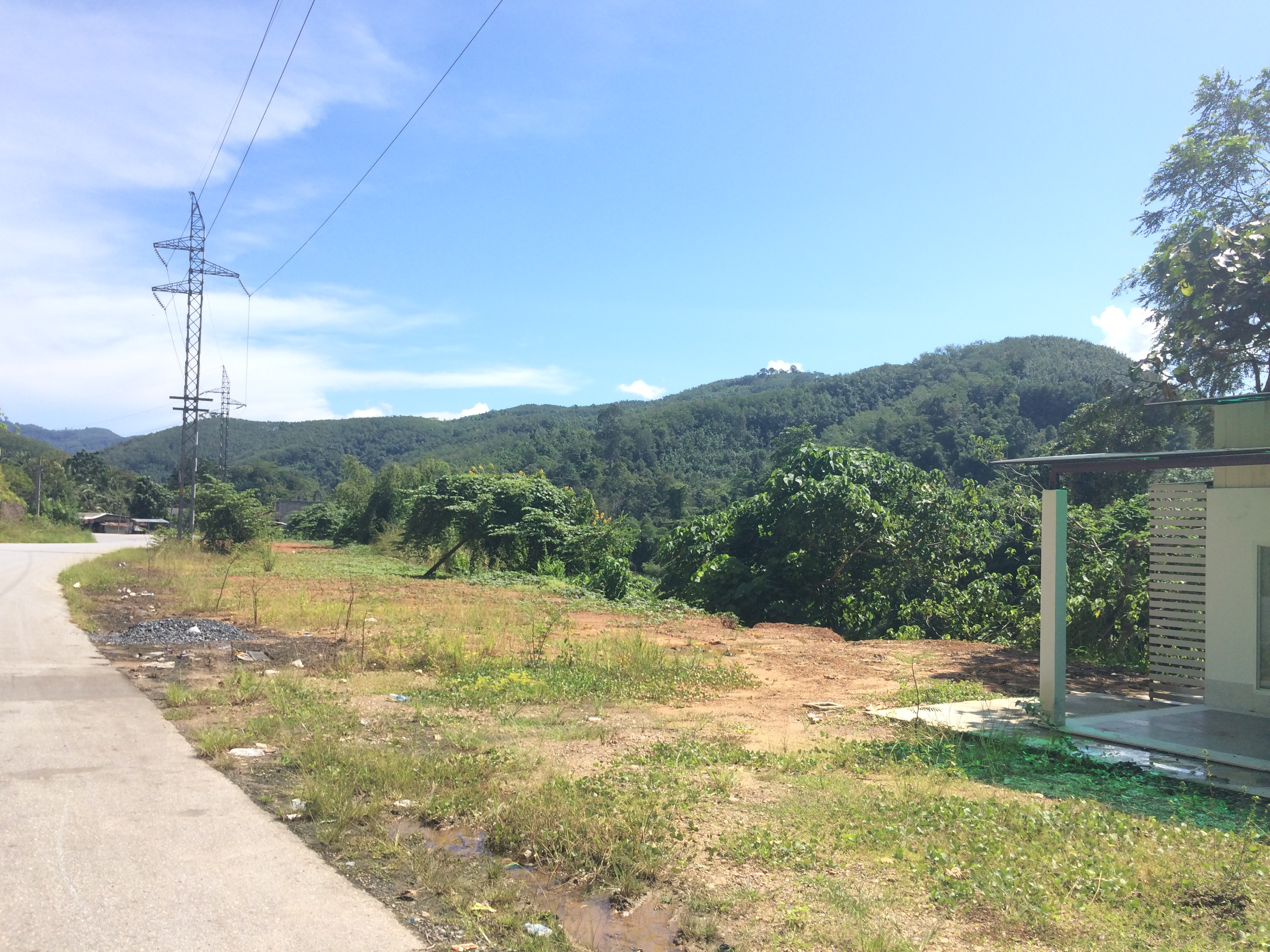

Mae Wat (Thai: แม่หวาด, pronounced [mɛ̂ː wàːt]) is a tambon (subdistrict) of Than To District, in Yala Province, Thailand. In 2018 it had a total population of 9,321 people.

== Administration ==
=== Central administration ===
The tambon is subdivided into 12 administrative villages (muban).

No.	Name	Thai
1.	Ban La Hat	บ้านละหาด
2.	Ban Wang Sai	บ้านวังไทร
3.	Ban Krapong	บ้านกระป๋อง
4.	Ban Pa Deng	บ้านปะเด็ง
5.	Ban Kho Yae	บ้านฆอแย
6.	Ban Santi 2	บ้านสันติ 2
7.	Ban Khok Chang	บ้านคอกช้าง
8.	Ban Pacho Maero	บ้านปาโจแมเราะ
9.	Ban Chulabhorn	บ้านจุฬาภรณ์
10.	Ban Nai Luang	บ้านในหลวง
11.	Ban Ta Phayao	บ้านตาพะเยา
12.	Ban Chumchon Phatthana	บ้านชุมชนพัฒนา

=== Local administration ===
The area of the subdistrict is shared by 2 local governments.

- the subdistrict municipality (Thesaban Tambon) Khok Chang (เทศบาลตำบลคอกช้าง)
- the subdistrict administrative organization (SAO) Mae Wat (องค์การบริหารส่วนตำบลแม่หวาด)
