= Pattani River =

River in Thailand

Coordinates: 6°53′N 101°16′E

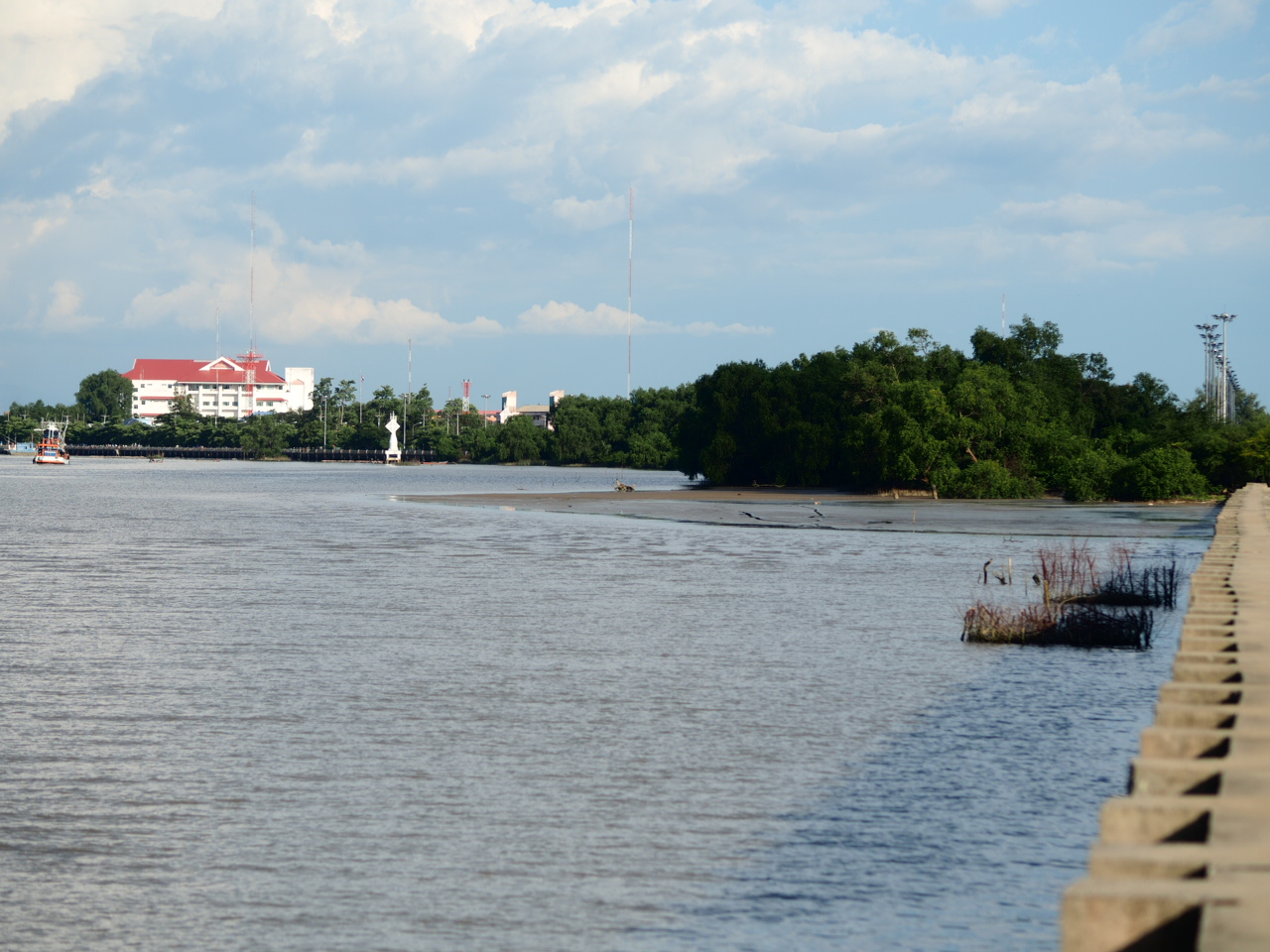
Pattani River

Pattani River (Thai: แม่น้ำปัตตานี, RTGS: Maenam Pattani; Thai pronunciation: [mɛ̂ːnáːm pàt.taː.niː]; Malay: Sungai Patani; Jawi: سوڠاي ڤتنا) is a river in southern Thailand. It originates in Betong district, Yala Province and empties into the Gulf of Thailand at the town of Pattani. Within Yala Province the river forms the Bang Lang Reservoir. The river is 214 kilometres (133 mi) long.

The Bang Lang Dam is built on the river.
