= Si Sakhon district =

Si Sakhon ศรีสาคร
- District
- District location in Narathiwat province
- Coordinates: 6°13′53″N 101°30′0″E
- Country: Thailand
- Province: Narathiwat
- Seat: Sako

Area
  - Total: 500.1 km^{2} (193.1 sq mi)

Population (2005)
  - Total: 31,576
  - Density: 63.1/km^{2} (163/sq mi)
- Time zone: UTC+7 (ICT)
- Postal code: 96210
- Geocode: 9607

Si Sakhon (Thai: ศรีสาคร, pronounced [sǐː sǎː.kʰɔ̄ːn]) is a district (amphoe) of Narathiwat province, southern Thailand.

== History ==
Originally Tambon Sa Ko was a part of the Rueso district, but the development division of the Thai military settled in the area from 1963–1974, thus developing the infrastructure of Tambon Sa Ko. The interior ministry subsequently created Si Sakhon Minor District (king amphoe) consisting of the two tambons, Sako and Tamayung, on 23 September 1974. It was upgraded to a full district on 25 March 1979.

== Etymology ==
The name Si Sakhon refers to the Sai Buri River, which flows through the middle of the district.

== Geography ==
Neighboring districts are (from the north clockwise): Rueso, Ra-ngae, and Chanae of Narathiwat Province; Than To and Bannang Sata of Yala province.

== Administration ==
The district is divided into six sub-districts (tambons), which are further subdivided into 39 villages (mubans). The township (thesaban tambon) Si Sakhon covers parts of tambons Si Sakhon and Sako. There are a further six tambon administrative organizations (TAO).

No.	Name	Thai name	Villages	Pop.
1.	Sako	ซากอ	6	6,992
2.	Tamayung	ตะมะยูง	6	4,734
3.	Si Sakhon	ศรีสาคร	10	8,473
4.	Choeng Khiri	เชิงคีรี	4	4,750
5.	Kalong	กาหลง	4	2,730
6.	Si Banphot	ศรีบรรพต	9	3,897
