= Narathiwat =

Narathiwat นราธิวาส
- Town
- เทศบาลเมืองนราธิวาส
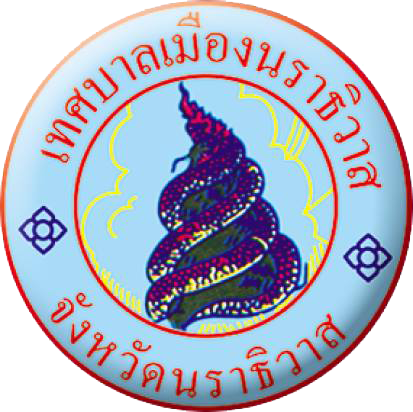
- Seal

- Location in Thailand
- Coordinates: 6°25′N 101°49′E
- Country: Thailand
- Province: Narathiwat
- District: Mueang Narathiwat

Government
  - Mayor: Tanawit Chaiyanupong

Area
  - Total: 7.50 km^{2} (2.90 sq mi)
- Elevation: 9 m (30 ft)

Population (2008)
  - Total: 40,521
  - Density: 5,402/km^{2} (13,990/sq mi)
- Time zone: UTC+7 (ICT)
- Area code: (+66) 73
- Website: naracity.go.th

Narathiwat (Thai: นราธิวาส, pronounced [nā.rāː.tʰí.wâːt]) is a town (thesaban mueang) in southern Thailand and capital of Narathiwat Province. The town is in the Mueang Narathiwat District and was established in 1936. As of 2008, the population was 40,521. It lies 1,141 km south of Bangkok.

== Geography ==
Narathiwat is on the east coast of the Malay Peninsula, by the Gulf of Thailand. The Bang Nara River flows through the town. The immediate vicinity of the town is flat or gently rolling, but there are hills both to the west and south.

== Climate ==
Narathiwat has a tropical rainforest climate (Köppen Af) very close to a tropical monsoon climate (Am). Since Narathiwat is very close to the equator, there is little change in temperature during the year. Rainfall is abundant throughout the year, but there is a drier season from February to April, and rainfall is particularly heavy in November and December.

Climate data for Narathiwat (1991–2020, extremes 1951–present)
Month	Jan	Feb	Mar	Apr	May	Jun	Jul	Aug	Sep	Oct	Nov	Dec	Year
Record high °C (°F)	33.3 (91.9)	35.1 (95.2)	36.6 (97.9)	37.6 (99.7)	39.0 (102.2)	37.2 (99.0)	36.3 (97.3)	38.3 (100.9)	36.0 (96.8)	37.8 (100.0)	35.5 (95.9)	34.7 (94.5)	39.0 (102.2)
Mean daily maximum °C (°F)	29.7 (85.5)	30.5 (86.9)	31.7 (89.1)	32.8 (91.0)	33.5 (92.3)	33.2 (91.8)	32.9 (91.2)	32.9 (91.2)	32.6 (90.7)	31.7 (89.1)	30.1 (86.2)	29.5 (85.1)	31.8 (89.2)
Daily mean °C (°F)	26.2 (79.2)	26.6 (79.9)	27.4 (81.3)	28.3 (82.9)	28.4 (83.1)	28.0 (82.4)	27.7 (81.9)	27.6 (81.7)	27.3 (81.1)	27.0 (80.6)	26.3 (79.3)	26.1 (79.0)	27.2 (81.0)
Mean daily minimum °C (°F)	22.8 (73.0)	22.8 (73.0)	23.3 (73.9)	24.0 (75.2)	24.2 (75.6)	23.9 (75.0)	23.6 (74.5)	23.5 (74.3)	23.4 (74.1)	23.5 (74.3)	23.3 (73.9)	23.1 (73.6)	23.5 (74.2)
Record low °C (°F)	17.1 (62.8)	17.5 (63.5)	18.8 (65.8)	20.2 (68.4)	21.7 (71.1)	20.3 (68.5)	20.5 (68.9)	21.0 (69.8)	21.0 (69.8)	21.5 (70.7)	18.7 (65.7)	19.0 (66.2)	17.1 (62.8)
Average precipitation mm (inches)	193.1 (7.60)	65.0 (2.56)	130.3 (5.13)	89.2 (3.51)	138.2 (5.44)	147.2 (5.80)	124.4 (4.90)	181.5 (7.15)	194.6 (7.66)	272.7 (10.74)	590.2 (23.24)	647.2 (25.48)	2,773.6 (109.20)
Average precipitation days (≥ 1.0 mm)	10.6	4.8	6.5	6.1	9.5	10	9.5	11.5	13.1	15.4	20.4	18.8	136.2
Average relative humidity (%)	82.2	80.4	80.3	79.3	79.6	80.1	79.8	79.8	80.7	82.7	86.2	84.9	81.3
Mean monthly sunshine hours	145.7	166.7	186.0	183.0	151.9	147.0	151.9	151.9	108.0	111.6	105.0	108.5	1,717.2
Mean daily sunshine hours	4.7	5.9	6.0	6.1	4.9	4.9	4.9	4.9	3.6	3.6	3.5	3.5	4.7
Source 1: World Meteorological Organization
Source 2: Office of Water Management and Hydrology, Royal Irrigation Department (sun 1981–2010)(extremes)

== Transportation ==
Route 42, to the north, connects the town to Pattani and then to the Phet Kasem Road (Route 4), which connects to Bangkok. Routes 4055 and 4056 lead south-west, in succession, to the Malaysia–Thailand border at Su-ngai Kolok, while Route 4084 leads south to Tak Bai and then east via Route 4057 to Su-ngai Kolok.

The town is served by Narathiwat Airport, 13 kilometres (8.1 mi) to the north.

== See also ==
- Chat Warin Waterfall
