= Betong Airport =

Airport in southern Thailand

Betong International Airport ท่าอากาศยานเบตง
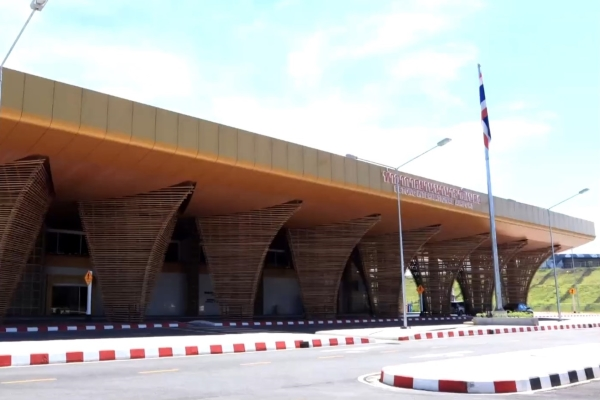
- IATA: BTZ; ICAO: VTSY

Summary
- Airport type: Public
- Owner/Operator: Department of Airports
- Serves: Betong
- Location: Yarom, Betong, Yala, Thailand
- Opened: 14 March 2022; 4 years ago
- Elevation AMSL: 233 m / 765 ft
- Coordinates: 5°47′10.637″N 101°08′51.082″E
- Website: minisite.airports.go.th/betong
- Interactive map of Betong International Airport

Runways
Direction	Length		Surface
Direction	m	ft	Surface
07/25	1,800	5,906	Concrete

Betong International Airport (IATA: BTZ, ICAO: VTSY) is in Yarom subdistrict, Betong district, Yala province in southern Thailand. The airport is 12 km (7.5 mi) east of Betong, 85 km (53 mi) southeast from Yala city and 20 km (12 mi) via the Malaysian border. The airport covers an area of 1.47 million sq.m. (15,800,000 sq.ft.).

== History ==
=== Construction ===
In 2015, the Department of Airports gave a proposal to the Government of Thailand for an airport in Yala province. The airport would help to boost tourism, revenue, employment and spur the overall socio-economic development of the region. It was predicted to generate more than three billion baht for the district's economy. The government approved the proposal in 2016 and started construction in December 2017. The airport was expected to be completed by mid-2021, but the COVID-19 pandemic caused a lack of labour and restrictions, resulted in a delay of another year. The completion date was pushed to 2022. The airport was completed in January 2022 and began operations from March 2022.

=== Inauguration and operations ===
Betong Airport received its first passenger operations on 29 January 2022. A chartered flight operated by Nok Air from Bangkok’s Don Mueang International Airport.

In March 2022, Nok Air opened the bookings for the Bangkok-Betong route. The first scheduled flight to the airport was launched on 14 March 2022 and it was attended by the Prime Minister of Thailand, Prayut Chan-o-cha for the airport's inauguration ceremony. However, the future bookings for route was cancelled two days later by the airline, citing the low passenger demand for the destination.

Despite the then-ongoing COVID-19 pandemic, the operations to Betong was relaunched by the carrier on 29 April 2022, following the cooperation between Nok Air, Tourism Authority of Thailand and tour operators on developing travel packages to the area. Additionally, Nok Air also planned to attract Malaysian tourist to use the route due to the accessible location of the airport near the Malaysian border. Direct flights to Betong was conducted in two phases — the first between 29 April to 29 July 2022 and the second phase was continued on 31 July to 28 October 2022. The Bangkok Don Mueang-Betong route was operated by a 86-seater Bombardier Dash 8 Q400 on Mondays, Wednesdays and Fridays.

Following the conclusion of the second phase on 28 October, Nok Air decided not to renew the route due to the high operational cost to Betong. Despite achieving about 90% passenger load factor, the airline was encountered with financial obstacle and losses for the route, especially due to the high aviation fuel expenditure.

On 27 June 2025, EZY Airlines launched their inaugural flights from Hat Yai International Airport to Betong Airport on a Cessna Grand Caravan, making it the first scheduled flight in three years.

=== Future ===
A proposal has been bought to the Ministry of Transport to introduce a flight between Hat Yai International Airport to Betong after the end of the Bangkok-Betong flights on 28 October. The Tourism Association in Betong has been in discussion with Bangkok Airways on the strong possibility to link the two areas in southern Thailand.

== Airlines and destinations ==
=== Passenger ===
Airlines	Destinations
EZY Airlines	Hat Yai

== Features ==
=== Infrastructure ===
The airport is built at a cost of 1.9 billion baht and covers an area of 1.47 million sq. m. It consists of a 7,000 sq.m. passenger terminal, capable of handling over 300 passengers at peak hours and over 300,000 passengers per year, an apron area for parking of four ATR-72 and Airbus A319 type aircraft, an air traffic control (ATC) tower, a 1,800 m runway along with a taxiway connecting the western side of it among other ancillary facilities. The runway will be expanded to 2,100 m for handling Airbus A320 and Boeing 737 type aircraft. It is connected with the help of provincial highway 4032, which acts as a bypass for the town. It leads to Highway 410 which leads to Yala and Malaysia. In the future, the airport will be upgraded to handle international traffic, which will increase the airport's capacity to serve over one million passengers per year.

=== Architecture ===
As the town's name derived from the Malay word Betong — a species of Giant Bamboo (Dendrocalamus asper), also known as Phai Tong in the Thai language. Strong elements of the flora is being extensively incorporated in the airport, being inspired from the name and the local bamboo forest. The airport sourced natural bamboos for both its exterior and interior architecture. The yellow colour scheme is being designed to replicate the matured bamboo foliage.

The mountainous landscape of Betong is also represented in its architecture, with marble floorings symbolizing the native terrain surrounding the town.

== See also ==
- List of airports in Thailand
