= 2019 Yala attack =

Terrorist incident in Thailand

- Location: Fortress Village Security Pack, Lam Phaya Sub-district Mueang Yala District, Yala Province, Thailand
- Date: 5 November 2019; 22:20 (UTC+07:00)
- Target: Village volunteers
- Attack type: Mass shooting, grenade attack
- Weapons: BRN side: • AK • M16 rifle • Shotgun • Grenade • M79 grenade launcher Village defense volunteers side: • M16 rifle • Shotgun • Handgun
- Deaths: 15
- Injuries: 7 (including two perpetrators)
- Perpetrator: BRN side
- Defender: Village defense volunteers

On 6 November 2019, fifteen people were killed and another five injured in an attack on a security checkpoint in Yala Province, Thailand. Among the dead and injured were a police officer and many village defense volunteers. A total of ten men and five women died in the attack, making it the largest loss of village defense forces in a single attack during the South Thailand insurgency.

The attack resulted in the looting of eight guns that the victims possessed, including one M16, two shotguns, and five pistols. To disrupt the efforts of the officers tracking them, the attackers had sprinkled tire spikes, cut down trees, and burned tires on roads during the attack.
