= Bang Lang Reservoir =

- Location within Thailand
- Location: Yala Province
- Coordinates: 6°9′20″N 101°16′25″E
- Type: Reservoir
- Primary inflows: Pattani River
- Primary outflows: Pattani River
- Basin countries: Thailand
- Built: 1981
- Max. width: 1.92 miles (3.09 km)
- Water volume: 1,420 million cubic metres (1,150,000 acre⋅ft)
- Islands: numerous islands and islets

Bang Lang Reservoir (Thai: อ่างเก็บน้ำบางลาง) is a reservoir in Bannang Sata District, Yala Province, southern Thailand. The reservoir is on the Pattani River.

The reservoir's dam, Bang Lang Dam, is 85 metres high with a crest of 422 metres long, and the reservoir has a capacity of 1,420 million cubic metres. It is used for irrigation and flood control as well as to produce 72 MW of electricity.

== History ==
Construction of the dam was approved on 3 April 1973. Construction started in July 1976. In June 1981 the dam was completed. It was officially inaugurated on 27 September 1981 by Princess Maha Chakri Sirindhorn.

The reservoir submerged the village of Ban Toh. In 2016, declining water levels caused the village remains to resurface.
