= Supot Rodruang Na Nongkhai =

Thai politician

- สุพจน์ รอดเรือง ณ หนองคาย

Governor of Yala Province
- Incumbent
- Assumed office 29 April 2025
- Preceded by: Amphon Phongsuwan

Governor of Phang Nga Province
- In office 2023 – 8 October 2024

Supot Rodruang Na Nongkhai (Thai: สุพจน์ รอดเรือง ณ หนองคาย, RTGS: Suphot Rotrueang Na Nongkhai) is a Thai civil servant, serving as Governor of Yala Province since 2025.

Supot previously served as Governor of Phuket Province and Phang Nga Province.

== Career ==
In 2019, Supot was accused of bribery while serving as deputy governor of Phuket.

Following the death of Governor of Yala Province Amphon Phongsuwan on 3 April 2025, Supot was appointed governor by the Cabinet of Thailand on 29 April 2025.
