= Bang Lang Dam =

Dam in Bannang Sata, Yala, Thailand

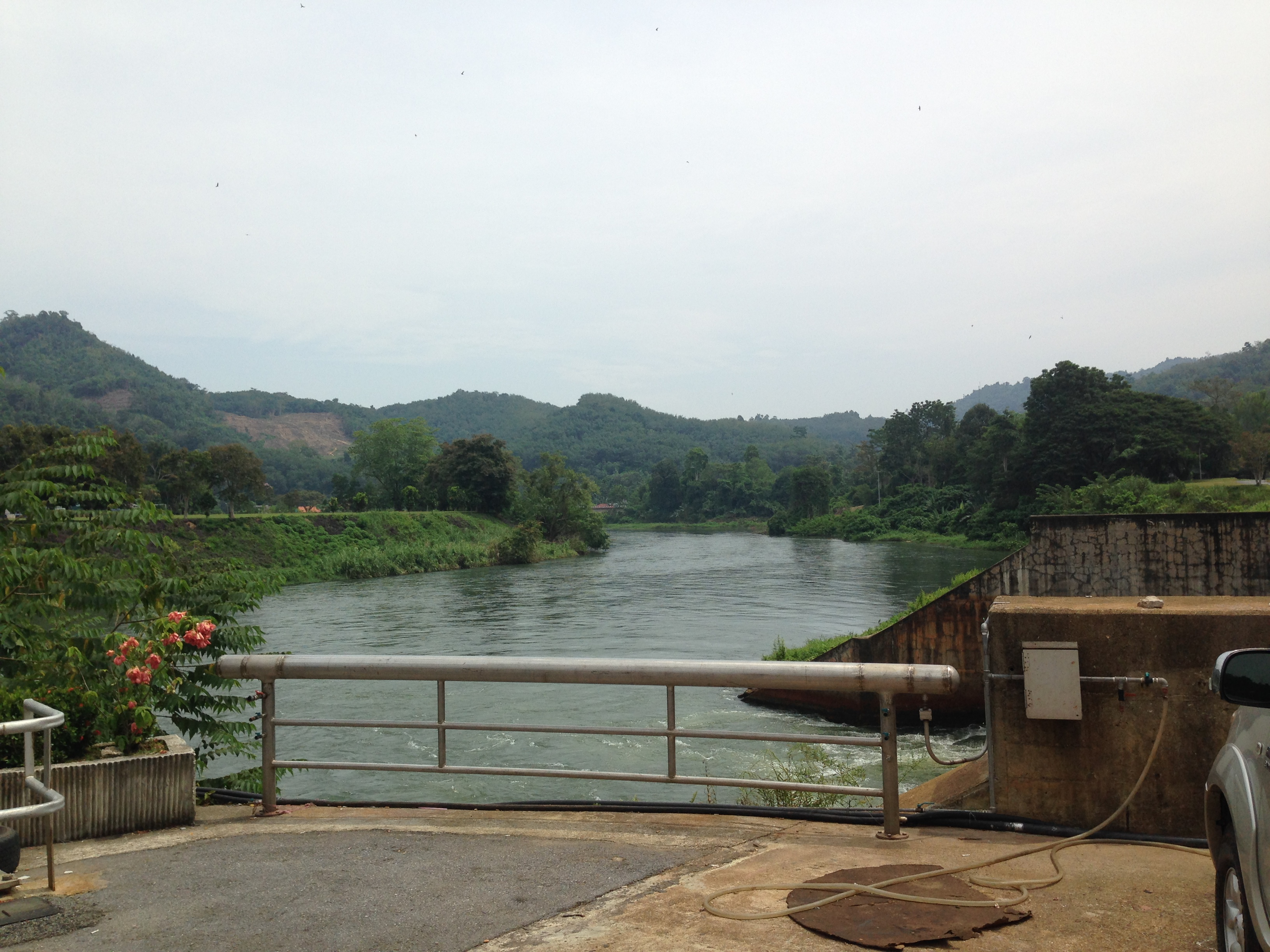
- Dam looking to Pattani River

- Dam location in Thailand
- Interactive map of Bang Lang Dam
- Country: Thailand
- Location: Bannang Sata, Yala
- Coordinates: 6°9′23″N 101°16′25″E
- Purpose: Multi-purpose
- Status: Operational
- Construction began: July 1976
- Opening date: 27 September 1981
- Construction cost: US$133.13 million
- Owner: Electricity Generating Authority of Thailand

Dam and spillways
- Type of dam: Earth fill dam
- Impounds: Pattani River
- Height (foundation): 85 m (279 ft)
- Length: 430 m (1,410 ft)
- Elevation at crest: 120 m (390 ft)
- Width (crest): 10 m (33 ft)

Reservoir
- Creates: Bang Lang Reservoir
- Total capacity: 1,420,000,000 m^{3} (5.0×10^{10} ft^{3})
- Catchment area: 2,080 km^{2} (800 mi^{2})

Power Station
- Operator: Electricity Generating Authority of Thailand
- Turbines: 3 x 24 MW Francis-type
- Installed capacity: 72 MW
- Annual generation: 200 GWh

The Bang Lang Dam (Thai: เขื่อนบางลาง, RTGS: Khuean Bang Lang, pronounced [kʰɯ̀a̯n bāːŋ lāːŋ]), also known as the Pattani Dam (เขื่อนปัตตานี, RTGS: Khuean Pattani, pronounced [kʰɯ̀a̯n pàt.tāː.nīː]), is a multi-purpose hydroelectric dam in the Bannang Sata District of Yala Province, Thailand. It was the first multi-purpose dam developed in Thailand's southern region. The dam impounds the Pattani River, creating the Bang Lang Reservoir. The dam and its accompanying power plant were developed as part of the Pattani Project.

== Description ==
Bang Lang Dam is an earth core rockfill dam. It is 430 m (1,410 ft) long and 85 m (279 ft) high. Its reservoir has a maximum storage capacity of 1,420,000,000 m^{3} (5.0×10^{10} ft^{3}) with a catchment area of 2,080 km^{2} (800 mi^{2}).

The dam is considered multi-purpose supporting electricity generation, irrigation, flood control, fisheries and recreation activities.

== Power plant ==
The dam's power plant has three hydroelectric Francis turbine-generating units, each with an installed capacity of 24 MW. A nearby mini hydroelectric project at Ban Santi has a 1.275 MW generating unit and is also part of the Pattani Project. The combined annual power generation is 200 GWh.
