= Ra-ngae district =

Ra-ngae ระแงะ
- District
- District location in Narathiwat province
- Coordinates: 6°17′47″N 101°43′42″E
- Country: Thailand
- Province: Narathiwat
- Seat: Tanyong Mat

Area
  - Total: 435.6 km^{2} (168.2 sq mi)

Population (2005)
  - Total: 144,259
  - Density: 331.2/km^{2} (858/sq mi)
- Time zone: UTC+7 (ICT)
- Postal code: 96130
- Geocode: 9605

Ra-ngae (Thai: ระแงะ, pronounced [rā.ŋɛ́ʔ]; Pattani Malay: ลือแฆะห์ [Legeh, لݢيه]) is a district (amphoe) in Narathiwat province, southern Thailand.

== History ==
Mueang Ra-ngae was divided from Pattani in the reign of King Rama I by Vice-King Boworn Maha Surasinghanat. The governor position was Phraya Ra-ngae. The old city office was near Kelantan state. When the first governor escaped from the city, the next governor moved the office to Tambon Tanyong Mat. In 1906 when King Chulalongkorn established Monthon Pattani, Mueang Ra-ngae was one of the satellite cities of the monthon.

In late-2019, three young woodcutters were murdered by Thai troops in Bo-ngo Subdistrict. The government claimed initially that the killings occurred in a clash between paramilitary Rangers and terrorists. Later, the Human Rights Protection Committee, appointed by the Fourth Army Area Commander, concluded that soldiers mistook the dead men for terrorists and killed them as they were running away. Families of the deceased pointed out that the young men possessed nothing but wood cutting tools. Images of the dead men on social media showed that each of them was shot in the head—two of them sitting crossed-leg on the ground, leaning forward. The Commander of the Fourth Army Area issued an apology, a compensation payment of 500,000 baht for each death, and transferred the responsible commander of the 45th Ranger Forces Regiment elsewhere.

== Geography ==
Neighboring districts are (from the north clockwise): Yi-ngo, Mueang Narathiwat, Cho-airong, Su-ngai Padi, Sukhirin, Chanae, Si Sakhon, and Rueso.

Namtok Sipo National Park is in Ra-ngae.

== Administration ==
The district is divided into seven sub-districts (tambons), which are further subdivided into 60 villages (mubans). Tanyong Mat and Maruebo Tok both have township (thesaban tambon) status and cover parts of the tambons with the same names.

No.	Name	Thai name	Malay name	Villages	Pop.
1.	Tanyong Mat	ตันหยงมัส	Tanjung Mas (تنجوڠ مس)	12	18,726
2.	Tanyong Limo	ตันหยงลิมอ	Tanjung Lima (تنجوڠ ليم)	8	7,657
6.	Bo-ngo	บองอ	Bongor (بوڠور)	10	14,009
7.	Kalisa	กาลิซา	Kalisa (کليسا)	6	12,765
8.	Ba-ngo Sato	บาโงสะโต	Banggol Setul (بڠݢول ستول)	8	9,549
9.	Chaloem	เฉลิม		7	9,924
10.	Maruebo Tok	มะรือโบตก	Merebol Barat (مربول بارت)	9	11,629

Missing numbers are the tambon which now form Cho-airong District.
