= Bannang Sata district =

Bannang Sata บันนังสตา
- District
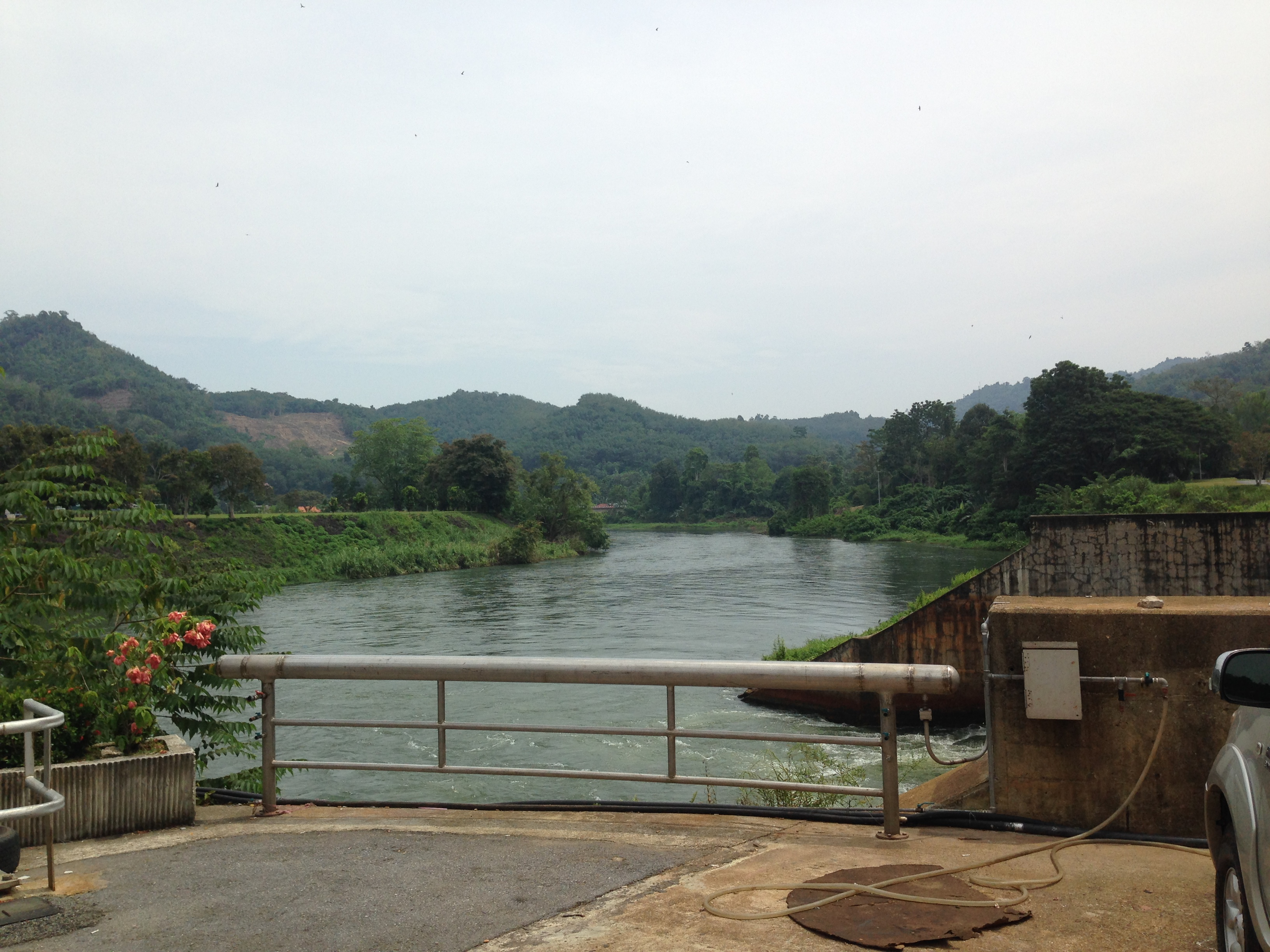
- Bang Lang Dam

- District location in Yala province
- Coordinates: 6°16′0″N 101°15′52″E
- Country: Thailand
- Province: Yala
- Seat: Bannang Sata

Area
  - Total: 629.0 km^{2} (242.9 sq mi)

Population (2014)
  - Total: 58,616
  - Density: 84.5/km^{2} (219/sq mi)
- Time zone: UTC+7 (ICT)
- Postal code: 95130
- Geocode: 9503

Bannang Sata (Thai: บันนังสตา, pronounced [bān.nāŋ sā.tāː]; Malay: Bendang Setar; Jawi: بنداڠ ستر ) is a district (amphoe) in the southern part of Yala province, southern Thailand. It is the site of the Bang Lang Dam and reservoir.

== History ==
The name Bannang Sata is the Thai iteration of Bendang Setar (Jawi: بنداڠ ستار), its original Malay name. Bendang means 'wet paddy field', while setar is a 'tree with small, sour fruit' (Bouea macrophylla).

In the past the district was named Ba Cho (บาเจาะ) controlled by Mueang Raman, created in 1907. The name Bacho is a Thai iteration of 'Bachok (Jawi: باچوق), its original Malay name. Later, the district office was moved to a new location and renamed Bannang Sata.

== Geography ==
Neighboring districts are (from the northwest clockwise): Yaha, Krong Pinang, and Raman of Yala Province; Rueso and Si Sakhon of Narathiwat province; Than To of Yala Province; and Kedah state of Malaysia.

== Administration ==
=== Central administration ===
Bannang Sata is divided into six sub-districts (tambons), which are further subdivided into 50 administrative villages (mubans).

No.	Name	Thai	Villages	Pop.
1.	Bannang Sata	บันนังสตา	11	19,445
2.	Bacho	บาเจาะ	5	8,318
3.	Tano Pute	ตาเนาะปูเต๊ะ	10	9,741
4.	Tham Thalu	ถ้ำทะลุ	5	2,998
5.	Taling Chan	ตลิ่งชัน	13	13,879
6.	Khuean Bang Lang	เขื่อนบางลาง	6	4,235

=== Local administration ===
There are two sub-district municipalities (thesaban tambons) in the district:

- Bannang Sata (Thai: เทศบาลตำบลบันนังสตา) consisting of parts of sub-district Bannang Sata.
- Khuean Bang Lang (Thai: เทศบาลตำบลเขื่อนบางลาง) consisting of sub-district Khuean Bang Lang.

There are five sub-district administrative organizations (SAO) in the district:

- Bannang Sata (Thai: องค์การบริหารส่วนตำบลบันนังสตา), (Malay: Bendang Setar) consisting of parts of sub-district Bannang Sata.
- Bacho (Thai: องค์การบริหารส่วนตำบลบาเจาะ), (Malay: Bachok) consisting of sub-district Bacho.
- Tano Pute (Thai: องค์การบริหารส่วนตำบลตาเนาะปูเต๊ะ), (Malay: Tanah Putih) consisting of sub-district Tano Pute.
- Tham Thalu (Thai: องค์การบริหารส่วนตำบลถ้ำทะลุ) consisting of sub-district Tham Thalu.
- Taling Chan (Thai: องค์การบริหารส่วนตำบลตลิ่งชัน) consisting of sub-district Taling Chan.
