= Namtok Sai Khao National Park =

National park in Thailand

- IUCN category II (national park)
- Park location in Thailand
- Location: Thailand
- Nearest city: Pattani
- Coordinates: 6.66°N 101.1°E
- Area: 70 km^{2} (27 sq mi)
- Established: 2008
- Governing body: Department of National Parks, Wildlife and Plant Conservation

Namtok Sai Khao National Park is a national park in Pattani, Songkhla and Yala provinces in Thailand. The park is home to waterfalls and tropical forests.

== Geography ==
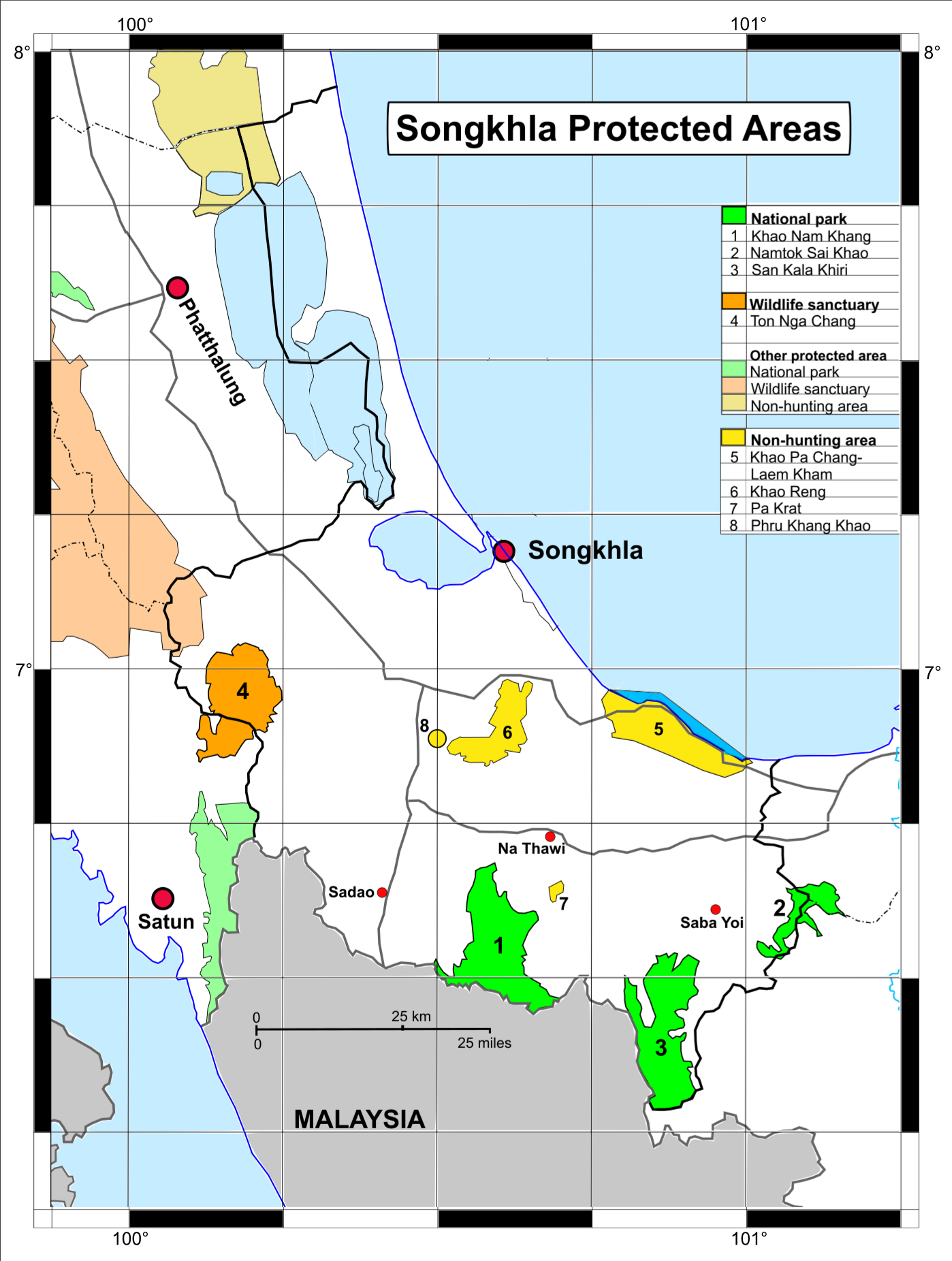
Protected areas of Songkhla province

Namtok Sai Khao National Park is about 40 km (25 mi) from Pattani. The park's area is 70 km^{2} (27 sq mi).

The park is in the Sankalakhiri Range and the highest point is Khao Nang Chan peak.

== Attractions ==
The park's highest waterfall is the park namesake Sai Khao waterfall at 40 m (130 ft) high, with a resultant stream 700 m (2,300 ft) long. Other park waterfalls include Aran Warin, a six-tier waterfall with a top tier 30 m (100 ft) high.

== Flora and fauna ==
The park features tropical rainforest with orchids and ferns. The park hosts animals including muntjac and chevrotain. Birds in the park include little spiderhunter, banded woodpecker, chestnut-naped forktail and golden-whiskered barbet.
