= Than To district =

Than To ธารโต
- District
- District location in Yala province
- Coordinates: 6°10′2″N 101°10′48″E
- Country: Thailand
- Province: Yala
- Seat: Than To
- District established: 1975

Area
  - Total: 648.0 km^{2} (250.2 sq mi)

Population (2019)
  - Total: 25,134
  - Density: 32.9/km^{2} (85/sq mi)
- Time zone: UTC+7 (ICT)
- Postal code: 95150
- Geocode: 9504

Than To (Thai: ธารโต, pronounced [tʰāːn tōː]) is a district (amphoe) in southern Yala province, Thailand.

== History ==
The tambon Mae Wat was separated from Bannang Sata district on 9 June 1975 and formed the new minor district (king amphoe) Than To. It was upgraded to a full district on 13 July 1981.

The area had been the site of the Than To Prison of the Corrections Department. The prison was established in 1935 for political prisoners. It was closed in 1957. Later the government converted the area to Than To Estate.

== Geography ==
Neighboring districts are (from the north clockwise): Bannang Sata of Yala Province; Si Sakhon of Narathiwat province; Betong of Yala Province; and Kedah state of Malaysia.

== Administration ==
=== Central administration ===
The district Than To is subdivided into 4 subdistricts (Tambon), which are further subdivided into 37 administrative villages (Muban).

No.	Name	Thai	Villages	Pop.
1.	Than To	ธารโต	7	5,183
2.	Ban Rae	บ้านแหร	11	7,676
3.	Mae Wat	แม่หวาด	12	9,321
4.	Khiri Khet	คีรีเขต	7	2,954

=== Local administration ===
There is one subdistrict municipality (Thesaban Tambon) in the district:

- Khok Chang (Thai: เทศบาลตำบลคอกช้าง) consisting of parts of the subdistrict Mae Wat.

There are 4 subdistrict administrative organizations (SAO) in the district:

- Than To (Thai: องค์การบริหารส่วนตำบลธารโต) consisting of the complete subdistrict Than To.
- Ban Rae (Thai: องค์การบริหารส่วนตำบลบ้านแหร) consisting of the complete subdistrict Ban Rae.
- Mae Wat (Thai: องค์การบริหารส่วนตำบลแม่หวาด) consisting of parts of the subdistrict Mae Wat.
- Khiri Khet (Thai: องค์การบริหารส่วนตำบลคีรีเขต) consisting of the complete subdistrict Khiri Khet.
