= Betong district =

Betong เบตง
- District
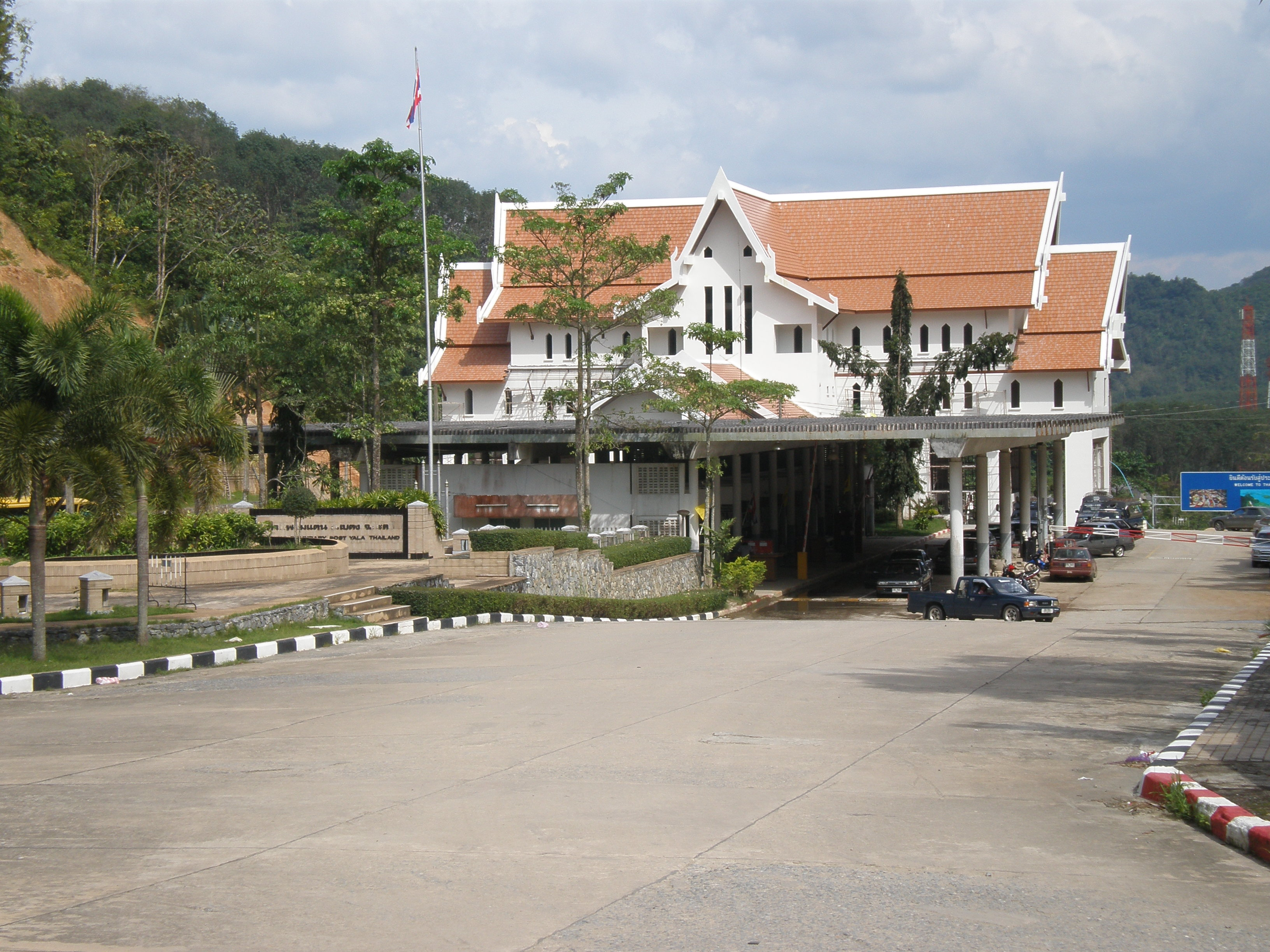
- Thai border checkpoint, Betong District.

- District location in Yala province
- Coordinates: 5°46′25″N 101°3′38″E
- Country: Thailand
- Province: Yala
- Seat: Betong
- Tambon: 5
- Muban: 32

Area
  - Total: 1,328.0 km^{2} (512.7 sq mi)

Population (2017)
  - Total: 62,523
  - Density: 41.1/km^{2} (106/sq mi)
- Time zone: UTC+7 (ICT)
- Postal code: 95110
- Geocode: 9502

Betong (Thai: เบตง, pronounced [bēː.tōŋ]; Pattani Malay: บือตง, pronounced [bɯː.tōŋ]; Malay: Betung; Chinese: 勿洞) is the southernmost district (amphoe) of Yala province, southern Thailand.

== Geography ==
Betong is on the Malaysian border. To the north is Than To, to the east is Chanae (Narathiwat province). To the south is the Malaysian state of Perak and to the west is Kedah.

The highest point of the Sankalakhiri Range (Northern Titiwangsa Mountains), 1,533 m (5,030 ft) high Ulu Titi Basah (เขาหลวง), is on the Thai–Malaysian border between Betong District and Hulu Perak District of Perak.

== History ==
In the past, this area was under Mueang Raman, Monthon Pattani. It was upgraded to a district in 1868 with the name Yarom. In 1930 the district name was changed to Betong.

The name Betong is the Thai corruption of Betung, its original Malay name means 'bamboo'.

== Population ==
Religion in Betong (2018)
religion	percent
Islam	52.9%
Buddhism	46.4%
Other	0.7%

In Betong, ethnic Thai Chinese and Thai Malay Muslims both outnumber native Buddhist Thais. At present there are five Chinese organizations.

== Economy ==
Along with highways and roadways, the district is now connected by air with the help of Betong Airport. Currently, no commercial airlines service Betong Airport.

The historically difficult travel to the capital district resulted in Betong being the only district in Thailand with its own vehicle registrar and license plate.

== Administration ==
=== Central administration ===
Betong is divided into five sub-districts (tambons), which are further subdivided into 32 administrative villages (mubans).

No.	Name	Thai	Villages	Pop.
1.	Betong	เบตง	-	26,663
2.	Yarom	ยะรม	8	10,266
3.	Tano Maero	ตาเนาะแมเราะ	9	9,436
4.	Aiyoeweng	อัยเยอร์เวง	11	11,703
5.	Than Nam Thip	ธารน้ำทิพย์	4	4,455

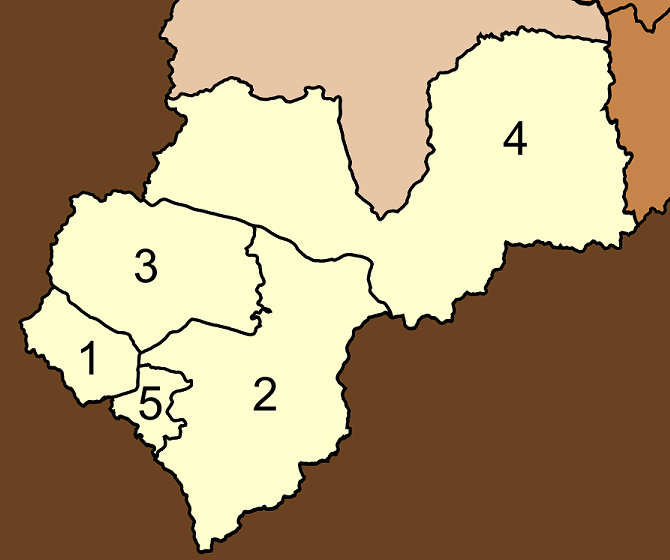
Tambons of Betong district

=== Local administration ===
There is one town (thesaban mueang) in the district:

- Betong (Thai: เทศบาลเมืองเบตง) consisting of sub-district Betong.

There is one sub-district municipality (thesaban tambon) in the district:

- Than Nam Thip (Thai: เทศบาลตำบลธารน้ำทิพย์) consisting of sub-district Than Nam Thip.

There are three sub-district administrative organizations (SAO) in the district:

- Yarom (Thai: องค์การบริหารส่วนตำบลยะรม) consisting of sub-district Yarom.
- Tano Maero (Thai: องค์การบริหารส่วนตำบลตาเนาะแมเราะ) consisting of sub-district Tano Maero.
- Aiyoeweng (Thai: องค์การบริหารส่วนตำบลอัยเยอร์เวง) consisting of sub-district Aiyoeweng.

== Gallery ==
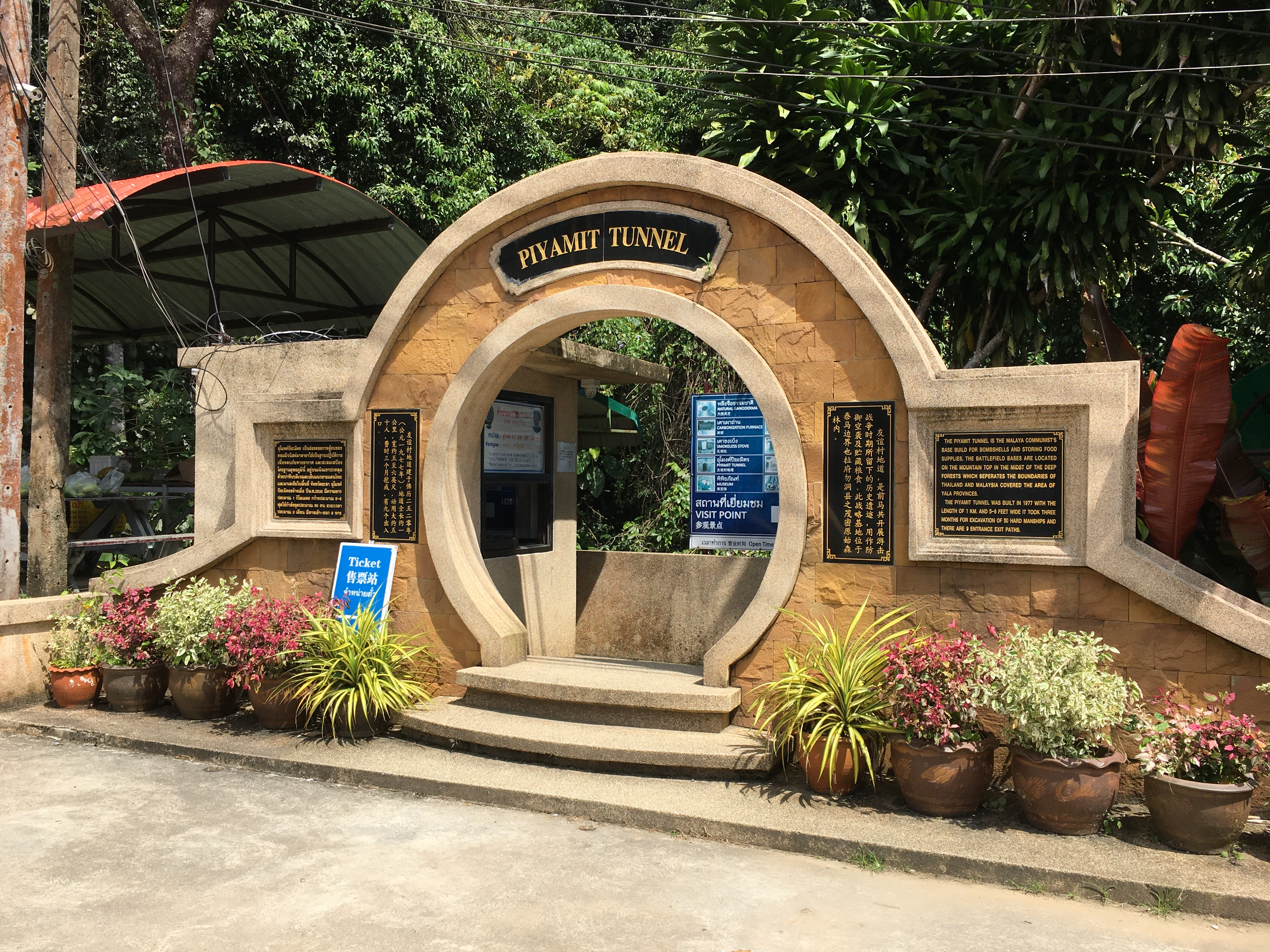
Entrance to the Piyamit Tunnels in Tana Maero subdistrict.

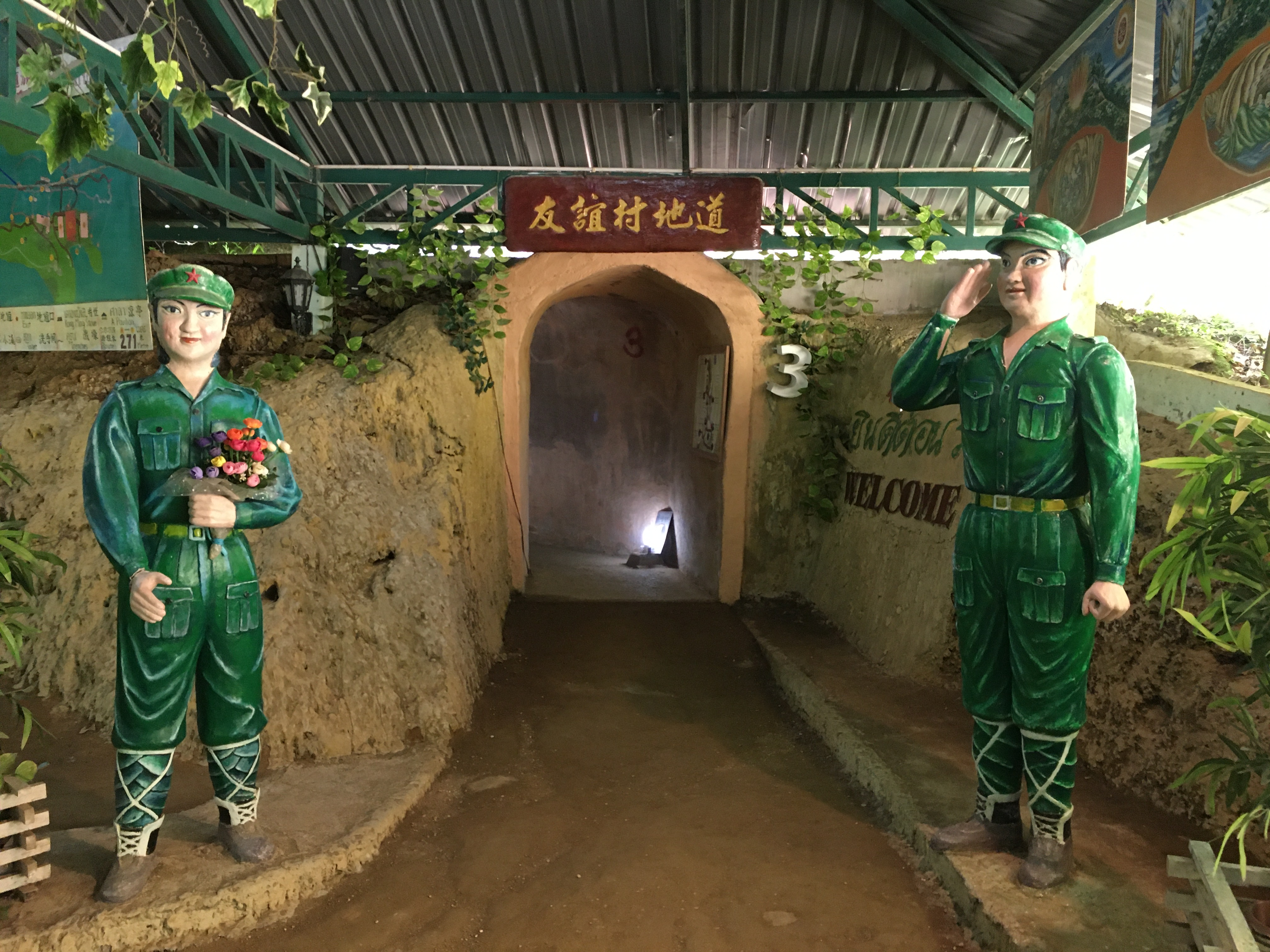
Entrance 3 of the Piyamit Tunnels.

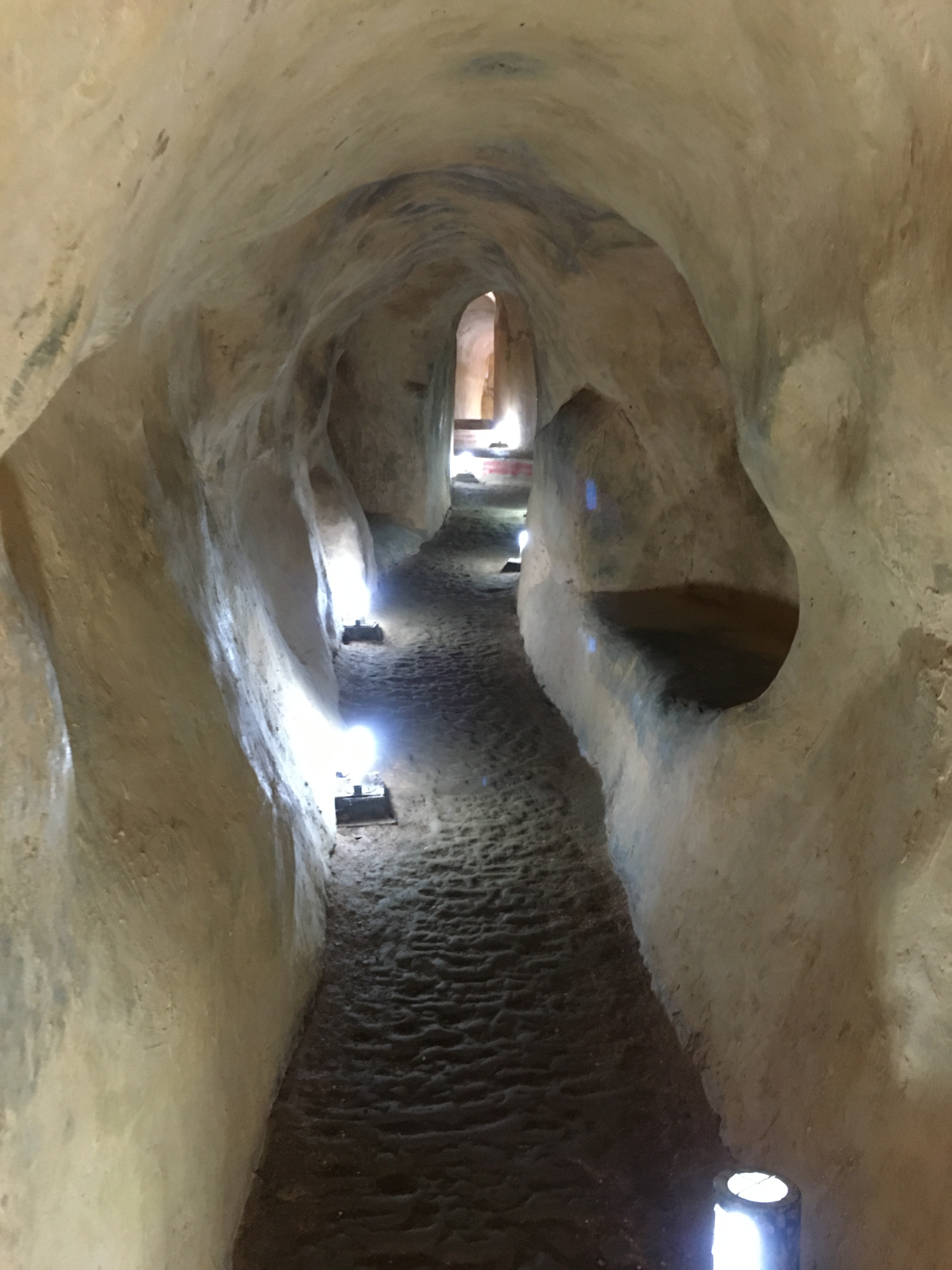
Piyamit Tunnels which were used by Malayan Communist insurgents.

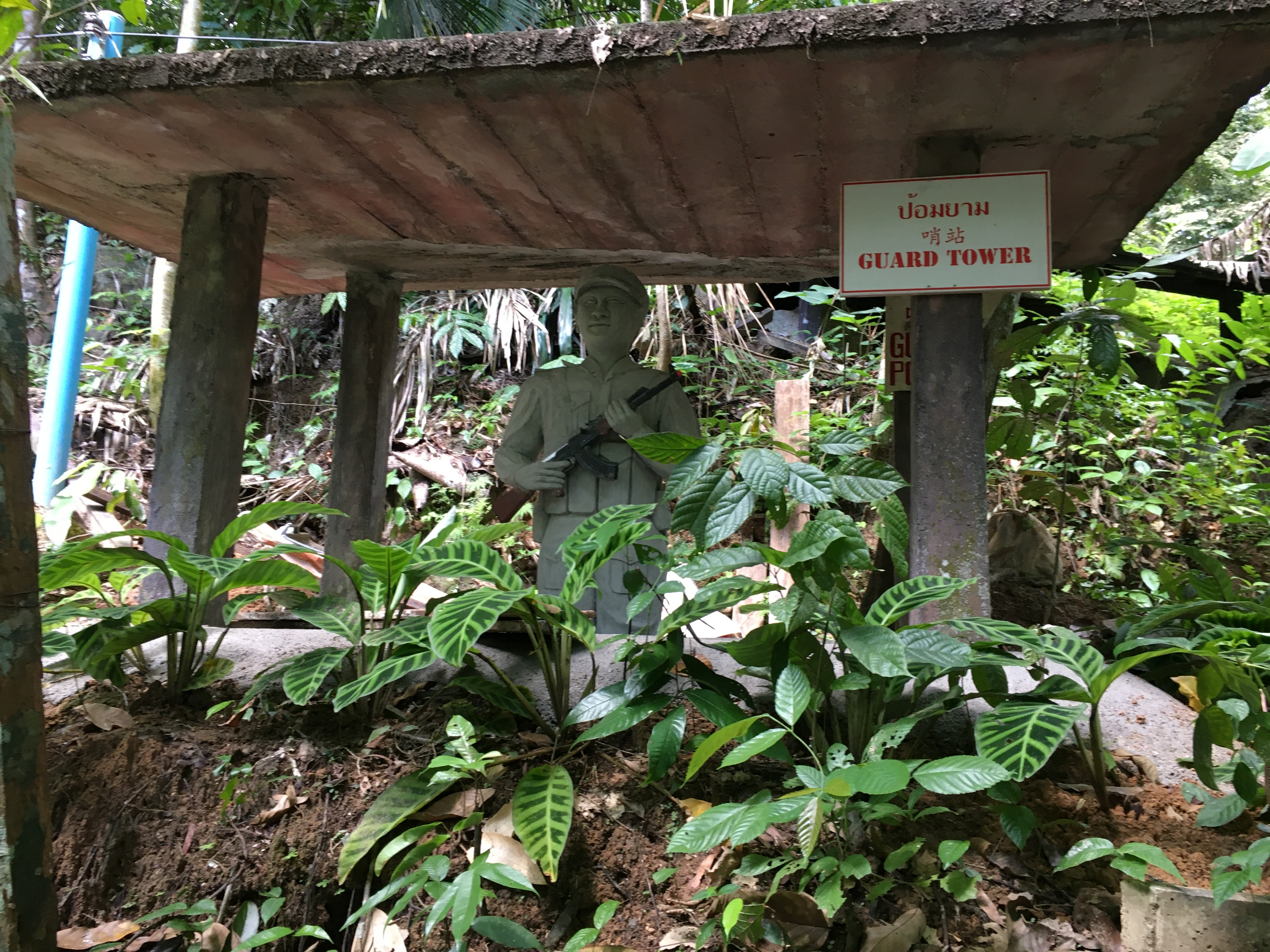
One of the props at the Piyamit Tunnels.

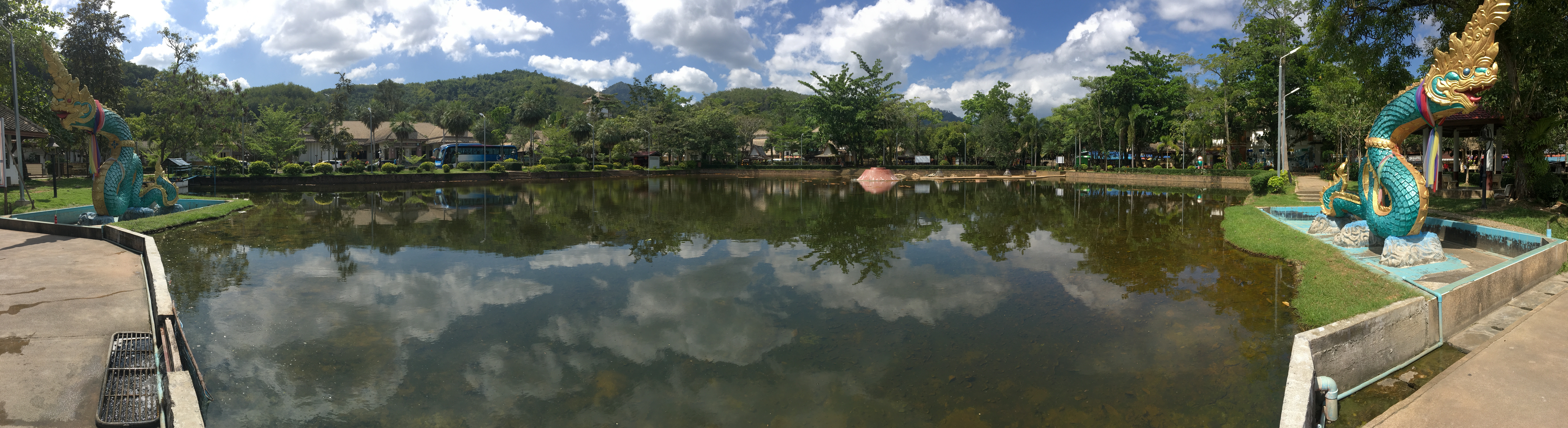
Bonamron Hot Spring, Tano Maero subdistrict.

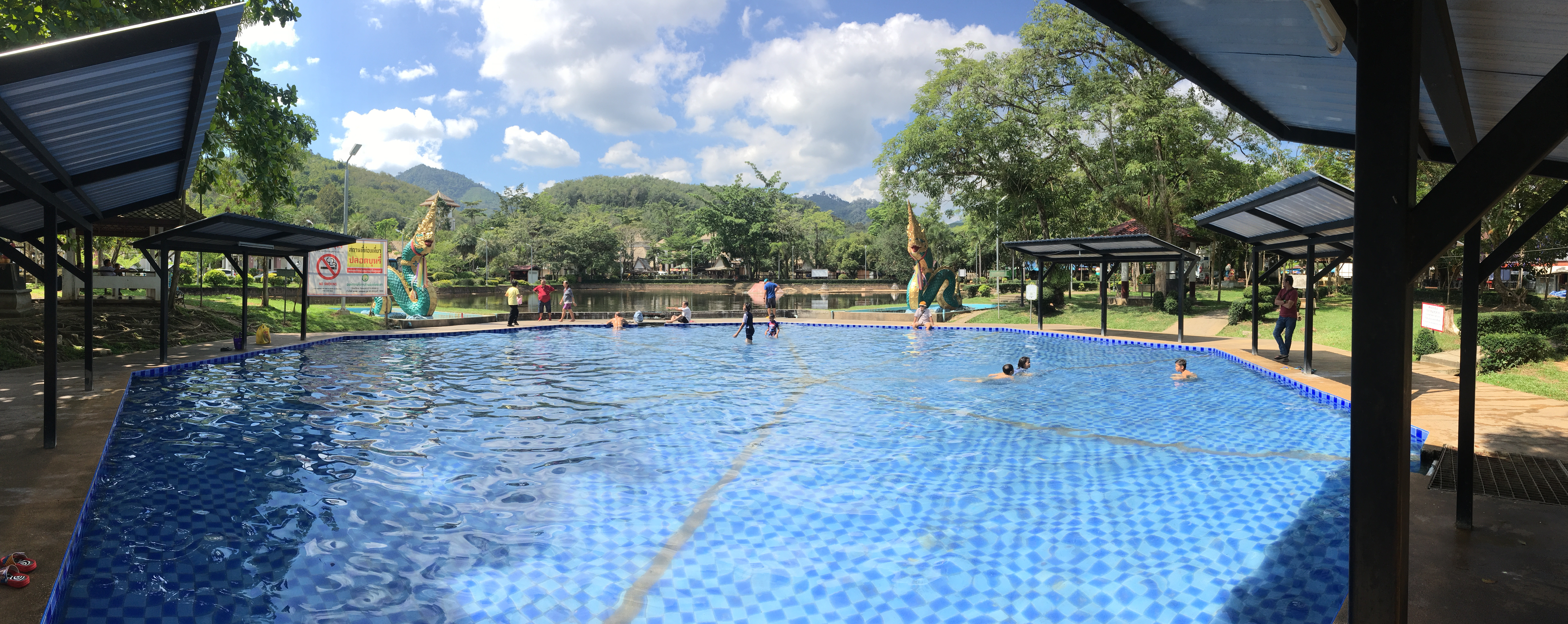
Hot spring water swimming pool at Bonamron Hot Spring, Tano Maero subdistrict.

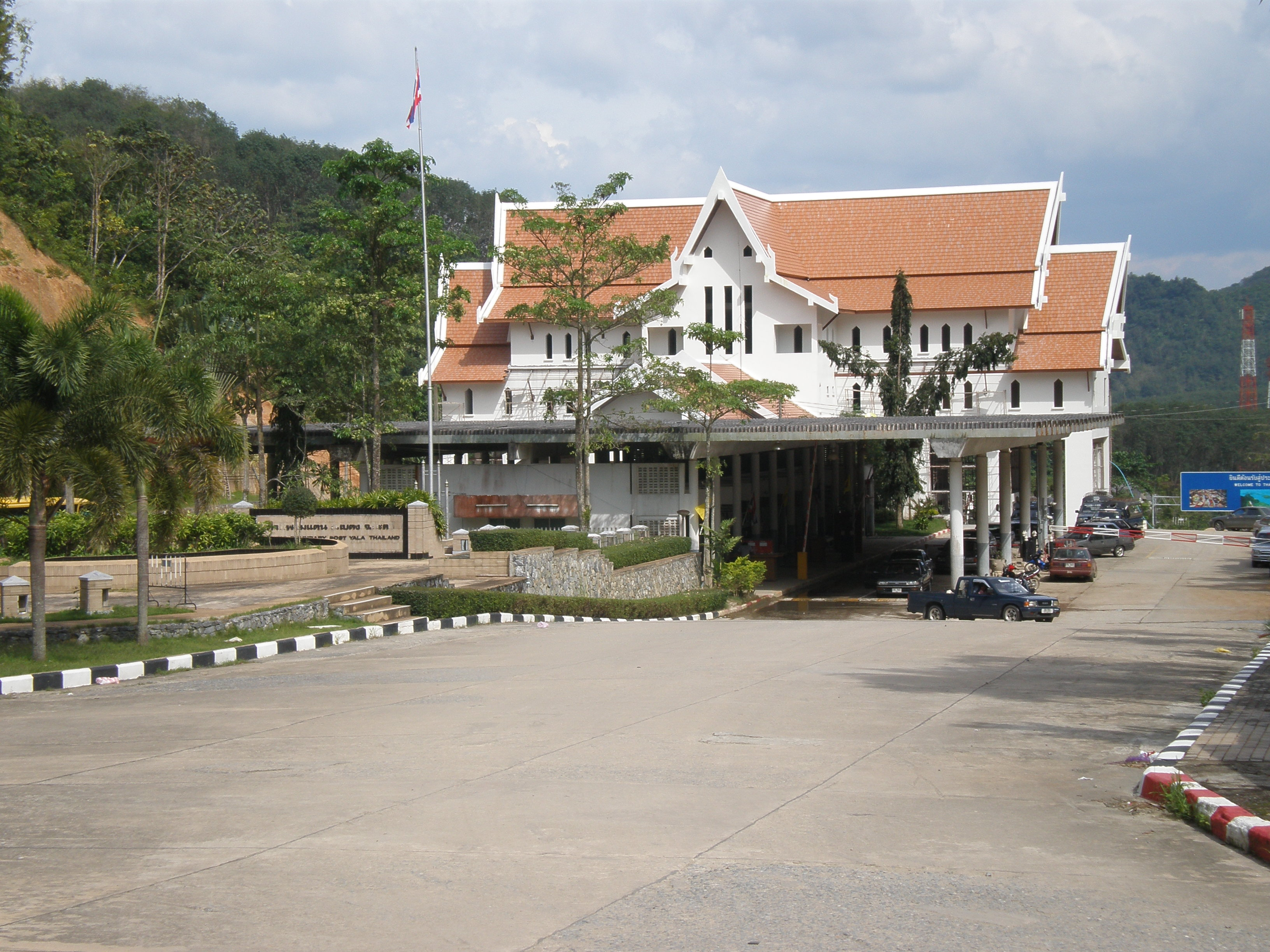
Thai immigration checkpoint at the Betong-Bukit Berapit border crossing.

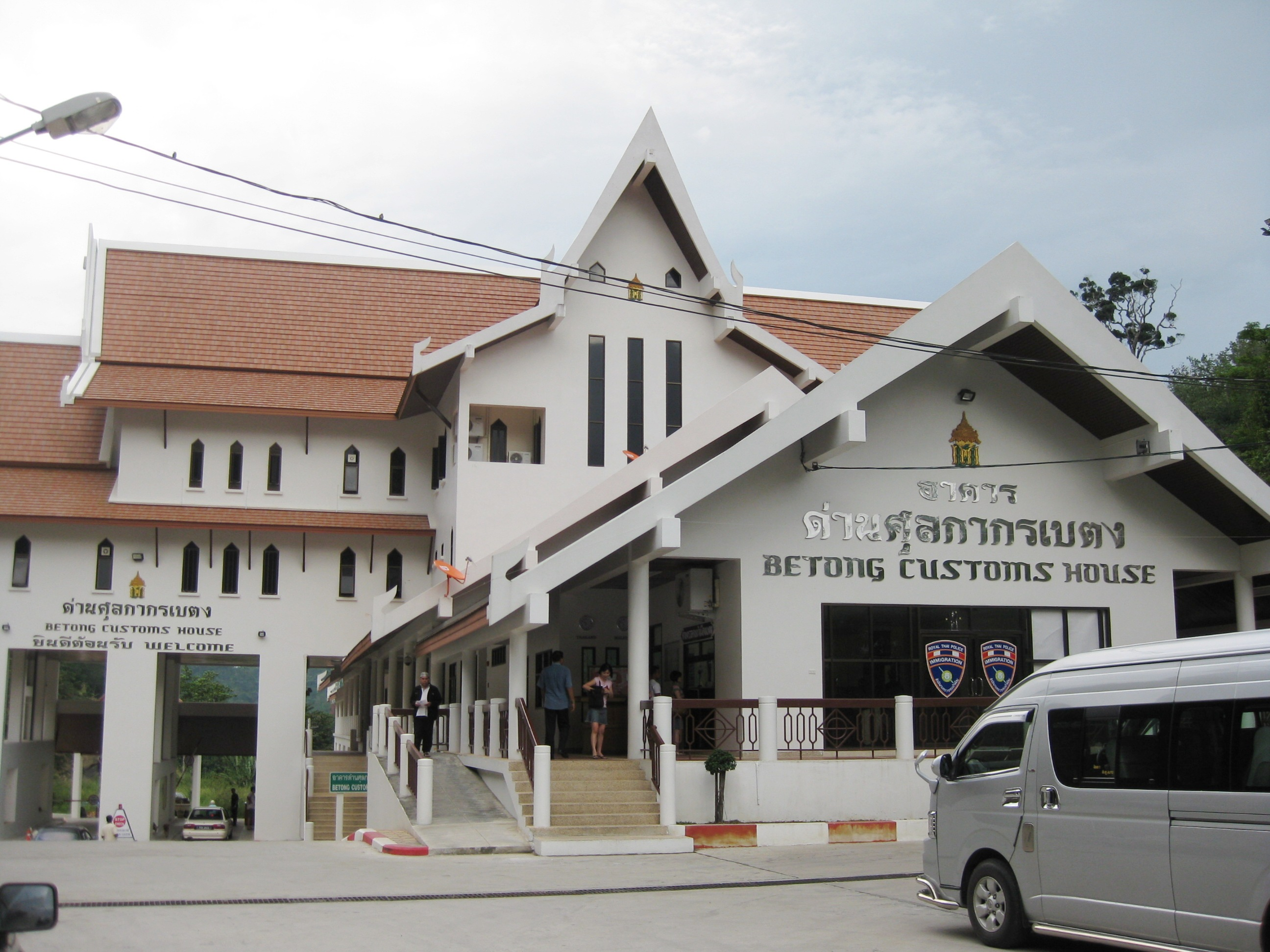
Thai immigration checkpoint at the Betong-Bukit Berapit border crossing.

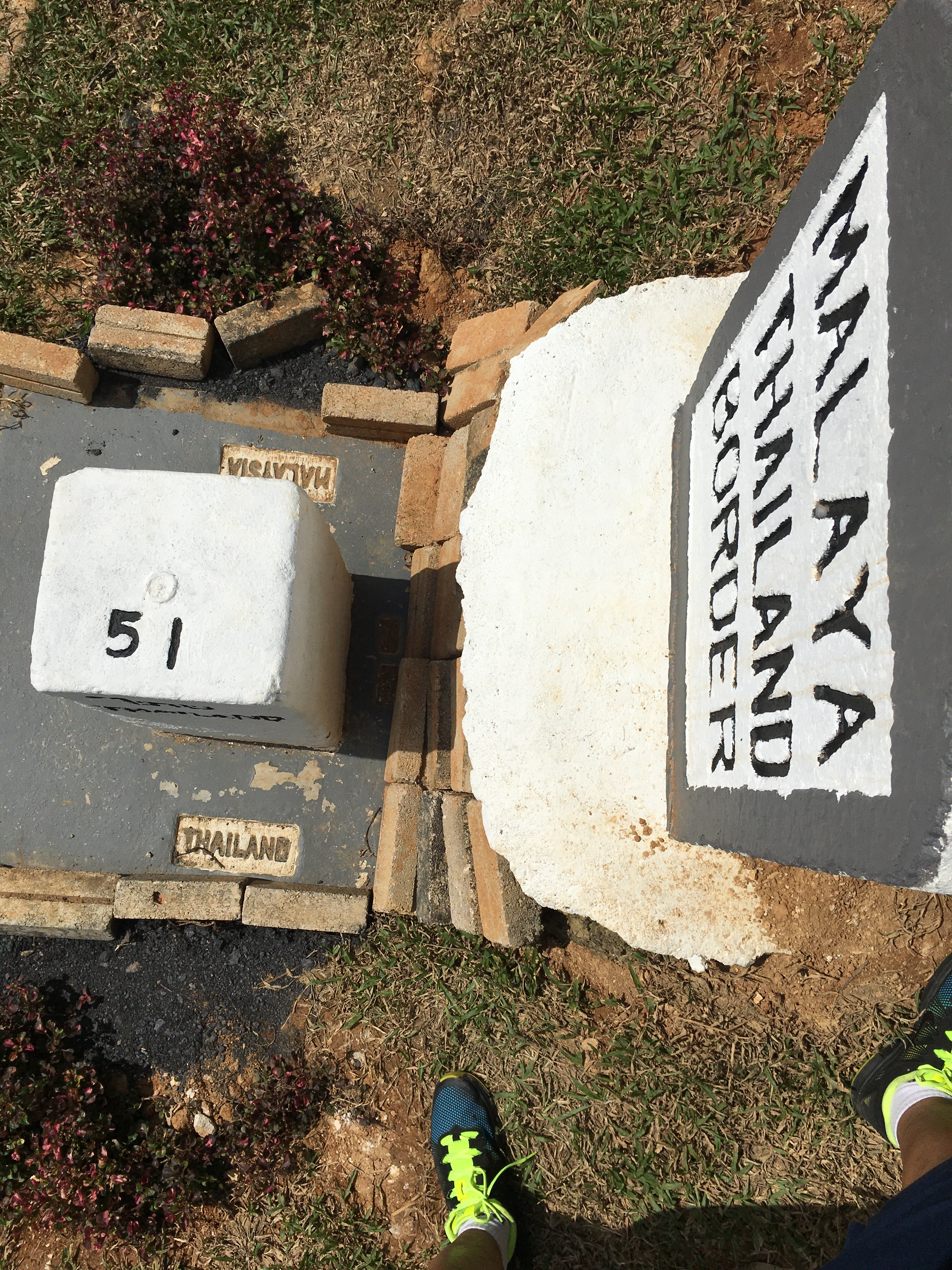
Malaysia-Thailand boundary stone at the Betong-Bukit Berapit border crossing.

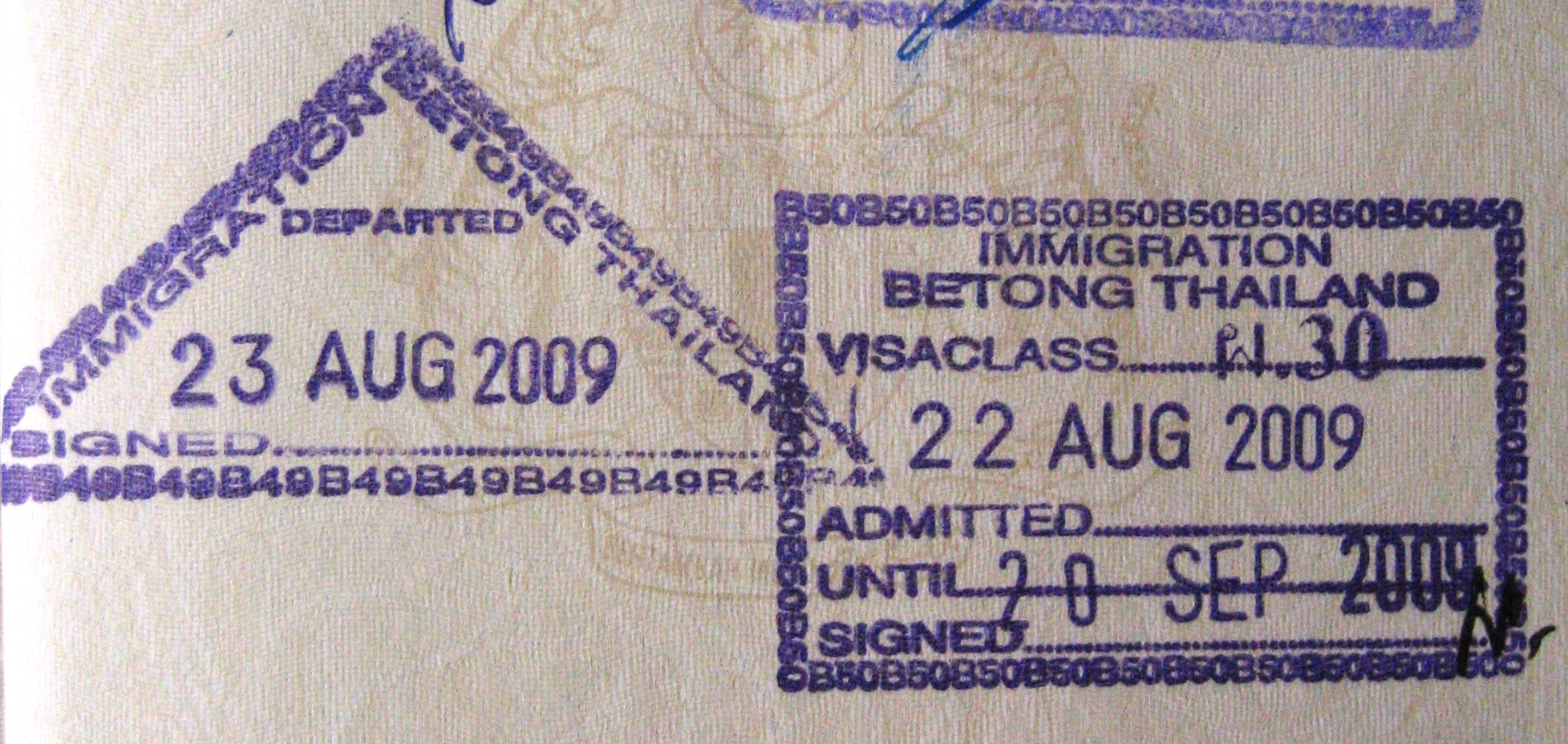
Entry and exit stamps from Betong checkpoint.
