= Yala province =

Coordinates: 6°32′24″N 101°16′52″E

Yala ยะลา
- Province

Other transcription(s)
  - Jawi: جالا (Jawi)
  - Rumi: Jala (Rumi)
  - Chinese: 惹拉 (Simplified)
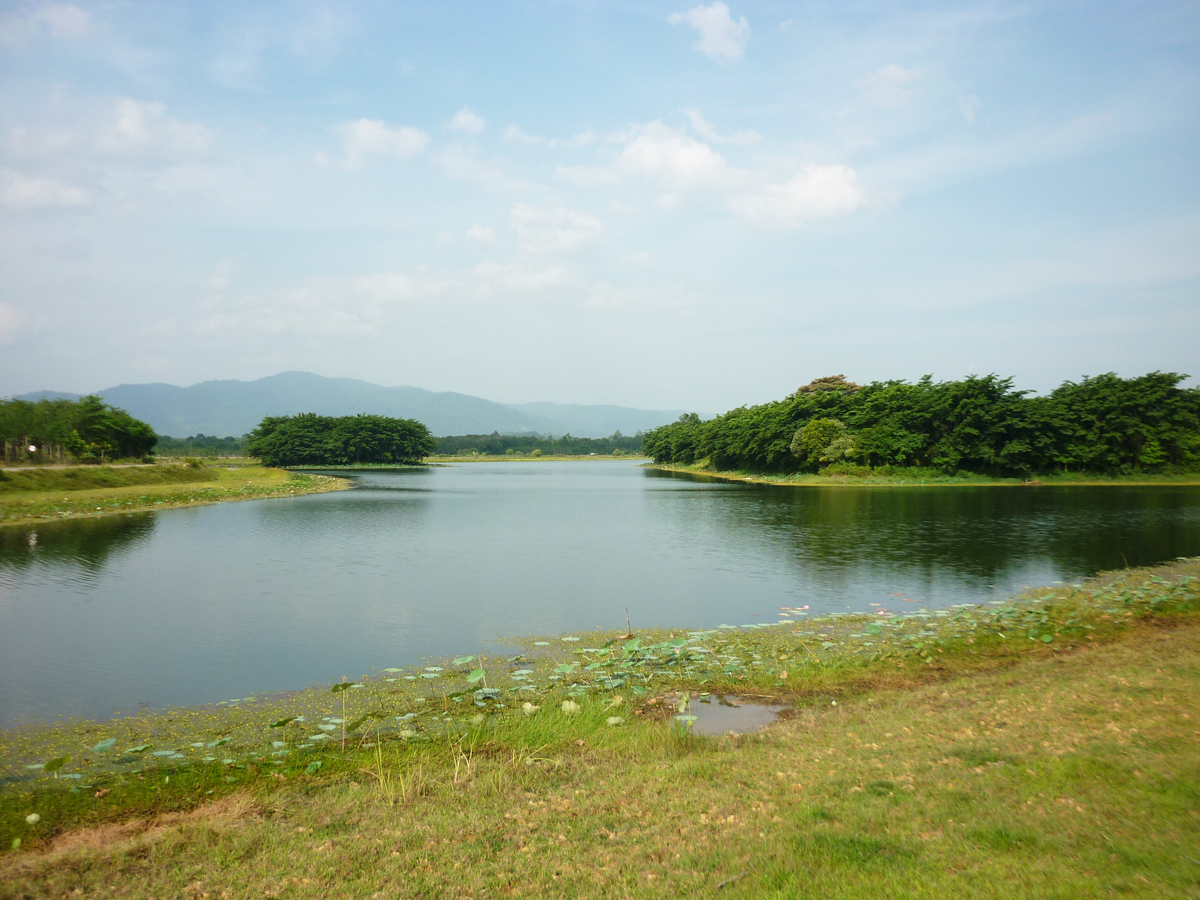
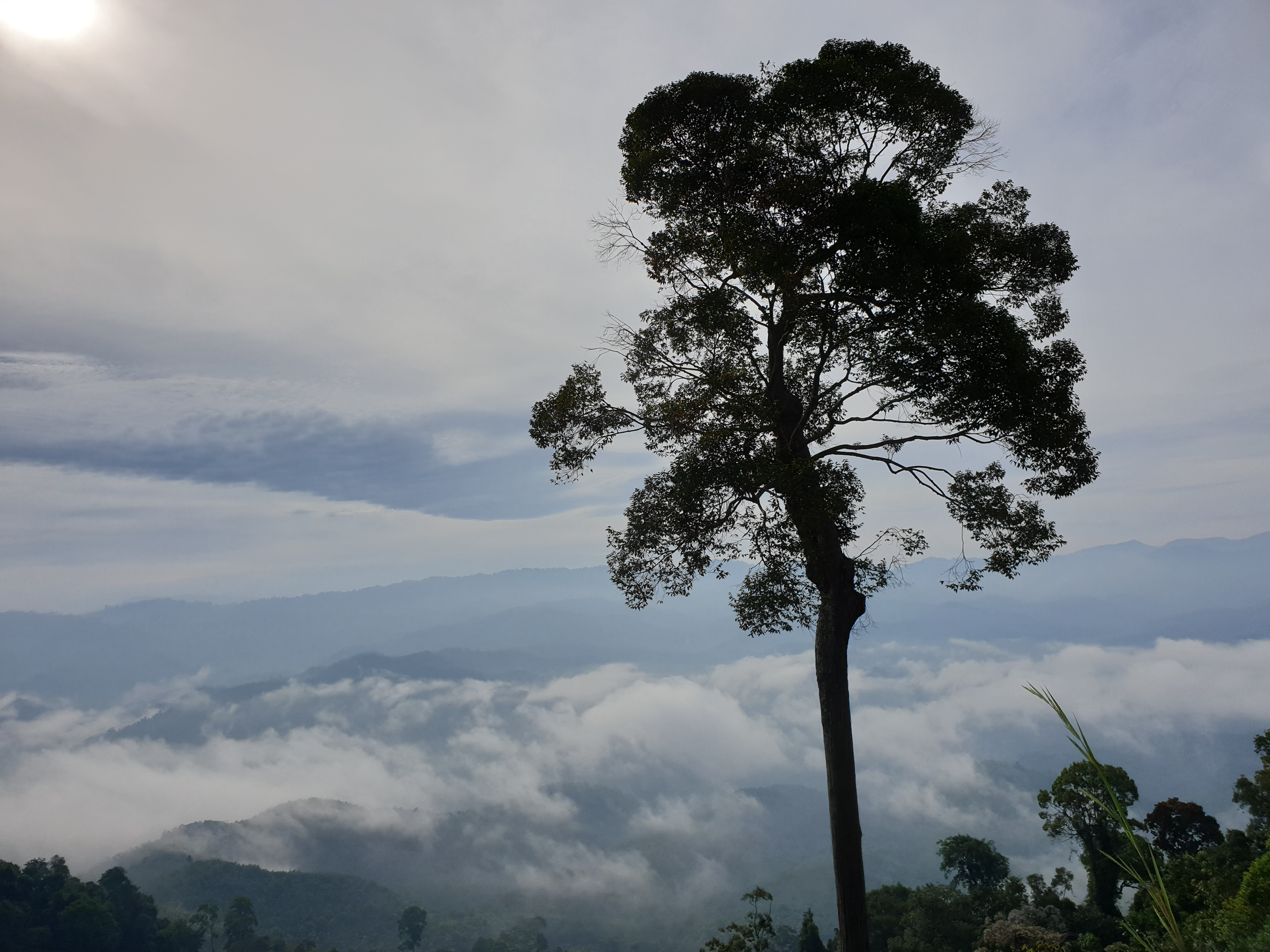
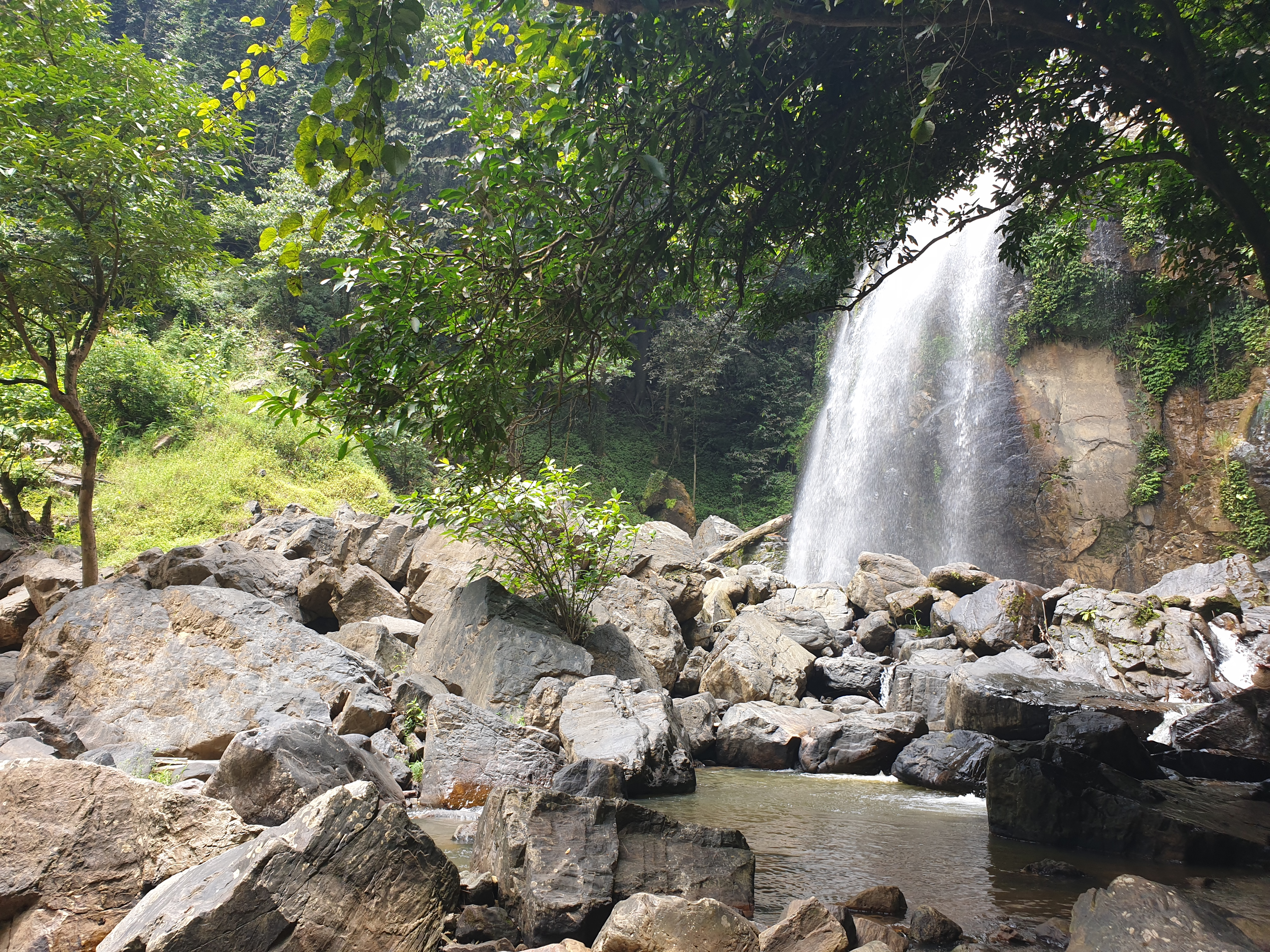
- From top: Bueng Nam Sai, a natural lake in Raman District, 26 km from Yala City, it was once the habitat of rare species of fish Asian arowana, Sea of Mist Aiyoeweng, Chaloem Phra Kiat King Rama IX Waterfall in Betong District

- Flag Seal
- Motto: ใต้สุดสยาม เมืองงามชายแดน ("Southernmost of Siam. The beautiful border city.")
- Map of Thailand highlighting Yala province
- Country: Thailand
- Capital: Yala

Government
  - Governor: Supot Rodruang Na Nongkhai

Area
  - Total: 4,476 km^{2} (1,728 sq mi)
  - Rank: 50th

Population (2024)
  - Total: ▲553,000
  - Rank: 46th
  - Density: 124/km^{2} (320/sq mi)
  - Rank: 37th

Human Achievement Index
  - HAI (2022): 0.6617 "high" Ranked 11th

GDP
  - Total: 43 billion baht (US$1.4 billion) (2019)
- Time zone: UTC+7 (ICT)
- Postal code: 95xxx
- Calling code: 073
- ISO 3166 code: TH-95
- Website: yala.go.th

Yala Provincial Administrative Organization องค์การบริหารส่วนจังหวัดยะลา
- Provincial Administrative Organization
- Interactive map of Yala Provincial Administrative Organization

Government
  - Type: Local administrative divisions
  - Body: Yala Provincial Administrative Organization
  - President: Mukhtar Matha
- Website: yalapao.go.th

Yala (Thai: ยะลา, pronounced [já(ʔ).lāː] Malay: Jala) is the southernmost Province (changwat) of Thailand. Neighboring provinces are (from northwest clockwise) Songkhla, Pattani, and Narathiwat. Yala is one of two landlocked provinces in southern Thailand, the other being Phatthalung. Its southern part borders Kedah and Perak of Malaysia.

== Geography ==
Yala province is in southern Thailand. The highest point of the Sankalakhiri Range (Northern Titiwangsa Mountains), the 1,533-meter (5,030 ft)-high Ulu Titi Basah (ฮูลูติติปาซา), is on the Thai/Malaysian border between Yala province and Perak. The total forest area is 1,455 km^{2} (562 sq mi) or 32.5 percent of provincial area.

=== National parks ===
There are three national parks, along with two other national parks, make up region 6 (Pattani branch) of Thailand's protected areas. (Visitors in fiscal year 2024)

Budo–Su-ngai Padi National Park	341 km^{2} (132 sq mi)	(29,966)
Bang Lang National Park	261 km^{2} (101 sq mi)	(22,468)
Namtok Sai Khao National Park	70 km^{2} (27 sq mi)	(120,669)

== Toponymy ==
The name "Yala" is the Thai transliteration of the Malay word "Jala" (Jawi: جالا), meaning "net", which was in turn derived from Sanskrit (Devanagari: जाल). The province is also known as "Jala" in Patani Malay language.

== History ==
The cave temple of Wat Khuhaphimuk holds a bronze stupa which Siriporn Sanghiran compares with examples from Nalanda and Bodh Gaya. Tham Silp and Khao Kampan are recorded in the same survey of thirty-five sites on the lower peninsula.

Historically, Pattani province was the centre of the Sultanate of Patani, a semi-independent Malay kingdom that paid tribute to the Thai kingdoms of Sukhothai and Ayutthaya. After Ayutthaya fell under Burmese control in 1767, the Sultanate of Patani gained full independence, but under King Rama I (reigned from 1782 to 1809), the area was again placed under Siam's control in 1785 and made a mueang. In 1808, Mueang Pattani was split into seven smaller mueang including Yala and Reman.

The province was recognized as part of Siam by the Anglo-Siamese Treaty of 1909, negotiated with the British Empire, while Siam surrendered its claims to Kelantan, Kedah, Terengganu, and Perlis.

There is a separatist movement in Yala, which after being dormant for many years, emerged again in 2004 and has become increasingly violent. Eight bombs exploded in the province over two days, on 6–7 April 2014. The bombings resulted in one death and 28 injuries, as well as damage to a warehouse estimated at 100 million baht.

The British Foreign and Commonwealth Office (FCO) in 2014 advised its citizens to only undertake essential travel in the province, while the Australian Government's Department of Foreign Affairs and Trade recommends that travellers completely avoid the province.

== Demographics ==
Religion in Yala (2019)
religion	percent
Islam	81.46%
Buddhism	18.45%
Christianity	0.08%
Other	0.01%

Together with Narathiwat, Pattani and Satun, Yala is one of the four provinces of Thailand with a Muslim majority. About 72 percent of the people are Malay-speaking Muslims and mainly live in rural locations. The remainder are Thai Buddhists (Southern Thai and Thai Chinese), who live in towns and cities.

== Symbols ==
The provincial seal shows a miner with simple mining tools including hoes, crowbars, and baskets. Yala was originally a mining town with tin and tungsten ores.

The provincial tree is the red saraca (Saraca declinata), and the provincial flower is the bullet wood (Mimusops elengi).

Khela mahseer (Tor douronensis) is the provincial fish, since it is a rare fish that can only be found in the lower southern region. Currently, Yala Provincial Fisheries Office is able to breed.

== Administrative divisions and provincial government ==
Yala is divided into eight districts (amphoe), which are further divided into 56 subdistricts (tambon) and 341 villages (muban).

Map	No.	Name	Thai	Jawi	Malay
	1	Mueang Yala	เมืองยะลา	جالا,جالر	Jala, Jalor
	2	Betong	เบตง	بتوڠ	Betung
	3	Bannang Sata	บันนังสตา	بنداڠ ستر	Bendang Setar
	4	Than To	ธารโต	اير كدوڠ	Air Kedung
	5	Yaha	ยะหา	جاها	Jaha/ Jahar
	6	Raman	รามัน	رمان	Reman
	7	Kabang	กาบัง	كابي	Kabae, Kabe
	8	Krong Pinang	กรงปินัง	كمڤوڠ فينڠ	Kampung Pinang

=== Local government ===
As of 26 November 2019 there are: one Yala Provincial Administration Organisation (ongkan borihan suan changwat) and 16 municipal (thesaban) areas in the province. Yala has city (thesaban nakhon) status and Sateng Nok and Betong have town (thesaban mueang) status. Further 13 subdistrict municipalities (thesaban tambon). The non-municipal areas are administered by 47 Subdistrict Administrative Organisations - SAO (ongkan borihan suan tambon).

== Transportation ==
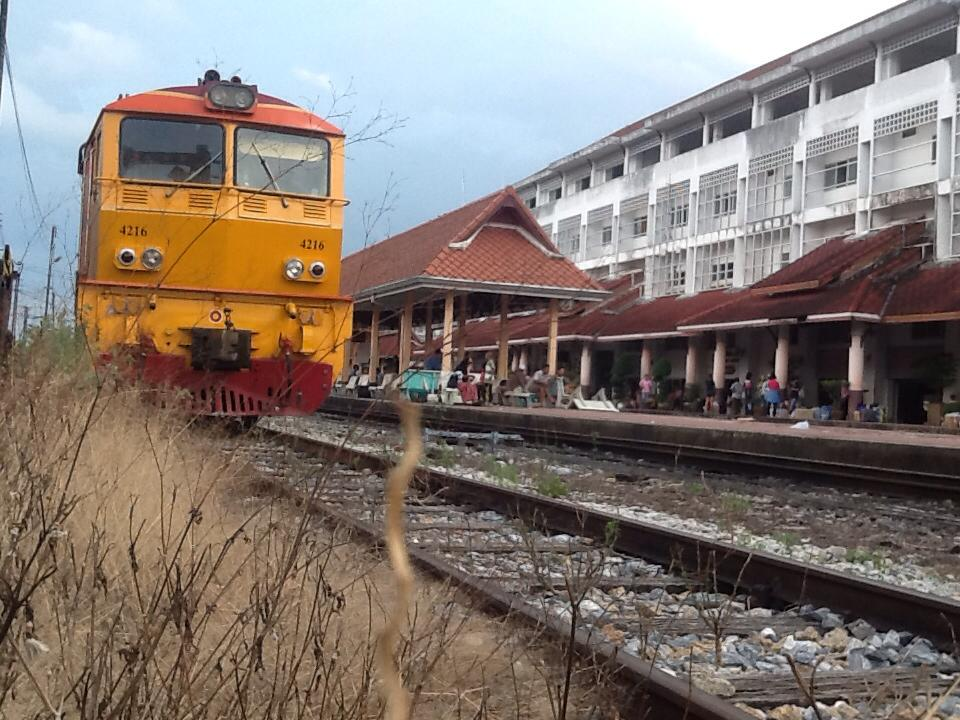
Yala Railway Station

In January 2022, Thailand's transport ministry completed the 1.9 billion baht Betong Airport. It opened in March 2022. Designed to handle 300 arrivals per hour, it is projected to serve 300,000 per year, which will later increase to over one million passengers per year, generating three billion baht for the district. Nok Air, Bangkok Airways, and Malaysia's Firefly Airlines had plans to fly to Betong in 2019. However, Nok Air was the only airline to operate flights to Betong; the service was terminated after 28 October 2022 due to high operational cost.

As of November 2024, Ezy Airlines had to operate a scheduled commercial flights from Betong to Hat Yai.

Yala is served by the State Railway of Thailand from the Yala Railway Station.

The province lies on Route 410 (Pattani–Betong Highway), which runs from Pattani through Yala and Betong before passing through the Thailand-Malaysia Border.

== Health ==
Yala's main hospital is Yala Hospital, a regional hospital operated by the Ministry of Public Health.

== Human achievement index 2022 ==
Health	Education	Employment	Income
47	66	6	38
Housing	Family	Transport	Participation
21	15	9	45
Province Yala, with an HAI 2022 value of 0.6617 is "high", occupies place 11 in the ranking.

Since 2003, United Nations Development Programme (UNDP) in Thailand has tracked progress on human development at sub-national level using the Human achievement index (HAI), a composite index covering all the eight key areas of human development. National Economic and Social Development Board (NESDB) has taken over this task since 2017.

Rank	Classification
1 - 13	"high"
14 - 29	"somewhat high"
30 - 45	"average"
46 - 61	"somewhat low"
62 - 77	"low"

Map with provinces and HAI 2022 rankings

== See also ==
- 2007 South Thailand bombings
- 2019 Yala attack
