= Kapang railway halt =

Railway station in Thailand

Kapang กะปาง
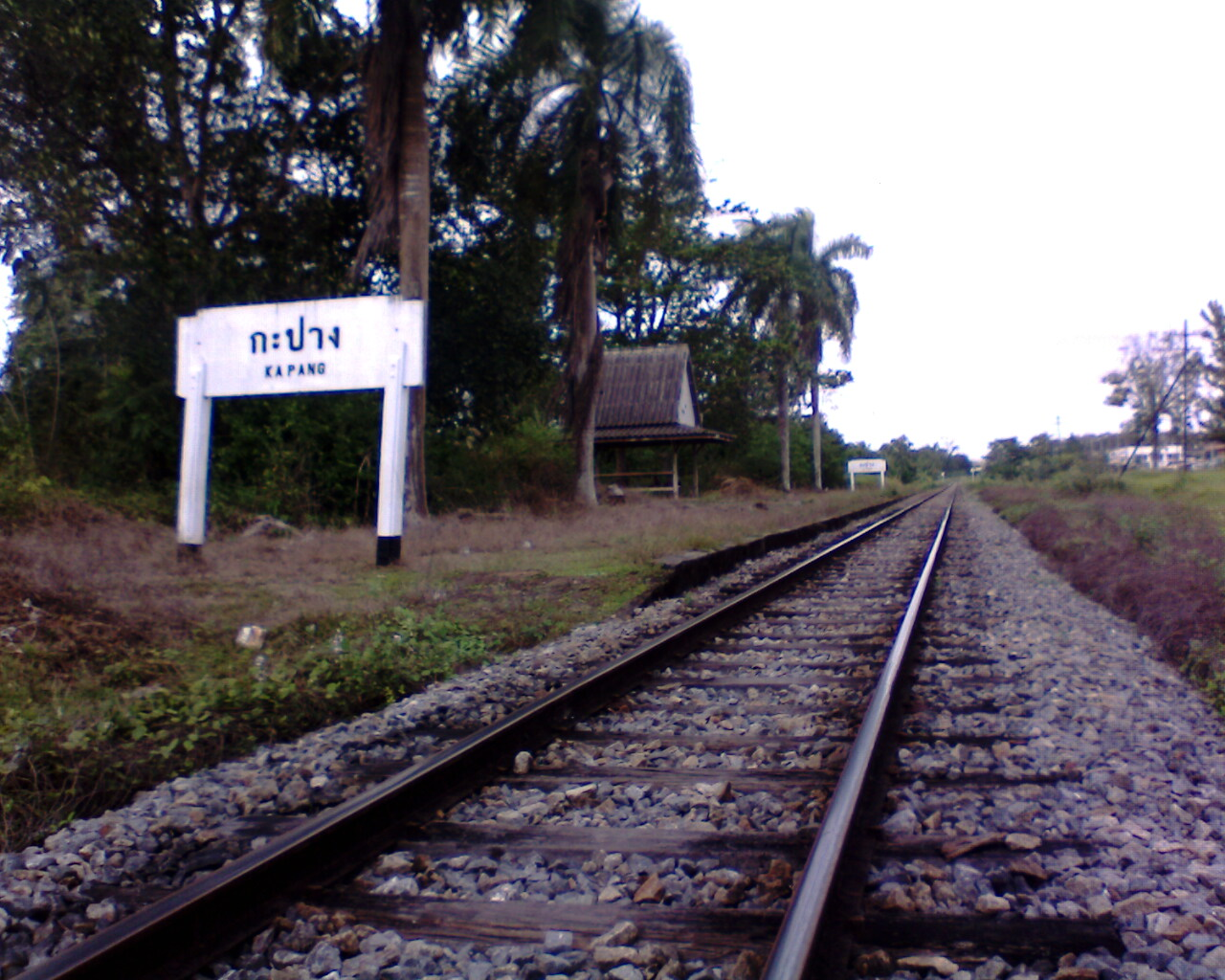
- Kapang railway station in January 2007 before reopened as halt.

General information
- Location: Tambon Khlong Pang, Amphoe Ratsada; Trang Province; Thailand
- Coordinates: 8.00445°N 99.642013°E
- Operator: State Railway of Thailand (SRT)
- Manager: Ministry of Transport
- Line: Kantang Branch
- Platforms: 1
- Tracks: 1

Construction
- Structure type: At-grade

Other information
- Station code: กป.
- Classification: Halt

History
- Opened: 1914 (station)
- Closed: 1981 (station)
- Rebuilt: 2008 (halt)

Services
| Preceding station | State Railway of Thailand | Following station |
|---|---|---|
| Thi Wang towards Thung Song Junction | Southern Line Kantang Branch | Huai Yot towards Kantang |
Location

Kapang railway halt (Thai: ที่หยุดรถไฟกะปาง) is a railway halt in Thailand located in Tambon Khlong Pang, Amphoe Ratsada, northeast Trang province. It is one of the railway halts of the Southern Line and is located 776.33 km (482.39 mi) from Thon Buri railway station.

Kapang initially opened as a railway station, however it was abandoned between 1981-2008, because it was burned down by Communist terrorists and was no longer usable. In August 2008, 5,000 people signed up for the government to resume train operations.
