= Somkid Pumpuang =

Thai serial killer

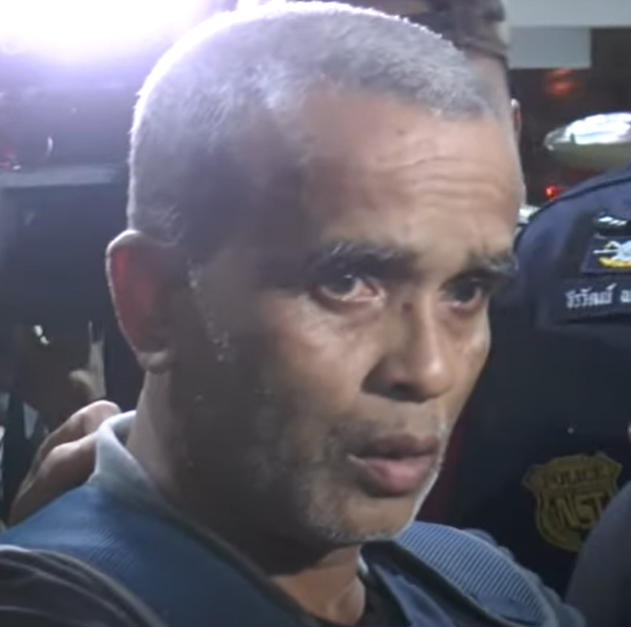
- Pumpuang in 2019
- Born: 7 January 1964 (age 62); Thung Song district, Nakhon Si Thammarat province, Thailand
- Other names: "Kid the Ripper" "Thailand's Jack the Ripper"
- Conviction: Murder x6
- Penalty: Death (2019); Death; commuted to life imprisonment and later to 13 years (2005)

Details
- Victims: 6
- Span of crimes: January – June 2005; 2019
- Country: Thailand
- States: Mukdahan, Lampang, Trang, Udon Thani, Buriram, Khon Kaen
- Date apprehended: 18 December 2019

Somkid Pumpuang (Thai: สมคิด พุ่มพวง; born 7 January 1964), known as Kid the Ripper (Thai: คิดเดอะริปเปอร์), is a Thai serial killer who was convicted and sentenced to life imprisonment for murdering five masseuses from January to June 2005. After having his sentence reduced to 13 years and being released in 2019, he murdered another woman seven months later, for which he was convicted and sentenced to death.

== Early life ==
Somkid Pumpuang was born on 7 January 1964, in the Thung Song district. When he was eight years old, his father left him to live with his uncle, and during this time, Pumpuang started stealing. One day, after he stole a teacher's bicycle, he was expelled from school. When he was 14 or 15 years old, his uncle found him work at a sawmill in the Thung Song district, where Pumpuang dealt with driving rubberwood. Eventually, his uncle caught him stealing money from his employer, resulting in Pumpuang being kicked out and moving back in with his father in Trang province. He quarrelled regularly with his father and continued to steal. Eventually, he was forced to flee the village after he was attacked by a group of teenagers, causing him to travel around the country.

== Murders ==
From 30 January to 21 June 2005, Pumpuang killed five women in several different provinces, usually by strangulation or by tying them up and holding their heads under water. The killings took place in hotels, and he usually stole items like cellphones from the women.

The victims were the following:

1. Warunee Phimphabutr, café singer: hands tied behind her back with her own bra and drowned in a bathtub in a hotel in Mueang Mukdahan district, Mukdahan province on January 30. A gold necklace, mobile phone, and a motorcycle were stolen.
2. Phongphan Sapchai, masseuse: strangled in a hotel in Mueang Lampang district, Lampang province on June 4.
3. Patcharee Amatanirand, café singer: strangled with a wire in a hotel in Thap Thiang subdistrict, Trang province on June 11.
4. Porntawan Pangkabutr, masseuse: strangled in a hotel in Mueang Udon Thani district, Udon Thani province on June 18.
5. Sompong Pimpornpirm, masseuse: strangled in a mansion in Mueang Buriram district, Buriram province on June 21.

=== Arrest, trial, and detention ===
Six days after the final murder, Pumpuang was arrested while leading a young woman to a hotel in Chaiyaphum, where officers from the Crime Suppression Division found a cellphone stolen from the final victim. After linking all five cases back to him, he was charged with five counts of murder and theft; the prosecution sought the death sentence for three of the murders. However, Pumpuang pleaded guilty to four of them (with the exception of Amatanirand), which resulted in an automatic life sentence, coupled with the remaining two life sentences which were sought.

Following multiple grants of clemency over the years, Pumpuang's sentence was eventually reduced to 13 years imprisonment, scheduling his release date for 2019. During his imprisonment, he was described as a model inmate, which contributed significantly to the reduction of his sentence.

=== Release and new murder ===
On 17 May 2019, Pumpuang was released from the Nong Khai Provincial Prison and shortly after began dating 51-year-old Rassamee Mulichan, a housekeeper at a local hotel. On 15 December of that year, the couple's neighbours reported that they had apparently been arguing until the evening when everything suddenly went quiet. After she did not come out of the apartment to leave for work the following morning, the neighbour called out for Rassamee, but received no response. He then opened the door and entered the household, where he found her body stuffed under the bed. Rassamee had been wrapped up in a blanket and transparent tape, with the former also being tied around her neck, with a cellphone charger tied around her ankle. The neighbour called out for Pumpuang, but again received no response.

At the subsequent autopsy, coroners determined the cause of death to be suffocation, and a police investigation team was dispatched to interrogate witnesses. After being presented with photographs of multiple suspects, the witnesses identified the man they last saw leaving the house as Pumpuang, which was further reinforced by other evidence found at the crime scene itself.

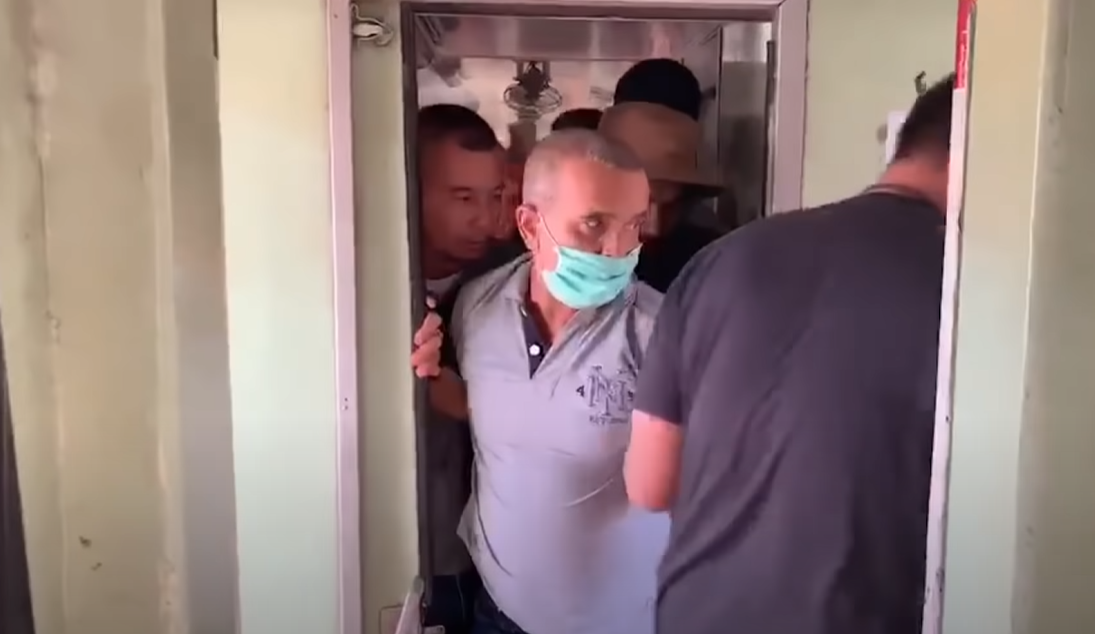
Pumpuang's arrest

Four days later, authorities at the Pak Chong Provincial Police Station received a tip-off from a citizen who claimed that his girlfriend had seen a man resembling Pumpuang on a train. Soon after, detectives surrounded the Pak Chong Railway Station, and after the train stopped, they raided the second carriage and located Pumpuang, who was wearing a mask covering his nose and mouth to prevent possible identification. He did not resist his arrest and was brought to the local police station for interrogation.

During interrogation, Pumpuang testified that on the day before the murder, he had taken Rasmee's motorcycle and driven to the Khon Kaen Hospital before safely returning it. This act supposedly angered her and caused them to quarrel, which eventually resulted in him manually strangling her until she fainted. He then took out a wire and continued strangling her until she was dead. After this, Pumpuang took out the transparent tape and wrapped it around her neck, tied the phone to her feet, stowed the body under the mattress, and fled the residence.

Eventually, Pumpuang was charged with the murder, convicted, and sentenced to death. His release and ability to commit a new crime sparked a debate about the royal pardons and the usage of the death penalty in the country. The Director-General of the Department of Corrections, Naratch Sawetanan, also announced that a review would be conducted on how examinations for mentally-ill inmates are conducted, despite the fact that Pumpuang himself has never been diagnosed with any such illness. The couple who reported the tip that led to the killer's arrest were later given awards for their bravery, as well as 80,000 baht.

== See also ==
- List of serial killers by country
