= Bang Rak, Trang =

Bang Rak บางรัก
- Tambon
- Bang Rak
- Etymology: love hamlet
- Nickname: Tha Chin
- Motto: Good Quality of Life, Sustainable Organic Farming, Return to Sufficiency
- Interactive map of Bang Rak
- Coordinates: 7°32′49.2″N 99°34′38.1″E
- Country: Thailand
- Province: Trang
- District: Mueang Trang

Government
  - Type: Subdistrict Administrative Organization (SAO)
  - Mayor: Preecha Phaknam
  - Vice mayor: Wirote Kaewphittaya

Area
  - Total: 9.6 km^{2} (3.7 sq mi)

Population (2008)
  - Total: 3,982
  - Density: 410/km^{2} (1,100/sq mi)
- Time zone: UTC+7 (ICT)
- Postcode: 92000
- Area code: (+66) 02

Bang Rak (Thai: บางรัก, pronounced [bāːŋ rák]) is a tambon (subdistrict) of Mueang Trang District, Trang Province.

== History ==
Bang Rak is part of Mueang Trang District otherwise known as downtown Trang. It is classified as one of the oldest populated places of Trang. It is a quay since ancient times where the Chinese settled and lived on the banks of the Trang River. Hence, the Trang River has another name "Tha Chin River" (แม่น้ำท่าจีน, pronounced [tʰâː tɕīːn], lit. 'Chinese port river'). Therefore, Bang Rak area is known as "Tha Chin" as well.

== Geography ==
Its terrain is a lowland area with the Trang River or locally known as Tha Chin River flowing through it. The subdistrict is bounded by other subdistricts (from the north clockwise): Nong Trut and Na Ta Luang with Khok Lo as well as Khuan Pring in its district, Khuan Thani in Kantang District, and Na To Ming in its district again.

There is an island in the middle of the Trang River that looks like a map of Thailand in the Nong Pluak Public Space. It is an artificial island completed on April 30, 1990.

== Administration ==
Bang Rak is governed by the Subdistrict Administrative Organization Bang Rak (SAO Bang Rak).

The area also consists of six administrative muban (village)

No.	Name	Thai
1.	Ban Nong Prue	บ้านหนองปรือ
2.	Ban Nam Phut	บ้านน้ำผุด
3.	Ban Tai	บ้านใต้
4.	Ban Tha Chin	บ้านท่าจีน
5.	Ban Saphan Chang	บ้านสะพานช้าง
6.	Ban Khuan Yod Thong	บ้านควนยอดทอง

The emblem of the Subdistrict Administrative Organization shows a Chinese junk sailing on the Trang River.

== Population ==
As of May 2008, it had a total population of 3,982 (1,950 men, 2,032 women) in 1,510 households.

== Places ==
- Wat Prasitthichai (Wat Tha Chin)
- Saparachinee 2 School
