= Thi Wang railway station =

Railway station in Thailand

Thi Wang ที่วัง

General information
- Location: Thi Wang Subdistrict, Thung Song District; Nakhon Si Thammarat Province; Thailand
- Coordinates: 8.0776°N 99.6592°E
- Operator: State Railway of Thailand
- Manager: Ministry of Transport
- Line: Kantang Branch
- Distance: 765.574 km (475.7 mi) from Thon Buri
- Platforms: 2
- Tracks: 4

Construction
- Structure type: At-grade

Other information
- Classification: Class 3

Services
Preceding station	State Railway of Thailand	Following station
Thung Song Junction Terminus	Southern Line Kantang Branch	Kapang Halt towards Kantang
Location

Thi Wang railway station (Thai: สถานีรถไฟที่วัง) is a railway station located in Thi Wang Subdistrict, Thung Song District, Nakhon Si Thammarat. The station is a class 3 railway station and is located 765.574 km (475.7 mi) from Thon Buri railway station.

== Train services ==
- Rapid train No. 167 / 168 Bangkok–Kantang–Bangkok
