= Bang Rak (disambiguation) =

Bang Rak may refer to:

- Bang Rak District, a district (khet) of Bangkok, Thailand
  - Bang Rak Subdistrict, a subdistrict (khwaeng) and historic neighbourhood in Bang Rak District
- Bang Rak, Trang, a subdistrict (tambon) in Mueang Trang District, Trang Province
- Bang Rak Beach on the island of Ko Samui, Surat Thani
