= Trang railway station =

Railway station in Thailand

Coordinates: 7.5544°N 99.6046°E

Trang ตรัง
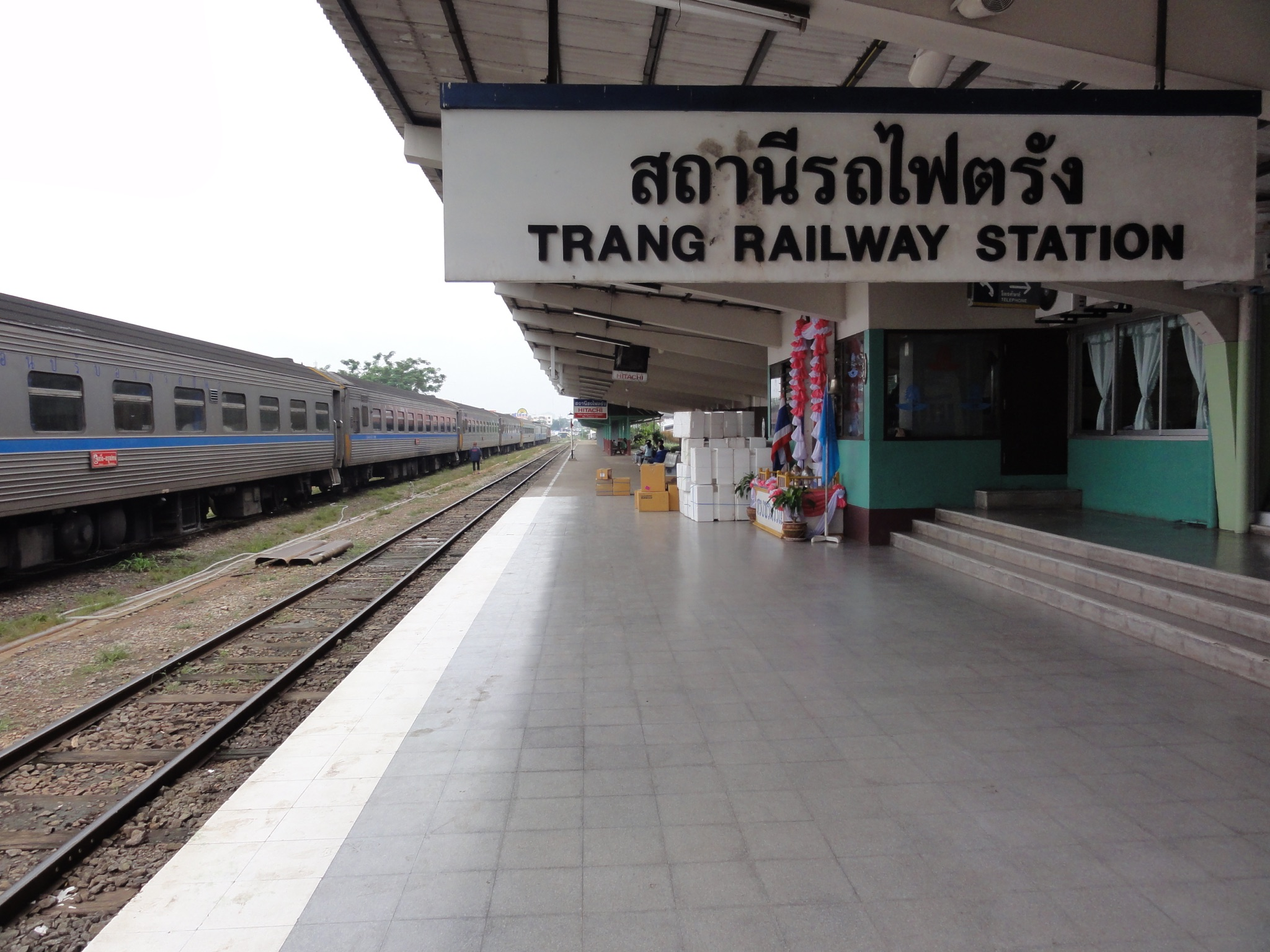

General information
- Location: Sathani Road, Thap Thiang Subdistrict, Mueang Trang District; Trang Province; Thailand
- Operator: State Railway of Thailand
- Manager: Ministry of Transport
- Platforms: 2
- Tracks: 3

Other information
- Station code: ตร.
- Classification: Class 1

History
- Opened: April 1913
- Rebuilt: 1969
- Former names: Thap Thiang

Services
Preceding station	State Railway of Thailand	Following station
Huai Yot towards Thung Song Junction	Southern Line Kantang Branch	Kantang Terminus
Location

Trang railway station is a railway station located in Thap Thiang Subdistrict, Trang City, Trang. The station is a class 1 railway station and is located 829.28 km (515.3 mi) from Thon Buri railway station. The station opened in April 1913 on the Southern Line section Kantang–Huai Yot. Trang Station is the alighting point for easier access to islands in the Andaman Sea.

The station building was first opened in 1913, then demolished and rebuilt in 1969, and has been in use since. Following the establishment of the railway station, the surrounding area developed various buildings such as hotels and shophouses along Rama VI Road, the first official road in Trang province. In the past, when transportation was less developed, residents from other provinces such as Phuket or Surat Thani had to use this station to travel by train to Bangkok. Most of the buildings on Rama VI Road are built in Sino-Portuguese architecture style.

== Train services ==
- Express No. 83 / 84 Krung Thep Aphiwat – Trang – Krung Thep Aphiwat
- Rapid No. 167 / 168 Krung Thep Aphiwat – Kantang – Krung Thep Aphiwat
