= Thap Thiang subdistrict =

Coordinates: 7°33′24.6″N 99°36′35.6″E

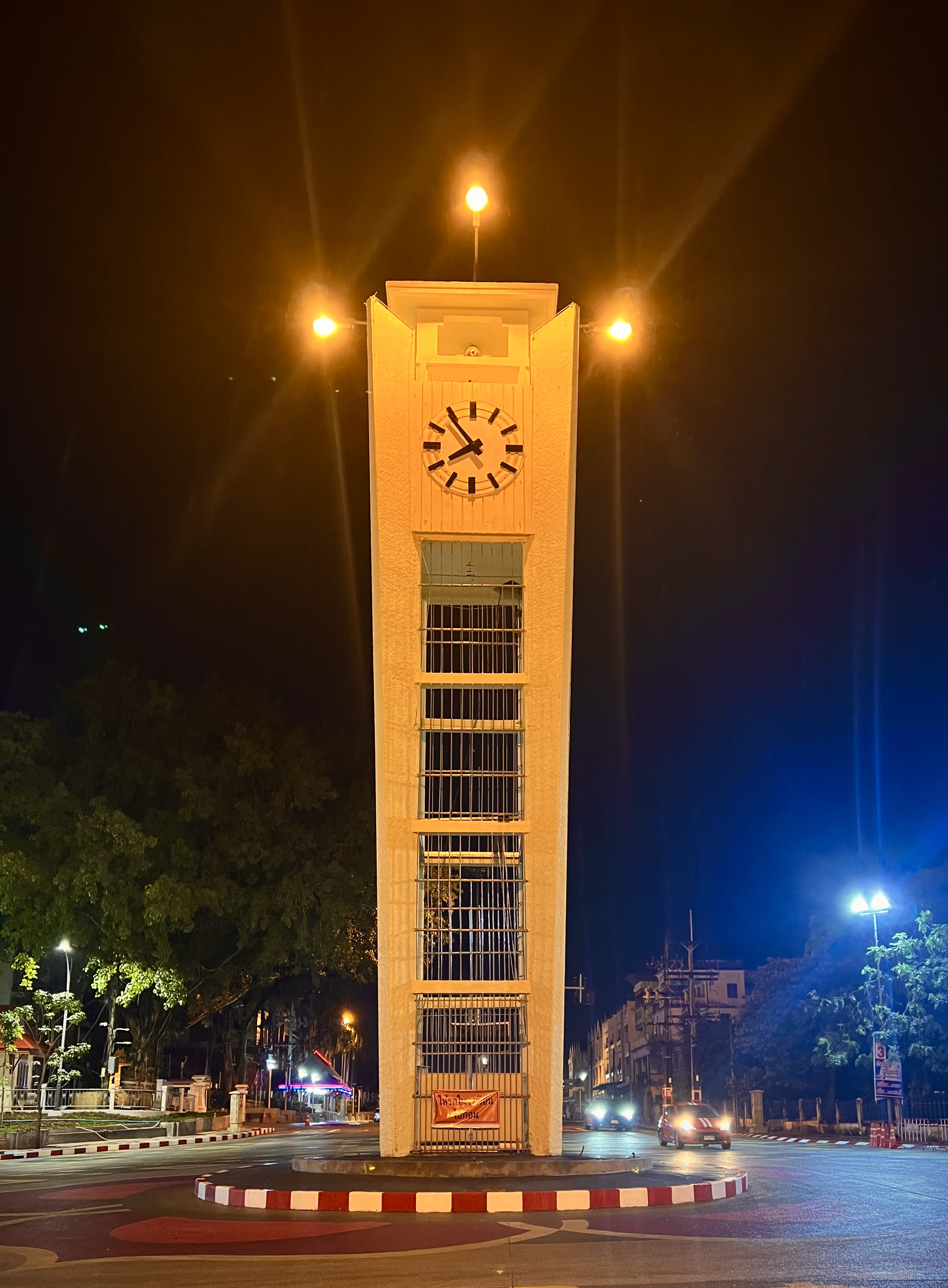
Trang Clock Tower, landmark of the area (Note: The side hill used to be the location of the provincial hall.)

Thap Thiang Subdistrict (Thai: ทับเที่ยง, pronounced [tʰáp̚.tʰîǎːŋ]) is a tambon (sub-district) of Mueang Trang District, Trang Province regarded as the administrative center of the province. Thap Thiang has an area of 14.77 km^{2} (about 5.70 mi^{2}) and a population of 59,637 people in 2017.

== Geography ==
Neighbouring tambons are (from the north clockwise): Na Ta Luang, Ban Pho, Khok Lo, Bang Rak.

== History ==
Thap Thiang has a history dating back over 100 years. Its name, which means "rest at noon", is traditionally believed to come from King Chulalongkorn (Rama V), who was said to have stopped and rested in a pavilion here during midday. Later, in 1915, the capital district of Trang was relocated from Kantang to Thap Thiang.

However, historical research suggests that King Chulalongkorn never actually visited Thap Thiang. Therefore, it is now believed that the name likely refers to merchants who paused here around noon to rest, cook, or have lunch during their trading journeys in the past.

Originally, the area was known as "Tai Phru" (ท้ายพรุ). After 1938, the name was officially changed to "Thap Thiang". Today, it is home to several important landmarks, including Trang Clock Tower, Trang Provincial Hall, Trang Governor's Residence, Dugong Circle, Krapang Surin Public Park, Trang Railway Station, Thumrin Thana Hotel, and Trang Hospital.

== Administration ==
The tambon is administered by the city municipality (Thesaban Nakhon) Trang (เทศบาลนครตรัง)

== Notable people ==
- Chuan Leekpai: two times Prime Minister
- Chiranan Pitpreecha: S.E.A. Write Award poet
