= Huai Yot railway station =

Railway station in Thailand

Coordinates: 7.7861°N 99.6381°E

Huai Yot ห้วยยอด
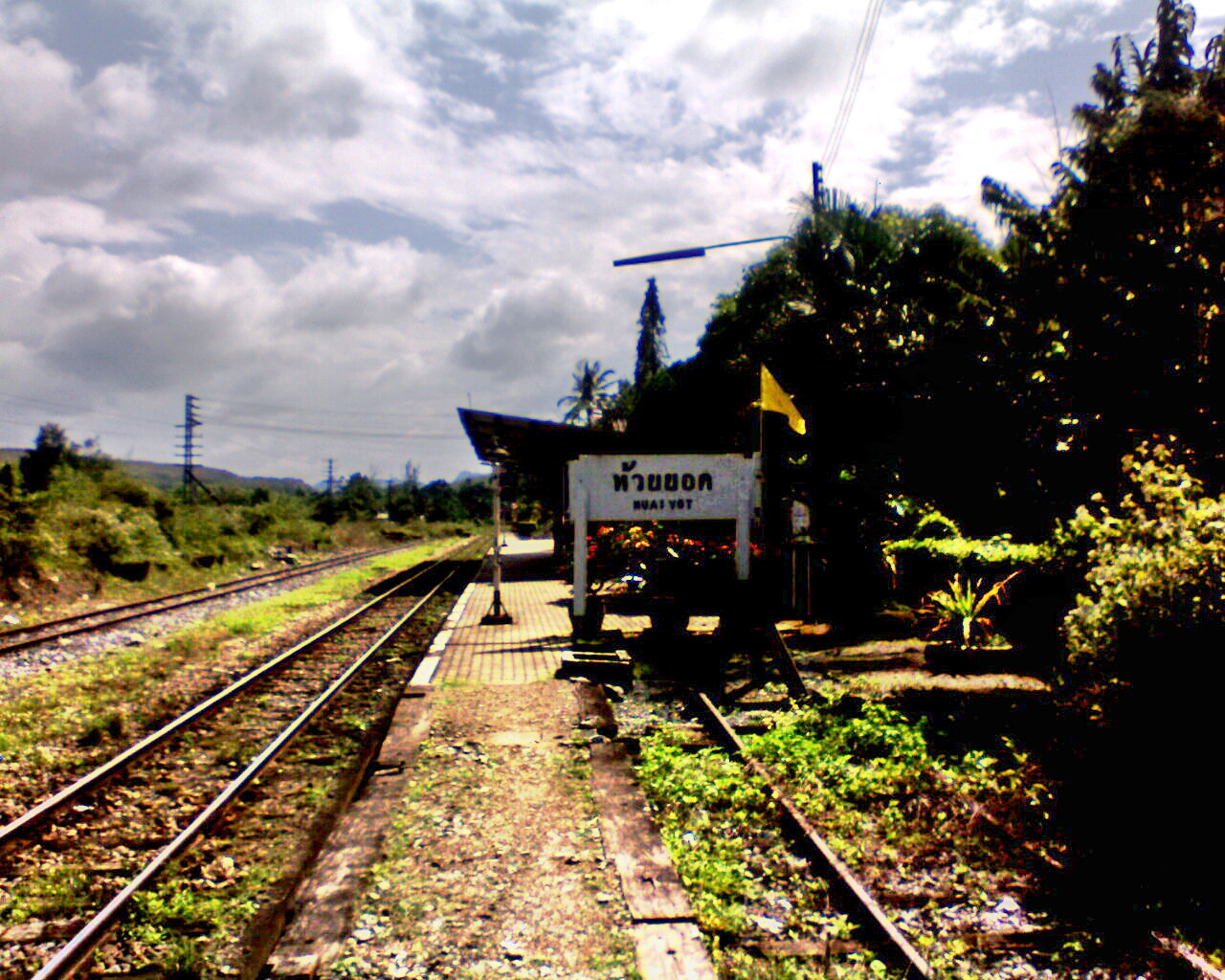

General information
- Location: Thesaban 12 Road, Huai Yot Subdistrict, Huai Yot District; Trang Province; Thailand
- Operator: State Railway of Thailand
- Manager: Ministry of Transport
- Line: Kapang Branch
- Platforms: 1
- Tracks: 2

Other information
- Station code: ยอ.
- Classification: Class 2

History
- Opened: April 1913

Services
Preceding station	State Railway of Thailand	Following station
Kapang Halt towards Thung Song Junction	Southern Line Kantang Branch	Trang towards Kantang
Location

Huai Yot railway station is a railway station located in Huai Yot Subdistrict, Huai Yot District, Trang. The station is a class 2 railway station and is located 800.826 km (497.6 mi) from Thon Buri railway station. The station opened in April 1913, on the Southern Line section Kantang–Huai Yot.

== Train services ==
- Express train No. 83 / 84 Bangkok–Trang–Bangkok
- Rapid train No. 167 / 168 Bangkok–Kantang–Bangkok
