= Mueang Trang district =

Mueang Trang เมืองตรัง
- District
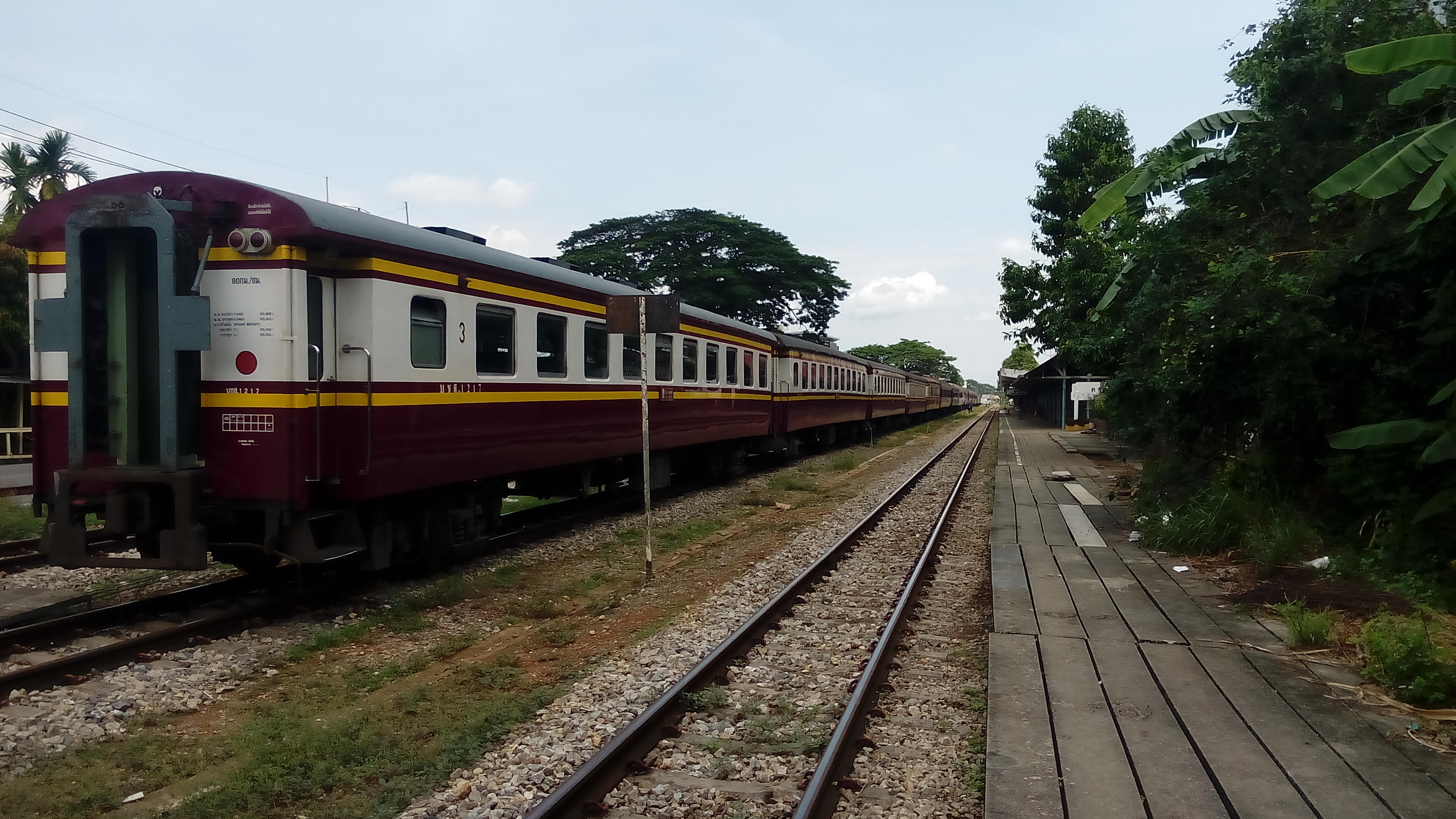
- Passenger cars at Trang railway station

- District location in Trang province
- Coordinates: 7°33′30″N 99°36′36″E
- Country: Thailand
- Province: Trang

Area
  - Total: 548.6 km^{2} (211.8 sq mi)

Population (6 November 2002)
  - Total: 147,034
  - Density: 268/km^{2} (690/sq mi)
- Time zone: UTC+7 (ICT)
- Postal code: 92000
- Geocode: 9201
- Website: www.mueangtrang.dopatrang.go.th

Mueang Trang (Thai: เมืองตรัง, pronounced [mɯ̄a̯ŋ trāŋ]), also Mueang Thap Thiang (Thai: เมืองทับเที่ยง), is the capital district (amphoe mueang) of Trang province, Thailand. The city (thesaban nakhon) has a population of 59,637 (2005) and covers tambon Thap Thiang of Mueang Trang District.

== History ==
Mueang Trang or the previous name Thap Thiang, became the capital district of Trang province in 1915, when the capital was moved inland from Kantang, which was prone to flooding.

== Geography ==
Neighboring districts are (from the south clockwise): Na Yong, Yan Ta Khao, Kantang, Sikao, Wang Wiset, Huai Yot of Trang Province; and Si Banphot of Phatthalung province.

== Administration ==
The district is divided into 15 sub-districts (tambons), which are further subdivided into 118 villages (mubans). The city (thesaban nakhon) Trang covers tambon Thap Thiang. The township (thesaban tambon) Khlong Teng covers parts of tambon Na Tham Nuea. There are a further 14 tambon administrative organizations (TAO).

No.	Name	Thai name	Villages	Pop.
1.	Thap Thiang	ทับเที่ยง	-	59,637
4.	Na Phala	นาพละ	10	3,382
5.	Ban Khuan	บ้านควน	6	3,928
6.	Na Bin La	นาบินหลา	6	3,381
7.	Khuan Pring	ควนปริง	6	7,603
8.	Na Yong Tai	นาโยงใต้	8	4,537
9.	Bang Rak	บางรัก	6	3,917
10.	Khok Lo	โคกหล่อ	12	10,557
13.	Na To Ming	นาโต๊ะหมิง	6	4,809
14.	Nong Trut	หนองตรุด	9	5,482
15.	Nam Phut	น้ำผุด	12	9,683
17.	Na Ta Luang	นาตาล่วง	6	5,843
18.	Ban Pho	บ้านโพธิ์	10	8,360
19.	Na Tham Nuea	นาท่ามเหนือ	13	10,509
20.	Na Tham Tai	นาท่ามใต้	8	5,406

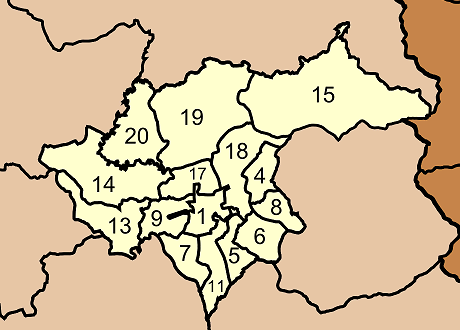

Missing numbers are tambons which now form Na Yong District.

== Economics ==
Na Muen Si village in tambon Na Yong is the home of the Na Muen Si Woven Cloth Community Enterprise. The group of mostly elderly women has resurrected the village's ancient art of weaving. The collective weaves 39 patterns using 10 traditional looms along with ki kratuk shuttle looms. In 2014, the Na Muen Si Woven Cloth Museum opened with the financial support of local authorities and the Central Group. The museum exhibits about 100 traditional fabrics donated by the elders of the village and also newly woven cloth that exhibits its 32 original patterns.

== Notable people ==
- Chuan Leekpai – politician
- Arkhom Chenglai – boxer who won 1992 Summer Olympics bronze medal
