= Kantang railway station =

Railway station in Thailand

Coordinates: 7.4111°N 99.5148°E

Kantang กันตัง
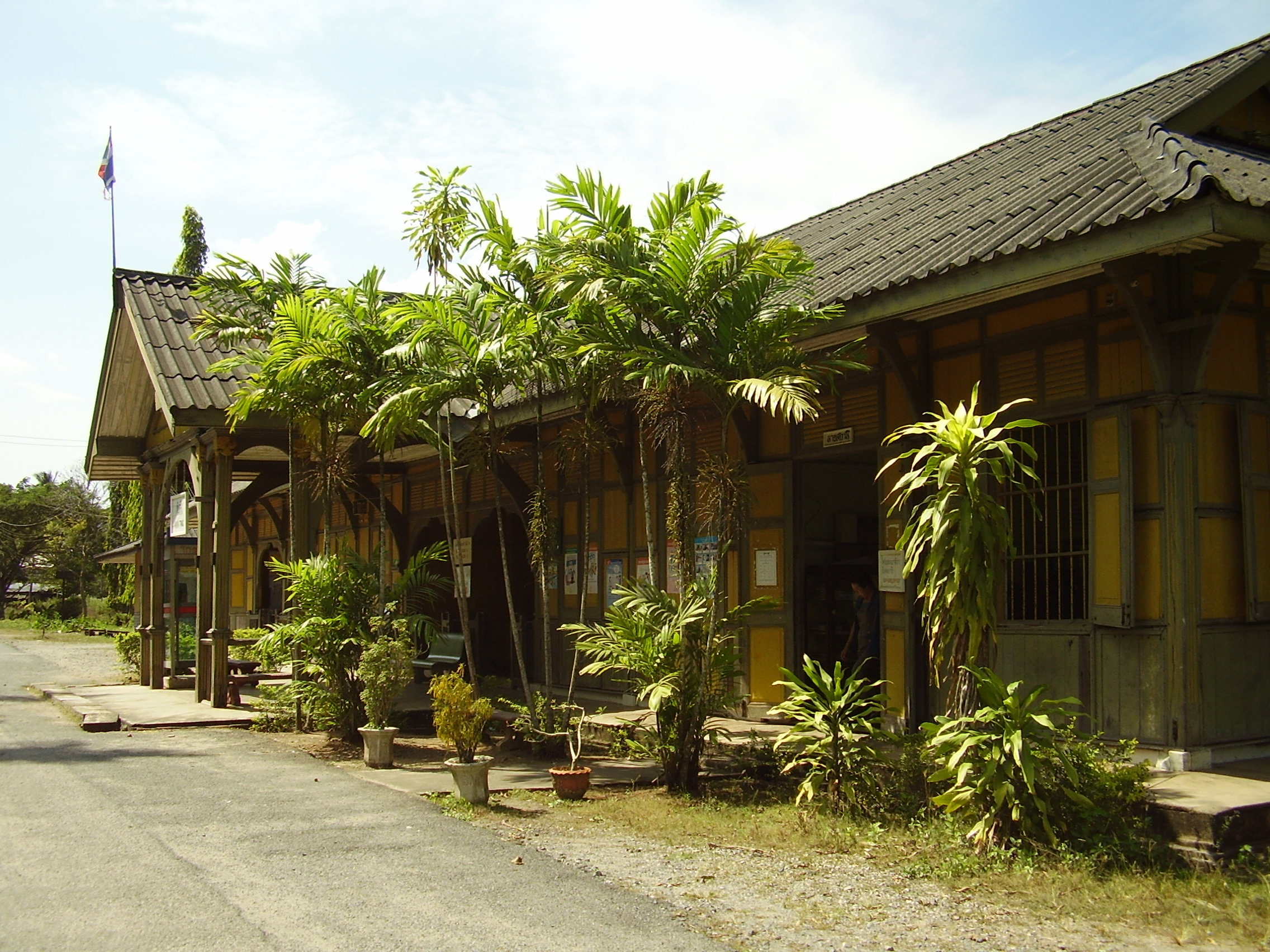

General information
- Location: Na Khai Road, Kantang Subdistrict, Kantang District, Trang; Trang Province; Thailand
- Operator: State Railway of Thailand
- Manager: Ministry of Transport
- Line: Kantang Branch
- Distance: 850.082 km (528.2 mi) from Thon Buri
- Platforms: 1
- Tracks: 3

Construction
- Structure type: At-grade

Other information
- Station code: กต.
- Classification: Class 3

History
- Opened: April 1913
- Former names: Trang

Services
Preceding station	State Railway of Thailand	Following station
Trang towards Thung Song Junction	Southern Line Kantang Branch	Terminus
Location

Kantang railway station is a railway station in Kantang Subdistrict, Kantang District, Trang. A Class 3 station, it is 850.082 km (528.2 mi) from Thon Buri railway station, and is the terminus of the Kantang Branch Line. The station building has not been renovated and retains its original wooden designs. It is divided into two parts: the main building and the verandah (platform). Both are painted mustard yellow with dark brown trim, a distinctive feature of the station. The building houses Love Station, an air-conditioned coffee shop with a photogenic exterior that is popular for photos. Kantang Station's architecture has been preserved and registered with the Fine Arts Department. A formerly modern-style passenger train is permanently exhibited behind the regular tracks and can be seen from the station building as well as by visitors approaching by road.

This station opened in April 1913 for the Southern Line section Huai Yot–Kantang, initially as Trang railway station. The line was extended about 500 metres to Kantang Port so cargo from international trade with Singapore, Malaysia and Indonesia could be transported by rail. That section ceased operations in the 1960s and was dismantled.

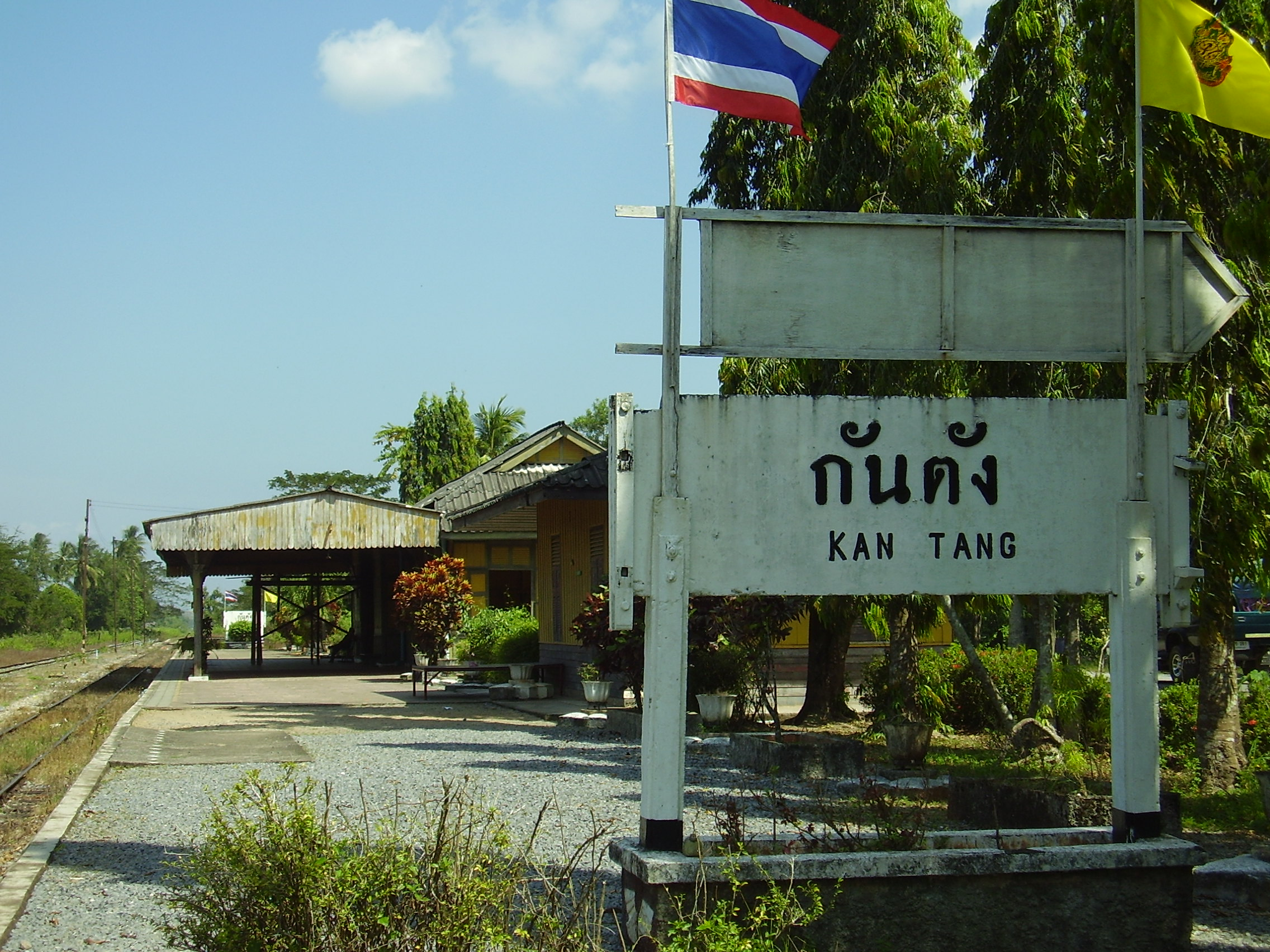
Kantang railway station in 2006

== Train services ==
- Rapid train No. 167 / 168 Krung Thep Aphiwat – Kantang – Krung Thep Aphiwat
