= Trang, Thailand =

Trang ตรัง
- City Municipality
- City of Trang เทศบาลนครตรัง
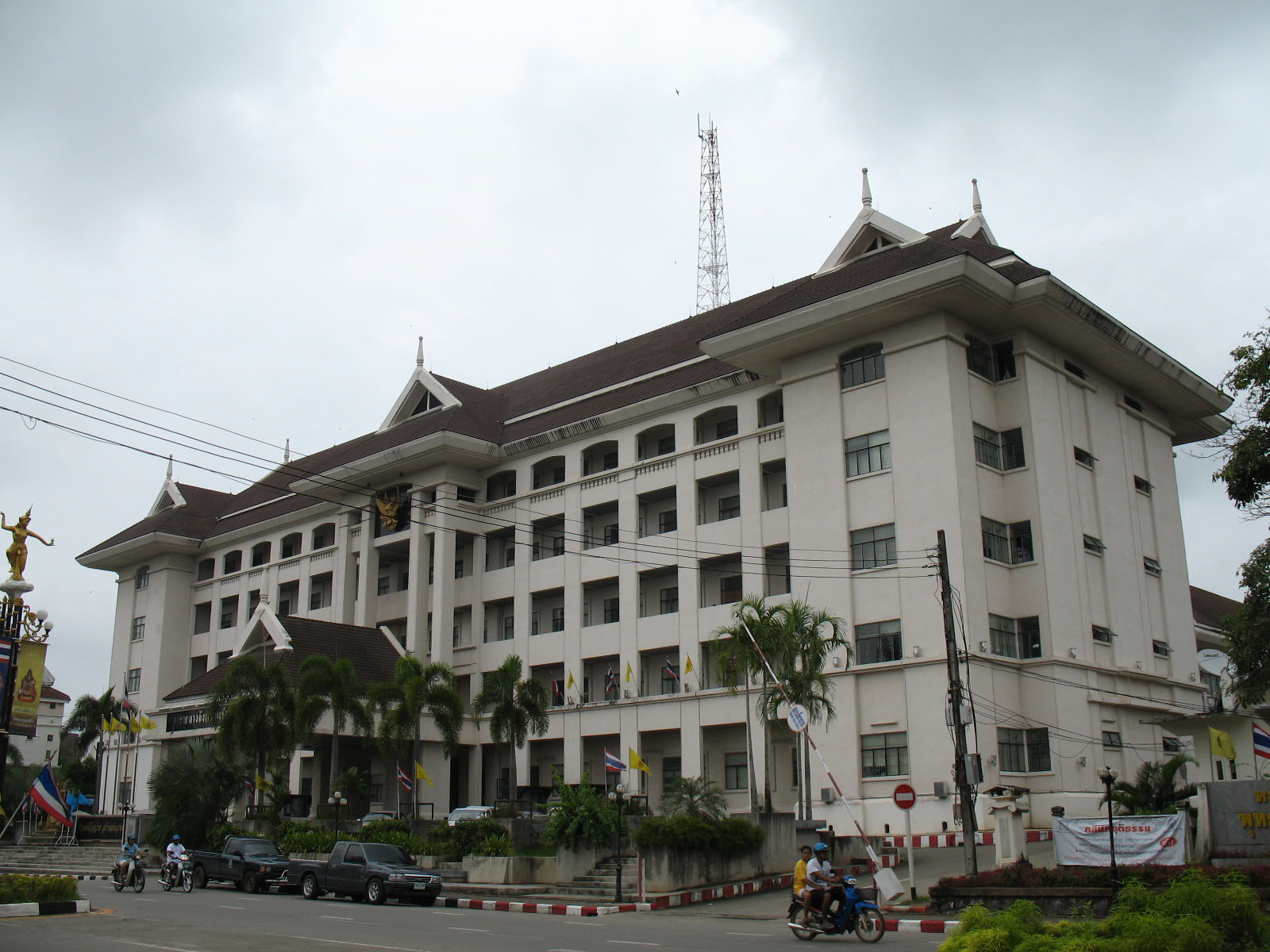
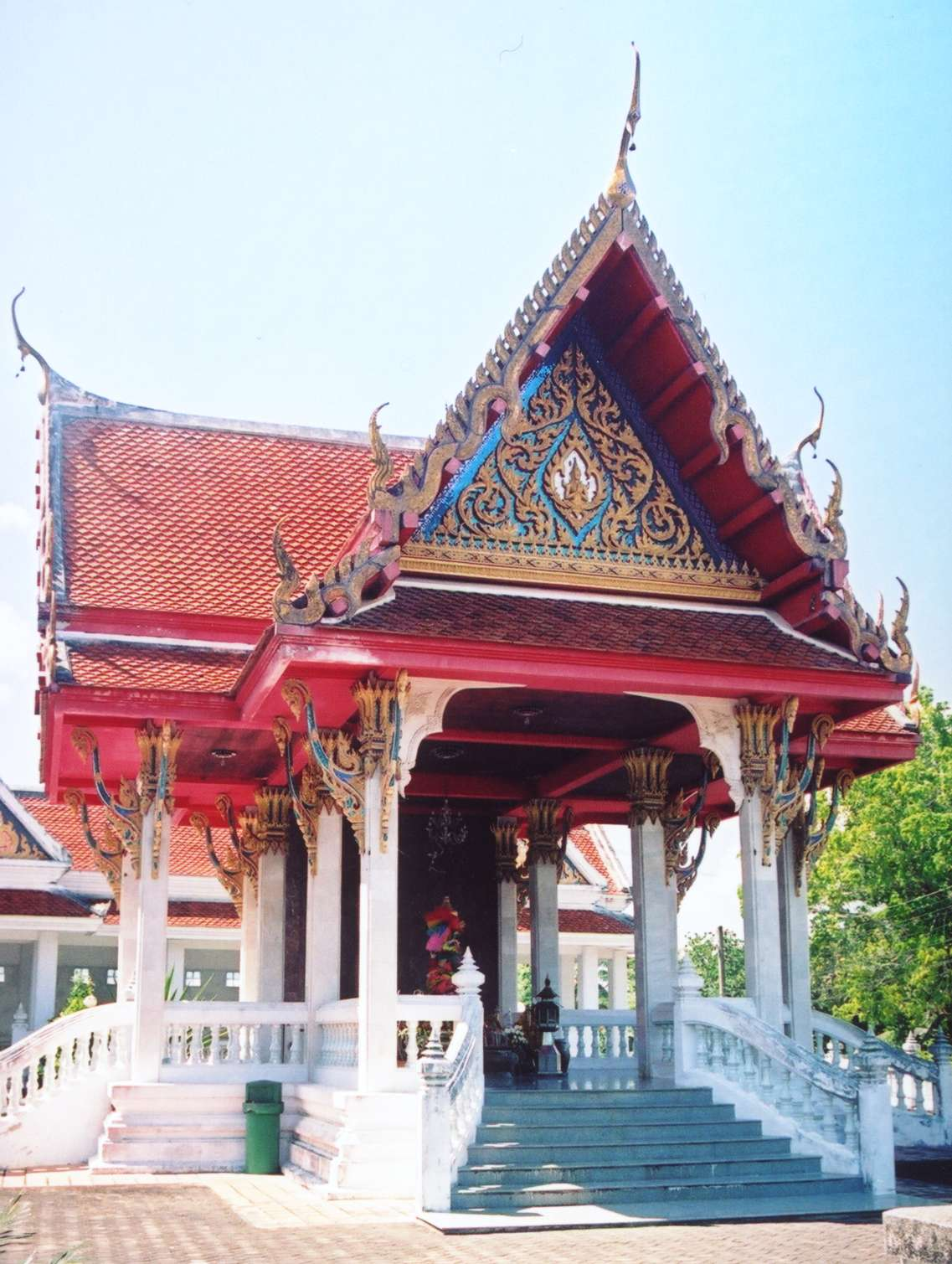
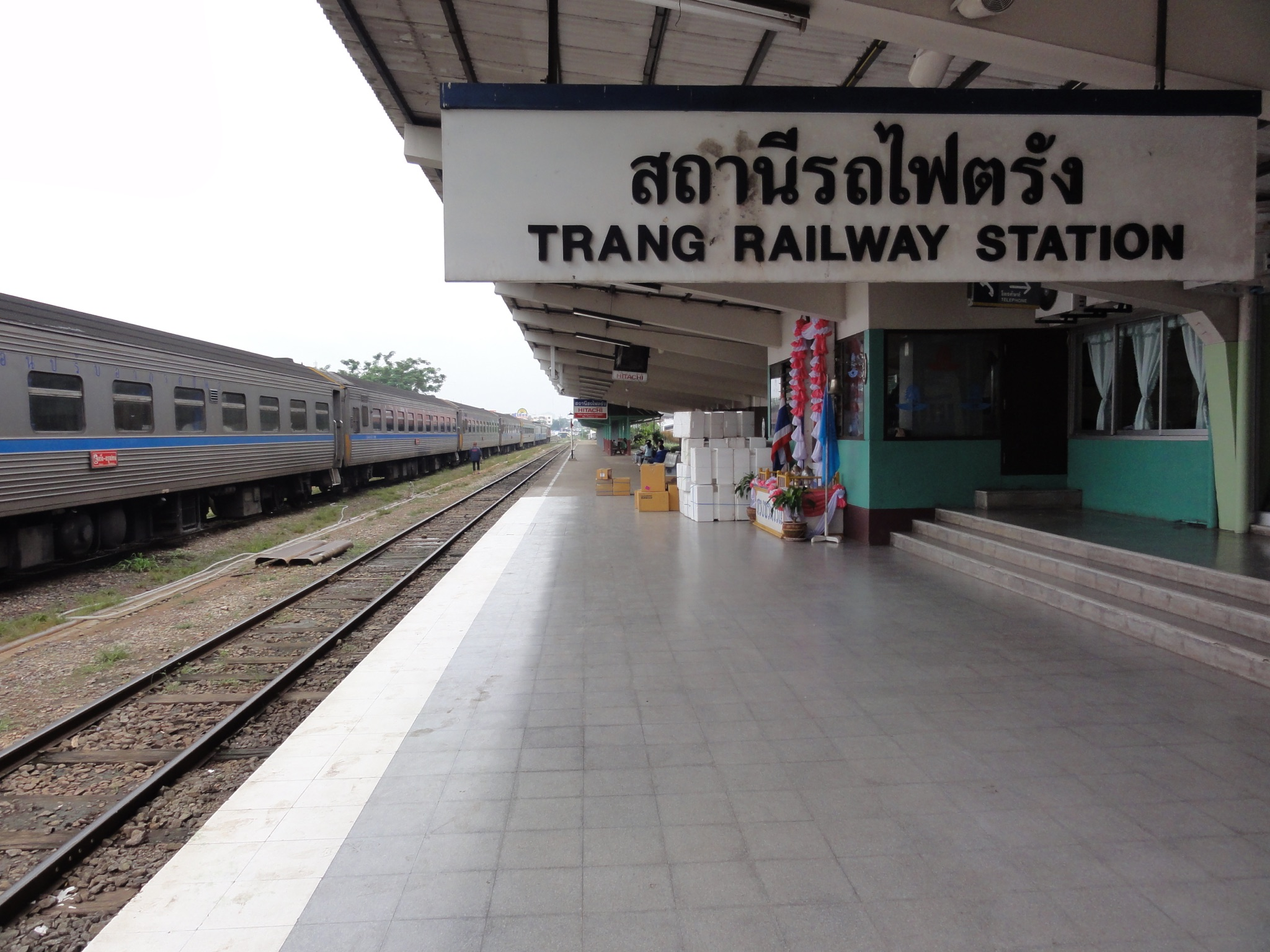
- Trang city hall, City Pillar Shrine of Trang, Trang railway station

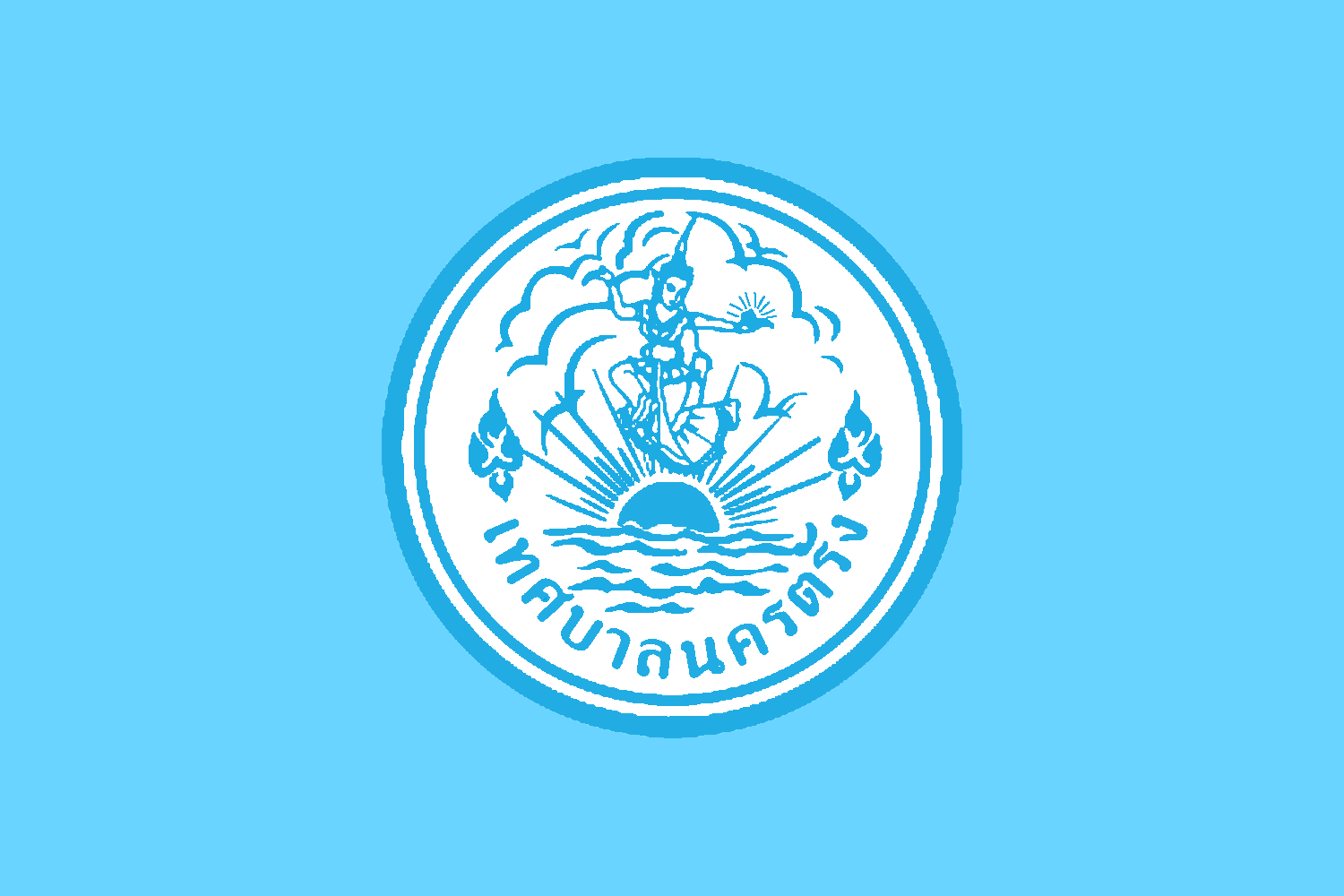
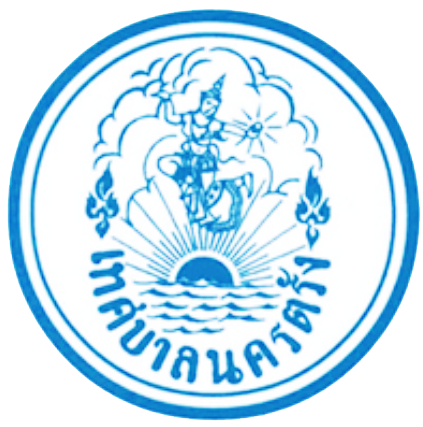
- Flag Seal

- Location in Thailand
- Coordinates: 7°33′27″N 99°36′37″E
- Country: Thailand
- Province: Trang
- District: Mueang Trang

Government
  - Type: City Municipality
  - Mayor: Rak Buncharoen

Area
  - Total: 14.77 km^{2} (5.70 sq mi)

Population (2017)
  - Total: 59,894
  - Density: 4,055/km^{2} (10,500/sq mi)
- Time zone: UTC+7 (ICT)
- Area code: (+66) 75
- Website: trangcity.go.th

Trang (Thai: ตรัง; pronounced [trāŋ]), also called Thap Thiang (ทับเที่ยง), is a city (thesaban nakhon) and the capital of Trang Province, Thailand. The city has a population of 59,637 (2005) and covers the whole tambon Thap Thiang of Mueang Trang district. Trang is 839 km south of Bangkok.

== Geography ==
Trang lies on the Trang River, roughly halfway between the Tenasserim Hills and the coast of the Andaman Sea.

== Climate ==
Trang has a tropical monsoon climate (Köppen climate classification Am). At just 8°N, the temperature in Trang is sees little variation throughout the year, although the pre-monsoon months from February to April are a little hotter in the daytime. The year is divided into a short dry season, from January to February, and a long wet season from March to December, with the heaviest rain in September. There is still some rain, however, in the dry season.

Climate data for Trang (1991–2020, extremes 1951-present)
Month	Jan	Feb	Mar	Apr	May	Jun	Jul	Aug	Sep	Oct	Nov	Dec	Year
Record high °C (°F)	37.0 (98.6)	40.0 (104.0)	40.5 (104.9)	40.3 (104.5)	39.0 (102.2)	36.8 (98.2)	35.6 (96.1)	35.7 (96.3)	36.5 (97.7)	36.0 (96.8)	35.9 (96.6)	34.9 (94.8)	40.5 (104.9)
Mean daily maximum °C (°F)	32.6 (90.7)	34.2 (93.6)	35.3 (95.5)	35.4 (95.7)	34.0 (93.2)	33.1 (91.6)	32.7 (90.9)	32.6 (90.7)	32.3 (90.1)	32.1 (89.8)	31.5 (88.7)	31.3 (88.3)	33.1 (91.6)
Daily mean °C (°F)	27.0 (80.6)	27.7 (81.9)	28.3 (82.9)	28.5 (83.3)	28.1 (82.6)	27.7 (81.9)	27.3 (81.1)	27.2 (81.0)	26.9 (80.4)	26.7 (80.1)	26.7 (80.1)	26.5 (79.7)	27.4 (81.3)
Mean daily minimum °C (°F)	22.5 (72.5)	22.3 (72.1)	22.9 (73.2)	23.7 (74.7)	23.9 (75.0)	23.7 (74.7)	23.5 (74.3)	23.5 (74.3)	23.3 (73.9)	23.3 (73.9)	23.3 (73.9)	22.9 (73.2)	23.2 (73.8)
Record low °C (°F)	15.9 (60.6)	15.0 (59.0)	17.9 (64.2)	18.7 (65.7)	20.6 (69.1)	20.2 (68.4)	19.0 (66.2)	19.5 (67.1)	20.0 (68.0)	20.2 (68.4)	17.3 (63.1)	16.2 (61.2)	15.0 (59.0)
Average precipitation mm (inches)	57.3 (2.26)	25.6 (1.01)	101.6 (4.00)	149.0 (5.87)	216.7 (8.53)	214.7 (8.45)	254.4 (10.02)	286.0 (11.26)	287.0 (11.30)	283.3 (11.15)	226.2 (8.91)	152.2 (5.99)	2,254 (88.74)
Average precipitation days (≥ 1.0 mm)	4.6	2.4	6.0	10.0	15.0	14.2	15.4	16.7	17.4	18.9	14.9	10.5	146.0
Average relative humidity (%)	75.9	72.2	74.4	79.1	83.6	84.6	84.9	85.0	86.1	86.9	85.4	81.7	81.7
Mean monthly sunshine hours	198.4	214.7	204.6	183.0	151.9	150.0	114.7	114.7	108.0	111.6	141.0	179.8	1,872.4
Mean daily sunshine hours	6.4	7.6	6.6	6.1	4.9	5.0	3.7	3.7	3.6	3.6	4.7	5.8	5.1
Source 1: World Meteorological Organization
Source 2: Office of Water Management and Hydrology, Royal Irrigation Department (sun 1981–2010)(extremes)

== Transportation ==
The main road through Trang is Phetkasem Road (Route 4), which connects the city to Phatthalung and the border with Malaysia to the south-east, and to Krabi, Phang Nga, Phuket (via Route 402), Ranong, Chumphon, Prachuap Khiri Khan, Phetchaburi, Ratchaburi, and Bangkok to the north.

Trang Railway Station is on a branch (terminating at Kantang of the Southern Line of the State Railway of Thailand.

Trang is served by Trang Airport, seven km from the city. Thai AirAsia, Nok Air and Thai Lion Air provide services to Bangkok from Trang.
