= Thung Song Junction railway station =

Railway station in Thailand

Coordinates: 8.1705°N 99.6795°E

Thung Song Junction ชุมทางทุ่งสง
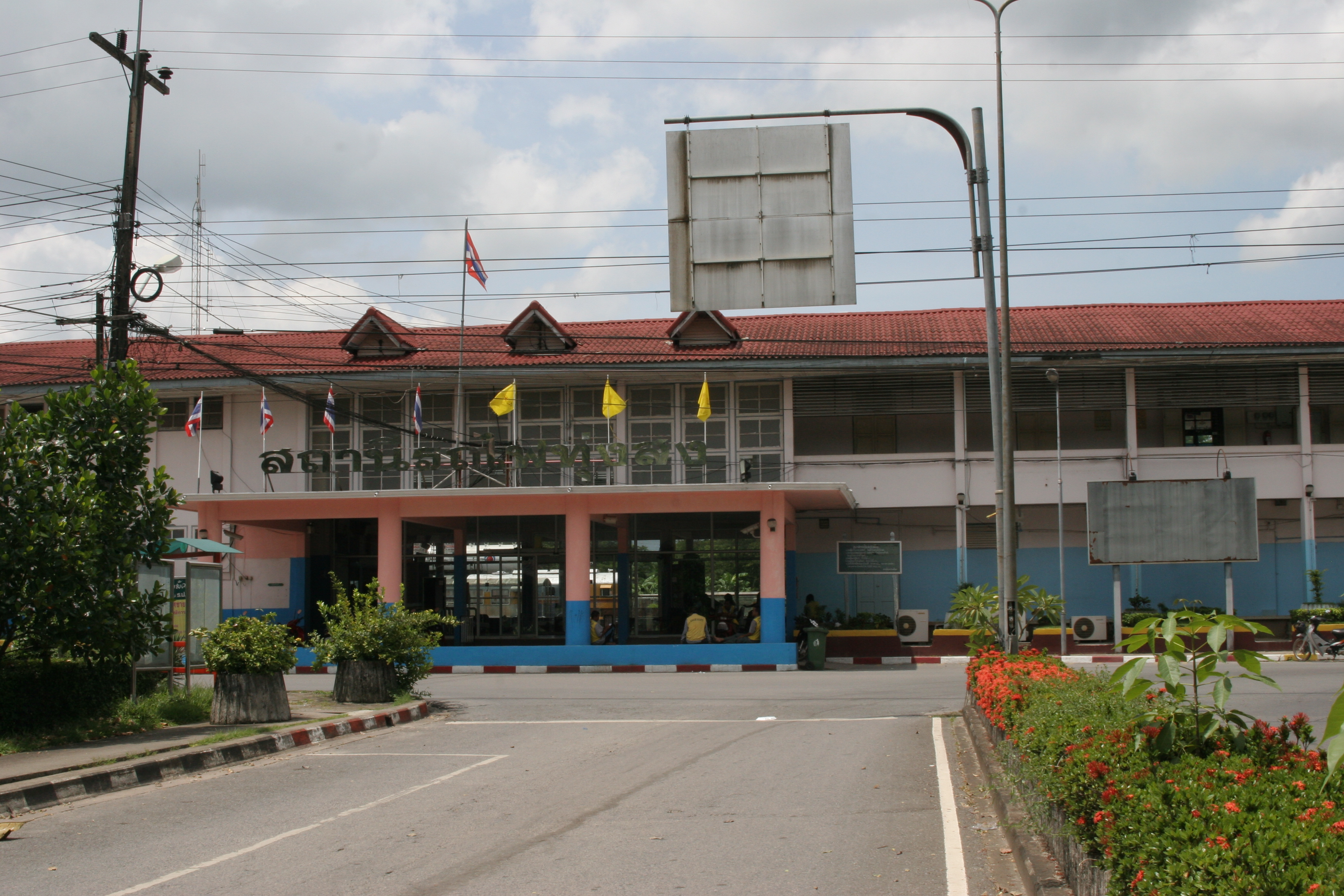
- Thung Song Railway Station in 2013

General information
- Location: Pak Phraek Subdistrict, Thung Song District; Nakhon Si Thammarat Province; Thailand
- Operator: State Railway of Thailand
- Manager: Ministry of Transport
- Lines: Su-ngai Kolok Main Line; Kantang Branch
- Distance: 757.08 km (470.4 mi) from Thon Buri
- Platforms: 3
- Tracks: 8

Construction
- Structure type: Concrete building

Other information
- Station code: ทส.
- Classification: Class 1

History
- Opened: January 1914

Services
Preceding station	State Railway of Thailand	Following station
Ban Ko Pring Halt towards Hua Lamphong or Krung Thep Aphiwat	Southern Line	Sai Yai towards Su-ngai Kolok
Terminus	Southern Line Kantang Branch	Thi Wang towards Kantang
Location

Thung Song Junction railway station is a railway station located in Pak Phraek Subdistrict, Thung Song District, Nakhon Si Thammarat. This station is a class 1 railway station, located 757.08 km (470.4 mi) from Thon Buri railway station. This station is the junction for the Southern Line mainline and the Kantang Branch Line to Trang Province. On site, there is a 277 class decommissioned steam locomotive, built by Hanomag.

The station opened in January 1914, on the Southern Line section Huai Yot–Thung Song Junction. In October 1914, the line extended southwards to Phatthalung, and in February 1915, the line extended northbound to Ban Na.
