= Trang province =

Coordinates: 7°33′29″N 99°36′42″E

Trang ตรัง (Thai) trāŋ (Thai) Terang (Malay)
- Province

Other transcription(s)
  - Malay: Terang (Rumi)
  - Southern Thai: ตรัง (pronounced [traŋ˨˩˦˥˧]) ทับเที่ยง (pronounced [tʰáp̚.tʰîǎːŋ])
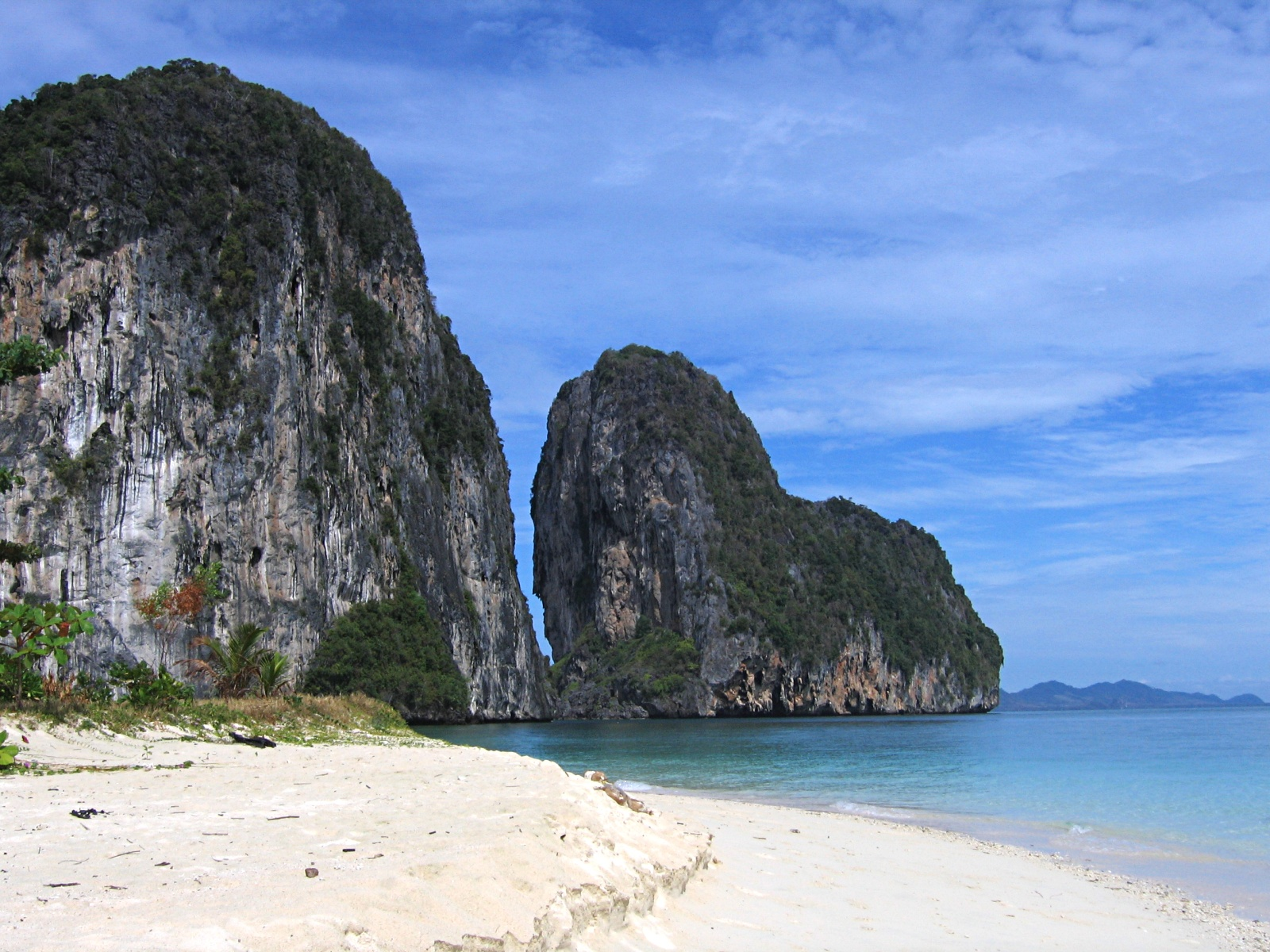
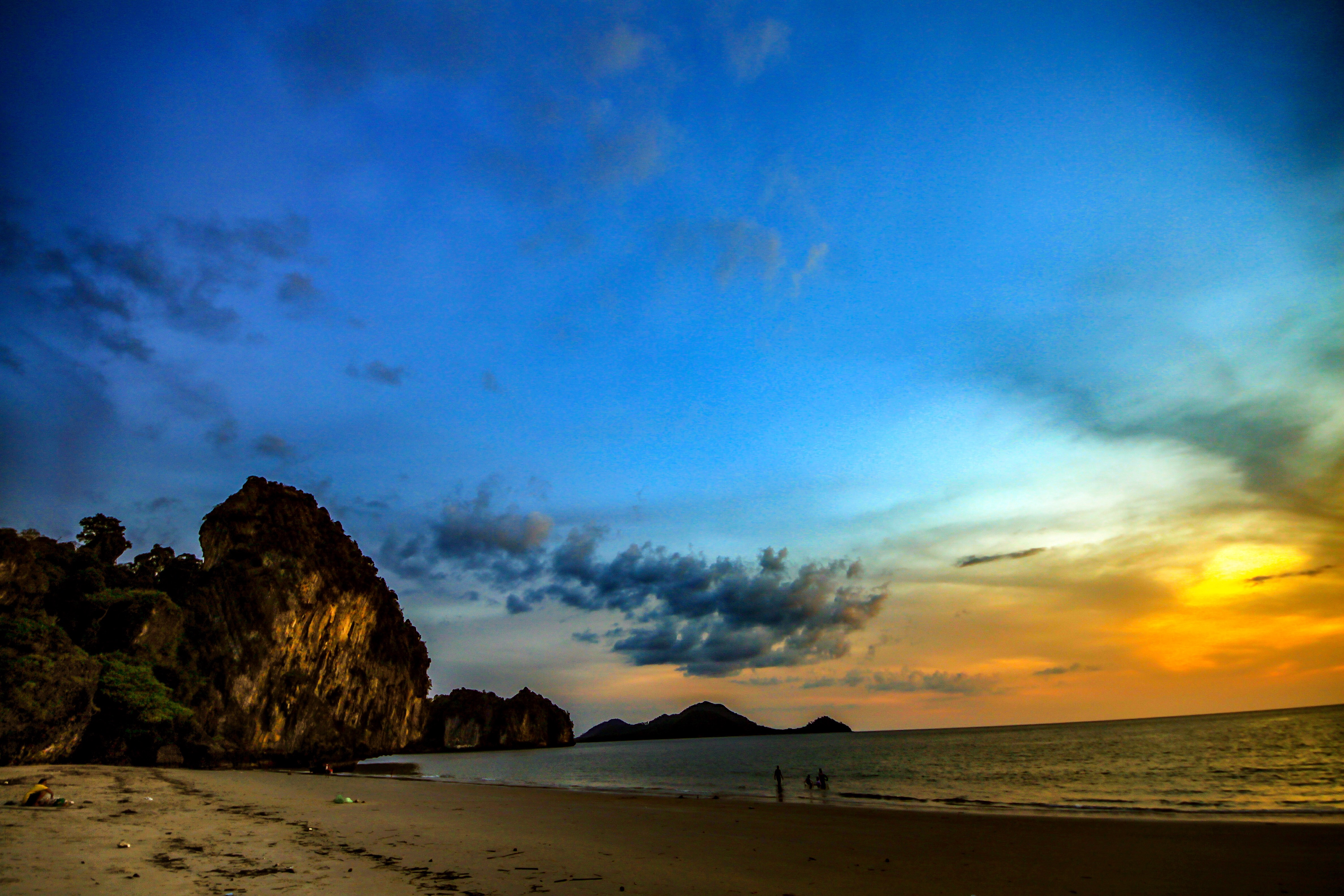
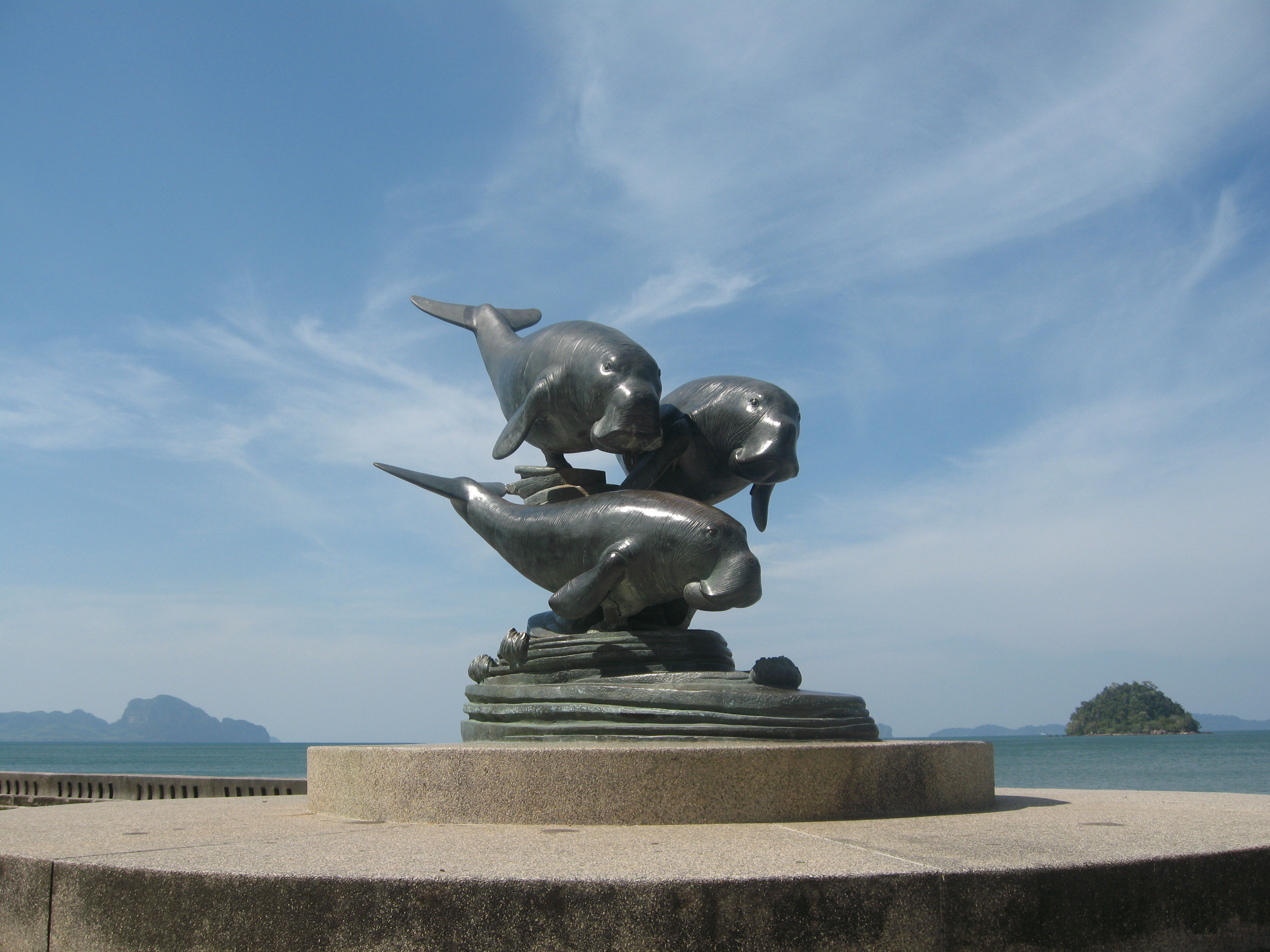
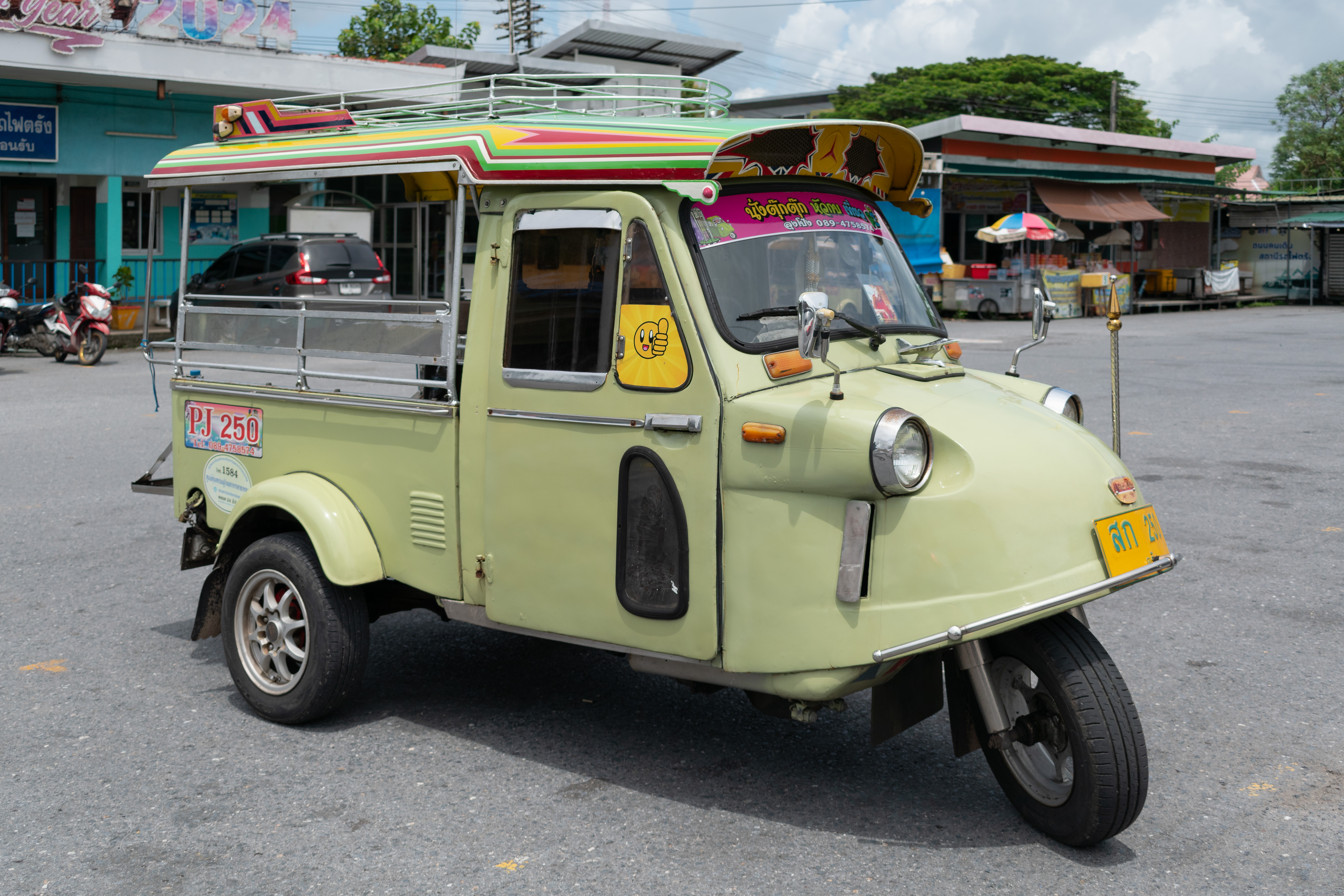
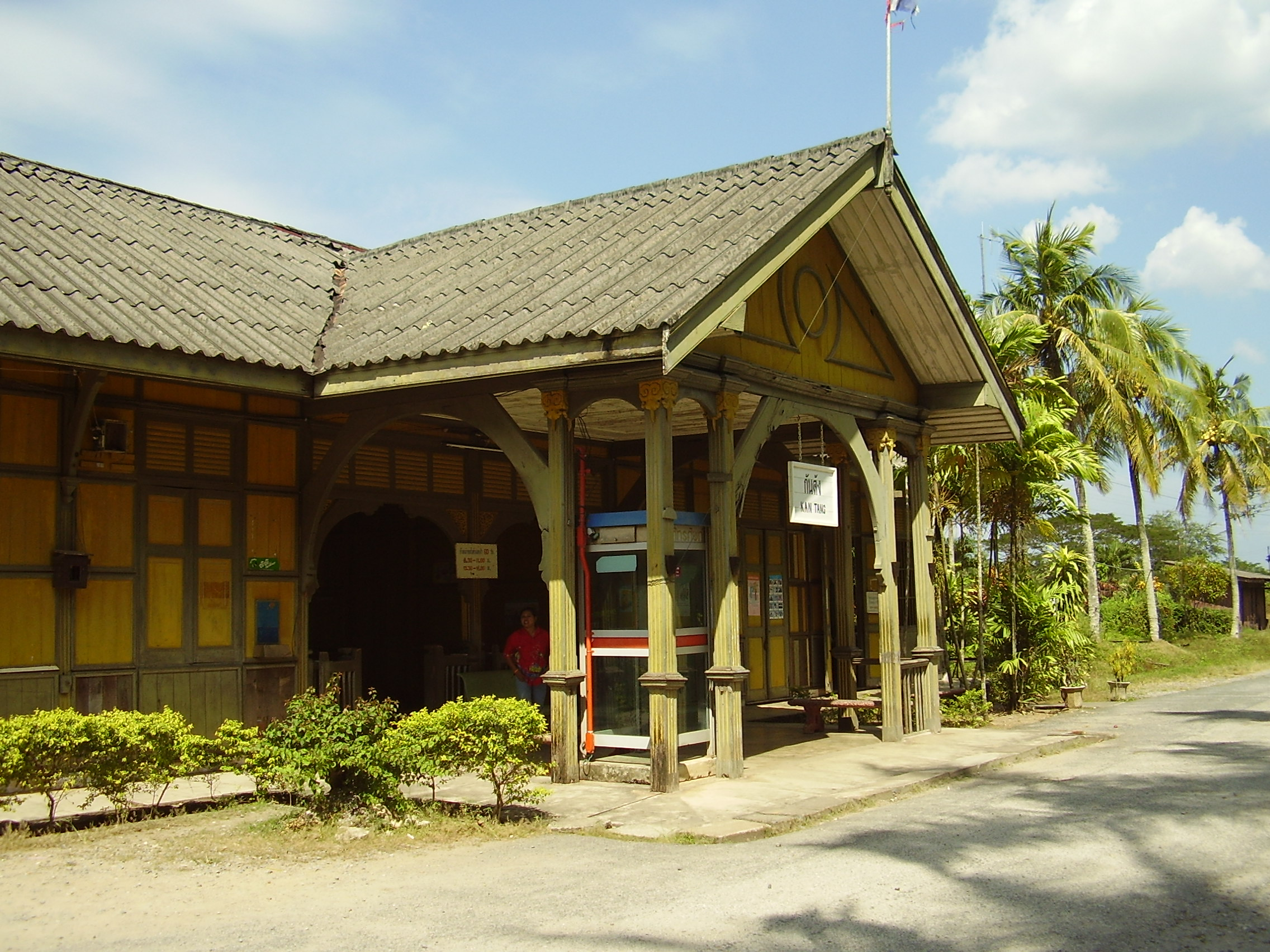
- Ko Lao Liang Phi in Mu Ko Phetra National Park Hat Chao Mai National Park at sunset Dugongs statue at Pak Meng Beach Tuk-tuk hua kob (frog-headed auto rickshaw) unique vehicle of the province Kantang railway station, the stop of Andaman line

- Flag Seal
- Motto: ชาวตรังใจกว้าง สร้างแต่ความดี ("The generous people of Trang, to create only good.")
- Map of Thailand highlighting Trang province
- Country: Thailand
- Capital: Trang

Government
  - Governor: Songklot Sawangwong

Area
  - Total: 4,726 km^{2} (1,825 sq mi)
  - Rank: 46th

Population (2024)
  - Total: 634,959
  - Rank: 41st
  - Density: 134/km^{2} (350/sq mi)
  - Rank: 32nd

Human Achievement Index
  - HAI (2022): 0.6481 "somewhat high" Ranked 29th

GDP
  - Total: baht 73 billion (US$2.1 billion) (2019)
- Time zone: UTC+7 (ICT)
- Postal code: 92xxx
- Calling code: 075
- ISO 3166 code: TH-92
- Website: trang.go.th

Trang Provincial Administrative Organization องค์การบริหารส่วนจังหวัดตรัง
- Provincial Administrative Organization
- Interactive map of Trang Provincial Administrative Organization

Government
  - Type: Local administrative divisions
  - Body: Trang Provincial Administrative Organization
  - President: Bunleng Losathapornphiphit
- Website: trangpao.go.th

Trang (Thai: ตรัง, Thai pronunciation: [trāŋ]; Malay: Terang), also called Mueang Thap Thiang, is one of the southern provinces (changwat) of Thailand, on the west side of the Malay Peninsula facing the Strait of Malacca. Neighboring provinces are (from north clockwise) Krabi, Nakhon Si Thammarat, Phatthalung, and Satun.

Trang was formerly a port involved in foreign trade. It was the first place where rubber was planted in Thailand. Phraya Ratsadanupradit Mahison Phakdi brought rubber saplings from Malaya and planted them here in 1899, and rubber is now an important export of the country. The Trang River flows through the province from its origin in the Khao Luang mountain range, and the Palian River flows from the Banthat mountains. The province of Trang has an area of approximately 5,000 square km and 199 km of Strait of Malacca shoreline.

== History ==
Trang was an important seaport in southern Thailand. Legend says that ships always arrived in the morning, which led to the town's name. "Trang" derives from the Malay word for light or dawn (terang). But in another explanation it says that it comes from Sanskrit (tarangque) which means wave or gallop. In addition, the landscape of Trang is characterized by mounds interspersed with plains that look like waves. Thus, the provincial seal features sea waves and a lighthouse bridge.

The province was once a part of the Srivijaya empire, an ancient Hindu-Buddhist Melayu Kingdom and the Malay Sultanate of Kedah until 1810.

A cave at Khao Nui in Huai Yot district has yielded material of three widely separated periods. The earliest is Neolithic potsherds and animal bone of about 2000 to 500 BCE. Votive tablets of the 7th and 8th centuries follow, one type inscribed in Sanskrit with the Four Truths and another with the Pāli ye dhamma formula, and further tablets belong to the 12th and 13th centuries. Human remains of Australo-Melanesian type from Sakai cave in the province have been dated to between 10,000 and 5,000 years before the present.

According to cultural records Trang was one of 12 satellite towns that existed about 900 years ago, but it was during the reign of King Rama II in 1811 that Trang got its first governor. The first Westerner to arrive in Trang was Captain James Low, who came in 1824 to negotiate commercial benefits.

The original town was in Khuanthani (now a tambon in Kantang district). In 1893, the governor, Phraya Ratsadanupradit Mahison Phakdi, also known as Khaw Sim Bee na Ranong, decided to make Trang an important seaport and relocated the town to Kantang district on the Trang River delta. It was moved again to its present location 26 km inland in 1916 by King Rama VI because of repeated flooding.

Trang was the first area of Thailand where rubber trees were planted, brought there by governor Phraya Ratsadanupradit Mahison Phakdi from British Malaya in 1899.

== Symbols ==
The seal of the province shows a lighthouse bridge above a sea of waves. The lighthouse bridge refers to Trang as a seaport trading with foreign countries.

The provincial symbolic flower and tree is the green ebony (Jacaranda filicifolia). The plant was imported from Australia by the same governor who imported the rubber tree, and it quickly got the name "si trang" by the citizens.

Trang's streams and waterfalls are habitat to the lambchop rasbora (Trigonostigma espei), the minnow that are popularly kept as ornamental fish, Some of the population is the wild caught, and on the ground, this species of fish is the provincial aquatic life.

The provincial slogan เมืองพระยารัษฏา ชาวประชาใจกว้าง หมูย่างรสเลิศ ถิ่นกำเนิดยางพารา เด่นสง่าดอกศรีตรัง ปะการังใต้ทะเล เสน่ห์หาดทรายงาม น้ำตกสวยตระการตา translates as "Phraya Rasda's town, generous people, delicious roast pork, the first city where para rubber was planted, the Si Trang provincial flower, underwater coral reefs, scenic beaches and waterfalls."

== Geography ==
The province is on the coast of the Strait of Malacca, and contains 46 islands together with the mainland area. There are only few plains, and most of the area is hills. The Khao Luang and the Banthat mountain range are the sources of the two main rivers of the province, the Trang River and the Palian River.

The southern coast of the province is protected in the Mu Ko Phetra National Park. The estuary of the Trang River together with the Hat Chao Mai Marine National Park and Ko Libong Non-hunting Area are also registered Ramsar wetlands. The total forest area is 1,093 km^{2} (422 sq mi) or 23.1 percent of provincial area.

=== National parks ===
There are a total of three national parks, two of which, along with eighteen other national parks, make up region 5 (Nakhon Si Thammarat) and Khao Pu–Khao Ya is in region 6 (Songkhla) of Thailand's protected areas. (Visitors in Fiscal year 2024).

Khao Pu–Khao Ya National Park	694 km^{2} (268 sq mi)	(87,155)
Mu Ko Phetra National Park	494 km^{2} (191 sq mi)	(154,285)
Hat Chao Mai National Park	231 km^{2} (89 sq mi)	(159,608)

=== Wildlife sanctuary ===
There are two wildlife sanctuaries in region 6 (Songkhla), of which one is in Trang province.

Khao Banthat Wildlife Sanctuary 1,267 km^{2} (489 sq mi)

=== Non-hunting areas ===
There are a total of nine non-hunting areas in region 5 (Nakhon Si Thammarat), of which three are in Trang province.

Mu Ko Libong	447 km^{2} (173 sq mi)
Khlong Lam Chan	54 km^{2} (21 sq mi)
Khao Nam Phrai	21 km^{2} (8.1 sq mi)

Location protected areas of Trang

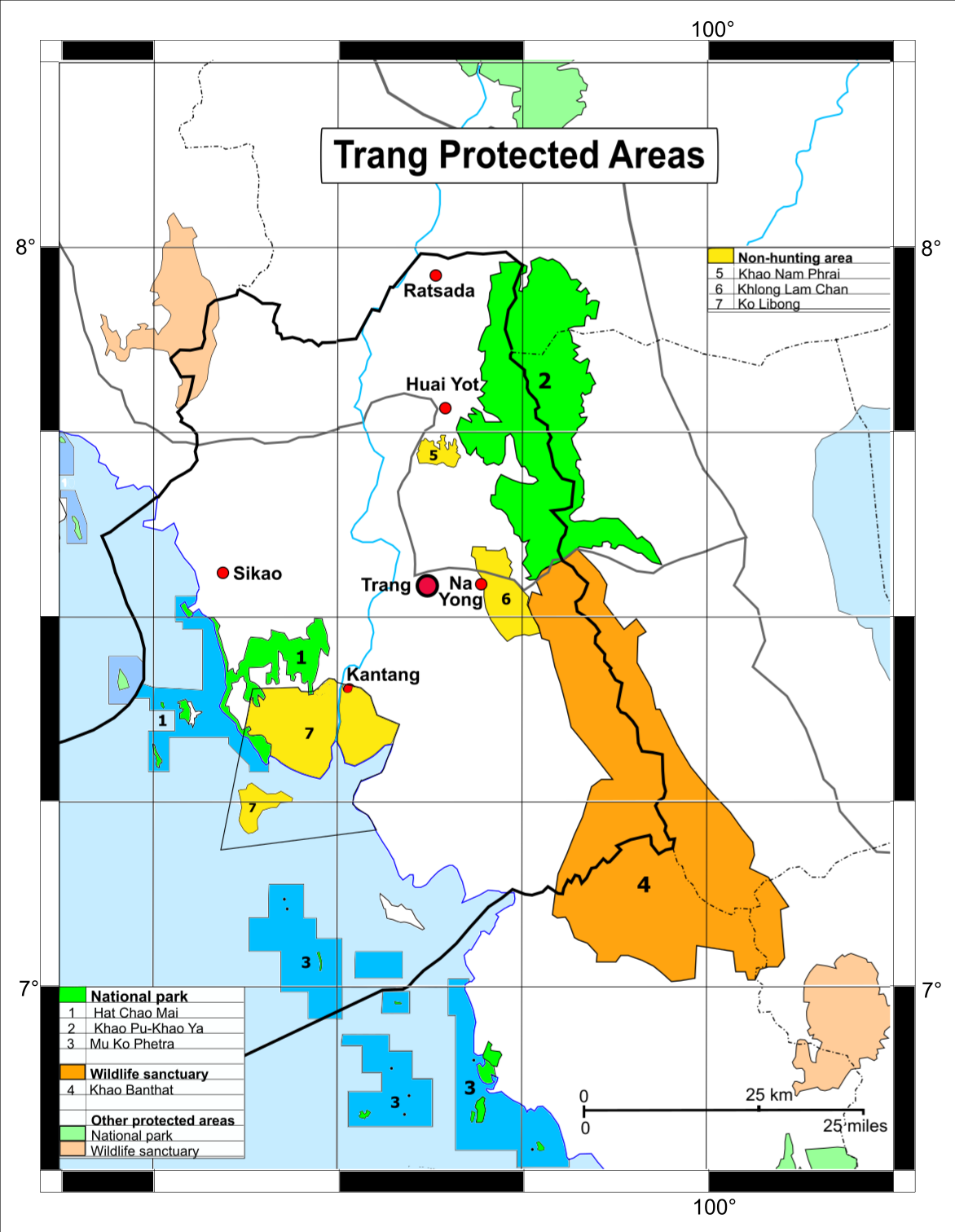
Trang protected areas

	National park
1	Hat Chao Mai
2	Khao Pu-Khao Ya
3	Mu Ko Phetra

	Wildlife sanctuary
4	Khao Banthat

	Non-hunting area
5	Khao Nam Phrai
6	Khlong Lam Chan
7	Mu Ko Libong

== Administrative divisions ==
=== Provincial government ===
Trang is divided into 10 districts (amphoes). These are further divided into 87 subdistricts (tambons) and 697 villages (mubans).

Map	Number	Name	Thai	Malay	Jawi
	1	Mueang Trang	เมืองตรัง	Bandaraya Terang	بنداراي ترڠ
	2	Kantang	กันตัง	Gantang	ݢنتڠ
	3	Yan Ta Khao	ย่านตาขาว	Janda Puteh	جندا ڤوتيه
	4	Palian	ปะเหลียน	Tanjong Setar	تنجوڠ ستر
	5	Sikao	สิเกา	Siku	سيکو
	6	Huai Yot	ห้วยยอด	Gunung Puteh	ݢونوڠ ڤوتيه
	7	Wang Wiset	วังวิเศษ	Istana Sumurung	ايستان سوموروڠ
	8	Na Yong	นาโยง	Sawah Berangkai	ساوه برڠکاي
	9	Ratsada	รัษฎา	Zamin	زامين
	10	Hat Samran	หาดสำราญ	Pantai Girang	ڤنتاي ݢيرڠ

=== Local government ===
As of 26 November 2019 there are: one Trang Provincial Administration Organisation (ongkan borihan suan changwat) and 22 municipal (thesaban) areas in the province. Trang has city (thesaban nakhon) status and Kantang has town (thesaban mueang) status. Further there are 20 subdistrict municipalities (thesaban tambon). The non-municipal areas are administered by 77 Subdistrict Administrative Organisations - SAO (ongkan borihan suan tambon).

== Transportation ==
Air: Trang Airport is 7 km from Trang town centre. It is served by Thailand AirAsia, Thai Lion Air, and Nok Air, with flights to Bangkok.

Rail: Trang is one of the southern destinations offering trains to Krung Thep Aphiwat Central Terminal. Starting from Thung Song Junction railway station in Nakhon Si Thammarat province, this southwestern route has three stations: Huai Yot railway station at Huai Yot District, Trang railway station and ends at Kantang railway station at Kantang railway station.

Road: Major roads to and from Trang are:

1. Highway 4 (Bangkok—Chumphon) via Highway 41 (Surat Thani—Thung Song—Huai Yot—Trang), a distance of 828 kilometres.
2. Highway 4 (Bangkok—Chumphon) via Ranong—Phang Nga—Krabi—Trang, a distance of 1,020 kilometres.
3. Highway 404-416 (Satun—Palian—Trang), 140 kilometres.
4. Highway 4-407 (Hat Yai—Phatthalung—Trang), 148 kilometres.
5. Highway 4-402 (Phuket—Phang Nga—Krabi—Trang), 312 kilometres.

Bus:There are buses to and from Trang to Bangkok and main provinces (Phuket, Hat Yai, Krabi, Nakhon Si Thammarat, and Satun).

Boats to islands: Trang has four piers for boats to the islands: Pak Meng Pier, Ban Chao Mai Pier, Klong Son Pier, and Kuan Thung Kuu Pier.

== Population ==
Trang Province is ethnically and culturally diverse. The province is home to Southern Siamese, Thai Muslims, Peranakans (aka the Baba-Yaya), Thai Chinese (Teochews), and Sea People. Each group has its own traditions, in terms of costumes, cuisines, religions, and more.

The majority of the population in Trang Province is Buddhist, followed by Muslims at 18.5 percent and Christianity at 1.5 percent. There are 129 temples, 65 monasteries, 87 mosques, 10 Christian churches, 19 shrines and monasteries in Trang.

== Education ==
Secondary schools:

- Wichienmatu School วิเชียรมาตุ
- Wichienmatu 2 School วิเชียรมาตุ 2
- Wichienmatu 3 School วิเชียรมาตุ 3
- Saparachinee School สภาราชินี
- Saparachinee 2 School สภาราชินี 2
- Princess Chulabhorn's College, Trang จุฬาภรณ์ราชวิทยาลัย
- Sport School โรงเรียนกีฬาตรัง
- Buranarumluk School บูรณะรำลึก
- Panyawit School ปัญญาวิทย์
- Darunothai School ดรุโณทัย
- Trang Wittaya School ตรังวิทยา
- Trang Christian Suksa School ตรังคริสเตียนศึกษา
- Wat Kaphang Surin School โรงเรียนวัดกระพังสุรินทร์
- Pornsirikul School พรศิริกุล
- Matayomsuksa Watkuanwisetmulaniti School มัธยมศึกษาวัดควนวิเศษ มูลนิธิ
- Kantangpittayakorn School กันตังพิทยากร
- Kantangratsadasuksa School กันตังรัษฎาศึกษา
- Yantakhao Ratchanupatham School ย่านตาขาวรัฐชนูปถัมภ์
- Palean padungsit School ปะเหลียนผดุงศิษย์
- Kantapittayakarn School คันธพิทยาคาร
- Sikao prachapadungvit School สิเกาประชาผดุงวิทย์
- Wangviset School วังวิเศษ
- Huayyot School ห้วยยอด
- Lampurareungvit School ลำภูราเรืองวิทย์
- Nampud School น้ำผุด
- Ratsada School รัษฎา
- Huaynang ratsadornbamrung School ห้วยนางราษฎรบำรุง
- Ratsadanupradit anusorn School รัษฎานุประดิษย์อนุสรณ์
- Nayong vittayakom School นาโยงวิทยาคม
- Sawatratanapimuk School สวัสดิ์รัตนาภิมุข
- Thungnonghang prachason School ทุ่งหนองแห้งประชาสรรค์
- Hatsumran vittayakom School หาดสำราญวิทยาคม
- Trang polytechnic School ตรังโปลีเทคนิค

Higher education:

- Rajamangala University of Technology Srivijaya (Trang campus)
- Prince of Songkla University (Trang campus)
- Ramkhamhaeng University (Trang campus)
- Suan Dusit Rajabhat University (Trang center)
- Boromrajonane College of Nursing
- Sirindhorn College of Public Health
- Trang Technical College
- Trang College of Agricultural and Technology
- Trang Polytechnic College
- Siam Commercial College

== Healthcare ==
- Trang Hospital (main hospital, public)
- Watanapat Hospital (private)
- Trang Ruampat Hospital (private)

== Human achievement index 2022 ==
Health	Education	Employment	Income
54	17	67	61
Housing	Family	Transport	Participation
48	45	6	24
Province Trang, with an HAI 2022 value of 0.6481 is "somewhat high", occupies place 29 in the ranking.

Since 2003, United Nations Development Programme (UNDP) in Thailand has tracked progress on human development at sub-national level using the Human achievement index (HAI), a composite index covering all the eight key areas of human development. National Economic and Social Development Board (NESDB) has taken over this task since 2017.

Rank	Classification
1–13	"High"
14–29	"Somewhat high"
30–45	"Average"
46–61	"Somewhat low"
62–77	"Low"

Map with provinces and HAI 2022 rankings

== Events and festivals ==
- Trang Vegetarian Festival (เทศกาลกินเจ) : Trang is home to a significant Peranakan community, and as a result, the annual Vegetarian Festival in October is celebrated in a way similar to Phuket. For nine days and nights, participants wear white clothing and observe a strict vegetarian diet, believing that this practice brings spiritual merit and good fortune. Trang is recognized as one of the provinces that hosts this festival with great devotion and vibrancy.
- Trang Underwater Wedding Ceremony (พิธีวิวาห์ใต้สมุทร) : This unique wedding event takes place beneath the sea in Trang and was first introduced in 1996. Held annually around Valentine's Day, it has become a signature romantic attraction of the province. Promoted by the Tourism Authority of Thailand (TAT), the ceremony blends traditional Thai customs with the stunning underwater scenery of Trang.
- Marine Pulling Buddha Procession (ชักพระทางทะเล) : Known in Thai as Chak Phra, this Buddhist festival involves placing a Buddha image on a boat and parading it along the waterways as a form of merit-making and to bless the local communities. While Chak Phra is celebrated in various southern provinces such as Surat Thani, Trang is the only province that performs this ritual by sea. The event is held annually after the end of Buddhist Lent, typically in October.

== Local food ==
Trang is another province well-known for its rich culinary culture, earning it the nickname "The Land of Food." Among its many iconic dishes are:

- Mu Yang (commonly referred to by locals as Mu Han): a barbecue-style roasted piglet with crispy skin. Though it's often called Mu Yang, people in Trang usually use the term Mu Han when referring to this dish. Influenced by Cantonese culinary traditions for over a century, it has become one of Trang's most iconic and festive foods.
- Dim Sum: Trang boasts a uniquely local breakfast culture not found elsewhere in Thailand. Numerous kopi tiam (traditional Chinese coffee shops) dot the province, offering a wide variety of morning treats such as patongko (youtiao), khanom jeeb (shumai), har gow (shrimp dumplings), salapao (steamed buns), and popia thot (deep-fried spring rolls), often featuring slices of mu yang as a filling.
- Trang Cake (also known as Kook Ming Cake): a traditional sponge cake originating from Lamphu Ra, 14 km north of Mueang Trang. Baked in a charcoal oven and served without frosting, these cakes come in a range of flavours including orange, coffee, pandan, and a signature "three-flavour" variety.
- Mee Nam Liao: a noodle dish similar in style to rad na or lor mee, but made without bamboo shoots or spring onions. Developed by Trang's Cantonese and Hoklo communities, it has evolved into a distinctive local specialty that can only be found in this province.
- Indonesian Shortfin Eel (locally called Pla Tu Naa): a large marine eel that migrates into freshwater when mature. It's common in the Trang River and prized for its delicious taste, often grilled in foil, cooked in tom yum, or simmered in red sauce.

== Gallery ==
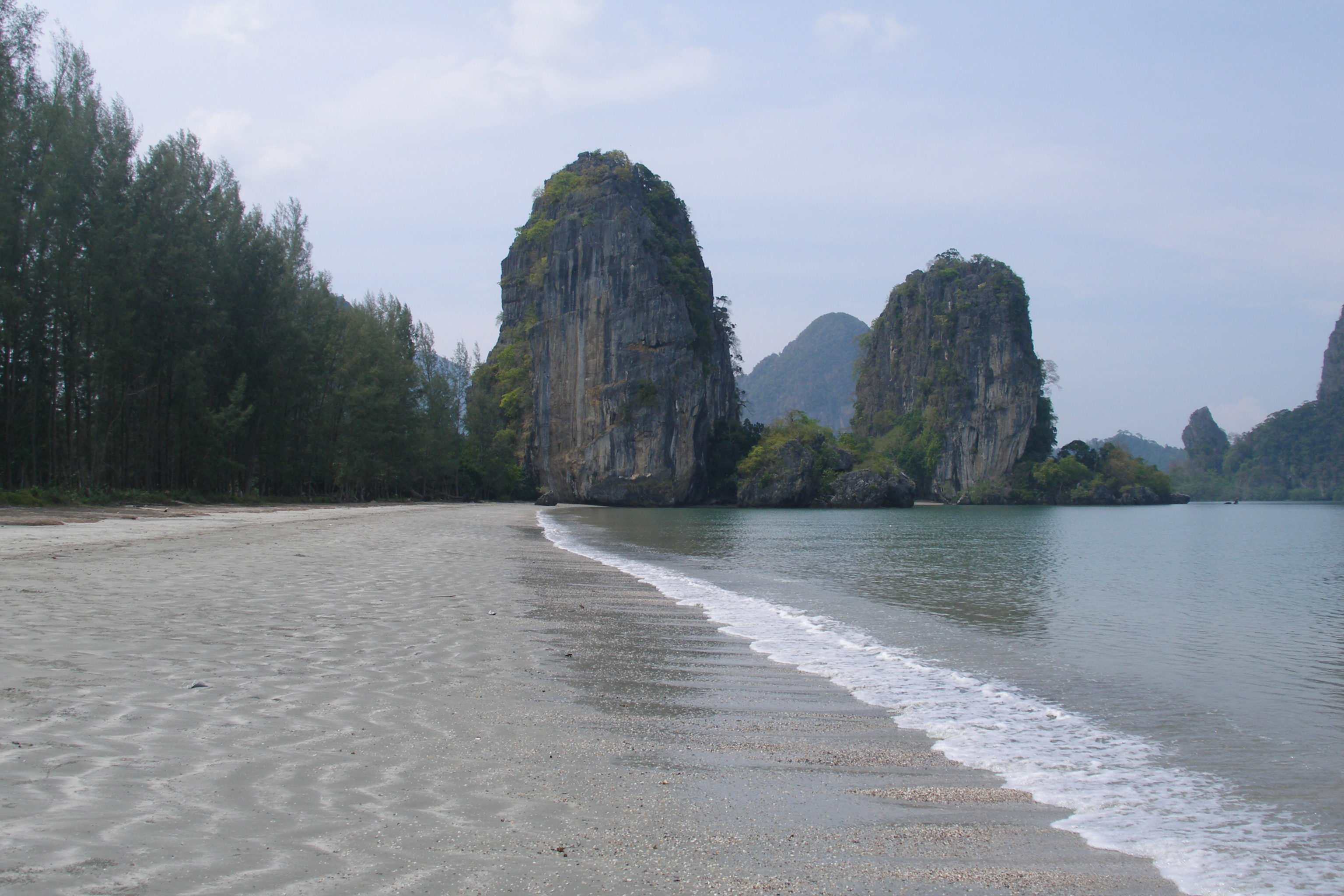
Rajamangala Beach

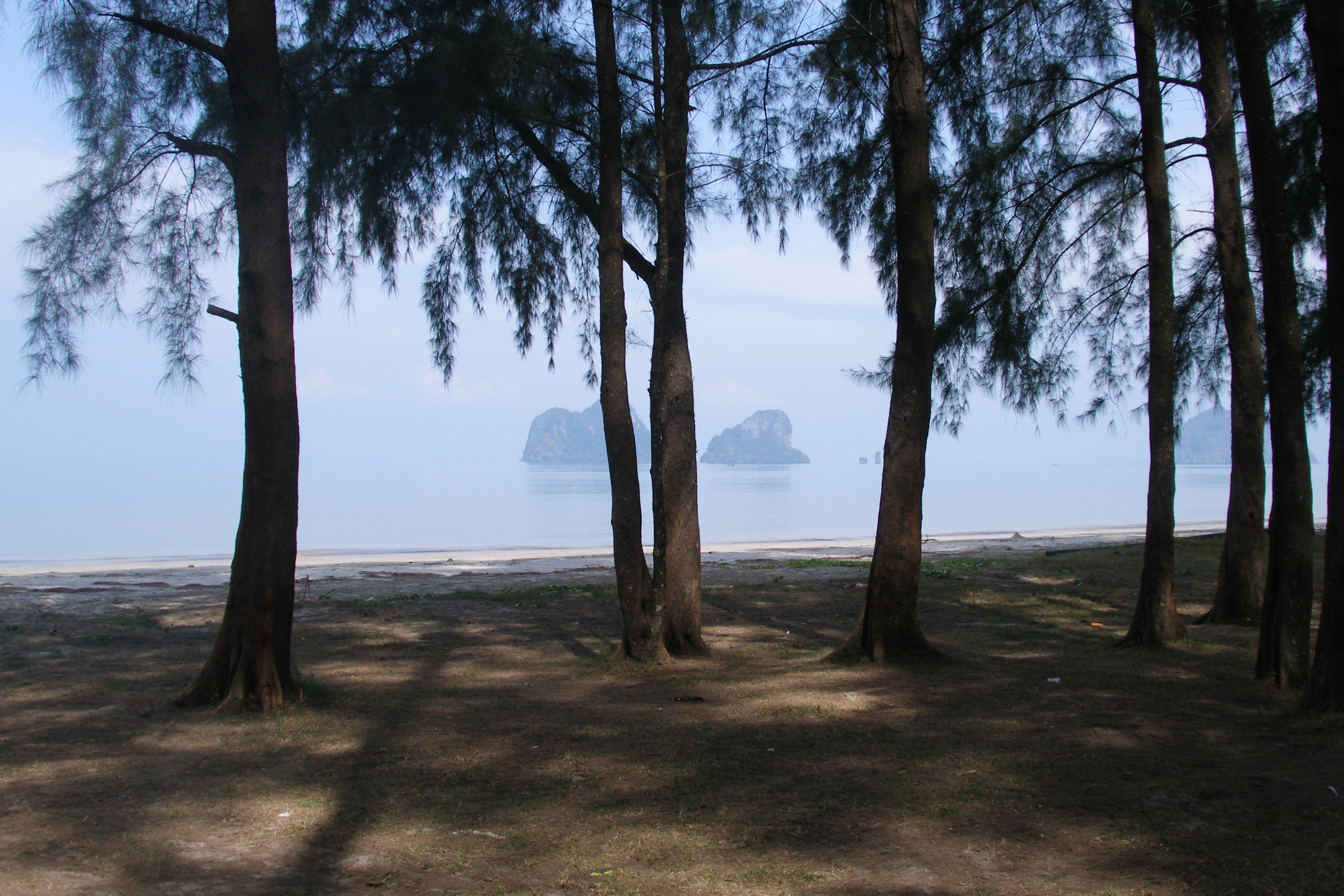
Trees at Rajamangala Beach, Trang coastline

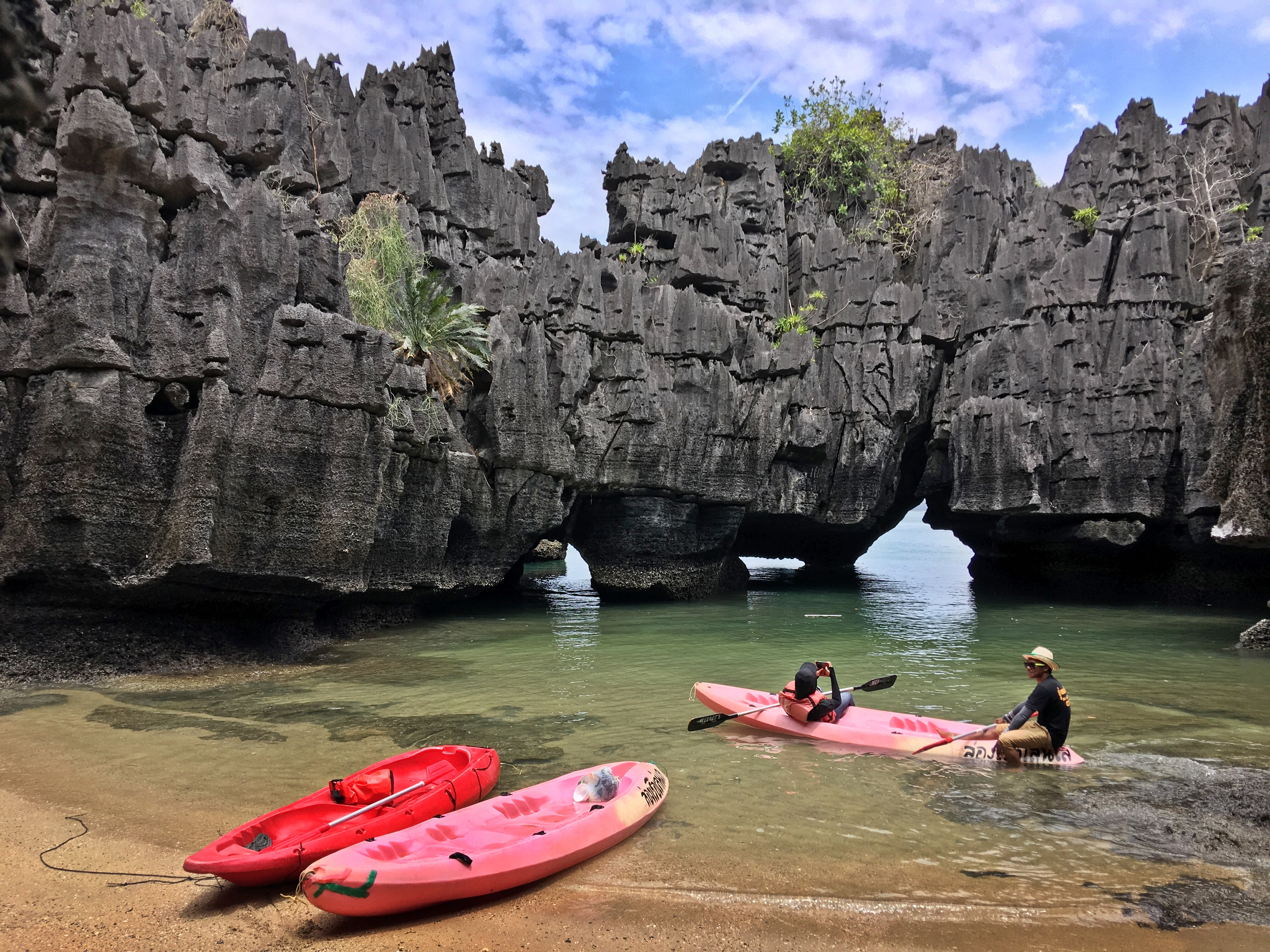
Mu Ko Phetra National Park

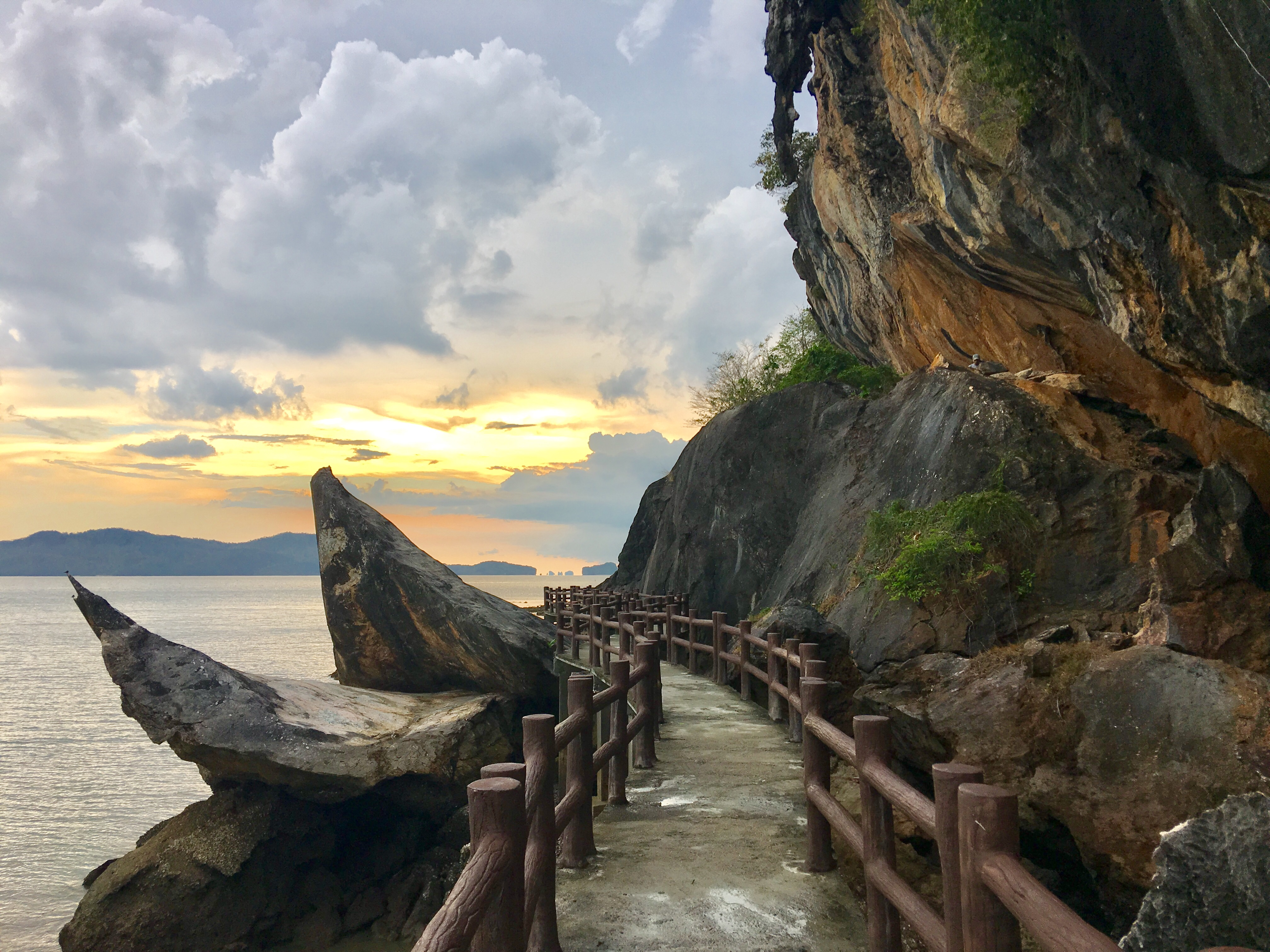
Another corner of Mu Ko Phetra National Park

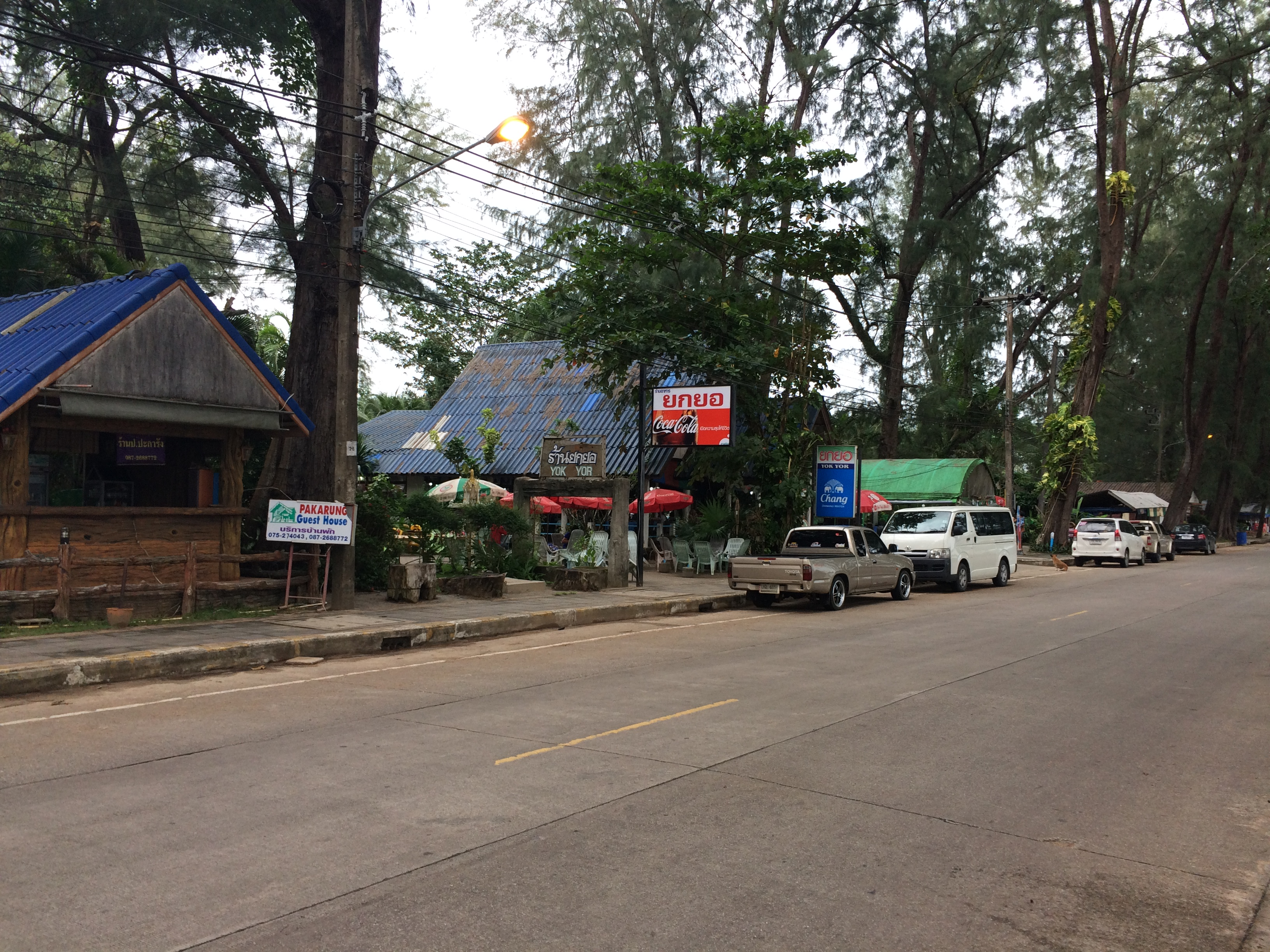
View of Mai Fat, the sub-district of Sikao

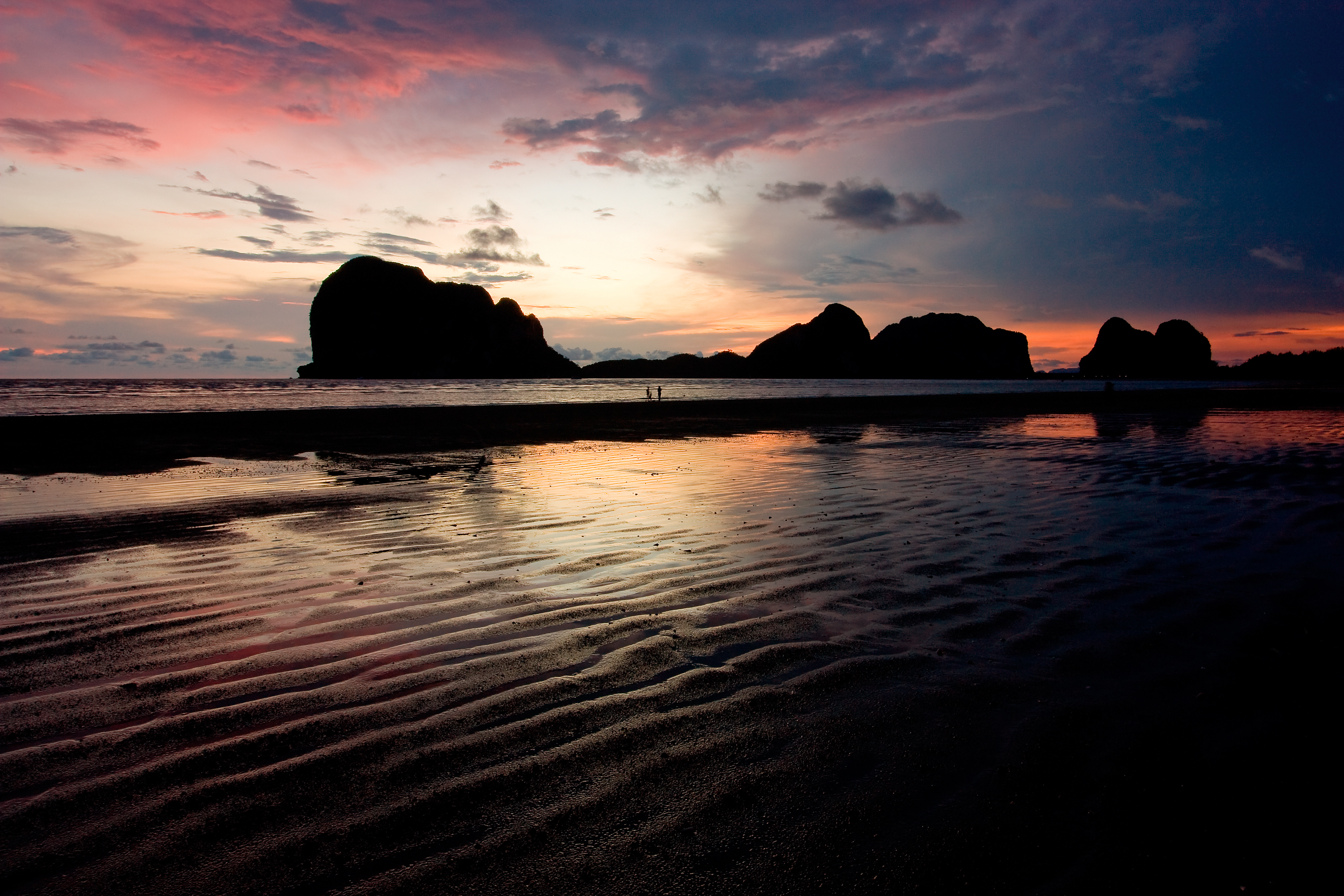
Silhouette of Pak Meng Beach, part of Hat Chao Mai National Park and most renowned beach of the province

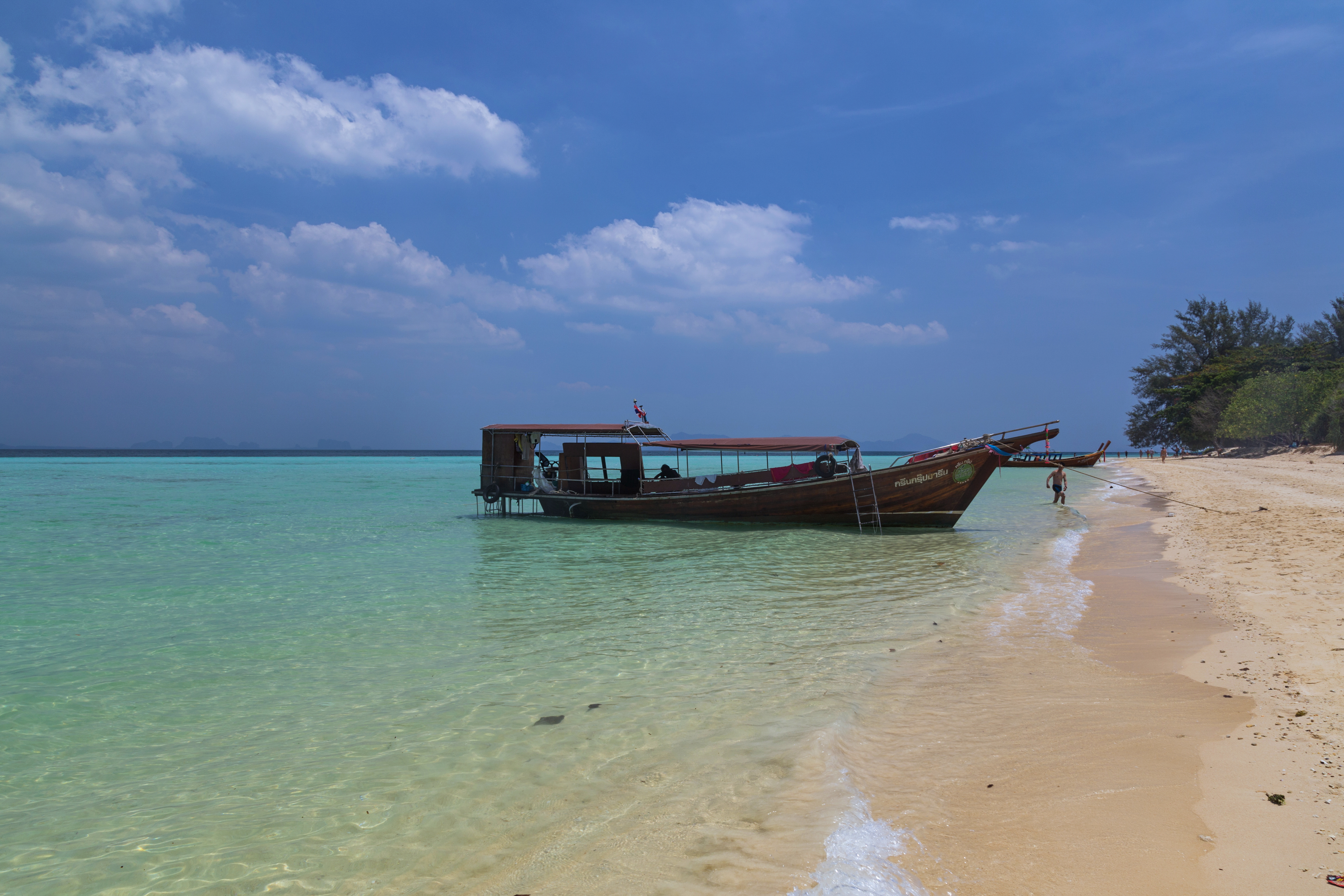
Clear water and long-tailed boat at Ko Kradan

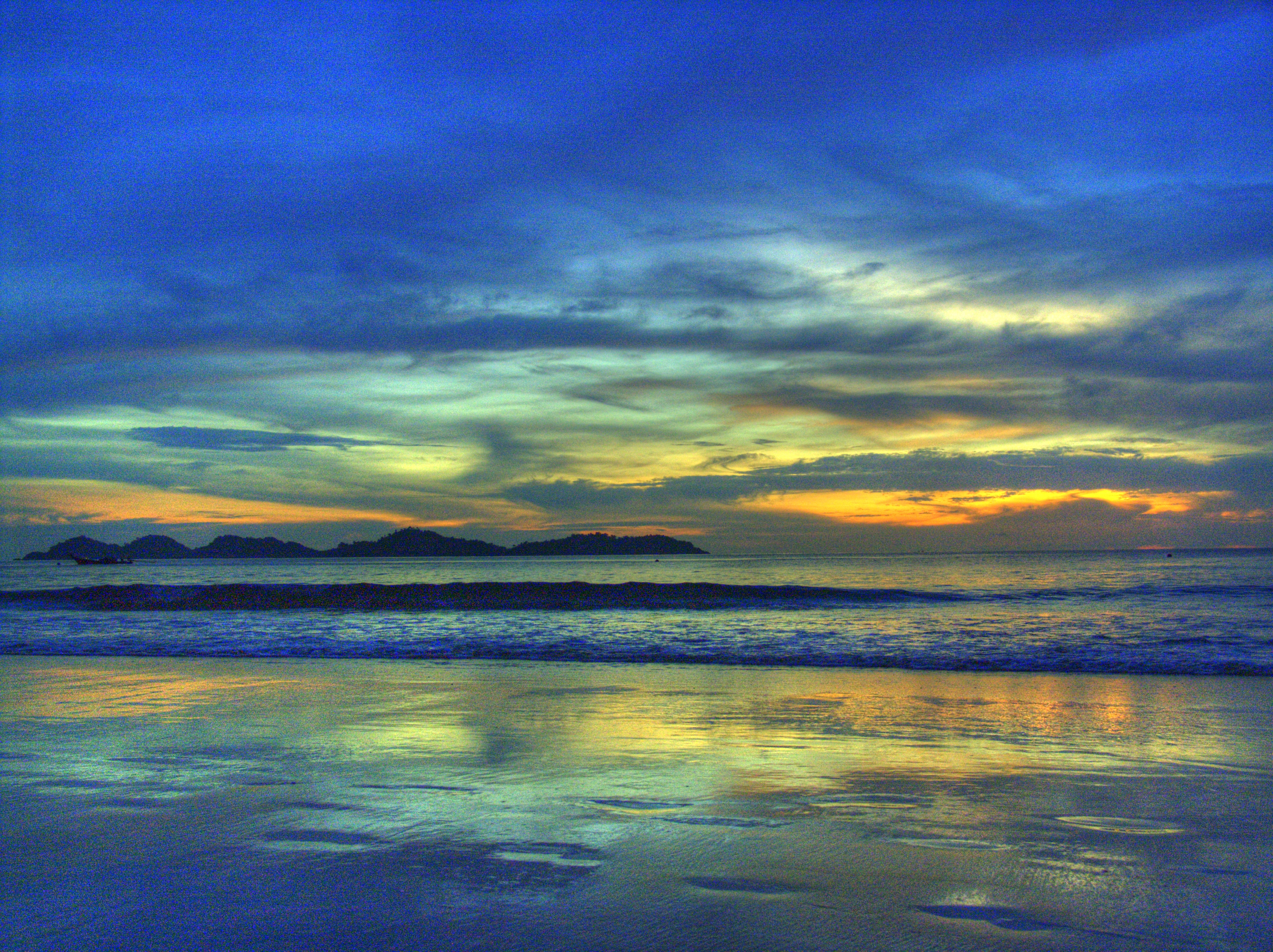
Sunset at Ko Muk

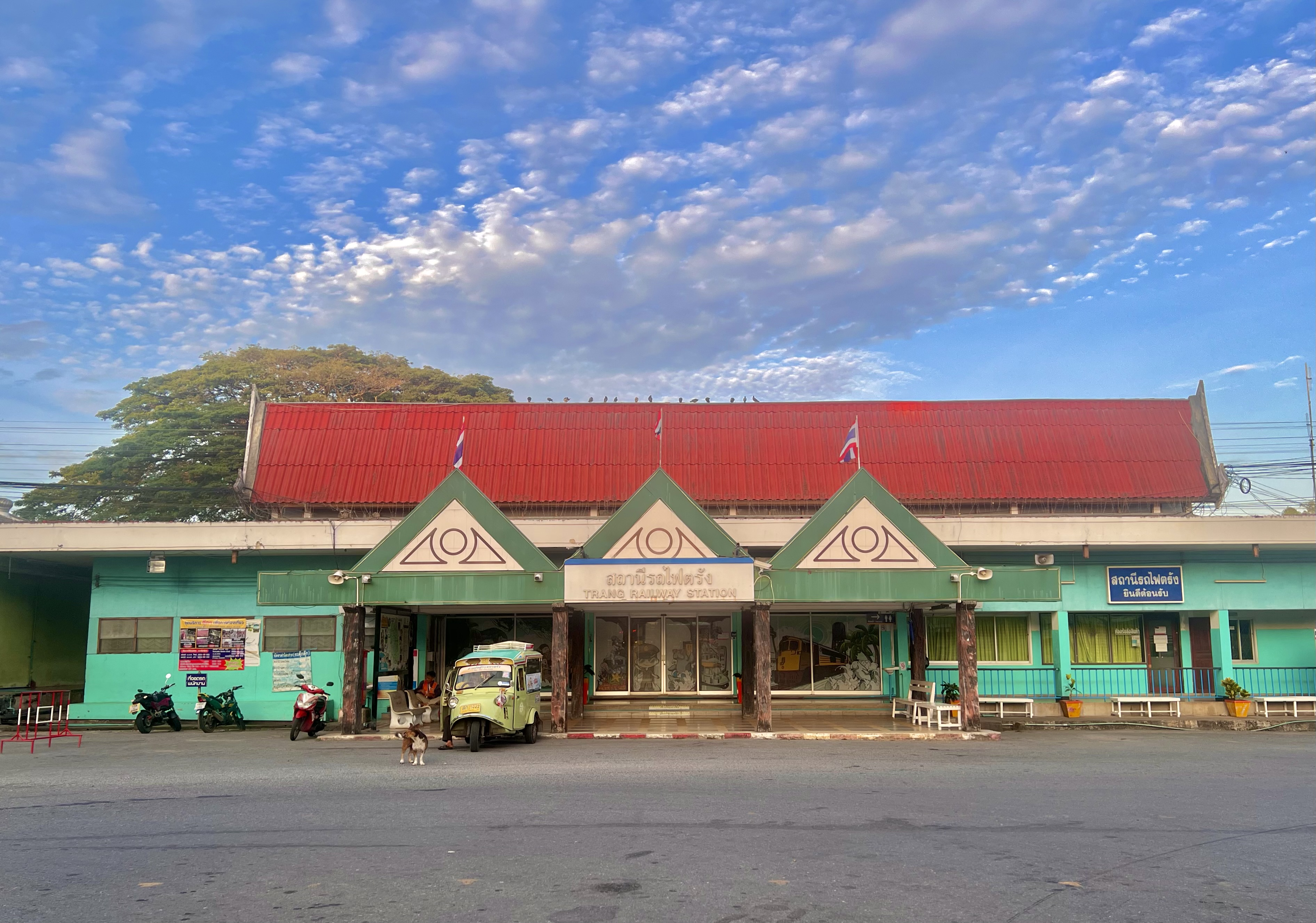
Façade of Trang railway station

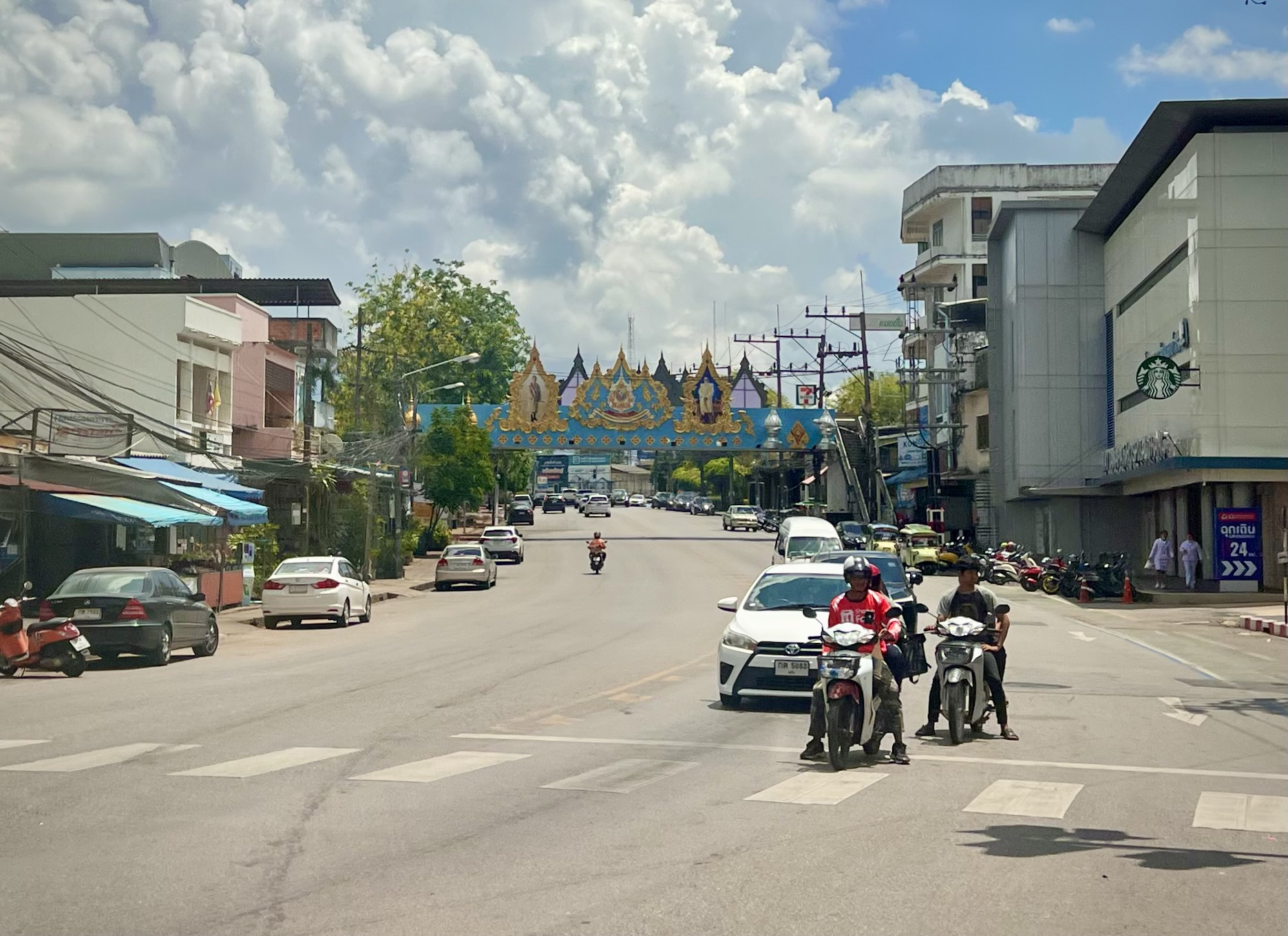
Street in Trang
