= Ko Mak, Phatthalung =

Ko Mak
Native name: เกาะหมาก
- Interactive map of Ko Mak

Geography
- Location: Songkhla Lake
- Coordinates: 7.43155°N 100.35135°E

Administration
- Thailand

Demographics
- Ethnic groups: Thai

Ko Mak (Thai: เกาะหมาก; pronounced [kɔ̀ʔ màːk]) is an island in Thailand that is located in the middle of Songkhla Lake, Pak Phayun District, Phatthalung Province in southern Thailand.

== Description ==
Surrounded by Songkhla Lake, the upper part is adjacent to Thale Noi Non-Hunting Area, the lower part is adjacent to Pakro Subdistrict, Singhanakhon District, Songkhla Province.

The island is rich in natural resources and biodiversity, with is also historically important, as archaeological evidence of human settlement has been discovered since prehistoric times, up until around 43 BCE to 57 AD. The flat plains along the island are flooded almost all year round. During the dry season, when the sea level dries up, green meadows appear instead. They are a food source for the local buffalo herds, which is a unique characteristic of this place.

The inhabitants of Songkhla Lake Basin work in fishing and livestock, and some have developed their own lands into tourist attractions that welcome visitors.
