= Krasae Sin district =

Krasae Sin กระแสสินธุ์
- District
- District location in Songkhla province
- Coordinates: 7°37′6″N 100°19′42″E
- Country: Thailand
- Province: Songkhla
- Seat: Krasae Sin

Area
  - Total: 96.4 km^{2} (37.2 sq mi)

Population (2005)
  - Total: 16,055
  - Density: 166.5/km^{2} (431/sq mi)
- Time zone: UTC+7 (ICT)
- Postal code: 90270
- Geocode: 9008

Krasae Sin (Thai: กระแสสินธุ์, pronounced [krā.sɛ̌ː sǐn]) is a district (amphoe) in the northern part of Songkhla province, southern Thailand.

== Geography ==
Neighboring districts are (from the south clockwise): Sathing Phra of Songkhla Province; Pak Phayun, Bang Kaeo, Khao Chaison, and Mueang Phatthalung of Phatthalung province; and Ranot of Songkhla Province.

The western part of the district is on the shores of Thale Luang and Thale Noi, the northern parts of the Songkhla Lake.

== History ==
The minor district (king amphoe) was created on 16 February 1978, when the three tambons, Choeng Sae, Ko Yai, and Rong, were split off from the Ranot district. It was upgraded to a full district on 4 July 1994.

== Administration ==
The district is divided into four sub-districts (tambons), which are further subdivided into 22 villages (mubans). There are no municipal (thesaban) areas within the district; there are a further four tambon administrative organizations (TAO).

No.	Name	Thai name	Villages	Pop.
1.	Koh Yai	เกาะใหญ่	9	6,928
2.	Rong	โรง	5	3,033
3.	Choeng Sae	เชิงแส	4	2,987
4.	Krasae Sin	กระแสสินธุ์	4	3,107
