= Sathing Phra district =

Sathing Phra สทิงพระ
- District
- District location in Songkhla province
- Coordinates: 7°28′24″N 100°26′18″E
- Country: Thailand
- Province: Songkhla

Area
  - Total: 120.0 km^{2} (46.3 sq mi)

Population (2005)
  - Total: 50,089
  - Density: 417.4/km^{2} (1,081/sq mi)
- Time zone: UTC+7 (ICT)
- Postal code: 90190
- Geocode: 9002

Sathing Phra (Thai: สทิงพระ, pronounced [sā.tʰīŋ pʰráʔ]) is a district (amphoe) in the northern part of Songkhla province, southern Thailand.

== Geography ==
Neighboring districts are (from the south clockwise): Singhanakhon of Songkhla Province; Pak Phayun of Phatthalung province; Krasae Sin and Ranot of Songkhla Province. To the east is the Gulf of Thailand.

The western part of the district is at the shore of the Thale Luang, the northern part of the Songkhla Lake.

== History ==
The ancient port city of Satingpra was one of the most important trading centres of the Tambralinga Kingdom. Archaeological digs and investigations conducted toward the end of the 20th century testify to the existence of a fortified citadel protected by a moat and a quadrangular surrounding wall made of brick. A sophisticated system of canals connected the sea to the Songkhla Lake permitting the circulation of ships. The excavations brought to light artifacts of historical and artistic value. The modern district was originally named Chathing Phra. It was renamed Sathing Phra in 1961.

== Administration ==
The district is divided into 11 sub-districts (tambons), which are further subdivided into 79 villages (mubans). Sathing Phra is a township (thesaban tambon) which covers parts of tambon Cha Thing Phra.

No.	Name	Thai name	Villages	Pop.
1.	Chathing Phra	จะทิ้งพระ	7	6,009
2.	Kradang-nga	กระดังงา	7	4,674
3.	Sanam Chai	สนามชัย	5	4,012
4.	Di Luang	ดีหลวง	8	3,608
5.	Chumphon	ชุมพล	7	5,664
6.	Khlong Ri	คลองรี	9	3,787
7.	Khu Khut	คูขุด	9	5,657
8.	Tha Hin	ท่าหิน	9	4,345
9.	Wat Chan	วัดจันทร์	6	3,778
10.	Bo Daeng	บ่อแดง	6	4,794
11.	Bo Dan	บ่อดาน	6	3,761
