= Ranot district =

Ranot ระโนด
- District
- District location in Songkhla province
- Coordinates: 7°46′6″N 100°19′24″E
- Country: Thailand
- Province: Songkhla
- Seat: Ranot

Area
  - Total: 783.8 km^{2} (302.6 sq mi)

Population (2008)
  - Total: 67,551
  - Density: 90.5/km^{2} (234/sq mi)
- Time zone: UTC+7 (ICT)
- Postal code: 90140
- Geocode: 9007

Ranot (Thai: ระโนด, pronounced [rā.nôːt]) is the northernmost district (amphoe) of Songkhla province, southern Thailand.

== Geography ==
Neighboring districts are (from the south clockwise): Sathing Phra, Krasae Sin of Songkhla Province; Mueang Phatthalung, Khuan Khanun of Phatthalung province; Cha-uat, and Hua Sai of Nakhon Si Thammarat province. To the east is the Gulf of Thailand.

The western part of the district is on the shores of Thale Noi, the northern part of the Songkhla Lake.

== Etymology ==
The name Ranot is a Thai corruption of Renut (Jawi: رينوت), its original name in Malay. However, many local residents maintain that it is a shortened form of the Thai words ราวโตนด (rao tanot: 'a row of palm trees'). The official English-language spelling Ranot is falling out of favor locally, with the more phonetically accurate spelling 'Ranode' being used in its place.

== Administration ==
The district is divided into 12 sub-districts (tambons), which are further subdivided into 73 villages (mubans). There are two sub-district municipalities (thesaban tambons). Ranot covers parts of tambon Ranot, and Bo Tru covers parts of tambons Bo Tru, Ra Wa, and Wat Son. There are a further 12 tambon administrative organizations (TAO).

No.	Name	Thai	Villages	Pop.
1.	Ranot	ระโนด	7	10,865
2.	Khlong Daen	คลองแดน	5	3,389
3.	Takhria	ตะเครียะ	5	4,120
4.	Thabon	ท่าบอน	10	8,760
5.	Ban Mai	บ้านใหม่	9	4,359
6.	Botru	บ่อตรุ	5	7,939
7.	Paktrae	ปากแตระ	6	5,902
8.	Phang Yang	พังยาง	4	3,472
9.	Rawa	ระวะ	7	6,366
10.	Wat Son	วัดสน	4	5,099
11.	Ban Khao	บ้านขาว	6	4,622
12.	Daen Sa-nguan	แดนสงวน	5	2,658
