= Phatthalung (disambiguation) =

Phatthalung may refer to these places in Thailand:

- the town Phatthalung
- Phatthalung Province
- Mueang Phatthalung district
