= Songkhla (disambiguation) =

Songkhla may refer to:

== Places in Thailand ==
- Songkhla, a town
- Songkhla Province
- Mueang Songkhla District
- Songkhla Lake

== See also ==
- Mahidol Adulyadej, Prince of Songkla
