= Na Yong district =

Na Yong นาโยง
- District
- District location in Trang province
- Coordinates: 7°33′42″N 99°41′42″E
- Country: Thailand
- Province: Trang
- Seat: Na Yong Nuea

Area
  - Total: 165.1 km^{2} (63.7 sq mi)

Population (2005)
  - Total: 42,294
  - Density: 256.2/km^{2} (664/sq mi)
- Time zone: UTC+7 (ICT)
- Postal code: 92170
- Geocode: 9208

Na Yong (Thai: นาโยง, pronounced [nāː jōːŋ]) is a district (amphoe) of Trang province, Thailand.

== History ==
The minor district (king amphoe) Na Yong was established on 1 April 1990 by splitting off six tambons from Mueang Trang district. It was upgraded to a full district on 4 November 1993.

== Geography ==
Neighboring districts are (from the south clockwise): Yan Ta Khao and Mueang Trang of Trang Province; Si Banphot and Srinagarindra of Phatthalung province.

== Administration ==
The district is divided into six sub-districts (tambons), which are further subdivided into 53 villages (mubans). Na Yong Nuea is a township (thesaban tambon) which covers parts of tambon Na Yong Nuea. There are a further six tambon administrative organizations (TAO).

No.	Name	Thai name	Villages	Pop.
1.	Na Yong Nuea	นาโยงเหนือ	7	8,743
2.	Chong	ช่อง	7	4,599
3.	Lamo	ละมอ	10	7,316
4.	Khok Saba	โคกสะบ้า	11	6,903
5.	Na Muen Si	นาหมื่นศรี	8	5,938
6.	Na Khao Sia	นาข้าวเสีย	10	8,795

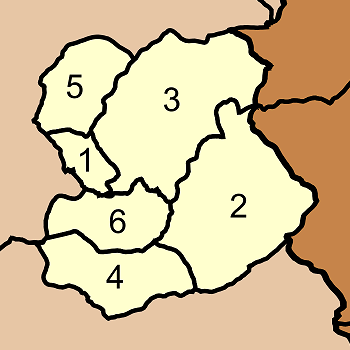
