= Palian district =

Palian ปะเหลียน
- District
- Ton Plew Waterfall, Namtok Pan Forest Park, Lumplok Waterfall, Yong Star Cape
- District location in Trang province
- Coordinates: 7°10′18″N 99°41′12″E
- Country: Thailand
- Province: Trang
- Seat: Tha Kham

Area
  - Total: 973.13 km^{2} (375.73 sq mi)

Population (2005)
  - Total: 62,914
  - Density: 64.7/km^{2} (168/sq mi)
- Time zone: UTC+7 (ICT)
- Postal code: 92120
- Geocode: 9204

Palian (Thai: ปะเหลียน, pronounced [pā.lǐa̯n]) is a district (amphoe) in the southern part of Trang province, Thailand.

== Geography ==
Neighboring districts are (from the east clockwise) Kong Ra, Tamot, and Pa Bon of Phatthalung province, Khuan Kalong, Manang, and Thung Wa of Satun province, Hat Samran and Yan Ta Khao of Trang Province.

== History ==
Originally named Yong Sata (หยงสตา) or Tan Yong Sata (ตันหยงสตา; Kelantan-Pattani Malay means 'Mango Plum Cape'), it was renamed Palian in 1939.

Palian is believed to have been a seaport since ancient times, some 1,800 years ago, paired with Takola (now's Mueang Trang). When an ancient Greek merchant named Alexander sailed through here in 150, and told the story of his journey to Ptolemy. At that time, Palian was called Palanda.

== Administration ==
The district is divided into 10 sub-districts (tambons), which are further subdivided into 85 villages (mubans). Tha Kham is a township (thesaban tambon) which covers parts of tambon Tha Kham. There are a further 10 tambon administrative organizations (TAO).

No.	Name	Thai name	Villages	Pop.
1.	Tha Kham	ท่าข้าม	9	8,296
2.	Thung Yao	ทุ่งยาว	7	6,447
3.	Palian	ปะเหลียน	14	10,932
4.	Bang Duan	บางด้วน	6	4,103
7.	Ban Na	บ้านนา	12	9,565
9.	Suso	สุโสะ	11	6,417
10.	Li Phang	ลิพัง	7	5,591
11.	Ko Sukorn	เกาะสุกร	4	2,454
12.	Tha Phaya	ท่าพญา	4	3,504
13.	Laem Som	แหลมสอม	11	5,605

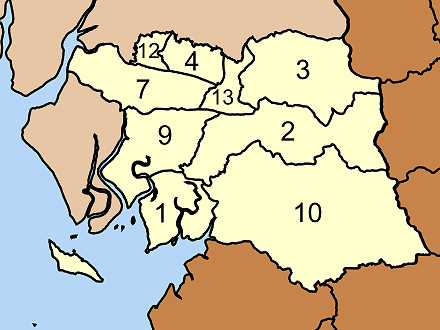

Missing numbers are tambons which now form Hat Samran District.

== Notable people ==
- Poot Lorlek – Muay Thai fighter in 1970s
