= Khao Chaison district =

Khao Chaison เขาชัยสน
- District
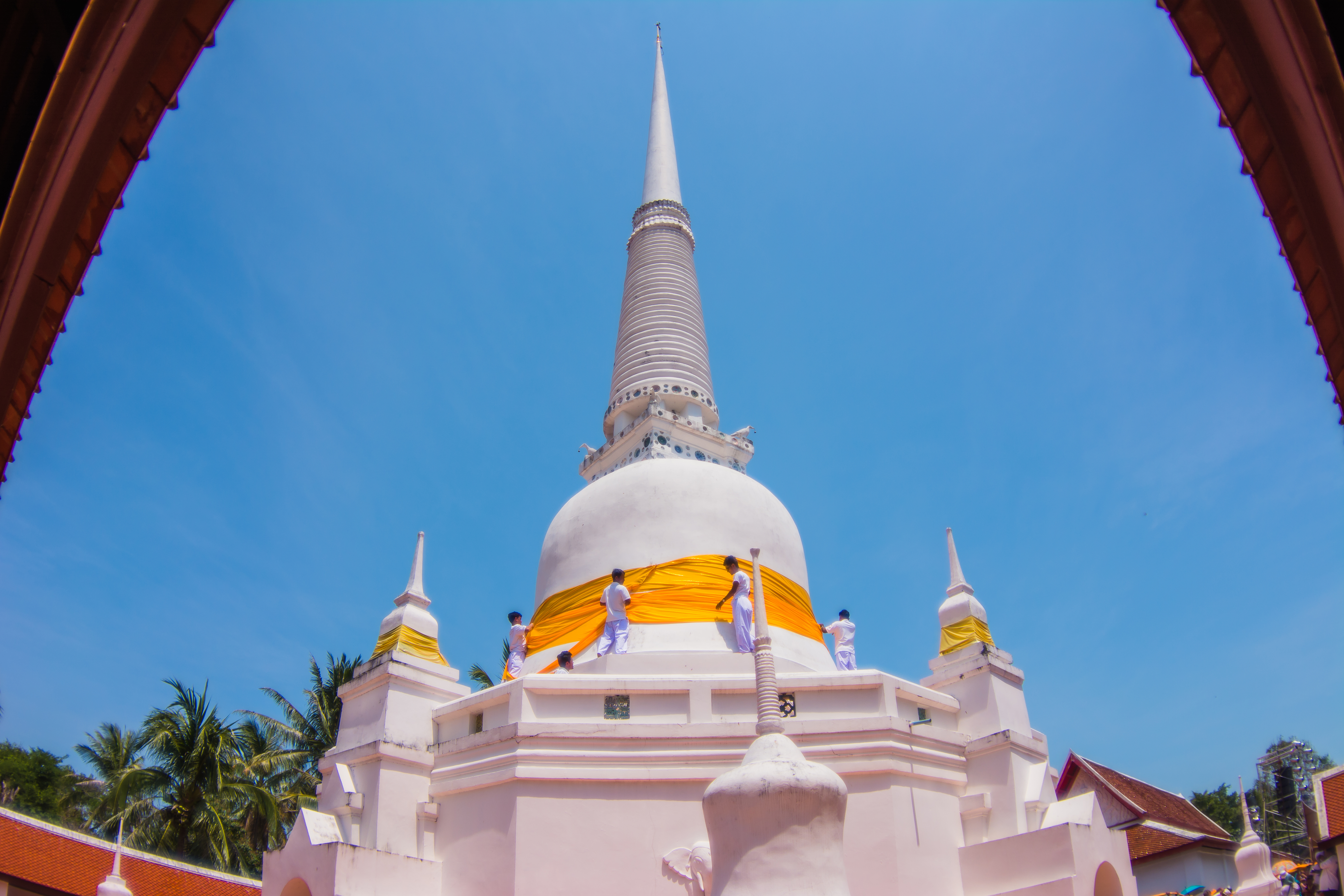
- Wat Khian Bang Kaeo Temple

- District location in Phatthalung province
- Coordinates: 7°27′42″N 100°8′0″E
- Country: Thailand
- Province: Phatthalung
- Seat: Khao Chaison

Area
  - Total: 260.1 km^{2} (100.4 sq mi)

Population (2005)
  - Total: 43,292
  - Density: 166.4/km^{2} (431/sq mi)
- Time zone: UTC+7 (ICT)
- Postal code: 93130
- Geocode: 9303

Khao Chaison (Thai: เขาชัยสน, pronounced [kʰǎw t͡ɕʰāj.sǒn]) is a district (amphoe) of Phatthalung province, southern Thailand.

== Geography ==
Neighboring districts are (from the south clockwise) Bang Kaeo, Tamot, Kong Ra, and Mueang Phatthalung of Phatthalung Province, Krasae Sin of Songkhla province.

The east of the district is on the shore of Thale Luang lake.

== History ==
The district dates back to the minor district (king amphoe) Lampam (ลำปำ), created in 1923 as a subordinate of Mueang Phatthalung District. It consisted of the two sub-districts Lampam and Han Po. On 1 November 1939, the sub-districts Lampam, Phaya Khan, and Khuan Maphrao were reassigned to Mueang District, while the sub-districts Khao Chaison and Khuan Khanun from Mueang District as well as Tha Duea and Chong Thanon from Pak Phayun were added to the minor district. The district office was then moved into Khao Chaison sub-district. In 1940, the minor district was then renamed Khao Chaison to match the central tambon. It was upgraded to a full district on 1 January 1953.

== Administration ==
The district is divided into five sub-districts (tambons), which are further subdivided into 56 villages (mubans). Khao Chaison is a township (thesaban tambon) which covers parts of tambon Khao Chaison. There are a further five tambon administrative organizations (TAO).

No.	Name	Thai name	Villages	Pop.
1.	Khao Chaison	เขาชัยสน	14	12,637
2.	Khuan Khanun	ควนขนุน	10	8,571
5.	Chong Thanon	จองถนน	7	3,681
6.	Han Pho	หานโพธิ์	11	8,704
7.	Khok Muang	โคกม่วง	14	9,699

Missing numbers are tambon which now form Bang Kaeo District.
