= Bang Kaeo district =

Bang Kaew บางแก้ว
- District
- District location in Phatthalung province
- Coordinates: 7°25′48″N 100°10′42″E
- Country: Thailand
- Province: Phatthalung
- Seat: Na Pakho

Area
  - Total: 119.0 km^{2} (45.9 sq mi)

Population (2005)
  - Total: 25,628
  - Density: 215.4/km^{2} (558/sq mi)
- Time zone: UTC+7 (ICT)
- Postal code: 93140
- Geocode: 9309

Bang Kaew (Thai: บางแก้ว, pronounced [bāːŋ kɛ̂ːw]) is a district (amphoe) of Phatthalung province, southern Thailand.

== Geography ==
Neighboring districts are (from the south clockwise) Pak Phayun, Pa Bon, Tamot, and Khao Chaison of Phatthalung Province, and Krasae Sin of Songkhla province.

The eastern part of the district is at the shore of Thale Luang, the northern part of Songkhla Lake.

== History ==
The minor district (king amphoe) was established on 1 April 1990, when three tambon were split off from Khao Chaison district. It was upgraded to a full district on 7 September 1995.

== Administration ==
The district is divided into three sub-districts (tambons), which are further subdivided into 33 villages (mubans). Tha Maduea is a township (thesaban tambon) which covers parts of tambons Tha Maduea and Khok Sak. Another part of Khok Sak belongs to the township Mae Khari, centered in neighboring Tamot District. There are a further three tambon administrative organizations (TAO).

No.	Name	Thai name	Villages	Pop.
1.	Tha Maduea	ท่ามะเดื่อ	7	7,469
2.	Na Pakho	นาปะขอ	13	10,040
3.	Khok Sak	โคกสัก	13	8,119
