= Yan Ta Khao district =

Yan Ta Khao ย่านตาขาว
- District
- District location in Trang province
- Coordinates: 7°23′12″N 99°40′0″E
- Country: Thailand
- Province: Trang
- Seat: Yan Ta Khao

Area
  - Total: 431.1 km^{2} (166.4 sq mi)

Population (2005)
  - Total: 61,416
  - Density: 142.5/km^{2} (369/sq mi)
- Time zone: UTC+7 (ICT)
- Postal code: 92140
- Geocode: 9203

Yan Ta Khao (Thai: ย่านตาขาว, pronounced [jâːn tāː kʰǎːw]) is a district (amphoe) of Trang province, Thailand.

== Geography ==
Neighboring districts are (from the south clockwise): Palian, Kantang, Mueang Trang and Na Yong of Trang Province; Srinagarindra and Kong Ra of Phatthalung province.

== History ==
The minor district (king amphoe) Yan Ta Khao was created on 1 January 1948 as a subordinate of Kantang district. Originally, it consisted of six tambons: Yan Ta Khao, Nong Bo, and Thung Khai were split off from Kantang District, Na Chum Het from Mueang Trang District, and Nai Khuan and Phrong Chorakhe from Palian District. It was upgraded to a full district on 5 June 1956.

== Administration ==
The district is divided into eight sub-districts (tambons), which are further subdivided into 65 villages (mubans). Yan Ta Khao is a township (thesaban tambon) which covers parts of tambon Yan Ta Khao. There are further eight tambon administrative organizations (TAO).

No.	Name	Thai name	Villages	Pop.
1.	Yan Ta Khao	ย่านตาขาว	5	10,924
2.	Nong Bo	หนองบ่อ	6	4,628
3.	Na Chum Het	นาชุมเห็ด	9	8,179
4.	Nai Khuan	ในควน	9	8,551
5.	Phrong Chorakhe	โพรงจระเข้	7	6,048
6.	Thung Krabue	ทุ่งกระบือ	9	7,878
7.	Thung Khai	ทุ่งค่าย	10	8,677
8.	Ko Pia	เกาะเปียะ	10	6,531

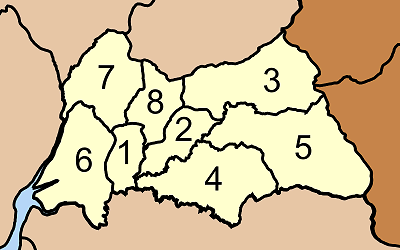
