= Khao Pu–Khao Ya National Park =

National park in Thailand

Khao Pu-Khao Ya National Park
- อุทยานแห่งชาติเขาปู่-เขาย่า
- IUCN category II (national park)
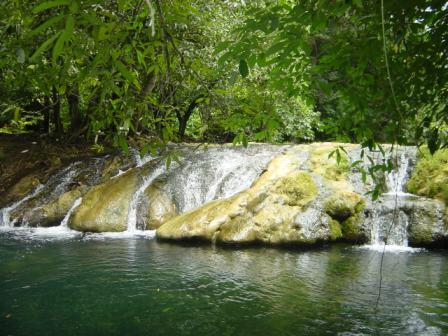
- Khao Pu Khao Ya National Park

- Location within Thailand
- Location: Thailand
- Nearest city: Si Banphot, Phatthalung
- Coordinates: 7°46′45.9″N 99°45′55.4″E
- Area: 694 km^{2} (268 sq mi)
- Established: May 27, 1982
- Visitors: 167,309 (in 2019)
- Governing body: Department of National Parks, Wildlife and Plant Conservation

Khao Pu–Khao Ya National Park (Thai:เขาปู่-เขาย่า) is the 42nd national park of Thailand. It spreads across three southern provinces: Nakhon Si Thammarat, Phatthalung, and Trang. It was established on May 27, 1982. It is known for its diverse ecosystem and wide range of wildlife; consisting of 162 animal species. It was named by local people "Bha Brommajan" which means "the forest of virginity".

== Geography ==
The park, with an area of 433,750 rai ~ 694 square kilometres (268 sq mi) lies in the Nakhon Si Thammarat Range or Banthat mountain range. Hin Tan Hill is the highest peak of the park at 877 meters above sea level. Approximately 60 percent of the park is covered with tropical rain forest and some areas of the park are covered with evergreen forest. Khao Banthat Wildlife Sanctuary is beside Khao Pu Khao Ya National Park. The center of the park is considered to be the demarcation line, separating Trang and Phatthalung Provinces. The dividing line is a brook, the water source for people who live in both provinces. Khao Pu Khao Ya in Phatthalung Province is the water source of the La Mai, Mai Siab, and Cha-Uat canals which unite with the Pak Panang River. On the other side, in Trang province, Khao Pu Khao Ya is the water source of Lamphu Ra and Lamor canals which join the Trang River.

== History ==
Khao Ya, and especially Khao Pu, are considered to be holy places in Phatthalung Province. People believe that Khao Pu is the place where Ta Pu spirit lives. Ta Pu is half-human, half-Gandharvas (god of music). People often visit to ask him for his blessing. Ta Pu symbolizes goodness and purity. Every year people gather to participate in a ceremony worshipping Ta Pu and their ancestors.

Around April to May people annually participate in "wan wang" which means "free day". Usually held for three days, over this period people cease all kind of activities. This traditional ceremony is very similar to Songkran (Thai New Year). In this ceremony, however, not only laypersons can participate, but monks are also allowed to join. People will gently pour and sprinkle water on statues of Buddha first, then on monks and elders. Nobody is allowed to play before the ablution. Every evening of each day there is local folk storytelling, dancing, and games.

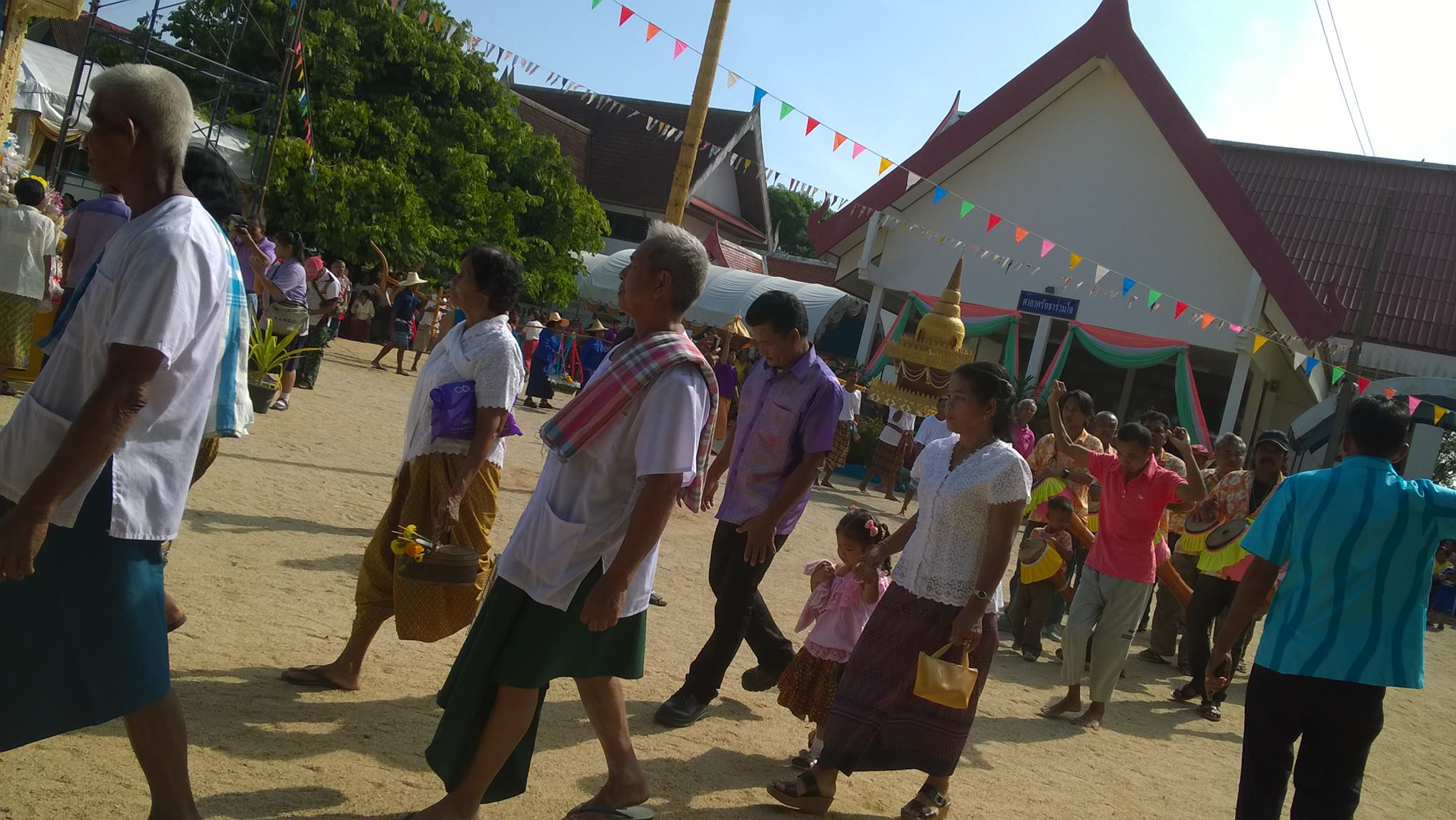
A parade of the local people in Phatthalung Province, celebrating the "Ching Pretah" ceremony

Around September to October annually people participate in "Ching Pretah Day" which is a giving day to ancestor spirits, ghosts, and demons. On this day people will bring desserts such as kanom la, kanom ba, kanom pong, kanom thian, and kanom bae-som (also called joah hu) to the ceremony. They also bring rice, garlic, shrimp paste, chili, coconuts, sugar cane, salt, onions, bananas, candles, and joss-sticks. Then they will set up a table. After the prayer people gather around the table and snatch (it is a tradition, people do it just for fun) food for themselves, believing that it will bring them good luck. Every dessert offered to the spirits represents a particular object. Kanom la is a blanket, kanom ba is a coin, kanom pong is jewelry, kanom bae-som is money, and kanom thian is a pillow.

== Climate ==
The average temperature of the park is around 20-35 degrees Celsius. The rainy season is around May and December and the precipitation is 1,600-2,500 mL per year.

== Flora and fauna ==
Khao Pu Khao Ya National Park contains various animal species. About 60 species of mammals are found here. Some are endangered: palm civet, ground beetle, serow, and yellow-throated marten. Sixty-seven species of reptiles live in the park: blue-winged flying lizard, equatorial spitting cobra, southern curved-toed gecko, roughneck monitor lizard, and cave-dwelling snake. Seventy species of insects are found: Troides amphrysus (butterfly), giant red bug and the Malayan jungleglory (butterfly).

Various birds live in the park: blacked-headed Bulbul, oriental dwarf kingfisher, and puff backed Bulbul. In Khao Pu Khao Ya National Park, mammals are rarely seen. Some are found in particular areas. Most of the animals are endangered species and they are under the protection of the Wildlife Preservation and Protection Act. For example, the Malayan tapir (protected since 1992).

Most of the plants in the park are local plants which still exist in some southern rural areas and most of them were used for product and architectural design. Some hardwood plants such as Hopea odorata, Semecarpus curtisii King and Intsia palembanica Miq. are very popular for building construction.

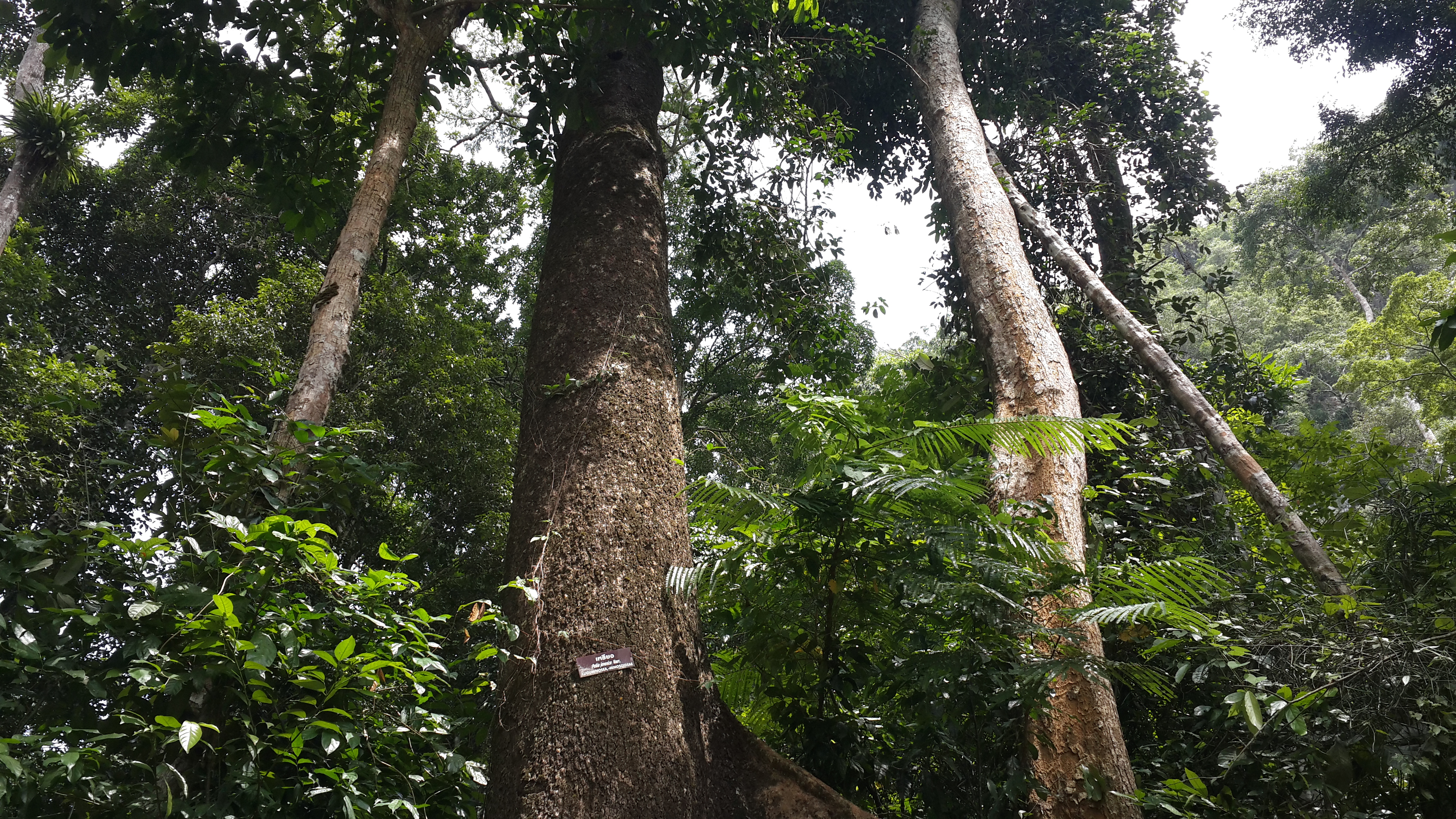
Afternoon View in the forest

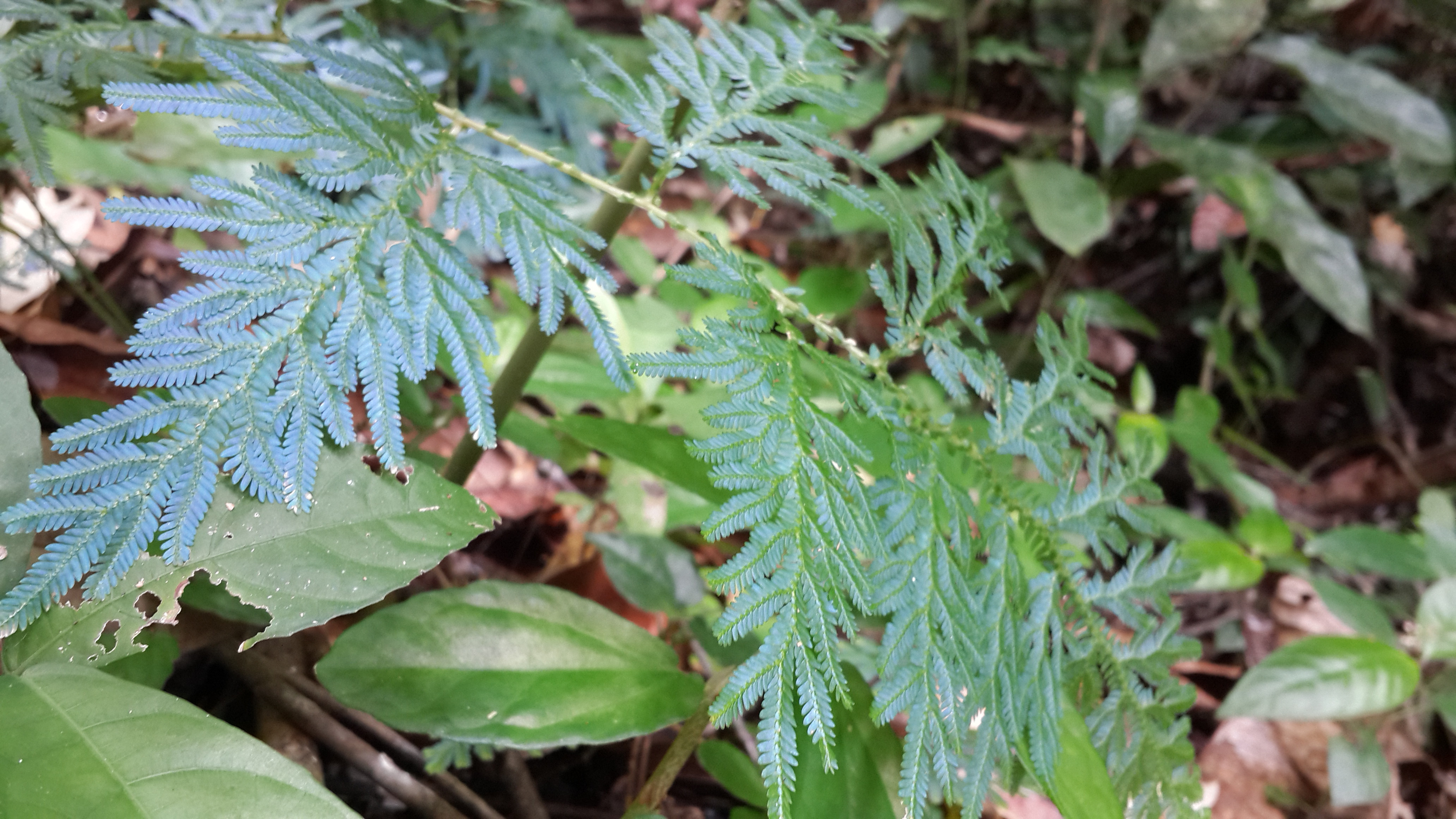
Fern changing its color from green to blue

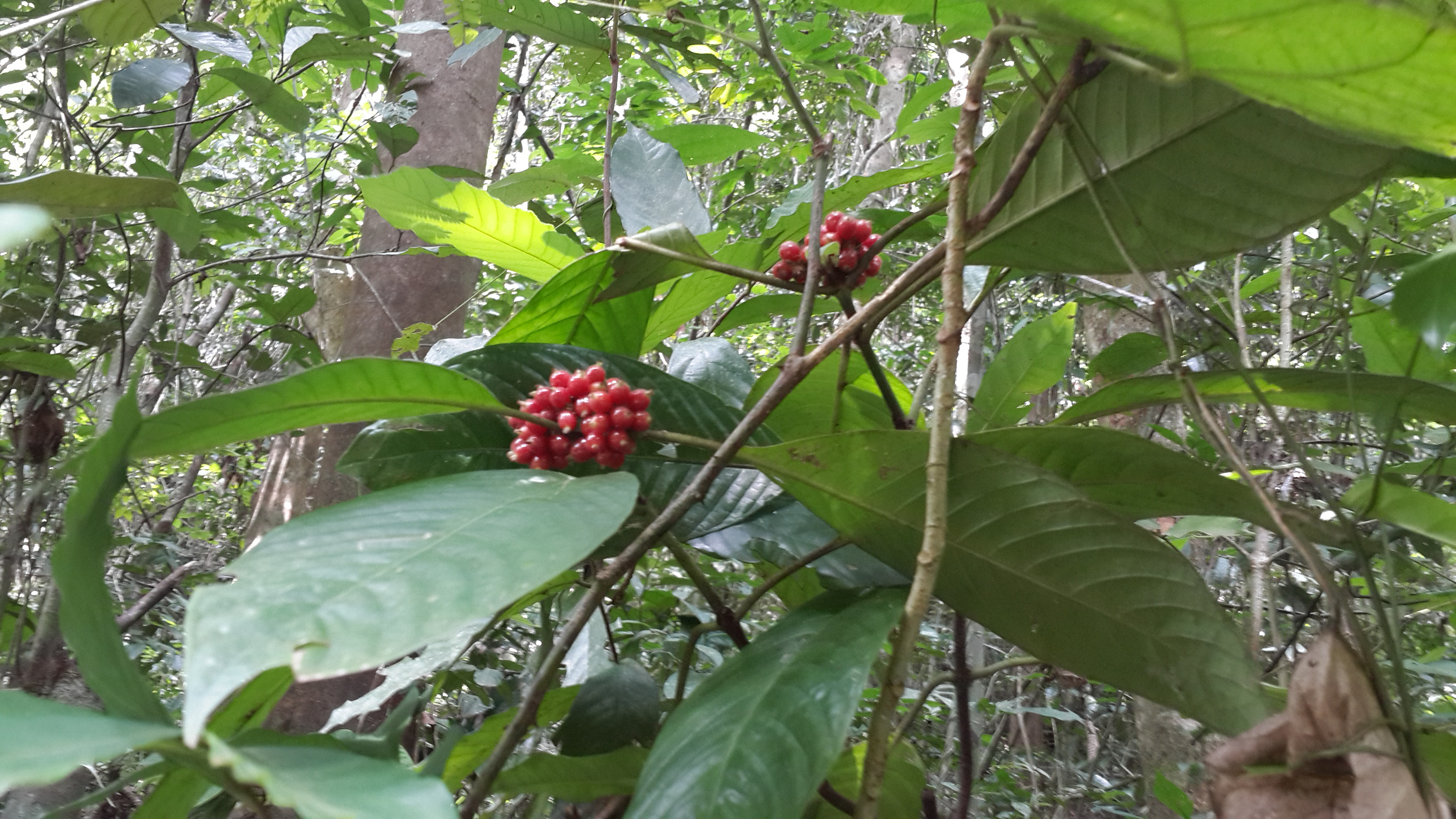
Lipstick palm

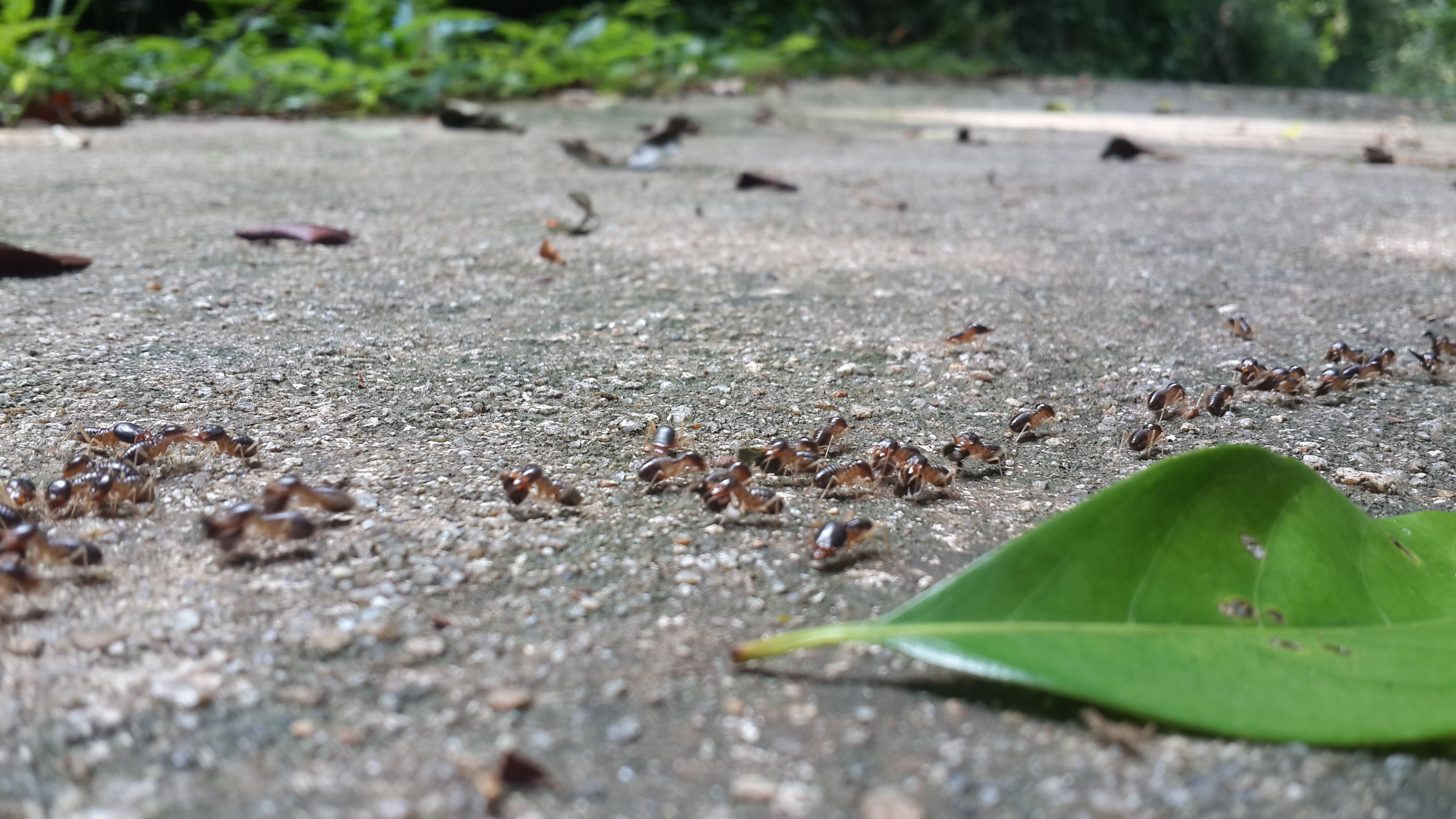
Ants filing back to their nest

== Tourist attractions ==
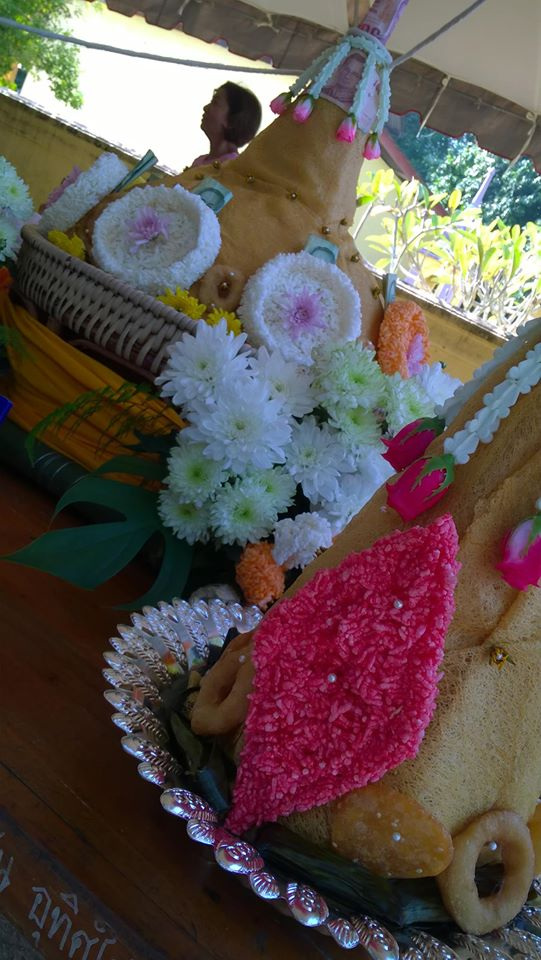
Traditional desserts decorated in trays

- Matcha Cave is in Khao Pu Khao Ya National Park, Phatthalung Province. There are two routes that lead to the cave. One is the main route which is 2.5 kilometers. Another is a walking trail which is 1.8 kilometers from the visitor center. Inside the cave, there is a fish lake which is 100 meters wide and decorated with stalactites. At the cave's center there are approximately 10 statues of Buddha. Due to slippery pathways, nobody is allowed to enter the area after 16:00.
- Pak Jam Waterfall is a seven-tiered waterfall in Khao Pu Khao Ya National Park, Trang Province. Visitors can only travel by foot. It takes approximately an hour to walk to Pak Jam waterfall.
- Nan-Prew Waterfall is a stepped waterfall in Nakhon Si Thammarat Province. The water originates from the Banthat Mountain Range and rejoins the Cha-uat canal below.
- Bee-hive cliff viewpoint is in Khao Pu Khao Ya National Park, Phatthalung. The cliff is 250 meters from the visitor center. Visitors can travel either by foot or bicycle (available in the park). At the cliff, visitors can see clearly the entire area of the park and the Banthat mountain range. Along the cliff, there are thousands of bee hives built annually, in the summer season (February to April).

== Park information ==
There is an admission fee for entrance to the park. Accommodations are available in the park.

== Location ==
Khao Pu-Khao Ya National Park in overview PARO 6 (Songkhla)

2) Khao Pu-Khao Ya National Park in overview PARO 6

	National park
1	Khao Nam Khang
2	Khao Pu-Khao Ya
3	San Kala Khiri
	Wildlife sanctuary
4	Khao Banthat
5	Ton Nga Chang

	Non-hunting area
6	Khao Pa Chang- Laem Kham
7	Khao Reng
8	Pa Krai
9	Phru Khang Khao
10	Thale Luang
11	Thale Noi
12	Thale Sap

	Forest park
13	Khuan Khao Wang
14	Mueang Kao Chai Buri

== See also ==
- List of national parks of Thailand
- DNP - Khao Pu-Khao Ya National Park
- List of Protected Areas Regional Offices of Thailand
