= Singhanakhon district =

Singhanakhon สิงหนคร
- District
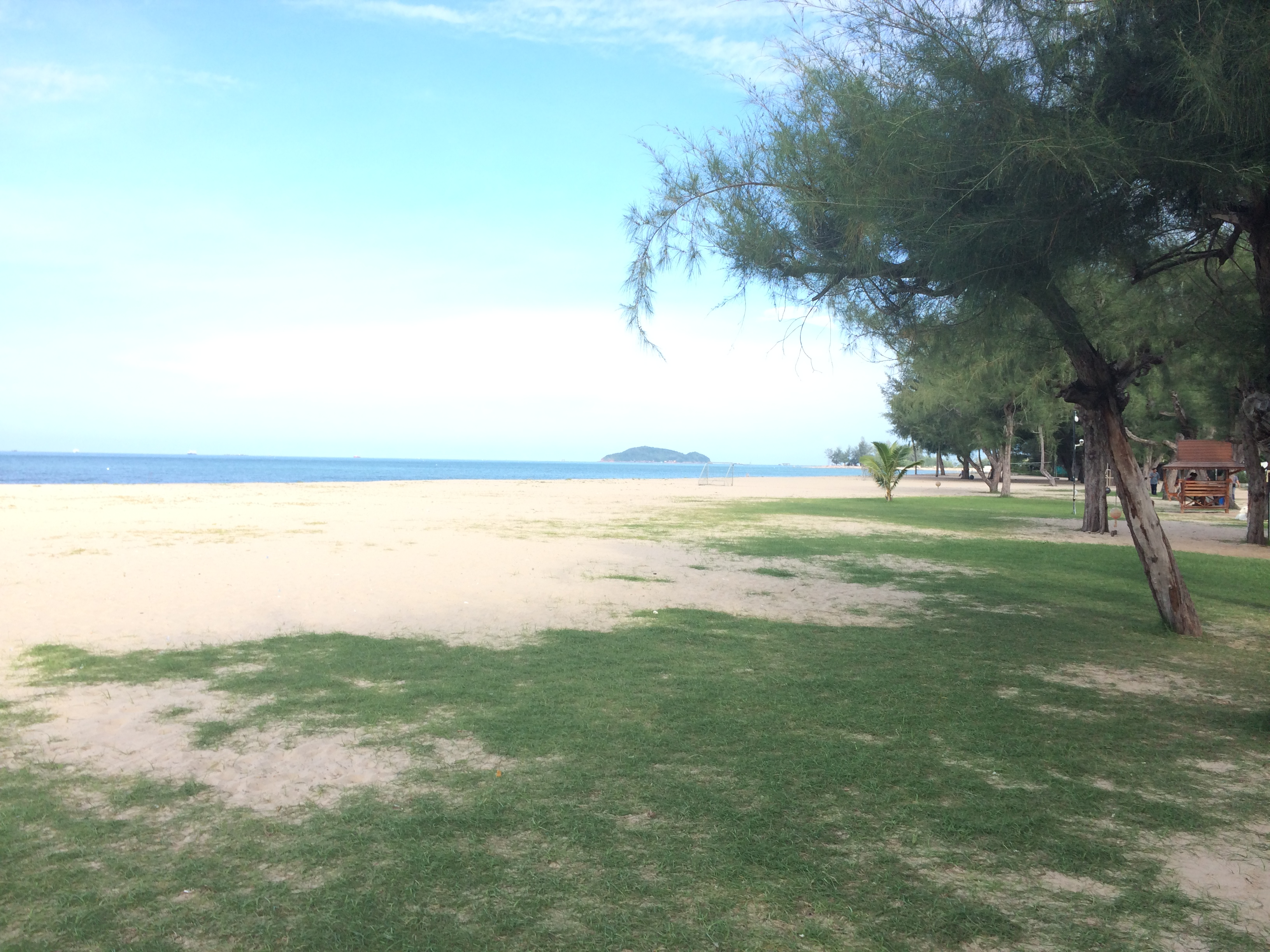
- Beach near Hat Kaeo Resort, Songkhla

- District location in Songkhla province
- Coordinates: 7°14′18″N 100°33′10″E
- Country: Thailand
- Province: Songkhla
- Seat: Sathing Mo

Area
  - Total: 228.0 km^{2} (88.0 sq mi)

Population (2005)
  - Total: 79,281
  - Density: 347.7/km^{2} (901/sq mi)
- Time zone: UTC+7 (ICT)
- Postal code: 90330
- Geocode: 9015

Singhanakhon (Thai: สิงหนคร, pronounced [sǐŋ.hàʔ.náʔ.kʰɔ̄ːn]) is a district (amphoe) in the northern part of Songkhla province, southern Thailand.

== Geography ==
Neighboring districts are (from the south clockwise): Mueang Songkhla, Hat Yai, Khuan Niang of Songkhla Province; Pak Phayun of Phatthalung province; and Sathing Phra of Songkhla Province. To the east is the Gulf of Thailand.

The district is between Thale Luang and Songkhla Lake.

== History ==
The minor district (king amphoe) was created on 15 February 1988, when 11 tambons were split off from Mueang Songkhla district. It was upgraded to a full district on 19 July 1991.

== Administration ==
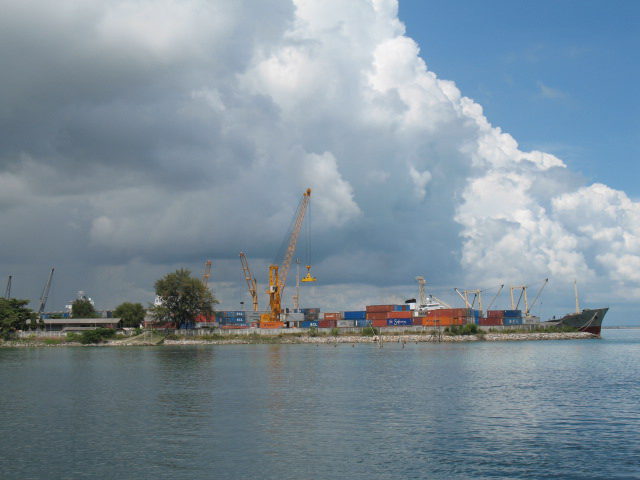
Songkhla Sea Port from Song Thale Park, Mueang Songkhla district

The district is divided into 11 sub-districts (tambons), which are further subdivided into 77 villages (mubans). Singhanakhon is a township (thesaban tambon) which covers parts of tambons Ching Kho and Thamnop and tambon Hua Khao and Sathing Mo. There are a further nine tambon administrative organizations (TAO).

| No. | Name | Thai name | Villages | Pop. |
|---|---|---|---|---|
| 1. | Ching Kho | ชิงโค | 10 | 10,920 |
| 2. | Sathing Mo | สทิงหม้อ | 6 | 15,361 |
| 3. | Thamnop | ทำนบ | 7 | 4,458 |
| 4. | Ram Daeng | รำแดง | 7 | 2,734 |
| 5. | Wat Khanun | วัดขนุน | 8 | 7,937 |
| 6. | Chalae | ชะแล้ | 5 | 2,868 |
| 7. | Pakro | ปากรอ | 6 | 2,571 |
| 8. | Pakhat | ป่าขาด | 5 | 2,846 |
| 9. | Hua Khao | หัวเขา | 8 | 14,567 |
| 10. | Bang Khiat | บางเขียด | 5 | 3,500 |
| 11. | Muang Ngam | ม่วงงาม | 10 | 11,519 |
