= Ratthasat Chitchu =

Thai civil servant and politician

- รัฐศาสตร์ ชิดชู

Governor of Phatthalung Province
- Incumbent
- Assumed office 24 December 2024
- Preceded by: Nisakorn Wisitsora-at

Ratthasat Chitchu (Thai: รัฐศาสตร์ ชิดชู) is a Thai civil servant, serving as Governor of Phatthalung Province since 2024. He succeeded Nisakorn Wisitsora-at. He previously served as Deputy Governor of Nakhon Pathom Province from 2020, and Secretary of the Department of Local Administration for Samut Sakhon.
