= Mueang Phatthalung district =

Mueang Phatthalung เมืองพัทลุง
- District
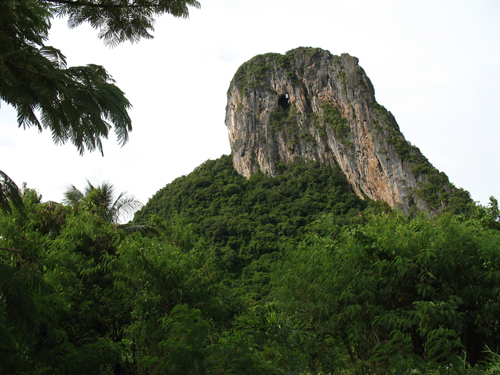
- Khao Ok Thalu

- District location in Phatthalung province
- Coordinates: 7°37′6″N 100°4′24″E
- Country: Thailand
- Province: Phatthalung

Area
  - Total: 436.80 km^{2} (168.65 sq mi)

Population (2021)
  - Total: 120,648
  - Density: 168.65/km^{2} (436.8/sq mi)
- Time zone: UTC+7 (ICT)
- Postal code: 93000
- Geocode: 9301

Mueang Phatthalung (Thai: เมืองพัทลุง, pronounced [mɯ̄a̯ŋ pʰát.tʰā.lūŋ]) is the capital district (amphoe mueang) of Phatthalung province, southern Thailand.

== Geography ==
Neighboring districts are (from the south clockwise) Khao Chaison, Kong Ra, Srinagarindra, and Khuan Khanun of Phatthalung Province, and Ranot and Krasae Sin of Songkhla province.

The eastern part of the district is at the shore of the Thale Luang, the northern part of Songkhla Lake.

== History ==
The district Klang Mueang (กลางเมือง) was one of the three original districts established in 1896. In 1917, it was renamed Lampam (ลำปำ), following the name of the tambon housing the district administration. The administration was moved to tambon Khuha Sawan in 1924. In 1938, the district was renamed Mueang Phatthalung.

== Administration ==
The district is divided into 14 sub-districts (tambons), which are further subdivided into 144 villages (mubans). The town (thesaban mueang) Phatthalung covers tambon Khuhu Sawan, and small parts of tambons Khao Chiak, Tha Miram, Prang Mu, Lampam, Tamnan, and Khuan Maphrao. There are a further 13 tambon administrative organizations (TAO).

No.	Name	Thai name	Villages	Pop.
1.	Khuha Sawan	คูหาสวรรค์	-	38,340
3.	Khao Chiak	เขาเจียก	11	3,656
4.	Tha Miram	ท่ามิหรำ	10	4,980
5.	Khok Cha-ngai	โคกชะงาย	9	5,062
6.	Na Thom	นาท่อม	8	4,386
7.	Prang Mu	ปรางหมู่	9	4,909
8.	Tha Khae	ท่าแค	12	7,512
9.	Lampam	ลำปำ	11	6,049
10.	Tamnan	ตำนาน	14	7,371
11.	Khuan Maphrao	ควนมะพร้าว	16	10,626
12.	Rom Mueang	ร่มเมือง	9	5,129
13.	Chai Buri	ชัยบุรี	13	8,285
14.	Na Not	นาโหนด	12	8,056
15.	Phaya Khan	พญาขัน	10	5,319

Missing numbers are tambon which now form Srinagarindra District.
