= Pa Bon district =

Pa Bon ป่าบอน
- District
- District location in Phatthalung province
- Coordinates: 7°16′12″N 100°10′12″E
- Country: Thailand
- Province: Phatthalung
- Seat: Wang Mai

Area
  - Total: 380.844 km^{2} (147.045 sq mi)

Population (2005)
  - Total: 43,981
  - Density: 115.5/km^{2} (299/sq mi)
- Time zone: UTC+7 (ICT)
- Postal code: 93170
- Geocode: 9308

Pa Bon (Thai: ป่าบอน, pronounced [pàː bɔ̄ːn]) is a district (amphoe) of Phatthalung province, southern Thailand. In this district, significant numbers of Malay Muslims can be found in Thung Nari and Nong Thong tambons.

== Geography ==
Neighboring districts are (from the north clockwise) Tamot, Bang Kaeo, and Pak Phayun of Phatthalung Province, Rattaphum of Songkhla province, Khuan Kalong of Satun province and Palian of Trang province.

== History ==
The minor district was established on 1 May 1983, when the three tambons Pa Bon, Nong Thong, and Khok Sai were split off from Pak Phayun district. It was upgraded to a full district on 21 May 1990.

== Administration ==
The district is divided into five sub-districts (tambons), which are further subdivided into 48 villages (mubans). Pa Bon is a township (thesaban tambon) which covers parts of the tambon Pa Bon, Nong Thong and Wang Mai. There are a further five tambon administrative organizations (TAO).

No.	Name	Thai name	Villages	Pop.
1.	Pa Bon	ป่าบอน	10	9,542
2.	Khok Sai	โคกทราย	12	10,020
3.	Nong Thong	หนองธง	9	9,074
4.	Thung Nari	ทุ่งนารี	9	8,765
6.	Wang Mai	วังใหม่	8	6,580

Geocode 5 is not used.
