= Pak Phayun district =

Pak Phayun ปากพะยูน
- District
- District location in Phatthalung province
- Coordinates: 7°20′30″N 100°19′0″E
- Country: Thailand
- Province: Phatthalung
- Seat: Pak Phayun

Area
  - Total: 433.3 km^{2} (167.3 sq mi)

Population (2008)
  - Total: 50,052
  - Density: 115.3/km^{2} (299/sq mi)
- Time zone: UTC+7 (ICT)
- Postal code: 93120
- Geocode: 9306

Pak Phayun (Thai: ปากพะยูน, pronounced [pàːk pʰā.jūːn]) is a district (amphoe) of Phatthalung province, southern Thailand.

== Geography ==
Neighboring districts are (from the west clockwise) Pa Bon and Bang Kaeo of Phatthalung Province, Krasae Sin, Sathing Phra, Singhanakhon, and Khuan Niang of Songkhla province.

To the east of the district is the Thale Luang lake, which through a narrow strait opens into Songkhla Lake south of the district.

== History ==
The district was established in 1896 as part of the thesaphiban administrative reforms, originally subdivided into 17 tambons.

In 1903 it was renamed from Taksin (ทักษิณ, meaning 'south') to Pak Phayun.

== Economy ==
The gathering of edible bird's nests is a significant contributor to the local economy. The state auctions off concessions to private firms for the right to collect bird's nests, largely in Ko Mak Sub-district. The province earned 450 million baht in the latest five-year concession auction for nests harvested from caves, primarily on Ko Rangnok ('Bird's Nest Island'), down from the 100 million baht a year earned in previous auctions. In decline also was the quantity of edible nests collected in Ko Mak. In 2017, 3.46 tonnes of nests were gathered, dropping from 3.6 tonnes in 2016. Bird's nests taken from the caves in Ko Mak can fetch 120,000 baht per kilogram, and when exported to China the price can reach one million baht per kilogram.

== Administration ==
The district is divided into seven sub-districts (tambons), which are further subdivided into 63 villages (mubans). Pak Phayun is a sub-district municipality (thesaban tambon) which covers parts of tambon Pak Phayun. There are a further seven tambon administrative organizations (TAO).

No.	Name	Thai	Villages	Pop.
1.	Pak Phayun	ปากพะยูน	6	8,609
2.	Don Pradu	ดอนประดู่	11	6,416
3.	Ko Nang Kham	เกาะนางคำ	9	5,503
4.	Ko Mak	เกาะหมาก	11	7,029
5.	Falami	ฝาละมี	11	10,613
6.	Han Thao	หารเทา	9	9,506
7.	Don Sai	ดอนทราย	6	2,376
