= Ko Sukorn =

Native name: เกาะสุกร
- Interactive map of Ko Sukorn

Geography
- Location: Strait of Malacca
- Coordinates: 7°6′0″N 99°34′0″E
- Archipelago: Sukorn Islands
- Area: 12.33 km^{2} (4.76 sq mi)

Administration
- Thailand
- Province: Trang
- District: Palian
- Tambon: Ko Sukorn

Demographics
- Population: 2,454 (2012)

Additional information
- Time zone: ICT (UTC+7)
- Postal code: 92120

Ko Sukorn or Ko Sukon or Ko Mu is an island in the Andaman Sea in the Palian district, Trang province, southwest Thailand. Sukon and mu both mean 'pig'. It has a population of about 3,000 people, most of whom profess Islam.

== Sukorn Islands ==
There are a total of 15 islands in the Sukorn archipelago including the main island Ko Sukorn.

Nr	Island	Area (km^{2})	Population
1	Ko Sukorn	12.334	2,454
2	Ko Phetra	0.974	0
3	Ko Lao Liang Tai	0.268	0
4	Ko Lao Liang Nuea	0.220	0
5	Ko Ta Bai	0.148	0
6	Ko Chap Pi Yai	0.097	0
7	Ko Beng	0.076	0
8	Ko Daeng	0.018	0
9	Ko Tu Lui Yai	0.015	0
10	Ko Tu Tun Phae	0.011	0
11	Ko Chap Pi Lek	0.006	0
12	Ko Daeng Noi	0.006	0
13	Ko Lak	0.003	0
14	Ko Chang Kap	0.000	0
15	Ko Tu Lui Noi	0.000	0
Total		14.176	2,454
