= Kong Ra district =

Kong Ra กงหรา
- District
- District location in Phatthalung province
- Coordinates: 7°24′12″N 99°57′0″E
- Country: Thailand
- Province: Phatthalung
- Seat: Kong Ra

Area
  - Total: 255.856 km^{2} (98.787 sq mi)

Population (2005)
  - Total: 33,413
  - Density: 130.6/km^{2} (338/sq mi)
- Time zone: UTC+7 (ICT)
- Postal code: 93180
- Geocode: 9302

Kong Ra (Thai: กงหรา, pronounced [kōŋ rǎː]) is a district (amphoe) of Phatthalung province, southern Thailand.

== Geography ==
Neighboring districts are (from the north clockwise) Srinagarindra, Mueang Phatthalung, Khao Chaison, and Tamot of Phatthalung Province, Palian and Yan Ta Khao of Trang province.

== History ==
The minor district (king amphoe) was created on 1 October 1975, when the three tambons Kong Ra, Khlong Chaloem, and Charat were split off from Mueang Phatthalung district. It was upgraded to a full district on 13 July 1981.

== Administration ==
The district is divided into five sub-districts (tambons), which are further subdivided into 45 villages (mubans). There are no municipal (thesaban) areas. There are five tambon administrative organizations (TAO).

No.	Name	Thai name	Villages	Pop.
1.	Kong Ra	กงหรา	7	3,982
2.	Charat	ชะรัด	9	6,662
3.	Khlong Chaloem	คลองเฉลิม	14	12,118
4.	Khlong Sai Khao	คลองทรายขาว	8	6,144
5.	Som Wang	สมหวัง	7	4,507
