= Srinagarindra district =

Srinagarindra ศรีนครินทร์
- District
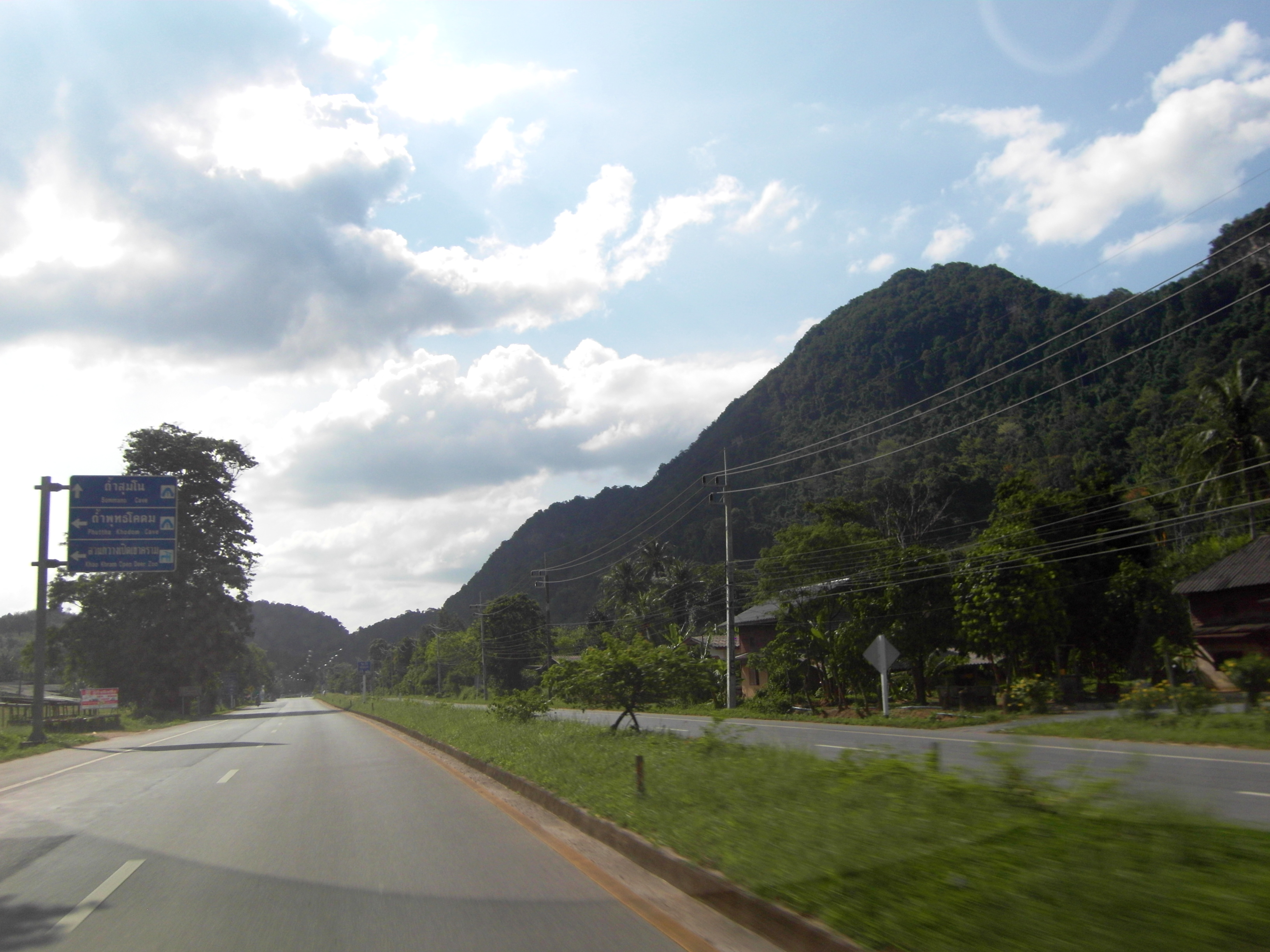
- Thailand route 4

- District location in Phatthalung province
- Coordinates: 7°34′24″N 99°56′30″E
- Country: Thailand
- Province: Phatthalung
- Seat: Chumphon

Area
  - Total: 225.6 km^{2} (87.1 sq mi)

Population (2005)
  - Total: 25,412
  - Density: 112.6/km^{2} (292/sq mi)
- Time zone: UTC+7 (ICT)
- Postal code: 93000
- Geocode: 9311

Srinagarindra (Thai: ศรีนครินทร์, pronounced [sǐː.ná(ʔ).kʰā.rīn]) is a district (amphoe) of Phatthalung province, southern Thailand.

== Geography ==
Neighboring districts are (from the north clockwise) Si Banphot, Khuan Khanun, Mueang Phatthalung, and Kong Ra of Phattalung Province; Yan Ta Khao and Na Yong of Trang province.

== History ==
The minor district (king amphoe) was established on 26 June 1996, when it was split off from Mueang Phatthalung district. The new district became effective on 15 July 1996. At first named Chumphon after the main tambon, it was renamed Srinagarindra on 30 December 1996.

On 15 May 2007, all 81 minor districts were upgraded to full districts. On 24 August, the upgrade became official.

== Administration ==
The district is divided into four sub-districts (tambons), which are further subdivided into 42 villages (mubans). There are no municipal (thesabans). There are four tambon administrative organizations (TAO).

| No. | Name | Thai name | Villages | Pop. |
|---|---|---|---|---|
| 1. | Chumphon | ชุมพล | 14 | 8,195 |
| 2. | Ban Na | บ้านนา | 11 | 7,268 |
| 3. | Ang Thong | อ่างทอง | 8 | 4,246 |
| 4. | Lam Sin | ลำสินธุ์ | 9 | 5,703 |
