= Tamot district =

Tamot ตะโหมด
- District
- District location in Phatthalung province
- Coordinates: 7°20′24″N 100°6′42″E
- Country: Thailand
- Province: Phatthalung
- Seat: Mae Khari

Area
  - Total: 264.2597 km^{2} (102.0312 sq mi)

Population (2005)
  - Total: 27,982
  - Density: 105.9/km^{2} (274/sq mi)
- Time zone: UTC+7 (ICT)
- Postal code: 93160
- Geocode: 9304

Tamot (Thai: ตะโหมด, pronounced [tā.mòːt]) is a district (amphoe) of Phatthalung province, southern Thailand.

== Geography ==
Neighboring districts are (from the north clockwise) Kong Ra, Khao Chaison, Bang Kaeo, and Pa Bon of Phatthalung Province, Palian of Trang province.

== History ==
The district was established on 1 August 1977, when it was split off from Khao Chaison district. It was upgraded to a full district on 20 March 1986.

== Environment ==
As of August 2019, the district is the site of a proposed rock quarry that has been opposed by some environmental groups and locals. Human Rights Watch has reported that opponents of the quarry and journalists covering the story have been threatened and intimidated.

== Administration ==
The district is divided into three sub-districts (tambons), which are further subdivided into 33 villages (mubans). There are two townships (thesaban tambons): Tamot covers parts of tambons Tamot and Khlong Yai, and Mae Khari parts of the same-named tambon. There are a further three tambon administrative organizations (TAO).

No.	Name	Thai name	Villages	Pop.
1.	Mae Khari	แม่ขรี	11	11,514
2.	Tamot	ตะโหมด	12	9,489
3.	Khlong Yai	คลองใหญ่	10	6,979
