= Si Banphot district =

Si Banphot ศรีบรรพต
- District
- District location in Phatthalung province
- Coordinates: 7°43′12″N 99°53′0″E
- Country: Thailand
- Province: Phatthalung
- Seat: Khao Ya

Area
  - Total: 218.504 km^{2} (84.365 sq mi)

Population (2005)
  - Total: 16,465
  - Density: 75.4/km^{2} (195/sq mi)
- Time zone: UTC+7 (ICT)
- Postal code: 93190
- Geocode: 9307

Si Banphot (Thai: ศรีบรรพต, pronounced [sǐː bān.pʰót]), sometimes also spelled Sri Banphot, is a district (amphoe) of Phatthalung province, southern Thailand.

== Geography ==
Neighboring districts are (from the north clockwise) Pa Phayom, Khuan Khanun, and Srinagarindra of Phatthalung Province, Na Yong, Mueang Trang, and Huai Yot of Trang province.

== History ==
The minor district was established on 1 December 1977, when three tambons were split off from Khuan Khanun district. It was upgraded to a full district on 4 November 1993.

== Administration ==
The district is divided into three sub-districts (tambons), which are further subdivided into 30 villages (mubans). There are no municipal (thesaban) areas. There are three tambon administrative organizations (TAO).

| No. | Name | Thai name | Villages | Pop. |
|---|---|---|---|---|
| 1. | Khao Ya | เขาย่า | 10 | 6,262 |
| 2. | Khao Pu | เขาปู่ | 11 | 5,260 |
| 3. | Taphaen | ตะแพน | 9 | 4,943 |
