= Thale Noi Non-Hunting Area =

Protected area in southern Thailand

- Thale Noi Waterfowl Reserve
- IUCN category III (natural monument or feature)
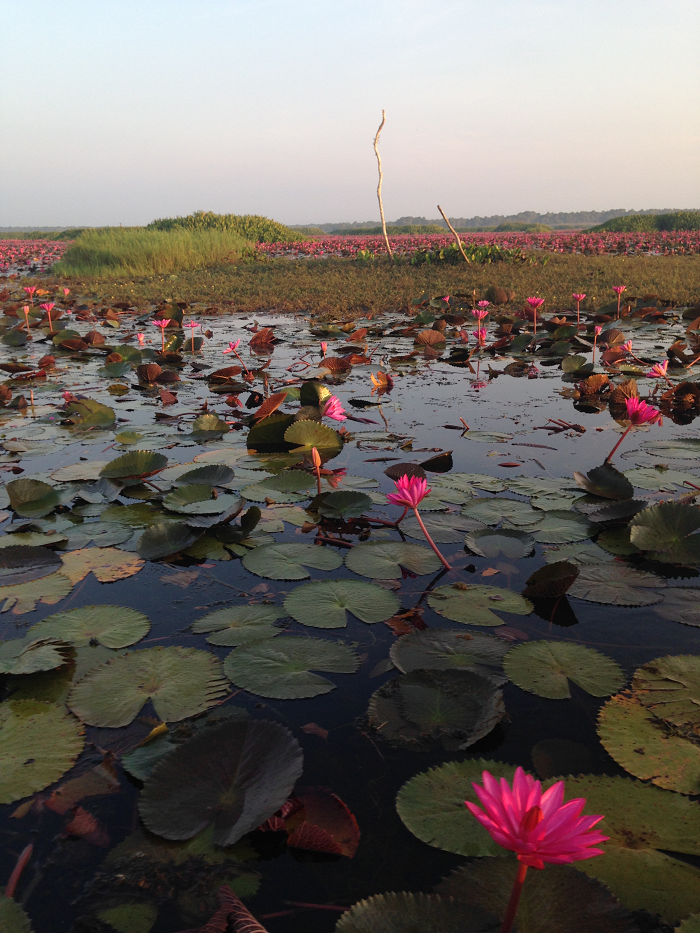
- Thale Noi

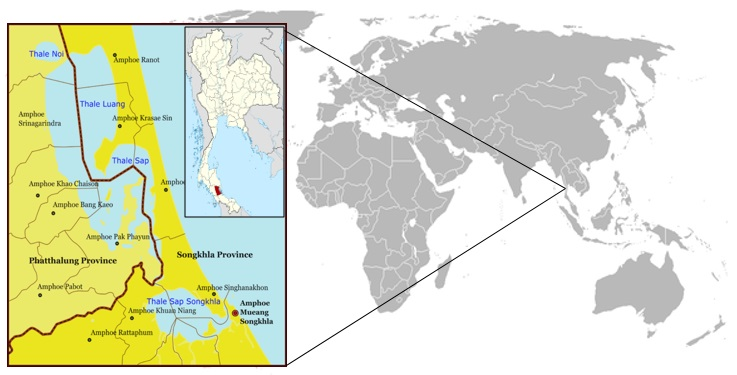
- Thale Noi Locator Map
- Location: Phatthalung Province, Thailand
- Nearest city: Phatthalung
- Coordinates: 7°46′00″N 100°09′11″E
- Area: 460 km^{2} (180 sq mi)
- Established: 29 April 1975 Ramsar Site 13 May 1998
- Governing body: Royal Forestry Department

Ramsar Wetland
- Official name: Kuan Ki Sian of the Thale Noi Non-Hunting Area Wetlands
- Designated: 13 May 1998
- Reference no.: 948

Thale Noi Non-Hunting Area is a protected freshwater wetland located in Phatthalung province, southern Thailand, covering an area of 460 km^{2} (180 sq mi). It is one of the largest natural freshwater lakes in Southeast Asia. It is the smallest, northernmost basin in the chain of lagoons that form Songkhla Lake, spreading across three provincial boundaries into Nakhon Si Thammarat, Phatthalung and Songkhla provinces and is home to the critically endangered Irrawaddy dolphin (Orcaella brevirostris).

== History ==
The Thai name ‘Thale Noi’ translates to ‘little sea’ in English language (thale = sea; noi = little). The wetlands were internationally recognised as a biodiversity hotspot in 1975 when the Department of National Parks, Wildlife & Flora, under the Ministry of National Resources and Environment and in conjunction with the International Union for Conservation of Nature (IUCN) declared it a Protected Area Category III (Natural Monuments), aimed at protecting particular natural features of a small area with high visitor value. The wetlands’ valuable feature is its provision of suitable breeding habitats for tens of thousands of native and migratory bird species. Thale Noi Non-Hunting Area was the first official non-hunting wildlife area declared in Thailand. Furthermore, the Kuan Ki Sian knoll, a 4.94 km^{2} (1.91 sq mi) area within the non-hunting grounds was declared as a ‘Wetland of International Importance’ in 1998 by the Ramsar Convention for its diversity of flora and fauna species, its value as a breeding haven for myriad bird species and for the presence of vulnerable and endangered species inhabiting the area. The wetlands are presently governed by the Royal Forestry Department who work with local authorities and communities to manage the reserve.

== Climate ==
Thale Noi Non-Hunting Area experiences tropical monsoonal weather with little variation in average temperatures throughout the year. There are distinct wet and dry seasons experienced on the southern east coast of Thailand with the rainy season running from October to March and dry season from April to September; November being the wettest month of the year and July being the driest.

== Ecosystem dynamics ==
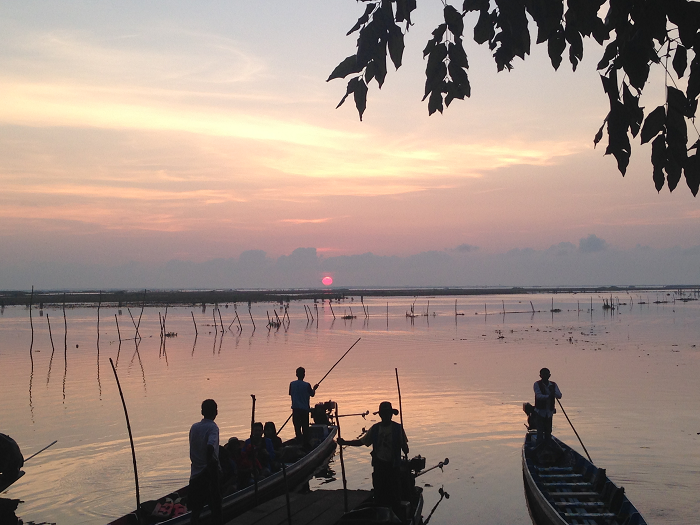
Sunrise boat trips to see blooming lotus at Thale Noi lake.

Thale Noi Non-Hunting Area is part of the greater Songkhla Lake Basin, the largest lagoon lake in Thailand, covering an area of over 8,000 km^{2} (3,100 sq mi) in its entirety. The lake joins with Thale Luang, a 600 km^{2} (230 sq mi) basin, via 3 channels – Khlong Naang Riam, Khlong Ban Klang and Khlong Yuan, however sluice gates were installed in 1956 by the Royal Irrigation Department to prevent salt water intrusion to create freshwater conditions conducive to rice production (see Environmental Threats). Thale Luang adjoins Thale Sap (364 km^{2} (141 sq mi)) which connects to the southernmost lake, Thale Sap Songkhla (182 km^{2} (70 sq mi)) that opens into the Gulf of Thailand through a 380 m wide strait. Approximately 94% (422 km^{2} (163 sq mi)) of the reserve is terrestrial and 6% (28 km^{2} (11 sq mi)) is aquatic. Thale Noi lake is approximately 5 km wide and 6 km long with an average depth of 1.2 m, however water levels fluctuate significantly with changing seasonal conditions, dropping to around 80 cm in dry season and increasing to a depth of 3 m in some areas during the wet season.

Overview lakes of Phatthalung

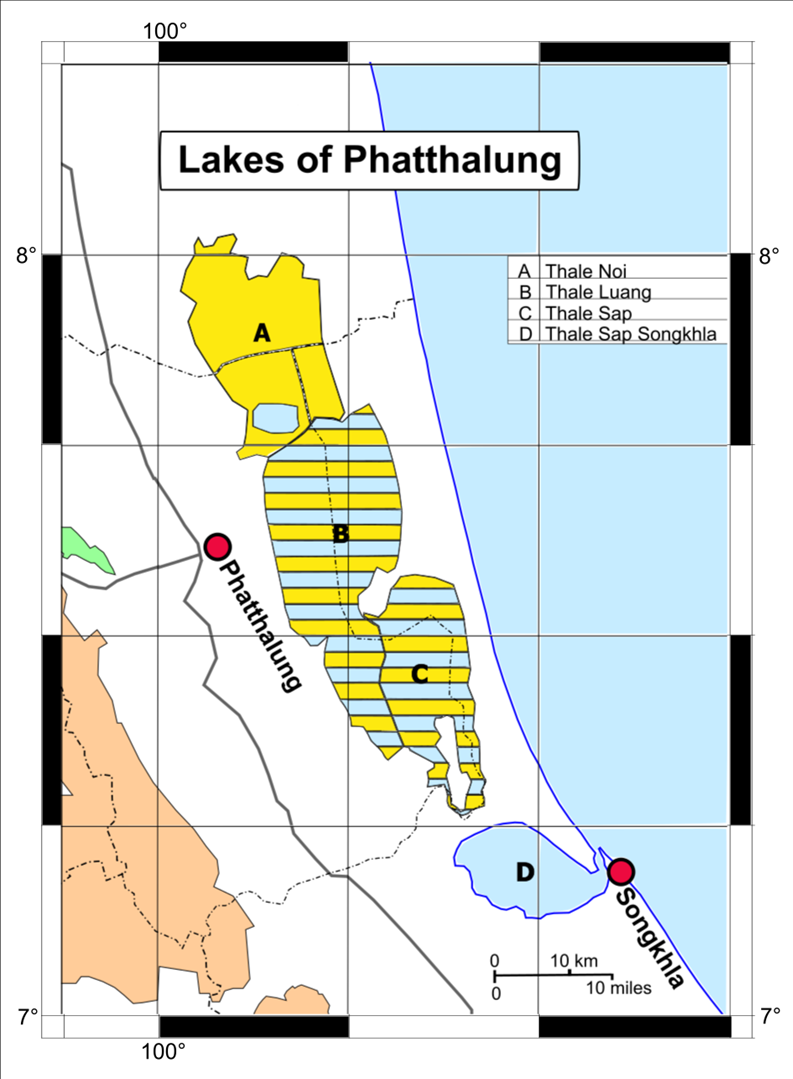
Lakes of Phatthalung

A	Thale Noi
B	Thale Luang
C	Thale Sap
D	Thale Sap Songkhla

Thale Noi Non-Hunting Area is a biologically diverse wetland with multiple habitat types supporting a vast array of flora and fauna species. Dense Melaleuca forests dominate the north and south with extensive rice paddy fields to the east and remaining areas combine swamp marsh, grassland and sedge beds, with only a relatively small area of open water.

Melaleuca forests	170	66
Rice paddies	153	59
Swamp, sedge, grassland	109	42
Open water	28	11

== Wildlife ==
Plant life ranges from Melaleuca swamp forests to floating aquatic macrophytes and microscopic phytoplankton. Records from the late 1990s show there were 72 species of flora in Thale Noi Non-Hunting Area. However more recent studies reveal dramatic reductions in plant populations with only 25 species remaining in the reserve. This loss of biodiversity is due to the heavy impact human populations have had on the area through the over-exploitation of natural resources and pollution into the lake.

The weeping paperbark (Melaleuca leucadendron) and the white samet (Melaleuca cajuputi) bordering both ends of the reserve represent the largest Melaleuca habitat in Thailand.

Other water adapted plant species in the area include the mangrove species Rhizophora apiculata and Sonneratia caseolaris, the nipa palm (Nypa fruticans), Siamese balsa (Alstonia spathulata) and the shore eugenia (Syzygium antisepticum), which all contribute to ecosystem stability for maintaining soil composition, food sources, sanctuary and breeding grounds for both terrestrial and aquatic species. Macrophytes provide important habitats for birds, otters and other wildlife. These include reeds Phragmites, sedges (Cyperus), Scleria, Scirpus, Eleocharis, rice grass (Paspalum scrobiculatum), sacred lotus (Nelumbo nucifera), white lotus (Nymphaea lotus), blue lotus (Nymphaea nouchali), water snowflake (Nymphoides indica), Asian watermoss (Salvinia cucullata), golden bladderwort (Utricularia aurea), hornwort (Ceratophyllum demersum), green algae (Chara) and myriad other phytoplankton. Many macrophyte populations form dense floating patches on the lake surface providing refuge and habitat for both mobile and sessile organisms.

Over-exploitation of the grey sedge Lepironia articulata in the Thale Noi region has led to shortages in supply for local communities who depend on the plant as a primary source of income. This species is intensely harvested by over 1,000 local families with more than 70% women who use the stems for weaving mats, baskets, bags and other handicraft items for sale. The cultivation of the grey sedge in the Thale Noi Non-Hunting Area does not require legal land tenure and little financial outlay. The sacred lotus is harvested extensively for food, medicine and religious ceremonies. Thai people use all parts of this species for myriad uses including the rhizomes, stems, leaves, petals, pods and seeds in cooking; the flowers and leaves for Buddhist rituals; and the leaves, pods, petioles, stamens and pollen for treating a variety of ailments such as sinusitis, diabetes and fever. Leaves from the Pandanus plant (Pandanus amaryllifolius) are commonly used throughout Thailand for flavouring dishes and adding natural green colouring to drinks and sweets, and is used as a traditional medicine for treating diabetes.

=== Amphibians ===
Amphibian species present in Thale Noi Non-Hunting Area are black-spectacled toad (Bufo melanostictus), pointed-tongued floating frog (Occidozyga lima), common green frog (Hylarana erythrae), Chinese bullfrog (Rana rugosa), white-lipped tree frog (Polypedates leucomystax), Burmese squat frog (Calluella guttulata) and the Malaysian narrowmouth toad (Kaloula pulchra).

=== Fish and shellfish ===
There are mixed reports to the number of fish species found in Thale Noi Lake with some ranging from 45 species to other much lower figures of 26 species. It is likely that many species have been lost from the wetlands due to habitat conversion, pollution and fragmentation resulting from agricultural expansion and industrialisation, however more research is required to quantify the extent of loss. Siamese Fighting Fish (Betta splendens), once common in the Thale Noi Non-Hunting Area are facing declining populations due to habitat destruction from land conversion, pollution and over-exploitation in the pet trade. This species is commonly bred in Thailand for the purpose of betting on aggressive fighting male individuals and for their attractive colouring. A secondary threat, as a consequence of the international trade of this species, is genetic erosion resulting from privately bred stock being released into wild areas. This loss of genetic diversity increases the risk of local extinctions as populations become less adapted to survive in changing environments. It is reported that Prophagorus niuhofi, Walking Catfish, native to Thailand were previously found at Thale Noi, however there is no recent literature available on the distribution of this species in the area. The Giant Sword Minnow (Macrochirichthys macrochirus) was once also found in Thale Noi Non-Hunting Area however is now extirpated due to its sensitivities to pollution and gillnet fishing.

Other non-threatened aquatic species present in the wetlands include several economically valuable species including snakehead (Channa), climbing perch (Anabas testudineus), several catfish species, grey featherback (Notopterus notopterus), swamp eel, and the freshwater prawn species Macrobrachium lanchesteri" and "Macrobrachium rosenbergii.

=== Reptiles ===
There are 25 recorded species of reptiles in Thale Noi Non-Hunting Area including the Southeast Asian box turtle (Cuora amboinensis), the giant Asian pond turtle (Heosemys grandis), black marsh turtle (Siebenrockiella crassicollis) and the Southeast Asia softshell turtle (Amyda cartilaginea). Populations of these species have declined in Thailand due to extensive habitat loss from land conversion into rice fields, rubber tree plantations and shrimp farms. The four-toed terrapin (Batagur baska), a semi-aquatic species that lives in terrestrial and freshwater habitats, once occurred in Thale Noi Non-Hunting Area, but is now extinct in Thailand.

The two monitor species present in the wetlands, the clouded monitor (Varanus nebulosus) and the Asian water monitor (Varanus salvator) are protected in Thailand under the Wild Animal Reservation & Protection Act (WARPA). Other reptile species include elephant trunk snake (Acrochordus javanicus), reticulated python (Python reticulatus), banded krait (Bungarus fasciatus), monocled cobra (Naja kaouthia), striped water snake (Enhydris enhydris), rice paddy snake (Enhydris plumbea), puff-faced water snake (Homalopsis buccata) and several species of common terrestrial and water snakes, skinks and garden lizards.

=== Mammals ===
There are 10 recorded species of mammals inhabiting the Thale Noi Non-Hunting Area. The Asian small-clawed otter (Aonyx cinerea) and the smooth-coated otter (Lutra perspicillata) are considered bioindicators of wetland ecosystems, Other mammal species include the long-tailed macaque (Macaca fascicularis), Malayan horseshoe bat (Rhinolophus malayanus), Asian palm civet (Paradoxurus hermaphroditus), Javan mongoose (Urva javanicus), plantain squirrel (Callosciurus notatus), greater bandicoot rat (Bandicota indica) and Polynesian rat (Rattus exulans). There are also over 4,000 water buffalo (Bubalus bubalis) farmed by about 280 families, and many bird species use grazing areas for feeding and breeding sites.

=== Birds ===
Thale Noi Non-Hunting Area provides habitat and breeding grounds for over 180 native and migratory bird species that use the wetlands all year round or on their annual migratory journeys, including cormorants, waders, herons, egrets, crakes, bitterns, terns, grebes and kites. The flood tolerant trees provide protective breeding grounds for native waterbirds such as the little cormorant (Phalocrocorax niger), purple heron (Ardea purpurea) and other common bird species with annual breeding cycles including the little egret (Egretta garzetta), black-crowned night heron (Nycticorax nycticorax) and cattle egret (Bubulcus ibis). The thick foliage of the Melaleuca forests also provides night roosting areas for migratory bird species such as the black-headed ibis (Threskiornis melanocephalus).

== Environmental threats ==
The conversion of wetlands into agricultural and industrial lands is the most significant threat to biodiversity in Thailand. Habitat destruction, fragmentation, pollution and overexploitation of the Thale Noi Non-Hunting Area has reduced populations of flora and fauna species with continuing risks of extirpation. Smaller populations result in declining genetic diversity of native species in the area, consequently losing their capacity to adapt to changing environmental conditions. Shrimp cultivation in the Songkhla Lake Basin alone rose from ~35 km2 in 1982 to ~78 km^{2} in 2000 changing the landscape from fertile wetland habitat to polluted and degraded water and soil resources over time. Clearing of mangrove forests in the protected area has also been reported with a reduction of over 87% land cover which leads to the destabilisation of the shoreline and significant loss of nursery areas for aquatic species. Deforestation of both Melaleuca and mangrove forests bordering Thale Noi lake has increased soil erosion and runoff resulting in extensive sedimentation, that has caused water levels to drop by ~10 cm every year increasing fish mortality.

The construction of sluice gates at the northern part of Thale Luang in 1956 ceased the flow of saline water into Thale Noi lake, creating a freshwater biome that had significant impacts on the ecosystem. Reducing or eliminating connectivity between the larger lake system and Thale Noi lake affected the feeding and breeding cycles of fish and other aquatic fauna which consequently impacted the entire food web. Reports of increased weed infestation has also been documented as a result of limited salt-water intrusions that previously reduced populations.

Eutrophication has been recorded in areas close to human settlements as a consequence of pollutants entering the wetlands from households and industry. Unaware or unconcerned with the impacts of environmental degradation on the ecosystem, runoff from rubber and food production industries and surrounding pig, shrimp and crop farms are additional sources of pollution contaminating the area.

== Management ==
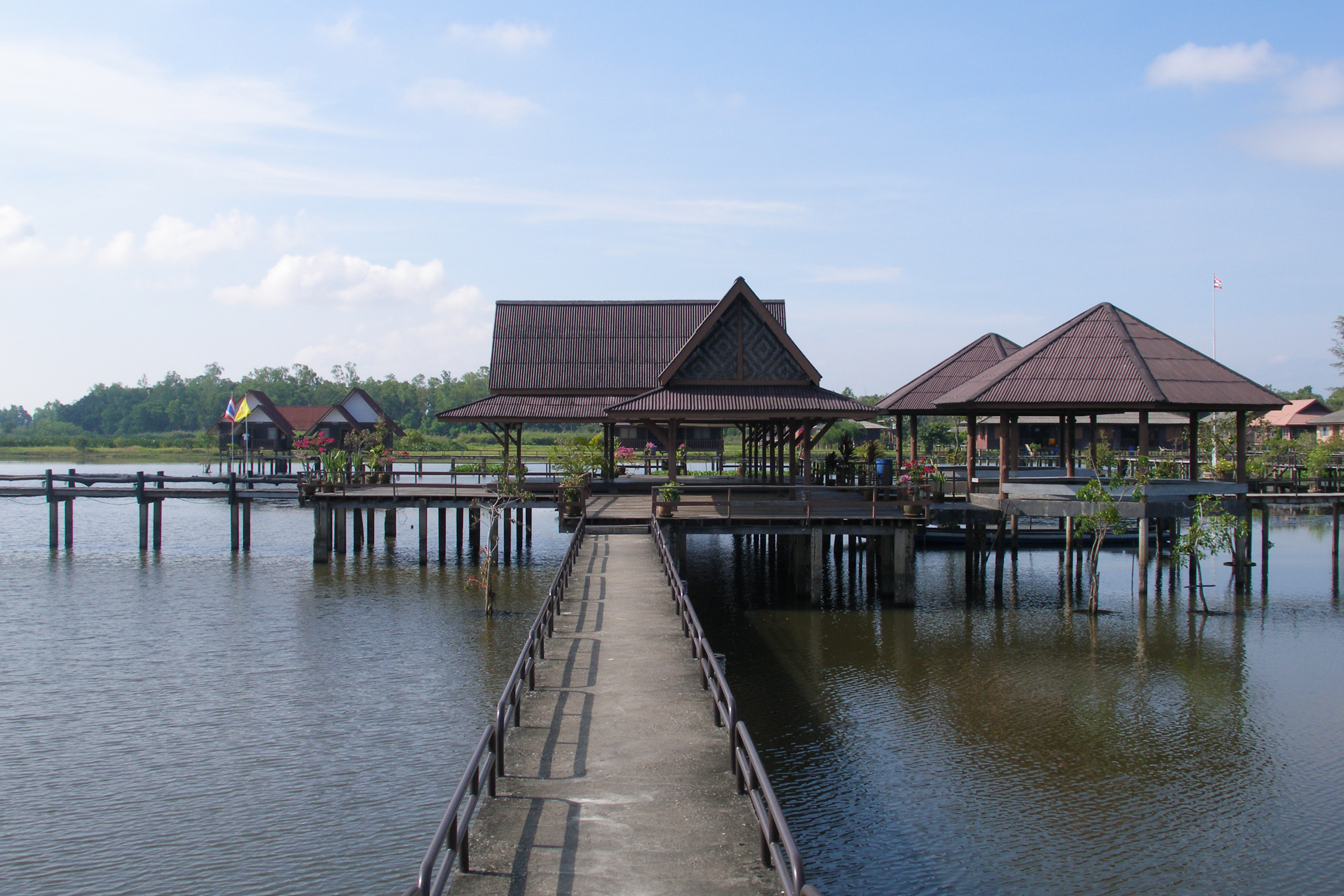
Houses of National Park on Thale Noi lake

Thale Noi Non-Hunting Area provides an array of valuable ecosystem services to local communities whose economy revolves almost explicitly around exploiting the lake's resources.

Freshwater wetlands are particularly vulnerable to human activities due to their disproportionate abundance of flora and fauna in both terrestrial and aquatic areas for refuge and habitat. Education, training and enforcement of environmental protection laws needs to be more effective to ensure sustainable methods of cultivating and harvesting natural resources within the wetlands cause no further loss of biodiversity. Weak enforcement of regulations, lack of coordinated programming and inadequate data collection and record keeping have previously been identified as key issues of concern in the management of this ecosystem, however it is unknown if these problems have been addressed in recent times. Immediate management concerns should focus on preserving biodiversity, improving water quality, preserving fishery resources and resolving social conflicts arising from resource usage in the area.

The impact of climate change, particularly on wetlands, is steadily increasing, changing rainfall patterns, increasing storm frequency and intensity, impacting all levels of biological and ecological systems. Dedicated management strategies are required to address these issues and the impact on Thale Noi Non-Hunting Area.
