= Phatthalung province =

Coordinates: 7°36′56″N 100°04′22″E

Phatthalung พัทลุง
- Province

Other transcription(s)
  - Southern Thai: พัทลุง (pronounced [pāt̚.tʰàʔ.lûŋ]) เมืองลุง (pronounced [mɯ̀aːŋ.lûŋ])
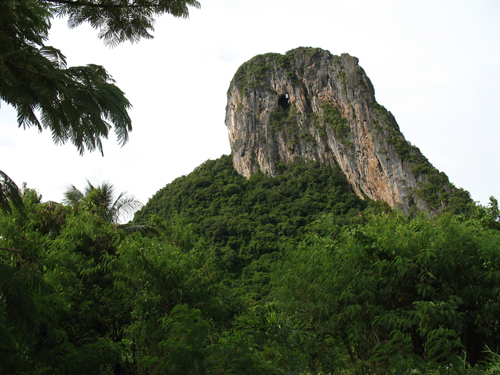
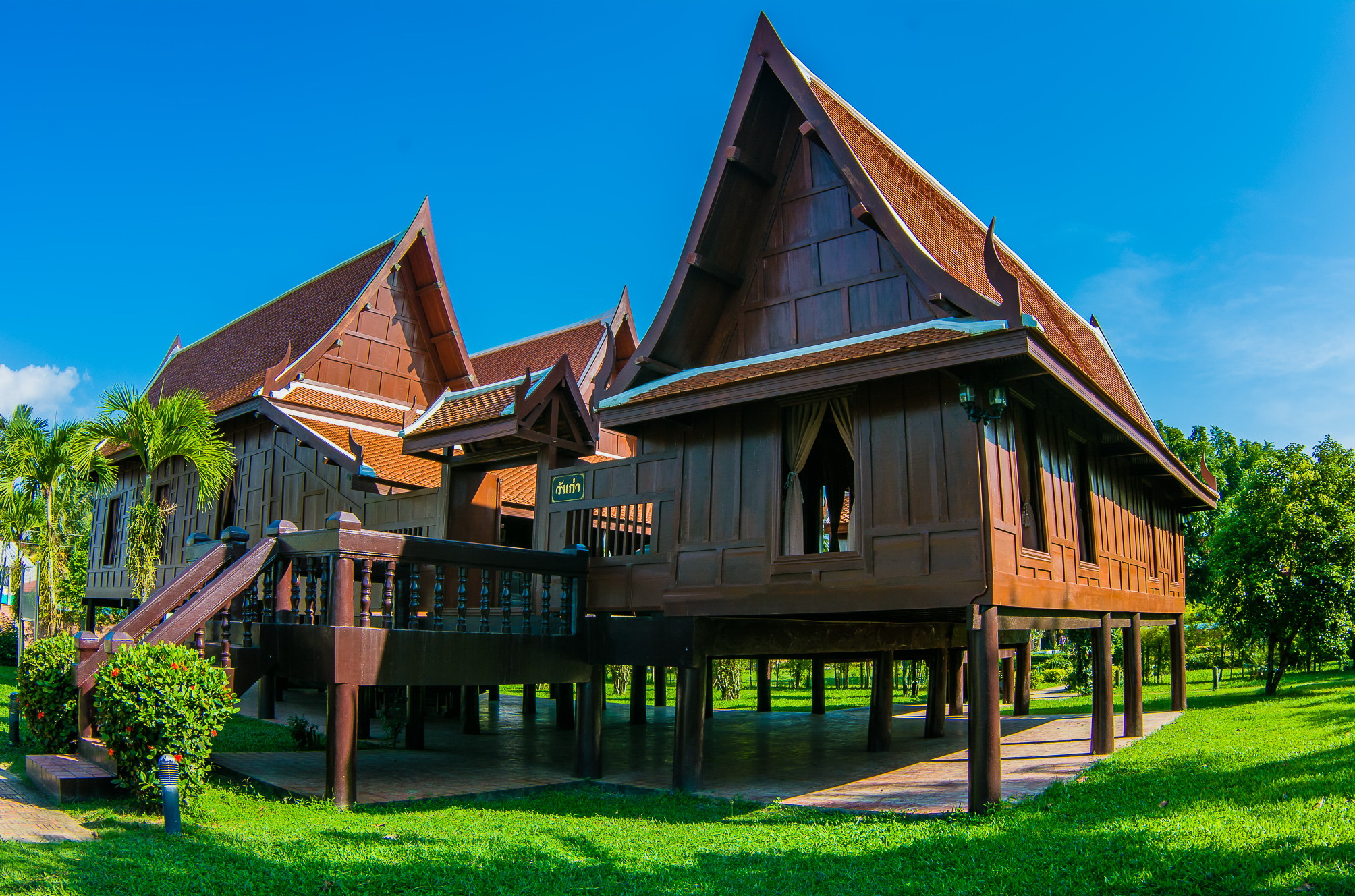
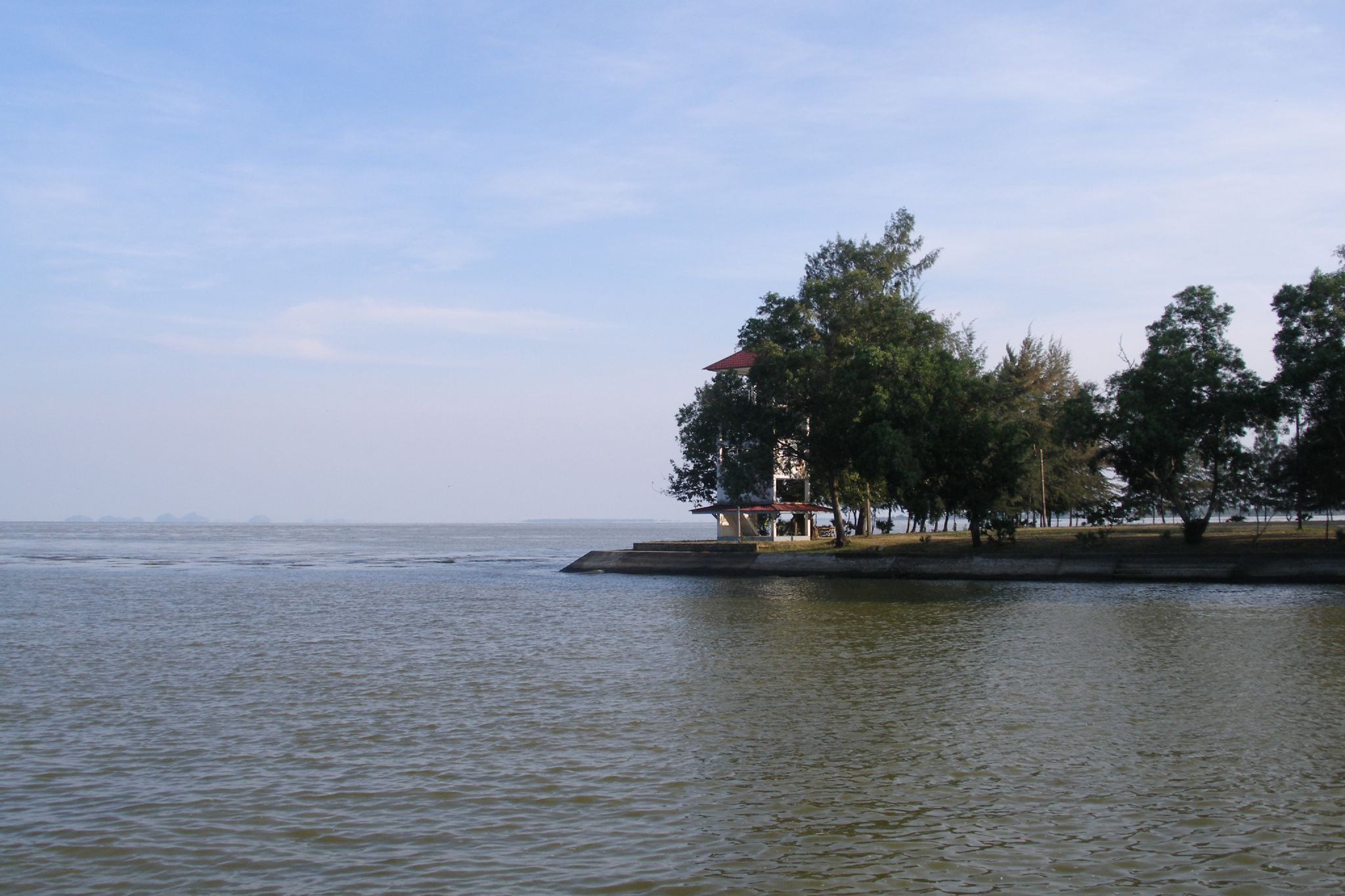
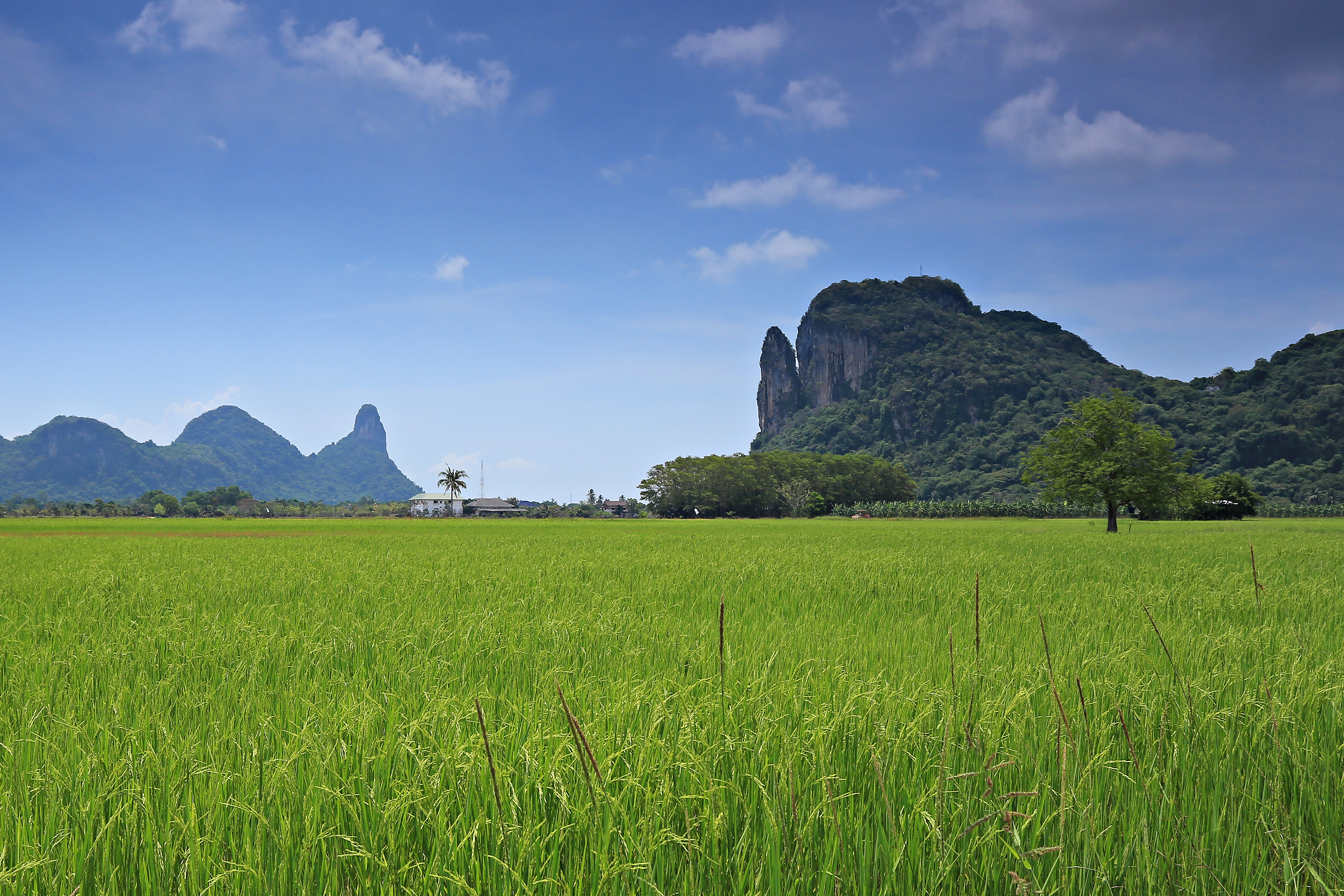
- Khao Ok Thalu, Wang Chao Mueang Phatthalung, Thale Noi Non-Hunting Area, Ancient monument

- Flag Seal
- Nickname: Mueang Lung
- Mottoes: เมืองหนังโนราห์ อู่นาข้าว พราวน้ำตก แหล่งนกน้ำ ทะเลสาบงาม เขาอกทะลุ น้ำพุร้อน ("The City of Nora. Rich in rice paddies. Dazzling waterfalls. Source of water birds. Beautiful lakes. Ok Thalu Mountain. Hot water springs.")
- Map of Thailand highlighting Phatthalung province
- Country: Thailand
- Capital: Phatthalung

Government
  - Type: Province and Provincial Administrative Organization
  - Body: Phatthalung Province and Phatthalung Provincial Administrative Organization
  - Governor: Ratthasat Chitchu
  - PAO Chief Executive: Wisut Thammaphet

Area
  - Total: 3,861 km^{2} (1,491 sq mi)
  - Rank: 56th

Population (2024)
  - Total: ▼519,440
  - Rank: 50th
  - Density: 135/km^{2} (350/sq mi)
  - Rank: 31st

Human Achievement Index
  - HAI (2022): 0.6242 "low" Ranked 63rd

GDP
  - Total: baht 36 billion (US$1.2 billion) (2019)
- Time zone: UTC+7 (ICT)
- Postal code: 93xxx
- Calling code: 074
- ISO 3166 code: TH-93
- Website: phatthalung.go.th phatthalungpao.go.th

Phatthalung (Thai: พัทลุง, pronounced [pʰát̚.tʰā.lūŋ]) is one of the southern provinces (changwat) of Thailand. Neighboring provinces are (from north clockwise) Nakhon Si Thammarat, Songkhla, Satun, and Trang. Phatthalung is essentially a landlocked province, one of the only two in southern Thailand, the other being Yala.

The province lies between the Banthat Mountains and Songkhla Lake, and its older Malay name was Mardelong. Two of the hill temples and holy caves of the upper peninsula, Khao Ok Thalu and Khao Khuha Sawan, are in the province. Phatthalung was one of the twelve royal cities of Ayutthaya and was moved to its present site in 1924.

== History ==
Two of the twenty-six hill temples and holy caves that Phanuwat Ueasaman recorded across six provinces of the upper south lie in Phatthalung, at Khao Ok Thalu and Khao Khuha Sawan. In that survey Hindu communities held hilltops over long periods, while Buddhists more often used a cave already in use to inter votive tablets and votive stupas.

Phatthalung was formerly known as Mardelong (Jawi: مردلوڠ) in Malay, especially during the time when the region came under Malay-Muslim influence.

Phatthalung became one of twelve royal cities during the reign of King Ramathibodi I of the Ayutthaya Kingdom in the 14th century. At the end of the 18th century, King Rama I submitted the city to the Ministry of Defense, which was responsible for all the southern provinces. In 1896, during the administrative reforms of King Chulalongkorn, Phatthalung became part of the Monthon Nakhon Si Thammarat. In 1924, King Rama VI ordered to move the city of Phatthalung to the present-day Khuha Sawan Subdistrict.

== Symbols ==
The provincial seal shows the 177 meter high Phu Khao Ok Thalu mountain, the symbol of the province. The provincial tree and flower is the sweet shorea (Shorea roxburghii). The provincial aquatic life is the tinfoil barb (Barbonymus schwanenfeld), also known locally as pla lam-pam (Thai: ปลาลำปำ), the eponymous of the striking local water source Songkhla Lake, or known in Phatthalung as Lam Pam Lake or Thale Noi and Phatthalung Lake.

== Geography ==
The province is on the Malay Peninsula. It borders to the east the large and shallow Songkhla Lake, and to the west the Nakhon Si Thammarat mountain range. Khao Pu–Khao Ya National Park is at the border with Trang. Forests cover 628 km^{2} (242 sq mi), or 16.3 percent of the province's area.

=== National park ===
In Phatthalung province there is one national park, along with two other national parks, make up region 6 (Songkhla) of Thailand's protected areas. (Visitors in Fiscal year 2024).

Khao Pu–Khao Ya National Park	694 km^{2} (268 sq mi)	(87,155)

=== Wildlife sanctuary ===
There are two wildlife sanctuaries in region 6 (Songkhla), of which one is in Phatthalung province.

Khao Banthat Wildlife Sanctuary	1,267 km^{2} (489 sq mi)

=== Non-hunting areas ===
There are a total of seven non-hunting areas in region 6 (Songkhla), of which three are in Phatthalung province.

Thale Luang Non-Hunting Area	600 km^{2} (230 sq mi)
Thale Noi Non-Hunting Area	457 km^{2} (176 sq mi)
Thale Sap Non-Hunting Area	364 km^{2} (141 sq mi)

Location protected areas of Phatthalung

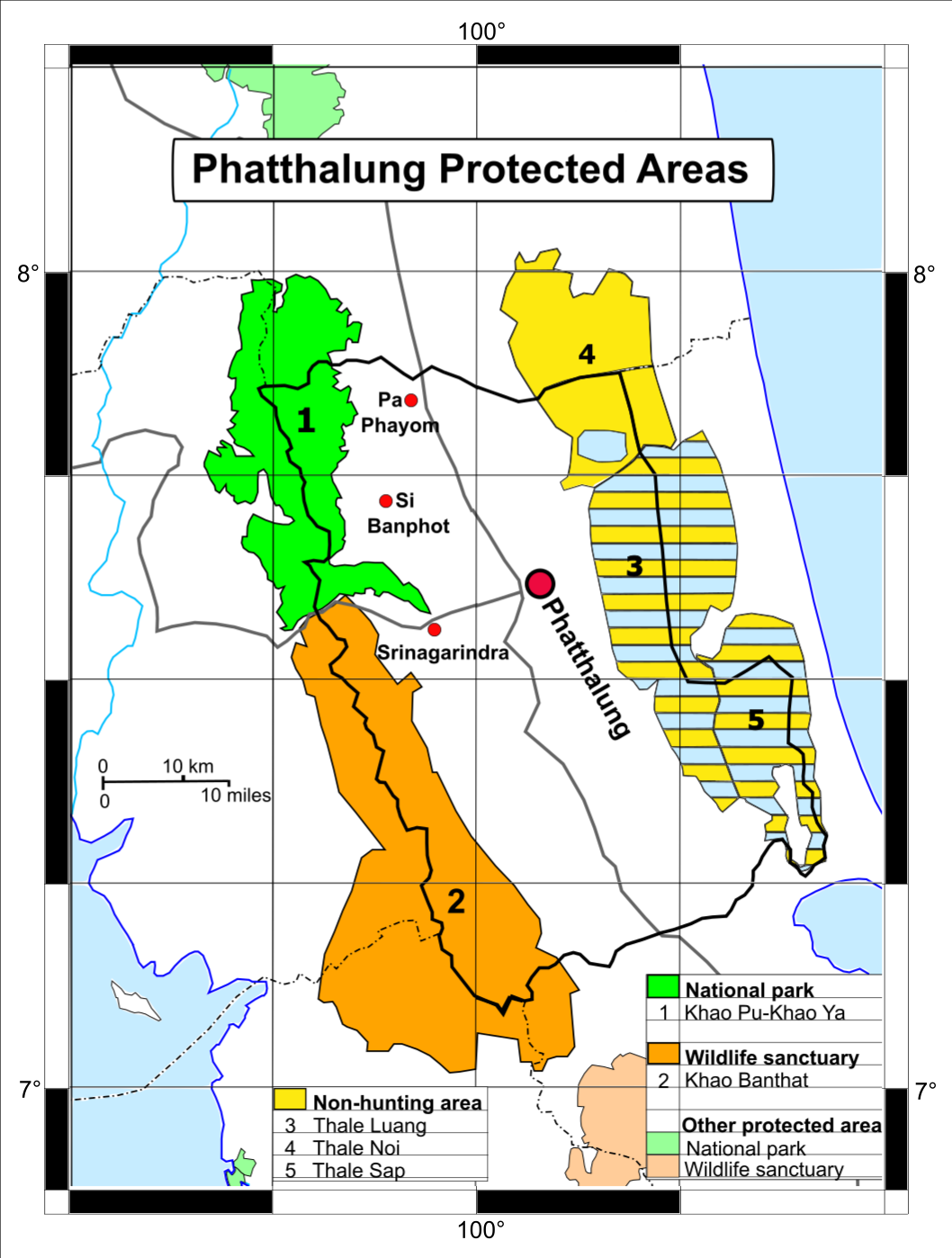
Phatthalung protected areas

	National park
1	Khao Pu- Khao Ya

	Wildlife sanctuary
2	Khao Banthat

	Non-hunting area
3	Thale Luang
4	Thale Noi
5	Thale Sap

== Demographics ==
The majority of the province's populace are Thai Buddhists. Muslims account for 11.1 percent of the population. Many of Phatthalung's Muslims have some ethnic Malay ancestry, but over the centuries they had intermarried with the Thais and adopted Thai cultural norms.
Of the remaining 0.3%, the following religions are: Christianity 0.2% Sikhism 0.1% Confucianism 0.02% and Hinduism 0.2%.

Religion in Phatthalung
1. Buddhism (88.0%)
2. Islam (11.7%)
3. Other religions (0.30%)

== Transport ==
=== Air ===
Phatthalung does not have an airport. The nearest airport is Trang Airport, which is 66 km from the center of Phatthalung.

=== Rail ===
The main station in the province is the Phatthalung Railway Station.

== Administrative divisions ==
=== Provincial government ===
Phatthalung is divided into 11 districts (amphoes). The districts are further divided into 65 subdistricts (tambons) and 626 villages (mubans).

Map of 11 districts	Number	Name	Thai	Malay	Jawi
Map of 11 districts	1	Mueang Phatthalung	เมืองพัทลุง	Bandaraya Mardelong	بنداراي ماردلوڠ
Map of 11 districts	2	Kong Ra	กงหรา	Tiang Katung Ria	تياڠ کاتوڠ ريا
Map of 11 districts	3	Khao Chaison	เขาชัยสน	Gunung Sanubar Jaya	ڬونوڠ صنوبر جاي
Map of 11 districts	4	Tamot	ตะโหมด	Toh Mod	توه مود
Map of 11 districts	5	Khuan Khanun	ควนขนุน	Bukit Nangka	بوكيت نڠك
Map of 11 districts	6	Pak Phayun	ปากพะยูน	Daksina	دقسينا
Map of 11 districts	7	Si Banphot	ศรีบรรพต	Seri Ancala	سري انچال
Map of 11 districts	8	Pa Bon	ป่าบอน	Hutan Keladi	هوتن كلادي
Map of 11 districts	9	Bang Kaeo	บางแก้ว	Kampung Permata	كامڤوڠ ڤرمات
Map of 11 districts	10	Pa Phayom	ป่าพะยอม	Hutan Meranti Temak Nipis	هوتن مرنتي تماق نيڤيس
Map of 11 districts	11	Srinagarindra	ศรีนครินทร์	Seri Inderapura	سري ايندراڤورا

=== Local government ===
As of 26 November 2019 there are: one Phatthalung Provincial Administration Organisation (ongkan borihan suan changwat) and 49 municipal (thesaban) areas in the province. Phatthalung has town (thesaban mueang) status. Further 48 subdistrict municipalities (thesaban tambon). The non-municipal areas are administered by 24 Subdistrict Administrative Organisations - SAO (ongkan borihan suan tambon).

== Tourism ==
=== Sights ===
Phraya Thukkharat (Chuai) Monument (อนุสาวรีย์พระยาทุกขราษฎร์ (ช่วย)) - Phraya Thukkharat was a former monk known as Phra Maha Chuai. During the Nine Armies War in the reign of King Rama I, then Phra Maha Chuai had assisted Phraya Phatthalung, who had led a force of villagers to defeat an invading Burmese army. Later, when he had left the monkhood, he was awarded the royal title Phraya Thukkharat and was an assistant to the city's ruler.

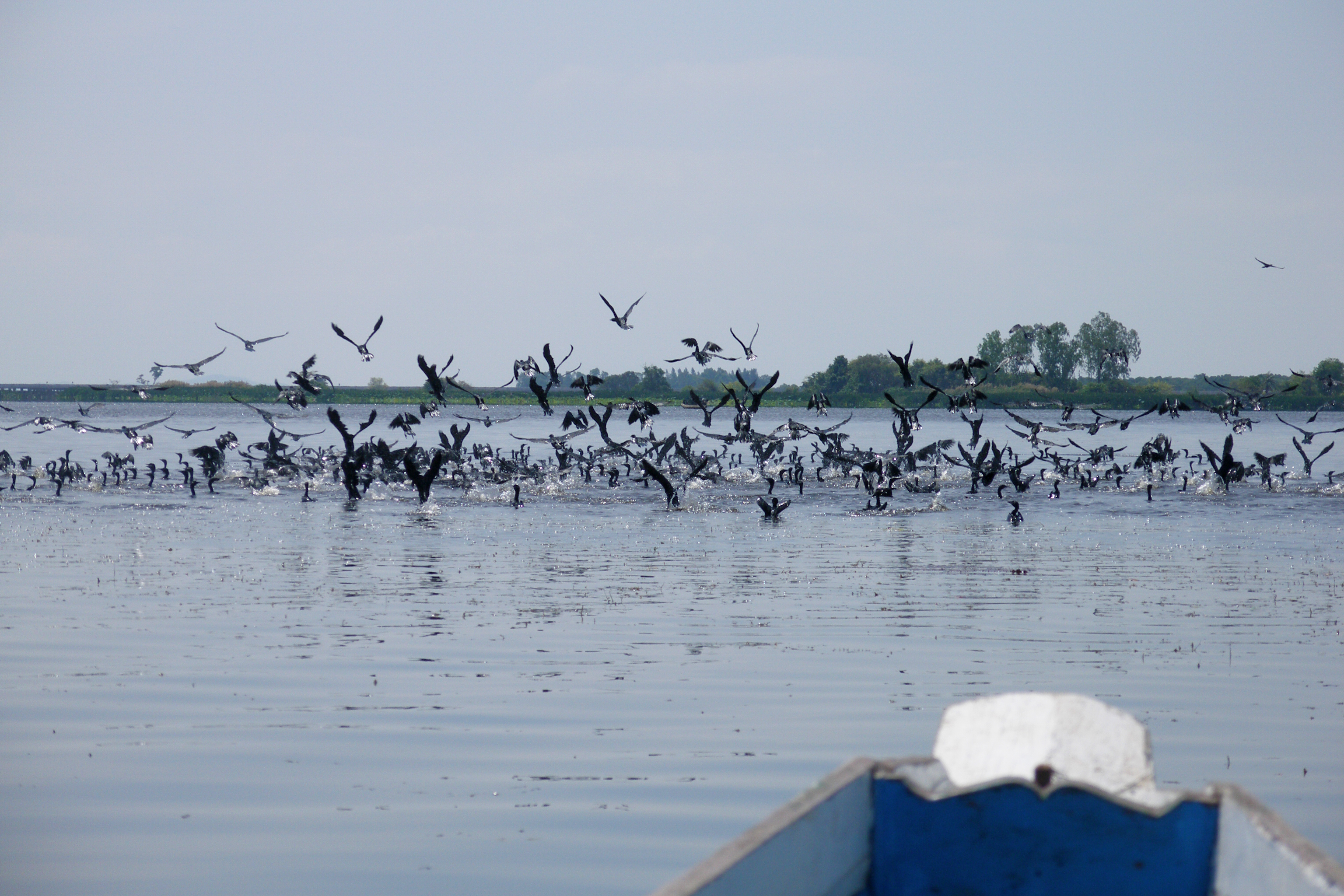
Thale Noi lake

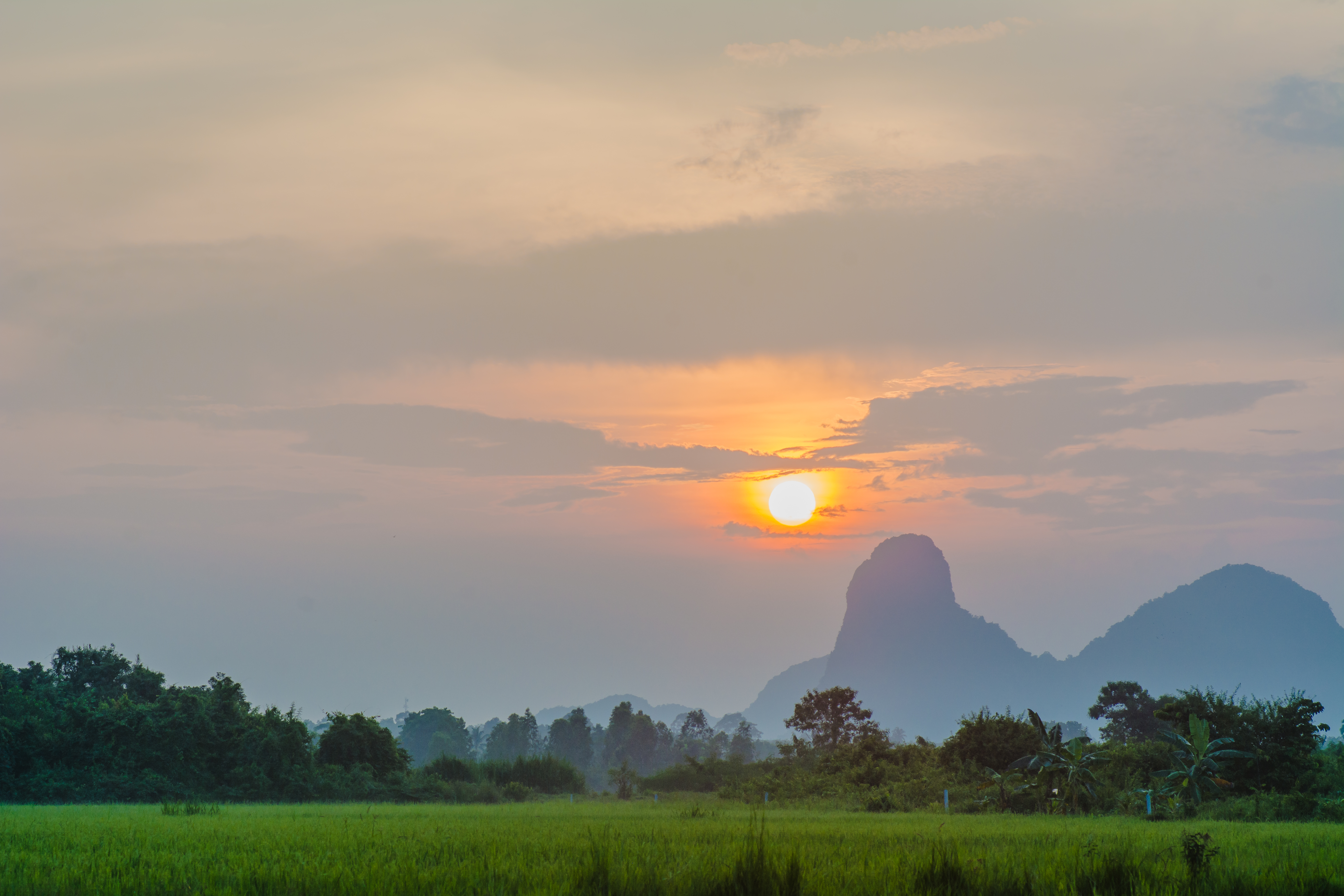
Ok Thalu Mountain

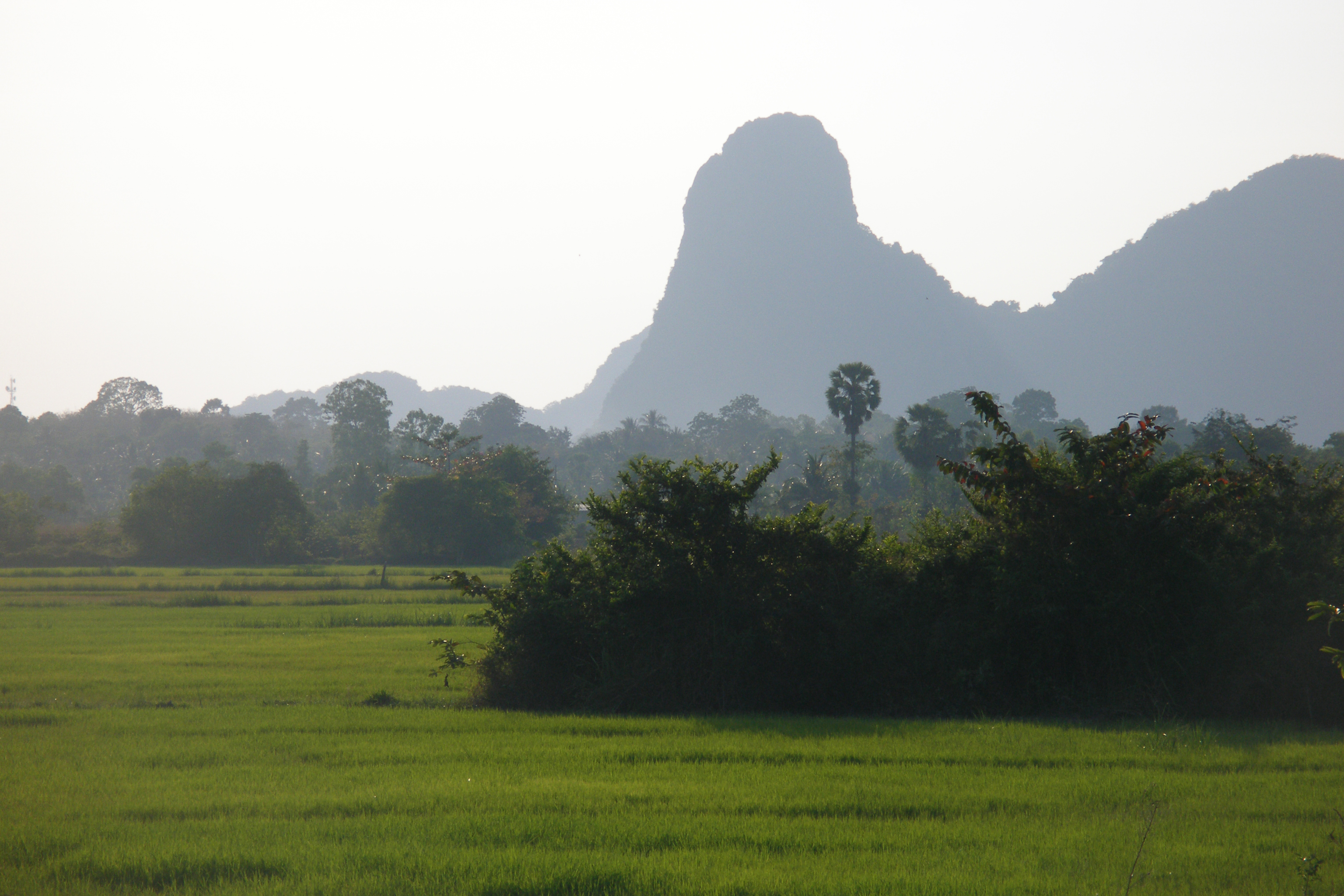
Limestone formations around Khao Pu–Khao Ya National Park

== Culture ==
- Manora or Nora (มโนราห์หรือโนรา) A local performing art in the south. It was an influence from the south of India, together with Lakhon Chatri (theatrical show by males). However, some dancing patterns were changed to match folk cultures in each province. There are 12 major dancing patterns. The patterns are done to lyrics sung by the dancers, either impromptu or composed in advance.
- Talung (ตะลุง) (shadow plays) is a popular folk performance of the south. Talung puppets are made of dried cattle hide, cut beautifully into the characters of each shadow play. The puppets are usually painted black and each of them is held firmly between split bamboo slats called "mai tap". A puppet's mouth and hands will move in accordance with the narration. A Talung ensemble comprises the puppet masters (who are also the vocalists) and a band, totalling no more than eight persons. The musical instruments include pipes, drums, phon (a special kind of drum), and a gong.
- Khaeng Phon Lak Phra (แข่งโพนลากพระ) A type of Chak Phra or Lak Phra, a religious tradition in the south, but in Phatthalung it has different characteristics from other provinces. This festival is held on the full moon of the 11th month according to the Thai lunar calendar. The festival celebrates the ending of the Buddhist lent (Wan Ok Phansa). According to local tradition, the believers carry the Buddha statues from the temples to the river and back. Several parades are held. In every parade drummers that represent one of the shrines in the city participate. In addition to the colored parades, various culture events take place like; drumming contests between the temples, dance shows, Buddha parades contests, water sports contests on Songkhla Lake, various exhibitions, etc. The type of drum used is called "Taphon" or simply "Phon". Hence the name of the festival.

== Human achievement index 2022 ==
Health	Education	Employment	Income
66	26	70	56
Housing	Family	Transport	Participation
50	74	19	15
Province Phatthalung, with an HAI 2022 value of 0.6242 is "low", occupies place 63 in the ranking.

Since 2003, United Nations Development Programme (UNDP) in Thailand has tracked progress on human development at sub-national level using the Human achievement index (HAI), a composite index covering all the eight key areas of human development. National Economic and Social Development Board (NESDB) has taken over this task since 2017.

Rank	Classification
1 - 13	"high"
14 - 29	"somewhat high"
30 - 45	"average"
46 - 61	"somewhat low"
62 - 77	"low"

Map with provinces and HAI 2022 rankings
