= Mae Thom =

Subdistrict in Bang Klam district, Songkhla province, Thailand

Coordinates: 7.0947°N 100.4701°E

Mae Thom (Thai: แม่ทอม) is a subdistrict (Tambon) in Bang Klam District, Songkhla, Thailand. The subdistrict is located on the north side of Hat Yai, on the west bank of the Khlong U-Tapao River. As of 2012, the subdistrict has a population of 2,268.

The village itself is even older than Hat Yai, as it used to be the gateway for upstream migration from the Songkhla Lake and the ocean in ancient times. From available records, the area started to be populated around 17th century by people from other areas around Songkla Lake, Chinese immigrants, and Muslims from both Malay Peninsula and Persia. Until recently, villagers had been self-sufficient in producing and consuming within the village. Now, they are part of the urban and world economies. Villagers no longer work the land for a living. Paddy fields and plantations have been left uncultivated for many years. They become wage earners at factories and other business establishments in the cities.

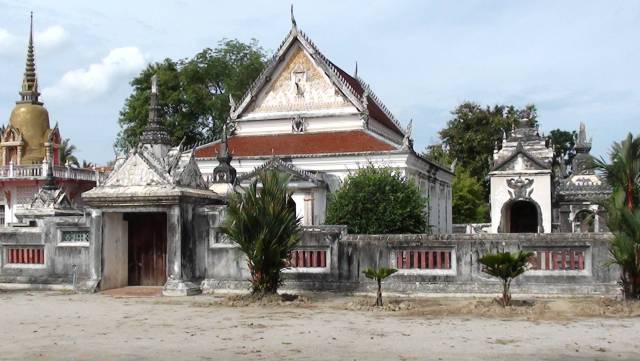

The first community institution, a Buddhist temple, was founded approximately in 1760. It was in Nong Hin, used as a cemetery after the temple was moved to higher ground to avoid flooding. It was moved to where it is now in 1890 and received the name “Wat Kutao”. It became the first Buddhist temple in the area. The new location is on the west bank of Khlong-U-Tapao River, more convenient for transportation. “Ubosot”, the official sacred place for Buddhist monks to perform religious ceremony, was not finished until 1902.

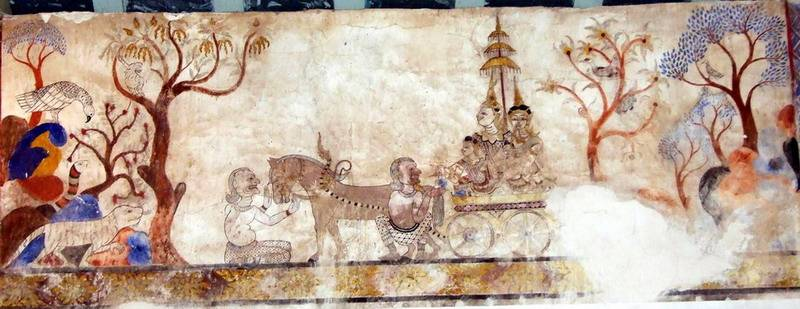

Wall paintings inside are essentially the masterpiece, reflecting capability of local artists at that time. It depicted the tale of Vessantara, the king who gave up everything he owned to pave the way for achieving enlightenment. It was done at the same time of the construction of the building. Even though the paint was chipped and faded away over the period of over 150 years, it still retains great beauty, imagination, and wisdom of self-taught local artists.

== Administration ==
The subdistrict is divided into 6 administrative villages (Muban).

No.	Name	Thai
1.	Ban Nong Hin	บ้านหนองหิน
2.	Ban Mae Thom Tok	บ้านแม่ทอมตก
3.	Ban Hua Non Wat	บ้านหัวนอนวัด
4.	Ban Mae Thom Ok	บ้านแม่ทอมออก
5.	Ban Na Rak Nok Nuea	บ้านนารักนกเหนือ
6.	Ban Na Rak Nok Tai	บ้านนารักนกใต้

The Mae Thom Subdistrict Administrative Organization is the local government responsible for the subdistrict.
