= Hat Yai =

Hat Yai หาดใหญ่
- Municipality
- City of Hat Yai เทศบาลนครหาดใหญ่

Other transcription(s)
  - Chinese: 合艾 (Simplified)
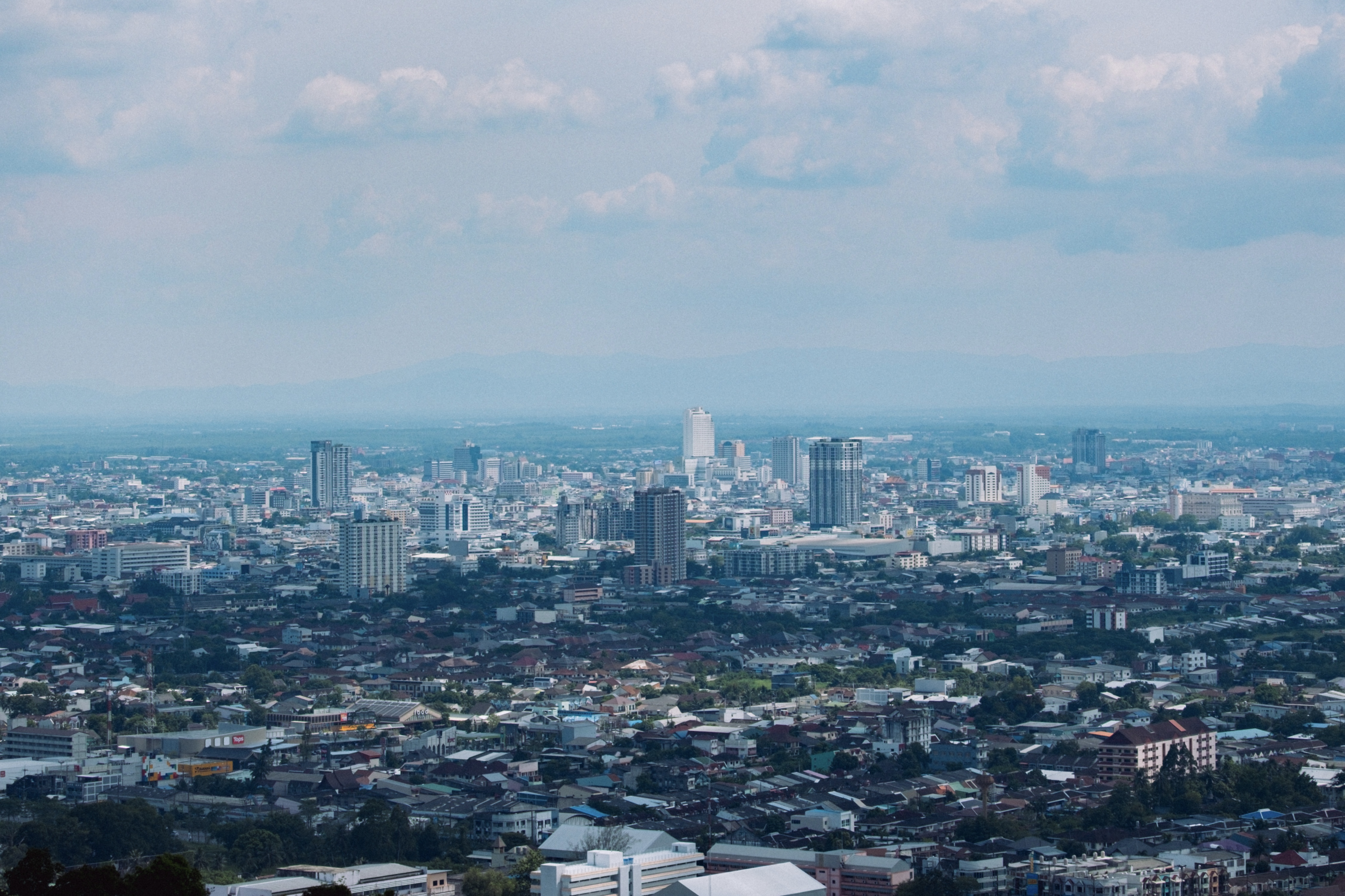
- Aerial view of Hat Yai

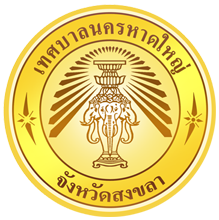
- Seal
- Nickname: Big Mahat
- Location Hat Yai in Thailand
- Coordinates: 7°1′N 100°28′E
- Country: Thailand
- Province: Songkhla
- District: Hat Yai
- Subdistrict municipality: 10 December 1935
- Town municipality: 16 March 1949
- City municipality: 24 September 1995

Government
  - Type: City Municipality
  - Mayor: Sakhorn Thongmunee

Area
  - Municipality: 21.00 km^{2} (8.11 sq mi)
  - Land: 20.50 km^{2} (7.92 sq mi)
  - Water: 0.50 km^{2} (0.19 sq mi) 2.38%
  - Urban: 852.796 km^{2} (329.266 sq mi)
  - Rank: 21st

Population (2024)
  - Municipality: 191,696
  - Rank: 4th in Thailand
  - Density: 9,128/km^{2} (23,640/sq mi)
  - Urban (2024): 406,513
  - Metro: 650,000
- Time zone: UTC+7 (ICT)
- Postcode: 90110
- Calling code: 074
- Airport: IATA: HDY; ICAO: VTSS
- Website: hatyaicity.go.th

Hat Yai (Thai: หาดใหญ่, pronounced [hàːt̚ jàj]) is a city in southern Thailand near the Malaysian border. As of 2024, the municipality is the fifth-largest city in Thailand, with a population of 191,696 and an urban population of 406,513 in the entire district of Amphoe Hat Yai.

Hat Yai is the largest city in Southern Thailand and is part of the Hat Yai-Songkhla Metropolitan Area (with a population of about 650,000) which include 2 big districts (Hat Yai, Mueang Songkhla) and 3 small neighboring districts (Bang Klam, Khlong Hoi Khong, Na Mom, forming the largest metropolitan area in the south, and the fourth-largest metropolitan area of the country. The city is often mistaken for being the provincial capital. In fact, Songkhla is the capital and the center of administration and culture while Hat Yai is the business center.

== History ==
Originally named Khok Samet Chun (โคกเสม็ดชุน, "shore eugenia knoll"), Hat Yai was a small village until the Southern Line was built there, making it a major rail hub at the time. The junction which connected the town of Songkhla with the main route was formerly in the U Tapao area, but was later moved to Khok Samet Chun in 1922 when the U Tapao area turned out to be flood-prone. At that time, Khok Samet Chun had only four residents, but thanks to the investments of Khun Niphat Chinnakorn (the railway contractor for the railway line from Nakhon Si Thammarat to Pattani), it quickly grew into a small town.

In 1928, Hat Yai was made a community (chumchon), which was upgraded to a sanitary district (sukhaphiban) on December 11, 1935. It covered an area of 4.4 km^{2} (1.7 sq mi), and was administered by the first mayor, Udom Bunlong. In 1938, the municipal administration building was completed. On March 16, 1949, Hat Yai was granted town status (thesaban mueang). On May 10, 1961, the area covered by the municipality was increased to 8 km^{2} (3.1 sq mi). As a result of the town's continuing growth, on August 13, 1968, a larger, new municipal administration building was opened. On April 24, 1977, the total area of the municipality was enlarged for the second time to 21 km^{2} (8.1 sq mi).

Finally, in 1995, the town was upgraded to city status (thesaban nakhon). There are a total of 102 communities (chumchon), divided into 4 zones.

The name "Hat Yai" is a short version of "mahat yai", meaning big mahat (Thai: มะหาด) tree, a relative of jackfruits in genus Artocarpus.

The 2014 Hat Yai Bombings happened on 6 May 2014, when three improvised explosive devices exploded roughly seven minutes apart in the heart of Hat Yai, Thailand in the afternoon, wounding at least eight people. Additional blasts struck the railway station, and a further bomb was found near the flats in Prince of Songkhla Hospital but the bomb squad was able to defuse it in time.

== Transportation ==
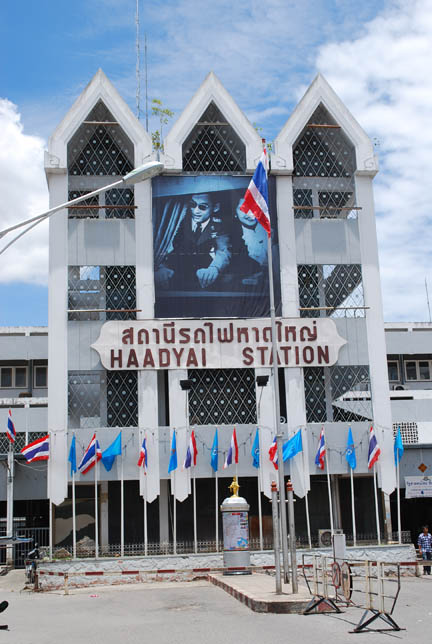
Hat Yai Junction, the largest station of southern Thailand

Hat Yai Junction has become the transportation hub of southern Thailand since the railway was constructed.

Parallel to the railway line is the Asian Highway 2. Asian Highway 18 runs from Hat Yai to Johor Bahru, Malaysia.

Hat Yai Bus Terminal is a major transport hub in southern Thailand. It offers bus services that link Hat Yai with nearly every town and city in the southern region as well as other destinations, including Bangkok and Nakhon Ratchasima. Hat Yai also has a minibus terminal which hosts the largest minibus service in southern Thailand. There are also several private minibus services which focus on tourist destinations, including Phuket, Ko Samui, Ko Pha Ngan, Pak Bara Pier in La-ngu district, Satun (a gateway to the islands in the southern Andaman Sea), Langkawi, Penang, Kuala Lumpur, and Singapore. The minibus service has gained popularity in recent years as minibuses are considered a faster way to travel.

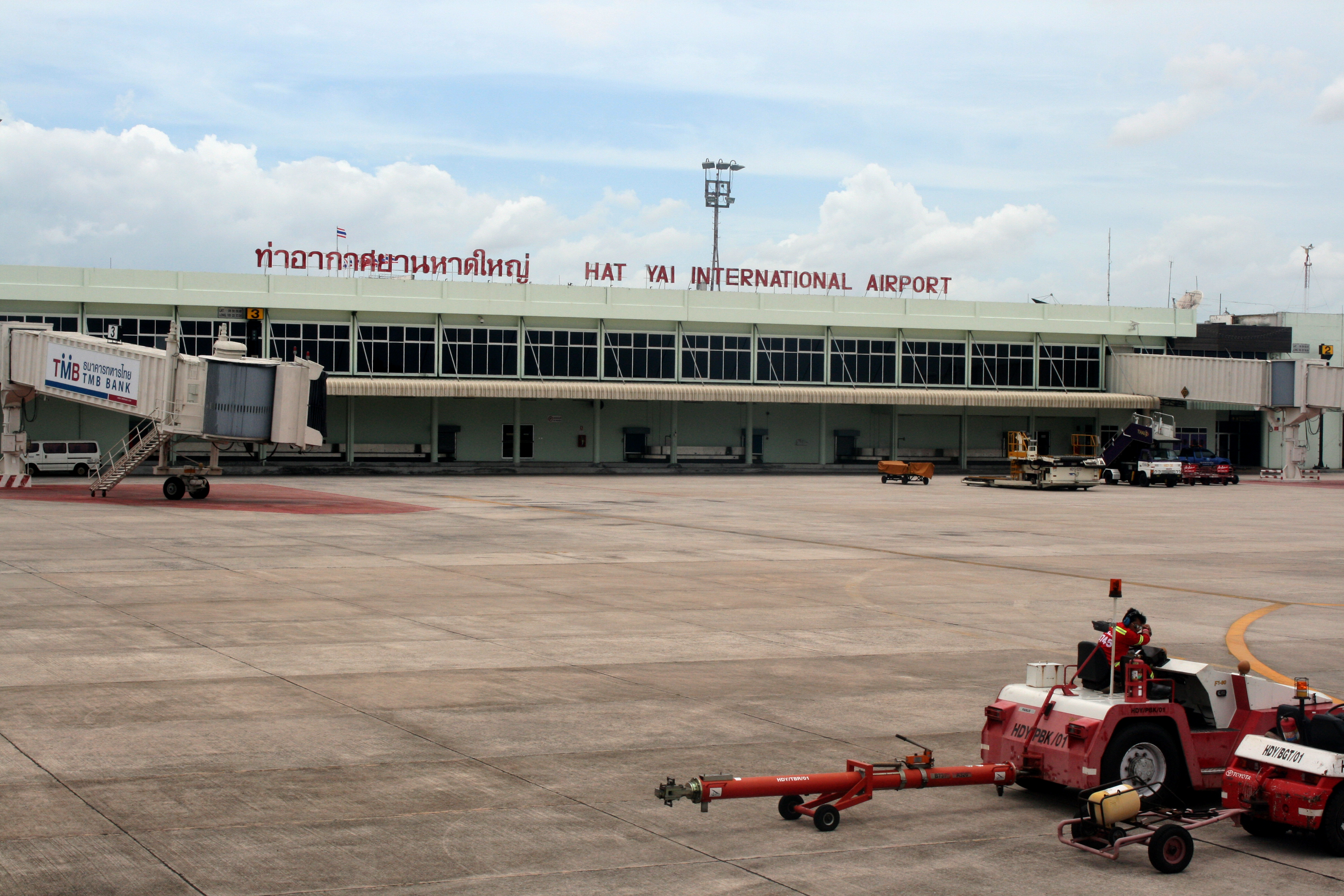
Hat Yai International Airport, fifth busiest airport of Thailand

Hat Yai International Airport which was upgraded to an international airport in December 1972, is located 9 km from downtown. It serves various destinations across Thailand and provides international connections to Kuala Lumpur and Singapore. The airport is listed as Thailand's fifth busiest airport, serving 4,256,107 passengers in 2018.

== Health ==
There are two main hospitals in Hat Yai. Hatyai Hospital is operated by the Ministry of Public Health, while Songklanagarind Hospital is a university hospital operated by the Faculty of Medicine, Prince of Songkla University.

== Demographics ==
Demographically, Hat Yai is notable for a higher proportion of Thai Chinese and Thai Malay citizens than other cities of comparable size in Thailand. Unlike most of Songkhla province, the main language spoken in Hat Yai is Central Thai. Southern Thai varieties such as Songkhla and Sadao dialects are also common as well, and varieties of Songkhla Malay which is spoken by ethnic Malay people. The population of Hat Yai Municipality was 156,802 as of 2019, making it the fourth largest city municipality (city proper) in the country after Bangkok, Nonthaburi, and Pak Kret, and the fifth-largest city (Urban; with a population of 400,000) in the country after Bangkok, Chiang Mai, Korat and Khon Kaen.

== Education ==
Prince of Songkla University is the oldest and largest university in southern Thailand. The main campus is near Hat Yai downtown; the campus area covers Hat Yai city and Kho Hong town. This public university is ranked one of the top national universities. The first private university in southern Thailand, Hatyai University, is also located in the urban area of Hat Yai. In addition, Ramkhamhaeng University's campus is near the international airport.

Hat Yai is also home to several famous high schools, including the country's top ten, Hatyaiwittayalai School (public). Another well-known public school is Hatyaiwittayalaisomboonkulkanya School, the former branch of Hatyaiwittayalai. In addition, there are several popular private schools in greater Hat Yai, including Saengthong Vitthaya School, Thidanukhro School, and PSU Wittayanusorn School.

== Climate ==
Hat Yai has a tropical monsoon climate (Am), which is hot and humid, like other parts of Southern Thailand. Hat Yai has only two seasons; wet and dry. The wet season, which is influenced by monsoon and rain storms, is from April to December, while the sunny dry season is only from January to March. Additionally, there have been occasional floods in Hat Yai, due to the heavy rain; it can rain for twenty-two days in November with more than 317 mm (12.5 in) of precipitation.

Climate data for Hat Yai International Airport (1991–2020, extremes 1973-present)
Month	Jan	Feb	Mar	Apr	May	Jun	Jul	Aug	Sep	Oct	Nov	Dec	Year
Record high °C (°F)	35.4 (95.7)	37.4 (99.3)	38.9 (102.0)	39.7 (103.5)	38.5 (101.3)	36.8 (98.2)	38.1 (100.6)	37.3 (99.1)	36.5 (97.7)	36.3 (97.3)	34.7 (94.5)	34.3 (93.7)	39.7 (103.5)
Mean daily maximum °C (°F)	31.2 (88.2)	32.7 (90.9)	34.2 (93.6)	34.7 (94.5)	34.1 (93.4)	33.5 (92.3)	33.3 (91.9)	33.2 (91.8)	32.7 (90.9)	32.0 (89.6)	30.7 (87.3)	30.1 (86.2)	32.7 (90.9)
Daily mean °C (°F)	26.2 (79.2)	26.8 (80.2)	27.6 (81.7)	28.1 (82.6)	28.0 (82.4)	27.7 (81.9)	27.5 (81.5)	27.4 (81.3)	27.0 (80.6)	26.6 (79.9)	26.3 (79.3)	25.9 (78.6)	27.1 (80.8)
Mean daily minimum °C (°F)	22.3 (72.1)	22.0 (71.6)	22.7 (72.9)	23.7 (74.7)	24.1 (75.4)	23.9 (75.0)	23.6 (74.5)	23.5 (74.3)	23.5 (74.3)	23.4 (74.1)	23.4 (74.1)	22.9 (73.2)	23.3 (73.9)
Record low °C (°F)	17.6 (63.7)	18.2 (64.8)	18.5 (65.3)	20.0 (68.0)	21.2 (70.2)	20.9 (69.6)	20.3 (68.5)	20.6 (69.1)	20.9 (69.6)	21.1 (70.0)	20.7 (69.3)	19.1 (66.4)	17.6 (63.7)
Average precipitation mm (inches)	88.1 (3.47)	29.9 (1.18)	77.4 (3.05)	116.4 (4.58)	128.5 (5.06)	121.0 (4.76)	100.5 (3.96)	123.8 (4.87)	146.8 (5.78)	224.3 (8.83)	324.3 (12.77)	275.0 (10.83)	1,756 (69.1)
Average precipitation days (≥ 1.0 mm)	6.2	2.8	5.0	8.7	11.1	9.8	10.4	10.9	12.7	16.8	18.3	15.2	127.9
Average relative humidity (%)	80.1	76.7	76.4	78.2	80.3	80.2	79.7	79.6	82.0	84.8	86.8	85.2	80.8
Average dew point °C (°F)	22.2 (72.0)	22.0 (71.6)	22.6 (72.7)	23.5 (74.3)	23.9 (75.0)	23.7 (74.7)	23.3 (73.9)	23.2 (73.8)	23.4 (74.1)	23.6 (74.5)	23.7 (74.7)	23.1 (73.6)	23.2 (73.8)
Mean monthly sunshine hours	182.9	166.7	186.0	144.0	114.7	111.0	114.7	114.7	108.0	111.6	105.0	108.5	1,567.8
Mean daily sunshine hours	5.9	5.9	6.0	4.8	3.7	3.7	3.7	3.7	3.6	3.6	3.5	3.5	4.3
Source 1: World Meteorological Organization, Meteomanz (record)
Source 2: Office of Water Management and Hydrology, Royal Irrigation Department (sun 1981–2010)(extremes)

== Commerce ==
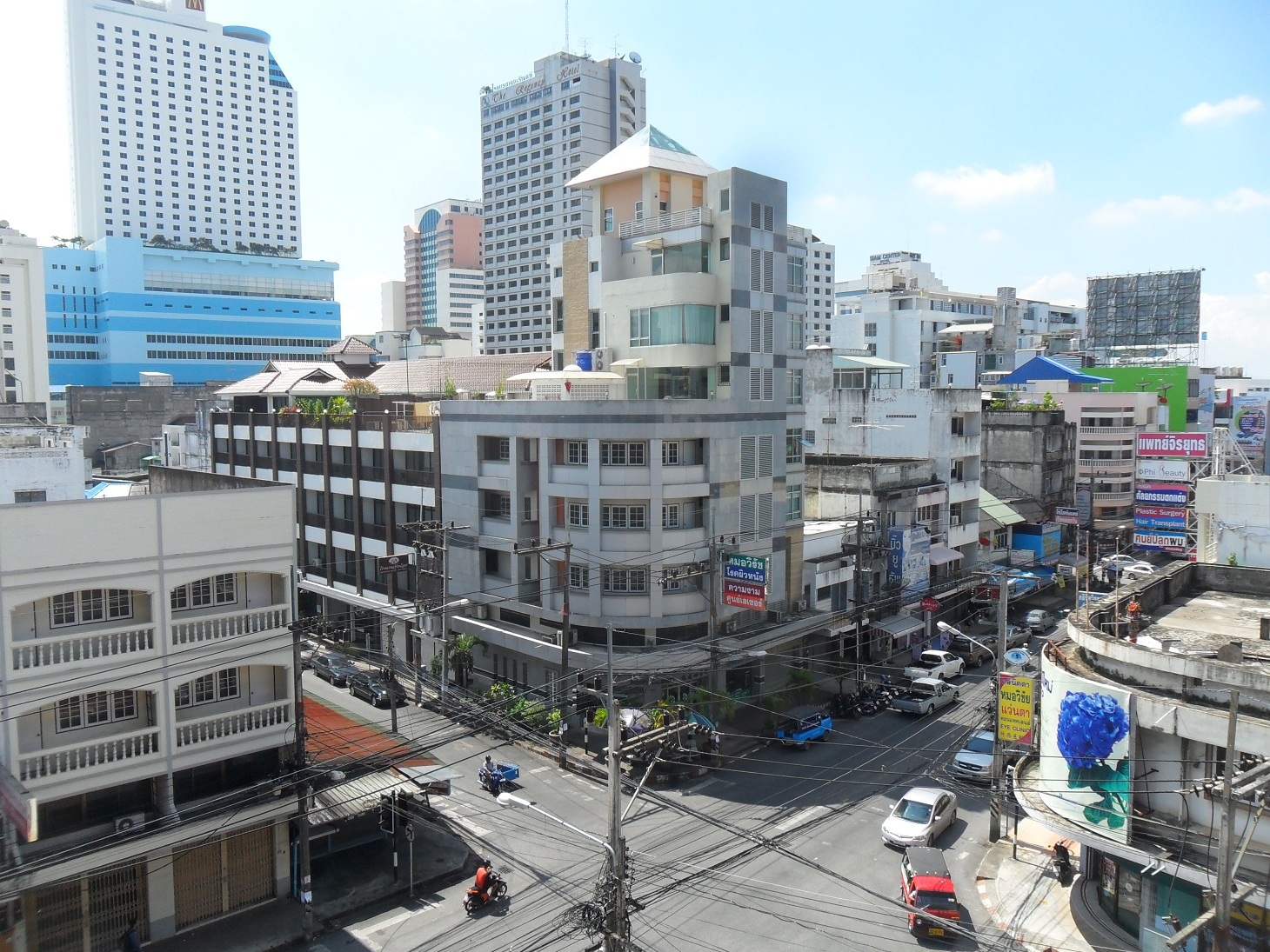
The central area of Hat Yai city

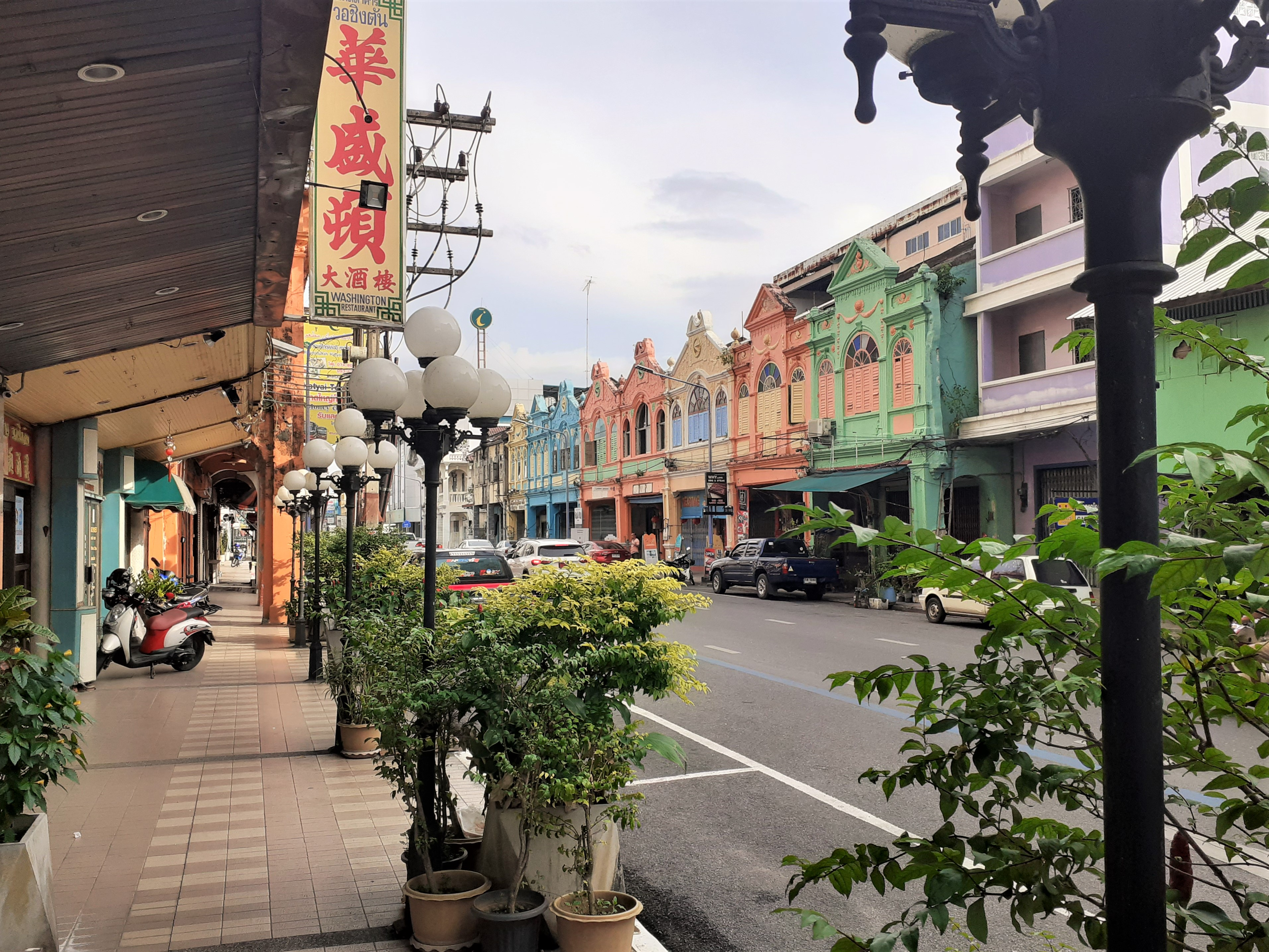
Historic shophouses in Hat Yai

Hat Yai has a reputation for being a shopping destination for both Thai people and foreigners. There are a number of department stores, shopping malls and markets throughout the city. Suntisook Market on Nipat U-tid 1, 2 & 3 roads are among the best-known. Their main products are imported processed food, cosmetics, fabrics, gadgets and electrical appliances. The city's major wet market is located near the railway station.

Kim Yong market (also Gim Yong) is a famous market located in the center of Hat Yai, Songkhla. The market is divided into 2 parts. The first part is a 2-floor building previously called the “Chaloemthai” cinema. The second part is an outdoor market, alongside the road.

The goods in this market are varied and each part of the market is different. On the first floor of the building, there are fresh foods, such as vegetables, meats, seafood, groceries, clothes, snacks, and dry foodstuffs. It is well known that Kim Yong Market has many kinds of dry foodstuffs from China and snacks like chocolates and chips from Malaysia. On the second floor, there are electric appliances which are made in Thailand and China. All of these imported goods are inexpensive because they are tax-free. Outside of the building, many shops and stalls can be found along small streets. Most of the shops sell batiks from Malaysia and Indonesia and Muslim clothes while the majority of stalls sell foods and fruits. Moreover, chestnut is another popular product, which visitors prefer to buy.

Because of the variety of goods in this market, it is able to attract a large number of people, not only local people but also foreigners and travelers.

The city has two large weekend markets, namely Asian Trade and Greenway, which are both located on Kanchanavanit Road. They mainly sell second-hand products, including clothes, shoes, decor and souvenirs.

== Culture ==
An important Buddhist temple is Hat Yai Nai Temple or Wat Hat Yai Nai. It is home to the third largest reclining statue on the planet, the Phra Phutthamongkol Maharat.

Held on the first night of October, Chak Phra is a Buddhist festival specific to the south of Thailand. It is celebrated with Buddha boat processions or sports events like a run up Khao Tang Kuan hill. In September or October at the Chinese Lunar festival, the Thai and Chinese present their offerings to the moon, "queen of the heavens", in gratitude for past and future fortunes.

Hat Yai is also well known for its spectacular celebrations of the Chinese New Year festival. Although Thai elements have been incorporated (for example, Thai pop stars have been invited to perform), the celebration remains distinctly Chinese. “Despite being several generations removed from Hat Yai's original Chinese pioneers, the New Year celebration provides strong evidence that the community is still influenced by and strongly identifies with its Chinese roots.

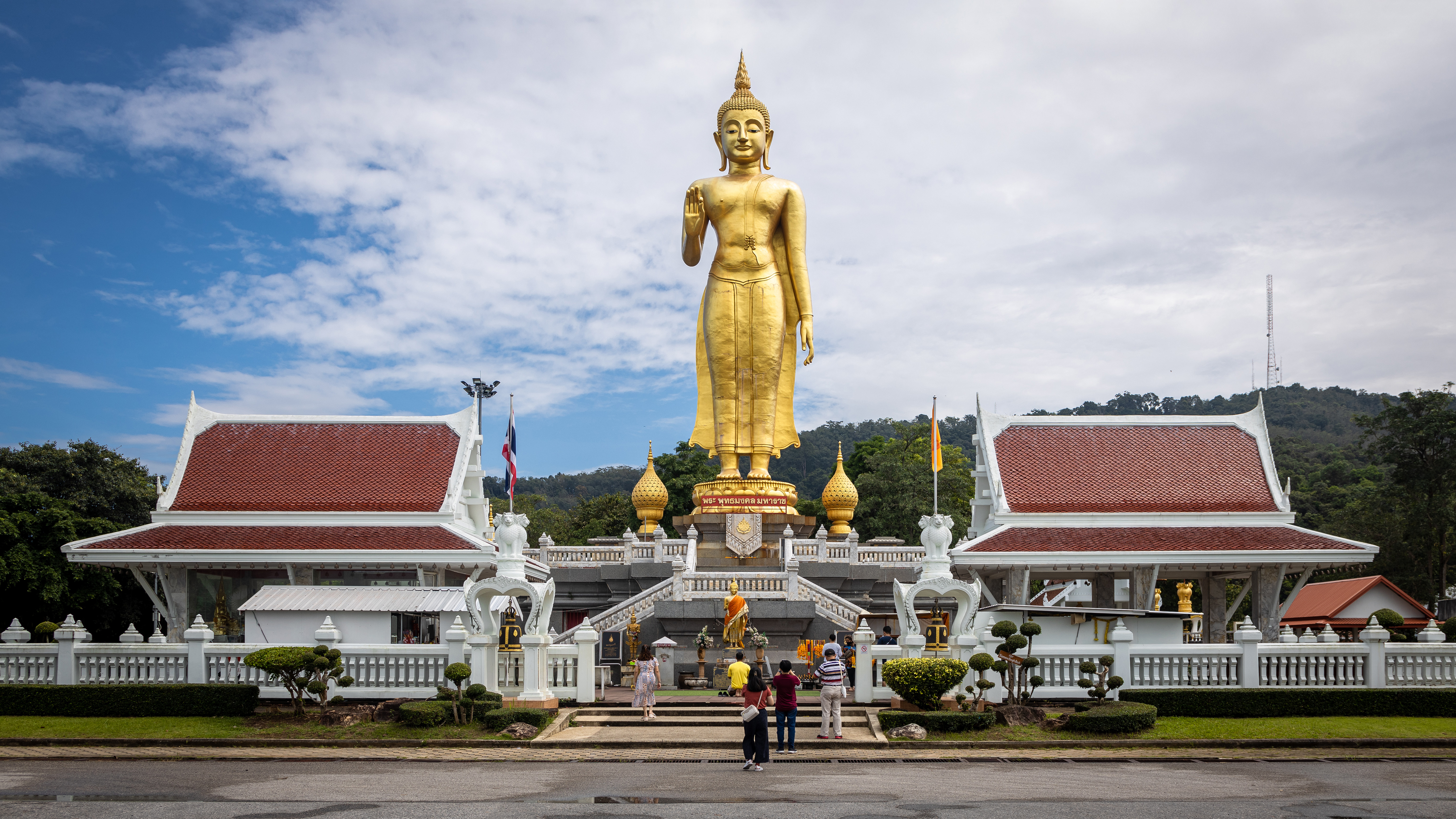
Phra Phutthamongkol Maharat

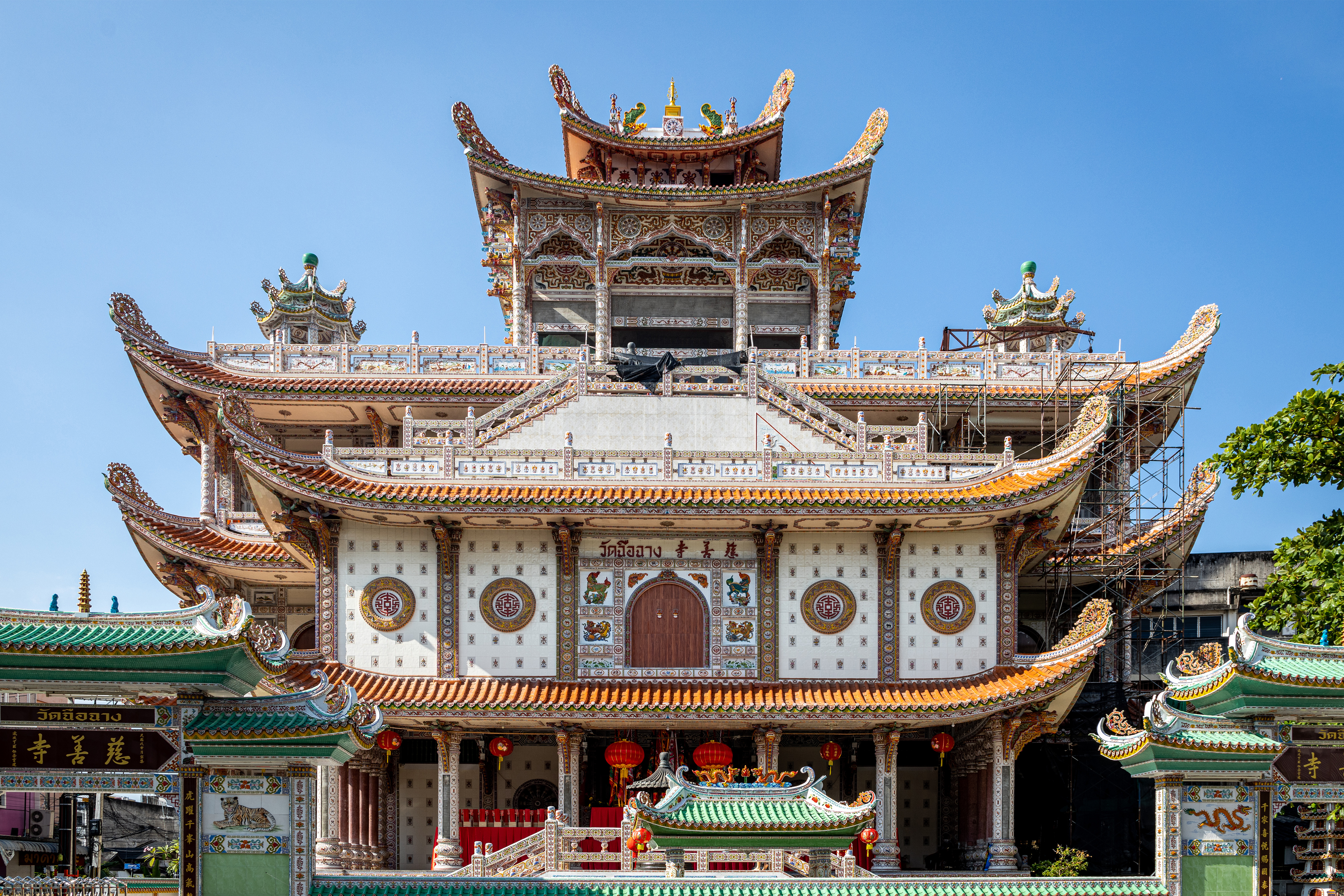
Wat Chue Chang
