= Faculty of Medicine, Prince of Songkla University =

Medical school in Thailand

- คณะแพทยศาสตร์ มหาวิทยาลัยสงขลานครินทร์
- Type: Public (non-profit)
- Established: 6 October 1972
- Parent institution: Prince of Songkla University
- Dean: Assoc. Prof. Ruangsak Leethanaporn, M.D.
- Location: 15 Karnjanavanich Road, Hat Yai, Songkhla 90112, Thailand; 7.007077°N 100.496616°E
- Colors: Green
- Website: medinfo.psu.ac.th

The Faculty of Medicine, Prince of Songkla University (Thai: คณะแพทยศาสตร์ มหาวิทยาลัยสงขลานครินทร์) is the medical faculty of Prince of Songkla University. It is the sixth oldest medical school in Thailand located in Hat Yai District, Songkhla Province and is the fourth oldest faculty of Prince of Songkla University, opening in 1972 by royal decree.

== History ==
Due to a lack of medical and healthcare personnel in Thailand, as well as various healthcare issues in Southern Thailand, the council of Prince of Songkla University requested for the construction of a Faculty of Medicine on 11 September 1968. The project was approved on 17 August 1971 and construction began at the Hat Yai campus of the university. The first cohort of medical students was accepted in June 1973, consisting of 35 students. Teaching was done in the Faculty of Science for the preclinical years and Hatyai Hospital and Songkhla Hospital during the clinical years.

On 26 August 1976, King Bhumibol Adulyadej and Queen Sirikit laid the foundation for the construction of the faculty's main teaching hospital. Ten years later on 18 September 1986, the King and Princess Sirindhorn opened the hospital and named it 'Songklanagarind' Hospital. Songklanagarind Hospital has become the main teaching hospital since then.

== Departments ==
- Department of Anesthesiology
- Department of Biomedical Science
- Department of Community Medicine
- Department of Emergency Medicine
- Department of Internal Medicine
- Department of Obstetrics and Gynecology
- Department of Ophthalmology
- Department of Orthopaedic Surgery and Physical Medicine
- Department of Otolaryngology
- Department of Pathology
- Department of Pediatrics
- Department of Physical Therapy
- Department of Psychiatry
- Department of Radiology
- Department of Surgery
- Department of Epidemiology

== Education ==
The following table displays the programs taught at the Faculty of Medicine at Prince of Songkla University.

Undergraduate programs
- Doctor of Medicine (MD)
- BSc. Medical Science
- BSc. Biomedical Science
- BSc. Physical Therapy
- BSc. Radiological Technology
Graduate programs
- MSc. Epidemiology
- MSc. Biomedical Science
- MSc. Biomedical Engineering
- MSc. Occupational Medicine
- Higher Graduate Diploma Certificate in Clinical Medical Science
Doctorate programs
- Ph.D. Epidemiology
- Ph.D. Biomedical Science
- Ph.D. Biomedical Engineering

== Main Teaching Hospitals ==
- Songklanagarind Hospital
- Hatyai Hospital (CPIRD), Songkhla Province
- Yala Hospital (CPIRD), Yala Province

== Affiliated Teaching Hospitals ==
- Trang Hospital, Trang province
- Songkhla Hospital, Songkhla province
- Maharaj Nakhon Si Thammarat Hospital, Nakhon Si Thammarat province
- Surat Thani Hospital, Surat Thani province
- Thung Song Hospital, Nakhon Si Thammarat province
- Phatthalung Hospital, Phatthalung province

== See also ==
- List of medical schools in Thailand
