= Rattaphum district =

Rattaphum รัตภูมิ
- District
- District location in Songkhla province
- Coordinates: 7°8′6″N 100°16′24″E
- Country: Thailand
- Province: Songkhla
- Seat: Kamphaeng Phet
- Subdistricts: 5
- Mubans: 63

Area
  - Total: 591.8 km^{2} (228.5 sq mi)

Population (2014)
  - Total: 73,744
  - Density: 114.8/km^{2} (297/sq mi)
- Time zone: UTC+7 (ICT)
- Postal code: 90180
- Geocode: 9009

Rattaphum (Thai: รัตภูมิ, pronounced [rát.tā.pʰūːm]) is a district (amphoe) of Songkhla province, southern Thailand.

== Geography ==
Neighboring districts are (from the east clockwise): Khuan Niang, Bang Klam, and Hat Yai of Songkhla Province; Khuan Kalong of Satun province; and Pa Bon of Phatthalung province.

== History ==
The district was renamed from Kamphaeng Phet to Rattaphum in 1939.

== Administration ==
=== Central administration ===
Rattaphum is divided into five sub-districts (tambons), which are further subdivided into 63 administrative villages (mubans).

No.	Name	Thai	Villages	Pop.
1.	Kamphaeng Phet	กำแพงเพชร	13	21,302
2.	Tha Chamuang	ท่าชะมวง	15	17,674
3.	Khuha Tai	คูหาใต้	14	11,923
4.	Khuan Ru	ควนรู	9	6,041
9.	Khao Phra	เขาพระ	12	16,804

Missing numbers are tambon which now form Khuan Niang District.

=== Local administration ===
There is one town (Thesaban Mueang) in the district:

- Kamphaeng Phet (Thai: เทศบาลเมืองกำแพงเพชร) consisting of parts of sub-district Kamphaeng Phet.

There are three sub-district municipalities (thesaban tambon) in the district:

- Kamphaeng Phet (Thai: เทศบาลตำบลกำแพงเพชร) consisting of parts of sub-district Kamphaeng Phet.
- Na Si Thong (Thai: เทศบาลตำบลนาสีทอง) consisting of parts of sub-district Khao Phra.
- Khuha Tai (Thai: เทศบาลตำบลคูหาใต้) consisting of sub-district Khuha Tai.

There are three sub-district administrative organizations (SAO) in the district:

- Tha Chamuang (Thai: องค์การบริหารส่วนตำบลท่าชะมวง) consisting of sub-district Tha Chamuang.
- Khuan Ru (Thai: องค์การบริหารส่วนตำบลควนรู) consisting of sub-district Khuan Ru.
- Khao Phra (Thai: องค์การบริหารส่วนตำบลเขาพระ) consisting of parts of sub-district Khao Phra.
