= Songkhla Hospital =

Songkhla Hospital โรงพยาบาลสงขลา
- The Ministry of Public Health Health District 12

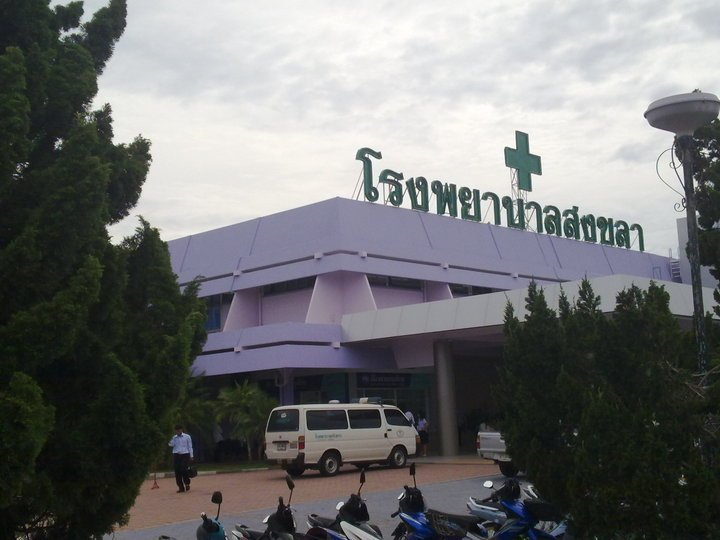

Geography
- Location: 666 Mu 2, Songkhla-Ranot Road, Phawong Subdistrict, Mueang Songkhla District, Songkhla 90100, Thailand
- Coordinates: 7.142183°N 100.566410°E

Organisation
- Type: General
- Affiliated university: Faculty of Medicine, Princess of Naradhiwas University; Faculty of Medicine, Prince of Songkla University

Services
- Beds: 508

History
- Former names: Songkhlaphayaban; Songkhla City Municipal Hospital
- Founded: 26 June 1925 (original location); 31 December 1995 (new location)

Links
- Website: www.skhospital.go.th
- Lists: Hospitals in Thailand

Songkhla Hospital (Thai: โรงพยาบาลสงขลา) is one of the two main hospitals of Songkhla Province, Thailand, operated by the Ministry of Public Health the other being the larger Hatyai Hospital. It is classified under the Ministry of Public Health as a general hospital. It has a CPIRD Medical Education Center which trains doctors for the Faculty of Medicine of Princess of Naradhiwas University. It is an affiliated teaching hospital of the Faculty of Medicine, Prince of Songkla University.

== History ==
In 1921-1924 Prince Yugala Dighambara, then viceroy of the south, initiated the funding and planning of a hospital in central Songkhla City and on 26 June 1925, the Songkhlaphayaban was opened by Prince Mahidol Adulyadej. In 1935, operations were transferred so Songkhla City Municipality and thus the hospital was renamed Songkhla City Municipal Hospital. In 1952, operations were then transferred again to the Ministry of Public Health and the hospital was extensively expanded. However due to limited space in city centre, the hospital board sought out a new location for the hospital. In 1985, under Prem's cabinet as part of the Sixth National Social and Economic Development Plan, an agreement was made with the Royal Thai Army Fourth Army Area and Songkhla Provincial Administration to transfer a piece of land at the southern end of the Tinsulanonda Bridge for the construction of the new hospital. Construction was started in April 1995 and completed in December of the same year, the new hospital opening on 31 December as Songkhla Hospital. The old hospital in the city centre was then converted into the "Songkhla City Urban Community Health Centre".

== See also ==
- Healthcare in Thailand
- Hospitals in Thailand
- List of hospitals in Thailand
- Hatyai Hospital
- Rohingya genocide Thai Southern student’s sympathy to accept more Myanmar refugees
- Migrant education free education for minority like Myanmar Lao and all Thai students
- Education for Liberation of Siam
