= Hatyai Hospital =

Hospital in Hat Yai, Songkhla, Thailand

Hatyai Hospital โรงพยาบาลหาดใหญ่
- Ministry of Public Health Health District 12

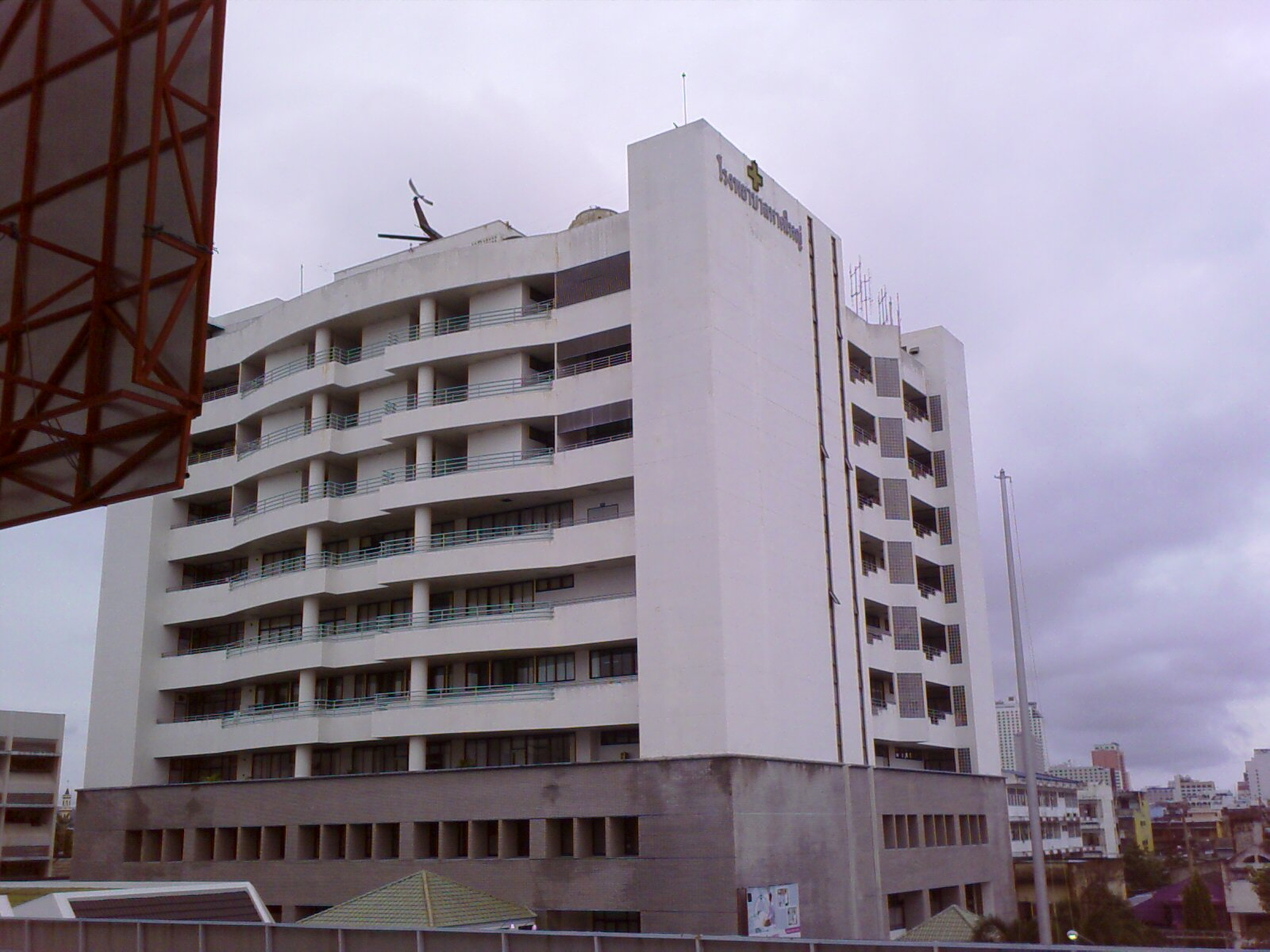
- The Accident and Emergency Building

Geography
- Location: 182 Ratthakan Road, Hat Yai District, Songkhla, Thailand
- Coordinates: 7°01′00″N 100°28′05″E

Organisation
- Type: Regional
- Affiliated university: Faculty of Medicine, Prince of Songkla University

Services
- Standards: Hospital Accreditation (Institute of Hospital Quality Improvement & Accreditation, Thailand)
- Emergency department: Yes
- Beds: 655

History
- Founded: 1957; 69 years ago

Links
- Website: http://www.hatyaihospital.go.th/
- Lists: Hospitals in Thailand

Hatyai Hospital (Thai: โรงพยาบาลหาดใหญ่) is a hospital in Hat Yai, Songkhla Province, Thailand. It is classified as a regional hospital under the Ministry of Public Health, and it is one of two main hospitals operated by the MOPH in the province, the other being Songkhla Hospital. It serves as a referral centre for nearby community hospitals mainly within Songkhla, but also in parts of Pattani and Satun Provinces. It nominally has a capacity of 640 beds, but as is often the case with most regional hospitals, it faces problems of overcrowding and is overcapacity most of the time.

The hospital was founded in 1957 and has gradually expanded since then. Currently, it also serves as a teaching hospital for the Faculty of Medicine, Prince of Songkhla University under the Collaborative Project to Increase Production of Rural Doctors (CPIRD), and is certified for residency training in internal medicine, obstetrics & gynaecology, orthopaedics, paediatrics and surgery.

== See also ==
- Hospitals in Thailand
- List of hospitals in Thailand
