= Prince of Songkla University =

University in southern Thailand

- มหาวิทยาลัยสงขลานครินทร์ (ม.อ.)
- Motto: ประโยชน์ของเพื่อนมนุษย์เป็นกิจที่หนึ่ง (RTGS: Prayot Khong Phuean Manut Pen Kit Thi Nueng, transl. Humanity's Benefit is our Foremost Duty)
- Motto in English: "Our Soul is for the Benefit of Mankind"
- Type: Autonomous public university
- Established: October 22, 1967
- Affiliations: ASAIHL, AUN
- Endowment: THB 4,171,014,200 (2012)
- Chairman: Professor Sanit Aksornkoae
- President: Assistant Professor Niwat Keawpradub, Ph.D.
- Royal conferrer: Chulabhorn Walailak, Princess Srisavangavadhana on behalf of the King
- Students: 34,000 (2007)
- Undergraduates: 29,000 (2007)
- Postgraduates: 5,000 (2007)
- Location: Main campus: 15 Kanjanavanich Road, Hat Yai, Songkhla, Thailand; 7°00′39″N 100°29′49″E
- Symbolic tree: Jacaranda
- Colors: Navy blue
- Website: www.psu.ac.th

The Prince of Songkla University (PSU; Thai: มหาวิทยาลัยสงขลานครินทร์; RTGS: Mahawitthayalai Songkhla Nakharin) is a public university in southern Thailand. Established in 1967, it is the first university in southern Thailand. It was named by King Bhumibol Adulyadej in honor of Prince Mahidol Adulyadej, Prince of Songkla, the King's father.

The university consists of five campuses. In 1968, the first permanent campus was established in Pattani. The campus in Hat Yai was opened in 1971 and is now the main campus, with more than 50% of the university's students. Other campuses were established in Phuket (1977), Surat Thani (1990) and Trang (1991). As of 2007, the university offers 295 educational programs to its 34,000 students, including 18 international programs and three foreign language programs.

Prince of Songkla University hosts hundreds of international students. The Phuket campus accommodates the most students from European and North American universities. The International Study Program in Phuket (ISPP) is multidisciplinary, offering courses in social sciences, history, intercultural communications, tourism, human resources, and international finance and economics.

== History ==
In 1962 the Department of Provincial Administration was assigned by the Thai government, through the Southern Development Committee, to initiate a project to set up a university in southern Thailand in accordance with the Southern Development Plan. In 1965 the cabinet approved, in principle, that the main campus of the university was to be at Ruesamilae, an urban area of Pattani.

Since the Pattani site abuts the sea, very high humidity and sea water vapor would lead to prohibitive maintenance costs for the upkeep of the engineering laboratory equipment and engineering teaching facilities. It was agreed to relocate the Faculty of Engineering to a new site. After a long search, it was decided that the Faculty of Engineering should be located in Hat Yai District, Songkhla Province. Lady Atthakraweesunthorn agreed to donate a plot of land totaling 690 rai (approximately 276 acres) at Tambon Korhong, Hat Yai district, Songkla Province, which was to be used as a new campus of Prince of Songkla University where the Faculty of Engineering would be based.

In 1968 the National Assembly of Thailand passed the Prince of Songkla University Act, which became effective on 13 March of that year. Prince of Songkla University thus proclaimed 13 March as its “Foundation Day”. In 1969, the construction at Hat Yai campus was started. On 5 July 1971 when it was partially completed, about two hundred students and staff members of the Faculty of Engineering were moved to the new campus at Hat Yai.

In 2016, the university transitioned from a government agency to an autonomous university under state supervision.

== Rankings ==
University rankings

Global – Overall
- ARWU World: 801-900 (2019)
- QS World: 851-900 (2026)

Regional – Overall
- QS Asia: 206 (2025)

Prince of Songkla University is always ranked in the top 10 universities of Thailand. The university was 481st worldwide in 2006 and 525th in 2007 in THES - QS World University Rankings which was the 7th and 6th Thai universities on the list, respectively.

In the Webometrics Ranking of World Universities, the university performs as a successful cyber-university. In Thailand, it has topped the list of Thai universities for five non-consecutive times in 2008, 2009, and 2011. Prince of Songkla University is the first Thai university to make top 400 (January 2008), top 300 (January 2009) and top 200 (July 2009) of the world rankings. In July 2009, the university was ranked 175th in the world, 18th in Asia and 2nd in the Southeast Asia behind the National University of Singapore.

== National Research Universities ==
Prince of Songkla University a member of 9 universities of Thailand National Research Universities Project

=== Center of Excellence in Nanotechnology for Energy ===
Prince of Songkla University
- Established: April 2012
- Director: Assoc. Prof. Dr. Nantakan Muensit
- Adjunct faculty: Prof.Thorvald Andersson
- Address: Physics Building, Prince of Songkla University
- Location: Hat Yai, Songkhla, Thailand
- Website: CENE Official Site

The Center of Excellence in Nanotechnology for Energy (CENE) officially started in April 2012, when the former Excellence Center ended. The former Center (October 2006 – March 2012) comprised three groups of the faculties from Pharmacy, Science and Engineering which had been doing research in drug delivery, multilayers for MEMs and membranes for nanofiltration, and engineering nanomaterials, respectively. They have published more than 40 articles in various international journals plus 10 petty patents and patents. For the present, CENE consists of two groups of faculties from Science and Engineering who both focus on the theme of "Micro- and Nanoscale Energy". This involves energy conversion, energy storage and energy saving.

The objectives and ultimate goals of CENE are: 1) to develop the materials and systems for energy conversion without using external power supply and no combustible fuels. The production of electricity is aimed to feed ultra-low and low-power consumption electronics. 2) to develop the thermal energy storage derived from agricultural products and waste crops. They are aimed to be environmental friendly from the starting process until the end of usage and recycling process. 3) to develop the nanomaterials for color and multifunctional films coated on window glasses for long-life using in buildings and cars. By the objectives and goals described above, it is believed that CENE achievement would lead to "Clean Energy for Green City".

== Faculties ==
There are 5 campuses located within Southern Thailand as follows.

Hat Yai Campus

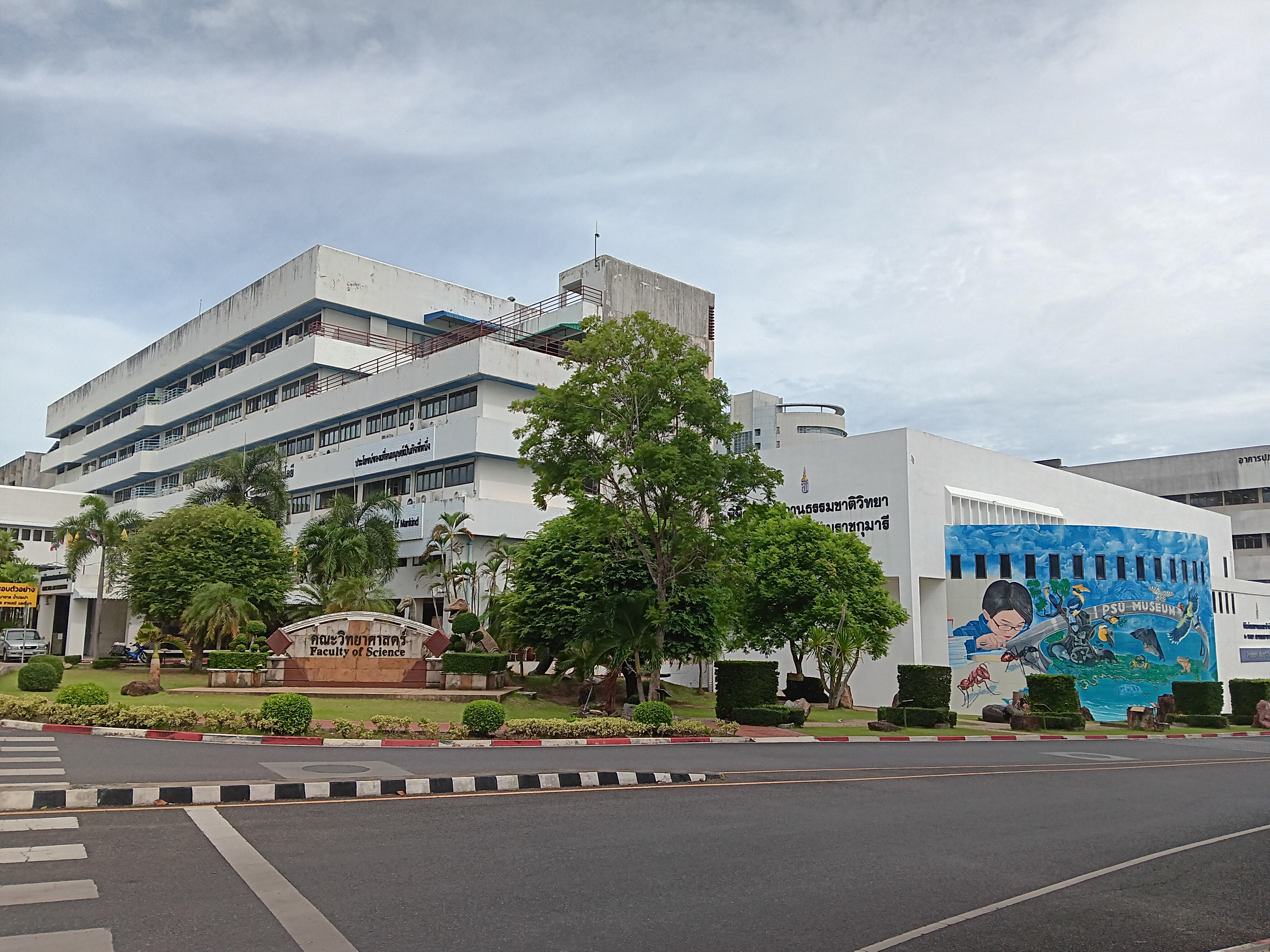
Part of Faculty of Science and Natural History Museum in Hat Yai Campus

- Faculty of Agro-Industry
- Faculty of Dentistry
- Faculty of Economics
- Faculty of Engineering
- Faculty of Environment Management
- Faculty of Law
- Faculty of Liberal Arts
- Faculty of Management Sciences
- Faculty of Medical Technology
- Faculty of Medicine
- Faculty of Natural Resources
- Faculty of Nursing
- Faculty of Pharmaceutical Sciences
- Faculty of Science
- Faculty of Traditional Thai Medicine
- Faculty of Veterinary Sciences
- Institute of Peace Studies
- International College
- Graduate School
- Marine and Coastal Resources Institute

Pattani Campus

- Faculty of Communication Sciences
- Faculty of Education
- Faculty of Fine and Applied Arts
- Faculty of Humanities and Social Sciences
- Faculty of Nursing
- Faculty of Political Sciences
- Faculty of Sciences and Technology
- College of Islamic Studies

Phuket Campus

- Faculty of Hospitality and Tourism
- Faculty of International Studies
- Faculty of Technology and Environment
- College of Computing
- Department of Computer Engineering
- Phuket Community College
- Interdisciplinary Graduate School of Earth System Science and Andaman Natural Disaster Management
- International College of Arts and Sciences, Phuket

Surat Thani Campus

- Faculty of Liberal Arts and Management Sciences
- Faculty of Sciences and Industrial Technology
- Faculty of Innovative Agriculture and Fisheries
- International College
- Graduate School

Trang Campus

- Faculty of Commerce and Management
- Faculty of Architecture
- College of Innovation for Performing Arts and Management
