= Songklanagarind Hospital =

Songklanagarind Hospital โรงพยาบาลสงขลานครินทร์

Geography
- Location: 15 Karnjanavanich Road, Hat Yai District, Songkhla 90112, Thailand
- Coordinates: 7.007171°N 100.494484°E

Organisation
- Type: Teaching
- Affiliated university: Faculty of Medicine, Prince of Songkla University

Services
- Beds: 1000

History
- Founded: 22 February 1982 (opened for patient admission) 18 September 1986 (official opening)

Links
- Website: hospital.psu.ac.th
- Lists: Hospitals in Thailand

Songklanagarind Hospital (Thai: โรงพยาบาลสงขลานครินทร์) is a university teaching hospital, affiliated to the Faculty of Medicine of Prince of Songkla University, located in Hat Yai District, Songkhla Province. It is a hospital capable of super tertiary care and is the first university hospital in Southern Thailand.

== History ==
On 26 August 1976, King Bhumibol Adulyadej and Queen Sirikit laid the foundation for the construction of the faculty's main teaching hospital, which was to be constructed for the following purposes:

- Use as a clinical training hospital for doctors, nurses and healthcare personnel
- Provide medical care, both prevention and cure to citizens in Southern Thailand
- Provide special equipment for patient diagnosis in the hospital and nearby hospitals
- Use as a research center to improve the healthcare in Southern Thailand

Ten years later on 18 September 1986, the King and Princess Sirindhorn opened the hospital and named it 'Songklanagarind' Hospital. Songklanagarind Hospital has become the main teaching hospital since then.

The current hospital director is Assoc. Prof. Rueangsak Leethanaporn, M.D.

As a university hospital, it is generally regarded as one of the final referral centers for complicated and rare diseases from all hospitals, especially within Southern Thailand.

== Facilities ==
The hospital has selected medical specialities in which the hospital has the professional staff capable of providing excellent service in that field. Six medical centers have been established so citizens in the South do not have to go to other institutions for receive the treatment. These are the following:

- Naradhiwas Rajanagarindra Heart Center
- Nanthana-Kriangkrai Chotiwattanaphan (NKC) Center of Gastroenterology and Hepatology
- Cancer Center
- Trauma Center
- Medical Information Center
- Palliative Care Unit

== See also ==
- Healthcare in Thailand
- Hospitals in Thailand
- List of hospitals in Thailand
