= Khao Nam Khang National Park =

National park in Thailand

Khao Nam Khang National Park อุทยานแห่งชาติเขาน้ำค้าง
- IUCN category II (national park)
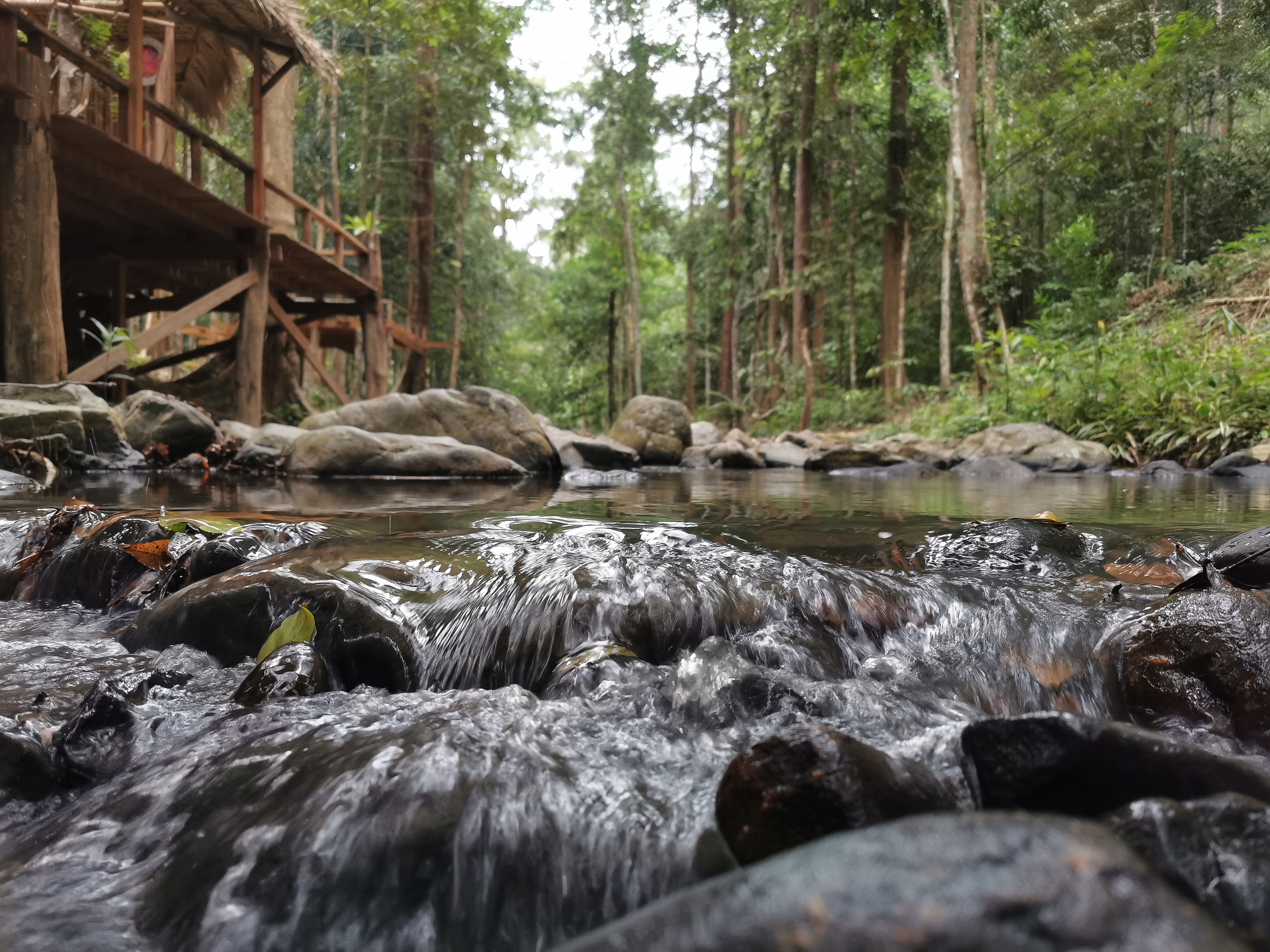
- Stream, Khao Nam Khang National Park
- Interactive map of Khao Nam Khang National Park อุทยานแห่งชาติเขาน้ำค้าง
- Location: Mu 1 Khlong Kwang, Na Thawi, Songkhla, Thailand
- Nearest city: Na Thawi
- Coordinates: 6°33′23″N 100°35′45″E
- Area: 212 km^{2} (82 sq mi)
- Established: July 22, 1990
- Visitors: 1,789 (in 2019)
- Governing body: Department of National Park, Wildlife and Plant Conservation (DNP)

Khao Nam Khang National Park (Thai: อุทยานแห่งชาติเขาน้ำค้าง) is a national park in Thailand. It was declared the 65th national park on July 22, 1990.

== Overview ==
The area is 132,500 rai or 212 square kilometres (82 sq mi). Its name "Khao Nam Khang" means "dew mountain". Khao Nam Kham stands 648 metres (2,126 ft) above mean sea level and is the origin of many streams that empty to local area. Most of the area is a tropical rainforest. The park's logo is a tapir.

=== Communist insurgency ===
As a mountain bordering Thailand and Malaysia, Khao Nam Khang was a base for the Malay Chinese Communist separatists during the early Cold War era. Today, the remnants of the base and the underground tunnels are maintained and converted into the "Khao Nam Khang Historical Tunnel" museum. Entry fees include 20 baht for adult, and 10 baht for child (Thai), 100 baht for adult, and 50 baht for child (foreigner).

== Flora and fauna ==
=== Flora ===
The flora of plants that can be found here are Hopea odorata, champak, Parashorea stellata, Homalium tomentosum, Cynometra iripa, Dipterocarpus turbinatus, Salacca wallichiana, including mosses, ferns, and various types of orchids, etc.

=== Fauna ===
Wildlife species include wild boar, sun bear, mainland serow, southern pig-tailed macaque, barking deer, gibbon, Malayan tapir, black leopard, mouse-deer, palm civet, tortoise, as well as various species of birds, such as hornbill, great argus, pheasant, green peacock, green-legged partridge, etc.

== Sights ==
There are many places of interest in the park

- Khao Nam Khang Historic Tunnel: highlight of the park, about 4 km (2.4 mi) from the park office
- Phru Ching Waterfall: the highest waterfall in the park away from the park office about 4 km.
- Ton Peak Mai Waterfall: waterfall in the deep forest, a trip to visit requires an officer to lead the way.
- Ton Tat Fah Waterfall
- Ton Lat Waterfall, location of the park headquarters.

== Location ==
Khao Nam Khang National Park in overview PARO 6 (Songkhla)

1) Khao Nam Khang National Park in overview PARO 6

	National park
1	Khao Nam Khang
2	Khao Pu-Khao Ya
3	San Kala Khiri
	Wildlife sanctuary
4	Khao Banthat
5	Ton Nga Chang

	Non-hunting area
6	Khao Pa Chang- Laem Kham
7	Khao Reng
8	Pa Krat
9	Phru Khang Khao
10	Thale Luang
11	Thale Noi
12	Thale Sap

	Forest park
13	Khuan Khao Wang
14	Mueang Kao Chai Buri

== See also ==
- List of national parks of Thailand
- DNP - Khao Nam Khang National Park
- List of Protected Areas Regional Offices of Thailand
