= Khuan Niang district =

Khuan Niang ควนเนียง
- District
- District location in Songkhla province
- Coordinates: 7°11′13″N 100°21′28″E
- Country: Thailand
- Province: Songkhla
- Seat: Rattaphum

Area
  - Total: 208.0 km^{2} (80.3 sq mi)

Population (2005)
  - Total: 33,264
  - Density: 159.9/km^{2} (414/sq mi)
- Time zone: UTC+7 (ICT)
- Postal code: 90220
- Geocode: 9013

Khuan Niang (Thai: ควนเนียง, pronounced [kʰūa̯n nīa̯ŋ]) is a district (amphoe) of Songkhla province, southern Thailand.

== History ==
The minor district (king amphoe) was established on 2 January 1985 by splitting off four tambons from Rattaphum district. It was upgraded to a full district on 21 May 1990.

== Geography ==
Neighboring districts are (from the east clockwise): Singhanakhon, Bang Klam, and Rattaphum of Songkhla Province and Pak Phayun of Phatthalung province.

== Administration ==
The district is divided into four sub-districts (tambons), which are further subdivided into 46 villages (mubans). Khuan Niang is a township (thesaban tambon) which covers parts of the tambon Rattaphum. There are a further four tambon administrative organizations (TAO).

No.	Name	Thai name	Villages	Pop.
1.	Rattaphum	รัตภูมิ	13	13,760
2.	Khuan So	ควนโส	11	5,647
3.	Huai Luek	ห้วยลึก	9	4,917
4.	Bang Riang	บางเหรียง	13	8,940
