= Hatyaiwittayalai School =

- โรงเรียนหาดใหญ่วิทยาลัย
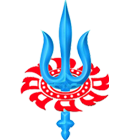

Location
- 468 Phet Kasem Rd. Hat Yai, Songkhla; Thailand
- Coordinates: 7.016458°N 100.475644°E

Information
- Type: Public Charter School
- Motto: Suvijāno bhavaṃ hoti (He who knows well will progress.)
- Established: 6 September 1945
- Founder: Ministry of Education
- Principal: Acting Sub Lt. Dr. Songkiat Puechmongkol
- Teaching staff: 198
- Grades: 7–12 (Mathayom 1–6)
- Gender: Coeducational
- Enrolment: 4,344 (2016 Academic Year)
- Classes: 99
- Average class size: 44
- Campus type: Urban
- Colour: Blue - Red

The Hatyaiwittayalai School is a high school in Hat Yai, Songkhla, Thailand.

== Curriculum ==
Offered programmes
	Programme
Grades 7–9 (Mathayom 1–3)	SMA - Science Math Ability
Grades 7–9 (Mathayom 1–3)	SMT - Science Math Technology
Grades 7–9 (Mathayom 1–3)	EP - English
Grades 7–9 (Mathayom 1–3)	EIS - English for Integrated Studies
Grades 7–9 (Mathayom 1–3)	Normal Program
Grades 10–12 (Mathayom 4–6)	DPST - Development and Promotion of Science and Technology Talents Project
Grades 10–12 (Mathayom 4–6)	ESC - Enrichment Science Classroom
Grades 10–12 (Mathayom 4–6)	SMA - Science Math Ability
Grades 10–12 (Mathayom 4–6)	SMT - Science Math Technology
Grades 10–12 (Mathayom 4–6)	Science – Mathematics
Grades 10–12 (Mathayom 4–6)	EP - English Program
Grades 10–12 (Mathayom 4–6)	Arts – Mathematics
Grades 10–12 (Mathayom 4–6)	Arts – French
Grades 10–12 (Mathayom 4–6)	Arts – Japanese
Grades 10–12 (Mathayom 4–6)	Arts – Chinese
Arts – Normal
