= Bang Klam district =

Bang Klam บางกล่ำ
- District
- District location in Songkhla province
- Coordinates: 7°5′21″N 100°24′39″E
- Country: Thailand
- Province: Songkhla
- Seat: Bang Klam
- Subdistricts: 4
- Mubans: 36
- District established: 1986

Area
  - Total: 147.8 km^{2} (57.1 sq mi)

Population (2014)
  - Total: 30,250
  - Density: 185.3/km^{2} (480/sq mi)
- Time zone: UTC+7 (ICT)
- Postal code: 90110
- Geocode: 9014

Bang Klam (Thai: บางกล่ำ, pronounced [bāːŋ klàm]) is a district (amphoe) of Songkhla province, southern Thailand.

== History ==
The minor district (king amphoe) was established on 7 January 1986 by splitting off four tambons from Hat Yai district. It was upgraded to a full district on 8 September 1995.

== Geography ==
Neighboring districts are (from the south clockwise): Hat Yai, Rattaphum, and Khuan Niang. To the northeast is the Songkhla lake.

== Administration ==
=== Central administration ===
Bang Klam is divided into four sub-districts (tambons), which are further subdivided into 36 administrative villages (mubans).

No.	Name	Thai	Villages	Pop.
1.	Bang Klam	บางกล่ำ	7	3,718
2.	Tha Chang	ท่าช้าง	18	20,578
3.	Mae Thom	แม่ทอม	6	2,277
4.	Ban Han	บ้านหาร	5	3,677

=== Local administration ===
There are two sub-district municipalities (thesaban tambons) in the district:

- Tha Chang (Thai: เทศบาลตำบลท่าช้าง) consisting of sub-district Tha Chang.
- Ban Han (Thai: เทศบาลตำบลบ้านหาร) consisting of sub-district Ban Han.

There are two subdistrict administrative organizations (SAO) in the district:

- Bang Klam (Thai: องค์การบริหารส่วนตำบลบางกล่ำ) consisting of sub-district Bang Klam.
- Mae Thom (Thai: องค์การบริหารส่วนตำบลแม่ทอม) consisting of sub-district Mae Thom.
