= Songkhla province =

Songkhla สงขลา
- Province

Other transcription(s)
  - Malay: Singgora (Rumi) سيڠݢورا (Jawi)
  - Southern Thai: สงขลา (pronounced [sôŋ.kʰlâː])
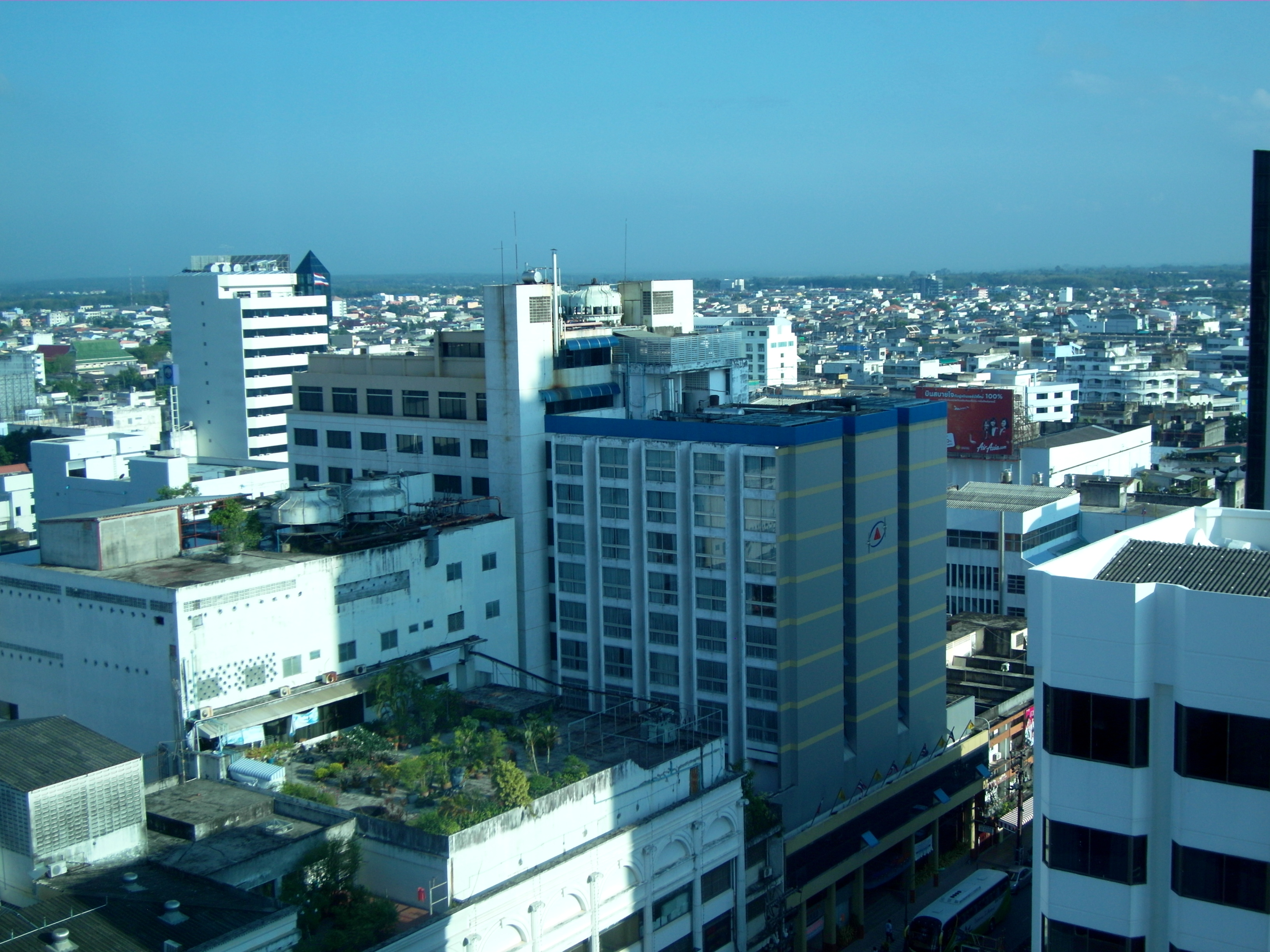
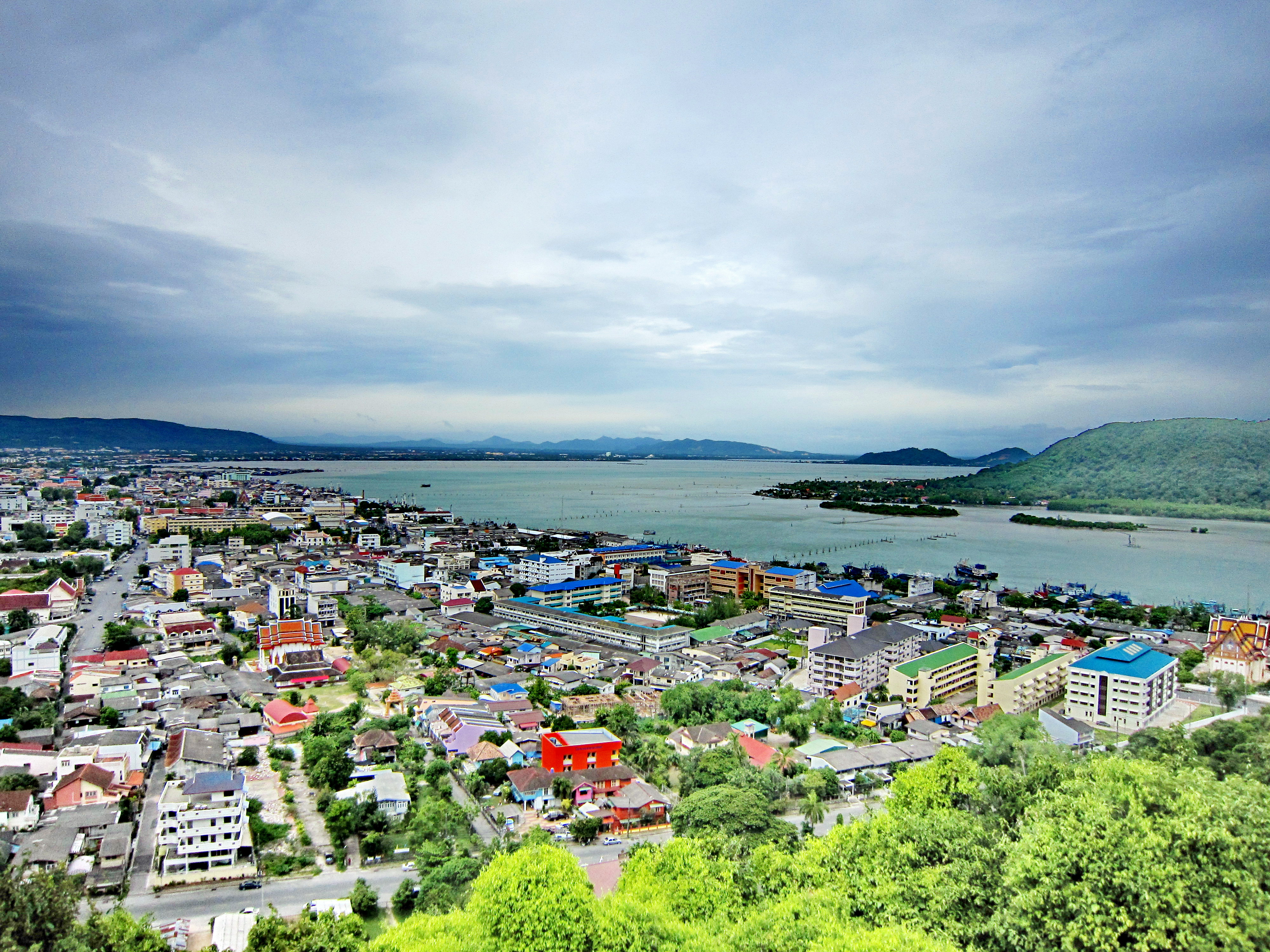
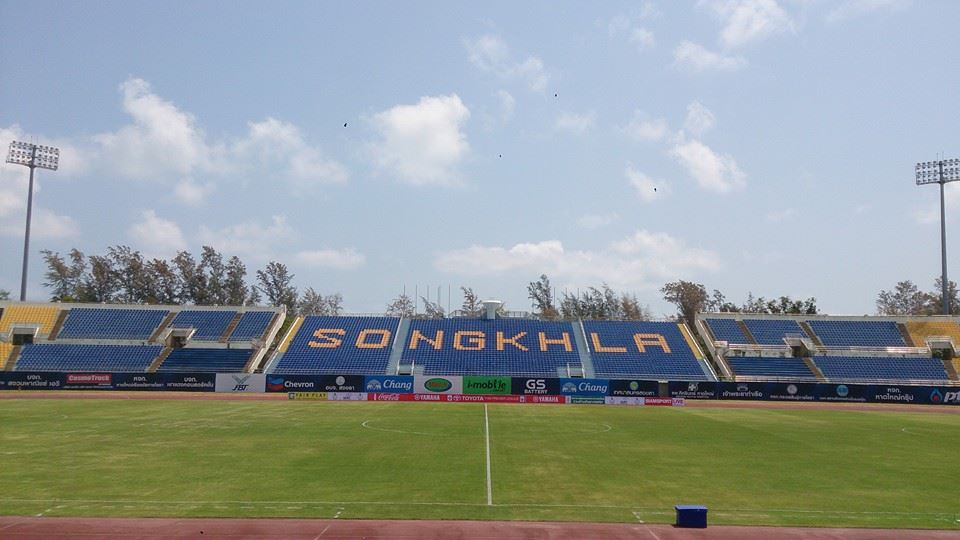
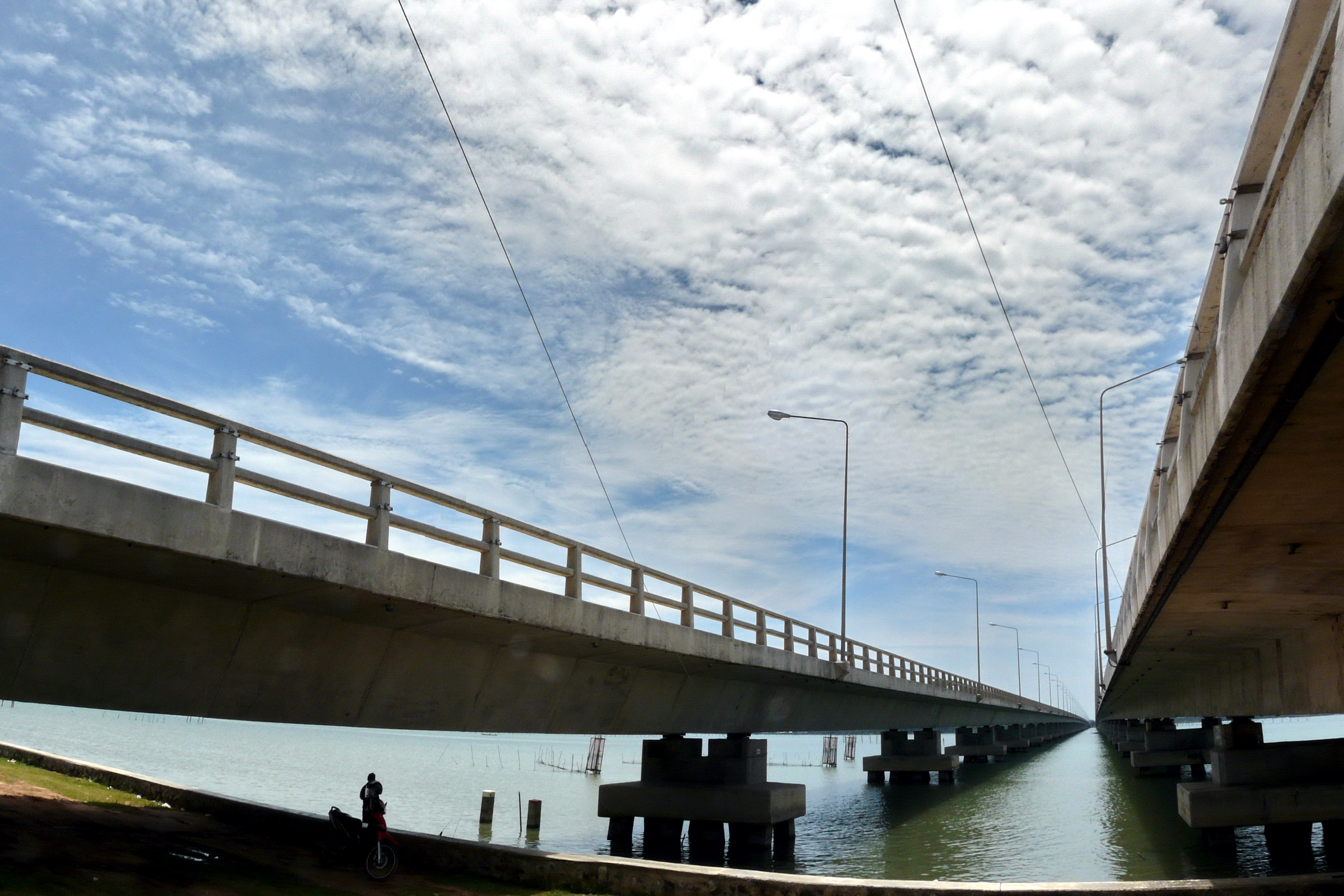
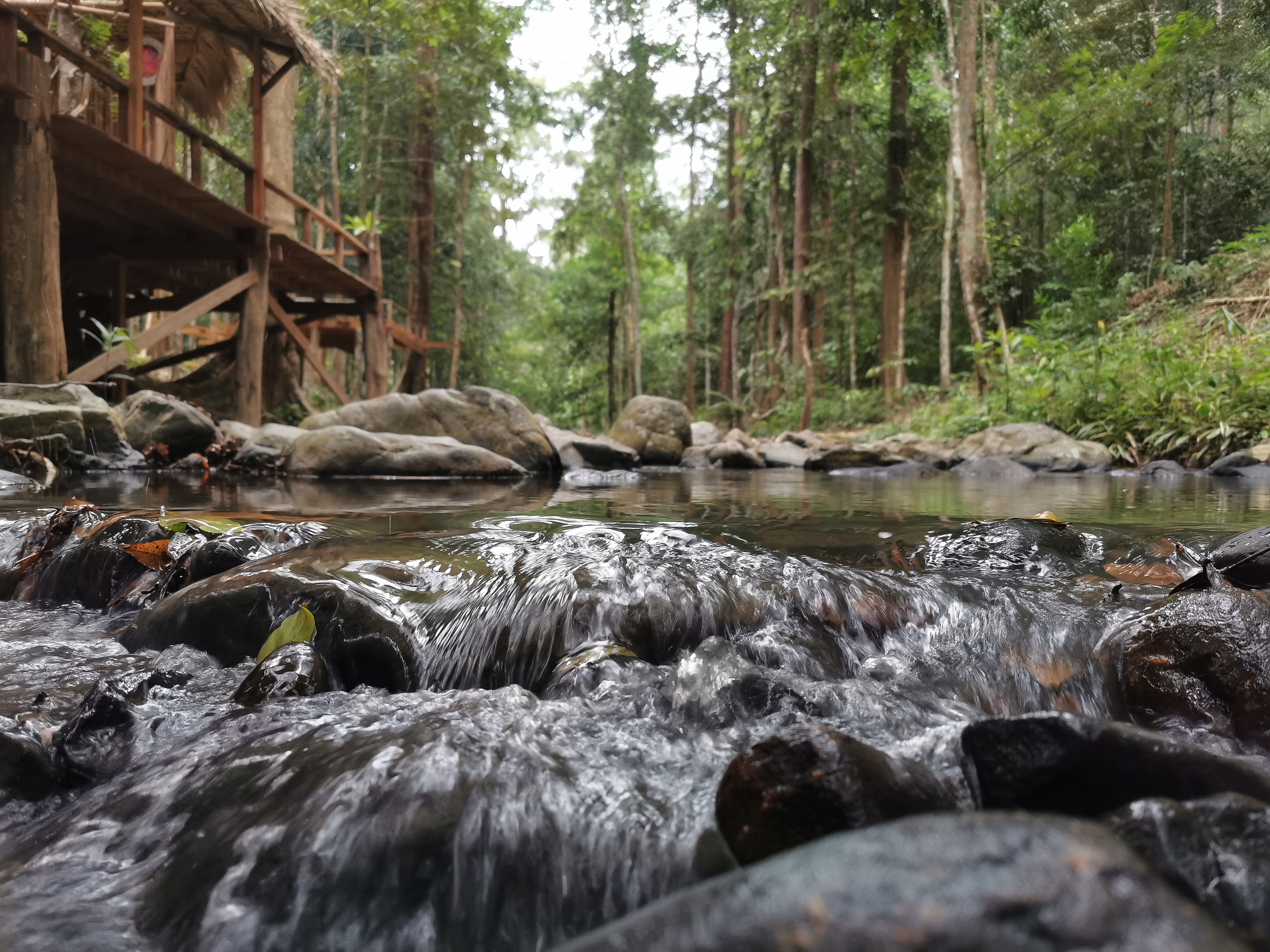
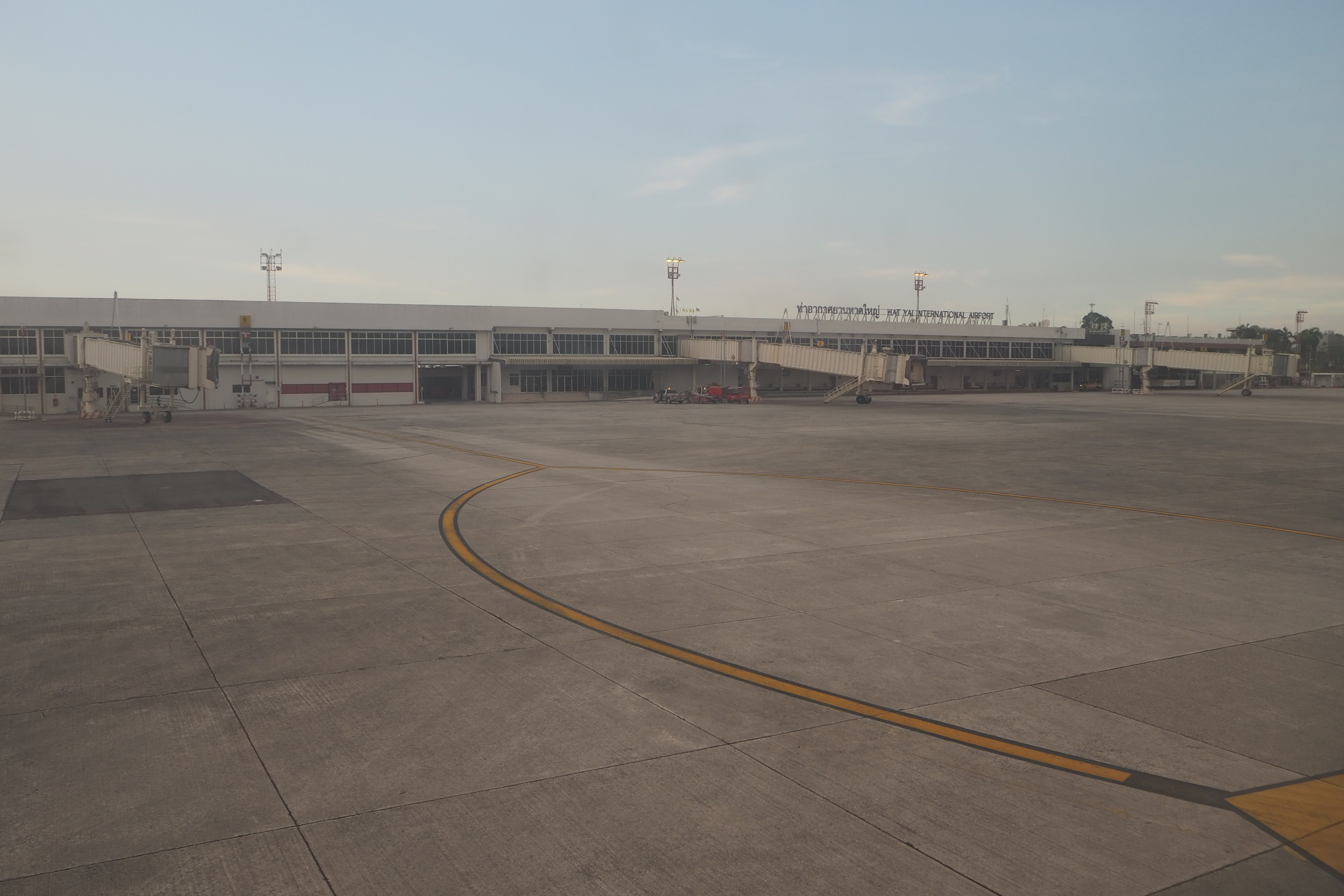
- From left to right, top to bottom : Hat Yai, Panorama of Songkhla from Tang Kuan Hill, Tinsulanon Stadium, Tinsulanonda Bridge, Khao Nam Khang National Park, Hat Yai International Airport

- Flag Seal
- Mottoes: นกน้ำเพลินตา สมิหลาเพลินใจ เมืองใหญ่สองทะเล เสน่ห์สะพานป๋า ศูนย์การค้าแดนใต้ ("Dazzling water birds. Pleasant Samila (Beach). Great city of the two seas. Charm of Tinsulanonda Bridge. The commercial center of the South.")
- Map of Thailand highlighting Songkhla province
- Coordinates: 7°12′19″N 100°35′49″E
- Country: Thailand
- Capital: Songkhla
- Largest City: Hat Yai

Government
  - Governor: Chotnarin Kerdsom

Area
  - Total: 7,741 km^{2} (2,989 sq mi)
  - Rank: 26th

Population (2024)
  - Total: ▼1,431,107
  - Rank: 11th
  - Density: 185/km^{2} (480/sq mi)
  - Rank: 15th

Human Achievement Index
  - HAI (2022): 0.6575 "somewhat high" Ranked 16th

GDP
  - Total: baht 242 billion (US$8.0 billion) (2019)
- Time zone: UTC+7 (ICT)
- Postal code: 90xxx
- Calling code: 074
- ISO 3166 code: TH-90
- Website: songkhla.go.th

Songkhla Provincial Administrative Organization องค์การบริหารส่วนจังหวัดสงขลา
- Provincial Administrative Organization
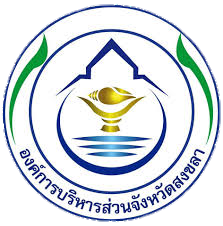
- Seal
- Interactive map of Songkhla Provincial Administrative Organization

Government
  - Type: Local administrative divisions
  - Body: Songkhla Provincial Administrative Organization
  - President: Suphit Phithaktham
- Website: songkhlapao.go.th

Songkhla (Thai: สงขลา, pronounced [sǒŋ.kʰlǎː], Malay: Singgora) is one of the southern provinces (changwat) of Thailand. Neighboring provinces are (from west clockwise) Satun, Phatthalung, Nakhon Si Thammarat, Pattani, and Yala. To the south it borders Kedah and Perlis of Malaysia. Songkhla Lake, the largest natural lake in Thailand, lies in the north of the province.

In contrast to most other provinces, the capital Songkhla is not the largest city in the province. The much newer city of Hat Yai is considerably larger, with about twice the population of Songkhla, and is often taken for the capital.

== Etymology ==
The name Songkhla is actually the Thai corruption of Singgora (Jawi: سيڠڬورا); its original name means "the city of lions" in Malay (not to be confused with Singapura). This refers to a lion-shaped mountain near the city of Songkhla.

== History ==
=== Early states ===
Songkhla was the seat of an old Malay kingdom under strong Srivijayan influence. In ancient times (200–1400 CE), Songkhla formed the northern extremity of the Malay Kingdom of Langkasuka. The city-state then succeeded as the Sultanate of Singgora, it later became a tributary of Nakhon Si Thammarat, suffering damage during several attempts to gain independence.

In Arabic and Persian merchants’ records from 1450–1550, Songkhla was firstly known as Singor or Singora.

=== The Sathing Phra isthmus ===
Archaeological excavations on the isthmus between Lake Songkhla and the sea reveal that in the 10th through the 14th century this was a major urbanized area, and a center of international maritime trade, in particular with Quanzhou in China. The long Sanskrit name of the state that existed there has been lost; its short Sanskrit name was Singhapura ("Lion City") (not to be confused with Singapura), a city state. The short vernacular name was Satingpra, coming from the Mon-Khmer sting/steng/stang (meaning "river") and the Sanskrit pura ("city"). The ruins of the important port city of Satingpra are just few kilometres north of Songkhla city.

Excavation has recorded the town and its neighbours in more detail. The moated town of Sathing Phra is rectangular and covers about 0.9 km^{2}, 500 m from the gulf and 3 km from the lagoon. Two large brick building foundations were uncovered there in 1979–80, and Tang, Song, Yuan and Ming wares give it port activity from the 7th to the 15th century. At Khok Thong, an inner port on the lagoon side active from the 7th to the 17th century, the finds include a carnelian intaglio seal cut with a bull and a crescent, glass beads, gold ornaments, a shivalinga, stupa finials and a brick shrine. Khao Khuha, a rock-cut Hindu temple of the 7th or 8th century, has two chambers and a painted om; a bronze Agastya of the 8th century came from the nearby Phang Phra pond and a torso of Vishnu of the 10th from the same area. Antefixes of candrashala form at Khao Noi are compared with examples from U Thong and from An Giang in southern Vietnam.

A kiln site at Pa-O, 17 km south of the old town, produced kendi water vessels in the 12th and 13th centuries which have been recovered at Trowulan and Kota Cina in Indonesia, Muara Jambi in Sumatra and Polonnaruwa in Sri Lanka. Siriporn Sanghiran notes that no Chinese or other foreign account mentions this export at all. She also reports the identification of the Sathing Phra town with a place named Singkhara-nagara, which rests on the work of Amara Srisuchat rather than on an inscription or a foreign notice.

Two stone images of Viṣṇu are recorded from Sathing Phra. The first, 75 by 27 centimetres, is in the Songkhla National Museum (inv. 716/2522) and is usually dated between the mid-7th and the mid-8th century; the second, 63.5 cm high and lacking head, arms and feet, is dated to about the 7th century. Paul A. Lavy uses the first as a case study in dating method, stating that his aim is not to revise the chronology but to question the reasoning by which earlier scholars reached it.

When Pierre Dupont first published the image in 1941 he gave its find-spot as Si Maha Phot district in Prachinburi province. The error was repeated for twenty-five years until Stanley O'Connor corrected it in 1966, and Lavy holds that it contributed to judgements made about the statue. Dupont dated the image late among the mitred Viṣṇus of Thailand on its proportions, its garment and what he called a deformed halo, and Jean Boisselier assigned it to the 8th century on grounds of aberrant aesthetics and regressive technique. A sixth-century date also entered circulation, which Lavy traces to a misreading of O'Connor's monograph of 1972, where no date was advocated.

Lavy argues that the reasoning rested on an assumption Dupont himself called one of the axioms of Southeast Asian archaeology: that the more an image resembles classical Indian sculpture, the older it is. He also corrects two points of fact. The legs of the image are disengaged rather than left in relief, and there is no indication of a break where a right-hand strut would have stood, so the image may have carried fewer supports than other early Southeast Asian Viṣṇus, not more. Hiram Woodward compared the attachment of the cakra and conch to the halo with Early Western Cāḷukya work in Karnāṭaka, a comparison Lavy extends while noting its limits.

=== Under Ayutthaya ===
During 1619–1680, Songkhla Town beside Red Hill was very prosperous in trading with other countries by Malay governors migrating from Indonesia. They escaped the Dutch trade monopoly to trade freely at Songkhla, with English support. At the first period, during 1619–1642 the governor of Songkhla was Muslim. Later, in 1642–1680 the governor of Songkhla rebelled against Ayutthaya; the town was suppressed by King Narai and afterwards neglected. Then, Phatthalung took control of it. From 1699 to 1776, Songkhla reformed at the new location in Laemson called Songkhla Town at Laemson Side which is opposite to the current location of Songkhla town.

=== Siamese control ===
In 1836, King Rama III instructed Phraya Vichiankiri (Tianseng) to build the city wall fortress. During the construction of the wall, Tuanku Ahmadsa-ad, together with the rulers from Syburi, Pattani and seven other provinces, attacked Songkhla. After their conquering all the rebellion, the fortress and the city wall were carried on. Also, the city pillar was set up and the town of Songkhla was moved to the east of Laem Son called Bo Yang District, which is now in the area of Songkhla Municipality.

Since the 18th century, Songkhla has been firmly under Thai suzerainty. In 1909, Songkhla was formally annexed by Siam as part of Anglo-Siamese Treaty of 1909, negotiated with the British Empire, in which Siam gave up its claim to Kelantan in return for Britain recognizing Siam's right to the provinces north of that.

=== The Na Songkhla family ===
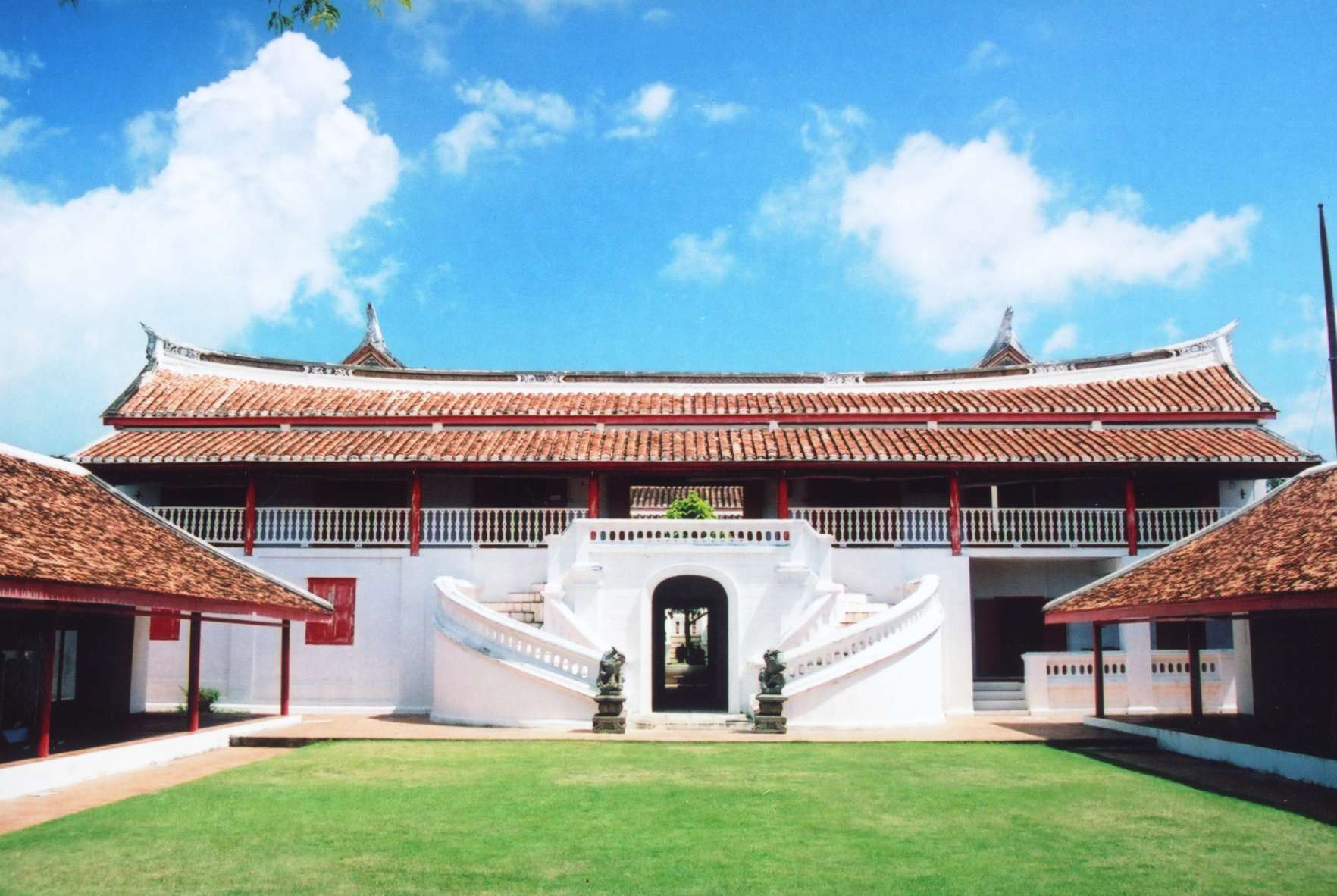
The Na Songkhla family's residence, now used as the Songkhla National Museum

In the 18th century many Chinese immigrants, especially from Guangdong and Fujian, came to the province. Quickly rising to economic wealth, one of them won the bidding for the major tax farm of the province in 1769, establishing the Na Songkhla (from Songkhla) family as the most wealthy and influential. In 1777 the family also gained political power, when the old governor was dismissed and Luang Inthakhiri (Yiang, Chinese name Wu Rang (呉譲)) became the new governor. In 1786 the old governor started an uprising, which was put down after four months. The position was thereafter inherited in the family and was held by eight of his descendants until 1901, when Phraya Wichiankhiri (Chom) was honorably retired as part of the administrative reforms of Prince Damrong Rajanubhab. The family's former home was converted into the Songkhla National Museum in 1953.

=== Twentieth century ===
In 1932, Monthon Thesaphiban or the administrative subdivisions was dissolved and changed to provincial administration, Songkhla then becomes one of the provinces in the south of Thailand.

Songkhla was the scene of heavy fighting when the Imperial Japanese Army invaded Thailand on 8 December 1941 and parts of the city were destroyed.

== Geography ==
The province is on the Malay Peninsula, on the coast of the Gulf of Thailand. The highest elevation is Khao Mai Kaeo at 821 meters.

In the north of the province is Songkhla Lake, the largest natural lake in Thailand. This shallow lake covers an area of 1,040 km^{2}, and has a south–north extent of 78 kilometers. At its mouth on the Gulf of Thailand, near the city of Songkhla, the water becomes brackish. A small population of Irrawaddy dolphins live in the lake, but are in danger of extinction due to accidental capture by the nets of the local fishing industry.

Songkhla province hosts three national parks. San Kala Khiri covers of mountain highlands on the Thai-Malay border. Khao Nam Khang is also in the boundary mountains. Namtok Sai Khao on the Pattani-Songkhla border.
The total forest area is 866 km^{2} (334 sq mi) or 11.2 percent of provincial area.
Chinese Communist guerrillas inhabited this region until the 1980s

=== National parks ===
Two of the three national parks in region 6 (Songkhla) and Namtok Sai Khao in region 6 (Pattani branch) are the protected areas of Songkhla province.

Khao Nam Khang National Park	212 km^{2} (82 sq mi)	(13,744)
San Kala Khiri National Park	143 km^{2} (55 sq mi)	(5,472)
Namtok Sai Khao National Park	70 km^{2} (27 sq mi)	(120,699)

=== Wildlife sanctuaries ===
The two wildlife sanctuaries in region 6 (Songkhla) are the protected areas of Songkhla province.

Khao Banthat Wildlife Sanctuary	1,267 km^{2} (489 sq mi)
Ton Nga Wildlife Sanctuary	182 km^{2} (70 sq mi)

=== Non-hunting areas ===
There are a total of seven non-hunting areas in region 6 (Songkhla), of which four are in Songkhla province.

Khao Pa Chang-Laem Kham	235 km^{2} (91 sq mi)
Khao Reng	109 km^{2} (42 sq mi)
Pa Krat	4 km^{2} (1.5 sq mi)
Phru Khang Khao	1 km^{2} (0.39 sq mi)

Location protected areas of Songkhla

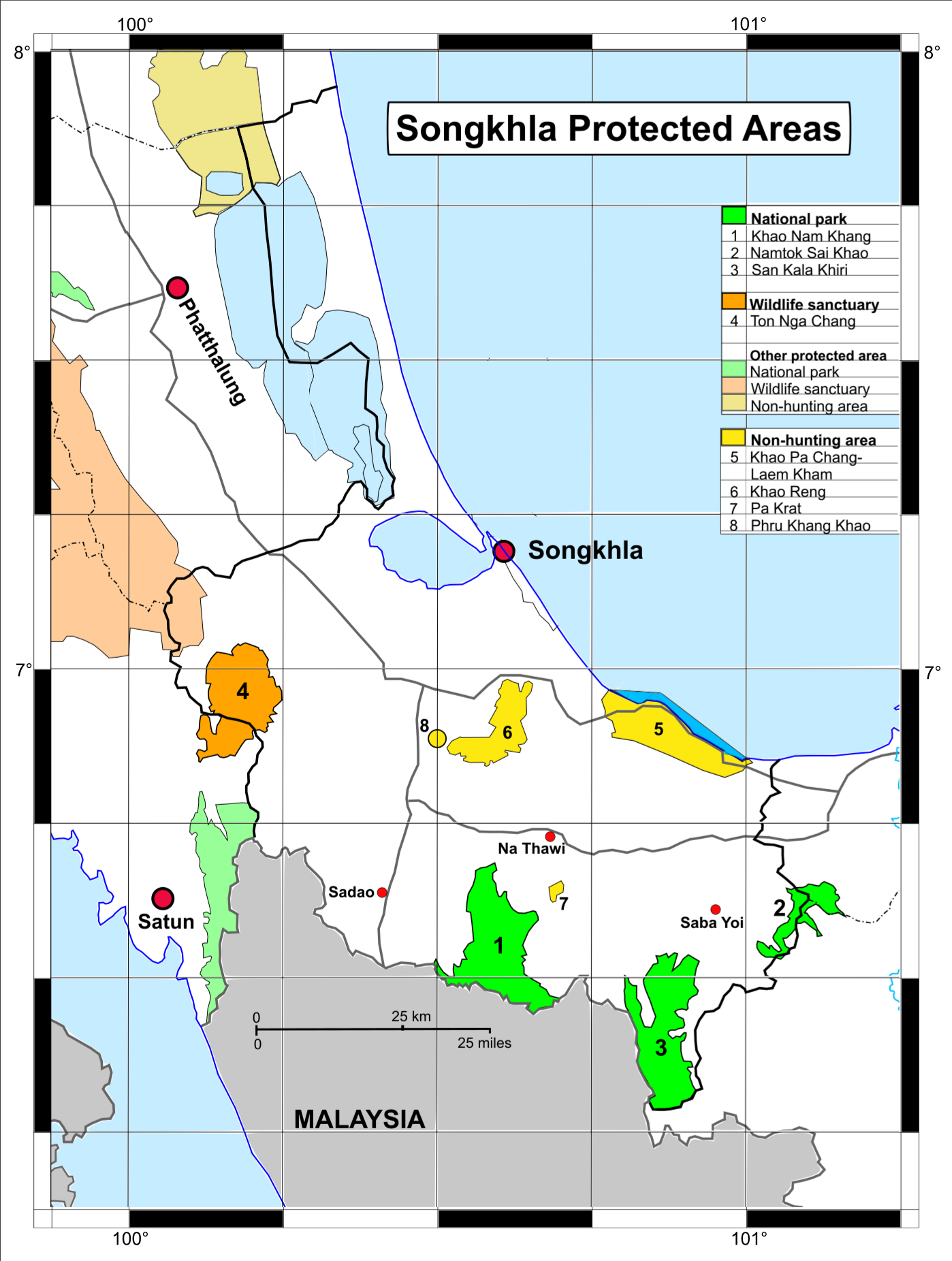
Songkhla protected areas

	National park
1	Khao Nam Khang
2	Namtok Sai Khao
3	San Kala Khiri

	Wildlife sanctuary
4	Ton Nga Chang

	Non-hunting area
5	Khao Pa Chang- Laem Kham
6	Khao Reng
7	Pa Krat
8	Phru Khang Khao

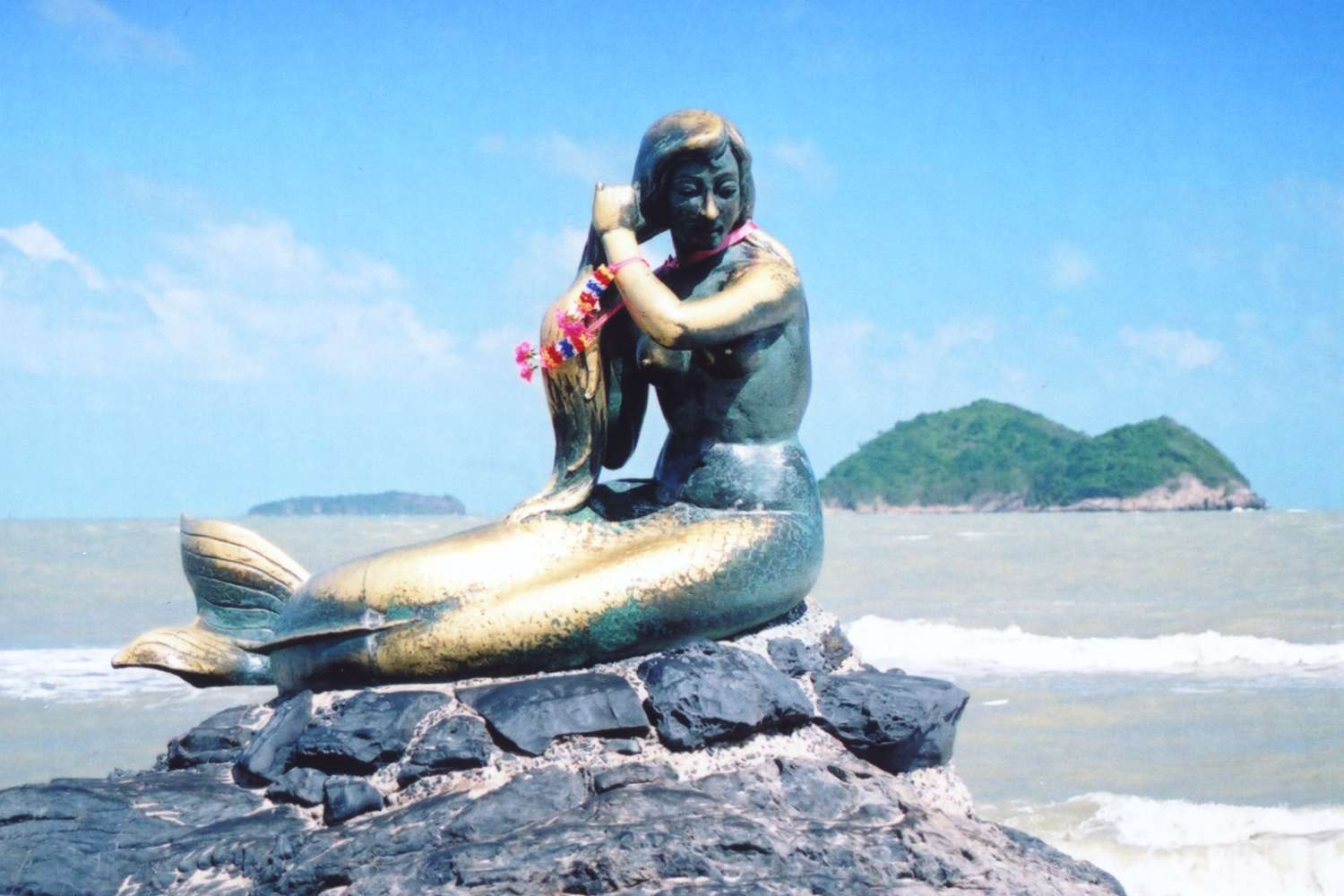
Mermaid statue at Laem Samila

Within the boundaries of the city of Songkhla is Cape Samila Beach, the most popular beach in the province. The famous mermaid statue can be found here. The two islands Ko Nu and Ko Maew (Mouse and Cat Islands), not far from the beach, are also popular landmarks, and a preferred fishing ground. According to a local folk tale, a cat, mouse and dog were traveling on a Chinese ship, when they attempted to steal a crystal from a merchant. While trying to swim ashore, both the cat and the mouse drowned and became the two islands; the dog reached the beach, then died and become the hill Khao Tang Kuan. The crystal turned into the white sandy beach.

== Symbols ==
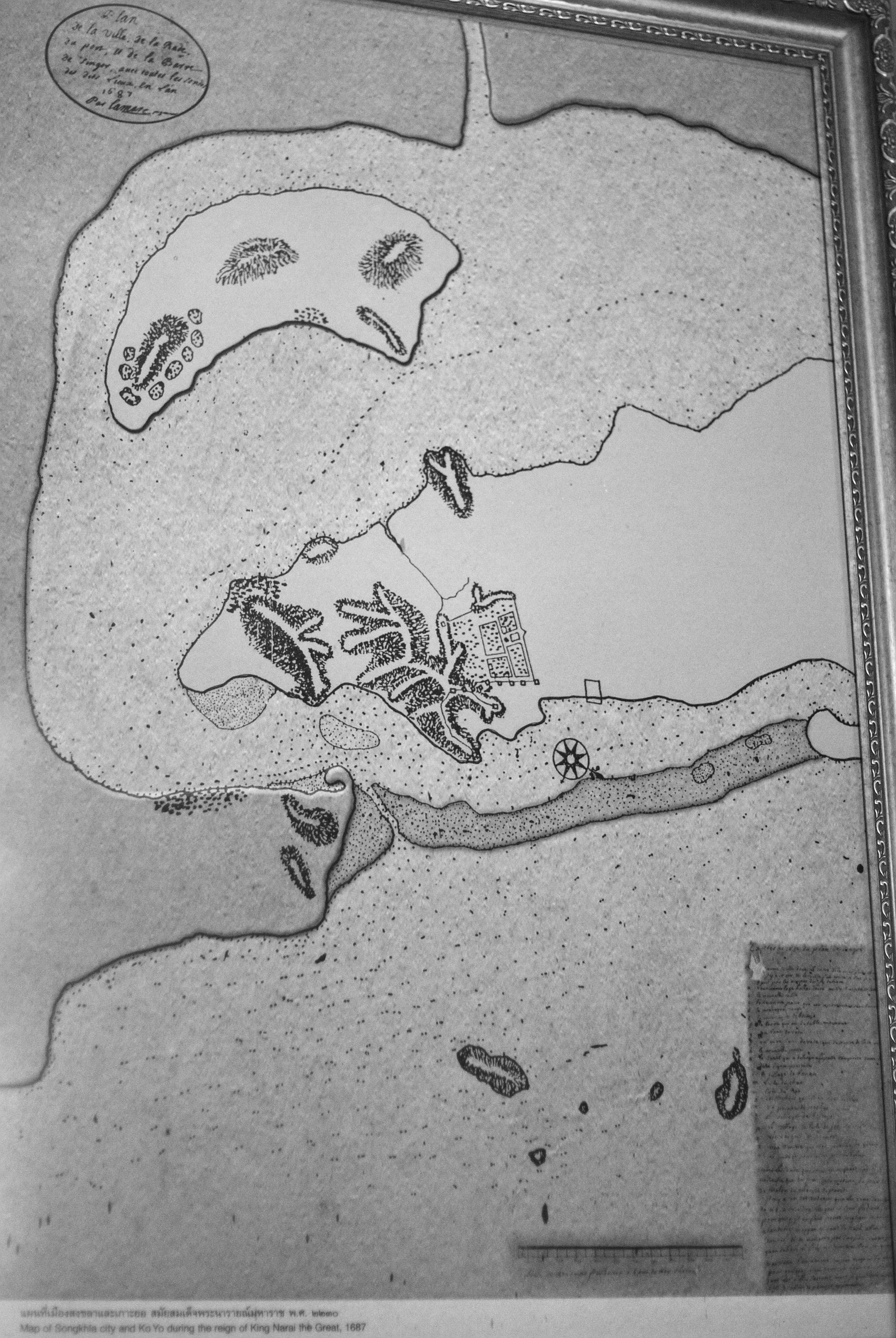
Map of Songkhla, during the reign of King Narai the Great, 1687 (West is top)

The provincial seal shows a conch shell on a Phan (tray) with glass decorations. The origin of the conch shell is unclear, but the most widely adopted interpretation is that it was a decoration on the jacket of the Prince of Songkhla.

The provincial tree is the Sa-dao-thiam (Azadirachta excelsa). The brackish fish green scat (Scatophagus argus) is the provincial aquatic life.

== Demographics ==
Religion in Songkhla (2018)
religion	percent
Buddhism	63.71%
Islam	33.16%
Other	3.13%

Buddhists make up two-thirds to three-fourths of the population, most of whom are of native Thai or Thai Chinese descent. One-fourth to one-third of the population are Muslim, most of them belong to a Thai-speaking Muslim group, called Sam-Sam ( 'mixed' ). People claiming to be of Malay ethnicity make up a minority among the Muslim populace. The Songkhla Malays are very similar in ethnicity and culture to the Malays of Kelantan, Malaysia. They speak the language Songkhla Malay which is a derivative of Kelantan-Pattani Malay.

== Administrative divisions ==
=== Provincial government ===
Songkhla is divided into 16 districts (amphoe), which are further subdivided into 127 subdistricts (tambon) and 987 villages (muban). The districts of Chana (Malay: Chenok), Thepha (Malay: Tiba) were detached from Mueang Pattani and transferred to Songkhla during the Thesaphiban reforms around 1900.

Map of sixteen districts

Number	Name	Thai	Malay	Jawi
1	Mueang Songkhla	เมืองสงขลา	Bandaraya Singgora	بنداراي سيڠڬورا
2	Sathing Phra	สทิงพระ	Candi Barat	چندي بارت
3	Chana	จะนะ	Cenok	چنوق
4	Na Thawi	นาทวี	Nawi	ناوي
5	Thepha	เทพา	Tiba	تيبا
6	Saba Yoi	สะบ้าย้อย	Sebayu	سبايو
7	Ranot	ระโนด	Renut	رنوت
8	Krasae Sin	กระแสสินธุ์	Kota Ayer	كوتا ا ٔير
9	Rattaphum	รัตภูมิ	Tanah Merah	تانه ميره
10	Sadao	สะเดา	Sendawa	سنداوا
11	Hat Yai	หาดใหญ่	Pantai Besar	ڤنتاي بسر
12	Na Mom	นาหม่อม	Dataran Cengal Pasir Agung	داتارن چڠل ڤاسير اڬوڠ
13	Khuan Niang	ควนเนียง	Kuning	كونيڠ
14	Bang Klam	บางกล่ำ	Kampung Pulau Bulat	كمڤوڠ ڤولاو بولت
15	Singhanakhon	สิงหนคร	Singapura	سيڠاڤورا
16	Khlong Hoi Khong	คลองหอยโข่ง	Terusan Siput Gondang	تروسن سيڤوت ڬوندڠ

=== Local government ===
As of 26 November 2019 there are: one Songkhla Provincial Administration Organisation (ongkan borihan suan changwat) and 48 municipal (thesaban) areas in the province. Songkhla and Hat Yai have city (thesaban nakhon) status. Further 11 have town (thesaban mueang) status and there are 35 subdistrict municipalities (thesaban tambon). The non-municipal areas are administered by 92 Subdistrict Administrative Organisations - SAO (ongkan borihan suan tambon).

== Health ==
Songkhla is served by a larger number of public hospitals than private hospitals. The main hospitals for Songkhla province are Hatyai Hospital and Songkhla Hospital, both operated by the Ministry of Public Health. Songklanagarind Hospital is also another major hospital located in Hat Yai, but is operated by the Faculty of Medicine, Prince of Songkla University, which is the largest medical school in the South of Thailand.

== Economy ==
Songkhla province is an energy hub. It earns 100 billion baht each year from a gas separation plant, power generation, and oil. The gas separation plant sells 35 billion baht worth of gas per year to EGAT. Power generation accounts for 45 billion baht. Offshore oil rigs in the vicinity of Ko Nu produce 20,000 barrels of oil per day worth 30 billion baht per year. If a proposed coal-fired electrical generation plan in Thepha District goes ahead, energy earnings could rise to 300 billion baht per year.

== Transport ==
=== Road ===
Phet Kasem Road, running all the way from Bangkok, ends at the border crossing to Malaysia in Sadao. Asian highway 2 and 18 also run through the province. Of note is the Tinsulanond Bridge, which crosses Songkhla Lake to connect the narrow land east of the lake at the coast with the main southern part of the province. With a length of 2.6 km it is the longest concrete bridge in Thailand. Built in 1986, the bridge consists of two parts. The southern 1,140 m connects Mueang district with the island Ko Yo, and the northern part of 1,800 m to Ban Khao Khiao.

Kanchanawanit Road, which runs from Songkhla town, though Hat Yai, and all the way to the Malaysian border at Sadao District, is considered the unofficial dividing line separating the Thai south from its deep south, Muslim-majority region.

=== Rail ===
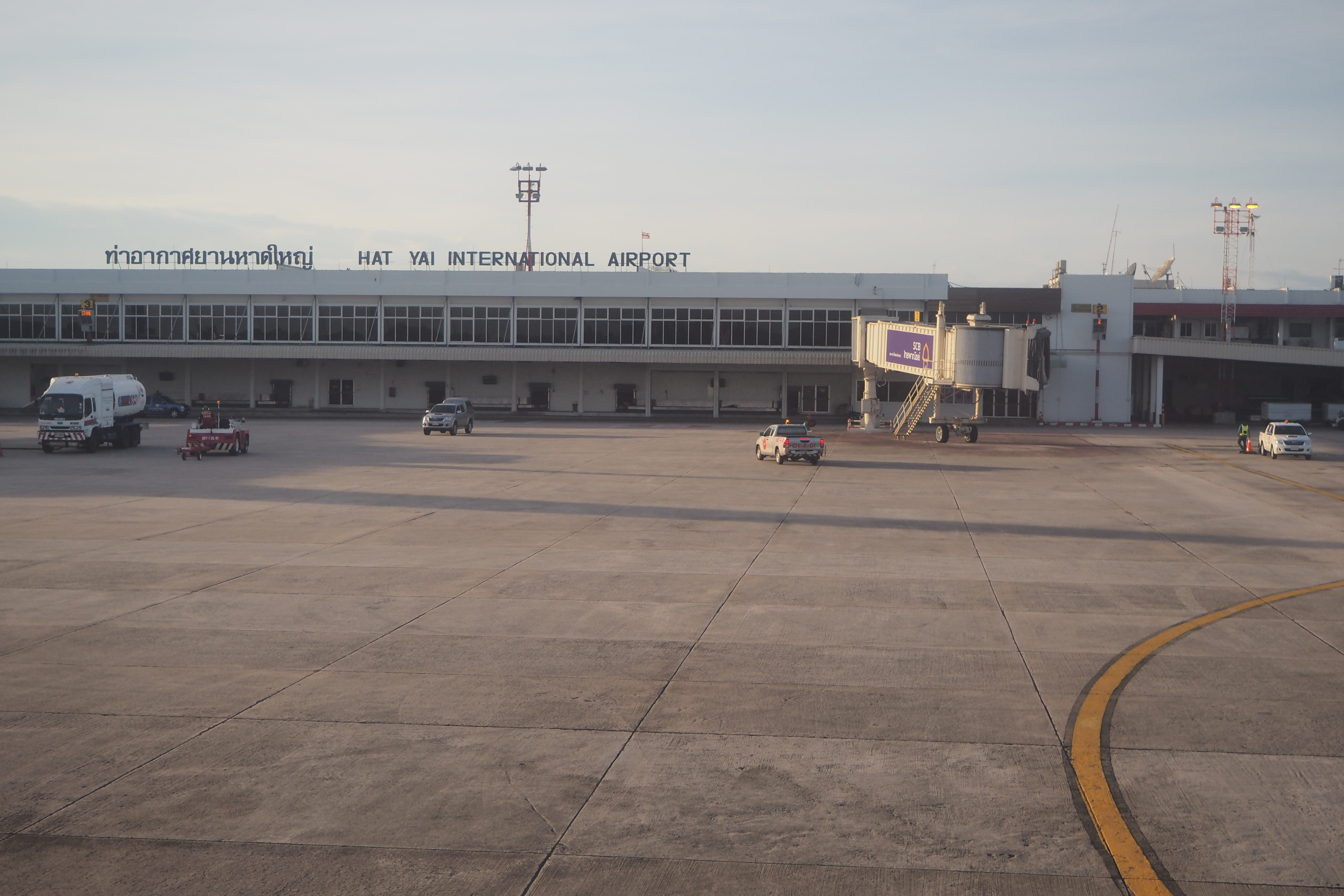
Hat Yai International Airport

The southern railway operated by the State Railway of Thailand runs through the province, and continues on into Malaysia, with Hat Yai Junction being the main railway station. It is a junction for the railway link to Malaysia through Padang Besar Town, where there are two stations: Padang Besar (Thai) on the Thai side and Padang Besar on the Malay side. Immigration is done on the Malay side. The other route from Hat Yai Junction goes further south to Pattani (Khok Pho), Yala, Tanyong Mat and Su-ngai Kolok. In the past, a railway line connected the town of Songkhla with Hat Yai, but it was closed in 1978 and is now partly dismantled and partly overgrown.

=== Air ===
Songkhla is served by Hat Yai International Airport in Khlong Hoi Khong District.

== Human achievement index 2022 ==
Health	Education	Employment	Income
35	39	28	18
Housing	Family	Transport	Participation
60	53	8	27
Province Songkhla, with an HAI 2022 value of 0.6575 is "somewhat high", occupies place 16 in the ranking.

Since 2003, United Nations Development Programme (UNDP) in Thailand has tracked progress on human development at sub-national level using the Human achievement index (HAI), a composite index covering all the eight key areas of human development. National Economic and Social Development Board (NESDB) has taken over this task since 2017.

Rank	Classification
1 - 13	"high"
14 - 29	"somewhat high"
30 - 45	"average"
46 - 61	"somewhat low"
62 - 77	"low"

Map with provinces and HAI 2022 rankings

== Culture ==
The most important Buddhist temple of the province is Wat Matchimawat (also named Wat Klang), on Saiburi road in the city of Songkhla itself.

Held in the first night of October, the Chak Phra tradition is a Buddhist festival specific to the south of Thailand. It is celebrated with Buddha boat processions or sports events like a run up Khao Tang Kuan hill.

In September or October at the Chinese Lunar festival the Thai-Chinese present their offerings to the moon or Queen of the Heavens in gratitude for past and future fortunes.

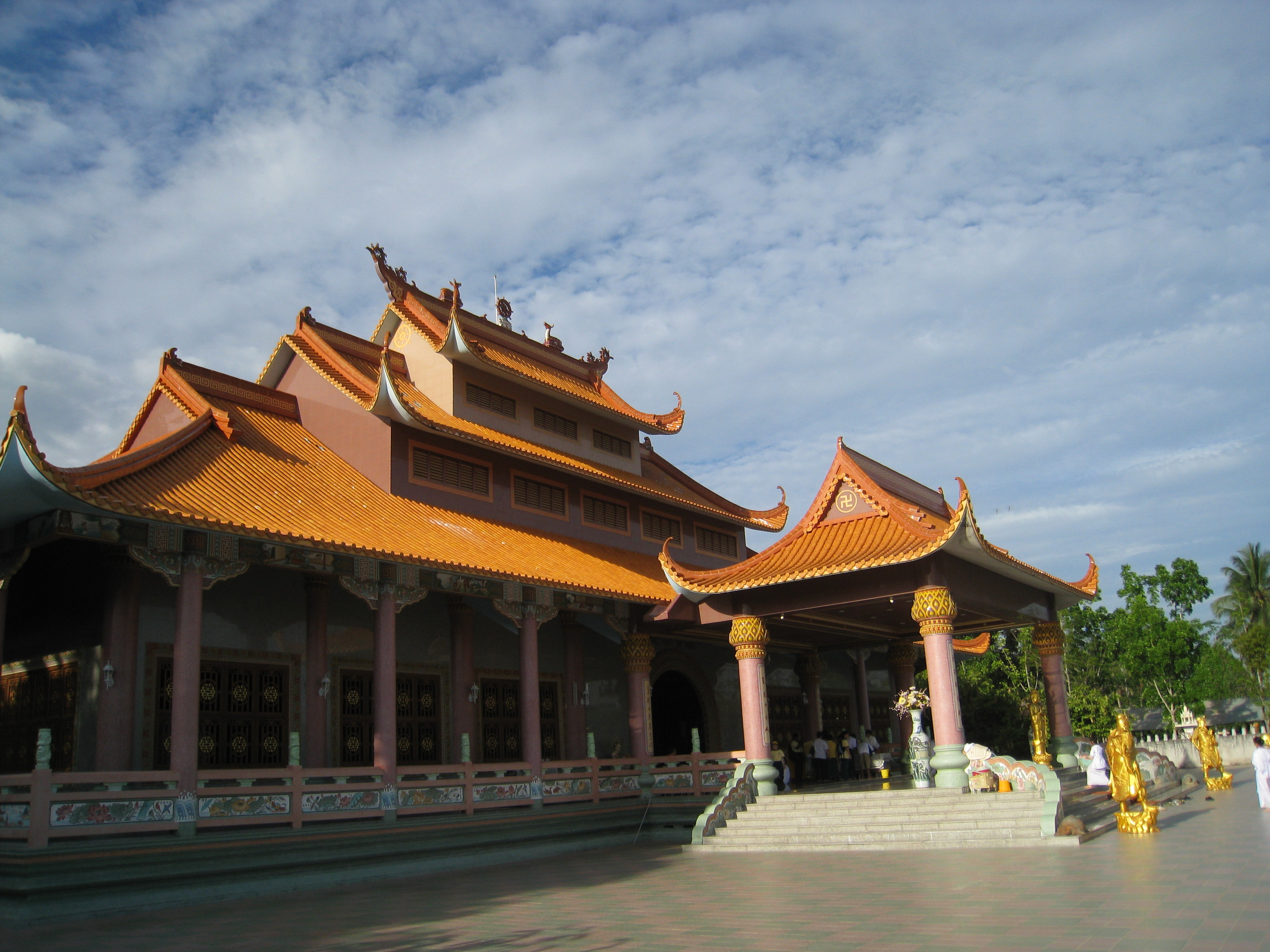
Buddhist temple in Sadao

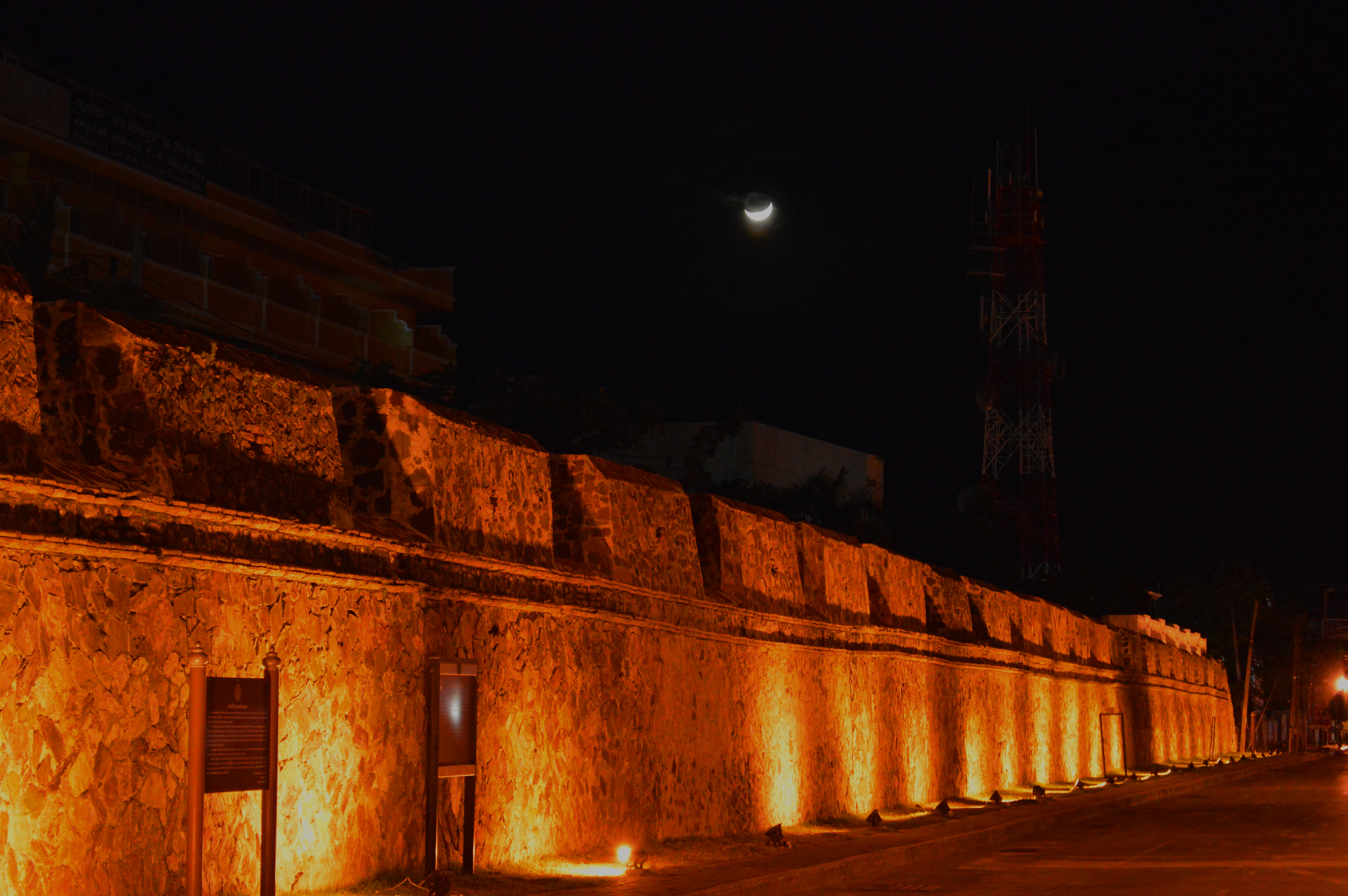
Old city walls of Songkhla

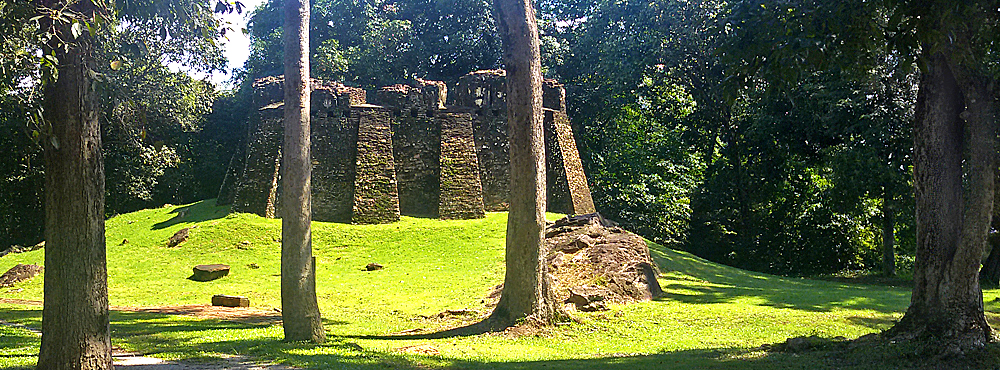
Old Fort on Songkhla

== Internal security ==
Songkhla was not initially affected by the outbreak of Pattani Separatism, which began in 2004. However, bombs planted in 2005 and 2007 stoked fears the insurgency might spread to Songkhla province.

As of 2018, the provisions of Thailand's Internal Security Act remain imposed on the districts of Chana, Na Thawi, Saba Yoi, and Thepha for reasons of national security. All but Chana share a border with Malaysia or Pattani province (Malay majority). Internal security restrictions, maintained by Thailand's Internal Security Operations Command (ISOC) can result in curfews, prohibited entry, or prohibited transport of goods. It is considered one step below the imposition of full martial law.

== Sport ==
Songkhla football club participates in Thai League 2, the 2nd tier of Thai football league system. The Samila Mermaid (Thai: เงือกสมิหลา) plays their home matches at Tinsulanon Stadium.
