= Sammy Gutiérrez =

Mexican boxer

Personal information
- Nickname: Guty
- Born: Samuel Gutiérrez; 31 December 1985 (age 40) San Martín Texmelucan, Mexico
- Height: 5 ft 3 in (160 cm)
- Weight: Mini flyweight; Light flyweight

Boxing career
- Reach: 61 1/2 in (156 cm)
- Stance: Orthodox

Boxing record
- Total fights: 46
- Wins: 33
- Win by KO: 23
- Losses: 11
- Draws: 2

Sammy Gutiérrez (born 31 December 1985), is a Mexican former professional boxer in the Strawweight division. Guty was born in San Martín Texmelucan de Labastida, Puebla, Mexico.

== Professional career ==
On October 23, 2010, he became the interim WBA Minimumweight champion by beating Colombian Luis Carrillo by 3rd-round TKO. He would defend the title once against Renan Trongco, before losing it to Juan Palacios. He would move up a weight class & challenge Donnie Nietes for the world title, he would lose via third round stoppage.

== Professional boxing record ==
46 fights	33 wins	11 losses
By knockout	23	4
By decision	10	7
Draws	2	

No.	Result	Record	Opponent	Type	Round, time	Date	Location	Notes
46	Loss	33–11–2	Jorge Alberto Arguelles	UD	12	20 Jun 2015	Auditorio Municipal, Ixtacuixtla de Mariano Matamoros, Mexico	For vacant WBC Continental Americas light flyweight title
44	Loss	33–10–2	Donnie Nietes	TKO	3 (12), 2:58	30 Nov 2013	Smart Araneta Coliseum, Quezon City, Philippines	For WBO light flyweight title
44	Loss	33–9–2	Raúl García	TKO	3 (10), 1:25	22 Dec 2012	Auditorio del Bicentenario, Morelia, Mexico	
43	Win	33–8–2	Edgar Martinez	TKO	3 (8)	13 Oct 2012	Centro de Convenciones, Puebla, Mexico	
42	Win	32–8–2	Josue Vega	TKO	8 (8), 2:46	18 Aug 2012	Gimnasio Miguel Hidalgo, Puebla, Mexico	
41	Loss	31–8–2	Armando Torres	MD	10	9 Jun 2012	Gimnasio Manuel Bernardo Aguirre, Chihuahua City, Mexico	
40	Win	31–7–2	Carlos Ruben Dario Ruiz	UD	10	3 Mar 2012	Gimnasio German Evers, Mazatlán, Mexico	
39	Loss	30–7–2	Armando Torres	TKO	8 (12)	10 Dec 2011	Centro de Expositores, Puebla, Mexico	Lost WBC Silver light flyweight title
38	Win	30–6–2	Roilo Golez	TKO	5 (12), 2:06	1 Oct 2011	Centro de Expositores, Puebla, Mexico	Won vacant WBC Silver light flyweight title
37	Win	29–6–2	Rafael Orozco	KO	3 (10), 1:59	30 Jul 2011	Plaza Nuevo Progreso, Guadalajara, Mexico	
36	Loss	28–6–2	Juan Palacios	UD	12	21 May 2011	San Martín Texmelucan, Mexico	Lost WBA interim mini flyweight title
35	Win	28–5–2	Renan Trongco	TKO	6 (12), 2:19	12 Feb 2011	Polideportivo Municipal, Monte Hermoso, Argentina	Retained WBA interim mini flyweight title
34	Win	27–5–2	Luis Carrillo	TKO	3 (12), 1:24	23 Oct 2010	Gimnasio San Damián, San Martín Texmelucan, Mexico	Won WBA interim mini flyweight title
33	Win	26–5–2	Regulo Gamez	KO	2 (10)	14 Aug 2010	Auditorio Hermanos Carreón, Aguascalientes, Mexico	
32	Win	25–5–2	Jesus Hernandez Sierra	TKO	4 (10), 2:35	12 Jun 2010	Centro de Convenciones, Puebla, Mexico	
31	Win	24–5–2	Javier Marquez Clemente	KO	5 (10)	27 Mar 2010	Deportivo Trabajadores del Metro, Mexico City, Mexico	
30	Win	23–5–2	Sammy Reyes	TKO	4 (12)	30 Jan 2010	Gimnasio San Damián, San Martín Texmelucan, Mexico	Retained Mexican mini flyweight title
29	Win	22–5–2	Javier Marquez Clemente	TKO	5 (8)	15 Sep 2009	Auditorio Siglo XXI, Puebla, Mexico	
28	Loss	21–5–2	Raúl García	MD	12	22 Aug 2009	Auditorio Unidad Deportiva, Los Cabos, Mexico	For IBF mini flyweight title
27	Win	21–4–2	Job Solano	UD	12	23 May 2009	Woda Night Club, Mexico City, Mexico	Won vacant Mexican mini flyweight title
26	Loss	20–4–2	Omar Niño Romero	UD	10	6 Dec 2008	Palenque Calle 2, Zapopan, Mexico	
25	Loss	20–3–2	Nkosinathi Joyi	TKO	7 (12)	27 Jun 2008	Orient Theatre, East London, South Africa	For IBO mini flyweight title
24	Win	20–2–2	Ivan Meneses	UD	10	29 Feb 2008	Estadio de Beisbol Arturo C. Nahl, La Paz, Mexico	
23	Win	19–2–2	Gabriel Ramirez	SD	12	31 Aug 2007	Deportivo Corona, La Paz, Mexico	Won vacant AMBP mini flyweight title
22	Loss	18–2–2	Raúl García	SD	12	15 Jun 2007	Estadio de Beisbol Arturo C. Nahl, La Paz, Mexico	Lost Mexican mini flyweight title
21	Win	18–1–2	Job Solano	SD	12	11 May 2007	Salon 21, Mexico City, Mexico	Retained Mexican mini flyweight title
20	Win	17–1–2	Ramon Flores	KO	2 (10)	30 Mar 2007	Ciudad Nezahualcóyotl, Mexico	
19	Win	16–1–2	Oscar Martinez	MD	12	15 Sep 2006	Salon Fascinacion, Mexico City, Mexico	Retained Mexican mini flyweight title
18	Draw	15–1–2	Raúl García	PTS	12	2 Jun 2006	Estadio de Beisbol Arturo C. Nahl, La Paz, Mexico	Retained Mexican mini flyweight title
17	Win	15–1–1	Armando Torres	TKO	3 (8)	30 Mar 2006	Salon 21, Mexico City, Mexico	
16	Win	14–1–1	Juan de Dios Gomez	TKO	4 (12), 2:46	21 Dec 2005	Gimnasio de la Nueva Atzacoalco, Mexico City, Mexico	Won vacant WBC FECARBOX light flyweight title
15	Win	13–1–1	Jose Ortiz	UD	12	21 Oct 2005	Plaza de Toros, Nuevo Laredo, Mexico	Won vacant Mexican mini flyweight title
14	Win	12–1–1	Branni Guerrero	TKO	4 (10)	28 Jul 2005	Discoteca Esfinge, Ciudad Nezahualcóyotl, Mexico	
13	Win	11–1–1	Martin Zepeda	UD	10	19 May 2005	Salon 21, Mexico City, Mexico	
12	Win	10–1–1	Branni Guerrero	TKO	7 (10), 2:18	9 Feb 2005	Salon Fascinacion, Mexico City, Mexico	
11	Win	9–1–1	Julio César Miranda	UD	10	17 Dec 2004	Arena Coliseo, Monterrey, Mexico	
10	Loss	8–1–1	Oscar Martinez	MD	8	20 Aug 2004	Centro de Convenciones, Tlalnepantla de Baz, Mexico	
9	Win	8–0–1	Ricardo Tovar	TKO	4 (6)	14 Jul 2004	Centro de Convenciones, Tlalnepantla de Baz, Mexico	
8	Win	7–0–1	Arnoldo Perez	KO	1 (6)	7 Apr 2004	Centro de Convenciones, Tlalnepantla de Baz, Mexico	
7	Draw	6–0–1	Jose Guadalupe Martinez	PTS	6	24 Feb 2004	Plaza de Toros, Nuevo Laredo, Mexico	
6	Win	6–0	Miguel Angel Lopez	KO	2 (6)	28 Nov 2003	San Martín Texmelucan, Mexico	
5	Win	5–0	Jose Manuel Lopez	KO	2 (6)	15 Oct 2003	Arena Isabel, Cuernavaca, Mexico	
4	Win	4–0	Pablo De Jesus	UD	4	28 Aug 2003	Salon La Maraka, Mexico City, Mexico	
3	Win	3–0	Oscar Saturnino	TKO	3 (4)	24 Jul 2003	Salon La Maraka, Mexico City, Mexico	
2	Win	2–0	Carlos Alberto Banuelos	TKO	3 (4)	26 Jun 2003	Centro de Espectaculos La Maraka, Mexico City, Mexico	
1	Win	1–0	Benjamin Pintor	TKO	2 (4)	10 Apr 2003	Foro Las Americas, Mexico City, Mexico	

Sporting positions
Regional boxing titles
Vacant Title last held by Lorenzo Trejo	Mexican mini-flyweight champion October 21, 2005 – June 15, 2007	Succeeded by Raúl García
Vacant Title last held by Édgar Sosa	WBC FECARBOX light-flyweight champion December 21, 2005 – 2006; Vacated	Vacant Title next held by Édgar Sosa
Vacant Title last held by Raúl García	Mexican mini-flyweight champion May 23, 2009 – 2010; Vacated	Vacant Title next held by Javier Martínez
Vacant Title last held by Pedro Guevara	WBC Silver light-flyweight champion October 1, 2011 – December 10, 2011	Succeeded by Armando Torres
World boxing titles
Vacant Title last held by Katsunari Takayama	WBA mini-flyweight champion Interim title October 23, 2010 – May 21, 2011	Succeeded by Juan Palacios
