= Isaac Bustos =

Mexican boxer (born 1975)

Personal information
- Nickname: Tortas
- Born: February 16, 1975 (age 51) Mexico City, Distrito Federal, Mexico
- Height: 5 ft 4 in (163 cm)
- Weight: Mini flyweight

Boxing career
- Reach: 72 in (183 cm)
- Stance: Orthodox

Boxing record
- Total fights: 38
- Wins: 25
- Win by KO: 13
- Losses: 10
- Draws: 3

Isaac Bustos (born February 16, 1975) is a Mexican former professional boxer who competed from 1995 to 2009. He held the WBC mini flyweight title from 2004 to 2005.

== Professional career ==
Isaac won his first NABF Championship by beating veteran Jesus Vargas.

=== WBC Minimumweight Championship ===
Bustos won the WBC Minimumweight Championship by upsetting an undefeated Eagle Den Junlaphan by T.K.O. in the fourth round. He lost his title to Katsunari Takayama in his first defence by unanimous decision. In his next fight he would also lose a unanimous decision to WBO Minimumweight Champion Iván Calderón

== Professional boxing record ==
38 fights	25 wins	10 losses
By knockout	13	3
By decision	10	7
By disqualification	2	0
Draws	3	

No.	Result	Record	Opponent	Type	Round, time	Date	Location	Notes
38	Loss	25–10–3	(United States) David Gaspar	TKO	6 (10), 2:35	16 May 2009	Auditorio Municipal, Tijuana, Mexico	
37	Loss	25–9–3	(Japan) Daiki Kameda	KO	3 (10), 0:30	8 Dec 2008	South Gym, Oyama, Japan	
36	Win	25–8–3	(Mexico) Dolores Osorio	UD	8	29 Aug 2008	Ciudad del Carmen, Mexico	
35	Loss	24–8–3	(Puerto Rico) Iván Calderón	UD	12	18 Feb 2006	(United States) The Aladdin, Paradise, Nevada, U.S.	For WBO mini flyweight title
34	Loss	24–7–3	(Japan) Katsunari Takayama	UD	12	4 Apr 2005	Municipal Central Gymnasium, Osaka, Japan	Lost WBC mini flyweight title
33	Win	24–6–3	(Thailand) Eagle Kyowa	TKO	4 (12), 0:39	18 Dec 2004	Korakuen Hall, Tokyo, Japan	Won WBC mini flyweight title
32	Win	23–6–3	(Mexico) Javier Angeles	KO	6 (10)	14 Aug 2004	Arena Hermanos Arredondo, Apatzingán, Mexico	
31	Win	22–6–3	(Mexico) Adalberto Davila	TKO	6 (10)	20 Dec 2003	Palenque de Gallos, Cuautitlán Izcalli, Mexico	
30	Win	21–6–3	(Mexico) Mariano Rodriguez	KO	1 (10)	16 Aug 2003	Auditorio Municipal, Jiquilpan de Juárez, Mexico	
29	Win	20–6–3	(Mexico) Édgar Sosa	MD	12	3 Jul 2003	Centro de Espectaculos La Maraka, Mexico City, Mexico	Retained NABF mini flyweight title
28	Win	19–6–3	(Mexico) Ricardo San Martin	UD	12	28 Nov 2002	Foro Las Americas, Mexico City, Mexico	
27	Win	18–6–3	(Mexico) Fernando Luna Velez	TKO	1 (12)	4 May 2002	Mexico City, Mexico	Retained NABF mini flyweight title
26	Win	17–6–3	(Mexico) Valentin Leon	TKO	10 (12)	23 Feb 2002	Mexico City, Mexico	Retained NABF mini flyweight title
25	Win	16–6–3	(Mexico) Fernando Luna Velez	UD	12	8 Dec 2001	Arena Mexico, Mexico City, Mexico	Retained NABF mini flyweight title
24	Win	15–6–3	(Nicaragua) Leandro Mendoza	KO	3 (10), 0:51	13 Oct 2001	Arena Mexico, Mexico City, Mexico	
23	Win	14–6–3	(Mexico) Christian Hernandez	KO	3 (12)	18 Aug 2001	Mexico City, Mexico	Retained NABF mini flyweight title
22	Win	13–6–3	(Mexico) Valentin Leon	KO	6 (12)	28 Apr 2001	Mexico City, Mexico	Retained NABF mini flyweight title
21	Win	12–6–3	(Mexico) Valentin Romero	TKO	1 (12), 1:50	20 Jan 2001	Arena Mexico, Mexico City, Mexico	Retained NABF mini flyweight title
20	Win	11–6–3	(Mexico) Jesus Vargas	UD	12	28 Oct 2000	Arena Mexico, Mexico City, Mexico	Won vacant NABF mini flyweight title
19	Draw	10–6–3	(Mexico) Jesus Vargas	TD	2 (12)	5 Aug 2000	Arena Mexico, Mexico City, Mexico	For vacant NABF mini flyweight title
18	Win	10–6–2	(Mexico) Alfredo Virgen	UD	10	10 Jun 2000	Mexico City, Mexico	
17	Draw	9–6–2	(Mexico) Gil Portilla	PTS	10	22 Jan 2000	Auditorio Municipal, Huixquilucan de Degollado, Mexico	
16	Win	9–6–1	(Mexico) Rodrigo Garcia	KO	5 (8)	3 Jul 1999	Arena Mexico, Mexico City, Mexico	
15	Win	8–6–1	(Mexico) Victor Garcia	DQ	3 (8)	10 Apr 1999	Arena Coliseo, Mexico City, Mexico	
14	Loss	7–6–1	(Mexico) Tomás Rojas	TKO	3 (8)	24 Oct 1998	Arena México, Mexico City, Mexico	
13	Win	7–5–1	(Mexico) Juan Carlos Jacobo	DQ	1	8 Aug 1998	Mexico City, Mexico	
12	Win	6–5–1	(Mexico) Victor Manuel Rojas	PTS	6	27 Jun 1998	Mexico City, Mexico	
11	Loss	5–5–1	(Mexico) Juan Carlos Jacobo	UD	6	12 May 1998	Discoteca La Boom, Lomas de Sotelo, Mexico	
10	Loss	5–4–1	(Mexico) Felipe Mateos	PTS	6	19 Oct 1996	Mexico City, Mexico	
9	Win	5–3–1	(Mexico) Fernando Herrera	KO	3	20 Sep 1996	Mexico City, Mexico	
8	Win	4–3–1	(Mexico) Juan Javier Lagos	UD	4	16 Aug 1996	Mexico City, Mexico	
7	Loss	3–3–1	(Mexico) Juan Javier Lagos	PTS	4	8 May 1996	Mexico City, Mexico	
6	Win	3–2–1	(Mexico) Francisco Martinez	TKO	2	10 Apr 1996	Mexico	
5	Win	2–2–1	(Mexico) Antonio Leon	PTS	4	2 Dec 1995	Mexico City, Mexico	
4	Loss	1–2–1	(Mexico) Felipe Mateos	PTS	4	21 Oct 1995	Mexico City, Mexico	
3	Draw	1–1–1	(Mexico) Julio Morales	PTS	4	13 Sep 1995	Mexico City, Mexico	
2	Win	1–1	(Mexico) Arturo Leon	PTS	4	3 Jun 1995	Mexico City, Mexico	
1	Loss	0–1	(Mexico) Adrian Gonzalez	MD	4	15 Feb 1995	Mexico City, Mexico	

== See also ==
- List of WBC world champions
- List of Mexican boxing world champions

Sporting positions
Regional boxing titles
Vacant Title last held by José Antonio Aguirre	NABF mini flyweight champion October 28, 2000 – June 2004; Vacated	Vacant Title next held by Lorenzo Trejo
World boxing titles
Preceded by Eagle Kyowa	WBC mini flyweight champion December 18, 2004 – April 4, 2005	Succeeded by Katsunari Takayama
