= Oleydong Sithsamerchai =

Thai boxer

Personal information
- Nickname: The Deadly Candy ไอ้ลูกอมมรณะ
- Nationality: Thai
- Born: Kittipong Jaigrajang กิตติพงษ์ ใจกระจ่าง; July 17, 1985 (age 40) Huai Yot (now Ratsada), Thailand
- Height: 5′ 3½ in (161 cm)
- Weight: Minimumweight; Super flyweight

Boxing career
- Stance: Southpaw

Boxing record
- Total fights: 72
- Wins: 69
- Win by KO: 29
- Losses: 2
- Draws: 1

Oleydong Sithsamerchai (Thai: โอเล่ห์ดง ศักดิ์เสมอชัย; born July 17, 1985, in Tambon Ratsada, Huai Yot District (now Ratsada District), Trang Province) is a professional boxer from Thailand who has competed in the Strawweight and Super flyweight divisions. He is a former WBC Strawweight World Champion, having captured the title on November 29, 2007, by defeating Eagle Kyowa, a fellow Thai boxer based in Japan.

He became the first world champion from southern Thailand, as previous boxers from the region had challenged for world titles without success.

Sithsamerchai successfully defended his title for the third time on November 28, 2009, winning by majority decision over Juan Palacios. However, he lost the title on February 11, 2011, when he was knocked out by Kazuto Ioka.

== Other names ==
- Oleydong Kratingdaenggym (โอเล่ห์ดง กระทิงแดงยิม)
- Oleydong CP Freshmart (โอเล่ห์ดง ซีพีเฟรชมาร์ท)

== Professional boxing record ==
72 fights	69 wins	2 losses
By knockout	29	2
By decision	39	0
By disqualification	1	0
Draws	1	

No.	Result	Record	Opponent	Type	Round	Date	Location	Notes
72	Win	69–2–1	Octavio Castro	TKO	6 (6)	Oct 12, 2018	Rangsit International Stadium, Rangsit, Thailand	
71	Loss	68–2–1	Tenta Kiyose	RTD	7 (10)	Jul 21, 2018	Himeji Wing Gym, Himeji, Hyogo, Japan	
70	Win	68–1–1	Thanawat Yancharoen	UD	6	May 2, 2018	City Hall Ground, Nakhon Ratchasima, Thailand	
69	Win	67–1–1	Dong Du Tran	RTD	3 (6)	Dec 15, 2017	Siam Junction Market, Bangsue, Bangkok, Thailand	
68	Win	66–1–1	Fu Tui Nguyen	TKO	5 (6)	Jul 15, 2017	City Hall Ground, Chonburi, Thailand	
67	Win	65–1–1	Inderjit Singh	TKO	1 (6)	May 26, 2017	Ayutthaya Park, Ayutthaya, Thailand	
66	Win	64–1–1	Davidson Baisao	UD	6	Mar 1, 2017	Chonburi Provincial Ground, Chonburi, Thailand	
65	Win	63–1–1	Vladimir Lytkin	TKO	5 (6)	Jan 25, 2017	Phitsanulok Provincial Ground, Phitsanulok, Thailand	
64	Win	62–1–1	Anusorn Chaisura	PTS	6	Nov 25, 2016	Nakhon Sawan Municipality Ground, Nakhon Sawan, Thailand	
63	Win	61–1–1	Amorn Longsiriphoom	TKO	3 (6)	Sep 30, 2016	Ayutthaya Park, Ayutthaya, Thailand	
62	Win	60–1–1	Phum Kunmat	UD	6	Apr 29, 2016	City Hall Ground, Chonburi, Thailand	
61	Win	59–1–1	Boido Simanjuntak	UD	6	Feb 4, 2016	City Hall Ground, Chonburi, Thailand	
60	Win	58–1–1	Oke Haryanto	KO	1 (6)	Nov 24, 2015	City Hall Ground, Chonburi, Thailand	
59	Win	57–1–1	Pharkin Phakdeepin	KO	5 (6)	Oct 8, 2015	Siam Paradise Entertainment Centre, Ngam Wong Wan, Bangkok, Thailand	
58	Win	56–1–1	Rasmanudin	PTS	8	Mar 27, 2015	Chokchai 4 Market, Bangkok, Thailand	
57	Win	55–1–1	Falazona Fidal	KO	4 (6)	Aug 29, 2014	Siam Society Hotel and Resort, Bangkok, Thailand	
56	Win	54–1–1	Noli Morales	KO	4 (12)	May 30, 2014	Wangtai Hotel, Surat Thani, Thailand	Retained WBC International super flyweight title
55	Win	53–1–1	Noppadol Chornkratok	KO	2 (6)	Mar 28, 2014	Chokchai 4 Market, Bangkok, Thailand	
54	Win	52–1–1	Sandeep	KO	4 (6)	Jan 31, 2014	Nongplalai School, Ubon Ratchathani, Thailand	
53	Win	51–1–1	Giovanni Escaner	UD	12	Oct 31, 2013	Hat Yai, Thailand	Retained WBC International super flyweight title
52	Win	50–1–1	Sandeep	UD	6	Sep 27, 2013	Chom Thong District Office, Bangkok, Thailand	
51	Win	49–1–1	Hyobu Nakagama	DQ	6 (12)	Jul 24, 2013	Central Stadium, Phitsanulok, Thailand	Retained WBC International super flyweight title
50	Win	48–1–1	Falazona Fidal	UD	6	May 8, 2013	Piboonmangsahan, Ubon Ratchathani, Thailand	
49	Win	47–1–1	Richard Garcia	TKO	7 (12)	Mar 29, 2013	Thungsimuang, Udon Thani, Thailand	Retained WBC International super flyweight title
48	Win	46–1–1	Falazona Fidal	UD	6	Mar 13, 2013	Pratunampra-in, Wang Noi, Thailand	
47	Win	45–1–1	Danilo Pena	UD	6	Dec 28, 2012	Chom Thong District Office, Bangkok, Thailand	
46	Win	44–1–1	Hiroyuki Kudaka	UD	12	Nov 12, 2012	Central Pavilion, Sara Buri, Thailand	
45	Win	43–1–1	Alex Buckie	UD	6	Aug 31, 2012	Nakhon Si Thammarat, Thailand	
44	Win	42–1–1	Ryan Bito	TKO	8 (12)	Jul 12, 2012	City Hall, Sara Buri, Thailand	Retained WBC International super flyweight title
43	Win	41–1–1	Hayato Kimura	RTD	6 (12)	Apr 27, 2012	Nakhon Pathom, Thailand	Retained WBC International super flyweight title
42	Win	40–1–1	Lowie Bantigue	UD	6	Mar 30, 2012	Chokchai 4 Market, Bangkok, Thailand	
41	Win	39–1–1	Hyobu Nakagama	UD	12	Dec 6, 2011	Tak Fa, Thailand	Retained WBC International super flyweight title
40	Win	38–1–1	Jason Canoy	TD	7 (12)	Oct 28, 2011	City Hall Ground, Nakhon Ratchasima, Thailand	Won vacant WBC International super flyweight title
39	Win	37–1–1	Mark Anthony Geraldo	UD	12	Jul 29, 2011	Wat Sakae School, Uthai, Thailand	Won vacant WBC International Silver super flyweight title
38	Win	36–1–1	Petchprakan Manoprungroj	KO	1 (6)	Jul 1, 2011	Hat Yai, Thailand	
37	Loss	35–1–1	Kazuto Ioka	TKO	5 (12)	Feb 11, 2011	World Memorial Hall, Kobe, Hyogo, Japan	Lost WBC mini flyweight title
36	Win	35–0–1	Ricky Sharil Fabanyo	TKO	4 (6)	Dec 24, 2010	11th Inf Reg, Bangkok, Thailand	
35	Draw	34–0–1	Pornsawan Porpramook	MD	12	Sep 3, 2010	Kad Choengdoi, Chiang Mai, Thailand	Retained WBC mini flyweight title
34	Win	34–0	Yasutaka Kuroki	UD	12	Mar 27, 2010	Ariake Colosseum, Tokyo, Japan	Retained WBC mini flyweight title
33	Win	33–0	Juan Palacios	MD	12	Nov 27, 2009	Future Park Plaza, Rangsit, Thailand	Retained WBC mini flyweight title
32	Win	32–0	Adi Nukung	PTS	6	Jul 31, 2009	Sara Buri, Thailand	
31	Win	31–0	Muhammad Rachman	TD	11 (12)	May 29, 2009	Bangla Stadium, Patong, Thailand	Retained WBC mini flyweight title
30	Win	30–0	Darmea Jordana	PTS	6	Mar 27, 2009	City Hall Ground, Nakhon Ratchasima, Thailand	
29	Win	29–0	Pornsawan Porpramook	UD	12	Nov 27, 2008	Phitsanulok, Thailand	Retained WBC mini flyweight title
28	Win	28–0	John Cut Siregar	KO	4 (10)	Sep 25, 2008	Wat Pakbung, Minburi, Bangkok, Thailand	
27	Win	27–0	Junichi Ebisuoka	KO	9 (12)	Jun 18, 2008	Saphan Hin, Phuket, Thailand	Retained WBC mini flyweight title
26	Win	26–0	John Cut Siregar	TKO	4 (10)	Mar 28, 2008	Wat Bueng Thong Lang School, Bangkapi, Bangkok, Thailand	
25	Win	25–0	Eagle Kyowa	UD	12	Nov 29, 2007	Bangkok, Thailand	Won WBC mini flyweight title
24	Win	24–0	Sawangchai Sithchalermchai	TKO	9 (10)	Jul 18, 2007	Bangkok, Thailand	
23	Win	23–0	Omar Soto	SD	12	Apr 6, 2007	Tabkwang Stadium, Sara Buri, Thailand	
22	Win	22–0	Ryan Bito	UD	10	Aug 23, 2006	Nakhon Sawan, Thailand	Retained WBC Youth mini flyweight title
21	Win	21–0	Rollen Del Castillo	UD	10	Apr 28, 2006	Taikek Market, Sara Buri, Thailand	Retained WBC Youth mini flyweight title
20	Win	20–0	Tommy Terado	UD	10	Mar 17, 2006	Saraburi Train Stadium, Sara Buri, Thailand	Retained WBC Youth mini flyweight title
19	Win	19–0	Alex Aroy	UD	10	Dec 23, 2005	Rajabhak University, Petchaboon, Thailand	Retained WBC Youth mini flyweight title
18	Win	18–0	Lito Sisnorio	KO	6 (10)	Oct 28, 2005	Chokchai 4 Center, Bangkok, Thailand	Retained WBC Youth and Asian mini flyweight titles
17	Win	17–0	Chao Yang	KO	3 (12)	Aug 26, 2005	Sara Buri, Thailand	Retained WBC Youth and Asian mini flyweight titles
16	Win	16–0	Richard Garcia	UD	6	Jun 24, 2005	Por Kungpao, Pinklao Branch, Bangkok, Thailand	
15	Win	15–0	Rey Orais	KO	6 (10)	Feb 25, 2005	Pattaya Primary School, Pattaya, Thailand	Retained WBC Youth and Asian mini flyweight titles
14	Win	14–0	Robert Rubillar	UD	6	Dec 31, 2004	Por Kungpao Restaurant, Bangkok, Thailand	
13	Win	13–0	Jhay Herla	TKO	4 (10)	Oct 8, 2004	Arcadia Hilton Hotel, Phuket, Thailand	Retained WBC Youth and Asian mini flyweight titles
12	Win	12–0	Nino Suelo	UD	6	Aug 6, 2004	Phimai, Thailand	
11	Win	11–0	Cenon de Ocampo	TKO	1 (10)	Jun 25, 2004	Wapeepatum, Maha Sarakham, Thailand	Retained WBC Youth and Asian mini flyweight titles
10	Win	10–0	Edmund Velayo	UD	10	Apr 30, 2004	Nakhon Ratchasima, Thailand	Retained WBC Youth and Asian mini flyweight titles
9	Win	9–0	Philip Parcon	UD	10	Feb 20, 2004	Sukhumwit Market, Bangna, Bangkok, Thailand	Retained WBC Youth and Asian mini flyweight titles
8	Win	8–0	Federico Catubay	UD	10	Oct 24, 2003	Ratchaburi, Thailand	Retained WBC Youth and Asian mini flyweight titles
7	Win	7–0	Carlo Besares	UD	10	Jul 25, 2003	City Hall, Chaiyaphum, Thailand	Retained WBC Youth and Asian mini flyweight titles
6	Win	6–0	Isidro Lorona	UD	10	May 5, 2003	Bangkok, Thailand	Retained WBC Youth and Asian mini flyweight titles
5	Win	5–0	Rey Orais	TKO	6 (10)	Mar 14, 2003	Roi-Et, Thailand	Retained WBC Youth and Asian mini flyweight titles
4	Win	4–0	Nino Suelo	UD	10	Jan 31, 2003	Bangkok, Thailand	Retained WBC Youth and Asian mini flyweight titles
3	Win	3–0	Armando de la Cruz	UD	10	Oct 24, 2002	Bangkok, Thailand	Won vacant WBC Youth and Asian mini flyweight titles
2	Win	2–0	Solex Kiatsongrit	KO	2 (6)	Sep 27, 2002	Lumpinee Boxing Stadium, Bangkok, Thailand	
1	Win	1–0	Salatan Lookbanyai	KO	1 (6)	Sep 6, 2002	Lumpinee Boxing Stadium, Bangkok, Thailand	

== See also ==
- List of WBC world champions

Achievements
Preceded by Eagle Den Junlaphan	WBC minimumweight champion November 29, 2007 - February 11, 2011	Succeeded by Kazuto Ioka
