= Laem Tanot railway station =

Railway station in Laem Tanot, Thailand

Laem Tanot แหลมโตนด

General information
- Location: National Highway No. 4182, Laem Tanot Subdistrict, Khuan Khanun District, Phatthalung
- Coordinates: 7.8135°N 100.0473°E
- Owner: State Railway of Thailand
- Line: Southern Line
- Platforms: 1
- Tracks: 3

Other information
- Station code: โน.

Services
Preceding station	State Railway of Thailand	Following station
Ban Khon Hat towards Hua Lamphong or Krung Thep Aphiwat	Southern Line	Ban Sunthra Halt towards Su-ngai Kolok
Location

Laem Tanot railway station is a railway station located in Laem Tanot Subdistrict, Khuan Khanun District, Phatthalung. It is a class 3 railway station located 824.061 km (512.0 mi) from Thon Buri railway station.

== Train services ==
- Rapid No. 169/170 krungthep Apiwat Central Terminal - Yala - krungthep Apiwat Central Terminal
- Local No. 445/446 Chumphon-Hat Yai Junction-Chumphon
- Local No. 447/448 Surat Thani-Sungai Kolok-Surat Thani
- Local No. 451/452 Nakhon Si Thammarat-Sungai Kolok-Nakhon Si Thammarat
- Local No. 455/456 Nakhon Si Thammarat-Yala-Nakhon Si Thammarat
- Local No. 457/458 Nakhon Si Thammarat-Phatthalung-Nakhon Si Thammarat ( Terminated since 1 October 2015 )
