= Phatthalung railway station =

Railway station in Thailand

Coordinates: 7.5544°N 99.6046°E

Phatthalung พัทลุง
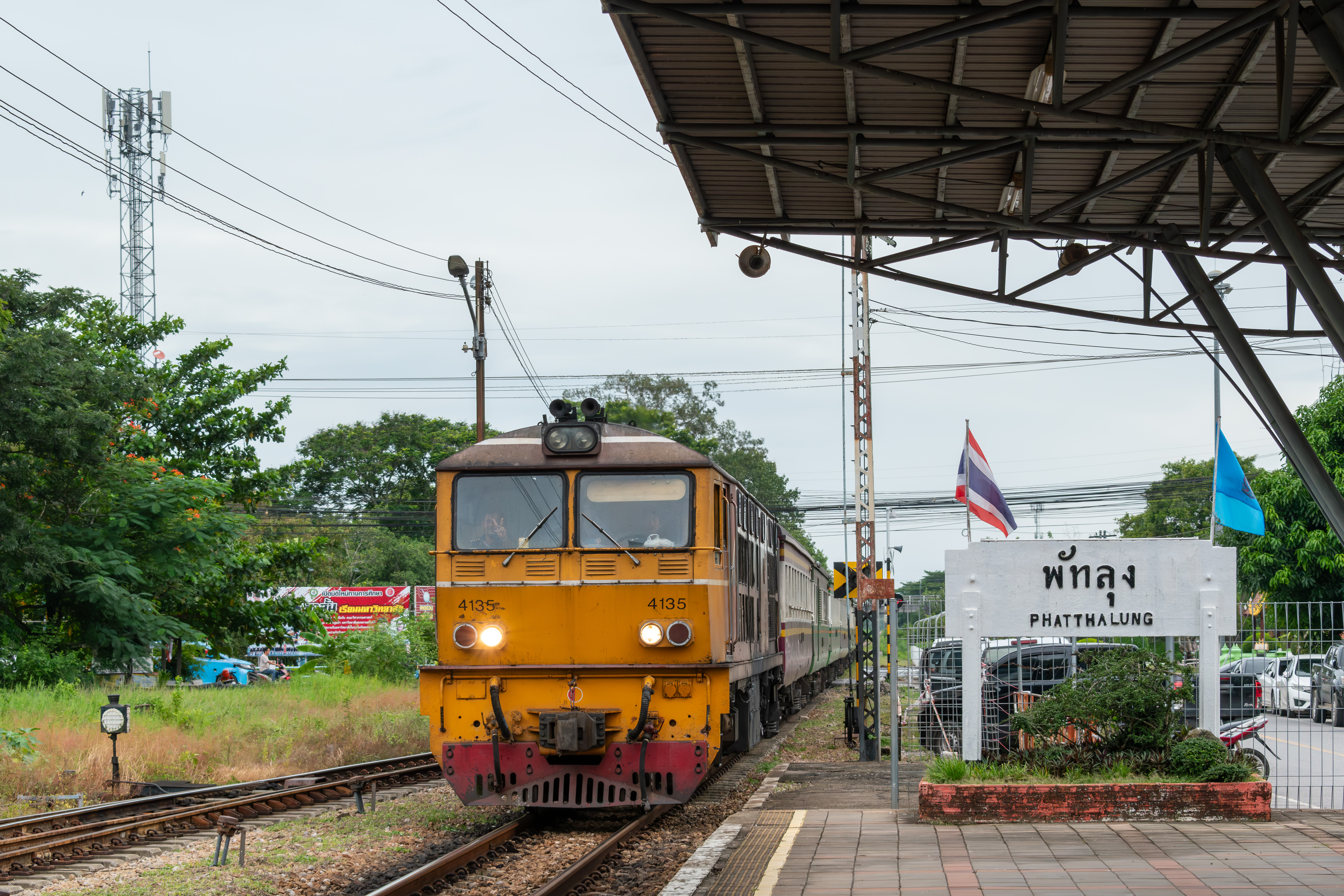

General information
- Location: Sathani Road, Khuha Sawan Subdistrict, Phatthalung City
- Owner: State Railway of Thailand
- Line: Southern Line
- Platforms: 2
- Tracks: 4

Other information
- Station code: พท.

History
- Opened: January 1913

Services
Preceding station	State Railway of Thailand	Following station
Chai Buri Halt towards Hua Lamphong or Krung Thep Aphiwat	Southern Line	Na Prue Halt towards Su-ngai Kolok
Location

Phatthalung railway station is a railway station located in Khuha Sawan Subdistrict, Phatthalung City, Phatthalung. it is a class 1 railway station, located 846.01 km (525.7 mi) from Thon Buri railway station. Phatthalung station opened in January 1913, as part of the Phatthalung-U Taphao Junction (Hat Yai) section of the Southern Line.

== 2011 Phatthalung rail accident ==
On 15 January 2011, freight train No. 722 Bang Sue Junction-Hat Yai Junction, collided with international express No. 36 Butterworth-Bangkok around the Phatthalung station area. Some bogies derailed and collided with local train No. 457 Nakhon Si Thammarat-Phatthalung, which was parked in the sidings. 4 people were injured from this incident, two passengers, one rail conductor and one railway policeman.

The cause was that the locomotive for freight train No. 722 broke down between Phatthalung Station and Pak Khlong Station, so the locomotive for international express No. 35 uncoupled with its carriages (on platform 1) and went to couple with the freight cars of No. 722, to be pulled back to Phatthalung Station. However, as the train approached (to enter platform 2), the rail switch failed and No. 722 collided with the carriages of No. 35 on platform 1. The carriages of No. 35 derailed and collided with carriages of No. 457.
