= Ban Sunthra railway halt =

Railway station in Pan Tae, Thailand

Coordinates: 7.78561°N 100.05997°E

Ban Sunthra บ้านสุนทรา

General information
- Location: Pantae Subdistrict, Khuan Khanun District, Phatthalung
- Owner: State Railway of Thailand
- Line: Southern Line
- Platforms: 1
- Tracks: 1

Other information
- Station code: บท.

Services
Preceding station	State Railway of Thailand	Following station
Laem Tanot towards Hua Lamphong or Krung Thep Aphiwat	Southern Line	Pak Khlong towards Su-ngai Kolok
Location

Ban Sunthra Halt (Thai: ที่หยุดรถบ้านสุนทรา) is a railway halt located in Pantae Subdistrict, Khuan Khanun District, Phatthalung. It is located 829.031 km (515.1 mi) from Thon Buri Railway Station.

== Train services ==
- Local No. 445/446 Chumphon-Hat Yai Junction-Chumphon
- Local No. 448 Sungai Kolok-Surat Thani
- Local No. 451/452 Nakhon Si Thammarat-Sungai Kolok-Nakhon Si Thammarat
- Local No. 455/456 Nakhon Si Thammarat-Yala-Nakhon Si Thammarat
- Local No. 457/458 Nakhon Si Thammarat-Phatthalung-Nakhon Si Thammarat (Terminated since 1 October 2015)
