= Teruo Misawa =

Japanese former professional boxer (born 1978)

Personal information
- Nationality: Japanese
- Born: 11 December 1978 (age 47) Kumagaya, Japan
- Height: 5 ft 2 in (1.57 m)
- Weight: Mini-flyweight

Boxing career
- Stance: Orthodox

Boxing record
- Total fights: 27
- Wins: 18
- Win by KO: 7
- Losses: 5
- Draws: 4

Teruo Misawa (born 11 December 1978) is a Japanese former professional boxer who competed from 1998 to 2008. He held the Japanese mini-flyweight title from 2006 to 2007 and challenged for the WBC interim mini-flyweight title in 2008.

== Professional career ==
Misawa made his debut in 1998 with a win over Yuji Kogure. In his nineteenth bout, Satoshi Kogumazaka narrowly defeated Misawa by a close unanimous decision (UD) to retain his Japanese mini-flyweight title in March 2005. After an August 2006 rematch for the now vacant title ended in a split draw (SD), Misawa finally defeated Kogumazaka to win the title by UD in December 2006. Misawa lost the title in his first defense to Yasutaka Kuroki in May 2007 by unanimous technical decision (TD). After Kuroki defeated Misawa in a rematch, WBC interim champion Juan Palacios defeated Misawa by seventh-round technical knockout (TKO) to retain his title in November 2008.

== Professional boxing record ==
27 fights	18 wins	5 losses
By knockout	7	1
By decision	11	4
Draws	4	

No.	Result	Record	Opponent	Type	Round, time	Date	Location	Notes
27	Loss	18–5–4	(Nicaragua) Juan Palacios	TKO	7 (12), 2:28	Nov 7, 2008	Sichuan Gymnasium, Chengdu, China	For WBC interim mini-flyweight title
26	Loss	18–4–4	(Japan) Yasutaka Kuroki	UD	10	Apr 2, 2008	Korakuen Hall, Tokyo, Japan	For Japanese mini-flyweight title
25	Win	18–3–4	(Thailand) Adisak Polkratok	KO	2 (10), 1:38	Oct 6, 2007	Korakuen Hall, Tokyo, Japan	
24	Loss	17–3–4	(Japan) Yasutaka Kuroki	TD	7 (10), 1:46	May 5, 2007	Korakuen Hall, Tokyo, Japan	Lost Japanese mini-flyweight title; Unanimous TD
23	Win	17–2–4	(Japan) Satoshi Kogumazaka	UD	10	Dec 16, 2006	Korakuen Hall, Tokyo, Japan	Won vacant Japanese mini-flyweight title
22	Draw	16–2–4	(Japan) Satoshi Kogumazaka	PTS	10	Aug 12, 2006	Korakuen Hall, Tokyo, Japan	For vacant Japanese mini-flyweight title
21	Win	16–2–3	(Japan) Makoto Suzuki	SD	10	Nov 8, 2005	Korakuen Hall, Tokyo, Japan	
20	Win	15–2–3	(Japan) Koki Takahashi	UD	8	Sep 3, 2005	Korakuen Hall, Tokyo, Japan	
19	Loss	14–2–3	(Japan) Satoshi Kogumazaka	UD	10	Mar 19, 2005	Korakuen Hall, Tokyo, Japan	For Japanese mini-flyweight title
18	Win	14–1–3	(Japan) Yuki Hashiguchi	UD	8	Apr 17, 2004	Korakuen Hall, Tokyo, Japan	
17	Win	13–1–3	(Japan) Hideaki Shoto	TD	6 (10)	Jan 17, 2004	Korakuen Hall, Tokyo, Japan	Unanimous TD
16	Win	12–1–3	(Japan) Kenichi Kishida	UD	8	Aug 16, 2003	Korakuen Hall, Tokyo, Japan	
15	Win	11–1–3	(Japan) Toshiki Ogawa	TKO	7 (8), 1:40	Apr 5, 2003	Korakuen Hall, Tokyo, Japan	
14	Win	10–1–3	(Japan) Hidekazu Miyagi	MD	8	Apr 5, 2002	Korakuen Hall, Tokyo, Japan	
13	Draw	9–1–3	(Japan) Hiroshi Kasamatsu	PTS	8	Dec 1, 2001	Korakuen Hall, Tokyo, Japan	
12	Win	9–1–2	(Japan) Atsuomi Maeda	PTS	8	Aug 18, 2001	Korakuen Hall, Tokyo, Japan	
11	Draw	8–1–2	(Japan) Daisuke Takahashi	TD	3 (10)	Apr 21, 2001	Tokyo, Japan	
10	Win	8–1–1	(Japan) Koji Sano	PTS	8	Feb 14, 2001	Korakuen Hall, Tokyo, Japan	
9	Draw	7–1–1	(Japan) Ichiro Yamanishi	PTS	8	Oct 21, 2000	Tokyo, Japan	
8	Win	7–1	(Mexico) Armando Torres	MD	6	Jun 17, 2000	Tokyo, Japan	
7	Win	6–1	(Japan) Shinji Miyashita	TKO	2 (6)	Mar 12, 2000	Ryōgoku Kokugikan, Tokyo, Japan	
6	Loss	5–1	(Japan) Jun Kitano	PTS	4	Sep 27, 1999	Korakuen Hall, Tokyo, Japan	
5	Win	5–0	(Japan) Yoshiatsu Arii	KO	2 (4), 1:50	Jul 23, 1999	Korakuen Hall, Tokyo, Japan	
4	Win	4–0	(Japan) Kenta Kitagawa	PTS	4	Jun 8, 1999	Korakuen Hall, Tokyo, Japan	
3	Win	3–0	(Japan) Takefumi Matsukawa	KO	1 (4)	May 7, 1999	Tokyo, Japan	
2	Win	2–0	Yoshitaka Tsushima	TKO	1 (4)	Feb 6, 1999	Korakuen Hall, Tokyo, Japan	
1	Win	1–0	Yuji Kogure	KO	2 (4)	Oct 3, 1998	Tokyo, Japan	Professional debut

Sporting positions
Regional boxing titles
Preceded by Satoshi Kogumazaka	Japanese mini-flyweight champion December 16, 2006 – May 5, 2007	Succeeded by Yasutaka Kuroki
