= José Antonio Aguirre (boxer) =

Mexican boxer (born 1975)

Personal information
- Nickname: "El Jaguar"
- Born: Jose Antonio Aguirre Balderas; 5 July 1975 (age 51) Cárdenas, Tabasco, Mexico
- Height: 1.60 m (5 ft 3 in)
- Weight: Minimumweight; Light flyweight; Flyweight; Super flyweight

Boxing career
- Reach: 66 in (168 cm)
- Stance: Orthodox

Boxing record
- Total fights: 47
- Wins: 35
- Win by KO: 21
- Losses: 11
- Draws: 1

José Antonio Aguirre Balderas (born 5 July 1975) is a Mexican former professional boxer who competed from 1995 to 2015. He held the WBC minimumweight title from 2000 to 2004.

== Professional career ==
Aguirre was born in Cárdenas, Tabasco, Mexico.

=== WBC minimumweight title ===
On February 11, 2000, Aguirre beat Wandee Singwangcha to win the WBC minimumweight title, becoming the first world champion from the state of Tabasco. He successfully defended his title seven times, before losing it to Eagle Kyowa by 12-round unanimous decision on January 10, 2004.

== Professional boxing record ==
47 fights	35 wins	11 losses
By knockout	21	4
By decision	14	7
Draws	1	

No.	Result	Record	Opponent	Type	Round, time	Date	Location	Notes
47	Loss	35–11–1	Gabriel Ramirez	SD	10	18 Sep 2015	Auditorio Pablo Colin, Cuautitlán Izcalli, Mexico	
46	Loss	35–10–1	Gilberto Keb Baas	RTD	8 (12), 3:00	26 Feb 2011	Poliforum Zamna, Mérida, Mexico	For WBC light-flyweight title
45	Win	35–9–1	Javier Marquez Clemente	KO	5 (10)	14 Aug 2010	Palacio de Los Deportes, Villahermosa, Mexico	
44	Loss	34–9–1	Humberto Pool	UD	10	29 Oct 2008	Foro Scotiabank, Mexico City, Mexico	
43	Loss	34–8–1	Víctor Zaleta	UD	10	24 May 2008	La Feria de Santa Rita, Chihuahua, Mexico	
42	Loss	34–7–1	Junichi Ebisuoka	MD	10	12 Aug 2007	City Sogo Gym, Takasago, Japan	
41	Loss	34–6–1	Ulises Solís	TKO	9 (12), 0:30	19 May 2007	Auditorio Benito Juarez, Guadalajara, Mexico	For IBF light-flyweight title
40	Win	34–5–1	Francisco Soto	SD	12	4 Aug 2006	Palenque del Hipódromo de Agua Caliente, Tijuana, Mexico	Won vacant WBA Fedecaribe light-flyweight title
39	Loss	33–5–1	Brian Viloria	UD	12	18 Feb 2006	The Aladdin, Las Vegas, Nevada, U.S.	For WBC light-flyweight title
38	Loss	33–4–1	Roberto Vásquez	TKO	4 (12), 1:16	20 Aug 2005	Figali Convention Center, Panama City, Panama	For WBA light-flyweight title
37	Loss	33–3–1	Eric Ortiz	TKO	7 (12), 2:47	11 Mar 2005	Restaurante Arroyo, Mexico City, Mexico	For vacant WBC light-flyweight title
36	Win	33–2–1	Kermin Guardia	SD	10	26 Nov 2004	Plaza Hotel & Casino, Las Vegas, Nevada, U.S.	
35	Win	32–2–1	Fred Heberto Valdez	TKO	4 (10)	21 Aug 2004	Palenque de la Expo, Ciudad Obregón, Mexico	
34	Win	31–2–1	Jorge Romero	UD	10	22 May 2004	Plaza de Toros, Mexico City, Mexico	
33	Loss	30–2–1	Eagle Kyowa	UD	12	10 Jan 2004	Korakuen Hall, Tokyo, Japan	Lost WBC mini-flyweight title
32	Win	30–1–1	Keitaro Hoshino	TKO	12 (12), 2:15	23 Jun 2003	Yokohama Arena, Yokohama, Japan	Retained WBC mini-flyweight title
31	Win	29–1–1	Juan Alfonso Keb Baas	TKO	7 (12), 2:17	22 Feb 2003	Plaza de Toros, Mexico City, Mexico	Retained WBC mini-flyweight title
30	Win	28–1–1	Juan Palacios	SD	12	19 Oct 2002	Palenque de Gallos, Villahermosa, Mexico	Retained WBC mini-flyweight title
29	Win	27–1–1	Wolf Tokimitsu	TKO	3 (12), 1:43	11 Nov 2001	Budokan, Okayama, Japan	Retained WBC mini-flyweight title
28	Win	26–1–1	Manny Melchor	UD	12	2 Feb 2001	Frontón Palacio Jai Alai, Tijuana, Mexico	Retained WBC mini-flyweight title
27	Win	25–1–1	Erdene Chuluun	KO	4 (12), 2:42	21 Oct 2000	Salon 21, Mexico City, Mexico	Retained WBC mini-flyweight title
26	Win	24–1–1	Jose Luis Zepeda	KO	5 (12), 2:50	7 Jul 2000	Palenque de Gallos, Villahermosa, Mexico	Retained WBC mini-flyweight title
25	Win	23–1–1	Wandee Singwangcha	MD	12	11 Feb 2000	Mahachai Villa Arena, Samut Sakhon, Thailand	Won WBC mini-flyweight title
24	Win	22–1–1	Juan Carlos Moreno	TKO	2 (12)	15 Nov 1999	La Boom Discoteque, Mexico City, Mexico	Retained WBC–NABF mini-flyweight title
23	Win	21–1–1	Rafael Orozco	KO	6 (12)	5 Aug 1999	Mexico City, Mexico	Retained WBC–NABF mini-flyweight title
22	Win	20–1–1	Gustavo Andrade	KO	1 (12)	3 Oct 1998	Tampico, Mexico	Retained WBC–NABF mini-flyweight title
21	Win	19–1–1	Rafael Orozco	KO	2 (12)	13 Aug 1998	Discoteca La Boom, Lomas de Sotelo, Mexico	Retained WBC–NABF mini-flyweight title
20	Win	18–1–1	Fernando Luna Velez	KO	7 (12)	20 May 1998	Acapulco, Mexico	Retained WBC–NABF mini-flyweight title
19	Win	17–1–1	Martin Acevedo	TKO	2 (12)	28 Feb 1998	Arena Coliseo, Mexico City, Mexico	Won WBC–NABF mini-flyweight title
18	Win	16–1–1	Jose Ignacio Vargas	KO	1	24 Jan 1998	Arena Coliseo, Mexico City, Mexico	
17	Win	15–1–1	Paulino Villalobos	PTS	10	6 Dec 1997	Mexico City, Mexico	
16	Win	14–1–1	Lorenzo Trejo	PTS	12	11 Oct 1997	Mexico City, Mexico	
15	Win	13–1–1	Guillermo Garcia	PTS	10	16 Aug 1997	Mexico City, Mexico	
14	Loss	12–1–1	Cruz Zamora	PTS	10	28 Jun 1997	Mexico City, Mexico	
13	Win	12–0–1	Joaquin Candelario	KO	1	22 Apr 1997	Mexico City, Mexico	
12	Win	11–0–1	Pedro Alderete	KO	6	1 Mar 1997	Villahermosa, Mexico	
11	Win	10–0–1	Joaquin Candelario	KO	6	13 Dec 1996	Villahermosa, Mexico	
10	Win	9–0–1	Victor Mariche	PTS	8	15 Nov 1996	Villahermosa, Mexico	
9	Win	8–0–1	Antonio Rojas	KO	5	13 Jul 1996	Mexico City, Mexico	
8	Draw	7–0–1	Jorge Lacierva	PTS	6	15 Mar 1996	Guadalajara, Mexico	
7	Win	7–0	Juan Alberto Sotomayor	PTS	6	10 Feb 1996	Mexico City, Mexico	
6	Win	6–0	Juan Alberto Sotomayor	PTS	6	22 Dec 1995	Tlalnepantla, Mexico	
5	Win	5–0	Juan Javier Lagos	KO	2	11 Nov 1995	Mexico City, Mexico	
4	Win	4–0	Fernando Luna Velez	KO	2	21 Jun 1995	Mexico City, Mexico	
3	Win	3–0	Julio Morales	PTS	4	17 May 1995	Mexico City, Mexico	
2	Win	2–0	Adrian Gonzalez	KO	3	5 Apr 1995	Mexico City, Mexico	
1	Win	1–0	Felipe Mateos	UD	4	15 Feb 1995	Mexico City, Mexico	

== See also ==
- List of WBC world champions
- List of Mexican boxing world champions

Achievements
Preceded by Wandee Singwancha	WBC minimumweight champion February 11, 2000–January 10, 2004	Succeeded by Eagle Den Junlaphan
