= Wandee =

Wandee is a given name. Notable people with the name include:

- Wandee Kameaim (born 1978), Thai weightlifter
- Wandee Singwangcha (born 1980), Thai boxer
