= Pak Khlong railway station =

Railway station in Makok Nuea, Thailand

Pak Khlong ปากคลอง

General information
- Location: Makok Nua Subdistrict, Khuan Khanun District, Phatthalung
- Coordinates: 7.7371°N 100.0770°E
- Owner: State Railway of Thailand
- Line: Southern Line
- Platforms: 1
- Tracks: 3

Other information
- Station code: ปค.

Services
Preceding station	State Railway of Thailand	Following station
Ban Sunthra Halt towards Hua Lamphong or Krung Thep Aphiwat	Southern Line	Ban Makok Tai Halt towards Su-ngai Kolok
Location

Pak Khlong railway station is a railway station located in Makok Nua Subdistrict, Khuan Khanun District, Phatthalung. It is a class 3 railway station located 833.118 km (517.7 mi) from Thon Buri railway station.

== Train services ==
- Rapid No.169/170 Bangkok-Yala-Bangkok
- Local No. 445/446 Chumphon-Hat Yai Junction-Chumphon
- Local No. 447/448 Surat Thani-Sungai Kolok-Surat Thani
- Local No. 451/452 Nakhon Si Thammarat-Sungai Kolok-Nakhon Si Thammarat
- Local No. 455/456 Nakhon Si Thammarat-Yala-Nakhon Si Thammarat
- Local No. 457/458 Nakhon Si Thammarat-Phatthalung-Nakhon Si Thammarat (Terminated since 1 October 2015)
