= Ban Trok Kae railway halt =

Railway station in Khon Hat, Thailand

Coordinates: 7.87306°N 100.02086°E

Ban Trok Kae บ้านตรอกแค

General information
- Location: Mu 4 (Ban Trok Kae), Khon Hat Subdistrict, Cha-uat District, Nakhon Si Thammarat
- Owner: State Railway of Thailand
- Line: Southern Line
- Platforms: 1
- Tracks: 1

Other information
- Station code: ค้.

Services
Preceding station	State Railway of Thailand	Following station
Ban Nang Long towards Hua Lamphong or Krung Thep Aphiwat	Southern Line	Ban Khon Hat towards Su-ngai Kolok
Location

Ban Trok Kae Halt (Thai: ที่หยุดรถบ้านตรอกแค) is a railway halt located in Khon Hat Subdistrict, Cha-uat District, Nakhon Si Thammarat. It is located 816.35 km (507.3 mi) from Thon Buri Railway Station.

== Train services ==
- Local No. 445/446 Chumphon-Hat Yai Junction-Chumphon
- Local No. 447/448 Surat Thani-Sungai Kolok-Surat Thani
- Local No. 451/452 Nakhon Si Thammarat-Sungai Kolok-Nakhon Si Thammarat
- Local No. 457/458 Nakhon Si Thammarat-Phatthalung-Nakhon Si Thammarat
