= Eagle Kyowa =

Thai boxer (born 1978)

Eagle Kyowa อีเกิ้ล อากากูร่า
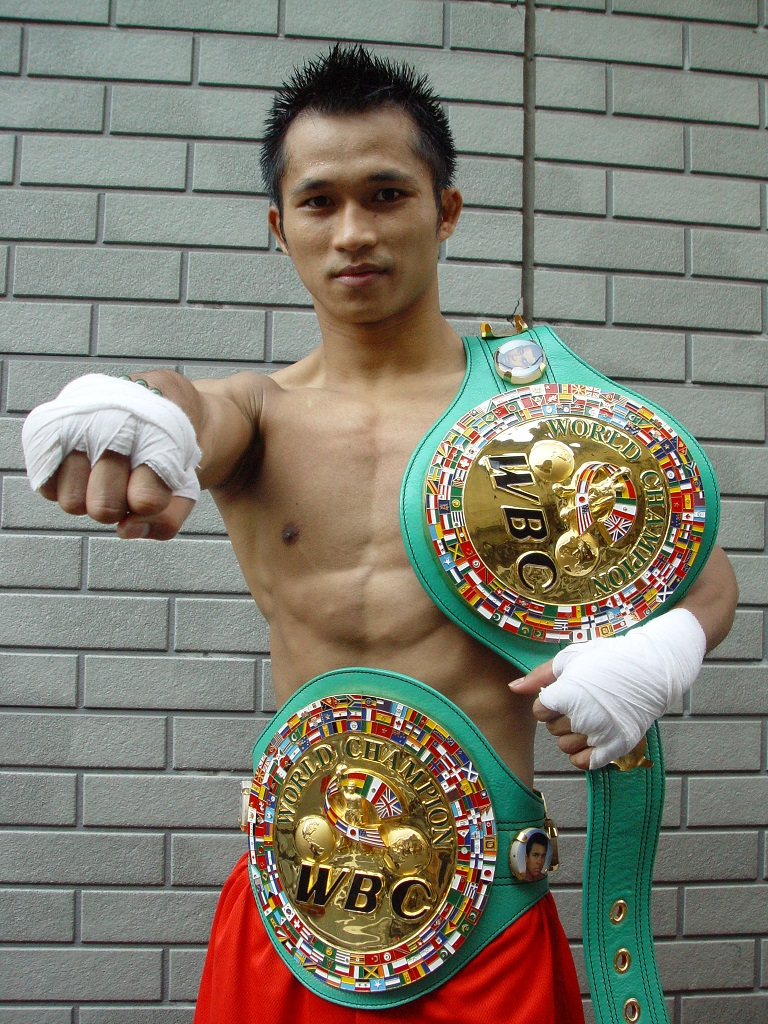

Personal information
- Nickname: Eagle Akakura
- Nationality: Thai
- Born: Den Junlaphan เด่น จุลพันธ์ December 4, 1978 (age 47) Bang Mun Nak District, Phichit Province, Thailand
- Height: 1.61 m (5 ft 3 in)
- Weight: Mini-flyweight

Boxing career
- Reach: 157 cm (62 in)
- Stance: Orthodox

Boxing record
- Total fights: 20
- Wins: 18
- Win by KO: 6
- Losses: 2

Den Junlaphan (Thai: เด่น จุลพันธ์; born December 4, 1978), better known as Eagle Kyowa, is a Thai former professional boxer who competed from 2000 to 2007. He held the WBC strawweight title twice between 2004 and 2007.

== Biography ==
Den Janlaphan was born as the eight of nine children in Phichit, Thailand. He entered Thammasat University at the age of 16, and began boxing, making his amateur debut in 1995. He turned pro, and made his professional debut in January, 2000, in Bangkok, Thailand. He transferred to the Kadoebi Houseki Gym in Tokyo, Japan, and made his Japanese debut in August, 2001 as "Eagle Okuda", winning by first-round knockout.

He won the WBC Minimumweight title in January, 2004, beating Jose Antonio Aguirre by decision. He made his first defense in May of the same year, but lost his second defense in December, 2004 against Isaac Bustos. The fight was stopped in the 4th round due to a shoulder injury by Kyowa. He made his return in August, 2005, against Katsunari Takayama, who had beaten Bustos to win the WBC Minimumweight title. Kyowa won by decision, regaining his title.

On January 9, 2006, he defeated Ken Nakajima (14–2–0) by 7th round tko. On May 6, 2006, he defeated future light flyweight champion Rodel Mayol (22-0) by a 12-round unanimous decision. In his next bout, he almost lost his title to journeyman Lorenzo Trejo in November, 2006. Kyowa dropped Trejo in the 3rd round, but was knocked down twice in the 6th. All three judges awarded Kyowa the decision by one point, and Kyowa won a close third title defense (fourth total).

He met Akira Yaegashi, the WBC's 6th ranked contender, on June 4, 2007, in Yokohama, Japan, for his fourth defense (fifth total). Kyowa dominated the young challenger from the first round to make his fourth straight defense by unanimous decision. He lost a point for an accidental head-butt in the 2nd round, but knocked down Yaegashi in the 10th round to secure his victory. All three judges awarded him the win by over ten points. This fight also utilized the open scoring approved by the World Boxing Council. Every four rounds, they would announce the official scoring of the fight. The Japan Boxing Commission is one of the few organizations that has used the WBC's open scoring feature thus far.

On November 29, 2007, Kyowa lost his title to fellow Thai boxer Oleydong Sithsamerchai (24–0–0) by unanimous decision.

== See also ==
- List of WBC world champions
- List of Japanese boxing world champions
- Boxing in Japan

== Professional boxing record ==
20 fights	18 wins	2 losses
By knockout	6	1
By decision	12	1

No.	Result	Record	Opponent	Type	Round, time	Date	Location	Notes
20	Loss	18–2	Oleydong Sithsamerchai	UD	12	Nov 29, 2007	Bangkok, Thailand	Lost WBC strawweight title
19	Win	18–1	Akira Yaegashi	UD	12	Jun 4, 2007	Pacifico Yokohama, Yokohama, Japan	Retained WBC strawweight title
18	Win	17–1	Lorenzo Trejo	UD	12	Nov 13, 2006	Nippon Budokan, Tokyo, Japan	Retained WBC strawweight title
17	Win	16–1	Rodel Mayol	UD	12	May 6, 2006	Korakuen Hall, Tokyo, Japan	Retained WBC strawweight title
16	Win	15–1	Ken Nakajima	TKO	7 (12), 1:01	Jan 9, 2006	Pacifico Yokohama, Yokohama, Japan	Retained WBC strawweight title
15	Win	14–1	Katsunari Takayama	UD	12	Aug 6, 2005	Korakuen Hall, Tokyo, Japan	Won WBC strawweight title
14	Loss	13–1	Isaac Bustos	TKO	4 (12), 0:39	Dec 18, 2004	Korakuen Hall, Tokyo, Japan	Lost WBC strawweight title
13	Win	13–0	Satoshi Kogumazaka	TD	8 (12), 2:24	Jun 28, 2004	Yokohama Arena, Yokohama, Japan	Retained WBC strawweight title
12	Win	12–0	José Antonio Aguirre	UD	12	Jan 10, 2004	Korakuen Hall, Tokyo, Japan	Won WBC strawweight title
11	Win	11–0	Elmer Gejon	UD	8	Jun 7, 2003	Korakuen Hall, Tokyo, Japan	
10	Win	10–0	Fabio Marfa	RTD	8 (10), 3:00	Feb 10, 2003	Korakuen Hall, Tokyo, Japan	
9	Win	9–0	Noel Tunacao	UD	10	Aug 26, 2002	Saitama Super Arena, Saitama City, Japan	
8	Win	8–0	Jang Min-Soo	UD	10	Jun 1, 2002	Korakuen Hall, Tokyo, Japan	
7	Win	7–0	Nico Thomas	KO	3 (8), 0:56	Jan 5, 2002	Korakuen Hall, Tokyo, Japan	
6	Win	6–0	Tsutomu Oshigane	KO	1 (6), 2:30	Aug 4, 2001	Korakuen Hall, Tokyo, Japan	
5	Win	5–0	Namchai Ratanachaigym	PTS	10	Mar 24, 2001	Bangkok, Thailand	
4	Win	4–0	Phises Vor Surapol	PTS	6	Jun 21, 2000	Bangkok, Thailand	
3	Win	3–0	Prabpram Porpreecha	PTS	6	Mar 15, 2000	Bangkok, Thailand	
2	Win	2–0	Somsri Worwutnan	KO	4 (6)	Feb 16, 2000	Bangkok, Thailand	
1	Win	1–0	Saming Porkungpaorachada	KO	2 (6)	Jan 19, 2000	Bangkok, Thailand	

Achievements
Preceded by José Antonio Aguirre	WBC Minimumweight Champion; January 10, 2004 – December 18, 2004	Succeeded by Isaac Bustos
Preceded by Katsunari Takayama	WBC Minimumweight Champion; August 6, 2005 – November 29, 2007	Succeeded by Oleydong Sithsamerchai
