= Chai Buri railway halt =

Railway halt in Chai Buri, Thailand

Chai Buri ชัยบุรี

General information
- Location: Chai Buri Subdistrict, Phatthalung City
- Owner: State Railway of Thailand
- Line: Southern Line
- Platforms: 1
- Tracks: 1

Other information
- Station code: ไช.

Services
Preceding station	State Railway of Thailand	Following station
Ban Makok Tai Halt towards Hua Lamphong or Krung Thep Aphiwat	Southern Line	Phatthalung towards Su-ngai Kolok
Location

Chai Buri Halt (Thai: ที่หยุดรถชัยบุรี) is a railway halt located in Chai Buri Subdistrict, Phatthalung City, Phatthalung. It is located 839.971 km (521.9 mi) from Thon Buri Railway Station.

== Train services ==
- Local No. 445/446 Chumphon-Hat Yai Junction-Chumphon
- Local No. 448 Sungai Kolok-Surat Thani
- Local No. 451/452 Nakhon Si Thammarat-Sungai Kolok-Nakhon Si Thammarat
- Local No. 455/456 Nakhon Si Thammarat-Yala-Nakhon Si Thammarat
- Local No. 457 Nakhon Si Thammarat-Phatthalung (Terminated since 1 October 2015)
