= Pa Phayom district =

Pa Phayom ป่าพะยอม
- District
- District location in Phatthalung province
- Coordinates: 7°50′24″N 99°55′6″E
- Country: Thailand
- Province: Phatthalung
- Seat: Pa Phayom

Area
  - Total: 386.4 km^{2} (149.2 sq mi)

Population (2005)
  - Total: 32,280
  - Density: 83.5/km^{2} (216/sq mi)
- Time zone: UTC+7 (ICT)
- Postal code: 93210
- Geocode: 9310

Pa Phayom (Thai: ป่าพะยอม, pronounced [pàː pʰā.jɔ̄ːm]) is the northernmost district (amphoe) of Phatthalung province, southern Thailand.

== Geography ==
Neighbouring districts are (from the southeast clockwise) Khuan Khanun, Si Banphot of Phattalung Province, Huai Yot of Trang province and Cha-uat of Nakhon Si Thammarat province.

== History ==
The minor district (king amphoe) was established on 19 January 1990, when four tambons were split off from Khuan Khanun district. It was upgraded to a full district on 7 September 1995.

== Administration ==
The district is divided into four sub-districts (tambons), which are further subdivided into 39 villages (mubans). There are no municipal (thesabans). There are four tambon administrative organizations (TAO).

No.	Name	Thai name	Villages	Pop.
1.	Pa Phayom	ป่าพะยอม	7	5,764
2.	Lan Khoi	ลานข่อย	9	7,594
3.	Ko Tao	เกาะเต่า	13	11,281
4.	Ban Phrao	บ้านพร้าว	10	7,641
