= Ban Makok Tai railway halt =

Railway station in Chai Buri, Thailand

Coordinates: 7.71267°N 100.07842°E

Ban Makok Tai บ้านมะกอกใต้

General information
- Location: Mu 3 (Ban Makok Tai), Chai Buri Subdistrict, Phatthalung City
- Owner: State Railway of Thailand
- Line: Southern Line
- Platforms: 1
- Tracks: 1

Other information
- Station code: บใ.

Services
Preceding station	State Railway of Thailand	Following station
Pak Khlong towards Hua Lamphong or Krung Thep Aphiwat	Southern Line	Chai Buri Halt towards Su-ngai Kolok
Location

Ban Makok Tai Halt (Thai: ที่หยุดรถบ้านมะกอกใต้) is a railway halt located in Chai Buri Subdistrict, Phatthalung City, Phatthalung. It is located 837.061 km (520.1 mi) from Thon Buri Railway Station.

== Train services ==
- Local No. 445/446 Chumphon-Hat Yai Junction-Chumphon
- Local No. 448 Sungai Kolok-Surat Thani
- Local No. 451/452 Nakhon Si Thammarat-Sungai Kolok-Nakhon Si Thammarat
- Local No. 455/456 Nakhon Si Thammarat-Yala-Nakhon Si Thammarat
- Local No. 457/458 Nakhon Si Thammarat-Phatthalung-Nakhon Si Thammarat (Terminated since 1 October 2015)
