= Juan Palacios (boxer) =

Nicaraguan boxer

Personal information
- Nickname: El Exterminador
- Born: Juan Ramon Palacios Perez; August 31, 1980 (age 45) Managua, Nicaragua
- Weight: minimumweight

Boxing career
- Stance: orthodox

Boxing record
- Total fights: 43
- Wins: 29
- Win by KO: 22
- Losses: 11
- Draws: 2
- No contests: 1

Juan Palacios (born August 31, 1980) is a boxer from Managua, Nicaragua, with a professional record of 29 wins and 9 losses. He is the former WBC Interim Minimumweight Champion, winning the vacant title against Omar Soto of Puerto Rico on August 2, 2008, in Ponce, Puerto Rico. On November 27, 2009, he lost his title in a unification match against WBC Champion Oleydong Sithsamerchai.

== Professional boxing record ==
43 fights	29 wins	11 losses
By knockout	22	5
By decision	7	6
Draws	2	
No contests	1	

No.	Result	Record	Opponent	Type	Round, time	Date	Location	Notes
43	Loss	29–11–2 (1)	Ariel Lopez	TKO	4 (8), 2:11	20 Feb 2021	Escape Ballroom, Greenville, South Carolina, U.S.	
42	Loss	29–10–2 (1)	Alexis Zazueta	TKO	1 (6), 2:23	21 Feb 2020	Celebrity Theatre, Phoenix, Arizona, U.S.	
41	Loss	29–9–2 (1)	Alexandru Marin	TKO	2 (8), 2:21	12 Aug 2017	Masonic Temple, Norfolk, Virginia, U.S.	
40	Loss	29–8–2 (1)	Carlos Castro	UD	8	22 Apr 2017	Celebrity Theatre, Phoenix, Arizona, U.S.	
39	Loss	29–7–2 (1)	Jose Martinez	TKO	1 (8), 2:46	6 Aug 2016	Coliseo Cosme Beitia Salamo, Cataño, Puerto Rico	
38	Loss	29–6–2 (1)	Jose Cordero	MD	8	31 Oct 2015	Gimnasio Rosendo Álvarez, Managua, Nicaragua	
37	Loss	29–5–2 (1)	Alexander Taylor	UD	8	17 Jul 2015	Centro Recreativo Edgardo Corea, Nagarote, Nicaragua	
36	Draw	29–4–2 (1)	Alcides Martinez	SD	8	23 May 2015	Gimnasio Alexis Argüello, Managua, Nicaragua	
35	Loss	29–4–1 (1)	Guillermo Ortiz	UD	8	21 Mar 2015	Escuela de Danza, Managua, Nicaragua	
34	Draw	29–3–1 (1)	Nerys Espinoza	SD	8	26 May 2012	Polideportivo Espana, Managua, Nicaragua	
33	Win	29–3 (1)	Armando Torres	TKO	9 (12), 1:59	13 Aug 2011	Centro Internacional Acapulco, Acapulco, Mexico	Retained WBA interim minimumweight title
32	Win	28–3 (1)	Sammy Gutiérrez	UD	12	21 May 2011	San Martín Texmelucan, Mexico	Won WBA interim minimumweight title
31	Win	27–3 (1)	Luis Carlos Leon	UD	11	25 Nov 2010	Pharaoh's Casino, Managua, Nicaragua	Won vacant WBA Fedelatin minimumweight title
30	Loss	26–3 (1)	Oleydong Sithsamerchai	MD	12	27 Nov 2009	Future Park Rangsit, Rangsit, Thailand	For WBC minimumweight title
29	Win	26–2 (1)	Erik Ramirez	TKO	10 (12)	13 Jun 2009	Centro Banamex, Mexico City, Mexico	Retained WBC interim minimumweight title
28	Win	25–2 (1)	Teruo Misawa	TKO	7 (12), 2:28	7 Nov 2008	Sichuan Gymnasium, Chengdu, China	Retained WBC interim minimumweight title
27	Win	24–2 (1)	Omar Soto	TKO	10 (12), 1:13	2 Aug 2008	Auditorio Juan Pachín Vicéns, Ponce, Puerto Rico	Won vacant WBC interim minimumweight title
26	Win	23–2 (1)	Giovany Rayo	KO	2 (8)	26 May 2007	Gimnasio Alexis Argüello, Managua, Nicaragua	
25	Win	22–2 (1)	David Salablanca	KO	3 (8), 2:47	31 Mar 2007	Gimnasio Alexis Argüello, Managua, Nicaragua	
24	Win	21–2 (1)	Gabriel Ramirez	UD	10	29 Jul 2006	Gimnasio Alexis Argüello, Managua, Nicaragua	
23	Win	20–2 (1)	Ganigan López	UD	10	18 Mar 2006	Hotel Plaza Maya, Managua, Nicaragua	
22	Win	19–2 (1)	Ezequiel Aguirre	TKO	8 (10), 2:29	10 Dec 2005	Gran Casino Rodeo, Tipitapa, Nicaragua	
21	Win	18–2 (1)	Christian Gomez	KO	3 (10), 2:37	29 Oct 2005	Casino Las Vegas, Managua, Nicaragua	
20	Win	17–2 (1)	Francisco Meza	TKO	1 (10)	2 Sep 2005	Casino Las Vegas, Managua, Nicaragua	
19	Win	16–2 (1)	Erick Aguilera	KO	5 (10)	30 Dec 2004	Esso-Rubenia Parqueo, Managua, Nicaragua	
18	Win	15–2 (1)	Juan Alvarez	KO	3 (10)	30 Oct 2004	Holiday Inn Hotel, Managua, Nicaragua	
17	Win	14–2 (1)	Ezequiel Aguirre	UD	10	31 Jul 2004	Casino Las Vegas, Managua, Nicaragua	
16	Win	13–2 (1)	Genaro Aguirre	TKO	5 (10)	17 Oct 2003	Casino Las Vegas, Managua, Nicaragua	
15	Win	12–2 (1)	Jose Martinez	TKO	6 (10)	22 May 2003	Holiday Inn Hotel, Managua, Nicaragua	
14	Loss	11–2 (1)	José Antonio Aguirre	SD	12	19 Oct 2002	Palenque de Gallos, Villahermosa, Mexico	For WBC minimumweight title
13	Win	11–1 (1)	Oscar Murillo	UD	12	25 May 2002	Gimnasio Alexis Argüello, Managua, Nicaragua	Won vacant WBC Latino light flyweight title
12	Win	10–1 (1)	Pedro Blandon	KO	4 (8)	27 Oct 2001	Managua, Nicaragua	
11	Win	9–1 (1)	Nerys Espinoza	KO	7 (10)	13 Sep 2001	Gimnasio Alexis Argüello, Managua, Nicaragua	
10	Win	8–1 (1)	Pedro Blandon	KO	4 (8)	25 May 2001	Gimnasio Alexis Argüello, Managua, Nicaragua	
9	Win	7–1 (1)	Benito Rojas	TKO	3 (8)	24 Feb 2001	Gimnasio Alexis Argüello, Managua, Nicaragua	
8	NC	6–1 (1)	Luis Sandoval	NC	3 (10)	8 Dec 2000	Hotel Intercontinental, Managua, Nicaragua	
7	Win	6–1	Carlos Fajardo	UD	10	5 Aug 2000	Gimnasio Alexis Argüello, Managua, Nicaragua	
6	Win	5–1	Vidal Cerna	KO	8 (12), 2:33	11 Mar 2000	Gimnasio Polideportivo Espana, Managua, Nicaragua	Won vacant Nicaraguan minimumweight title
5	Loss	4–1	Ernesto Castro	RTD	8 (12), 3:00	9 Oct 1999	Gimnasio Alexis Argüello, Managua, Nicaragua	For vacant WBA Fedecentro minimumweight title
4	Win	4–0	Roger Gonzalez	KO	1 (8)	24 Jul 1999	Gimnasio Alexis Argüello, Managua, Nicaragua	
3	Win	3–0	Raul Flores	KO	1 (6)	15 May 1999	Gimnasio Alexis Argüello, Managua, Nicaragua	
2	Win	2–0	Ricardo Zavala	KO	1 (6)	24 Apr 1999	San José, Costa Rica	
1	Win	1–0	Benito Rojas	TKO	5 (6)	27 Feb 1999	Gimnasio La Salle, Managua, Nicaragua	

Achievements
Vacant Title last held by Wandee Singwangcha	WBC minimumweight champion Interim title August 2, 2008 – November 27, 2009; Lost bid for full title	Vacant
Preceded by Sammy Gutiérrez	WBA minimumweight champion Interim title May 21, 2011 – August 12, 2011; Stripped (title lost on the scales)	Vacant Title next held by Paipharob Kokietgym
