= Ratsada district =

Ratsada รัษฎา
- District
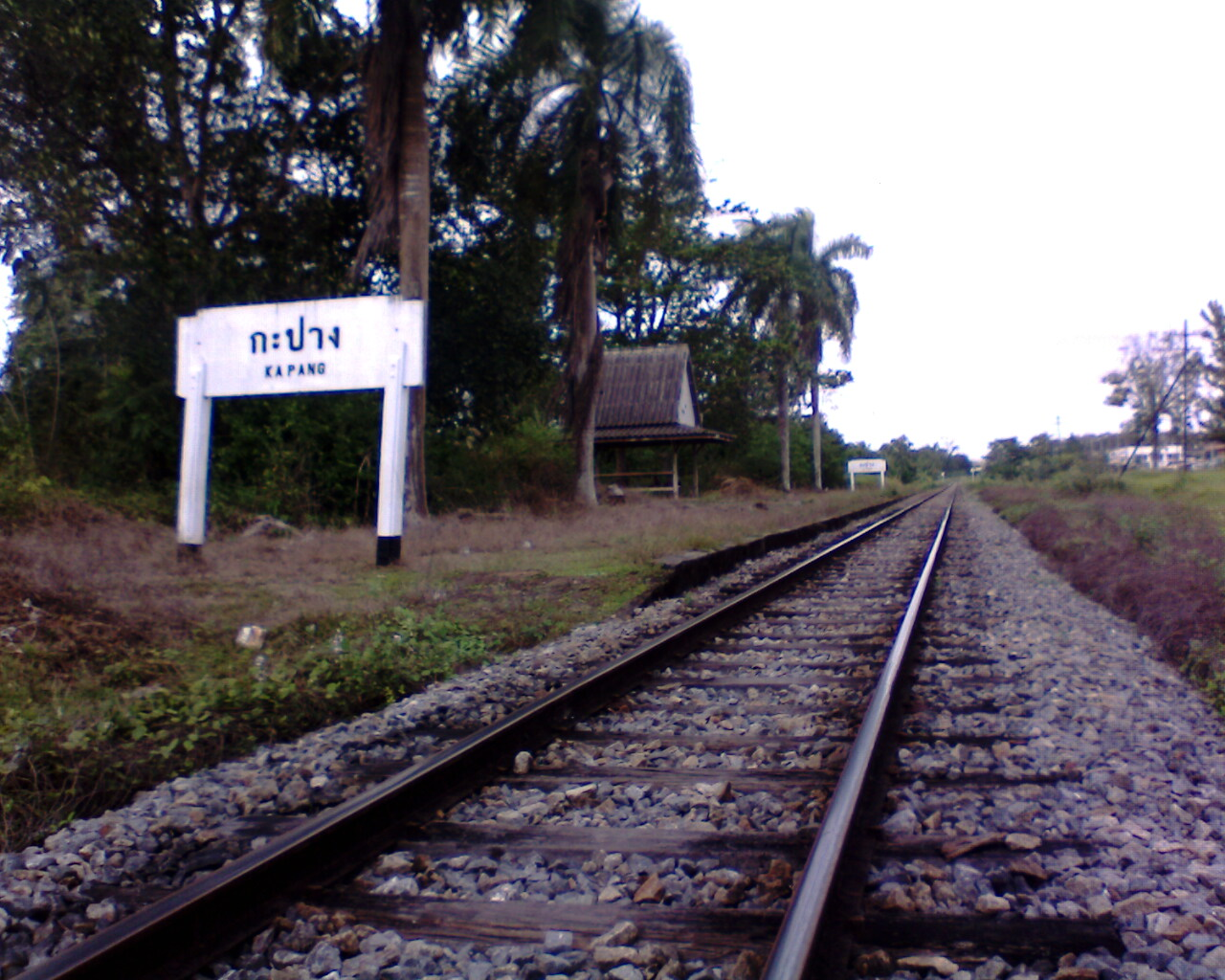
- Kapang railway halt

- District location in Trang province
- Coordinates: 7°58′30″N 99°38′0″E
- Country: Thailand
- Province: Trang
- Seat: Khlong Pang

Area
  - Total: 232.4 km^{2} (89.7 sq mi)

Population (2005)
  - Total: 26,381
  - Density: 113.5/km^{2} (294/sq mi)
- Time zone: UTC+7 (ICT)
- Postal code: 92160
- Geocode: 9209

Ratsada (Thai: รัษฎา, pronounced [rát.sā.dāː]) is a district (amphoe) in the northeastern part of Trang province, Thailand.

== History ==
The minor district (king amphoe) Ratsada was established on 1 April 1991 by splitting off five tambons from Huai Yot district. It was upgraded to a full district on 5 December 1996.

== Geography ==
Neighboring districts are (from the south clockwise): Huai Yot of Trang Province; Bang Khan and Thung Song of Nakhon Si Thammarat province.

== Administration ==
The district is divided into five sub-districts (tambons), which are further subdivided into 50 villages (mubans). Khlong Pang is a township (thesaban tambon) which covers parts of tambon Khlong Pang. There are a further five tambon administrative organizations (TAO).

No.	Name	Thai name	Villages	Pop.
1.	Khuan Mao	ควนเมา	15	6,373
2.	Khlong Pang	คลองปาง	9	5,683
3.	Nong Bua	หนองบัว	9	4,737
4.	Nong Prue	หนองปรือ	12	7,057
5.	Khao Phrai	เขาไพร	5	2,531

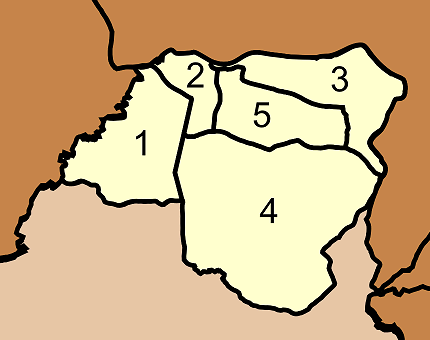

== Notable people ==
- Oleydong Sithsamerchai: professional boxer
