= Ban Khon Hat railway station =

Railway station in Thailand

Ban Khon Hat บ้านขอนหาด

General information
- Location: Mu 1 (Ban Khon Hat), Khon Hat Subdistrict, Cha-uat District, Nakhon Si Thammarat
- Coordinates: 7.8551°N 100.0287°E
- Owner: State Railway of Thailand
- Line: Southern Line
- Platforms: 1
- Tracks: 2

Other information
- Station code: ขห.

Services
Preceding station	State Railway of Thailand	Following station
Ban Trok Kae Halt towards Hua Lamphong or Krung Thep Aphiwat	Southern Line	Laem Tanot towards Su-ngai Kolok
Location

Ban Khon Hat station (Thai: สถานีบ้านขอนหาด) is a railway station located in Khon Hat Subdistrict, Cha-uat District, Nakhon Si Thammarat. It is a class 3 railway station located 818.957 km (508.9 mi) from Thon Buri railway station

== Train services ==
- Local No. 445/446 Chumphon-Hat Yai Junction-Chumphon
- Local No. 447/448 Surat Thani-Sungai Kolok-Surat Thani
- Local No. 451/452 Nakhon Si Thammarat-Sungai Kolok-Nakhon Si Thammarat
- Local No. 455/456 Nakhon Si Thammarat-Yala-Nakhon Si Thammarat
- Local No. 457/458 Nakhon Si Thammarat-Phatthalung-Nakhon Si Thammarat
