= Wandee Singwangcha =

Thai boxer

Wandee Singwancha
Personal information
- Nationality: Thai
- Born: On Doowiset; February 5, 1980 (age 46) Udon Thani, Thailand
- Height: 5 ft 2 in (157 cm)
- Weight: minimumweight light flyweight flyweight super flyweight

Boxing career
- Stance: Orthodox

Boxing record
- Total fights: 85
- Wins: 67
- Win by KO: 18
- Losses: 17
- Draws: 1
- No contests: 0

Wandee Singwancha or Wandee Chareon (Thai: วันดี สิงห์วังชา, วันดี จ.เจริญ; born On Doowiset (อ้อน ดูวิเศษ) on February 5, 1980 in Nong Han District, Udon Thani Province, Thailand) is a former professional boxer. His record is 67–17–1 (18 KOs). He is a former WBC minimumweight and WBC interim light-flyweight champion.

== Professional boxing career ==
He won the vacant interim minimumweight world title by defeating the Tokyo-based Taiwanese boxer Rocky Lin at Yokohama Arena, Yokohama, Japan on 23 August 1998. He was then promoted to full champion on 28 September 1999. He then lost the title on 11 February 2000 to José Antonio Aguirre in what was his first defence.

== Personal life ==
His uncle, Wanwin Chor Charoen, was a former challenger for the WBF mini-flyweight title at Samutprakarn Crocodile Farm and Zoo in 1994, the first WBF event in Thailand.

== Professional boxing record ==
85 fights	67 wins	17 losses
By knockout	18	9
By decision	48	8
By disqualification	1	0
Draws	1	

No.	Result	Record	Opponent	Type	Round, Time	Date	Location	Notes
85	Loss	67–17–1	Rex Tso	TKO	4 (12) 1:04	28 May 2013	Convention Towers and Exhibition Center, Hong Kong, S.A.R., China	For WBC Asian Continental Super-flyweight title
84	Loss	67–16–1	Shinichiro Morikawa	UD	8	10 Mar 2013	Sambo Hall, Kobe, Japan	
83	Loss	67–15–1	Yushi Tanaka	KO	6 (8) 3:04	18 Nov 2012	Nagoya Internayional Conference Hall, Nagoya, Japan	
82	Win	67–14–1	Truperjames Sithdajin	KO	2 (6)	14 Jan 2012	Singmanassak Muaythai School, Panthum Thani, Thailand	
81	Loss	66–14–1	Yohei Tobe	KO	2 (6) 1:58	13 Jun 2011	Korakuen Hall, Tokyo, Japan	
80	Loss	66–13–1	Petchbarngborn Kokietgym	TD	8 (12) 1:52	12 May 2011	Ko Samui, Thailand	For vacant WBC Asian Continental super-flyweight title
79	Win	66–12–1	Fahsathan Sithyodmongkol	TKO	1 (6) 1:30	11 Apr 2011	Pone Kingpetch Memorial Park, Hua Hin, Thailand	
78	Win	65–12–1	Lamnamkorn Kwanjaisrikod	DQ	1 (6)	13 Feb 2011	Koh Lanta, Krabi, Thailand	
77	Win	64–12–1	Jemmy Gobel	TKO	3 (6) 0:44	14 Nov 2010	Phimai, Thailand	
76	Loss	63–12–1	Sylvester Lopez	TKO	2 (12) 2:10	31 Jul 2010	Yñares Sports Arena, Pasig City, Philippines	For WBC International super-flyweight title
75	Win	63–11–1	Alek	TKO	1 (6)	13 Jun 2010	Aranyaphratet, Thailand	
74	Win	62–11–1	Alwi Alhabsyi	TKO	4 (6)	12 Mar 2010	Stadium of Kanuworaluckburi District, Kamphaeng Phet, Thailand	
73	Win	61–11–1	Rino Ukru	TKO	2 (6)	22 Jan 2010	Pakchong, Thailand	
72	Win	60–11–1	Edwin Tumbaga	UD	6	15 Nov 2009	Aswindam Stadium, Ram Indra, Bangkok, Thailand	
71	Win	59–11–1	Joel Rafols	UD	6	5 Oct 2009	Ban Rai School, Nakhon Ratchasima, Thailand	
70	Win	58–11–1	Brix Ray	UD	12	12 Aug 2009	Muang Temple, Bangkae, Bangkok, Thailand	Won vacant WBO Asia Pacific flyweight title
69	Loss	57–11–1	Marvin Sonsona	TKO	2 (12) 1:59	28 May 2009	Cebu Coliseum, Cebu City, Philippines	For vacant WBO Oriental flyweight title
68	Loss	57–10–1	Daiki Kameda	KO	6 (10) 0:27	4 Mar 2009	Super Arena Saitama, Saitama, Japan	
67	Win	57–9–1	Nino Suelo	UD	6	22 Oct 2008	Sukhothai Thammathirat University, Muang Thong Thani, Thailand	
66	Loss	56–9–1	Takahisa Masuda	UD	10	11 Aug 2008	Korakuen Hall, Tokyo, Japan	
65	Win	56–8–1	Roland Latuni	KO	4 (12) 2:40	29 May 2008	Suanlum Night Bazar, Bangkok, Thailand	Won vacant WBC Asian flyweight title
64	Win	55–8–1	Dan Nafsadan	UD	6	31 Mar 2008	Hua Mark Indoor Stadium, Bangkok, Thailand	
63	Win	54–8–1	Fernando Lumacad	UD	12	19 Nov 2007	The Mall Shopping Center Ngamwongwan, Bangkok, Thailand	Won vacant WBC Asian flyweight title
62	Win	53–8–1	Philip Parcon	UD	6	22 Aug 2007	Laksi Plaza, Bangkok, Thailand	
61	Win	52–8–1	Nauldy Falazona	PTS	6	21 Jun 2007	Ladprabang, Bangkok, Thailand	
60	Win	51–8–1	Jang Peng Gai	KO	2 (6)	11 Apr 2007	Sisa Chorake Yai, Thailand	
59	Win	50–8–1	Marti Polii	TKO	3 (6) 2:13	22 Dec 2006	Dhurakij Pundit University, Bangkok, Thailand	
58	Win	49–8–1	Munetsugu Kayo	UD	12	9 Oct 2006	Korakuen Hall, Tokyo, Japan	Wandee does not make the 108lb weight and is stripped of the WBC interim light-flyweight title
57	Win	48–8–1	Juanito Rubillar	UD	12	18 Jul 2006	The Mall Shopping Center, Bangkapi, Bangkok, Thailand	Won WBC interim light-flyweight title
56	Win	47–8–1	Kenichi Onishi	UD	6	10 Mar 2006	Rachabhak University, Petchaburi, Thailand	
55	Win	46–8–1	Gui Yao Bo	UD	6	21 Dec 2005	Bangkhuntien, Bangkok, Thailand	
54	Win	45–8–1	Mario Jun de Asis	UD	6	28 Sep 2005	The Mall Shopping Center, Bangkok, Thailand	
53	Win	44–8–1	Jhay Herla	UD	6	5 Jul 2005	Mueang Thong Thani Stadium, Muang Thong Thani, Thailand	
52	Win	43–8–1	Jojo Bardon	UD	6	8 Apr 2005	Central Town Center, Nonthaburi, Thailand	
51	Win	42–8–1	Alwi Alhabsyi	UD	6	4 Feb 2005	Sukhothai Thammathirat University, Muang Thong Thani, Thailand	
50	Draw	41–8–1	Jun Arlos	SD	12	16 Nov 2004	Sukhothai Thammathirat University, Muang Thong Thani, Thailand	Retained WBC International light-flyweight title
49	Win	41–8	Ernesto Rubillar	TKO	8 (12)	9 Sep 2004	Chumphon, Thailand	Won vacant WBC International light-flyweight title
48	Win	40–8	Roger Maldecir	UD	6	6 Aug 2004	Phimai, Thailand	
47	Win	39–8	Ramie Gonzaga	UD	6	19 May 2004	Bangkok, Thailand	
46	Loss	38–8	Vic Darchinyan	KO	5 (12)	12 Dec 2003	Badgery's Pavilion, Homebush Bay, Sydney, Australia	IBF flyweight title eliminator
45	Loss	38–7	Vic Darchinyan	TKO	4 (12) 2:54	13 Jun 2003	Auburn RSL Club, Auburn, Sydney, Australia	For IBF Pan Pacific flyweight title
44	Loss	38–6	Peter Culshaw	UD	12	29 Mar 2003	Wembley Conference Centre, Wembley, England, UK	For WBF super-flyweight title
43	Loss	38–5	Hussein Hussein	UD	10	21 Feb 2003	Metro City, Northbridge, Australia	
42	Win	38–4	Jun Pader	UD	8	22 Nov 2002	The Mall Shopping Center Taphra, Bangkok, Thailand	
41	Win	37–4	Vicente Adrales	TKO	5 (6)	20 Sep 2002	The Mall Shopping Center Taphra, Bangkok, Thailand	
40	Win	36–4	Rolly Mandahinog	UD	6	30 Aug 2002	Thongsuk College, Bangkok, Thailand	
39	Win	35–4	Ramil Anito	UD	6	28 Apr 2002	Bangkok, Thailand	
38	Win	34–4	Christian Casino	UD	6	7 Mar 2002	Bangbuathong, Thailand	
37	Win	33–4	Sherwin Alferez	PTS	6	31 Jan 2002	Nakhon Sawan, Thailand	
36	Win	32–4	Antok Gores	KO	4 (8)	3 Oct 2001	Dan Khun Thot, Thailand	
35	Win	31–4	Budi Tapea	PTS	10	18 Jul 2001	Bangkok, Thailand	
34	Win	30–4	Flash Murillo	UD	10	20 Jun 2001	Bangkok, Thailand	
33	Win	29–4	Lito Danggod	PTS	10	15 Nov 2000	Bangkok, Thailand	
32	Win	28–4	Sonny Boy Panding	PTS	10	16 Aug 2000	Bangkok, Thailand	
31	Win	27–4	Freddie Keymaai	PTS	10	21 Jun 2000	Bangkok, Thailand	
30	Loss	26–4	José Antonio Aguirre	MD	12	12 Feb 2000	Mahachai Villa Arena, Samut Sakhon, Thailand	Lost WBC minimumweight title
29	Win	26–3	Jovy Mancha	PTS	10	15 Sep 1999	Bangkok, Thailand	
28	Win	25–3	Wolf Tokimitsu	TKO	12 (12) 2:51	4 May 1999	Mizushima Greenland Gym, Kurashiki, Japan	Retained WBC interim minimumweight title
27	Win	24–3	Dennis Sabsal	UD	10	17 Feb 1999	Bangkok, Thailand	
26	Win	23–3	Rocky Lin	MD	12	23 Aug 1998	Yokohama Arena, Yokohama, Japan	Won vacant WBC interim minimumweight title
25	Win	22–3	Lukchai Dejakul	PTS	10	18 Mar 1998	Bangkok, Thailand	
24	Loss	21–3	Faisol Akbar	PTS	12	30 Aug 1997	Kertaja Stadium, Surabaya, Indonesia	Lost IBF Inter-continental minimumweight title
23	Win	21–2	Al Tarazona	UD	10	16 Jul 1997	Channel 7 Studios, Bangkok, Thailand	
22	Win	20–2	Rogelio Lapian	PTS	10	31 May 1997	Garden Hill Village, Bungsampan, Petchaboon, Thailand	
21	Win	19–2	Jojo Idanio	PTS	10	15 Dec 1996	Chiang Rai Provincial Stadium, Chiang Rai, Thailand	
20	Win	18–2	Bonifacio Terado	PTS	10	16 Nov 1996	Zeer Rangsit Shopping Center, Pathum Thani, Thailand	
19	Win	17–2	Faisol Akbar	UD	10	19 Oct 1996	Bangplee Regional Stadium, Samut Prakan, Thailand	
18	Win	16–2	Rolando Toyogon	UD	10	13 Jul 1996	Chiang Mai Provincial Stadium, Chiang Mai, Thailand	Won vacant IBF Inter-continental minimumweight title
17	Win	15–2	Julio De la Basez	PTS	10	27 Apr 1996	Maha Sarakham Regional Stadium, Maha Sarakham, Thailand	
16	Win	14–2	Benjamin Escobia	TKO	7 (?)	24 Feb 1996	Chachoengsao Municipal Stadium, Chachoengsao, Thailand	
15	Win	13–2	Petchtameo Nratrikoon	PTS	6	28 Nov 1995	Bangkok, Thailand	
14	Win	12–2	Nopakao Pisanurachan	PTS	8	12 Nov 1995	Bangkok, Thailand	
13	Win	11–2	Siribon Wongwienyai	PTS	6	13 Oct 1995	Bangkok Thailand	
12	Win	10–2	Petcharat Nongkipahuyut	KO	4 (?)	18 Aug 1995	Bangkok, Thailand	
11	Win	9–2	Ploudang Blueskygym	KO	1 (?)	15 Jul 1995	Ayutthaya, Thailand	
10	Win	8–2	Sanong Sorjaturong	PTS	6	18 Jun 1995	Bangkok, Thailand	
9	Win	7–2	Proidaen Singmuanak	PTS	4	10 Jun 1995	Bangkok, Thailand	
8	Win	6–2	Densuriya Porsamanchai	PTS	4	20 May 1995	Bangkok, Thailand	
7	Win	5–2	Ploydang Blueskygym	PTS	4	7 May 1995	Bangkok, Thailand	
6	Win	4–2	Muangthorn Kiatapilar	KO	3 (?)	30 Apr 1995	Bangkok, Thailand	
5	Loss	3–2	Kinthong Kiatcharnu	KO	4 (?)	25 Mar 1995	Bangkok, Thailand	
4	Loss	3–1	Todthai Singmuangnoi	PTS	4	4 Mar 1995	Bangkok, Thailand	
3	Win	3–0	Petchsuwan Namuangket	PTS	6	4 Feb 1995	Channel 5 Studio, Bangkok, Thailand	
2	Win	2–0	Kittisak Sithkrucha	PTS	4	14 Jan 1995	Bangkok, Thailand	
1	Win	1–0	Santichai Chorseepravit	KO	4 (?)	13 Dec 1994	Bangkok, Thailand	Professional Debut

== See also ==
- List of Mini-flyweight boxing champions

Achievements
New title	WBC minimumweight champion Interim title August 23, 1998 – September 28, 1999; Promoted	Vacant Title next held by Juan Palacios
Preceded by Ricardo Lopez moved up in weight	WBC minimumweight champion September 28, 1999 – February 11, 2000	Succeeded by José Antonio Aguirre
Vacant Title last held by Jorge Arce	WBC light flyweight champion Interim title July 18, 2006 – October 8, 2006; Stripped	Vacant
