= Erdene Chuluun =

Mongolian boxer

Personal information
- Nickname: Hurricane
- Nationality: Mongolian
- Born: Erdenotsogtyn Tsogtjargal; 5 October 1971 (age 54) Ulaanbaatar, Mongolia
- Height: 160 cm (5 ft 3 in)

Boxing career
- Stance: Orthodox

Boxing record
- Total fights: 11
- Wins: 6
- Win by KO: 2
- Losses: 4
- Draws: 1

Erdene Chuluun (born 5 October 1971 in Ulaanbaatar) is a minimumweight Mongolian boxer who turned pro in 1997.

== Professional boxing record ==
Result	Record	Opponent	Type	Time	Date	Location	Notes
11	Loss	6-4-1	(Philippines) Bert Batawang	UD	22 Feb 2003	(South Korea) Gymnasium, Gangneung	
10	Win	6-3-1	(Philippines) Rey Orias	TKO	21 Sep 2002	(South Korea) Jangchung Gymnasium, Seoul	
9	Loss	5-3-1	(Mexico) Jose Antonio Aguirre	KO	21 Oct 2000	Salon 21, Polanco, Mexico City	WBC World Minimumweight Title
8	Win	5-2-1	(Thailand) Mongkol Charoen	TD	22 Aug 1999	(China) Shenyang	PABA Minimumweight Title
7	Draw	4-2-1	(Indonesia) Julio de la Basez	PTS	9 May 1999	(Indonesia) Surabaya	PABA Minimumweight Title
6	Win	4-2	(South Korea) Jin-Ho Kim	PTS	16 Apr 1999	(South Korea) Dankook University Gym, Seoul	
5	Win	3-2	(Indonesia) Julio de la Basez	TKO	30 Jan 1999	(Thailand) Pattaya City Hall, Pattaya	PABA Minimumweight Title
4	Win	2-2	(Thailand) Ded Donjadee	KO	25 Dec 1998	(Thailand) Bangkok	
3	Win	1-2	(South Korea) Myung-Sup Park	PTS	15 Aug 1998	(China) Wenzhou	
2	Loss	0-2	(Thailand) Surachai Saengmorakot	KO	22 Apr 1998	(Thailand) Bangkok	
1	Loss	0-1	(Thailand) Deeden Kengkarun	KO	22 Dec 1997	(Thailand) Bangkapi School, Bangkok	Professional debut
