= Huai Yot district =

Huai Yot ห้วยยอด
- District
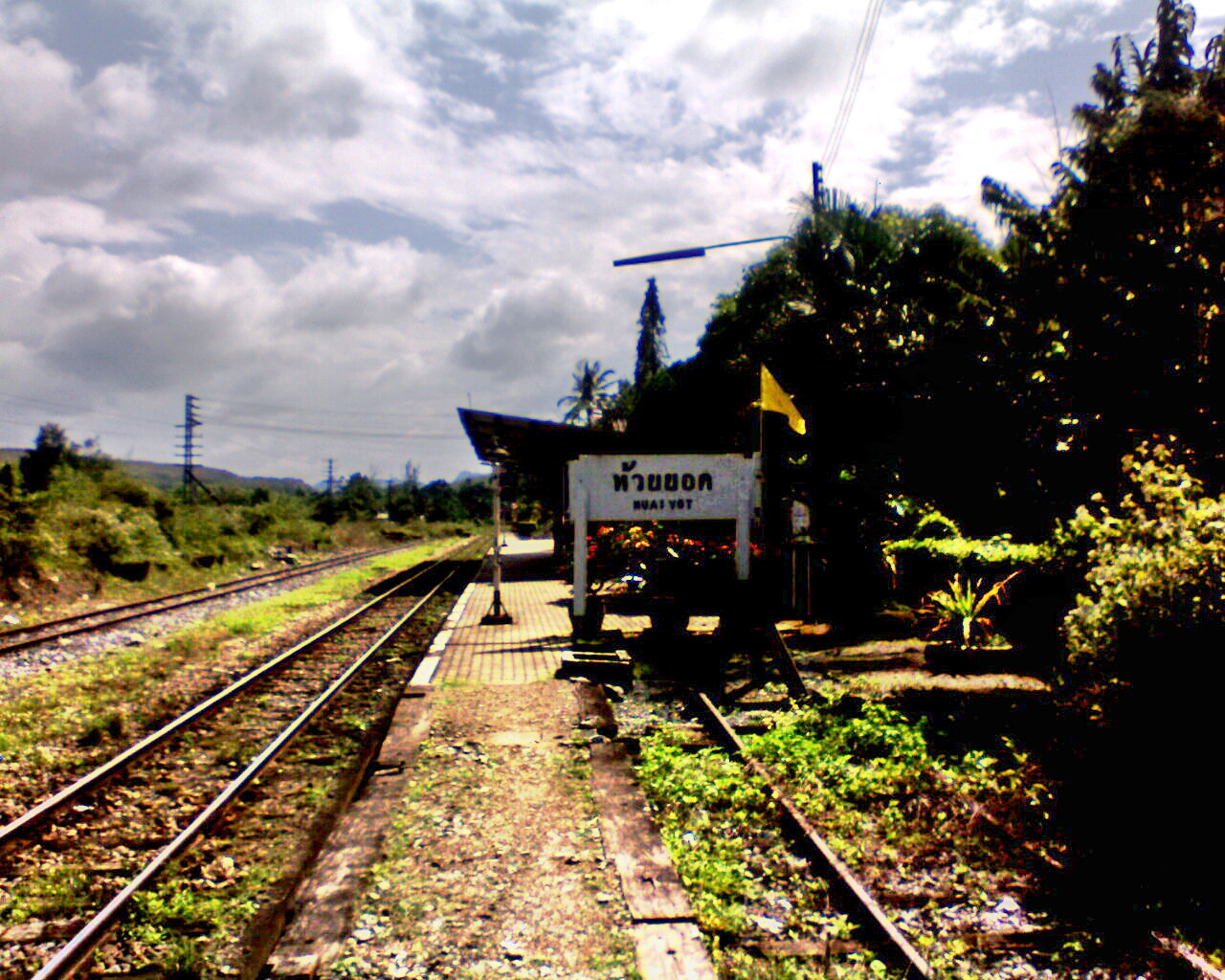
- Huai Yot railway station, 2007

- District location in Trang province
- Coordinates: 7°47′6″N 99°38′6″E
- Country: Thailand
- Province: Trang
- Seat: Huai Yot

Area
  - Total: 753.4 km^{2} (290.9 sq mi)

Population (2005)
  - Total: 90,261
  - Density: 119.8/km^{2} (310/sq mi)
- Time zone: UTC+7 (ICT)
- Postal code: 92130
- Geocode: 9206

Huai Yot (Thai: ห้วยยอด, pronounced [hûa̯j jɔ̂ːt]) is a district (amphoe) in the northern part of Trang province, Thailand.

== Geography ==
Neighboring districts are (from the north clockwise): Ratsada of Trang Province; Thung Song of Nakhon Si Thammarat province; Pa Phayom and Si Banphot of Phatthalung province; Mueang Trang and Wang Wiset of Trang Province; and Bang Khan of Nakhon Si Thammarat province.

== History ==
Originally named Khao Khao (เขาขาว), it was renamed Huai Yot in 1939.

== Administration ==
The district is divided into 16 sub-districts (tambons), which are further subdivided into 133 villages (mubans). There are three townships (thesaban tambons): Huai Yot covers parts of tambons Huai Yot and Khao Pun; Na Wong covers parts of tambons Na Wong, Bang Kung, and Wang Khiri; and Lam Phu Ra covers parts of tambon Lam Phu Ra. There are a further 16 tambon administrative organizations (TAO).

No.	Name	Thai name	Villages	Pop.
1.	Huai Yot	ห้วยยอด	5	11,377
2.	Nong Chang Laen	หนองช้างแล่น	12	7,795
5.	Bang Di	บางดี	12	7,679
6.	Bang Kung	บางกุ้ง	9	5,317
7.	Khao Kop	เขากอบ	12	7,894
8.	Khao Khao	เขาขาว	7	3,797
9.	Khao Pun	เขาปูน	7	4,791
10.	Pak Chaem	ปากแจ่ม	7	4,927
11.	Pak Khom	ปากคม	7	3,438
14.	Tha Ngio	ท่างิ้ว	8	4,557
15.	Lamphu Ra	ลำภูรา	10	5,709
16.	Na Wong	นาวง	11	6,504
17.	Huai Nang	ห้วยนาง	8	5,710
19.	Nai Tao	ในเตา	4	2,704
20.	Thung To	ทุ่งต่อ	8	3,738
21.	Wang Khiri	วังคีรี	6	4,324

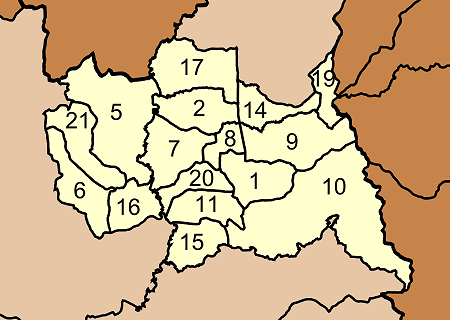

Missing numbers are tambons which now form Ratsada District.
