= Armando Torres =

Mexican boxer (born 1981)

Personal information
- Nickname: Ichiro Ozeki
- Born: Armando Hernández Torres; 10 January 1981 (age 45) Mexico City, Mexico
- Height: 1.65 m (5 ft 5 in)
- Weight: Light flyweight Minimumweight

Boxing career
- Reach: 1.74 m (69 in)
- Stance: Orthodox

Boxing record
- Total fights: 43
- Wins: 25
- Win by KO: 19
- Losses: 18
- Draws: 0
- No contests: 0

Armando Hernández Torres (born 10 January 1981) is a Mexican professional boxer and is the current NABF Minimumweight Champion.

== Professional career ==
On June 18, 2011, Armando beat the veteran Iván Meneses, to win NABF Minimumweight Championship.

=== WBA Minimumweight Championship ===
In his next fight Torres will face the WBA Minimumweight Champion Juan Palacios.

== Professional record ==
16 Wins (11 knockouts), 8 Losses, 0 Draw
Res.	Record	Opponent	Type	Rd., Time	Date	Location	Notes
—N/a	—N/a	(Nicaragua) Juan Palacios	—N/a	12	August 13, 2011	Acapulco, Guerrero, Mexico	For the WBA Minimumweight title.
