= Khuan Khanun district =

Khuan Khanun ควนขนุน
- District
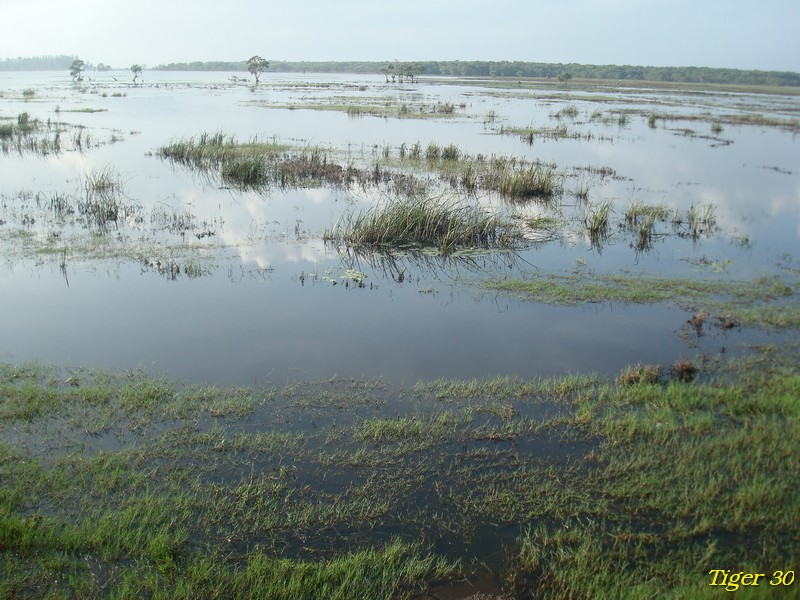

- District location in Phatthalung province
- Coordinates: 7°44′6″N 100°0′36″E
- Country: Thailand
- Province: Phatthalung

Area
  - Total: 454.0 km^{2} (175.3 sq mi)

Population (2005)
  - Total: 82,425
  - Density: 181.6/km^{2} (470/sq mi)
- Time zone: UTC+7 (ICT)
- Postal code: 93110
- Geocode: 9305

Khuan Khanun (Thai: ควนขนุน, pronounced [kʰūa̯n kʰā.nǔn]) is a district (amphoe) of Phatthalung province, southern Thailand.

== Geography ==
Neighboring districts are (from the south clockwise): Mueang Phatthalung, Srinagarindra, Si Banphot, and Pa Phayom of Phatthalung Province; Cha-uat of Nakhon Si Thammarat province; and Ranot of Songkhla province.

The Phru Khuan Khi Sian wetlands at Thale Noi Lake are protected as a Ramsar wetland. It is part of the larger Thale Noi Non-hunting Area. Thale Noi is the northernmost part of Songkhla Lake, separated from the main body of Thale Luang by a 0.5 m high natural sand bar, the waters are connected by a 2 km wide channel. While Thale Noi itself has only an area of 28 km^{2}, it is surrounded by a swamp area of 459 km^{2}.

== History ==
The district was established in 1896, then named Udon (อุดร). The district office was at first in village 5 of tambon Khuan Khanun, and was since then relocated four times. In 1899 it was moved to Ban Makok Tai, and the district was renamed Makok Tai (มะกอกใต้). In 1903 it was renamed Pak Pra (ปากประ). In 1907 it was moved to Ban Thale Noi, so the district was then named Thale Noi (ทะเลน้อย), and when it was again moved to Ban Phanang Tung, the district was named Phanang Tung (พนางตุง) accordingly. Finally in 1923 the district office came to its present location in Ban Khuan Khanun.

== Economy ==
The district is home to the Ban Phraek Ha Agricultural Cooperative, founded in 2015 with 50 members. As of 2019, the co-op has more than 300 members, or half of all rubber farmers in the province. The co-op buys natural latex from local farmers and, assisted by scientists from the National Science and Technology Development Agency (NSTDA), its factory produces latex pillows and mattresses under its Talung Latex brand from a proprietary latex concentrate called "ParaFIT". "Para" is short for yang para, 'rubber latex' in Thai, and "FIT", 'Foam Innovation of Thailand'. The demand for latex pillows has increased globally to about 8.5 billion baht in 2018, and is projected to grow 4.9% yearly from 2019 to 2025. At present, Ban Phraek Ha Agricultural Cooperative has the capacity to produce 400 latex pillows and six king-size mattresses a day. The co-op is in the process of quadrupling ParaFIT production capacity from two to eight tonnes.

== Administration ==
The district is divided into 12 sub-districts (tambons), which are further subdivided into 124 villages (mubans). Khuan Khanun and Makok Nuea are two sub-district municipality (thesaban tambons), each covers parts of the same-named tambons. There are a further 12 tambon administrative organizations (TAO).

No.	Name	Thai	Villages	Pop.
1.	Khuan Khanun	ควนขนุน	9	8,498
2.	Thale Noi	ทะเลน้อย	10	6,621
4.	Na Khayat	นาขยาด	12	8,103
5.	Phanom Wang	พนมวังก์	8	5,978
6.	Laem Tanot	แหลมโตนด	7	4,833
8.	Pan Tae	ปันแต	13	6,061
9.	Tanot Duan	โตนดด้วน	11	5,864
10.	Don Sai	ดอนทราย	11	5,402
11.	Makok Nuea	มะกอกเหนือ	9	7,340
12.	Phanang Tung	พนางตุง	13	9,807
13.	Chamuang	ชะมวง	15	7,934
16.	Phraek Ha	แพรกหา	8	5,612

Missing numbers are tambon which now form Pa Phayom district.
