= Lorenzo Trejo =

Mexican boxer (born 1977)

Lorenzo Trejo Valencia (born 15 June 1977), known as Lorenzo Trejo, is a Mexican boxer.

== World title fights ==
In 2003, he lost to Iván Calderón for the World Boxing Organization minimumweight world title.

In 2006, Trejo lost to Eagle Kyowa for the World Boxing Council minimumweight world title.

In 2007, Trejo lost to Édgar Sosa for the World Boxing Council light flyweight world title.

== Other notable opponents ==
Trejo lost to Antonio Nieves in 2015.
