= Gong language =

Tibeto-Burman language of Western Thailand

Gong
- Ugong
- Native to: Western Thailand
- Region: Suphan Buri, Uthai Thani
- Ethnicity: 500 Ugong (2007)
- Native speakers: 150 (2007 Bradley)
- Language family: Sino-Tibetan: Tibeto-Burman; Lolo–Burmese (?); Gong
- Writing system: Thai script

Language codes
- ISO 639-3: ugo
- Glottolog: ugon1239
- ELP: Ugong
- Gong is classified as Severely Endangered by the UNESCO Atlas of the World's Languages in Danger.

The Gong language (also 'Ugong, Ugong, Lawa or Ugawng, with U- meaning 'person') is an endangered Tibeto-Burman language of Western Thailand, spoken in isolated pockets in Uthai Thani and Suphanburi provinces.

== History ==
The ethnic group was first known to Westerners in the 1920s, when the language was already considered in severe decline (Kerr 1927). In the 1970s, David Bradley began working on the language in the several areas where it was still used, by which time it was already extinct in two of the locations given by Kerr (1927) about 50 years earlier. The people were then forced from two of these villages when the Electricity Generating Authority of Thailand built dams over the Kwae Yai and Khwae Noi River (Bradley 1989). Because of the displacement of the people of an already declining language, the language is considered especially vulnerable to extinction. The last children speakers were in the 1970s and the children now speak Thai as their first language.

== Classification ==
The classification of Gong within Tibeto-Burman is uncertain, although Bradley (1989) suggests that it is a divergent Lolo-Burmese language that does not fit into either the Burmish or Loloish branches. Hsiu (2018) considers Gong to be a separate branch of Tibeto-Burman, rather than part of Lolo-Burmese.

== Dialects ==
The Gong language consists of two dialects (Ethnologue).

- Khok Khwai village, Uthai Thani province (moribund); documented by Rujjanavet (1986)
- Kok Chiang village, Suphan Buri province (endangered and now dispersed); documented by Thawornpat (2006) and David Bradley

Gong was once also spoken in western Kanchanaburi province, but is now extinct in that province (Ethnologue). Word lists of two Gong varieties (namely Lawa of Kwê Yai and Lawa of Kwê Noi) from Kanchanaburi have been collected by Kerr (1927).

== Distribution ==
Gong families now live in the following 3 villages.

- Lawa Wang Khwai village, Wang Yao Subdistrict (วังยาว), Dan Chang District, Suphanburi province (3 families)
- Kok Chiang village, Huai Khamin Subdistrict (ห้วยขมิ้น), Dan Chang District, Suphanburi province (36 families)
- Khok Khwai village (คอกควาย), Thong Lang Subdistrict (ทองหลาง), Huai Khot District, Uthai Thani province (15 families); reported as Baan Lawa village 3 in Wright, et al. (1991).

There are around 500 ethnic Gong people and 50 speakers of the Gong language. There are also many Lao Krang people living in the Gong areas.

=== Former locations ===
Gong used to be much more widespread, and was found in the Khwae Noi River, Khwae Yai River, and Bo Phloi River watersheds (Bradley 1989). It was reportedly spoken in locations including:

- Kanchanaburi province
  - Lat Ya (northwest of Kanchanaburi town)
  - Thong Pha Phum District (located along the Khwae Noi River)
  - Ban Lawa (located several kilometres downriver along the Khwae Noi River, from the former location of Sangkhlaburi near the Three Pagodas Pass)
  - Sao Hong, 10 kilometres south of Bo Phloi
  - Phanom Thuan District
  - Bo Phloi, Nong Pling, Lam Iso, Nong Li (หนองรี), and Nong Plue
  - Khlot Khoi
- Suphanburi province
  - Tumakok, Dan Chang District, Suphanburi province (now an ethnic Karen township; originally settled by Gong people from Talao/Hin Hak during the 1800s)
  - Sanakphai, Suphanburi province
  - Wang Khwai (known in Ugong as Kabe and in Lao as Kapheun), Suphanburi province
- Uthai Thani province
  - Ban Bung (บ้านบึง), Ban Rai District (near district headquarters)
  - Thong Lang, Huai Khot District
  - Iphung, Cawat, and Huai Haeng (exact locations uncertain)

In Kanchanaburi province, many Gong have intermarried with Karen and Mon people. Sisawat and Sangkhlaburi have since been flooded by the construction of a dam, and the speakers have been dispersed to other places. As of 1991 in Kanchanaburi province, Gong has not been spoken for 20–30 years, with most Gong people speaking Thai or Karen instead.

== Phonology ==
=== Vowels ===
Gong Vowels
	Front	Central	Back
Close	i		u
Close	ɪ		ʊ
Mid	e	ə	o
Mid	ɛ	ə	ɔ
Open		ä	

=== Consonants ===
Gong Consonants
		Labial	Alveolar	Palatal	Velar	Glottal
Nasal		m	n	ɲ	ŋ	
Stop	implosive	ɓ	ɗ	ʄ	ɠ	
Stop	voiced	b	d	ɟ	ɡ	
Stop	voiceless	p	t	c	k	
Fricative	voiced	v	z			ɦ
Fricative	voiceless	f	s			h
Approximant			l	j	w	
Rhotic			r			

== Grammar ==
Gong has SOV (verb-final) word order.

== See also ==
- Gong vocabulary lists (Wiktionary)

== Notes and references ==
- Daniel Nettle and Suzanne Romaine. Vanishing Voices: The Extinction of the World's Languages. Oxford: Oxford University Press, 2000. Page 10.
- Thawornpat, Mayuree. 2006. Gong: An endangered language of Thailand. Doctoral dissertation, Mahidol University.
- Thawornpat, Mayuree. 2007. Gong phonological characteristics. Mon-Khmer Studies 37. 197–216.
