= Lao Khwan district =

Lao Khwan เลาขวัญ
- District
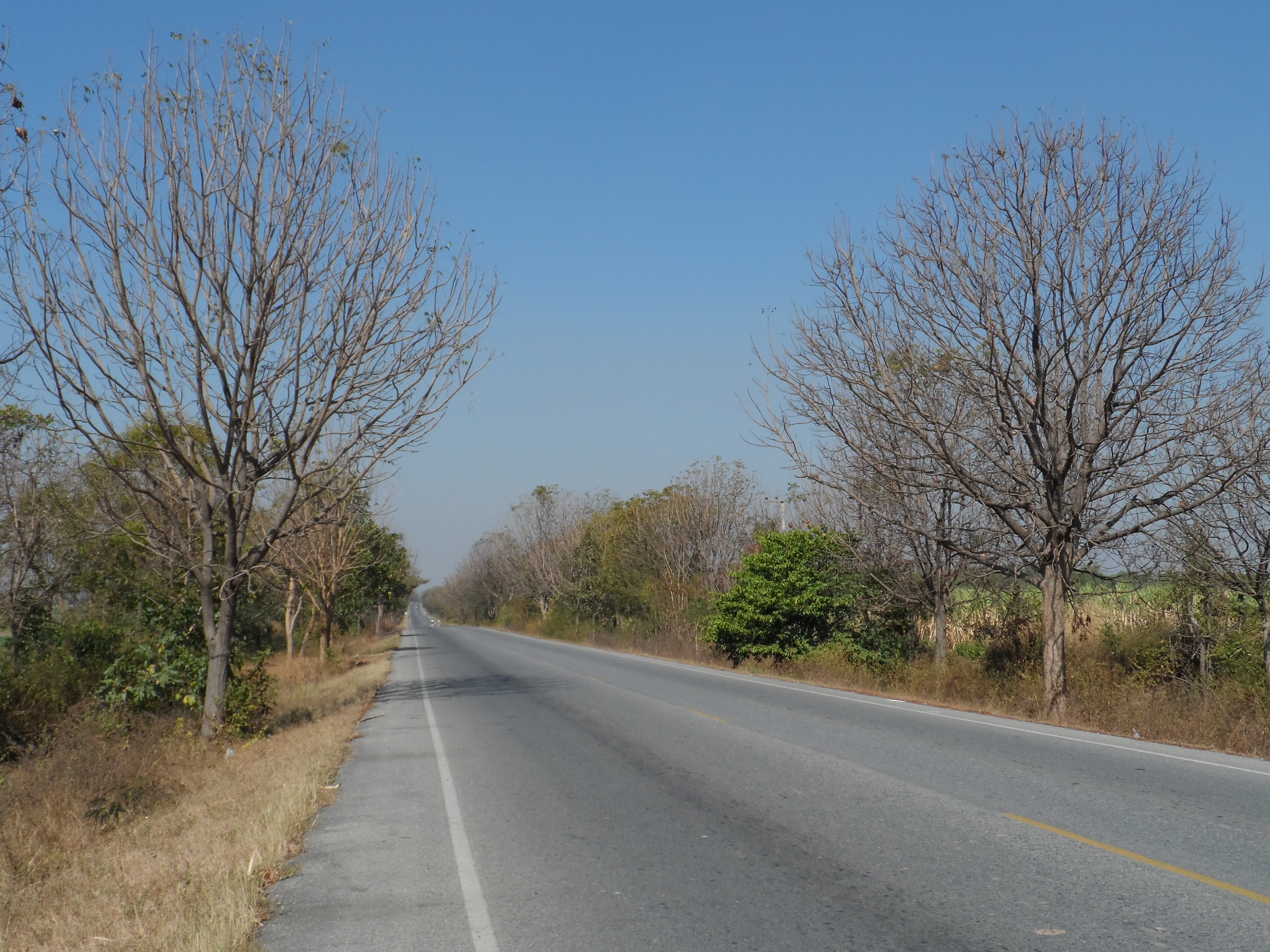
- Road 3306, tambon Lao Khwan

- District location in Kanchanaburi province
- Coordinates: 14°35′47″N 99°46′29″E
- Country: Thailand
- Province: Kanchanaburi
- Seat: Lao Khwan

Area
  - Total: 831 km^{2} (321 sq mi)

Population (2024)
  - Total: 58,587
  - Density: 70/km^{2} (180/sq mi)
- Time zone: UTC+7 (ICT)
- Postal code: 71210
- Calling code: 034
- ISO 3166 code: TH-7110

Lao Khwan (Thai: เลาขวัญ, pronounced [lāw kʰwǎn]) is a district (amphoe) in the northeastern part of Kanchanaburi province, central Thailand.

== History ==
Laotian people moved to establish a new village in the area of Ban Ko Ban Kao. Later people from Bo Phloi moved to the area. When the government established a new town, they named it Ban Lao Khwan.
The minor district (king amphoe) Lao Khwan was created on 12 October 1971, when the three subdistricts (tambons) Lao Khwan, Nong Son, and Nong Pradu were split off from Phanom Thuan district. It was upgraded to a full district on 8 September 1976.

== Geography ==
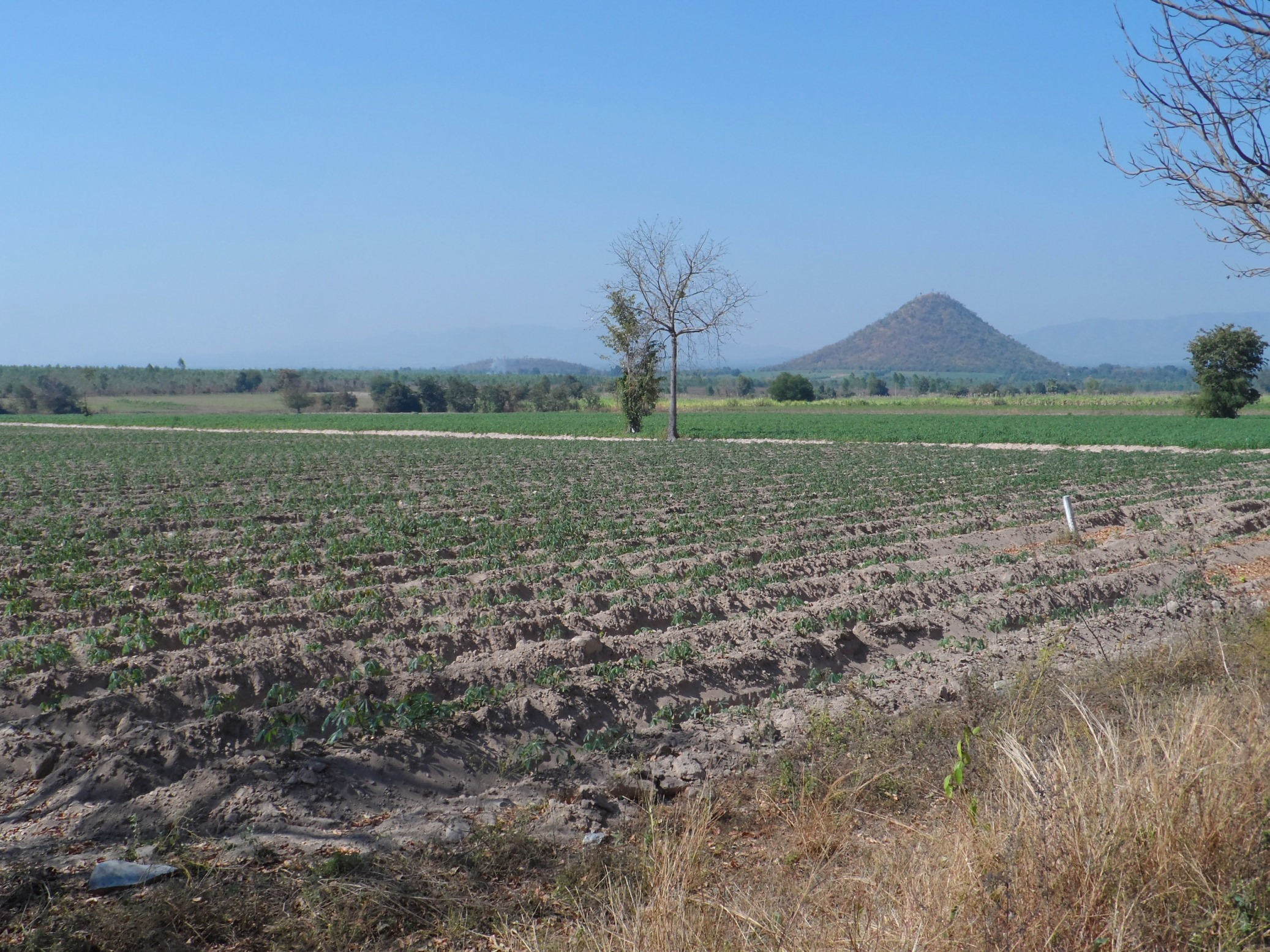
Cassava fields near Ban Khao Wang, in January, during Thailand's dry season

Neighboring districts are (from the south clockwise) Huai Krachao, Bo Phloi, Nong Prue of Kanchanaburi Province, Dan Chang, Nong Ya Sai, Don Chedi and U Thong of Suphanburi province.

== Administration ==
=== Provincial administration ===
The district is divided into seven subdistricts (tambons), which are further subdivided into 90 administrative villages (mubans).

No.	Subdistrict	Thai	Villages	Pop.
1.	Lao Khwan	เลาขวัญ	16	9,815
2.	Nong Son	หนองโสน	11	8,230
3.	Nong Pradu	หนองประดู่	12	10,011
4.	Nong Pling	หนองปลิง	18	9,405
5.	Nong Nok Kaeo	หนองนกแก้ว	10	6,237
6.	Thung Krabam	ทุ่งกระบ่ำ	14	6,980
7.	Nong Fai	หนองฝ้าย	9	7,909
		Total	90	58,587

=== Local government ===
==== Municipalities ====
As of December 2024 there are two municipal (thesaban) areas in the district: Lao Khwan and Nong Fai subdistrict municipalities (thesaban tambon) cover parts of the same-named subdistricts.

Subdistrict municipality	Pop.	LAO code	website
Lao Khwan	2,648	05711001	laokwan.go.th
Nong Fai	2,203	05711002	nongfai.go.th

==== Subdistrict administrative organizations ====
The non-municipal areas are administered by seven subdistrict administrative organizations - SAO (ongkan borihan suan tambon - o bo toh).

Subdistrict adm.org - SAO	Pop.	LAO code	website
Nong Pradu SAO	10,011	06711004	nongpradu.go.th
Nong Pling SAO	9,405	06711005	nongpling.go.th
Nong Son SAO	8,230	06711007	nongsano-kan.go.th
Lao Khwan SAO	7,167	06711003	laokhaun.go.th
Thung Krabam SAO	6,980	06711008	thungkrabam.go.th
Nong Nok Kaeo SAO	6,237	06711009	nongnokkaew.go.th
Nong Fai SAO	5,706	06711006	hnongfai.go.th

== Education ==
- 42 primary schools
- 2 secondary schools

== Healthcare ==
=== Hospitals ===
Lao Khwan district is served by one hospital

- Lao Khwan Hospital with 54 beds.

=== Health promoting hospitals ===
In the district there are thirteen health-promoting hospitals in total.

1 Lao Khwan	2 Nong Fai	2 Nong Nok Kaeo	2 Nong Pling
2 Nong Pradu	2 Nong Son	2 Thung Krabam

== Religion ==
There are sixty-eight Theravada Buddhist temples in the district.

3 Nong Fai	6 Nong Nok Kaeo	9 Thung Krabam	11 Lao Khwan
12 Nong Son	13 Nong Pradu	14 Nong Pling

The Christians have two churches.
