= Krasiao Dam =

- Interactive map of Krasiao Dam
- Country: Thailand
- Location: Huai Khamin Subdistrict, Dan Chang District, Suphan Buri Province
- Coordinates: 14°49′57″N 99°39′41″E
- Purpose: Irrigation, flood control
- Status: Operational
- Construction began: 1966
- Opening date: 1981
- Construction cost: 960 million baht
- Built by: Royal Irrigation Department (RID)
- Owner: RID

Dam and spillways
- Type of dam: Earthen
- Height (foundation): 32.5 m
- Length: 4,250 m (13,940 ft)

Reservoir
- Total capacity: 390 m^{3}
- Active capacity: 240 m^{3}
- Catchment area: 1,220 km^{2}

Krasiao Dam (Thai: เขื่อนกระเสียว, RTGS: Khuean Krasiao, pronounced [kʰɯ̀a̯n krā.sǐa̯w]) is in Huai Khamin Subdistrict, Dan Chang District, Suphan Buri Province, Thailand. It was built in 1980. It is an earthen dam built to store water from the Krasiao River. Its length is 4,250 meters and its height is 32.5 meters. Its reservoir is 28,750 rai (46.00 km^{2}; 17.76 sq mi). The capacity of the dam is 240 million metres^{3}. It is the longest earthen dam in Thailand. Its beneficial area is 350,000 rai.
