= Huai Krachao district =

Huai Krachao ห้วยกระเจา
- District
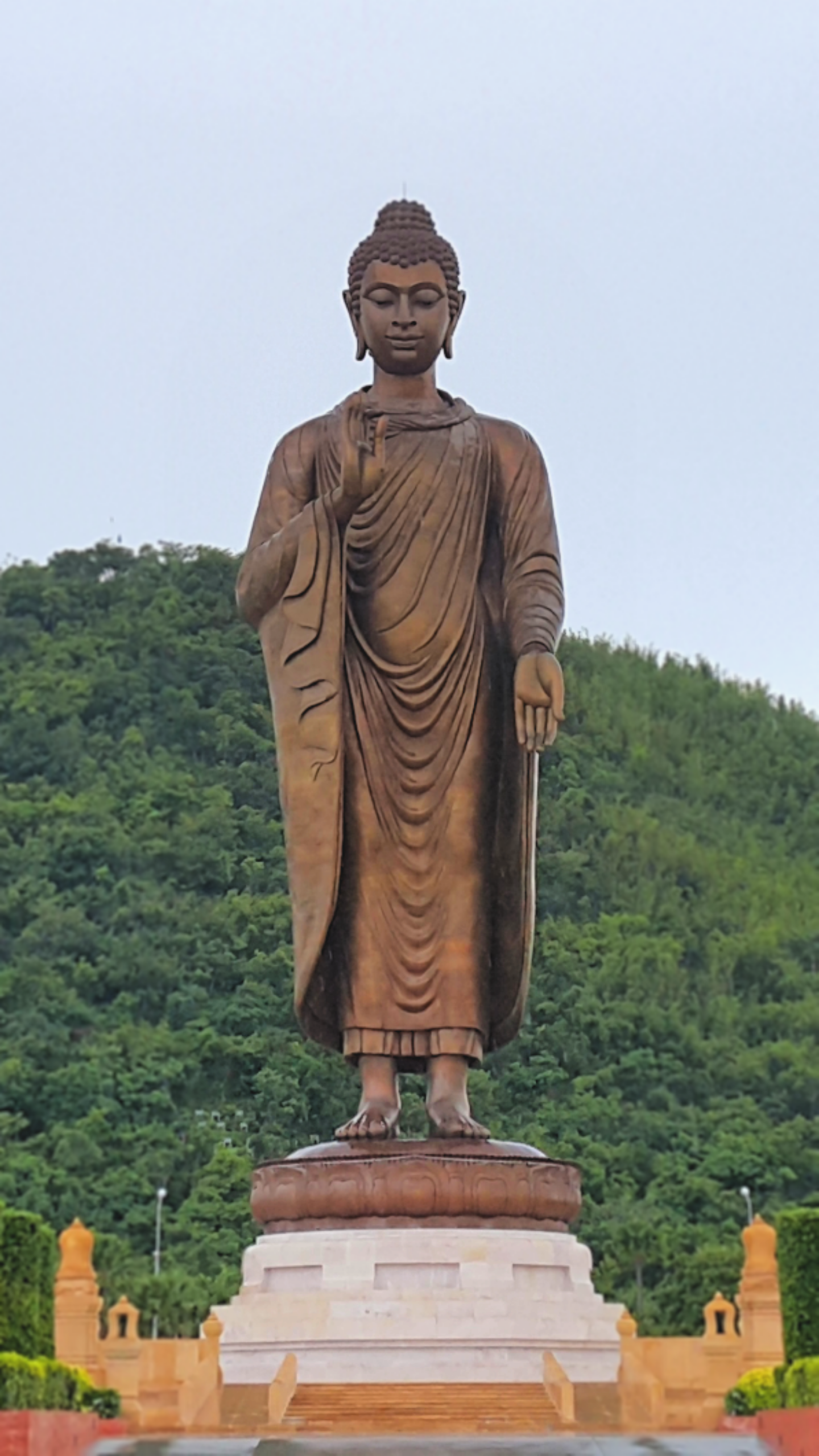
- Phra Phutta Maha Metta tallest statue in the province

- District location in Kanchanaburi province
- Coordinates: 14°19′38″N 99°40′0″E
- Country: Thailand
- Province: Kanchanaburi
- Seat: Huai Krachao

Area
  - Total: 622 km^{2} (240 sq mi)

Population (2024)
  - Total: 34,098
  - Density: 55/km^{2} (140/sq mi)
- Time zone: UTC+7 (ICT)
- Postal code: 71170
- Calling code: 034
- ISO 3166 code: TH-7113

Huai Krachao (ห้วยกระเจา, pronounced [hûa̯j krā.t͡ɕāw]) is a district (amphoe) in the eastern part of Kanchanaburi province, central Thailand.

== History ==
Subdistricts Huai Krachao, Wang Phai, Don Salaep and Salong Ruea were separated from Phanom Thuan district and formed Huai Krachao minor district (king amphoe) on 26 May 1994. It was upgraded to a full district, published in Royal Gazette on 26 September 1997 and effective on 11 October 1997.

== Geography ==
Neighboring districts are (from the south clockwise) Phanom Thuan, Bo Phloi, Lao Khwan of Kanchanaburi Province and U Thong of Suphanburi province.

== Toponymy ==
The local waterway was called "Huai Kop Chao", because there were many frogs "Kop Chao". This name changed to "Huai Krachao" and so begame the name of the district.

== Administration ==
=== Provincial administration ===
The district is divided into four subdistricts (tambons), which are further subdivided into 73 administrative villages (mubans).

| No. | Subdistrict | Thai | Villages | Pop. |
|---|---|---|---|---|
| 1. | Huai Krachao | ห้วยกระเจา | 21 | 9,134 |
| 2. | Wang Phai | วังไผ่ | 11 | 4,596 |
| 3. | Don Salaep | ดอนแสลบ | 24 | 12,261 |
| 4. | Salong Ruea | สระลงเรือ | 17 | 8,107 |
| | | Total | 73 | 34,098 |

=== Local government ===
==== Municipalities ====
As of December 2024 there are two municipal (thesaban) areas in the district: Huai Krachao and Salong Ruea subdistrict municipalities (thesaban tambons) cover the whole subdistricts.

| Subdistrict municipality | Pop. | LAO code | website |
|---|---|---|---|
| Huai Krachao | 9,134 | 05711301 | huaikrachao.go.th |
| Salong Ruea | 6,536 | 05711302 | salongruea.go.th |

==== Subdistrict administrative organizations ====
The non-municipal areas are administered by two subdistrict administrative organization - SAO (ongkan borihan suan tambon - o bo toh).

| Subdistrict adm.org - SAO | Pop. | LAO code | website |
|---|---|---|---|
| Don Salaep SAO | 12,261 | 06711303 | donsalab.go.th |
| Wang Phai SAO | 4,596 | 06711304 | wangphai.go.th |

== Education ==
- 24 primary schools
- 1 secondary school

== Healthcare ==
=== Hospitals ===
Huai Krachao district is served by one hospital

- Huai Krachao Chaloem Phrakiat Hospital with 30 beds.

=== Health promoting hospitals ===
In the district there are six health-promoting hospitals in total.

| 1 Salong Ruea | 1 Wang Phai | 2 Don Chalaep | 2 Huai Krachao |

== Religion ==
There are thirty-two Theravada Buddhist temples in the district.

| 3 Wang Phai | 8 Salong Ruea | 10 Dan Salaep | 11 Huai Krachao |

The Christians have three churches.
