= Si Sawat district =

Si Sawat ศรีสวัสดิ์
- District
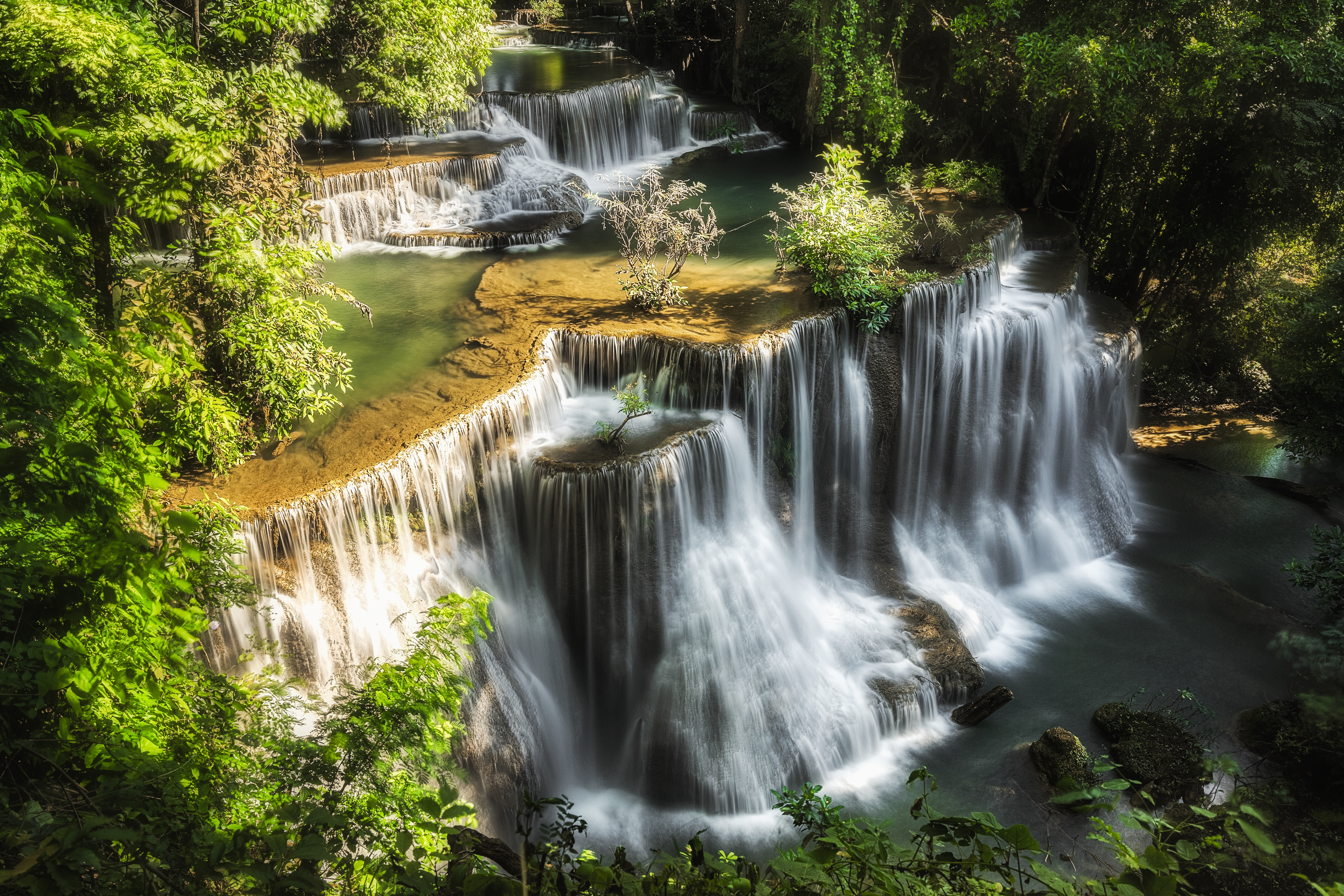
- Huai Mae Khamin Waterfall

- District location in Kanchanaburi province
- Coordinates: 14°35′57″N 99°6′50″E
- Country: Thailand
- Province: Kanchanaburi
- Seat: Dan Mae Chalaep

Area
  - Total: 3,296 km^{2} (1,273 sq mi)

Population (2024)
  - Total: 26,857
  - Density: 8/km^{2} (21/sq mi)
- Time zone: UTC+7 (ICT)
- Postal code: 71220 + 71250
- Calling code: 034
- ISO 3166 code: TH-7104

Si Sawat (Thai: ศรีสวัสดิ์, pronounced [sǐː sā.wàt]) is a district (amphoe) in Kanchanaburi province, western Thailand and is located northwest of Bangkok.

== Geography ==
The district is dominated by the Si Nakharin Reservoir, which is part of Khuean Srinagarindra National Park. The 140-metre-high Si Nakharin Dam was finished in 1980 and creates a 419 km^{2} impoundment of the Kwae Yai River. The dam has received criticism for being built on the Si Sawat fault line.
To the south of the district is Erawan National Park, best known for its Erawan Waterfall.

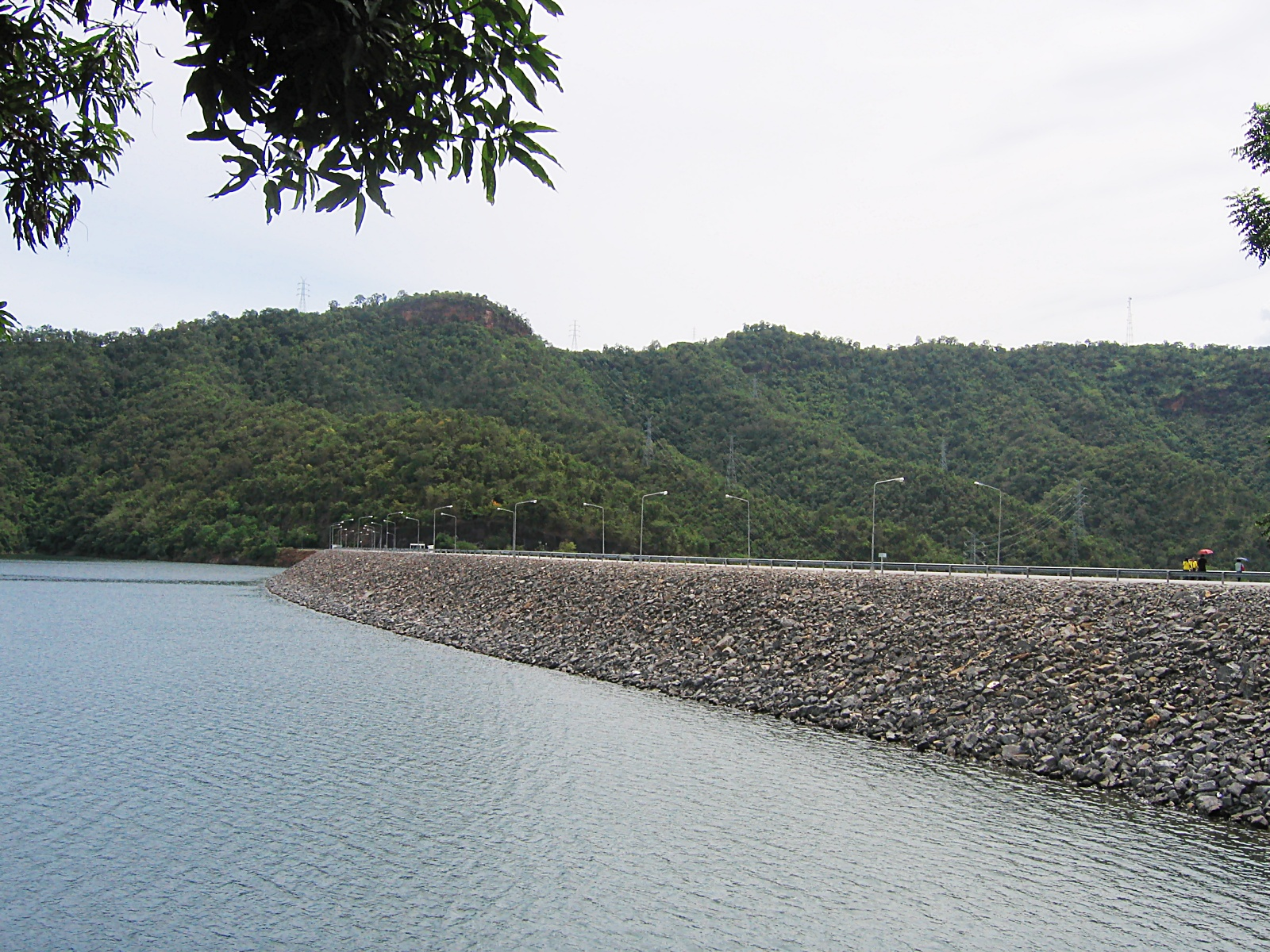
Si Nakharin Dam

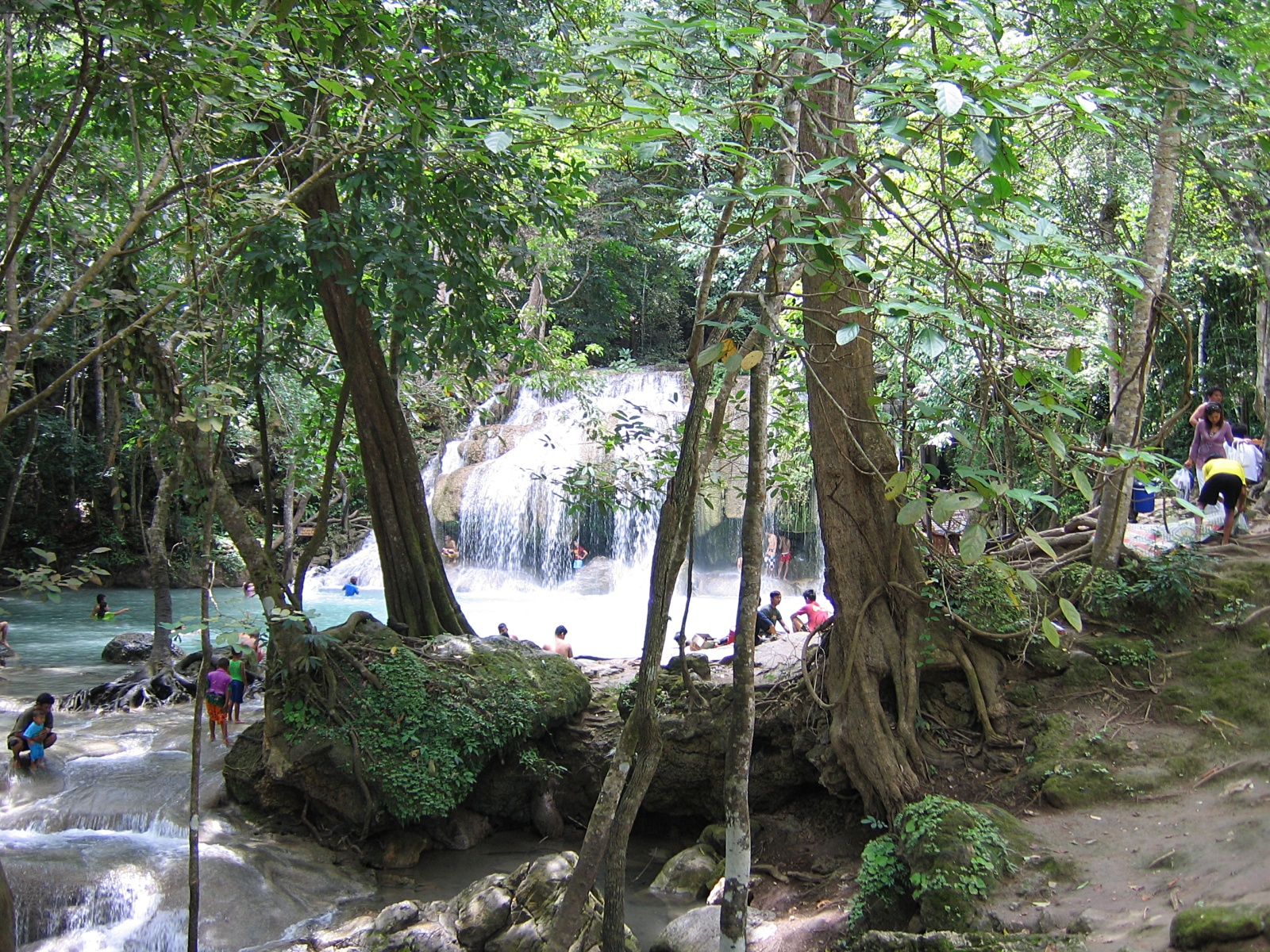
Erawan waterfall

Neighboring districts are (from the north clockwise) Ban Rai of Uthai Thani province, Dan Chang of Suphanburi province, Nong Prue, Bo Phloi, Kanchanaburi, Sai Yok and Thong Pha Phum of Kanchanburi Province.

== Administration ==
=== Provincial administration ===
The district is divided into six subdistricts (tambons), which are further subdivided into 33 administrative villages (mubans).

No.	Subdistrict	Thai	Villages	Pop.
1.	Na Suan	นาสวน	5	4,748
2.	Dan Mae Chalaep	ดานแม่แฉลบ	8	4,743
3.	Nong Pet	หนองเป็ด	4	2,623
4.	Tha Kradan	ท่ากระดาน	5	6,161
5.	Khao Chot	เขาโจด	5	4,602
6.	Mae Krabung	แม่กระบุง	6	3,980
		Total	33	26,857

=== Local government ===
==== Minicipalities ====
As of December 2024 there are: two municipal (thesaban) areas in the district: Khao Chot subdistrict municipality (thesaban tambon) consists of the whole Khao Chot district and Erawan subdistrict municipality covers parts of Tha Kradan subdistrict..

Subdistrict municipality	Pop.	LAO code	website
Khao Chot	4,602	05710402	khaochot.go.th

Erawan subdistrict mun.	Pop.	05710401	erawankan.go.th
Tha Kradan	1,013		

==== Subdistrict administrative organizations ====
The non-municipal areas are administered by five subdistrict administrative organizations - SAO (ongkan borihan suan tambon - o bo toh).

Subdistrict adm.org - SAO	Pop.	LAO code	website
Tha Kradan SAO	5,148	06710404	thakadan.go.th
Na Suan SAO	4,748	06710405	nasuan.go.th
Dan Mae Chalaep SAO	4,743	06710403	danmaechalap.go.th
Mae Krabung SAO	3,980	06710406	makrabung.go.th
Nong Pet SAO	2,623	06710407	nhongped.go.th

== Education ==
- 21 primary schools
- 1 secondary school

== Healthcare ==
=== Hospital ===
Si Sawat district is served by two hospitals

- Tha Kradan Hospital with 32 beds.
- Suk Siri Si Sawat Hospital with 10 beds.

=== Health promoting hospitals ===
In the district there are eight health-promoting hospitals in total, of which;

1 Dan Mae Chalaep	1 Na Suan	1 Mae Krabung
1 Na Suan	2 Khao Chot	2 Tha Kradan

== Religion ==
There are thirty-seven Theravada Buddhist temples in the district.

2 Mae Krabung	5 Nong Pet	6 Tha Kradan
7 Dan Mae Chalaep	8 Khao Chot	9 Na Suan

The Christians have three churches.
