= Nong Prue district =

Nong Prue หนองปรือ
- District
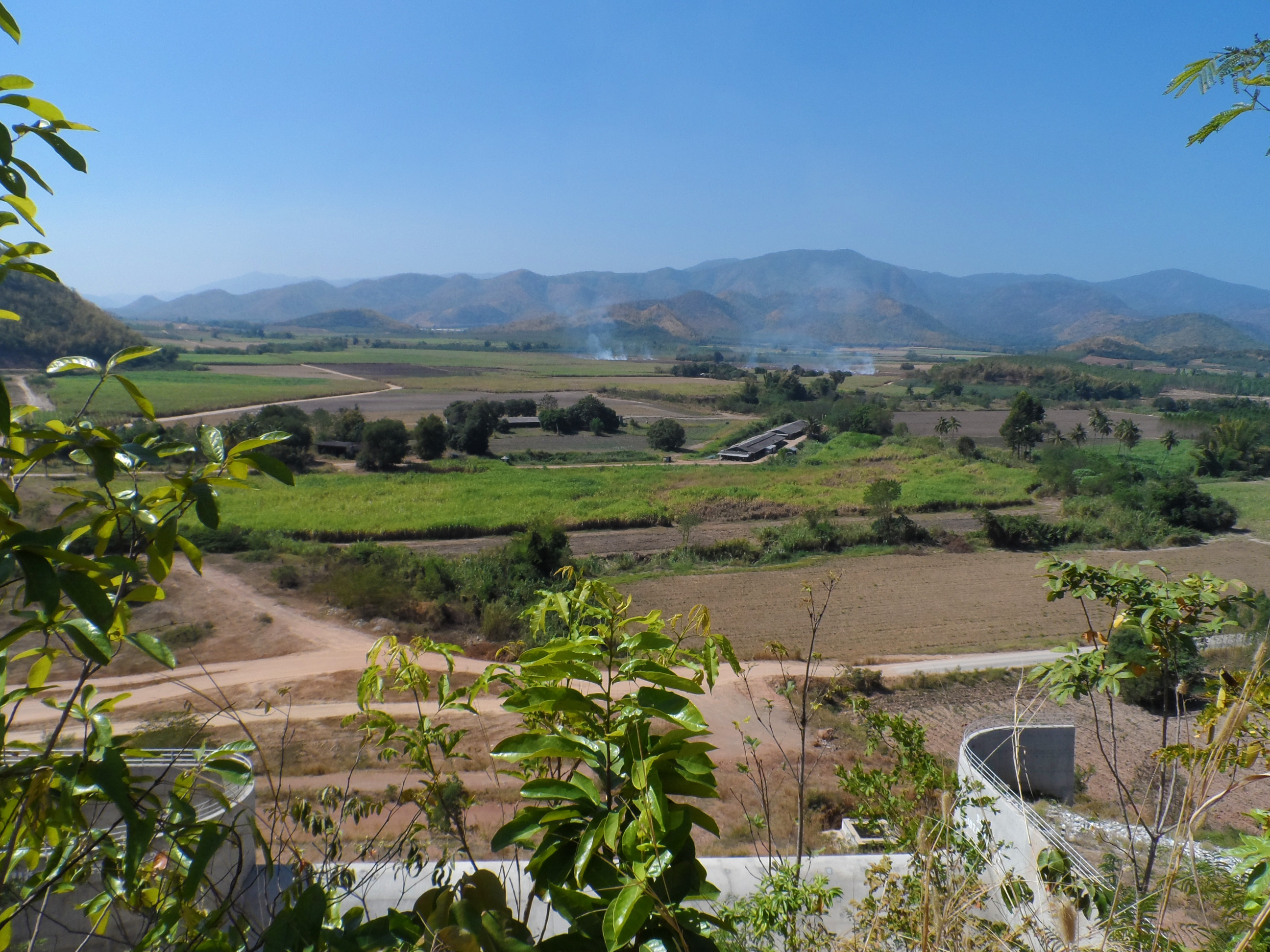
- Topography Nong Prue district

- District location in Kanchanaburi province
- Coordinates: 14°36′41″N 99°27′1″E
- Country: Thailand
- Province: Kanchanaburi
- Seat: Nong Prue

Area
  - Total: 502 km^{2} (194 sq mi)

Population (2024)
  - Total: 31,732
  - Density: 63/km^{2} (160/sq mi)
- Time zone: UTC+7 (ICT)
- Postal code: 71220
- Calling code: 034
- ISO 3166 code: TH-7112

Nong Prue (หนองปรือ, pronounced [nɔ̌ːŋ prɯ̄ː]) is a district (amphoe) in the northeastern part of Kanchanaburi province, central Thailand.

== History ==
The two subdistricts Nong Prue and Nong Pla Lai were split of from Bo Phloi district to establish the minor district (king amphoe) Nong Prue on 22 April 1992. A third subdistrict, Somdet Charoen, was later included in the new minor district as well. The minor district was upgraded to a full district on 11 October 1997.

== Geography ==
Neighboring districts are (from the east clockwise) Lao Khwan, Bo Phloi, Si Sawat of Kanchanaburi province and Dan Chang of Suphanburi province.

== Toponymy ==
The district is named after the Prue plant, Cyperus sp.

== Administration ==
=== Provincial administration ===
The district is divided into three subdistricts (tambons), which are further subdivided into 43 administrative villages (mubans).

No.	Subdistrict	Thai	Villages	Pop.
1.	Nong Prue	หนองปรือ	22	18,210
2.	Nong Pla Lai	หนองปลาไหล	14	6,536
3.	Somdet Charoen	สมเด็จเจริญ	7	6,986
		Total	43	31,732

=== Local government ===
==== Municipalities ====
As of December 2024 there are three municipal (thesaban) areas in the district: Somdet Charoen and Nong Pla Lai subdistrict municipalities (thesaban tambons) cover the whole subdistricts, Nong Prue subdistrict municipality covers parts of the same-named subdistrict.

Subdistrict municipality	Pop.	LAO code	website
Somdet Charoen	6,986	05711204	somdejcharoen.go.th
Nong Pla Lai	6,536	05711202	thnpl.go.th
Nong Prue	4,375	05711201	nongpruekan.go.th

==== Subdistrict administrative organization ====
The non-municipal areas are administered by one subdistrict administrative organization - SAO (ongkan borihan suan tambon - o bo toh).

Subdistrict adm.org - SAO	Pop.	LAO code	website
Nong Prue SAO	13,835	06711203	nongpruekansao.go.th

== Education ==
- 18 primary schools
- 2 secondary schools

== Healthcare ==
=== Hospitals ===
Nong Prue district is served by two hospitals

- Nong Prue Hospital with 30 beds.
- Phayaban Sathan Phra Barami Hospital with 30 beds.

=== Health promoting hospitals ===
In the district there are seven health-promoting hospitals in total.

1 Somdet Charoen	2 Nong Pla Lai	4 Nong Prue

== Religion ==
There are thirty-six Theravada Buddhist temples in the district.

5 Nong Pla Lai	7 Somdet Charoen	24 Nong Prue

The Christians have three churches.
