= Nong Ya Sai district =

Nong Ya Sai หนองหญ้าไซ
- District
- District location in Suphan Buri province
- Coordinates: 14°46′30″N 99°54′40″E
- Country: Thailand
- Province: Suphan Buri
- Seat: Nong Ya Sai

Area
  - Total: 420.2 km^{2} (162.2 sq mi)

Population (2013)
  - Total: 49,272
  - Density: 118.7/km^{2} (307/sq mi)
- Time zone: UTC+7 (ICT)
- Postal code: 72240
- Geocode: 7210

Nong Ya Sai (Thai: หนองหญ้าไซ, pronounced [nɔ̌ːŋ jâː sāj]) is a district (amphoe) in the western part of Suphan Buri province, central Thailand.

== History ==
The minor district (king amphoe) was created on 1 June 1983, when the four tambons Nong Ya Sai, Nong Rathawat, Nong Pho, and Chaeng Ngam were split off from Sam Chuk district. It was upgraded to a full district on 21 May 1990.

== Geography ==
Neighboring districts are (from the north clockwise) Dan Chang, Doem Bang Nang Buat, Sam Chuk, and Don Chedi of Suphan Buri Province, and Lao Khwan of Kanchanaburi province.

== Administration ==
=== Central administration ===
Nong Ya Sai is divided into six sub-districts (tambons), which are further subdivided into 66 administrative villages (mubans).

No.	Name	Thai	Villages	Pop.
1.	Nong Ya Sai	หนองหญ้าไซ	13	11,985
2.	Nong Ratchawat	หนองราชวัตร	8	5,120
3.	Nong Pho	หนองโพธิ์	14	6,748
4.	Chaeng Ngam	แจงงาม	8	6,473
5.	Nong Kham	หนองขาม	11	8,981
6.	Thap Luang	ทัพหลวง	12	9,965

=== Local administration ===
There is one sub-district municipality (thesaban tambon) in the district:

- Nong Ya Sai (Thai: เทศบาลตำบลหนองหญ้าไซ) consisting of parts of sub-district Nong Ya Sai.

There are six sub-district administrative organizations (SAO) in the district:

- Nong Ya Sai (Thai: องค์การบริหารส่วนตำบลหนองหญ้าไซ) consisting of parts of sub-district Nong Ya Sai.
- Nong Ratchawat (Thai: องค์การบริหารส่วนตำบลหนองราชวัตร) consisting of sub-district Nong Ratchawat.
- Nong Pho (Thai: องค์การบริหารส่วนตำบลหนองโพธิ์) consisting of sub-district Nong Pho.
- Chaeng Ngam (Thai: องค์การบริหารส่วนตำบลแจงงาม) consisting of sub-district Chaeng Ngam.
- Nong Kham (Thai: องค์การบริหารส่วนตำบลหนองขาม) consisting of sub-district Nong Kham.
- Thap Luang (Thai: องค์การบริหารส่วนตำบลทัพหลวง) consisting of sub-district Thap Luang.
