= P. A. Payutto =

Thai Buddhist monk and scholar (born 1938)

- ป.อ. ปยุตฺโต
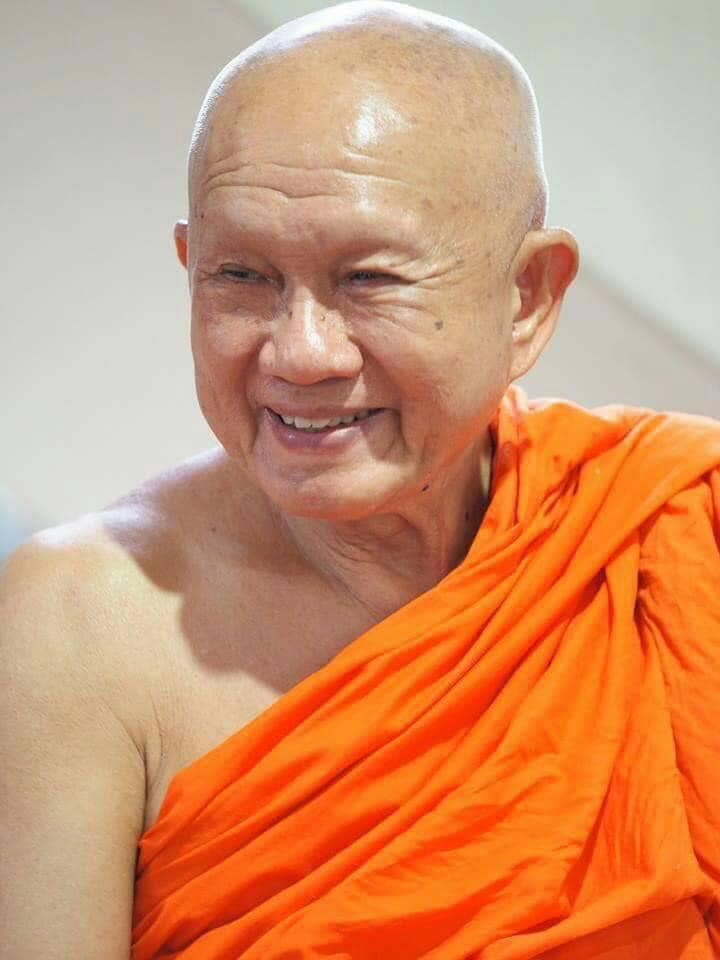

Personal life
- Born: Prayudh Aryankura ประยุทธ์ อารยางกูร; 12 January 1938 (age 88) Si Prachan district, Suphan Buri province, Thailand

Religious life
- Religion: Buddhism
- Order: Mahā Nikāya
- School: Theravāda
- Dharma name: Payutto ปยุตฺโต
- Monastic name: Somdet Phra Buddhaghosacariya สมเด็จพระพุทธโฆษาจารย์
- Ordination: 24 July 1961, aged 23; (64 years ago); Wat Phra Kaew

Senior posting
- Post: Abbot of Wat Nyanavesakavan (since 1994)

P. A. Payutto (Thai: ป.อ. ปยุตฺโต; born 12 January 1938), also known by his current monastic title, Somdet Phra Buddhaghosacariya (Thai: สมเด็จพระพุทธโฆษาจารย์), is a well-known Thai Buddhist monk, an intellectual, and a prolific writer.

Payutto has lectured and written extensively about a variety of topics related to Buddhism, including the position of women in Buddhism and the relationship between Buddhism and the environment. He was awarded the 1994 UNESCO Prize for Peace Education.

Because changes in Thai monastic title involve adding or changing monastic names, Payutto has been known by, and published under, a variety of different names over his career. Previously, he was known as Phra Rajavaramuni, Phra Debvedhi, Phra Dhammapitaka, and Phra Bhramagunabhorn. Upon his appointment to the Sangha Supreme Council in 2016, his current title is Somdet Phra Buddhaghosacariya.

== Early life ==
Payutto was born as the fifth child of Samran and Chunkee Aryankura on 12 January 1938 in Si Prachan district, Suphan Buri province, Thailand. Payutto received his early education in Suphan Buri. During his childhood, Payutto suffered a lot of illnesses, some of which involved him in surgeries and many have followed him until today. Poor health made it difficult for him to commit to school and formal education. Discouraged by his health, Payutto came back to Suphanburi after completing junior high school at Pathum Khongkha School in Bangkok in 1950. Being assured that he could continue his education without having to get involved physically, as is the case in school, he entered the monastery, with the family's support, to seek religious education, being ordained as a novice (samanera) at the age of 13. He began the study of Pali and received training in Vipassanā. Under his father's encouragement, he moved to Wat Phra Piren in Bangkok and went on to achieve the highest-level (ninth-level) studies in the Pali language while still a samanera, for which he was granted a royal ordination ceremony into the monkhood at Wat Phra Kaew on 24 July 1961. He embraced the monastic name "Payutto", literally "a person with unrelenting efforts". Payutto received a bachelor's degree in Buddhist studies from Mahachulalongkornrajavidyalaya University in 1962.

== A scholarly monk ==
After securing instructor qualifications, Payutto was appointed Associate Dean of Mahachulalongkornrajavidyalaya University and had maintained this position for the following ten years. He played an important role in modernizing Sangha's education by relating knowledge in Buddhism to contemporary social issues. Payutto assumed the post of Deputy Abbot of Wat Phra Piren in 1973, but resigned three years later to dedicate himself to academic work. He published a number of books and articles, and regularly attended academic seminars and conferences, surrounding himself with contemporary scholars and intellectuals. He authored Buddhadhamma, recognized as a masterpiece among Buddhist scholars. He received honorary degrees from more than ten universities, both domestic and foreign. When he received UNESCO's Prize for Peace Education, he donated all the funds received to the Ministry of Education of Thailand for the establishing of Phra Dhampitaka Education for Peace Foundation.

Payutto is currently serving as Abbot of Nyanavesakavan Temple (Wat Nyanavesakavan), located in Tambon Bang Krathuek, Amphoe Sam Phran, Nakhon Pathom Province.

== Defending the Pali Canon ==
Payutto strongly believes in strict interpretation of Pali Canon, very much in line with the Theravada tradition. He went public in many occasions in defense of the Pali Canon whenever its integrity was challenged. For example, in the mid-1990s, Payutto published a book called The Case of Dhammakaya (Thai: กรณีธรรมกาย), in which he discussed the controversy related to the concepts dhammakaya and Nibbana as interpreted by the Dhammakaya Movement. Payutto reviewed the essence of the Pali Canon, cited Pali texts he believed were misinterpreted by the temple, and came up with counterarguments in the context of the Pali Canon. He argued that the term Dhammakaya was not correctly interpreted, and claimed that if the temple continued to uphold false interpretations, it could not do so any longer under the umbrella of Theravada Buddhism.

Wat Phra Dhammakaya replied in several ways. One assistant-abbot of the temple, Luang phi Thanavuddho, wrote an essay in which he defended the temple's views. He compared discussing the nature of Nirvana with the well-known metaphor of blind people feeling an elephant and getting in a fight about what it is they are feeling. This metaphor is also mentioned in the Pali Canon. He also referred to interpretations of Pali scholars C.A.F. Rhys Davids and I.B. Horner, but Payutto dismissed these as incorrect.

== Achievements ==
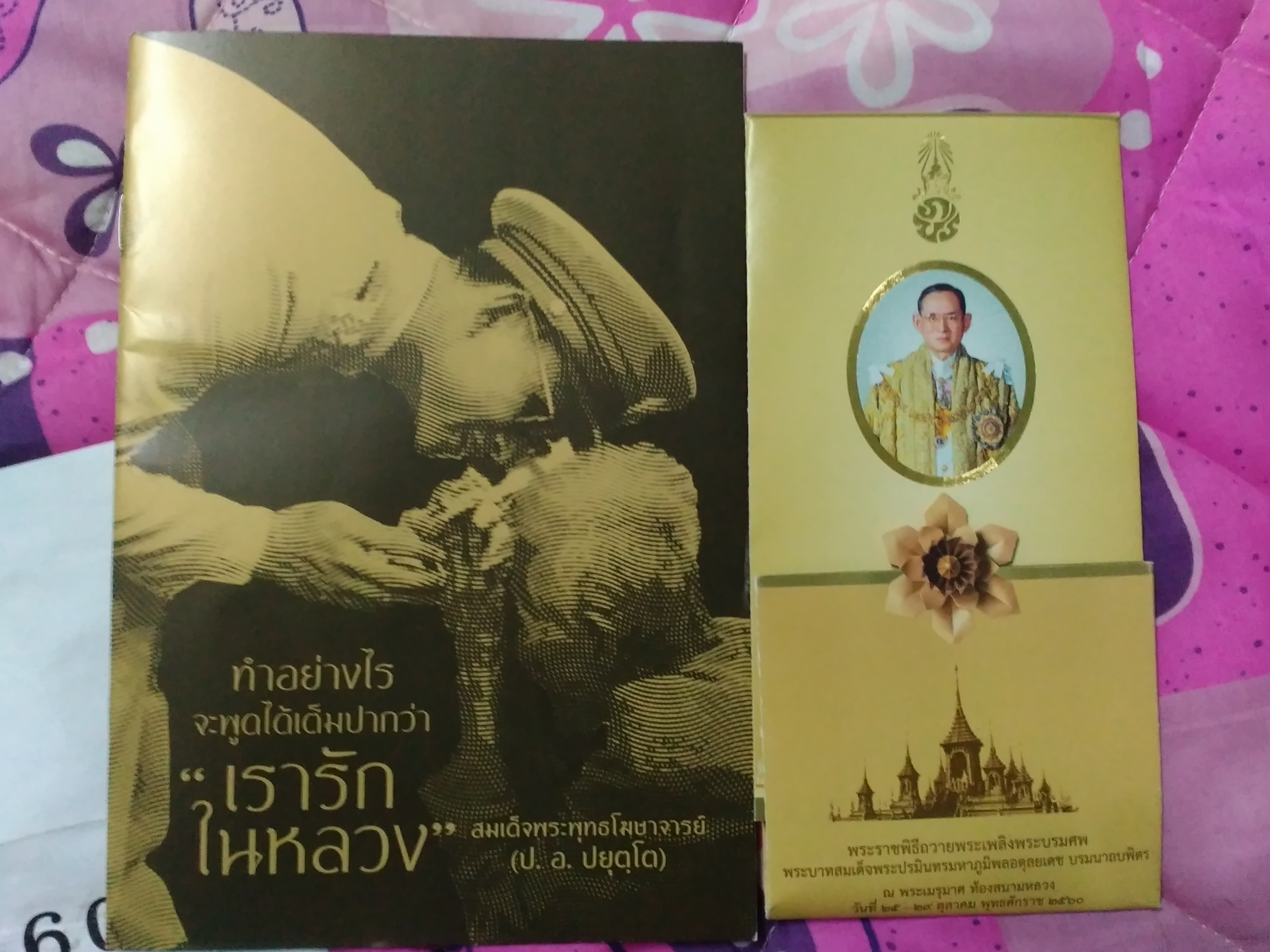
A book written by P. A. Payutto, published as a souvernir book for the Funeral of HM King Bhumibol Adulyadej in 2017.

Payutto has published a number of books that examine contemporary social issues, such as abortion, from a viewpoint of Buddhism. He regularly expresses Buddhist viewpoints on areas as diverse as education, law, social sciences and natural sciences. Payutto stresses the Buddhist approach of middle path as the inevitable way to achieve peace and sustainable development. He argues that Buddhism is the eventual aggregation of natural laws and that it forms a basis of modern sciences. Payutto also points to Buddhism as the indispensable path to happiness.

== International awards and recognitions ==
- 1994 UNESCO Prize for Peace Education
- 1995 Appointed to a post of Tipitaka Acharaya, as a scholar well versed in the Pali Canon, by Nava Nalanda Institute
- 2005 Awarded the Most Eminent Scholar as a guru of Theravada Buddhism by The World Buddhist University
