= Sam Chuk district =

Sam Chuk สามชุก
- District
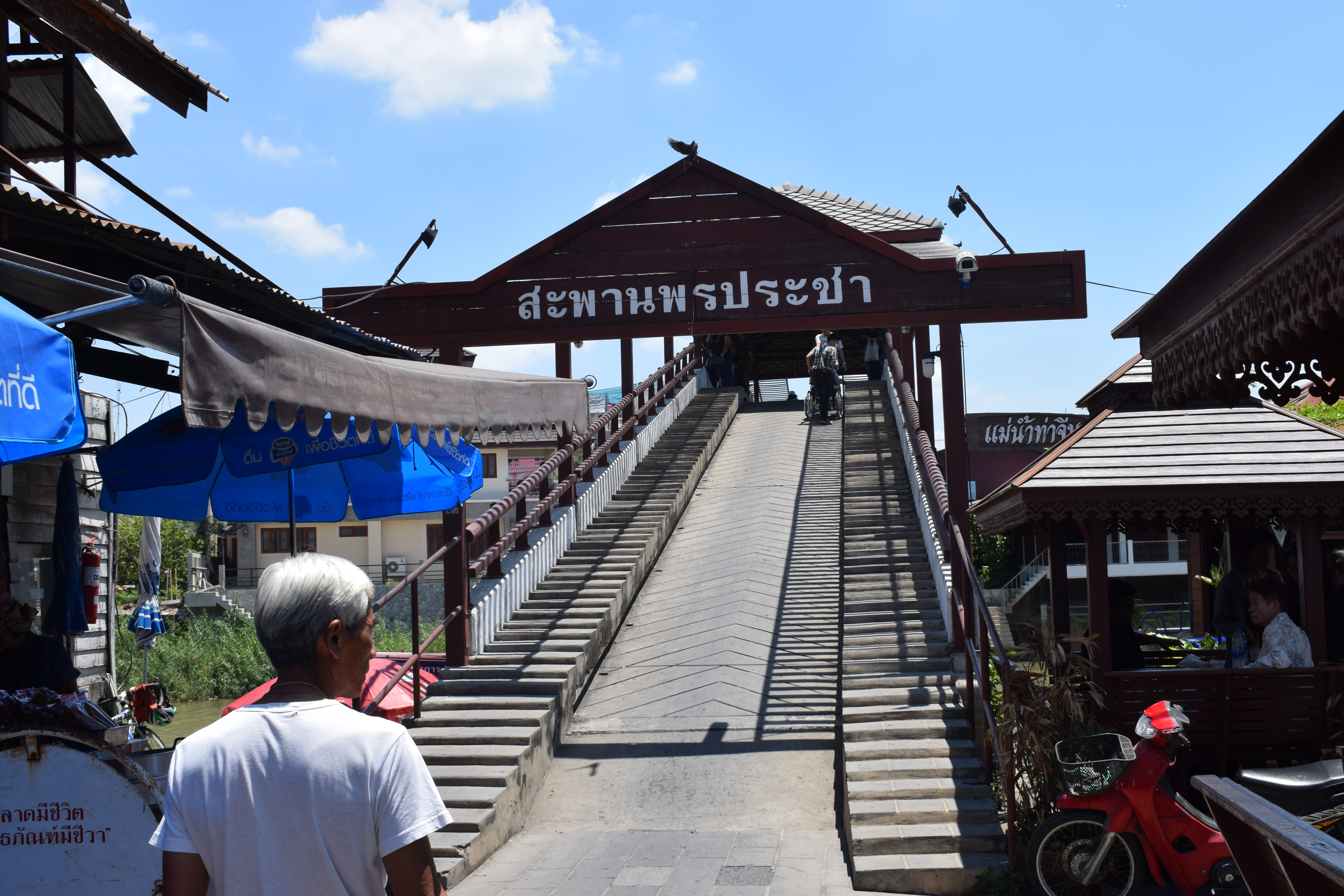
- Pornpracha Bridge, the bridge over Tha Chin River (locally known as Suphan River) and lead to Sam Chuk Market

- District location in Suphan Buri province
- Coordinates: 14°45′19″N 100°5′41″E
- Country: Thailand
- Province: Suphan Buri
- Seat: Sam Chuk

Area
  - Total: 355.9 km^{2} (137.4 sq mi)

Population (2013)
  - Total: 54,950
  - Density: 163.6/km^{2} (424/sq mi)
- Time zone: UTC+7 (ICT)
- Postal code: 72130
- Geocode: 7208

Sam Chuk (Thai: สามชุก, pronounced [sǎːm t͡ɕʰúk]) is a district (amphoe) in the northern part of Suphan Buri province, central Thailand.

== History ==
Originally the district name was Nang Buat. In 1911 when the government separated part of Nang Buat District and established Doem Bang district, it also moved the district office to Ban Sam Pheng, Tambon Sam Chuk. In 1939 the district name was changed to Sam Chuk as the central tambon.

== Geography ==
Neighbouring districts are (from the south clockwise): Si Prachan, Don Chedi, Nong Ya Sai and Doem Bang Nang Buat of Suphan Buri Province, and Sawaeng Ha of Ang Thong province.

The main water resource of Sam Chuk is the Tha Chin River or Suphan river.

== Economy ==
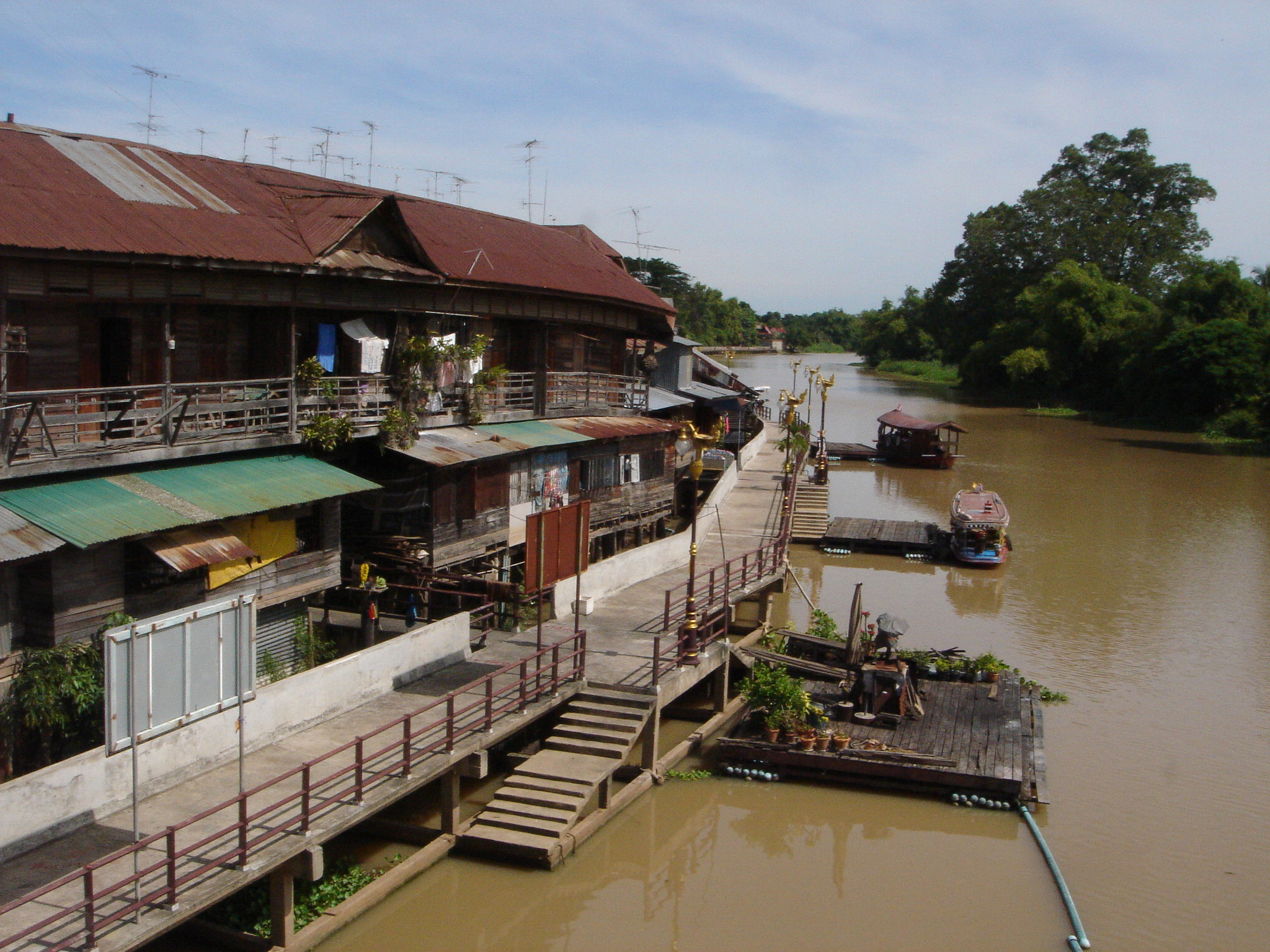
Sam Chuk Market is on the banks of the Tha Chin River

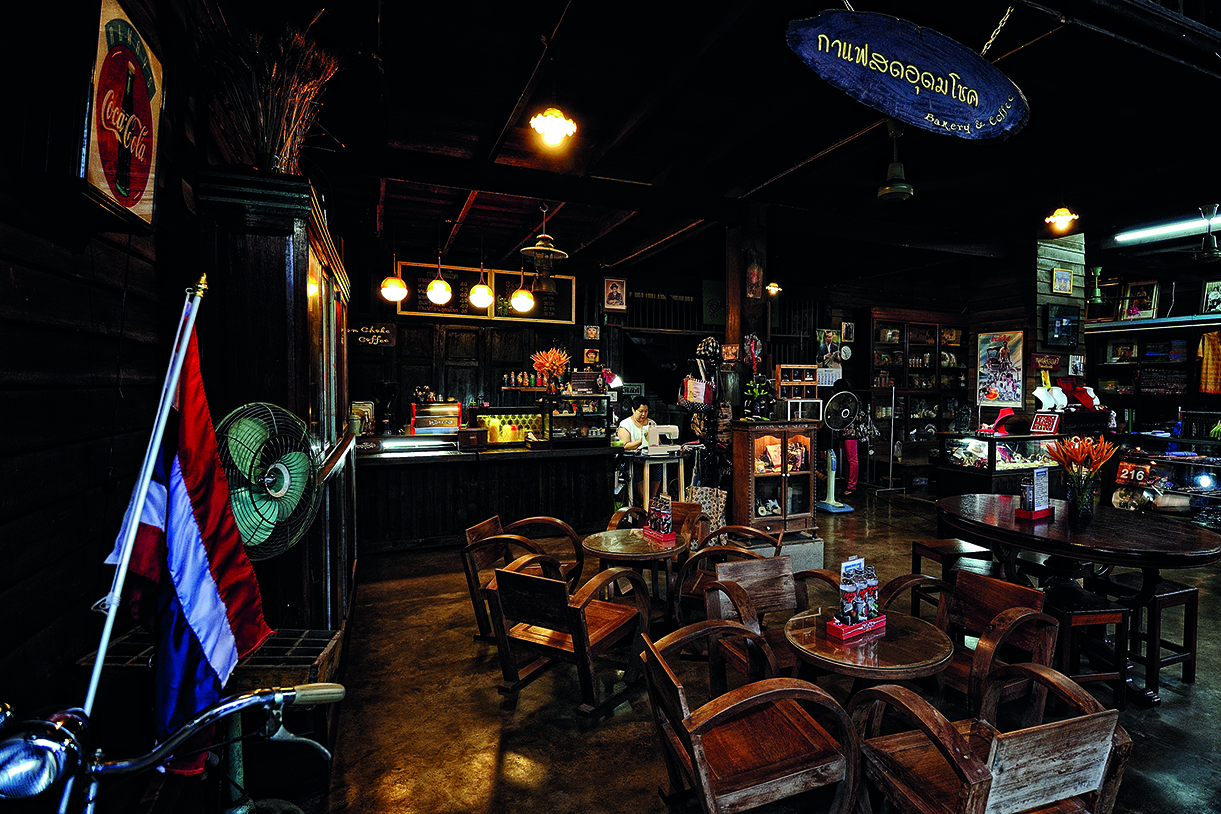
A coffee shop inside the market building

Thailand's Sam Chuk community and Old Market District along the Tha Chin River was granted an Award of Merit in the 2009 United Nations Educational, Scientific and Cultural Organization (UNESCO) Asia-Pacific Heritage Awards for Culture Heritage Conservation. Local residents formed a Sam Chuk Market Conservation Committee. They preserved what they received from their ancestors and restored 19 local buildings, adapting the old style architecture described in Thai as khanompang khing ('ginger bread') style, into a contemporary market.

== Administration ==
=== Central administration ===
Sam Chuk is divided into seven sub-districts (tambons), which are further subdivided into 68 administrative villages (mubans).

No.	Name	Thai	Villages	Pop.
1.	Yan Yao	ย่านยาว	9	8,140
2.	Wang Luek	วังลึก	15	12,366
3.	Sam Chuk	สามชุก	6	10,783
4.	Nong Phak Nak	หนองผักนาก	8	8,443
5.	Ban Sa	บ้านสระ	10	5,915
6.	Nong Sadao	หนองสะเดา	10	5,132
7.	Krasiao	กระเสียว	10	4,171

=== Local administration ===
There is one sub-district municipality (thesaban tambon) in the district:

- Sam Chuk (Thai: เทศบาลตำบลสามชุก) consisting of sub-district Sam Chuk and parts of sub-districts Yan Yao and Krasiao.

There are six sub-district administrative organizations (SAO) in the district:

- Yan Yao (Thai: องค์การบริหารส่วนตำบลย่านยาว) consisting of parts of sub-district Yan Yao.
- Wang Luek (Thai: องค์การบริหารส่วนตำบลวังลึก) consisting of sub-district Wang Luek.
- Nong Phak Nak (Thai: องค์การบริหารส่วนตำบลหนองผักนาก) consisting of sub-district Nong Phak Nak.
- Ban Sa (Thai: องค์การบริหารส่วนตำบลบ้านสระ) consisting of sub-district Ban Sa.
- Nong Sadao (Thai: องค์การบริหารส่วนตำบลหนองสะเดา) consisting of sub-district Nong Sadao.
- Krasiao (Thai: องค์การบริหารส่วนตำบลกระเสียว) consisting of parts of sub-district Krasiao.

== In media ==
Sam Chuk was cited in the 2009 same name Thai film as a backdrop of whole story and a location for filming. The film is based on the true story that happened here about a group of boy students who are involved in drugs, directed by Tanit Jitnukul.
