= Phanom Thuan district =

Phanom Thuan พนมทวน
- District
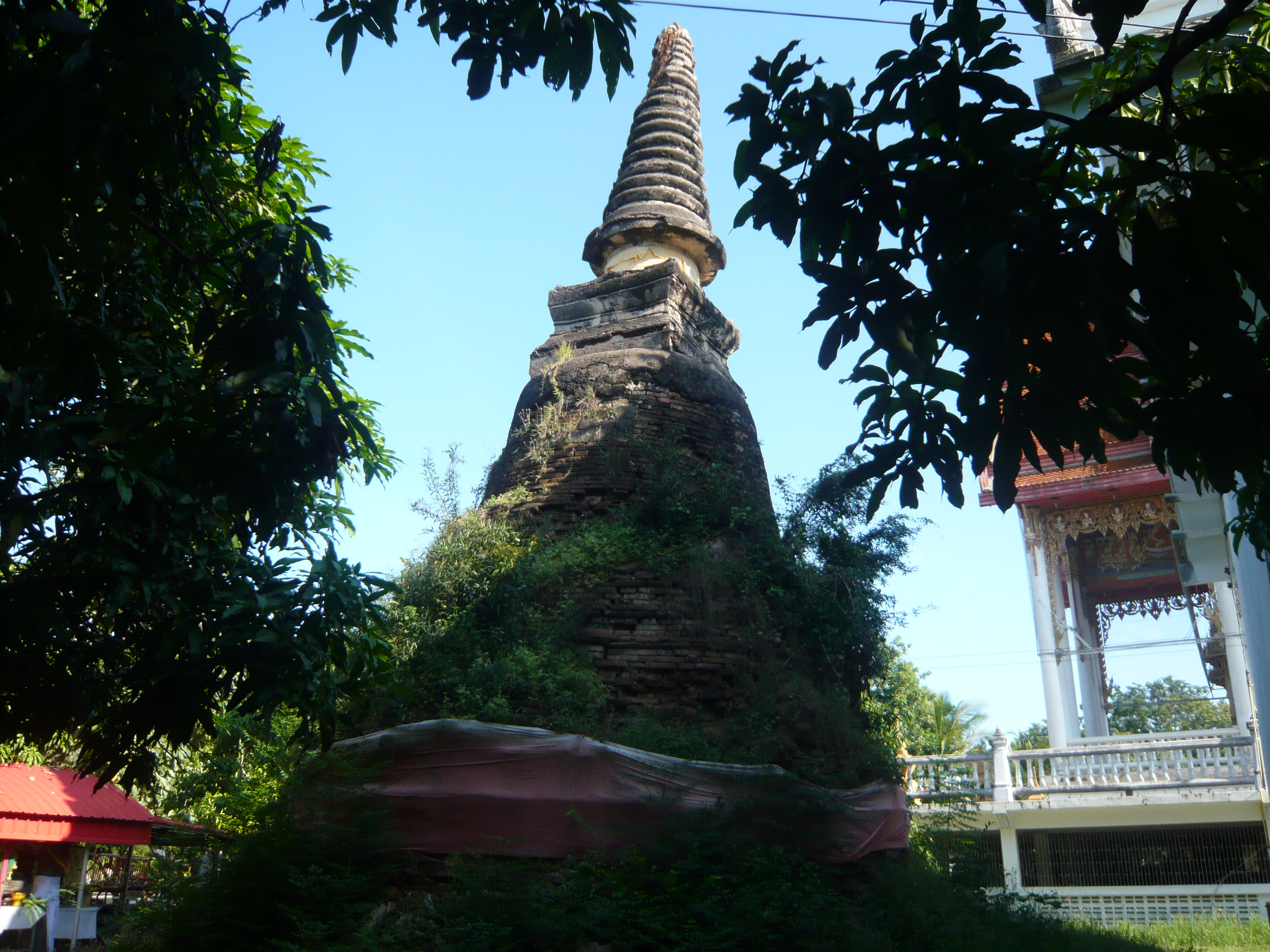
- Wat Ban Thuan, tambon Phanom Thuan

- District location in Kanchanaburi province
- Coordinates: 14°7′49″N 99°41′56″E
- Country: Thailand
- Province: Kanchanaburi
- Seat: Phanom Thuan

Area
  - Total: 536 km^{2} (207 sq mi)

Population (2024)
  - Total: 52,319
  - Density: 98/km^{2} (250/sq mi)
- Time zone: UTC+7 (ICT)
- Postal code: 71140 + 71170
- Calling code: 034
- ISO 3166 code: TH-7109

Phanom Thuan (Thai: พนมทวน, pronounced [pʰā.nōm tʰūa̯n]) is a district (amphoe) in the eastern part of Kanchanaburi province, western central Thailand.

== History ==
The area of Phanom Thuan was occupied in prehistoric times. At the archaeological site of Ban Don Ta Phet many artifacts were found in a 4th century cemetery, which indicated trade relations with India, Vietnam, and the Philippines.

At the Don Chedi archaeological site an excavation by the Fine Arts Department in 1982 recovered many human skeletons as well as elephant bones and swords. Thus this site might even have been the location of the famous battle of King Naresuan against the Burmese crown-prince, most commonly assigned to the Don Chedi district nearby.

Phanom Thuan district was one of the first three districts of Kanchanaburi Province. It was at first named Nuea ('northern') district as it covered the northern part of the province. When in 1831 King Rama III relocated the center of Kanchanaburi and readjusted its extent, Nuea district was renamed to Ban Thuan, covering the mountainous areas and the northward flowing river. In 1939 the district name was changed to Phanom Thuan.

== Toponymy ==
The name "Phanom Thuan" comes from a local waterway, Khlong Thuan or Maenam Thuan, a minor branch of the Mae Klong River which separates from the Mae Klong at Tha Muang district, near the Mae Klong Dam. It then flows upstream (hence the name "Phanom Thuan," which means "upstream watercourse") until it finally converges with Khlong Chorakhe Sam Phan, a branch of the Tha Chin River. Meanwhile, "Phanom" is a borrowed word from the Khmer "ភ្នំ," meaning "mountain."

== Geography ==
Neighbouring districts are (from the south clockwise) Tha Maka, Tha Muang, Mueang Kanchana Buri, Bo Phloi, Huai Krachao of Kanchanaburi Province, U Thong and Song Phi Nong of Suphanburi province.

== Administration ==
=== Provincial administration ===
The district is divided into eight subdistricts (tambons), which are further subdivided into 103 administrative villages (mubans).

No.	Subdistrict	Thai	Villages	Pop.
1.	Phanom Thuan	พนมทวน	9	7,354
2.	Nong Rong	หนองโรง	17	6,776
3.	Thung Samo	ทุ่งสมอ	4	2,971
4.	Don Chedi	ดอนเจดีย์	8	4,881
5.	Phang Tru	พังตรุ	20	9,402
6.	Rang Wai	รางหวาย	23	11,154
11.	Nong Sarai	หนองสาหร่าย	9	3,667
12.	Don Ta Phet	ดอนตาเพชร	13	6,114
		Total	103	52,319

Missing numbers now form Huai Krachao district.

=== Local government ===
==== Municipalities ====
As of December 2024 there are five municipal (thesaban) areas in the district: Nong Sarai and Don Chedi subdistrict municipalities (thesaban tambons) consist of the whole subdistricts Nong Sarai and Don Chedi, Phanom Thuan subdistrict municipality covers parts of subdistrict Phanom Tuan, Rang Wai and Talat Khet subdistrict municipalities cover the entire subdistrict Rang Wai.

Subdistrict municipality	Pop.	LAO code	website
Rang Wai	7,169	05710904	rangwai.go.th
Phanom Thuan	5,082	05710901	
Don Chedi	4,881	05710909	donchedi.go.th
Nong Sarai	3,667	05710903	nongsarai.go.th

Talat Khet subdistrict mun.	Pop.	05710902	talatkhet.go.th
Rang Wai	3,985		

==== Subdistrict administrative organizations ====
The non-municipal areas are administered by five subdistrict administrative organizations - SAO (ongkan borihan suan tambon - o bo toh).

Subdistrict adm.org - SAO	Pop.	LAO code	website
Phang Tru SAO	9,402	06710907	phangtru.go.th
Nong Rong SAO	6,776	06710908	nhongrong.go.th
Don Ta Phet SAO	6,114	06710906	dontaphet.go.th
Thung Samo SAO	2,971	06710910	thungsamorkan.go.th
Phanom Thuan SAO	2,272	06710905	phanomthuan.go.th

== Education ==
- 28 primary schools
- 3 secondary schools

== Healthcare ==
=== Hospitals ===
Phanom Thua district is served by one hospital

- Chao Khun Phaibun Phanom Thuan Hospital with 59 beds.

=== Health promoting hospitals ===
In the district there are nine health-promoting hospitals in total.

1 Don Chedi	1 Don Ta Phet	1 Nong Rong	1 Nong Sarai
1 Thung Samo	2 Phang Tru	2 Rang Wai

== Religion ==
There are forty Theravada Buddhist temples in the district.

1 Thung Samo	1 Don Ta Phet	5 Don Chedi	7 Nong Rong
7 Phang Tru	8 Phanom Thuan	11 Rang Wai

The Christians have one church.

== Economy ==
Phanom Thuan covers an area of approximately 200,000 rais (535.78 km^{2}), of which 45% is agricultural land. Residents have a career in raising livestock such as beef cattle, etc.
