= U Thong district =

U Thong อู่ทอง
- District
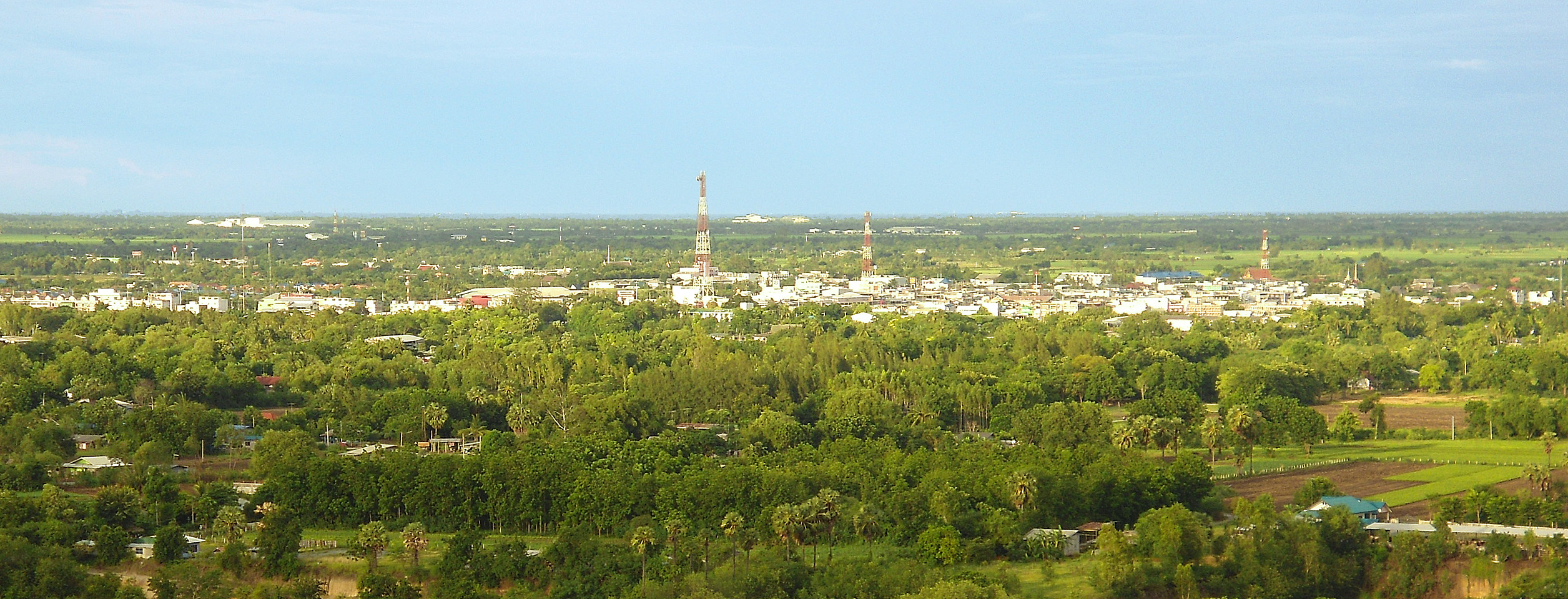
- View of U Thong

- District location in Suphan Buri province
- Coordinates: 14°22′32″N 99°53′32″E
- Country: Thailand
- Province: Suphan Buri

Area
  - Total: 630.29 km^{2} (243.36 sq mi)

Population (2013)
  - Total: 121,421
- Time zone: UTC+7 (ICT)
- Postal code: 72160
- Geocode: 7209

U Thong (Thai: อู่ทอง, pronounced [ʔùː tʰɔ̄ːŋ]) is a district (amphoe) in the western part of Suphan Buri province, north of Bangkok. The ancient city of U Thong lies within it and was occupied for many centuries before the Dvaravati period. The district was created in 1905 as Chorakhe Sam Phan, renamed U Thong in 1939, and its office was moved to the ancient city in 1944.

== History ==
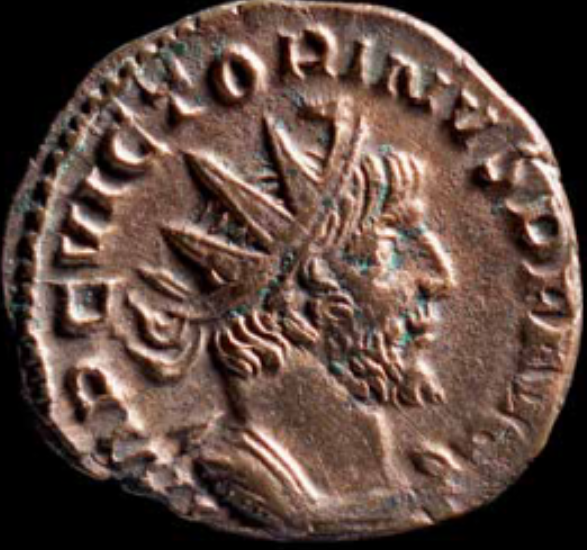
Bronze double denarius of the Gallic Roman emperor Victorinus (269–271 CE), discovered in the U Thong archaeological area and now housed in the U Thong National Museum.

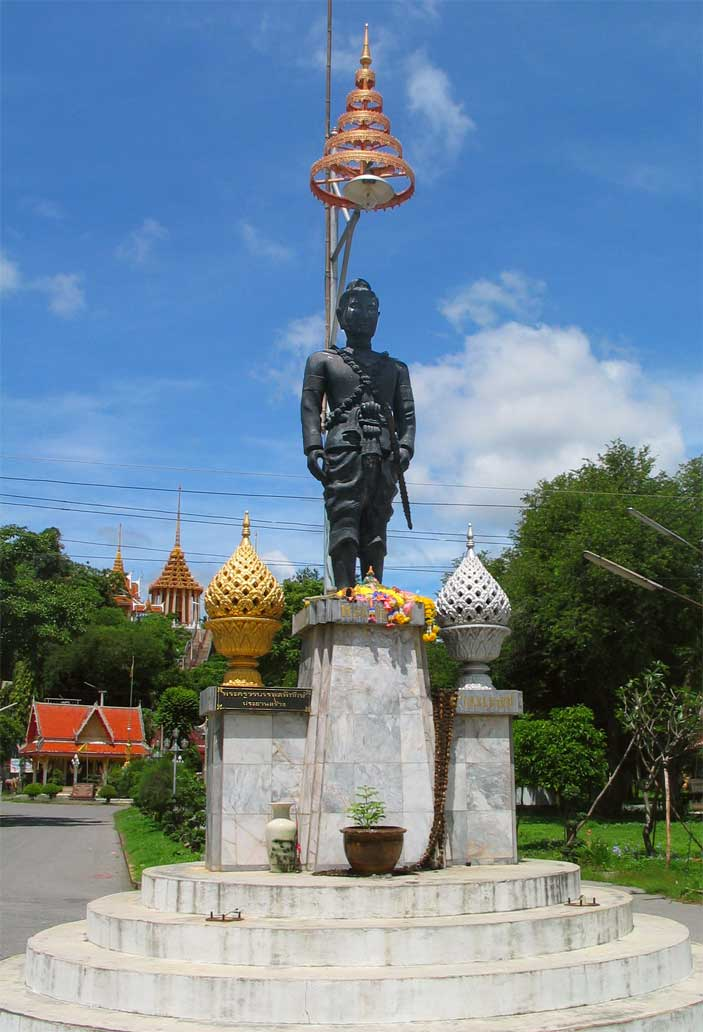
Statue of Phra Chao U-Thong (founder of Ayutthaya) in Amphoe U Thong, Suphan Buri Province.

Charles Higham reports that U Thong was occupied for many centuries before the Dvaravati state developed, and that radiocarbon determinations from U Thong and Chansen place the transition to complex state societies in the Chao Phraya basin between about 300 and 600 AD. A copper inscription of the mid-7th century reads, "Sri Harshavarman, grandson of Ishanavarman, having expanded his sphere of glory, obtained the lion throne through regular succession", and mentions gifts to a linga. The site includes a moat, 1,690 by 840 m, and the Pra Paton caitya. Brick collected at the ancient city is about 28 by 14 by 8 cm, was tempered with rice chaff or rice husk ash, and was made from deposits laid down by a fast river.

Damrong Rajanubhab recorded a local tradition that Ramathibodi, the first king of the Ayutthaya Kingdom, ruled at U Thong until an epidemic emptied the town, and that he then moved east and founded his new capital.

U Thong district was created with the name Chorakhe Sam Phan in 1905. In 1939 the district was renamed U Thong. In 1944, the government moved the centre of the district from Ban Chorakhe Sam Phan to the area of the ancient city.

== Geography ==
Neighbouring districts are (from the north clockwise): Don Chedi, Mueang Suphan Buri, Bang Pla Ma, Song Phi Nong of Suphan Buri province; Lao Khwan, Huai Krachao, and Phanom Thuan of Kanchanaburi province. The ancient city of U Thong stands on the west bank of the Chorakhe Sam Phan, about 30 km from the town of Suphan Buri.

== Administration ==
=== Central administration ===
U Thong district is divided into 13 sub-districts (tambons), which are further subdivided into 154 administrative villages (mubans).

No.	Name	Thai	Villages	Pop.
1.	U Thong	อู่ทอง	11	23,868
2.	Sa Yai Som	สระยายโสม	10	8,352
3.	Chorakhe Sam Phan	จรเข้สามพัน	15	13,105
4.	Ban Don	บ้านดอน	9	7,710
5.	Yung Thalai	ยุ้งทะลาย	7	4,497
6.	Don Makluea	ดอนมะเกลือ	12	4,548
7.	Nong Ong	หนองโอ่ง	14	9,859
8.	Don Kha	ดอนคา	20	13,245
9.	Phlapphla Chai	พลับพลาไชย	14	11,854
10.	Ban Khong	บ้านโข้ง	14	8,855
11.	Chedi	เจดีย์	8	3,076
12.	Sa Phang Lan	สระพังลาน	10	5,203
13.	Krachan	กระจัน	10	7,249

=== Local administration ===
There are nine sub-district municipalities (thesaban tambons) in the district:

- Chorakhe Sam Phan (Thai: เทศบาลตำบลจรเข้สามพัน) consists of sub-district Chorakhe Sam Phan.
- Chedi (Thai: เทศบาลตำบลเจดีย์) consists of sub-district Chedi.
- Sa Yai Som (Thai: เทศบาลตำบลสระยายโสม) consists of parts of the sub-district Sa Yai Som.
- U Thong (Thai: เทศบาลตำบลอู่ทอง) consists of parts of the sub-district U Thong.
- Khun Phat Pheng (Thai: เทศบาลตำบลขุนพัดเพ็ง) consists of parts of the sub-district Sa Yai Som.
- Ban Don (Thai: เทศบาลตำบลบ้านดอน) consists of sub-district Ban Don.
- Ban Khong (Thai: เทศบาลตำบลบ้านโข้ง) consists of sub-district Ban Khong.
- Krachan (Thai: เทศบาลตำบลกระจัน) consists of sub-district Krachan.
- Thao U Thong (Thai: เทศบาลตำบลท้าวอู่ทอง) consists of parts of sub-district U Thong.

There are six sub-district administrative organizations (SAO) in the district:

- Yung Thalai (Thai: องค์การบริหารส่วนตำบลยุ้งทะลาย) consists of sub-district Yung Thalai.
- Don Makluea (Thai: องค์การบริหารส่วนตำบลดอนมะเกลือ) consists of sub-district Don Makluea.
- Nong Ong (Thai: องค์การบริหารส่วนตำบลหนองโอ่ง) consists of sub-district Nong Ong.
- Don Kha (Thai: องค์การบริหารส่วนตำบลดอนคา) consists of sub-district Don Kha.
- Phlapphla Chai (Thai: องค์การบริหารส่วนตำบลพลับพลาไชย) consists of sub-district Phlapphla Chai.
- Sa Phang Lan (Thai: องค์การบริหารส่วนตำบลสระพังลาน) consists of sub-district Sa Phang Lan.
