= Dan Chang district =

Dan Chang ด่านช้าง
- District
- District location in Suphan Buri province
- Coordinates: 14°50′30″N 99°41′50″E
- Country: Thailand
- Province: Suphan Buri

Area
  - Total: 1,193.6 km^{2} (460.9 sq mi)

Population (2013)
  - Total: 67,011
  - Density: 54/km^{2} (140/sq mi)
- Time zone: UTC+7 (ICT)
- Postal code: 72180
- Geocode: 7203

Dan Chang (Thai: ด่านช้าง, pronounced [dàːn t͡ɕʰáːŋ]) is the northwesternmost district (amphoe) of Suphan Buri province, central Thailand.

== History ==
Dan Chang was created as a minor district (king amphoe) on 30 August 1974 by splitting off three tambons, Dan Chang, Ong Phra, and Huai Khamin, from Doem Bang Nang Buat district. The next year, subdistrict Nong Makha Mong was transferred from Doem Bang Nang Buat to the minor district. The minor district was upgraded to a full district on 13 July 1981.

Lauda Air Flight 004 crashed at a site three nautical miles north of Phu Toei, Huai Khamin, Dan Chang in 1991.

== Geography ==
Neighboring districts are (from the north clockwise): Ban Rai of Uthai Thani province; Noen Kham of Chainat province; Doem Bang Nang Buat and Nong Ya Sai of Suphan Buri Province; and Lao Khwan, Nong Prue, and Si Sawat of Kanchanaburi province.

Phu Toei National Park is in Dan Chang District. The important water resource of Dan Chang is the Krasiao River which is impounded by the district's Krasiao Dam in Huai Khamin Subdistrict.

== Administration ==
=== Central administration ===
Dan Chang is divided into seven subdistricts (tambons), which are further subdivided into 93 administrative villages (mubans).

No.	Name	Thai	Villages	Pop.
1.	Nong Makha Mong	หนองมะค่าโมง	21	17,782
2.	Dan Chang	ด่านช้าง	21	16,007
3.	Huai Khamin	ห้วยขมิ้น	16	9,259
4.	Ong Phra	องค์พระ	9	7,133
5.	Wang Khan	วังคัน	11	6,531
6.	Nikhom Krasiao	นิคมกระเสียว	6	5,346
7.	Wang Yao	วังยาว	9	4,953

=== Local administration ===
There is one subdistrict municipality (thesaban tambon) in the district:

- Dan Chang (Thai: เทศบาลตำบลด่านช้าง) consisting of parts of subdistricts Nong Makha Mong and Dan Chang.

There are seven subdistrict administrative organizations (SAO) in the district:

- Nong Makha Mong (Thai: องค์การบริหารส่วนตำบลหนองมะค่าโมง) consisting of parts of subdistrict Nong Makha Mong.
- Dan Chang (Thai: องค์การบริหารส่วนตำบลด่านช้าง) consisting of parts of subdistrict Dan Chang.
- Huai Khamin (Thai: องค์การบริหารส่วนตำบลห้วยขมิ้น) consisting of subdistrict Huai Khamin.
- Ong Phra (Thai: องค์การบริหารส่วนตำบลองค์พระ) consisting of subdistrict Ong Phra.
- Wang Khan (Thai: องค์การบริหารส่วนตำบลวังคัน) consisting of subdistrict Wang Khan.
- Nikhom Krasiao (Thai: องค์การบริหารส่วนตำบลนิคมกระเสียว) consisting of subdistrict Nikhom Krasiao.
- Wang Yao (Thai: องค์การบริหารส่วนตำบลวังยาว) consisting of subdistrict Wang Yao.
