= Bo Phloi district =

Bo Phloi บ่อพลอย
- District
- District location in Kanchanaburi province
- Coordinates: 14°19′33″N 99°30′52″E
- Country: Thailand
- Province: Kanchanaburi
- District: Bo Phloi

Area
  - Total: 967 km^{2} (373 sq mi)

Population (2024)
  - Total: 57,176
  - Density: 59/km^{2} (150/sq mi)
- Time zone: UTC+7 (ICT)
- Postal code: 71160 + 71220
- Calling code: 034
- ISO 3166 code: TH-7103

Bo Phloi (Thai: บ่อพลอย, pronounced [bɔ̀ː pʰlɔ̄ːj]) is a district (amphoe) of Kanchanaburi province, western Thailand and is located northwest of Bangkok.

== History ==
The minor district (king amphoe) Bo Phloi was created by splitting off some parts of Mueang Kanchanaburi district. It was upgraded to a full district on 16 July 1963.

== Geography ==
Neighboring districts are (from the south clockwise) Tha Muang, Mueang Kanchanaburi, Si Sawat, Nong Prue, Lao Khwan, Huai Krachao, and Phanom Thuan of Kanchanaburi Province.

== Administration ==
=== Provincial administration ===
The district is divided into six subdistricts (tambons), which are further subdivided into 80 administrative villages (mubans).

No.	Subdistrict	Thai	Villages	Pop.
1.	Bo Phloi	บ่อพลอย	12	13,347
2.	Nong Kum	หนองกุ่ม	16	14,647
3.	Nong Ri	หนองรี	10	6,661
5.	Lum Rang	หลุมรัง	18	9,197
8.	Chong Dan	ช่องด่าน	15	8,530
9.	Nong Krang	หนองกร่าง	9	4,794
		Total	80	57,176

Missing subdistrict-numbers are part of Nong Prue district.

=== Local government ===
==== Municipalities ====
As of December 2024 there are: two municipal (thesaban) areas in the district: Bo Phloi subdistrict municipality (thesaban tambon) consists of parts of the subdistricts Bo Phloi and Chong Dan, Nong Ri subdistrict municipality covers parts of Nong Ri subdistrict.

Subdistrict municipality	Pop.	LAO code	website
Nong Ri	2,155	05710302	nongri.go.th/public

Bo Phloi subdistrict mun.	Pop.	05710301	bophloi.go.th
Bo Phloi	6,073		
Chong Dan	619		
Total	6,692		

==== Subdistrict administrative organizations ====
The non-municipal areas are administered by six subdistrict administrative organizations - SAO (ongkan borihan suan tambon - o bo toh).

Subdistrict adm.org - SAO	Pop.	LAO code	website
Nong Kum SAO	14,647	06710305	thasao-tmk.go.th
Lum Rang SAO	9,197	06710308	wangkrachae.go.th
Chong Dan SAO	7,911	06710303	loomsoom.go.th
Bo Phloi SAO	7,274	06710304	srimongkol.go.th
Nong Krang SAO	4,794	06710306	bongti.go.th
Nong Ri SAO	4,506	06710307	singsaiyok.go.th

== Education ==
- 32 primary schools
- 3 secondary schools
- Ramkhamhaeng University Kanchanaburi Campus.www.ru.ac.th

== Healthcare ==
=== Hospital ===
Bo Phloi district is served by one hospital

- Bo Phloi Hospital with 60 beds.

=== Health promoting hospitals ===
In the district there are ten health-promoting hospitals in total, of which;

1 Nong Krang	2 Chong Dan	2 Lum Rang
2 Nong Ri	3 Nong Kum

== Religion ==
There are forty-three Theravada Buddhist temples in the district.

2 Nong Krang	4 Chong Dan	6 Lum Rang
9 Nong Ri	10 Bo Phloi	12 Nong Kum

The Christians have one church.
