= Si Prachan district =

Si Prachan ศรีประจันต์
- District
- District location in Suphan Buri province
- Coordinates: 14°37′11″N 100°8′40″E
- Country: Thailand
- Province: Suphan Buri
- Subdistricts: 9
- Mubans: 64

Area
  - Total: 181.0 km^{2} (69.9 sq mi)

Population (2013)
  - Total: 62,419
  - Density: 359.1/km^{2} (930/sq mi)
- Time zone: UTC+7 (ICT)
- Postal code: 72140
- Geocode: 7205

Si Prachan (Thai: ศรีประจันต์, pronounced [sǐː prā.t͡ɕān]) is a district (amphoe) in the eastern part of Suphan Buri province, central Thailand. Si Prachan is well known for being the location of the Thai Buffalo Conservation Village, buffalo conservation centre.

== History ==
The government separated some parts of Tha Phi Liang District (now Mueang Suphan Buri) and Sam Chuk district to create Si Prachan District in 1901.

Si Prachan, formerly known as "Kraphung" (กระพุ้ง, pronounced [krā.pʰūŋ]). It was renamed in 1937 in honour of Khun Si Prachanraksa (Sam Mithongkham), the first Si Prachan subdistrict headman.

== Geography ==
Neighbouring districts are (from the south clockwise): Mueang Suphan Buri, Don Chedi and Sam Chuk; and Sawaeng Ha, Pho Thong, Samko and Wiset Chai Chan of Ang Thong province.

The main water resource of the district is the Tha Chin River.

== Administration ==
=== Central administration ===
Si Prachan is divided into nine subdistricts (tambons), which are further subdivided into 64 administrative villages (mubans).

No.	Name	Thai	Villages	Pop.
1.	Si Prachan	ศรีประจันต์	6	8,607
2.	Ban Krang	บ้านกร่าง	6	8,334
3.	Mot Daeng	มดแดง	7	5,412
4.	Bang Ngam	บางงาม	6	3,382
5.	Don Pru	ดอนปรู	9	9,210
6.	Plai Na	ปลายนา	7	8,329
7.	Wang Wa	วังหว้า	7	5,382
8.	Wang Nam Sap	วังน้ำซับ	7	6,761
9.	Wang Yang	วังยาง	9	7,002

=== Local administration ===
There are six subdistrict municipalities (thesaban tambons) in the district:

- Ban Krang (Thai: เทศบาลตำบลบ้านกร่าง) consisting of parts of subdistrict Ban Krang.
- Wang Wa (Thai: เทศบาลตำบลวังหว้า) consisting of subdistrict Wang Wa.
- Wang Nam Sap (Thai: เทศบาลตำบลวังน้ำซับ) consisting of subdistrict Wang Nam Sap.
- Si Prachan (Thai: เทศบาลตำบลศรีประจันต์) consisting of parts of subdistricts Si Prachan, Ban Krang.
- Wang Yang (Thai: เทศบาลตำบลวังยาง) consisting of subdistrict Wang Yang.
- Plai Na (Thai: เทศบาลตำบลปลายนา) consisting of subdistrict Plai Na.

There are four subdistrict administrative organizations (SAO) in the district:

- Si Prachan (Thai: องค์การบริหารส่วนตำบลศรีประจันต์) consisting of parts of subdistrict Si Prachan.
- Mot Daeng (Thai: องค์การบริหารส่วนตำบลมดแดง) consisting of subdistrict Mot Daeng.
- Bang Ngam (Thai: องค์การบริหารส่วนตำบลบางงาม) consisting of subdistrict Bang Ngam.
- Don Pru (Thai: องค์การบริหารส่วนตำบลดอนปรู) consisting of subdistrict Don Pru.
