= Don Chedi district =

Don Chedi ดอนเจดีย์
- District
- District location in Suphan Buri province
- Coordinates: 14°38′06″N 100°01′18″E
- Country: Thailand
- Province: Suphan Buri
- Seat: Don Chedi

Area
  - Total: 252.081 km^{2} (97.329 sq mi)

Population (2013)
  - Total: 453,839
  - Density: 179.8/km^{2} (466/sq mi)
- Time zone: UTC+7 (ICT)
- Postal code: 72170
- Geocode: 7206

Don Chedi (Thai: ดอนเจดีย์, pronounced [dɔ̄ːn t͡ɕēːdīː]) is a district (amphoe) of Suphan Buri province, Thailand.

== Geography ==
Neighboring districts are (from the north clockwise): Nong Ya Sai, Sam Chuk, Si Prachan, Mueang Suphan Buri and U Thong, and in Kanchanaburi province the district Lao Khwan.

== History ==
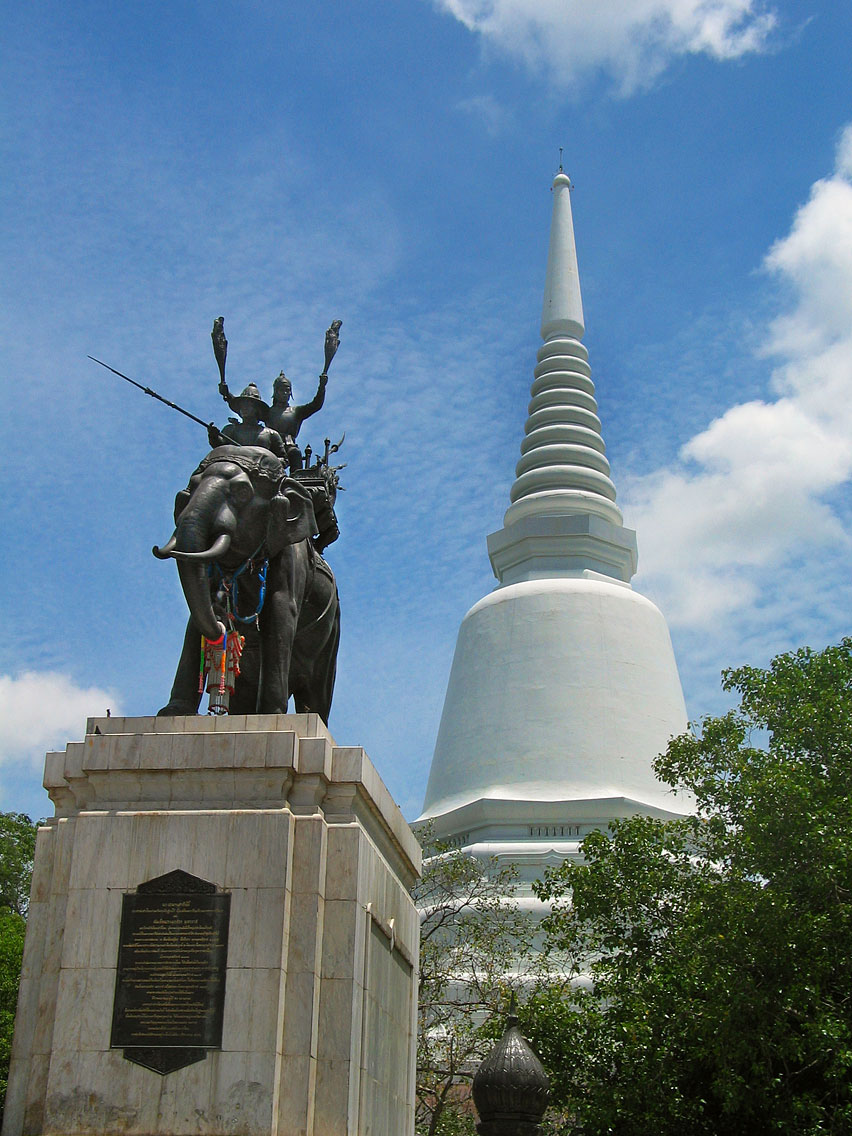
Don Chedi Monument

Prince Damrong Rajanubhab in 1913 discovered the remains of a large chedi within the district. He identified it as the one built by King Naresuan in 1593 after his victory against the Burmese. The chedi was reconstructed in 1952. In 1959 a statue of the king on his war elephant cast by Silpa Bhirasri was added.

However, more recent research casts doubt on this identification. Although one of the chronicles explicitly places the battle at Suphan Buri, the others do not give a clear location. The Dutch merchant Jeremias van Vliet, however, wrote in his Short History of the Kings of Siam in 1640 that the battle took place near Ayutthaya, which would make Chedi Phu Khao Thong the likely place of this battle.

The area of the district was originally part of Si Prachan district. It was established as a minor district (king amphoe) on 1 January 1962, consisting of the two tambons, Don Chedi and Nong Sarai. It was upgraded to a full district on 27 July 1965.

== Administration ==
=== Central administration ===
Don Chedi is divided into five subdistricts (tambons), which are further subdivided into 50 administrative villages (mubans).

No.	Name	Thai	Villages	Pop.
1.	Don Chedi	ดอนเจดีย์	9	14,634
2.	Nong Sarai	หนองสาหร่าย	10	7,724
3.	Rai Rot	ไร่รถ	10	7,398
4.	Sa Krachom	สระกระโจม	9	8,682
5.	Thale Bok	ทะเลบก	12	7,401

=== Local administration ===
There are two subdistrict municipalities (thesaban tambons) in the district:

- Don Chedi (Thai: เทศบาลตำบลดอนเจดีย์) consisting of parts of subdistrict Don Chedi.
- Sa Krachom (Thai: เทศบาลตำบลสระกระโจม) consisting of parts of subdistrict Sa Krachom.

There are five subdistrict administrative organizations (SAO) in the district:

- Don Chedi (Thai: องค์การบริหารส่วนตำบลดอนเจดีย์) consisting of parts of subdistrict Don Chedi.
- Nong Sarai (Thai: องค์การบริหารส่วนตำบลหนองสาหร่าย) consisting of subdistrict Nong Sarai.
- Rai Rot (Thai: องค์การบริหารส่วนตำบลไร่รถ) consisting of subdistrict Rai Rot.
- Sa Krachom (Thai: องค์การบริหารส่วนตำบลสระกระโจม) consisting of parts of subdistrict Sa Krachom.
- Thale Bok (Thai: องค์การบริหารส่วนตำบลทะเลบก) consisting of subdistrict Thale Bok.
