= Suphan Buri province =

Province of Thailand

Coordinates: 14°28′28″N 100°7′6″E

Suphan Buri สุพรรณบุรี
- Province
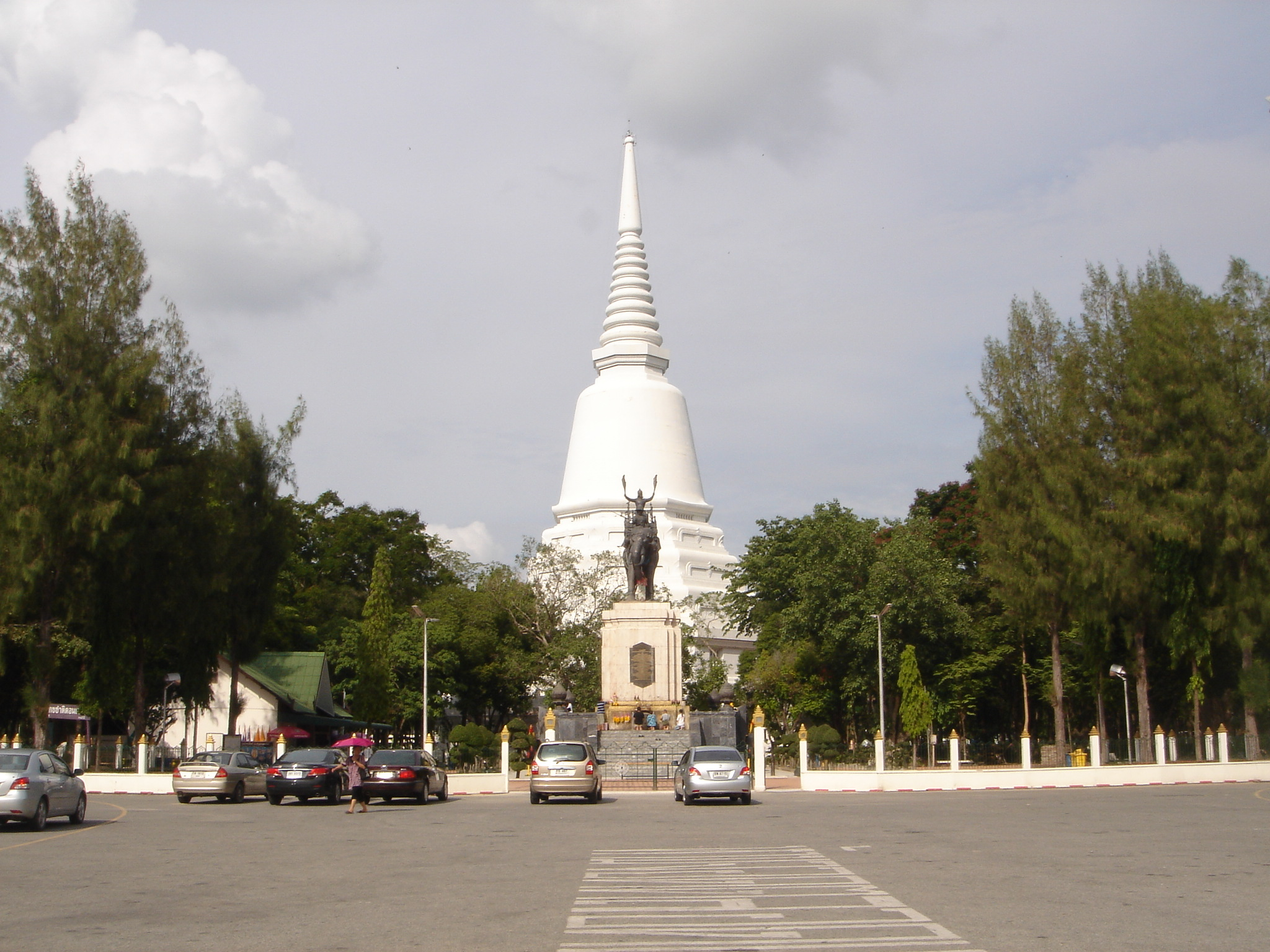
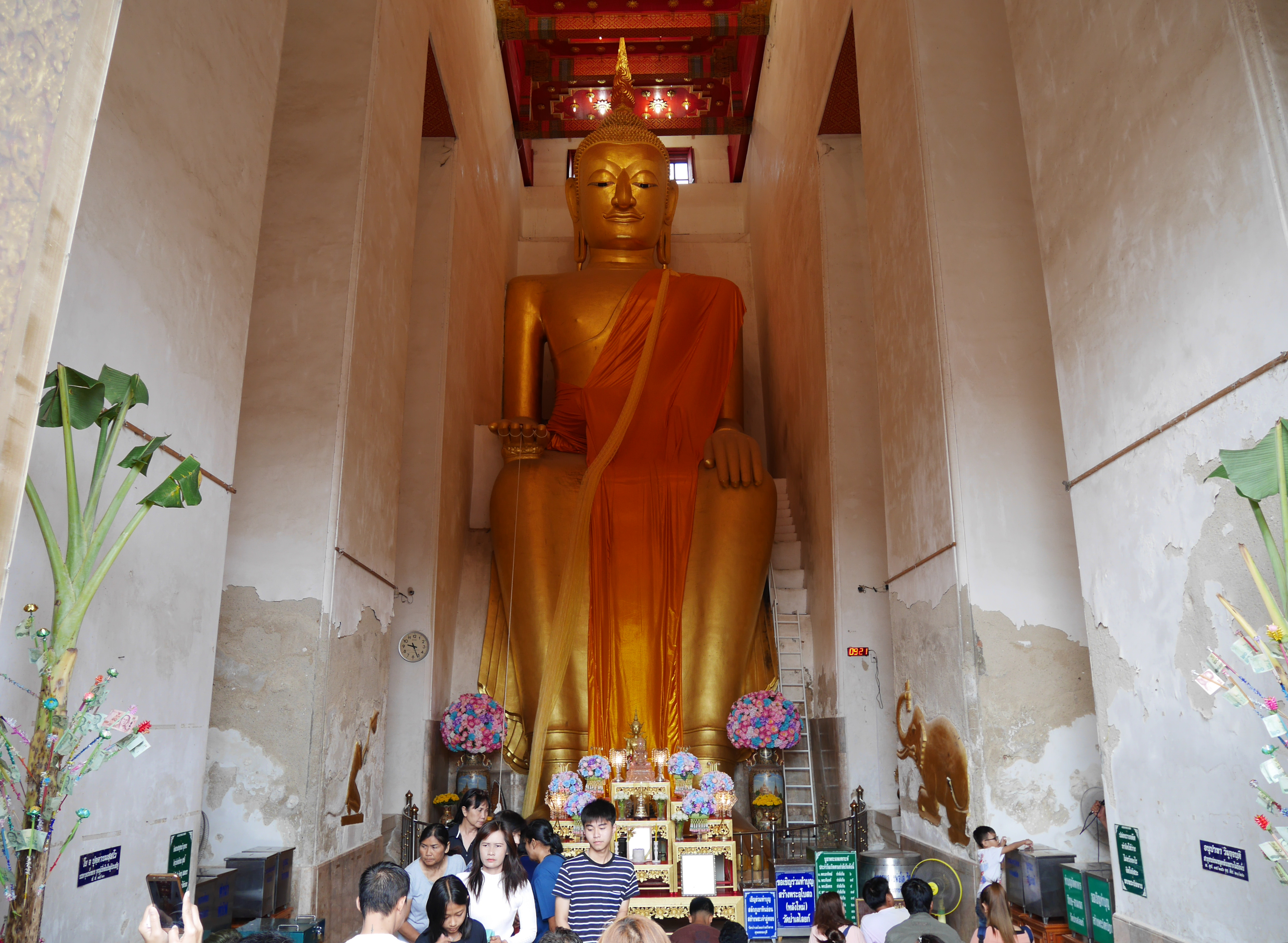
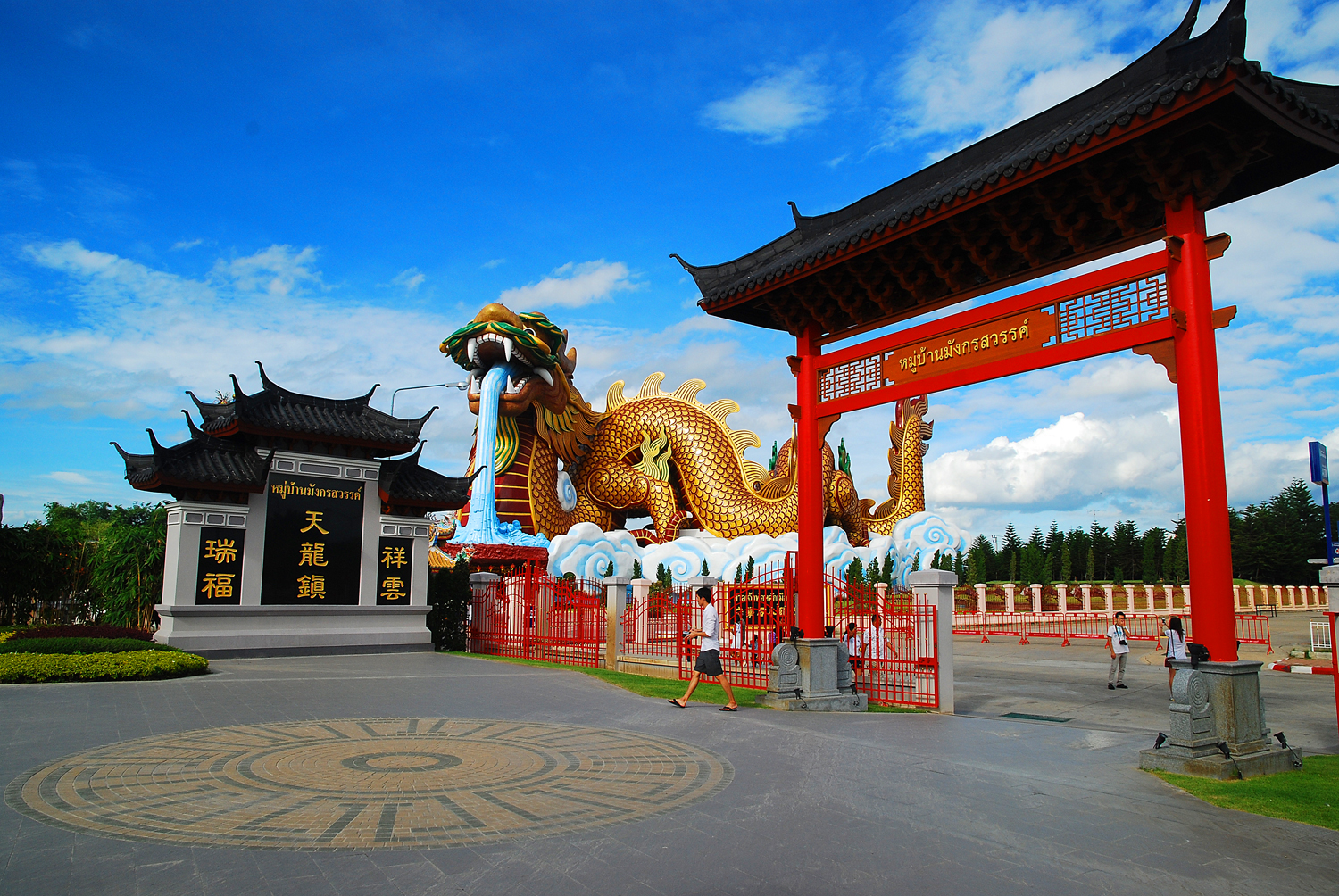
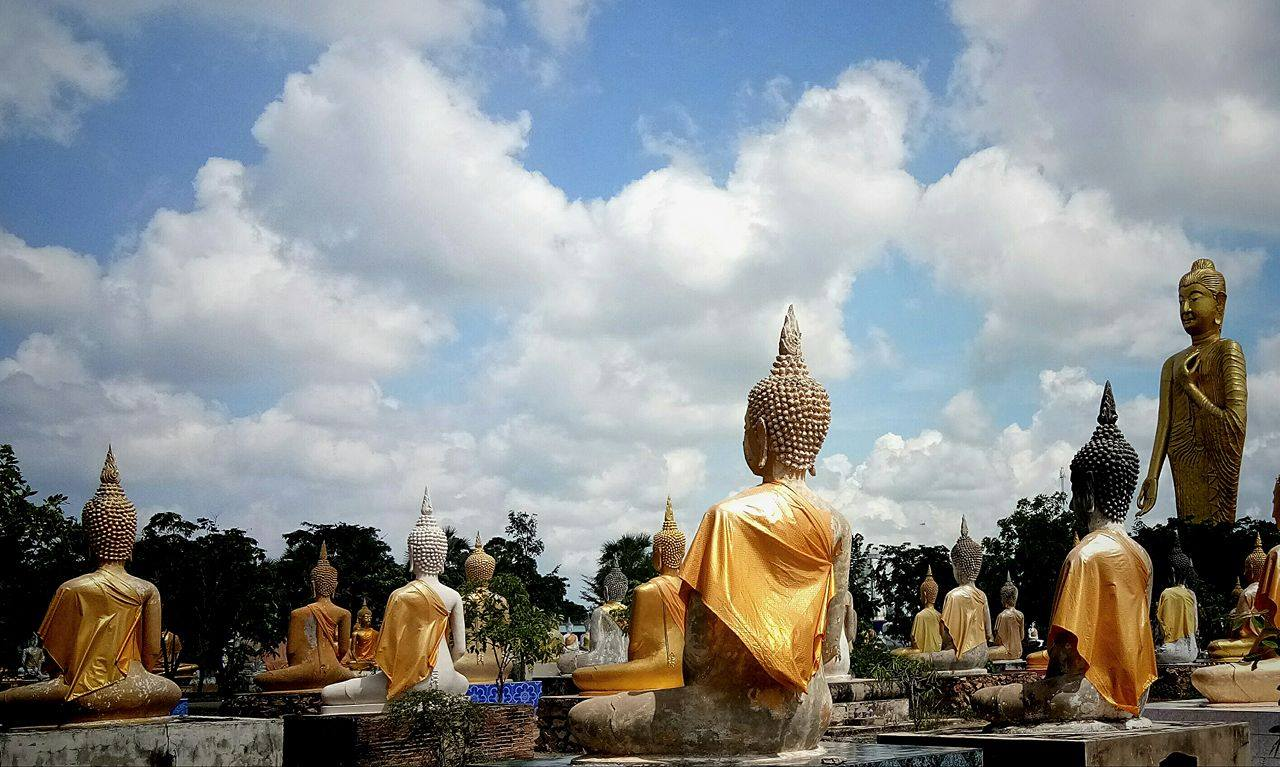
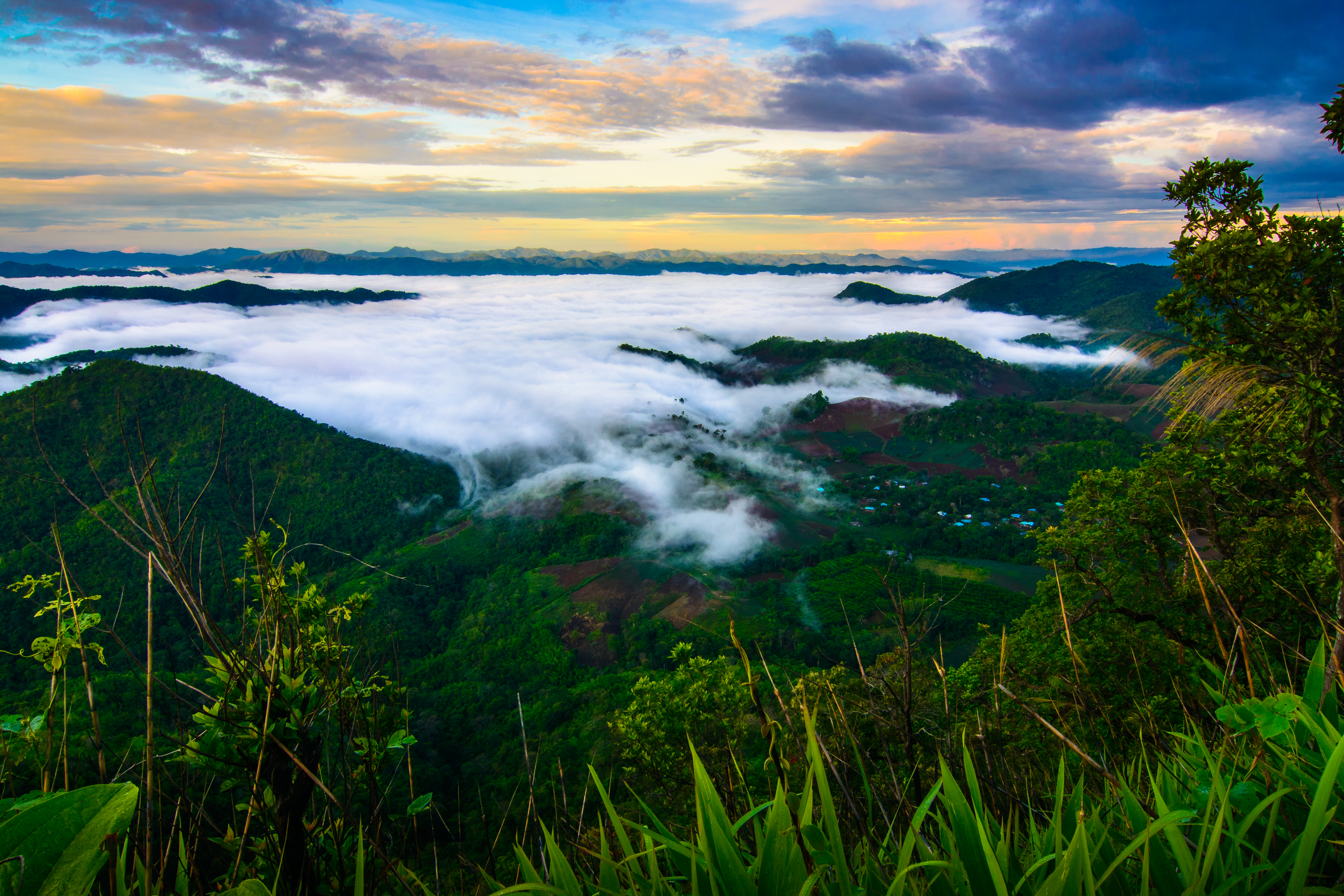
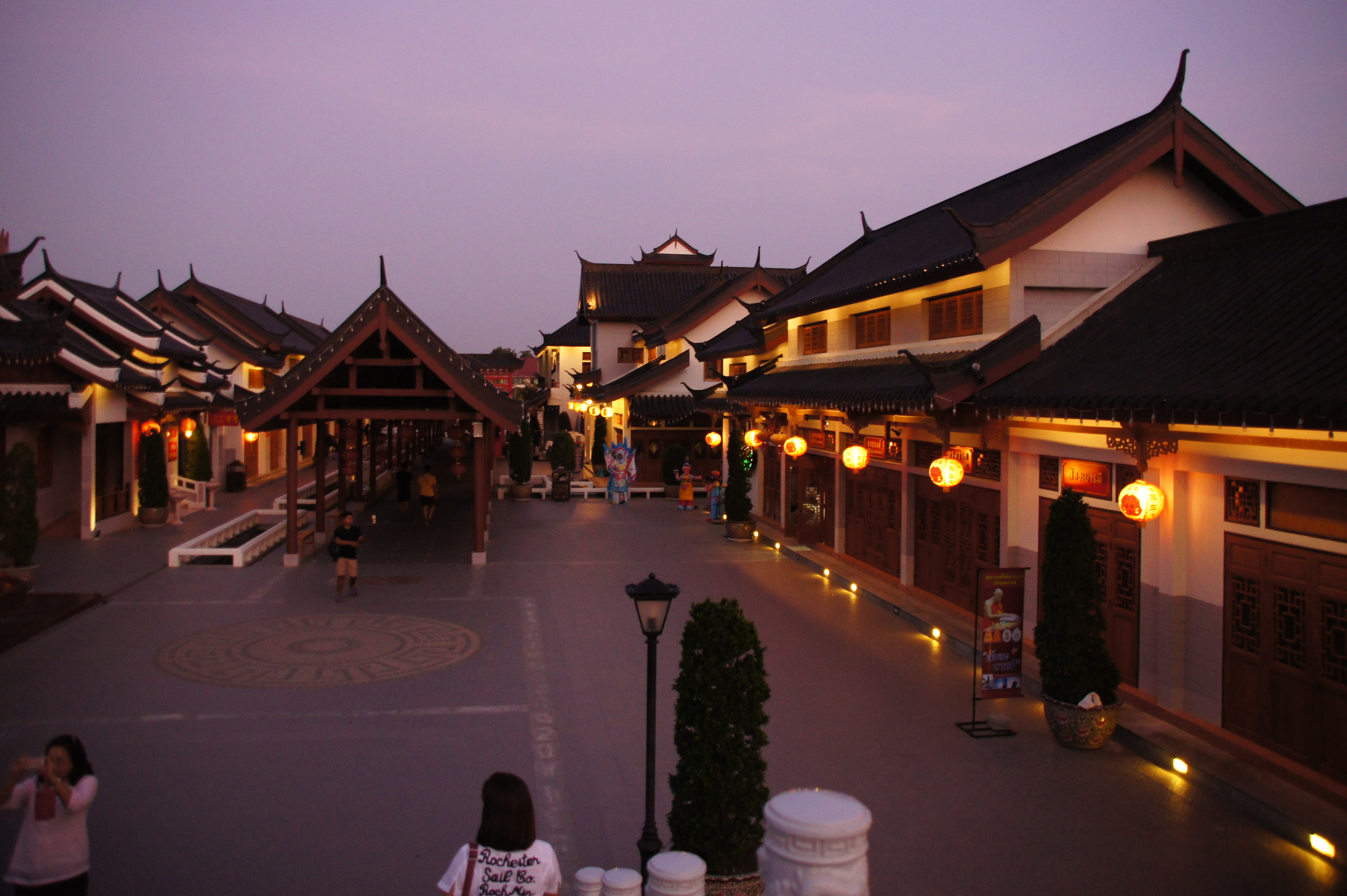
- (clockwise from top left) Don Chedi Memorial, Wat Pa Lelai Worawihan, Buddhist heaven and hell park at Wat Phai Rong Wua, Chinese village replica at the Dragon Descendants Museum, Phu Toei National Park, Giant Dragon Statue of Dragon Descendants Museum near the Suphan Buri Tutelary Shrine

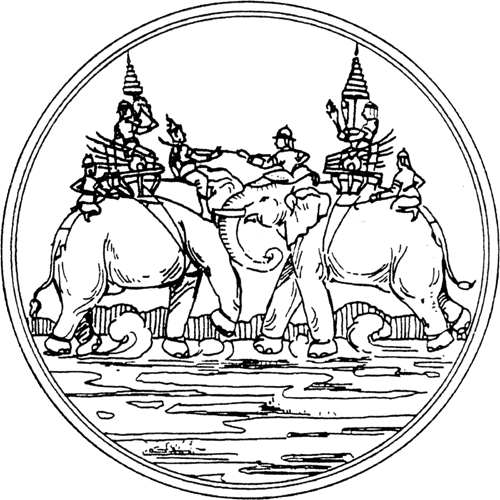
- Seal
- Nickname: Suphan
- Mottoes: สุพรรณบุรี เมืองยุทธหัตถี วรรณคดีขึ้นชื่อ เลื่องลือพระเครื่อง รุ่งเรืองเกษตรกรรม สูงล้ำประวัติศาสตร์ แหล่งปราชญ์ศิลปิน ภาษาถิ่นชวนฟัง ("Suphan Buri. City of the elephant battle. Famed literature. Renowned amulets. Prosperous agriculture. Amazing history. Home of scholars and artists. Listen to the local language.")
- Map of Thailand highlighting Suphan Buri province
- Country: Thailand
- Capital: Suphan Buri

Government
  - Governor: Piriya Chantadilok (since 2026)

Area
  - Total: 5,410 km^{2} (2,090 sq mi)
  - Rank: 41st

Population (2024)
  - Total: ▼822,211
  - Rank: 31st
  - Density: 152/km^{2} (390/sq mi)
  - Rank: 27th

Human Achievement Index
  - HAI (2022): 0.6599 "high" Ranked 12th

GDP
  - Total: baht 87 billion (US$3.0 billion) (2019)
- Time zone: UTC+7 (ICT)
- Postal code: 72xxx
- Calling code: 035
- ISO 3166 code: TH-72
- Website: www.suphanburi.go.th

Suphan Buri Provincial Administrative Organization องค์การบริหารส่วนจังหวัดสุพรรณบุรี
- Provincial Administrative Organization
- Interactive map of Suphan Buri Provincial Administrative Organization

Government
  - Type: Local administrative divisions
  - Body: Suphan Buri Provincial Administrative Organization
  - President: Udom Prongfa
- Website: suphan.go.th

Suphan Buri (Thai: สุพรรณบุรี, pronounced [sù.pʰān būrīː]) is a province (จังหวัด, changwat) in central Thailand, one of the country's 76 first-level administrative divisions. Its neighbours, clockwise from the north, are Uthai Thani, Chai Nat, Sing Buri, Ang Thong, Phra Nakhon Si Ayutthaya, Nakhon Pathom and Kanchanaburi. At the end of 2019 the province had a population of about 848,700, making up about 1.28 per cent of the national total. Its population is of mixed descent.

The name means 'city of gold'. Suphan Buri has been proposed as the site of the legendary Suvarnabhumi, but its first confirmed settlement dates from the Dvaravati period. Tang, Persian and Abbasid imports have been recovered at U Thong. The town was later a border town of Ayutthaya and the site of several battles with Burma; the elephant duel of 1592 is shown on the provincial seal. The province is Thailand's largest producer of water chestnuts.

== Toponymy ==
The word suphan originates from the Sanskrit word Suvarna (Devanagari: सुवर्ण), meaning 'gold', and the word buri from Sanskrit purī (Devanagari: पुरी), meaning 'town' or 'city'. Hence the name of the province literally means 'city of gold'.

== Geography ==
The terrain of the province is mostly low river plains, with small mountain ranges in the north and the west of the province. The southeastern part with the very low plain of the Tha Chin River or Suphan Buri River is paddy rice farming area. The province covers 3.3 million rai, or 5,358 km^{2} (2,069 sq mi). Forest covers 631 km^{2} (244 sq mi), 11.7 per cent of the province. Uthai Thani and Chai Nat lie to the north, Sing Buri, Ang Thong and Ayutthaya to the east, Nakhon Pathom to the south, and Kanchanaburi to the west. There is one national park, Phu Toei National Park, with an area of 317 km^{2} (122 sq mi), which, with eight other national parks, makes up region 3 (Ban Pong) of Thailand's protected areas.

== Climate ==
In summer the southeast monsoon from the South China Sea blows from February to mid-May, and the weather is hot and humid. In the rainy season the southwest monsoon from the Indian Ocean blows from May to mid-October, and the weather is humid and rainy. In winter the northeast monsoon blows from October to mid-February, and the weather is cold. The highest temperature is 39.3 °C (102.7 °F) in May and the lowest 15.7 °C (60.3 °F) in December.

== History ==
Historical affiliations

Dvaravati 6th–11th centuries
Kingdom of Suphanburi 913–1409
Kingdom of Ayutthaya 1409–1767
Kingdom of Thonburi 1767–1782
Kingdom of Siam 1782–1932
Kingdom of Thailand 1932–present

Suphan Buri has been proposed as the site of the legendary Suvarnabhumi, named in early Buddhist texts. Manop Nakkarnrian and his co-authors report that many scholars do not accept the identification of the lower central plain with the Suvarnabhumi of the mission sent by Ashoka, for want of clear archaeological evidence. Most of what has been recovered there shows only trade contact with India from the late Indian Iron Age, in the form of etched and plain agate and carnelian beads and high-tin bronze vessels.

The first confirmed settlement dates from the Dvaravati period, when the city was known as Mueang Thawarawadi Si Suphannaphumi ('the Dvaravati city of Suvarnabhumi'). Chalerm Kanchanakam estimated the town's foundation at about 877–883, calculating back from the Yonok Chronicle statement that its founder Phraya Phan came to rule Haripuñjaya in 913. Inscribed silver medallions reading śrī-dvāravatī-īśvara-puṇya have been recorded from this province and from Nakhon Pathom, Ratchaburi, Sing Buri, Lop Buri and Chai Nat. Most are chance finds of unknown provenance, many are in private collections, and forgeries have lately been noticed. The one group excavated under controlled conditions came from Khok Chang Din at U Thong in 1997. Suphan Buri is one of seven provinces that Eng Jin Ooi and Peter Skilling name as the main find-places of Dvāravatī wheels of the law, the others being Lopburi, Chai Nat, Nakhon Pathom, Ratchaburi, Phetchaburi and Nakhon Sawan.

The brick of the town has been examined in the laboratory. Sarunya Promkotra and colleagues sampled ancient brick collected in U Thong district, about 28 by 14 by 8 cm and tempered with rice chaff or rice husk ash. X-ray diffraction gave 91 per cent silica minerals, with a little hematite, which they read as sediment carried by a fast river and deposited near a tributary, delta or estuary. The bricks yielded in compression at 1.0–3.0 MPa, with an elastic modulus of 247–291 MPa, higher than brick they sampled at Mueang Fa Daet Song Yang in Kalasin. Both match experimental brick fired at 1,000–1,200 °C, a comparison they offer as general behaviour rather than as a strength for either town.

Imported goods of the eighth to tenth centuries are recorded at U Thong. Tang ceramic sherds and Persian Gulf turquoise-glazed ware are reported from the town, one sherd of the latter set into stucco ornament. Two Abbasid copper coins are also recorded. One bears a date equivalent to 767, in the caliphate of al-Mansur, though its provenance is not established. The other, of al-Mahdi, who reigned from 775 to 785, was excavated by the Fine Arts Department at monument 12 of Khok Chang Din.

Stucco and terracotta figures from the town have been identified as foreign merchants on their tall hats and boots. Beads from Noen Phlapphla in U Thong subdistrict include one of the lead composition treated as diagnostic of Chinese production. U Thong has also produced a gold-imitation glass bead of a type made at Siraf, at Berenike in Egypt and at Thung Tuek in Phang-nga. Striped beads from the town, which Chin Youdi called Roman in 1966, were held by Peter Francis to be products of the Middle East.

The Prasat Phra Khan inscription (จารึกปราสาทพระขรรค์), of the reign of the Angkorian king Jayavarman VII, names Suvarnapura. A survey by Phōngsi Wanasin and Thiwa Supcanya found the ancient settlements of the plain arranged in two rows above the 3.5-metre contour, the western running from Phetchaburi through Ratchaburi to Suphanburi. David K. Wyatt, who reports the survey, reads the rows as the fringes of a plain then largely under water rather than as a shoreline.

Wyatt also suggested Suphanburi, with Ratchaburi and Nakhon Chai Si, as one of three places in which the polity Chinese records call Chen Li Fu might be sought. His grounds are that its ruler held both a port and an inland capital, and that early Chinese navigators rarely called on the eastern coast of the Bay of Bangkok. Other scholars place it at Sankhaburi in Chai Nat province.

The town was later called U Thong and was once held to be the home of Prince U Thong, the founder of the Ayutthaya Kingdom. King Khun Luang Pha Ngua gave it its present name. As a border town it was the site of several battles with Burmese forces.

Sites of the 11th to 13th centuries are recorded across the province. At Ban Nong Chaeng in Don Chedi a dry-zone settlement has several square ponds and long earthen dykes built to catch runoff, laterite building bases with stucco, and metal-smelting debris including lead ingots. These were found with Northern and Southern Song ceramics, Northern Song coins and wares from the Buriram kilns. Noen Thang Phra, above Wat Lat Sing, is a square monument of about 50 by 50 m. Its stucco matches that of Ban Nong Chaeng, and that of Ban Don Krachon and Mueang Kosinarai beyond the province. Walailak Songsiri assigns it to Pala or Bagan influence reaching the area after the first half of the 12th century. Small bronze images of the same period, most often recovered buried in Chinese jars, run from the hills behind U Thong up the right bank of the Tha Wa as far as Don Chedi and Dan Chang.

The population is of mixed descent, chiefly Tai, Mon, Lao, Chinese and Khmer. Suphan Buri people speak a distinct Central Thai dialect, which is believed to be the form spoken during the Ayutthaya period.

== Economy ==
The province is Thailand's largest producer of water chestnuts (Thai: ลูกแห้ว, RTGS: luk haeo), grown mainly in the districts of Mueang Suphan Buri, Sam Chuk and Si Prachan. About half of the province's 3,000 rai of cultivated water chestnuts are found in Tambon Wang Yang of Si Prachan. The vegetable was registered as a geographical indication (GI) product of Suphan Buri in 2017. The Thai dessert thapthim krop (Thai: ทับทิมกรอบ), with water chestnuts as its main ingredient, was named one of the world's best 50 desserts in 2019 by CNN Travel.

== Symbols ==
The provincial seal shows the elephant battle between King Naresuan the Great and the crown prince of Burma in 1592, which took place in Suphan Buri.

The provincial tree is the ebony makleua (มะเกลือ, Diospyros mollis). The provincial flower is that of the silk cotton or buttercup tree, Cochlospermum religiosum. The provincial aquatic animal is the Boeseman croaker (Boesemania microlepis, ปลาม้า).

== Administrative divisions ==
Map of 10 districts

=== Provincial government ===
The province is divided into 10 districts (amphoes). The districts are further divided into 110 subdistricts (tambons) and 977 villages (mubans).

1. Mueang Suphan Buri
2. Doem Bang Nang Buat
3. Dan Chang
4. Bang Pla Ma
5. Si Prachan
6. Don Chedi
7. Song Phi Nong
8. Sam Chuk
9. U Thong
10. Nong Ya Sai

=== Local government ===
As of 26 November 2019 there are: one Suphan Buri Provincial Administration Organisation (ongkan borihan suan changwat) and 45 municipal (thesaban) areas in the province. Suphan Buri and Song Phi Nong have town (thesaban mueang) status. The other 43 are subdistrict municipalities (thesaban tambon). The non-municipal areas are administered by 81 Subdistrict Administrative Organisations - SAO (ongkan borihan suan tambon).

== Health ==
Suphan Buri's main hospital is Chao Phraya Yommarat Hospital, operated by the Ministry of Public Health.

== Transportation ==
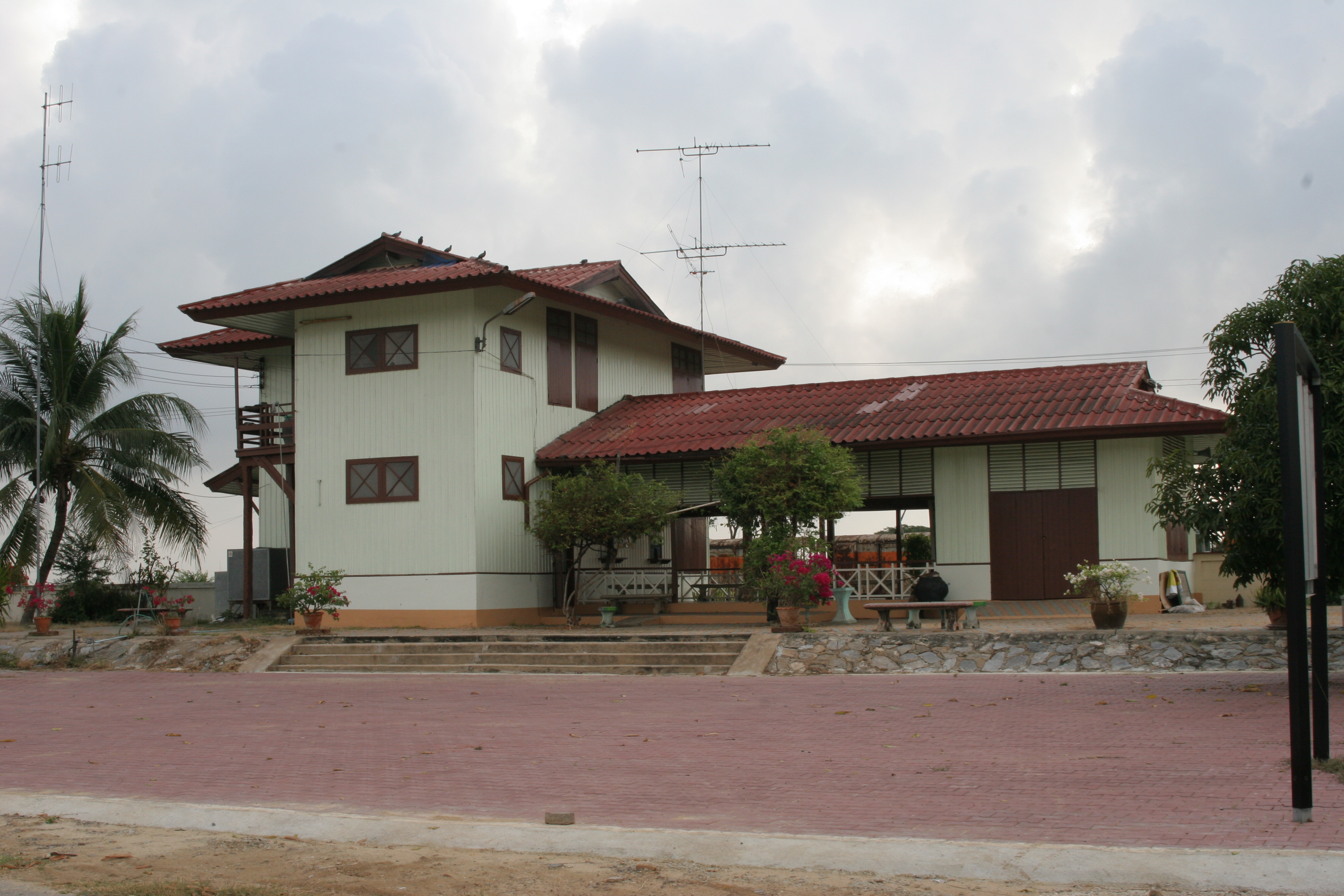
Suphan Buri Railway Station

=== Rail ===
Suphan Buri is at the end of a 157 kilometres (98 mi) branch line of the State Railway of Thailand's Southern Line, officially terminating at Suphan Buri railway station. The branch meets the main line at Nong Pladuk Junction near Ban Pong.

=== Roads ===
Route 340 passes through Suphan Buri, leading north to Chai Nat and south to Bang Bua Thong. Route 321 leads west and then south to Nakhon Pathom. Route 329 leads east to Bang Pahan. Route 3195 leads north-east to Ang Thong.

== Human achievement index 2022 ==
Health	Education	Employment	Income
27	45	17	16
Housing	Family	Transport	Participation
39	17	72	31
Province Suphan Buri, with an HAI 2022 value of 0.6599 is "high", occupies place 12 in the ranking.

Since 2003, United Nations Development Programme (UNDP) in Thailand has tracked progress on human development at sub-national level using the Human achievement index (HAI), a composite index covering all the eight key areas of human development. National Economic and Social Development Board (NESDB) has taken over this task since 2017.

Rank	Classification
1 - 13	"high"
14 - 29	"somewhat high"
30 - 45	"average"
46 - 61	"somewhat low"
62 - 77	"low"

Map with provinces and HAI 2022 rankings

== Notable people ==
- Khunluang Pha Ngua (1310–1388), the third king of Ayutthaya, founder of Suphannaphum dynasty
- Phetracha (1632–1703), the 28th king of Ayutthaya, founder of Ban Phlu Luang dynasty
- Suraphol Sombatcharoen (1930–1968), luk tung singer
- Banharn Silpa-archa (1932–2016), politician
- P. A. Payutto (born 1938), Buddhist monk
- Chumpol Silpa-archa (1940–2013), politician
- Waiphot Phetsuphan (1942–2022), luk tung singer
- Aswin Kwanmuang (born 1951), police, politician
- Yuenyong "Aed Carabao" Opakul, (born 1954), rock musician
- Pumpuang Duangjan (1961–1992), luk tung singer
- Artiwara "Toon Bodyslam" Kongmalai (born 1979), rock musician
