= Wan Yai district =

Wan Yai หว้านใหญ่
- District
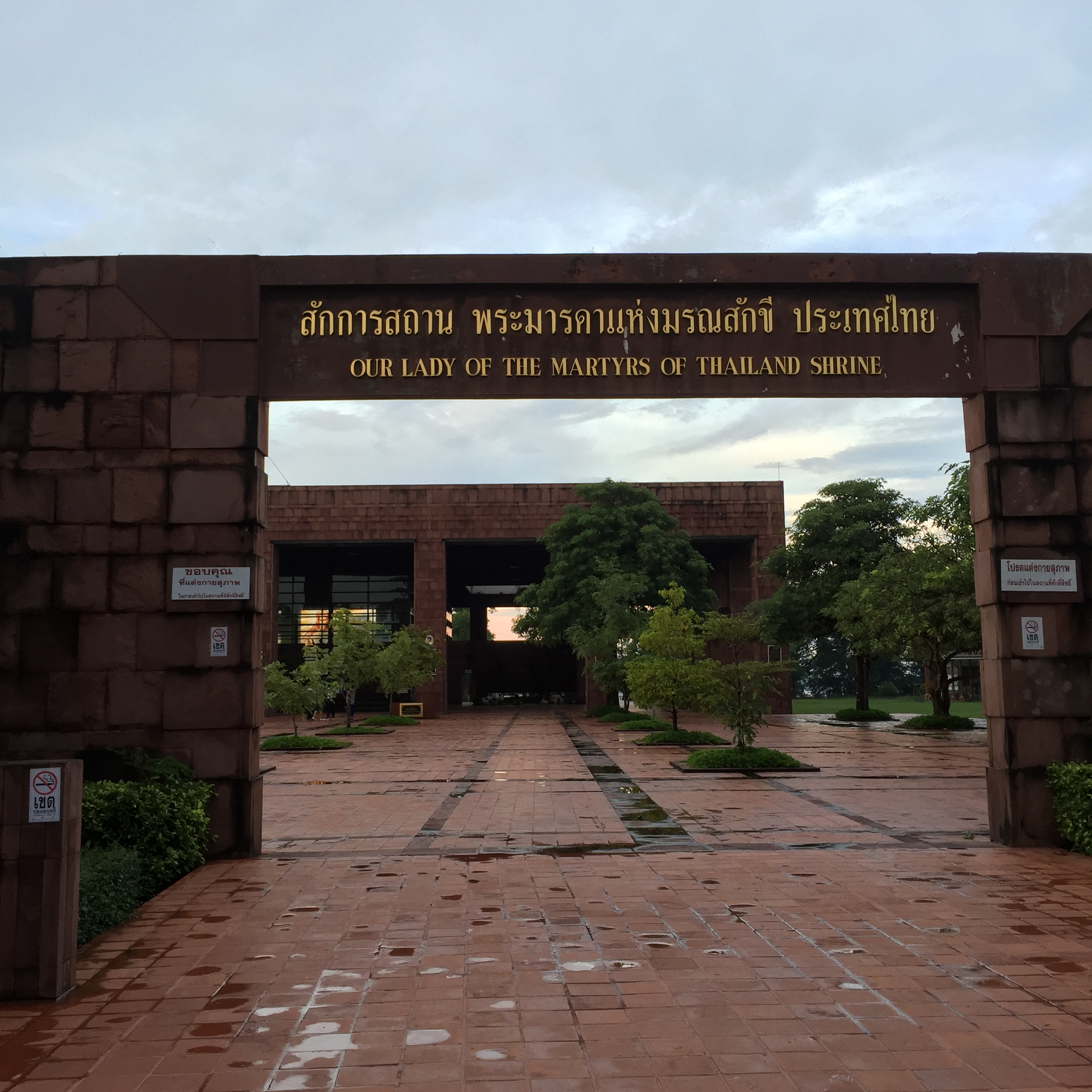
- Our Lady of the Martyrs of Thailand Shrine at Pong Kham

- District location in Mukdahan province
- Coordinates: 16°43′39″N 104°44′20″E
- Country: Thailand
- Province: Mukdahan
- Seat: Wan Yai

Area
  - Total: 84.48 km^{2} (32.62 sq mi)

Population (2005)
  - Total: 18,683
  - Density: 221.2/km^{2} (573/sq mi)
- Time zone: UTC+7 (ICT)
- Postal code: 49150
- Geocode: 4906

Wan Yai (Thai: หว้านใหญ่, pronounced [wâːn jàj]; Northeastern Thai: หว้านใหญ่, pronounced [wàːn ɲāj]) is a district (amphoe) of Mukdahan province, northeastern Thailand.

== Geography ==
Neighboring districts are (from the south clockwise): Mueang Mukdahan of Mukdahan Province and That Phanom of Nakhon Phanom province. To the east across the Mekong River is the Laotian province of Savannakhet.

The important water resource is the Mekong.

== History ==
The minor district (king amphoe) Wan Yai was created on 16 September 1977, when the tambon Wan Yai, Pong Kham, and Bang Sai Noi were split off from Mukdahan district. In 1982 it was one of six districts which formed the new province of Mukdahan. The minor district was upgraded to a full district on 9 May 1992.

== Administration ==
The district is divided into five sub-districts (tambon), which are further subdivided into 44 villages (muban). There are no municipal (thesaban) areas, and four tambon administrative organization (TAO).

No.	Name	Thai name	Villages	Pop.
1.	Wan Yai	หว้านใหญ่	11	4,739
2.	Pong Kham	ป่งขาม	11	5,337
3.	Bang Sai Noi	บางทรายน้อย	11	4,715
4.	Chanot	ชะโนด	5	2,444
5.	Dong Mu	ดงหมู	6	1,448
