= Mukdahan Buddhist procession crash =

2026 truck crash

Details
- Date: 2 July 2026
- Location: Mukdahan province
- Country: Thailand

Statistics
- Vehicles: 1
- Crew: 1
- Pedestrians: 39
- Deaths: 10
- Injured: 10

On 2 July 2026, an 11-year-old boy crashed his parents' pickup truck into a procession in Mukdahan province. Ten Buddhist monks were killed and 10 were injured.

== Incident ==
A group of 34 Buddhist monks and five lay followers were undertaking a pilgrimage to a temple in Ubon Ratchathani when an 11-year-old autistic boy drove his parent's pickup truck and crashed into the procession, five monks were killed at the scene and five died later in hospital. Two remain in critical condition and more are being treated for lighter injuries.

== Aftermath ==
Following the crash, the boy was taken into the care of the Ministry of Social Development and Human Security.

As he was under the age of 12, he could not be punished under Thailand's Criminal Code.

== Reactions ==
Worayan Bunnarat, provincial governor of Mukdahan, said that the case should serve as a warning about road safety in Thailand. The Bangkok Post wrote that the accident "highlights critical questions about child protection, parental responsibility and road safety."
