= Monsit Khamsoi =

Thai luk thung singer

- มนต์สิทธิ์ คำสร้อย
- Born: Boontheng Kaewseenuan (Thai: บุญเถิง แก้วศรีนวล); 30 April 1964 (age 62); Nakhon Phanom Province (now Mukdahan Province), Thailand
- Occupation: Singer
- Musical career
- Genres: Luk thung
- Years active: 1995–present
- Label: Sure Entertainment

Monsit Khamsoi (born 30 April 1964, Thai: มนต์สิทธิ์ คำสร้อย) is a Thai singer.

== Early life ==
His birth name is Boontheng Kaewseenuan. He was born in Mukdahan District, Nakhon Phanom Province (current Nikhom Kham Soi District, Mukdahan Province). He is the son of Noola-Yun Kaewseenuan. Since his family was poor, he completed Primary 4, and then went to work in Bangkok.

== Career ==
He met DJ Monrak Klinbupha, who took him to many labels, but this did not happen. In 1995, he worked as a singer of Sure Entertainment and recorded his first studio album Khai Kwai Chuai Mae, and in 1996, his second album Sang Nang, which was successful. Songs from this album were covered by entertainers such as Jod Mai Phid Song.

In 2013 he came out as gay.

== Discography ==
- 1995 – "Khai Kwai Chuai Mae" (ขายควายช่วยแม่)
- 1996 – "Sang Nang" (สั่งนาง)
- 1997 – "Kid Tueng Jang Loey" (คิดถึงจังเลย)
- 1998 – "Ko Sam Phi" (โกสัมพี)
- 1999 – "Kam Lang Jai" (กำลังใจ)
- 2001 – "Dok Mai Hai Khoon" (ดอกไม้ให้คุณ)
- 2002 – "Pha Poo Tieang" (ผ้าปูเตียง)
- 2007 – "Rong Siea Hai Phoe" (ร้องเสียให้พอ)
