= Mukdahan province =

Coordinates: 16.54°N 104.72°E

Mukdahan มุกดาหาร
- Province
- Mukdahan province จังหวัดมุกดาหาร
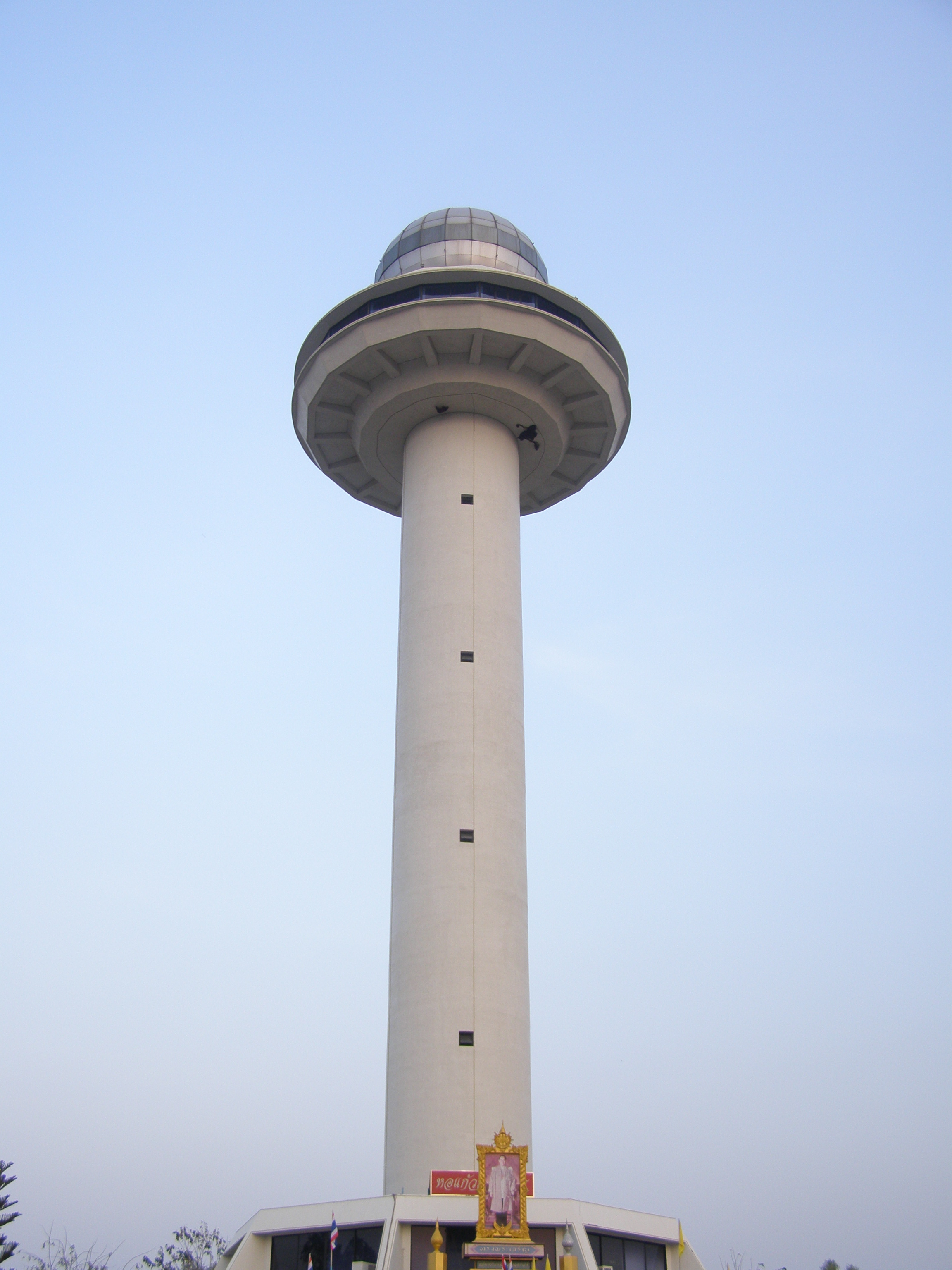
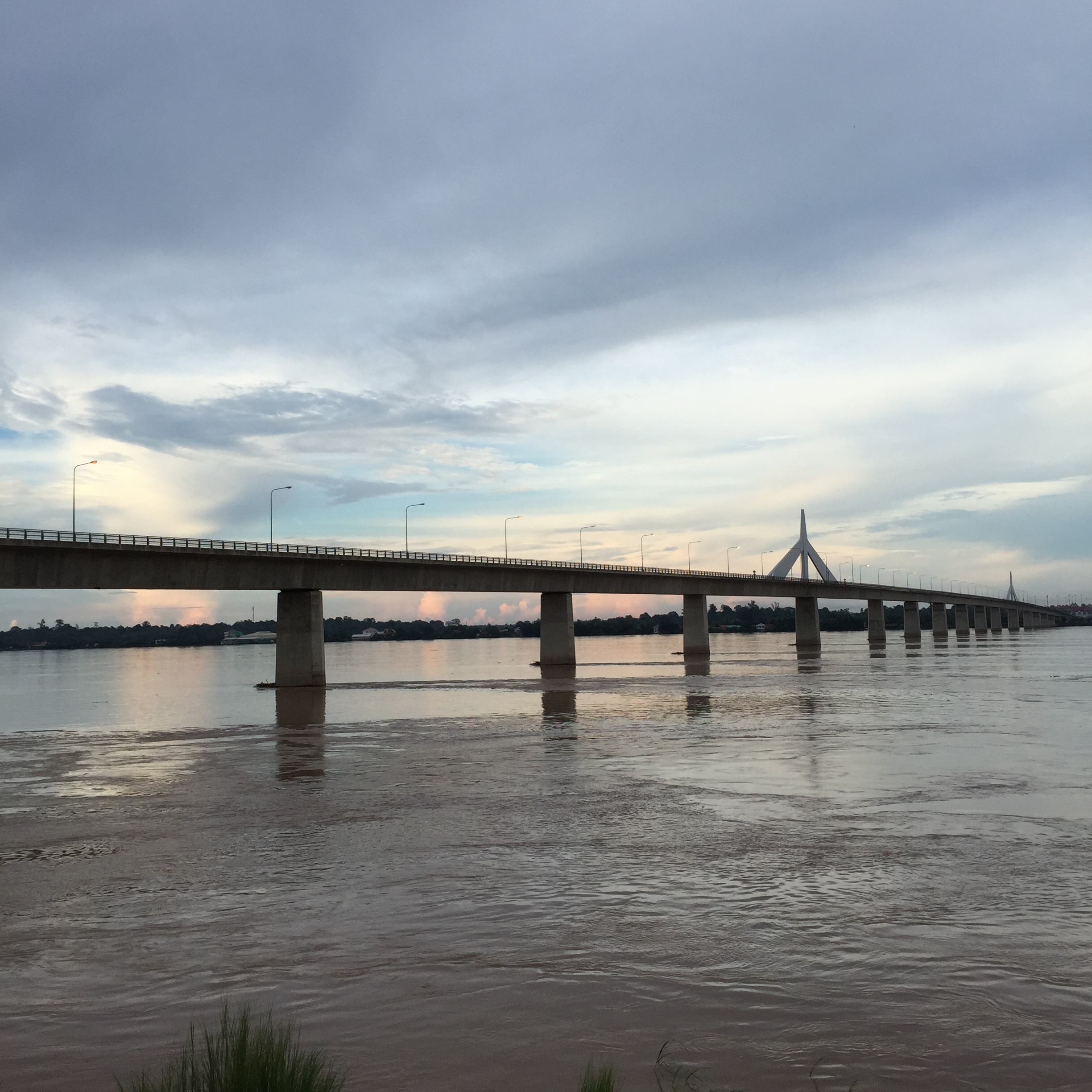
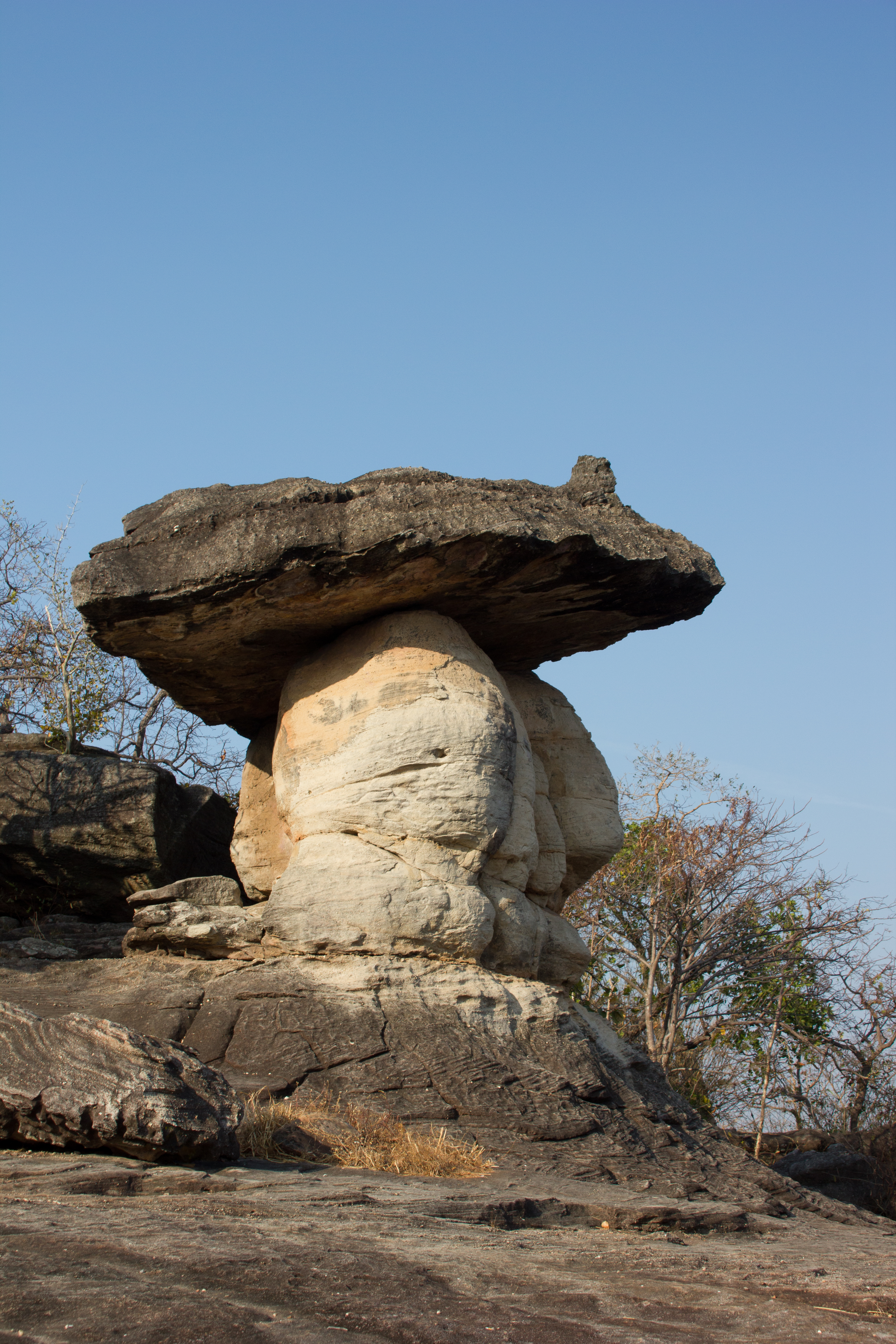
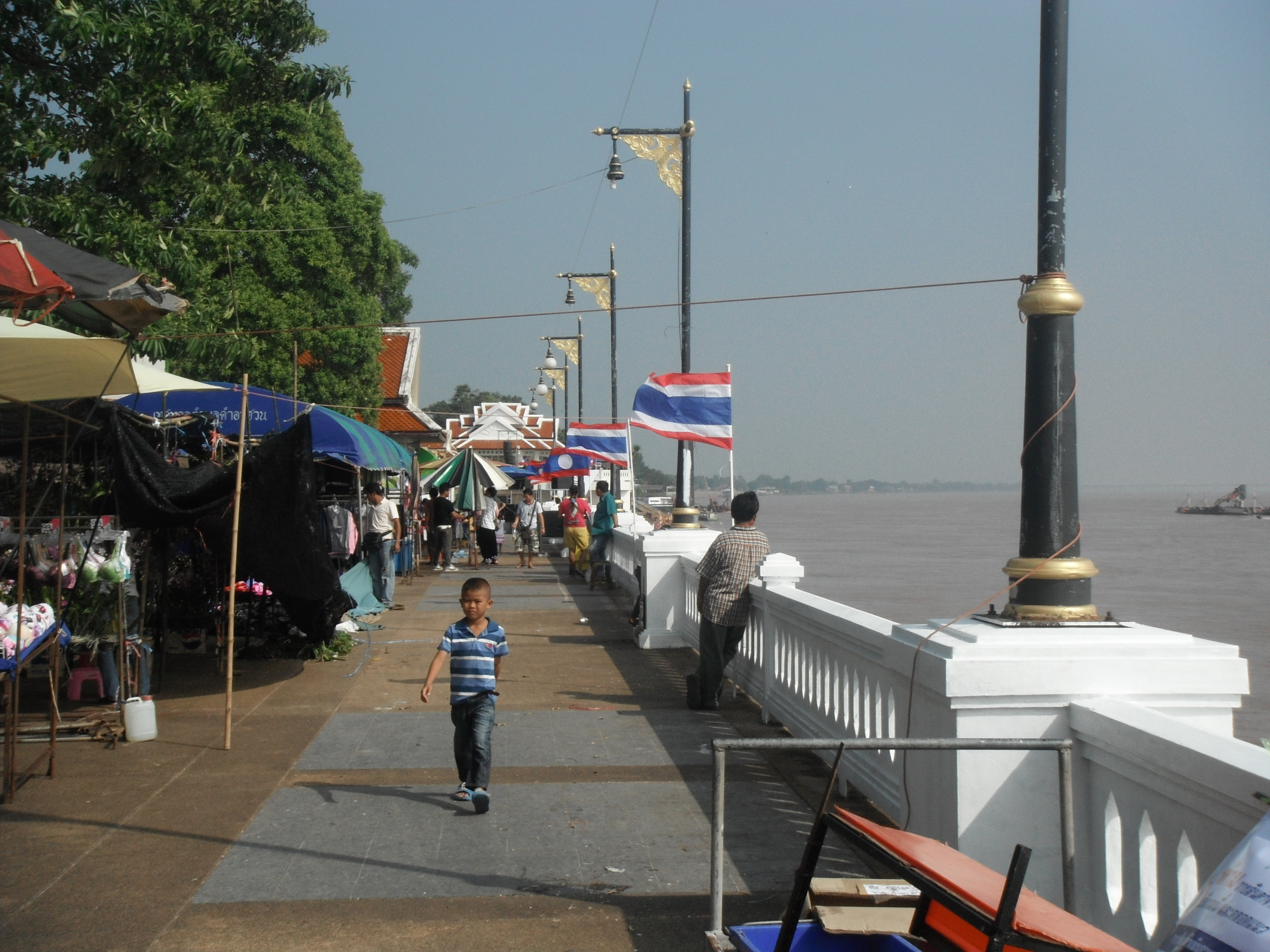
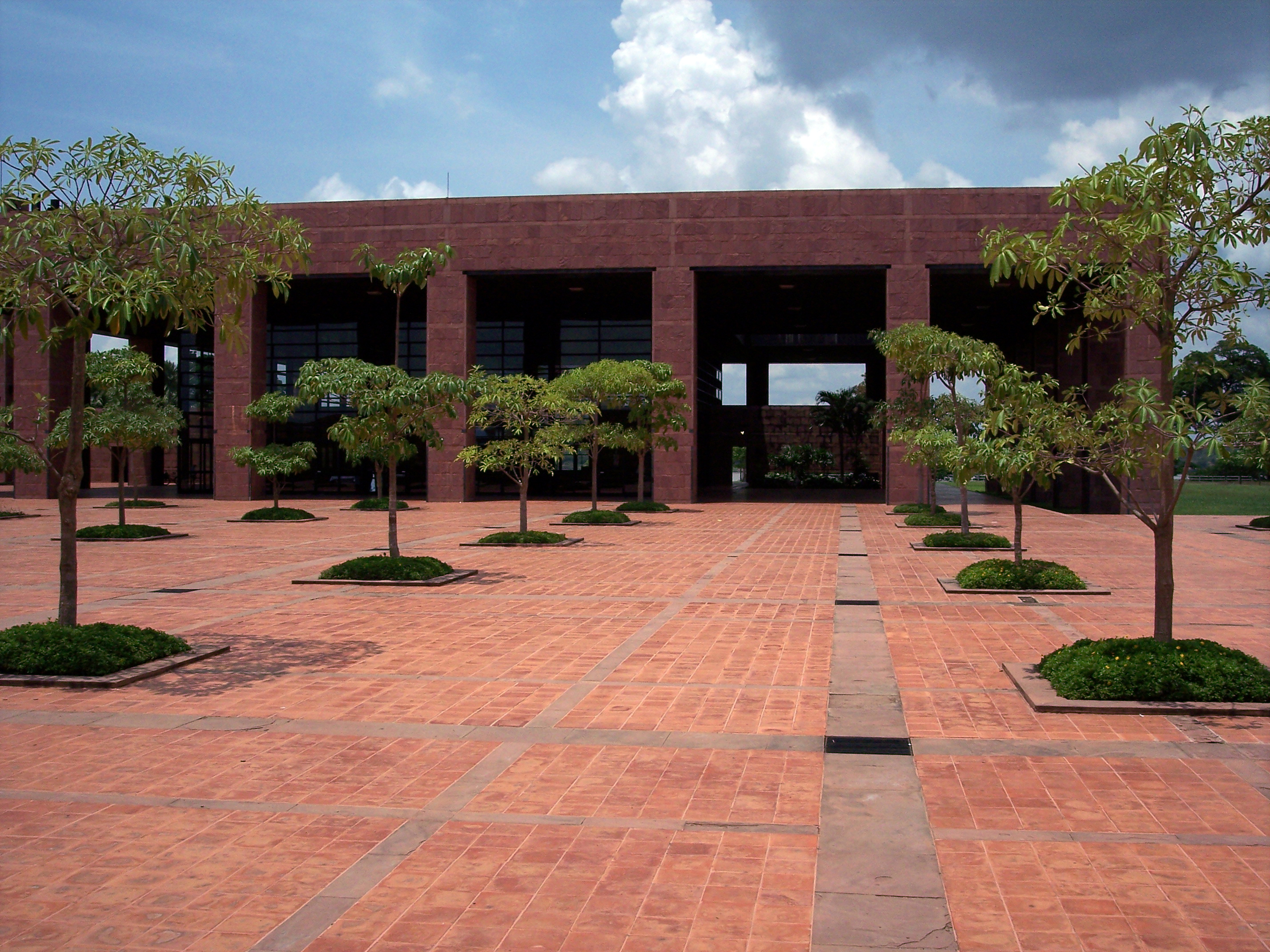
- Ho Kaeo Mukdahan Tower Riverside viewpoint along the Mekong River Second Thai–Lao Friendship Bridge Phu Pha Thoep National Park Indochina Market Shrine of the Mother of the Martyrs

- Flag Seal
- Nickname(s): Muk, Mueang Bang Muk, Mukdahan Buri Sri Sattatalanakhon
- Motto(s): หอแก้วสูงเสียดฟ้า ภูผาเทิบแก่งกะเบา แปดเผ่าชนพื้นเมือง ลือเลื่องมะขามหวาน กลองโบราณล้ำเลิศ ถิ่นกำเนิดลำผญา ตระการตาชายโขง เชื่อมโยงอินโดจีน ("Towering Ho Kaeo tower. Phu Pha Thoep and Kaeng Kabao. Eight local tribes. Famed sweet tamarinds. Amazing ancient drums. Home of the Lamphaya teachings. Spectacular Mekong riverfront. Connecting Indochina.")
- Map of Thailand highlighting Mukdahan province
- Country: Thailand
- Region: Northeastern Thailand
- Capital: Mukdahan

Government
  - Type: Province and Provincial Administrative Organization
  - Body: Mukdahan Province and Mukdahan Provincial Administrative Organization
  - Governor: Worayan Bunnarat
  - PAO Chief Executive: Weeraphong Thongpha

Area
  - Total: 4,339.830 km^{2} (1,675.618 sq mi)
  - Rank: 51st

Population (2024)
  - Total: ▲350,510
  - Rank: 65th
  - Density: 81.01/km^{2} (209.8/sq mi)
  - Rank: 60th

Human Achievement Index
  - HAI (2022): 0.6276 "somewhat low" Ranked 59th

GDP
  - Total: baht 31.2 billion (US$0.9 billion) (2023)
- Time zone: UTC+7 (ICT)
- Postal code: 49xxx
- Calling code: 042
- ISO 3166 code: TH-49
- Website: mukdahan.go.th

Mukdahan (Thai: มุกดาหาร [múk̚dāːhǎːn]; Isan: มุกดาหาร [mùk̚dàːhǎːn]) is a border province located in the upper northeastern region of Thailand. Its topography lies within the Sakon Nakhon basin, with the Mekong River serving as a natural boundary separating Mukdahan province from Savannakhet province, Laos. The provincial administrative center is approximately 652 kilometers from Bangkok and about 108 kilometers from Nakhon Phanom province. Mukdahan is part of the Upper Northeastern Region 2 provincial cluster, also known as the "SNUK" group (comprising Sakon Nakhon, Nakhon Phanom, and Mukdahan).

Mukdahan is an ancient city with a long history dating back to the pre-settlement period. Archaeological evidence indicates that this area was once the site of prehistoric communities dating back approximately 3,000–5,000 years. The province's historical narrative begins with the establishment of Mueang Mukdahan in 1770 during the Thonburi Kingdom, founded by Prince Kinnari Chanthakinnaree. After 137 years as a first-class city, it was administratively reformed and consolidated into a district of Mueang Nakhon Phanom and subsequently became part of Nakhon Phanom province. It remained a district for 75 years before being elevated and separated from Nakhon Phanom province on September 27, 1982. It is the 73rd province of Thailand (counting Bangkok) or the 72nd (counting only provincial administrative divisions).

In terms of geopolitics and economy, Mukdahan province occupies a strategically important position and is known as the "Gateway to Indochina." It serves as a center for border trade and logistics along the East–West Economic Corridor (EWEC) and is designated as a Special Economic Zone (SEZ). The Second Thai–Lao Friendship Bridge is the main transportation link connecting to Vietnam and southern China. In terms of demography and society, Mukdahan is a multicultural society comprising eight indigenous ethnic groups, integrated with Thai people of Vietnamese descent and Thai people of Chinese descent. The province also features natural attractions and important religious sites such as Phu Pha Thoep National Park, Ho Kaeo Mukdahan Tower, and Wat Phra Phutthabat Phu Manrom.

== Etymology ==
Mukdahan province was originally Mueang Mukdahan, which has been known by various names throughout history, including Mueang Mukdahan Buri Si Mutikkanakhon, Mukdahan Buri Si Sattatalanakhon, Mukdahan Buri, and Mueang Bang Muk. According to the Royal Institute Dictionary 2011, the word Mukdahan has Sanskrit and Pali origins, conveying meaning of value and beauty, with two interpretations:

1. Meaning "pearl": In linguistics, "Mukdahan" derives from the Sanskrit word muktā or the Pali word muttā, meaning "pearl." When compounded as muktāhāra or muttāhāra, it means "pearl necklace," a valuable ornament.
2. Meaning "gemstone": In the context of the Navaratna (the nine auspicious gemstones), Mukdahan refers to "a gemstone with a pale misty color" (milky white resembling moonlight), considered a rare and auspicious precious stone.

The origins of the province's name are based on several legends and hypotheses:

- Mukdahan, Mukdahan Buri, and Bang Muk (or Bang Mukdahan): These names originate from the legend of the city's founding. It is said that while building the settlement, residents witnessed a brilliant, radiant gemstone emerging from seven sugar palm trees on the Mekong riverbank at dusk, floating along the river and returning to the trees at dawn, almost every night. Combined with the discovery of pearls in clams in the Mekong, Chao Chanthakinnaree named this miraculous gem "Kaew Mukdahan" (one of the nine gems in the Navaratna legend). Since it was found near Huai Bang Muk ("Bang" meaning stream), he named the new city Mueang Mukdahan (meaning "pearl gem")—the origin of the names Bang Muk and Bang Mukdahan.
- Mueang Mukdahan Buri Si Mutikkanakhon: This extended name was used in later periods, with "Buri" meaning city, combined with "Si Mutikkanakhon" derived from "Mukda" or "Muktika" (pearl gem), symbolizing the prosperity and prestige of the city of pearls.
- Mukdahan Buri Si Sattatalanakhon: Meaning "City of the Mukdahan Gem and Seven Sugar Palms," this name relates to the legend above, with "Sattatalan" referring to the seven distinctive sugar palm trees that characterized the original landscape.
- According to Prince Damrong Rajanubhab's inspection records: Prince Damrong recorded that the front of Mukdahan had a sandy beach where locals believed precious gems were hidden in the sand, hence naming the city "Mukdahan" after the magical gems in the sand.
- From moonstone or Chandrakanta: It is hypothesized that in the past, this area had abundant moonstone deposits, supported by historical evidence.

== History ==
=== Prehistoric period ===
==== Paleozoic and Mesozoic eras ====
The Mukdahan area is a significant site for discovering fossils from the Paleozoic and Mesozoic eras, including Mukdahannodus trisivakulii, an ancient shark fossil, and other fossils from various sites, demonstrating the richness of ancient ecosystems spanning from the Paleozoic to the Mesozoic eras.

==== Early society (3,000–2,000 years ago) ====
Human settlement and social development in the Mukdahan area date back to the late prehistoric period, approximately 3,000–2,000 years ago. Early inhabitants lived in primitive tribal societies. Important archaeological evidence includes cave paintings in various caves such as Tham Pha Mueang Daeng on Phu Ang Bok, featuring red paintings of humans, hands, weapons, and geometric symbols; Tham Tin Daeng, with paintings of humans, animals, and red footprints—the first site in Thailand to feature such prints; and Tham Pha Taem at Phu Wat, Don Tan District, with numerous handprints and symbols from rituals seeking abundance.

Additionally, ancient settlements and burial sites have been discovered at the Nai Kong Khun archaeological site along the Mekong River in Don Tan District, yielding stone tools, flakes, and polished stones. Two Dong Son bronze drums have also been found in Mukdahan, with the site believed to be a production and export center for bronze drums in ancient times, as it is the first site in Southeast Asia where bronze drum molds were discovered at the Non Nong Ho archaeological site. Particularly, the drum found in Don Tan District is the largest bronze drum in Thailand, dated by archaeologists to around the 7th–8th Buddhist century. The original population consisted of indigenous highland peoples (Kha tribes) and later Tai-Lao or lowland Lao groups who migrated into the plains.

=== Historical period ===
==== Kingdom of Sri Kotrabun (Funan) ====
During the 5th–12th Buddhist centuries, the Mekong floodplain area fell under the influence of the Kingdom of Kotrabun (Funan). This area adopted Dvaravati culture and Mahayana Buddhist beliefs, as evidenced by the discovery of numerous large laterite stone sema markers at Hat Woen Chai Monastery in Don Tan District, dated to approximately the 12th–13th Buddhist centuries.

==== Chenla Kingdom ====
As the Kotrabun Kingdom declined, the Chenla Kingdom extended its influence over the area during the 15th–18th Buddhist centuries. The Mukdahan area, contiguous with Ubon Ratchathani province, was a border community that was part of the Chenla state, whose population belonged to the Mon-Khmer ethnic group.

==== Khmer Empire ====
The Khmer Empire later extended its influence extensively throughout the Isan region during the 15th–18th Buddhist centuries. Although no Khmer-style religious structures have been found in Mukdahan, numerous ear-handled urns containing human bones have been discovered buried underground in almost every district. Archaeologists identify these artifacts as Lopburi (Khmer) style art, often covered with glazed bowls.

=== Mueang Mukdahan period (Thonburi–pre-administrative reform) ===
==== Settlement and establishment of Mueang Mukdahan ====
The Mukdahan area had been under the influence of the Lan Xang Kingdom during the 19th–22nd Buddhist centuries. In 1767, Chao Chanthakinnaree led his people from Luang Phonsim on the left bank of the Mekong River to settle on the right bank at the mouth of Huai Bang Muk, following a hunter's report of an abandoned city and temple. Recognizing the strategic suitability of the location, he began building the city in 1767 and officially established it in 1770.

During the reign of King Taksin the Great of the Thonburi Kingdom, the king extended his territory and authority to Mukdahan. In 1778, King Taksin appointed Chao Chanthakinnaree as the first ruler of Mukdahan, bestowing the title "Phraya Chanthasrisurach Uparaja Manthaturaj." Mukdahan thus became a city within the territory of Thonburi from that time onward.

==== Pre-administrative reform period ====
Entering the Rattanakosin Kingdom period, Mueang Mukdahan held the status of a tributary city of Siam (known by various names: Mueang Mukdahan Buri Si Mutikkanakhon, Mukdahan Buri Si Sattatalanakhon, Mukdahan Buri, or Mueang Bang Muk). Following the administrative reform introducing the Monthon (thesaphiban) system in 1894, Mueang Mukdahan was transferred to the administration of Monthon Udon.

==== Social, economic, and geographic conditions from Prince Damrong's inspection records (1906) ====
In January 1906, Prince Damrong Rajanubhab, Minister of Interior, conducted an inspection tour of Monthon Udon and Monthon Ubon. On the morning of January 20, 1906, he traveled by royal barge along the Mekong, greeting residents at Ban Bang Sai Noi and observing the scenery of Savannakhet on the French-controlled left bank. At 10:00 AM, he arrived at Mueang Mukdahan, where he was ceremoniously welcomed by the city administration led by Phraya Sasiwong Prawat (Mek Chanthasakha), the city governor. Monks were invited to chant auspicious verses at the city's waterfront pier. He then proceeded to his lodging, a plastered wattle-and-daub building prepared by Phra Anuchat Wutthathikhun (Pae Na Nongkhai). In the afternoon, he participated in the Bai Sri Su Khwan ceremony to express loyalty and visited important religious sites including Wat Si Mongkol Tai, Wat Klang (Wat Yot Kaeo Siwichai), and Wat Si Bunrueang, as well as observing the villagers' way of life.

Prince Damrong's memoirs, "Travels in Various Places, Part 4," clearly depict the social, economic, and geographic conditions of Mueang Mukdahan during the late thesaphiban period. He recorded the origin of the city's name, noting that the front of the city had large sand and gravel beaches where locals believed precious gems were hidden. The city plan featured wide, clean streets, although the houses appeared weathered. Economically, Mukdahan served as a center for collecting local products such as animal hides, horns, and herbs, transported by ox-carts through the forest for trade in Nakhon Ratchasima (Khorat), returning with consumer goods like silk, brassware, and petroleum. He also noted differences in border trade: the French government monopolized tobacco and matches, strictly taxing goods from the Thai side to subsidize their operations. Although petroleum was cheaper on the Savannakhet side, Mukdahan residents preferred goods from Khorat due to better quality, and most people were not yet accustomed to using petroleum.

Regarding geography and transportation, he recorded the vastness and natural obstacles of the Mekong River, which differed from his initial expectations that it would resemble the Chao Phraya River. The river was turbid and flowed fiercely year-round, full of dangers from rocks, shifting sandbars, dangerous animals (crocodiles and mythical "pla mueak" according to local beliefs), and numerous large rapids, particularly "Kaeng Khab Phuang and Kaeng Kankabao," with massive whirlpools so fearsome that even experienced oarsmen had to be extremely cautious. He concluded that traveling on the Mekong was not enjoyable but rather strange and intriguing.

His overland journey from Mukdahan to Yasothon began on the morning of January 21, riding through hills interspersed with rice fields, cutting through large, important moist forests, particularly "Dong Bang I," a dense, dark forest resembling Dong Phaya Yen, full of large takian and yang trees. Travel was difficult due to narrow, stump-filled paths. This forest served as a geographic boundary between Monthon Udon and Monthon Isan, with Phu Thai ethnic groups living in the middle of the forest, such as at Ban Na Ko. On January 22, he led the procession through rocky plains and emerged from Dong Bang I at Nong Phok subdistrict, entering Senangkhanikhom District, Mueang Ubon Ratchathani (Monthon Isan), where he praised the well-maintained roads of Monthon Isan.

On January 23, he crossed "Lam Nam Se," the boundary between Senangkhanikhom District and Yasothon City, entering "Dong Samakang" (or Phu Samakang), a smaller forest with smooth terrain, rich in beautiful timber and "yam pha" wood (popularly used by Europeans for cigar boxes). Phu Thai people who had migrated from Mueang Tapon waited to receive him along the route. From January 24, he passed through various communities such as Ban Na Hi, Ban Kham Lai, and Ban Na Sum, and on the morning of January 25, rode through scenic hills and rice fields, passing large ponds and villages, arriving safely at Mueang Yasothon at 10:30 AM, concluding his pioneering overland journey through the forests of Mueang Mukdahan that week.

==== Prince Watthana's inspection visit (late 1906) ====
During the administrative reform period transitioning to the thesaphiban system, around late 1906 to early 1907, Prince Watthana, while serving as Governor of Monthon Udon, conducted an inspection tour to organize administration and establish the district system replacing the traditional city governance in Mueang Mukdahan.

This visit occurred after Phra Chanthathep Suriyawong (Saeng), the governor of Mueang Mukdahan, passed away in May 1906, leaving the city without a ruler. "Khun Chanthamuk" (later Phra Chanthasrisurach) was entrusted with organizing the reception, demonstrating his capabilities in preparing travel distances and constructing suitable accommodations, much to Prince Watthana's satisfaction.

After completing his inspection at the Mukdahan city hall, the prince proceeded overland to "Mueang Nong Sung," home to the Phu Thai ethnic group, and traveled to the "Ban Na Kae" area. Upon careful observation and consideration of the location, he deemed this area highly suitable and more convenient for administration than the original Nong Sung city hall. He directly ordered Khun Chanthamuk:

"...Chanthamuk, I will appoint you as the district chief of Nong Sung. Prepare yourself and prepare to move the Nong Sung city administration to establish a district at Ban Na Kae..."

This royal directive and administrative decision led the Ministry of Interior to relocate the Nong Sung city hall to Ban Na Kae in 1907. Initially, it retained the name "Nong Sung District" before being renamed Na Kae District to align with the local geography (now part of Nakhon Phanom province).

The original Nong Sung city area, after its administrative center was relocated, was later re-established as "Nong Sung District" when the population grew and the area developed, remaining an important district of Mukdahan province to this day.

==== Establishment of the province ====
The concept of separating Mukdahan District to establish a new province first materialized in 1975 when Chaloem Yot Saen Wiset, then a member of parliament for Nakhon Phanom province, proposed legislation to parliament. However, the process was not completed due to political instability at the time. Later, under the government of General Prem Tinsulanonda, the Ministry of Interior submitted the draft Act Establishing Mukdahan Province to parliament as a cabinet-initiated bill.

In parliamentary deliberations, members overwhelmingly agreed, citing three key supporting reasons:

(1) Administrative efficiency: Nakhon Phanom province had extensive border territories and a large population. Separating the area to establish a new province would improve public administration.

(2) Security: Mukdahan is a border area adjacent to Savannakhet province in Laos. A provincial-level administrative center would enable closer oversight of border security and order.

(3) Public convenience: Mukdahan and nearby districts were far from Nakhon Phanom's provincial center, requiring difficult and time-consuming travel for government services. The new province would reduce hardship and bring state services closer to the people.

The bill passed parliamentary approval, and King Bhumibol Adulyadej the Great signed the Act on August 19, 1982. It was published in the Royal Gazette, Volume 99, Section 121 (Special Edition), on August 27, 1982, and took effect one month after publication, making September 27, 1982 the official establishment date of Mukdahan province.

The Act stipulated that Mukdahan District, Khamcha-i District, Don Tan District, Nikhom Kham Soi District, Dong Luang Sub-district, and Wan Yai Sub-district be separated from Nakhon Phanom province and established as Mukdahan province. Mukdahan District was renamed Mueang Mukdahan District.

Mukdahan thus became the 73rd province of Thailand, with September 27 celebrated annually as "Mukdahan Province Establishment Day."

=== Contemporary Mukdahan period ===
==== Administrative reform and provincial elevation ====
Following the 1894 administrative reform from the traditional city-state system to the Monthon thesaphiban system, Mueang Mukdahan was placed under the supervision of Monthon Udon. Later, during the reign of King Vajiravudh, another major administrative reorganization occurred in 1916, converting "city" (mueang) level units to "province" (changwat) and "district" (amphoe) as appropriate.

This restructuring demoted Mueang Mukdahan, which had maintained independent city status for 137 years, to Mukdahan District, under the administration of Nakhon Phanom province (to which it had already been attached since 1907).

In 1933, although the government abolished the Monthon thesaphiban system to reorganize regional administration, the area remained a district under Nakhon Phanom province for 75 years until its elevation and separation to establish Mukdahan province on September 27, 1982.

==== Significant contemporary events ====
Following provincial establishment, infrastructure and public spirit development continued. On September 27, 1984, the Mukdahan City Pillar Shrine was consecrated in front of the provincial hall (Soi Song Nang Sathit), with King Vajiralongkorn (then Crown Prince) presiding over the cornerstone-laying ceremony.

On December 20, 2006, the Second Thai–Lao Friendship Bridge was officially opened to connect transportation and the economy between Mukdahan and Savannakhet. King Bhumibol Adulyadej the Great graciously appointed Princess Maha Chakri Sirindhorn as his representative to preside over the bridge opening ceremony, jointly with Boungnang Vorachit, then Vice President of the Lao People's Democratic Republic.

On April 18, 2024, Princess Maha Chakri Sirindhorn made a personal visit to inspect the progress of the Huai Bang Sai Upper Basin Development Project under Royal Initiative in Dong Luang District.

On April 18, 2025, Princess Maha Chakri Sirindhorn presided over the opening of the new Mukdahan Provincial Red Cross Office building in Mueang Mukdahan District.

On July 2, 2026, ten monks were killed and 13 others were injured, including two critically, when an 11-year-old boy crashed his parents' pickup truck into a pilgrimage walk in Mukdahan province, Thailand

== Geography ==
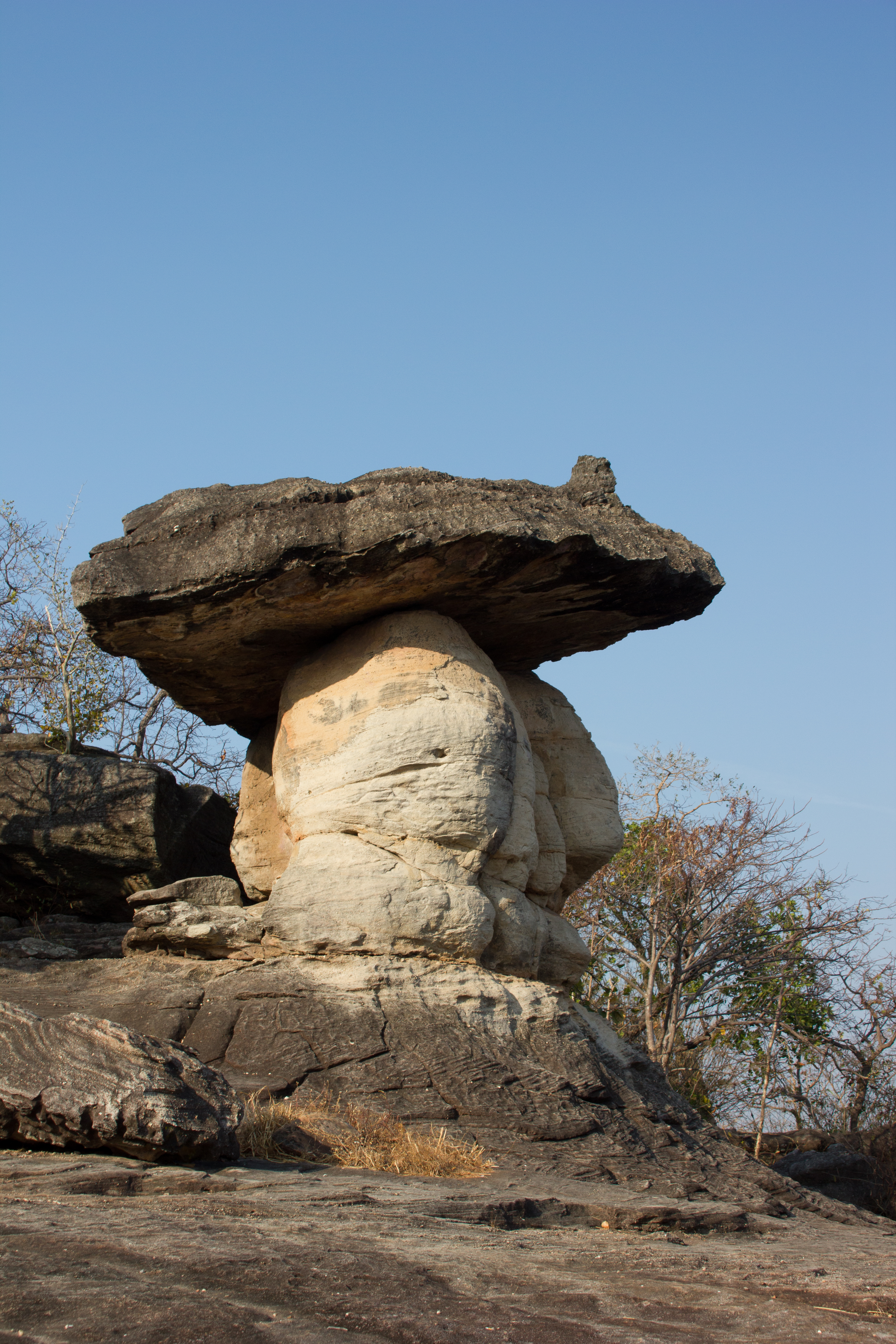
Rock formations in Phu Pha Thoep National Park, reflecting the province's distinctive topography

=== Topography ===
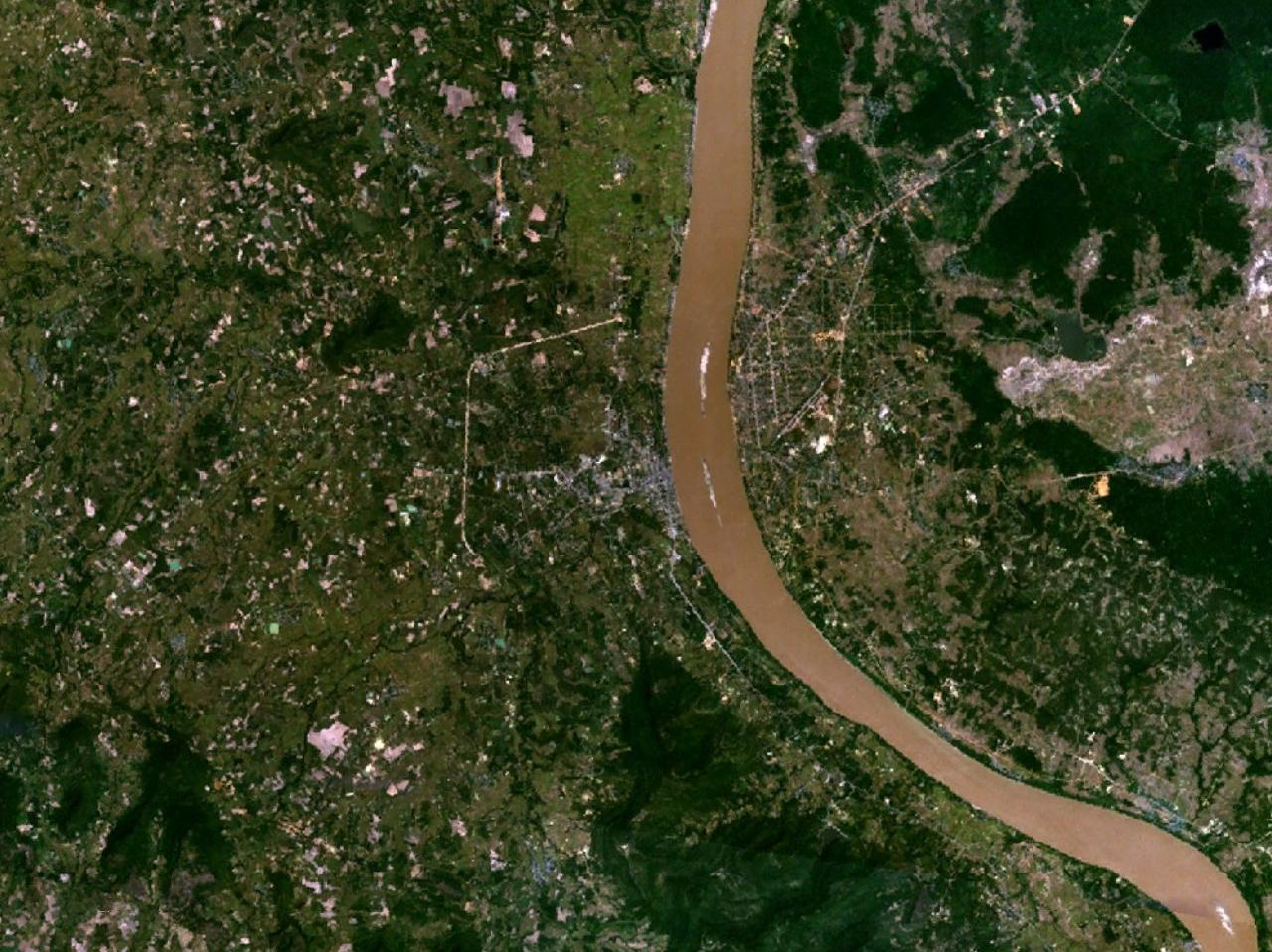
Satellite image of Mukdahan province in 2005, showing topographic features, by NASA, USA

The northern and southern parts of the province are plateaus. To the west lies the Phu Phan Mountains, characterized by sparse to dense forests. The eastern part consists of plains interspersed with forests, with the Mekong River serving as the natural border between Thailand and the Lao People's Democratic Republic, stretching approximately 72 kilometers. Plains account for 20 percent of the provincial area. Natural resources are abundant, with forest area approximately 953,300 rai, representing 35.15 percent of the provincial area.

Mukdahan province shares borders with:

- North: Sakon Nakhon province and Nakhon Phanom province
- East: Savannakhet province, Laos, with the Mekong River forming the boundary
- South: Amnat Charoen province, Yasothon province, and Roi Et province
- West: Roi Et province and Kalasin province

==== Highest points ====
Phu Pha San is the highest peak in Mukdahan province, a tourist attraction and scenic viewpoint challenging for eco-tourists. At 617 meters above sea level, it is located in the Dong Phu Sithan National Reserved Forest, near Ban Mad, Ban Lao Subdistrict, Khamcha-i District, approximately 10 kilometers from Khamcha-i and 42 kilometers from Mukdahan town. The base area connects to the Phu Pha Mueang Wildlife Sanctuary.

Phu Chom Si is the highest peak within Phu Pha Thoep National Park, covering Mueang Mukdahan District and Don Tan District, at approximately 420–460 meters above sea level.

===== Lowest points =====
Lowland areas and Mekong riverbanks (covering Wan Yai District, Mueang Mukdahan District, and Don Tan District) have elevations below 200 meters above sea level, with the lowest points along the Mekong riverbank at approximately 130–140 meters above sea level.

==== Climate ====
The climate characteristics are as follows:

- Summer: Mid-February to mid-May. Cold air masses or high-pressure systems clash with hot air masses, causing thunderstorms, strong winds, or summer storms, which can cause damage.
- Rainy season: Mid-May to mid-October. There is a rain break around late June to early July. Rainfall comes from the southwest monsoon bringing moisture, and from rain troughs or low-pressure systems passing east-west, causing widespread thunderstorms. The heaviest rainfall comes from tropical cyclones from the South China Sea, approximately 2–3 per year, causing widespread rain.
- Winter: Mid-October to mid-February. Cold air masses or high-pressure systems from China cover the area, causing generally cold and dry weather.

Due to its border with Laos, Mukdahan's climate resembles that of the Lao side. In December, maximum temperatures typically stay below 30 °C, providing comfortable weather. The rainy season runs from May to September, with August receiving the most rainfall. The hottest period is April, at the end of the dry season.

Rainfall, relative humidity, and average temperatures for 2008–2010 in Mukdahan province
Category	2008	2009	2010
Annual rainfall (mm)	1,400.10	1,212.00	1,740.60
Annual rainy days (days)	133	106	110
Maximum average relative humidity (%)	95.58	95.17	94.17
Minimum average relative humidity (%)	43.50	39.33	36.58
Average relative humidity (%)	74.23	71.98	70.62
Maximum average temperature (°C)	35.68	36.38	36.77
Minimum average temperature (°C)	18.58	18.99	19.34
Average temperature (°C)	25.86	27.68	28.20

Climate data for Mukdahan (1981–2010)
Month	Jan	Feb	Mar	Apr	May	Jun	Jul	Aug	Sep	Oct	Nov	Dec	Year
Mean daily maximum °C (°F)	30.4 (86.7)	32.7 (90.9)	35.1 (95.2)	36.1 (97.0)	34.5 (94.1)	32.9 (91.2)	32.4 (90.3)	31.8 (89.2)	32.0 (89.6)	31.7 (89.1)	30.7 (87.3)	29.2 (84.6)	32.5 (90.4)
Mean daily minimum °C (°F)	16.4 (61.5)	19.1 (66.4)	22.3 (72.1)	24.6 (76.3)	24.9 (76.8)	25.0 (77.0)	24.7 (76.5)	24.4 (75.9)	24.1 (75.4)	22.5 (72.5)	19.7 (67.5)	16.7 (62.1)	22.0 (71.7)
Average rainfall mm (inches)	3.7 (0.15)	17.4 (0.69)	38.8 (1.53)	76.4 (3.01)	199.5 (7.85)	233.4 (9.19)	231.9 (9.13)	350.7 (13.81)	211.7 (8.33)	100.6 (3.96)	13.3 (0.52)	2.6 (0.10)	1,480 (58.27)
Average rainy days (≥ 1 mm)	1	2	4	7	16	18	18	22	17	9	2	0	116
Average relative humidity (%)	67	65	62	65	75	79	81	84	82	77	71	69	73
Source: Thai Meteorological Department

==== Strategic location potential ====
Mukdahan is a border province adjacent to the Lao PDR and situated at the midpoint of the East–West Economic Corridor (EWEC), with the Second Thai–Lao Friendship Bridge serving as the connection point. This makes it a trade and cultural link to countries in the subregion with high trade demand, including Lao PDR, Vietnam, and China. The EWEC route begins at Mawlamyine in Myanmar, enters Thailand at Mae Sot District, Tak Province, passes through Khon Kaen province to Mukdahan, crosses the Second Friendship Bridge to Savannakhet province, Lao PDR, along Route 9 where the Savan–Seno Special Economic Zone is located, connects to the Lao Bao Special Economic Zone in Vietnam, enters Route 1 to Da Nang port, and can extend to northern Vietnam and southern China's Chongzuo Special Economic Zone in Guangxi Zhuang Autonomous Region, with Nanning as the main city, serving a population of over 100 million as a major market for Mukdahan's goods. The EWEC route from Mukdahan to Da Nang and Da Nang deep-sea port in Vietnam is approximately 527 kilometers, passing through Lao PDR from the Second Friendship Bridge at Kaysone Phomvihane, Savannakhet province, along Route 9 through the Savan–Seno Special Economic Zone at Uthumphon District, Phalangxay District, Phin District, ending at Dansavanh, Sepon District, Lao–Vietnam border at Lao Bao, approximately 247 kilometers, all asphalt two-lane road. Entering Vietnam from Lao Bao at the Lao Bao Special Economic Zone, Quang Tri Province, connecting to Vietnam's Route 1 at Dong Ha, Quang Tri Province, 80 kilometers, then south to Hue and Da Nang deep-sea port, 200 kilometers, all asphalt two-lane road.

The EWEC route from Mukdahan can connect to Chongzuo, Nanning, China, at 1,347 kilometers: Mukdahan to Dong Ha, Quang Tri Province, Vietnam, 327 kilometers; from Dong Ha north through Dong Hoi, Quang Binh Province, Ha Tinh Province, Vinh, Nghe An Province, Thanh Hoa Province, Ninh Binh Province, to Hanoi, 620 kilometers, all asphalt two-lane road. Travel from Mukdahan requires an overnight stop at Vinh, Nghe An Province. This route connects to southern China from Hanoi through Lang Son, Vietnam's border city, 165 kilometers, entering China at Youyi Pass, to Pingxiang, through Chongzuo, to Nanning, Guangxi Province, 230 kilometers.

== Politics and administration ==
=== Regional administration ===
The province is divided into 7 districts (amphoe), 53 subdistricts (tambon), and 526 villages (muban).

Map

No.	District name	Number of subdistricts	Area (km²)
1	Mueang Mukdahan District	13	1,235.066
2	Nikhom Kham Soi District	7	377.158
3	Don Tan District	7	510.923
4	Dong Luang District	6	1,076.158
5	Khamcha-i District	9	645.694
6	Wan Yai District	5	84.483
7	Nong Sung District	6	410.384
Total		53	4,339.830

==== Local administration ====
The province has 1 Provincial Administrative Organization (PAO), 30 Subdistrict Administrative Organizations (SAO), 1 town municipality, and 24 subdistrict municipalities, as shown in the following table:

Population data by municipality in Mukdahan province
No.	Municipality name	District	Subdistricts covered			Population (as of December 2025)
No.	Municipality name	District	Entire	Partial	Total	Population (as of December 2025)
City municipalities (none in Mukdahan)
Town municipalities
1	Mukdahan Town Municipality	Mueang Mukdahan	Mukdahan Subdistrict	Si Bunrueang Subdistrict	2	33,010
Subdistrict municipalities
1	Dong Yen Subdistrict Municipality	Mueang Mukdahan	Dong Yen Subdistrict	–	1	10,723
2	Kham Ahuan Subdistrict Municipality	Mueang Mukdahan	Kham Ahuan Subdistrict	–	1	13,006
3	Muk Subdistrict Municipality	Mueang Mukdahan	Muk Subdistrict	–	1	26,355
4	Bang Sai Yai Subdistrict Municipality	Mueang Mukdahan	Bang Sai Yai Subdistrict	–	1	9,150
5	Phon Sai Subdistrict Municipality	Mueang Mukdahan	Phon Sai Subdistrict	–	1	8,565
6	Phueng Daet Subdistrict Municipality	Mueang Mukdahan	Phueng Daet Subdistrict	–	1	5,591
7	Kham Pa Lai Subdistrict Municipality	Mueang Mukdahan	Kham Pa Lai Subdistrict	–	1	13,055
8	Dong Mon Subdistrict Municipality	Mueang Mukdahan	Dong Mon Subdistrict	–	1	5,598
9	Na Sok Subdistrict Municipality	Mueang Mukdahan	Na Sok Subdistrict	–	1	10,266
10	Na Si Nuan Subdistrict Municipality	Mueang Mukdahan	Na Si Nuan Subdistrict	–	1	8,551
11	Nikhom Kham Soi Subdistrict Municipality	Nikhom Kham Soi	-	Nikhom Kham Soi, Na Kok, Chok Chai Subdistricts	3	6,034
12	Rom Klao Subdistrict Municipality	Nikhom Kham Soi	Rom Klao Subdistrict	–	1	3,297
13	Don Tan Subdistrict Municipality	Don Tan	Don Tan Subdistrict	–	1	2,403
14	Ban Kaeng Subdistrict Municipality	Don Tan	Ban Kaeng Subdistrict	–	1	3,076
15	Don Tan Pha Suk Subdistrict Municipality	Don Tan	-	Don Tan Subdistrict	1	4,490
16	Dong Luang Subdistrict Municipality	Dong Luang	Dong Luang Subdistrict	–	1	8,221
17	Nong Khaen Subdistrict Municipality	Dong Luang	Nong Khaen Subdistrict	–	1	5,222
18	Kok Tum Subdistrict Municipality	Dong Luang	Kok Tum Subdistrict	–	1	9,392
19	Khamcha-i Subdistrict Municipality	Khamcha-i	Nam Thiang Subdistrict	–	1	2,241
20	Wan Yai Subdistrict Municipality	Wan Yai	Wan Yai Subdistrict	–	1	4,904
21	Chanot Subdistrict Municipality	Wan Yai	Chanot Subdistrict	–	1	2,789
22	Phu Wong Subdistrict Municipality	Nong Sung	Phu Wong Subdistrict	–	1	2,735
23	Ban Pao Subdistrict Municipality	Nong Sung	Ban Pao Subdistrict	–	1	3,311
24	Nong Sung Nuea Subdistrict Municipality	Nong Sung	Nong Sung Nuea Subdistrict	–	1	2,671
Source: Department of Provincial Administration, Ministry of Interior

=== List of governors and city rulers ===
For rulers before 1898, see Mueang Mukdahan. For district chiefs after 1982, see Mueang Mukdahan District.

==== Governors of Mueang Mukdahan ====
No.	Name	Term	Notes
1	Phra Phakdi Nuchit (Chan Inthrakhamhaeng Na Ratchasima) (later Phraya Suriyadet Wiset Rit and Phraya Kamhaeng Songkhram)	1893–1895	Following the Paknam crisis of 1893, when Siam lost territory on the left bank of the Mekong to France, King Chulalongkorn appointed Phra Phakdi Nuchit as the first governor of Mueang Mukdahan under the Monthon system. His mission was to supervise administration, advise the city ruler, and maintain stability along the geopolitically sensitive border. During his service, he faced structural power limitations, as judicial and criminal authority over officials was largely controlled by the French, as seen in the Oath of Allegiance ceremony at the city pillar—an important ritual for demonstrating loyalty to the king. The French prohibited their subjects from crossing the Mekong to participate, reflecting both diplomatic sensitivity and challenges to Siamese authority. In 1897, he received a royal appointment as "Phraya Suriyadet Wiset Rit," Deputy Governor of Nakhon Ratchasima. While traveling from Mukdahan to his new post via the Mekong to Nong Khai and Ban Mak Khaeng (Udon Thani), his party was arrested by French forces at Ban Nong Doen, Bueng Kan area, on charges of trespassing into Lao territory in violation of international agreements. He was detained in Savannakhet for four months. During this time, he secretly corresponded with Prince Prachaksinlapakhom, the Governor of Monthon Udon, demonstrating his sense of duty and loyalty. While detained, the 15th day of the 11th lunar month—the day of the oath ceremony—he requested to cross the Mekong to participate, but was refused. This conflict between duty and external constraints caused him such distress that he wept all day. The next day, Mukdahan officials negotiated a visit and brought the oath water across to him. He knelt, facing the Grand Palace, paid homage, and drank the sacred water, declaring his loyalty before French soldiers. After release, he advanced in his career. In 1902, he received the rank of Colonel Phraya Kamhaeng Songkhram, Governor of Nakhon Ratchasima and Governor-General of Monthon Nakhon Ratchasima. These events reflect the intense dynamics of border power and diplomatic challenges in the era of nation-building amid Western imperial threats.
—	Vacant	1895–1899	After Phra Phakdi Nuchit's departure, no new governor was appointed until Khun Phithak Thurakit in 1899.
2	Khun Phithak Thurakit (Chuan Sakunwet) (later Luang Phalana Nantakit)	1899–1901	Served in finance, taxation, and local administration reform, during a time when Mukdahan's territory extended to Phra That Phanom (Monthon Udon). Later promoted to Luang Phalana Nantakit.
3	Phra Anuchat Wutthathikhun (Pae Na Nongkhai)	1901–1907	Transferred from Chief of Phen District to succeed Khun Phithak Thurakit. The last governor before the Ministry of Interior abolished Mueang Mukdahan and reduced it to a district.
Mueang Mukdahan abolished and became Mukdahan District under Mueang Nakhon Phanom, Monthon Udon

==== List of governors and district chiefs ====
No.	Name	Term	Notes
Governors of Mueang Mukdahan
1	Phra Chanthathep Suriyawong (Saeng Chanthasakha)	1901 – May 1906	De facto city ruler. (Note: Historical records in History of Provincial Administration, Mukdahan, Ministry of Education textbook, and official provincial documents consistently state that Mukdahan had 8 city rulers. Although Phra Chanthathep Suriyawong (Saeng) was not formally appointed "city ruler" but rather "city governor," the Ministry of Interior's tradition still counted him in the city's succession. He was the last governor under the old system. After his death in May 1906, the Ministry abolished Mukdahan's city status and reduced it to a district the following year.<ref name=":15">"เอกสารเสด็จตรวจราชการเสนาบดีกระทรวงมหาดไทย ร.ศ. 119 - 131 (พ.ศ. 2443 - 2455)" [Documents on the Inspection Tours of the Minister of Interior, R.S. 119–131 (1900–1912)]. Fine Arts Department.)
District chiefs of Mueang Mukdahan (under Mueang Nakhon Phanom, Monthon Udon, 1907 – May 18, 1916)
1	Luang Song Sarawut (Choem Wisetrat) (later Phra Borihan Ratcha-ana Khet, Phraya Samut Sakda Rak)	October 1, 1907 – 1915	First district chief of Mueang Mukdahan. (Note: The name "Mueang Mukdahan District" was used during 1898–1916 and 1982–present. During 1916–1982, "Mukdahan District" was used. The Ministry of Interior announced the uniform change of "city" to "province" throughout the kingdom on May 19, 1916.) Later moved to become the first governor of Nong Khai province. Converted to Roman Catholic Christianity. Later received the title Phraya Samut Sakda Rak, served as Governor of Samut Songkhram, and returned as Governor of Nakhon Phanom (1926–1929). Mukdahan Town Municipality named Samut Sakda Rak Road and Wiset Mukdarak Soi in his honor.
2	Khun Phadung Nikhom Khet (Yosae Nakhathat / Yiam Ekkasit) (later Luang Phadung Nikhom Khet, Amatyai Ek Phra Pathum Thewaphibal)	1915–1923	Later received the title Phra Prathum Thewaphibal, moved to serve as Governor of Nong Khai, and served as Director of the Department of Interior (Department of Provincial Administration). His title "Phadung Nikhom Khet" was used to name a road in Mukdahan Town Municipality.
District chiefs of Mukdahan District (under Nakhon Phanom Province, Monthon Udon, May 19, 1916 – 1933)
3	Rong Amatyai Ek Luang Wiwit Surakan (Thawin Chiamanop)	1923–1933	Former deputy chief of Wang Saphung District. Later served as Governor of Loei and Udon Thani, Deputy Director of the Department of Interior, and MP for Udon Thani. His title "Wiwit Surakan" was used to name Highway 2029 in Mukdahan Town Municipality.
District chiefs of Mukdahan District (after the abolition of Monthon system in 1933, under Nakhon Phanom Province, 1933–1982)
4	Luang Borihan Chonnabot (San Sihaitrai)	1933–1939	Historical records indicate he established a school on May 19, 1937. Later moved to serve as Governor of Phra Nakhon Si Ayutthaya and Maha Sarakham. His title "Borihan Chonnabot" was used to name a soi in Mukdahan Town Municipality.
6	Khun Worakit Koson (Lt. Thawin Rawangphai)	1939–1940	Served as district chief and first chief of Mukdahan Customs Post, established in 1939.
5	Choon Nokkaew	1940	Founder of Ban Sam Kham Mitraphap 3 School on May 1, 1938, and served as Customs Chief ex officio.
7	Lt. Col. Luang Yutthakan Kamchon (Paek Sangkluk)	1940–1942	Former chief of Nang Rong District. Served during the tragic Martyrs of Songkhon incident and also served as Customs Chief.
8	Suphat Wongwatthana	1942–1943	
9	Yut Thunphakdi	1944–1946	
10	Kasem Chiraphan	1947	
11	Phuang Suwannarat	1947–1948	Served during the period of mass Vietnamese migration to Thailand before the Vietnam War. As district chief responsible for managing migrants, he allowed some Vietnamese refugees to work at his residence.
12	Phinit Phothiphan	1948–1949	
13	Sanga Thaiyannon	1950–1952	In 1952, requested to rename Mukdalai School to "Mukdawittayalai" but was not granted royal permission. His surname was used to name Thaiyannon Road in Mukdahan Town Municipality.
14	Chu Sanga Ritthiprasat	1953–1954	
15	Charoen Panthong	1955–1957	
16	Sitthi Na Nakhon Phanom	1958–1960	Descendant of the old ruling family of Nakhon Phanom on the Mekong. Later moved to become chief of Kantharalak District, Sisaket.
17	Wichian Wetsawan	1960–1961	Transferred from Deputy Governor of Sakon Nakhon. Later served as Governor of multiple provinces and Deputy Minister of Interior.
18	Roem Sawatwongchai	1961–1964	
19	Pathom Sutthiwat Naphuphat	1965	Later moved to serve as Deputy Governor of Nakhon Phanom.
20	Montri Trakngan	1966–1967	Served during border security operations. Was wounded by gunfire during a clash with insurgents in Dong Yen area.
21	Sueb Rotprasert	1968–1969	
22	Prakit Uttamot	1970–1971	
23	Somphap Sriworakhan	1972–1974	Initiated formation of mass forces to counter communist insurgents. Later served as Governor of Chaiyaphum.
24	Major Prida Nissaycharoen	1975–1978	
25	2nd Lt. Sanan Thanirot	1979	
26	Sub-Lt. Sunai Na Ubon R.N. (Note: R.N. stands for Royal Thai Navy, used as a suffix for commissioned naval officers' names (from Sub-Lieutenant upward) to indicate official affiliation.)	1979–1980	
27	2nd Lt. Niran Ying-aruntham	1980–1982	Served as the last district chief of Mukdahan District both before and after its elevation to Mukdahan province in 1982, and continued as the first chief of Mueang Mukdahan District until 1983.
Mukdahan District ended on September 26, 1982, and was elevated to province on September 27, 1982, under the Act Establishing Mukdahan Province, 1982.

==== List of Governors of Mukdahan Province ====
No.	Name	Term
1	Chamlong Ratprasert	September 27, 1982 – September 30, 1985
2	Thanom Channuwong	October 1, 1985 – September 30, 1991
3	Lt. Maitri Naiyakun	October 1, 1991 – September 30, 1992
4	Anan Chaengklip	October 1, 1992 – September 30, 1993
5	2nd Lt. Winai Bunyaratphalin	October 1, 1993 – September 30, 1994
6	Sarot Khatchamat	October 1, 1994 – October 19, 1997
7	Songwut Ngammeesri	October 21, 1997 – January 11, 1998
8	Somboon Suksamran	January 12, 1998 – September 30, 1999
9	Prasert Yotheephithak	October 1, 1999 – September 30, 2001
10	Niran Chongwuttiwet	October 1, 2001 – September 30, 2004
11	Pairat Sakonphan	October 1, 2004 – September 30, 2005
12	Boonsom Phirinyuang	October 1, 2005 – September 30, 2007
13	Pranet Boonmee	October 1, 2007 – September 30, 2009
14	Boonsong Techamanesathit	October 1, 2009 – May 26, 2010
15	Chanwit Wasayangkun	May 27, 2010 – September 30, 2012
16	Sakonsasit Boonpradit	November 19, 2012 – September 30, 2015
17	Sonsit Ritsornkrai	October 1, 2015 – September 30, 2017
18	Phaithun Rukprathet	October 1, 2017 – September 30, 2018
19	Chayan Sirimat	October 1, 2018 – September 30, 2020
20	Weerachai Nakmat	October 1, 2020 – September 30, 2021
21	Chaloemphon Mangkhang	October 1, 2021 – September 30, 2022
22	Worayan Bunnarat	December 2, 2022 – present

==== List of Mukdahan Provincial Administrative Organization Chiefs ====
No.	Name	Term	Notes
1	Malairak Thongpha	2008–2012; May 12, 2013 – September 29, 2013	Served 2 terms (Independent group)
—	Vacant (no record of holder)	September 29, 2013 – December 19, 2020	No evidence of office holder during this period
2	Pol. Lt. Chit Sriyoha Mukdathanaphong	December 20, 2020 – 2024	Pheu Thai Party (term ended)
3	Weeraphong Thongpha	February 2, 2025 – present	Won 2025 election (Independent group)

== Provincial symbols ==
=== Seal and sacred symbols ===
Mukdahan Provincial Seal

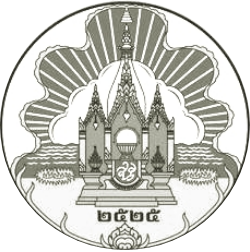
(Line art)

(Colored)

Provincial seal: A circular design with a border. Inside are three sacred and symbolic elements reflecting the province's history:

- Prasat Song Nang Sathit: A three-spired palace, with the central spire tallest, enshrining the "Mukdahan Gem" (Kaew Mukdahan)—a legendary gem believed to have appeared during the city's founding. The gem rests on a golden tray with a divine cloth, accompanied by the provincial abbreviation. The side spires contain "Bai Si Entalum An" (read: bai-si-yon-ta-lum-an), sacred offering vessels of the Isan people.
- Mukdahan Gem: A legendary gem from the Navaratna (nine-gem) tradition, believed to have appeared during the city's founding. It symbolizes brightness and prosperity, giving the province its name.
- Phra That Phanom: Standing behind the Prasat Song Nang Sathit, it represents the long shared history of Mukdahan and Nakhon Phanom as cities within the ancient Sri Kotrabun Kingdom. When Mueang Mukdahan was founded, Chao Chanthakinnaree settled on the site of an ancient abandoned city from the Sri Kotrabun era. The stupa serves as a spiritual center, indicating that Mukdahan and Nakhon Phanom have shared Phra That Phanom as a sacred symbol since ancient times and have been sister cities through all eras.
- Background elements: Behind Phra That Phanom is the "Mekong River." To the east, the sun shines through clouds, symbolizing the border province that receives the first sunlight in the region. The base of the palace displays the number "2525" (1982 CE), the year the Act Establishing Mukdahan Province took effect.

==== Provincial flag ====
Mukdahan Provincial Flag

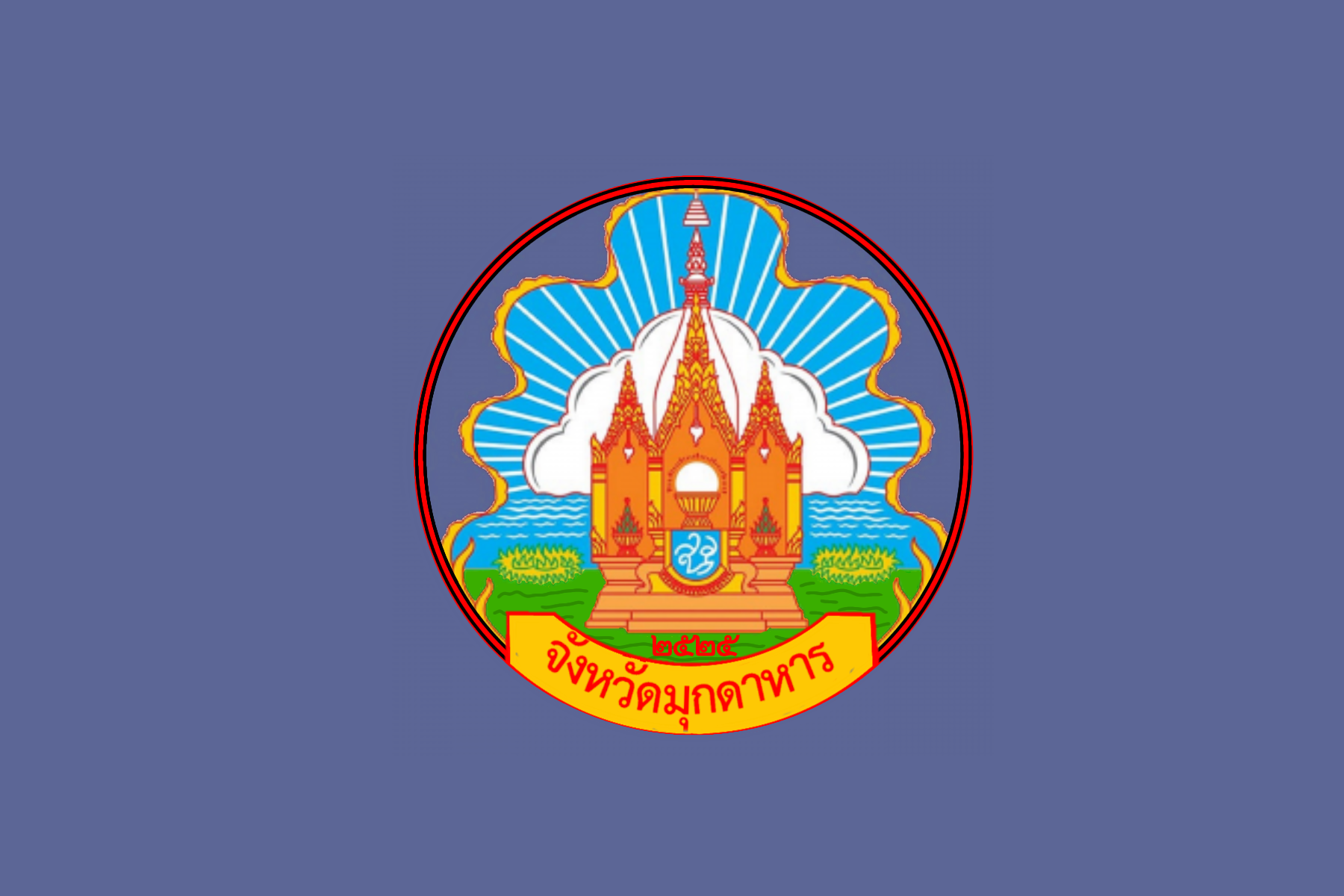
(Original)

(Current)

The provincial flag consists of three main elements:

1. Background: Misty white (gray) color 2. Border: Red stripes on three sides, leaving the hoist side plain 3. Center: The provincial seal featuring the "Prasat Song Nang Sathit" with the Mukdahan Gem, with Phra That Phanom in the background

==== Provincial flora and fauna ====
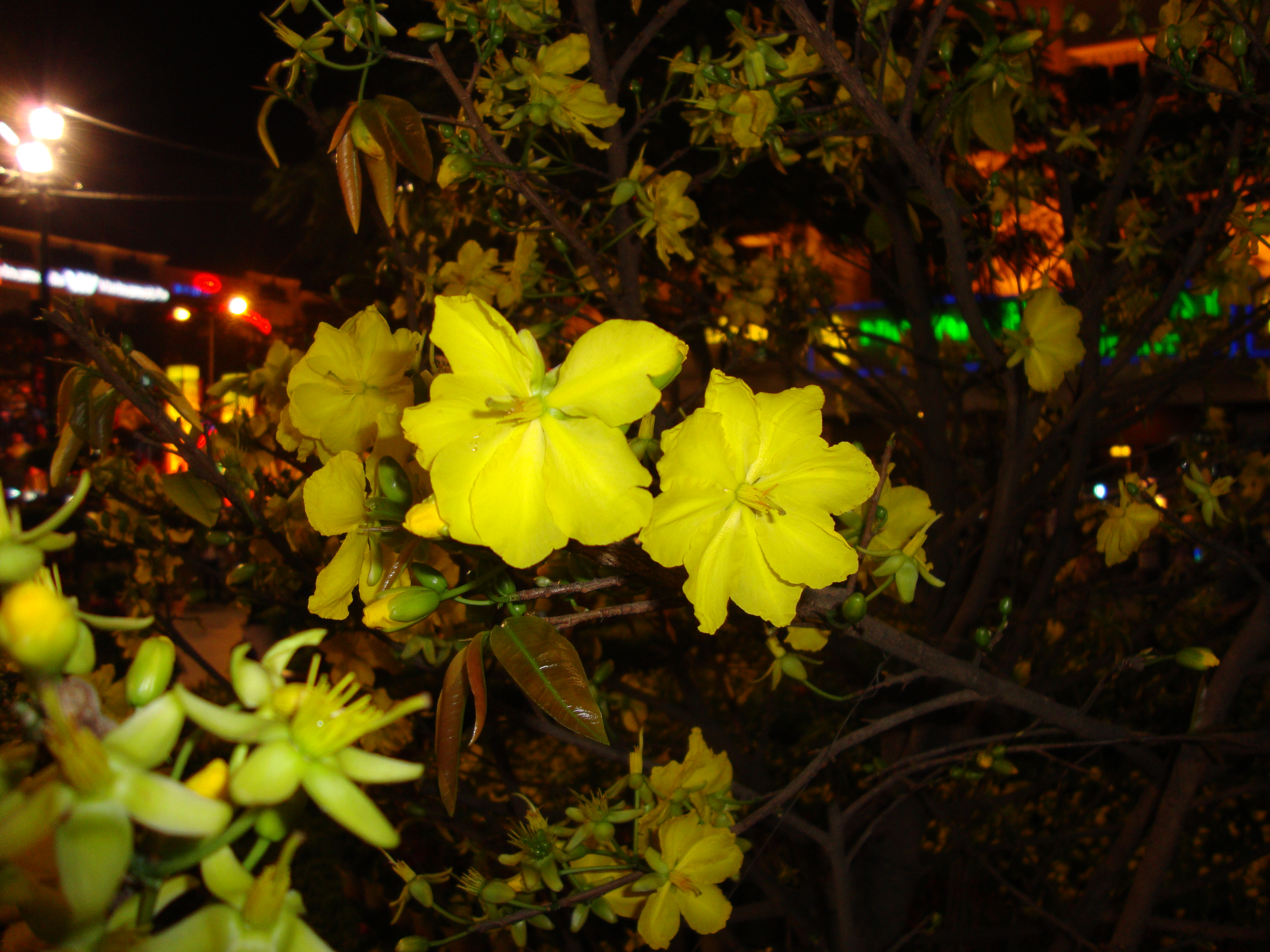
Chang Naw flower (Ochna integerrima), the provincial flower of Mukdahan

- Provincial tree: Ochna integerrima, locally known as Tan Lueang or Chang Naw. A hardwood tree commonly found in the dry dipterocarp forests of the province, symbolizing strength, endurance, and the indigenous people's connection to nature. While the Royal Institute designates the Ti tree (Cratoxylum formosum) as the provincial tree, the provincial government and the Royal Forest Department officially recognize the Chang Naw as both the provincial tree and flower. It is a royal auspicious tree.
- Provincial flower: Golden-yellow flowers blooming during the dry season and Songkran festival, symbolizing prosperity, brightness, and auspiciousness.

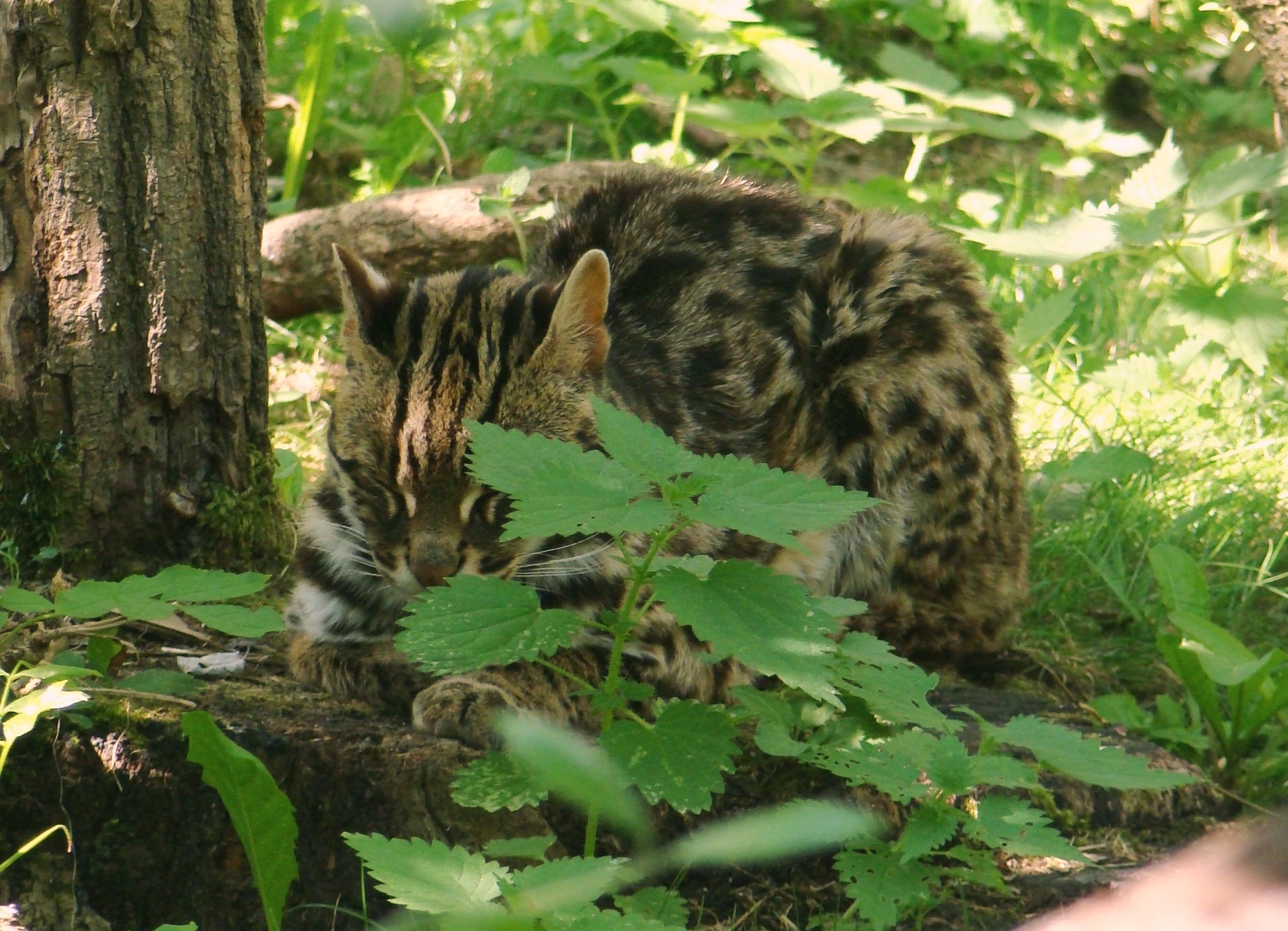
Leopard cat, the provincial land animal of Mukdahan

- Provincial land animal: Leopard cat (Prionailurus bengalensis). A protected wild animal found in Mukdahan's forests, such as Phu Pha Thoep National Park. Its designation reflects the province's ecological richness, biodiversity, and commitment to forest conservation.

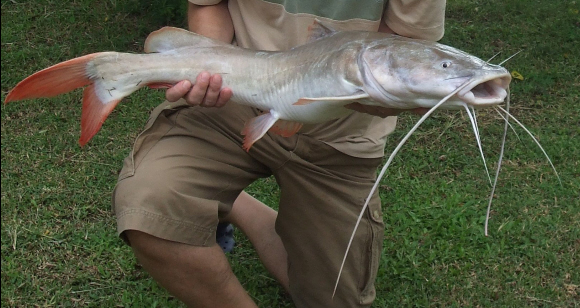
Asian redtail catfish, the provincial aquatic animal of Mukdahan

- Provincial aquatic animal: Asian redtail catfish (Hemibagrus wyckioides). A large freshwater fish found in the Mekong River, significant to the livelihood, economy, and food culture of Mukdahan's people. It symbolizes the abundance of the Mekong that has sustained the province's people for generations.

==== Provincial identity fabric ====
- Mudmee silk with Mukdahan gem pattern: A fabric design created and designated as the signature pattern of Mukdahan province. It is named after the "Mukdahan Gem," the sacred symbol from the city's founding (as depicted in the provincial seal). The mudmee pattern on the fabric reflects the gem's sparkle, symbolizing prosperity, peace, and the unity of the province's eight indigenous ethnic groups preserving their weaving traditions.

Note on cultural confusion: A common misunderstanding among tourists and the general public is confusing Mukdahan's provincial fabric with "Muk fabric." In fact, "Muk fabric" (a woven fabric with raised patterns resembling mother-of-pearl) is the signature fabric of Nakhon Phanom province. This confusion stems from Mukdahan having been a district under Nakhon Phanom for many years, leading people to associate the name "Muk" with Mukdahan by extension.

To clarify its distinct cultural identity, Mukdahan province has promoted "Mudmee silk with Mukdahan gem pattern" as its official provincial symbol, showcasing the refined mudmee weaving technique and affirming Mukdahan's unique local wisdom.

==== Provincial motto ====
The official provincial motto is: "Towering Ho Kaeo tower. Phu Pha Thoep and Kaeng Kabao. Eight local tribes. Famed sweet tamarinds. Amazing ancient drums. Home of the Lamphaya teachings. Spectacular Mekong riverfront. Connecting Indochina."

==== Original motto (1982–1996) ====
Upon its establishment in 1982, Mukdahan's motto was: "Beautiful Mekong city, excellent tamarinds, birthplace of Lam Phaya, spectacular Phu Pha Thoep, precious ancient drums, culture of eight tribes, charming Phu Manrom mountain view, splendid Kaeng Kabao."

==== Current motto (1996–present) ====
In 1996, with the construction of the Ho Kaeo Mukdahan Tower commemorating the Golden Jubilee, the motto was changed to the current one.

==== 2020 motto revision attempt ====
In 2020, Mukdahan province considered updating the motto to reflect new tourism contexts and landmarks, proposing a new motto: "Great Buddha image, magnificent and graceful, soaring Ho Kaeo Mukdahan Tower, the three-realm Naga, renowned throughout the land, the bridge connecting Indochina." A competition was held for the new motto. However, the judging committee determined that no submitted entry met the selection criteria to replace the original motto, as per the provincial announcement dated March 16, 2020. Therefore, Mukdahan never officially adopted a new motto and continues to use the original motto that encompasses the eight ethnic groups and traditional arts and culture.

==== 2022 motto controversy ====
On August 30, 2022, the motto revision issue resurfaced when the Mukdahan Provincial Public Relations Office announced a provincial meeting where consideration was given to changing the motto to be more modern and aligned with tourism promotion, reconsidering the previously proposed draft: "Great Buddha image, magnificent and graceful, soaring Ho Kaeo Mukdahan Tower, the three-realm Naga, renowned throughout the land, the bridge connecting Indochina."

This proposal reflected a marketing and tourism policy emphasizing new landmarks gaining popularity among tourists, such as Phra Phutthabat Phu Manrom (the "Great Buddha image") and Phaya Sri Mukda Maha Muni Nilpalanak (the "three-realm Naga").

However, the announcement sparked criticism from Mukdahan residents on social media on multiple grounds:

- Loss of cultural identity: Residents felt the new motto omitted the important "eight local tribes," as well as "ancient drums" and the "birthplace of Lamphaya"—the spiritual center and representatives of the ethnic groups that shape Mukdahan's identity.
- Emphasis on new constructions: The original motto referenced long-established natural attractions like Phu Pha Thoep and Kaeng Kabao, while the draft focused on new constructions that residents felt could not capture the province's true spirit as well as the original natural and historical sites.
- Lack of public participation: There were questions about whether the public had been consulted before considering changes to a significant provincial symbol.

In response to the public sentiment favoring preservation of the original identity, on the afternoon of August 31, 2022, the Provincial Public Relations Office edited its announcement, removing all text related to the proposed motto change. Mukdahan province thus continues to use its original motto to this day.

== Demographics ==
Mukdahan province population statistics
Year	Pop.	±%
1995	317,642	—
2000	325,000	+2.3%
2004	332,563	+2.3%
2010	346,016	+4.0%
2011	339,836	−1.8%
2013	343,647	+1.1%
2014	345,180	+0.4%
2015	353,733	+2.5%
2017	354,175	+0.1%
2018	354,242	+0.0%
2019	354,337	+0.0%
2020	351,595	−0.8%
2021	352,076	+0.1%
2022	352,938	+0.2%
2023	351,595	−0.4%
2024	351,437	−0.0%
2025	350,510	−0.3%
Source: Department of Provincial Administration, Ministry of Interior

=== Ethnic groups in Mukdahan ===
Mukdahan historically received significant migration and resettlement from the left bank of the Mekong, particularly after the Lao rebellion (1826–1828). King Rama III pursued a policy of relocating people to the right bank to secure their safety and weaken enemy forces. As a result, Mukdahan is an area of rich ethnic diversity, comprising eight main ethnic groups:

==== Eight Mukdahan Thai groups ====
1. Isan Thai: Thai-Lao people, the largest population group, descended from the Lan Xang Kingdom, settled along the Mekong, Chi, and Mun rivers.

2. Phu Thai: Originally from the Sipsong Chu Thai region and Mueang Wang and Mueang Tapon in Laos, they migrated across the Mekong to Nong Sung during King Rama III's reign. They traditionally wear handwoven dark or indigo-dyed clothing. Their distinctive beverage is Lao U (rice wine fermented in jars, drunk through bamboo straws). Found in Khamcha-i, Nong Sung, Dong Luang, and Nikhom Kham Soi districts.

3. Thai Kha (Bru): Indigenous Austroasiatic-speaking people who call themselves "Bru" (meaning mountain). Traditional Bru men wore loincloths, long hair to the shoulders, and headdresses of red cloth (legend says they used white cloth soaked in blood before death in battles with the Phu Thai). They were fierce warriors skilled in crossbows and poisoned darts. Found in Don Tan, Dong Luang, and Nikhom Kham Soi.

4. Thai Kaso: Originally from Mahachai (Khammouan), their language is related to Kha. They have dark skin and strong spiritual beliefs, expressed through the So Thang Bang ritual (using bamboo tubes pounded rhythmically into the ground while dancing to honor ancestors) and the Sang Kamut ritual (organizing the spirits of the deceased). They use the surname "Wong Kaso." Mostly found in Dong Luang.

5. Thai Kaleng: Related to Kha and Kaso, originally from Khammouan. Their legend explains their dark skin: the three chiefs used hot iron rods to pierce the "Namtao Pung" gourd, causing the first Kaleng people to be covered with soot. Men traditionally tattooed their bodies to the waist and bird shapes on their cheeks. Found in Na Sameng Subdistrict, Don Tan, and Khamcha-i.

6. Thai Saek: Originally from Mueang Saek (20 km from the Vietnamese border). Their language is a mix of Lao and Vietnamese. They have traditions similar to Vietnamese, such as the Trut Saek (Tet) ceremony on the first day of the third lunar month to honor the spirits of ancestors. Their famous dance is the Saek Ten Sak (bamboo pole dance).

7. Thai Yo: Migrated from Sipsongpanna and Mueang Hongsa (Laos), settling in Mueang Chaiyaburi and displaced during the Anouvong rebellion. Their language and accent differ from others. In Mukdahan, Thai Yo are found in Dong Yen Subdistrict, Mueang Mukdahan.

8. Kula: Originally itinerant Shan (Tai Yai) traders from the Shan State (Myanmar). Tall in stature, they traditionally wore sarongs or flared trousers and tall headwraps. They traveled to trade brassware, swords, and silk (the origin of the Thung Kula Ronghai legend). Many settled and married Phu Thai women, with descendants in Nong Sung District.

==== Two additional groups ====
- Thai Vietnamese: Vietnamese people began migrating to Mukdahan in several waves, significant ones occurring during the Indochina and Vietnam Wars, crossing the Mekong to escape conflict. They are known for their diligence, thrift, and trading skills. Their most visible influence is in the food culture, which has become popular local cuisine, including Vietnamese noodle soup (pho), pork sausage, nem nuong (grilled pork rolls), Vietnamese hotpot, and traditional coffee. They are concentrated in Mukdahan Town Municipality, especially near the Mekong riverfront and the Indochina Market area.
- Thai Chinese: Chinese people arrived by junk boat and overland since the early Rattanakosin period and before World War II, mostly Teochew, Hainanese, and Hakka. They introduced modern commerce and trading systems to Mukdahan, playing a crucial role in driving the local economy through grocery stores, rice mills, and cross-border wholesale trade. They also introduced traditions and beliefs, such as Chinese New Year, the Ghost Festival, shrines, and charitable foundations. They form a major population in the commercial areas of Mueang Mukdahan.

==== Multicultural society and religion ====
Geopolitical context and cross-border cultural capital: Mukdahan is a frontier city with exceptional geographical significance. Despite being landlocked, its strategic location—approximately 150–200 kilometers through Savannakhet province, Laos, to the Vietnamese coast (near Hue) via Route 9—makes it not just an economic gateway but a "bridge for cultural capital," receiving migration, trade, and intermarriage across institutions since ancient times.

Mukdahan is notable for its multicultural coexistence, blending the lives of several groups—eight indigenous Thai groups, newer migrant communities, and people of all social classes—unified through religion, belief, and kinship systems:

- Theravada Buddhism: The majority religion and spiritual center. The social structure is bound by the "merit" system and local traditions, with Wat Si Mongkol Tai, a royal temple, enshrining "Phra Chao Ong Luang," a sacred Buddha image that has accompanied the city's history, reflecting the historical use of Buddhist authority in city governance.
- Mahayana Buddhism and Confucianism: Established by Thai Chinese and Thai Vietnamese communities engaged in trade. They built shrines, Chinese temples, and Vietnamese temples, using these as both spiritual anchors and social networks for commercial mutual support and preserving traditional architecture, rituals, and customs.
- Roman Catholicism: Introduced by French missionaries and doctors such as Xavier Guego, who used modern medicine to treat cholera, leading many to convert. The significant site is the Shrine of the Mother of the Martyrs of Songkhon, commemorating a tragedy of faith and reflecting the strength of Christianity in the Mekong border area.
- Islam: More recently, with the growth of the border economy, Muslims have migrated for business and settlement, forming a growing Muslim community that further enriches the province's cultural diversity.

Linguistic and contemporary cultural dynamics: Beyond traditional religious and ethnic diversity, Mukdahan's border city context has led several educational institutions to incorporate neighboring languages such as Lao and Vietnamese into their curricula. Furthermore, the influx of foreigners and globalized culture has brought new dynamics.

However, despite efforts to promote linguistic diversity and embrace new multicultural influences, these initiatives face significant challenges due to a lack of sustained support, combined with the broader context of limited administrative decentralization and infrastructure development from the government. As a result, Mukdahan's cultural and educational potential has yet to fully shine.

==== Language ====
The majority of Mukdahan's population uses Isan language (Ubon–Mukdahan accent) and central Lao, Savannakhet dialect as the primary daily communication languages. Central Thai is used in government and education. Additionally, ethnic languages still used in communities include:

- Phu Thai – in Phu Thai villages, Nong Sung, Khamcha-i, and Dong Luang.
- Kaso, Kaleng, Kha (Bru) – in Dong Luang, Don Tan, and Nikhom Kham Soi.
- Vietnamese – in Thai Vietnamese communities, Mukdahan Town Municipality.
- Teochew/Hakka Chinese – in Chinese communities in the town area.

==== Religion ====
The majority of Mukdahan's population practices Theravada Buddhism (96.80%), followed by Christianity (Roman Catholic in Wan Yai and Mueang districts, with some Protestants) at 3%, Islam, and some followers of Vietnamese traditional beliefs, Chinese beliefs, and indigenous belief systems.

==== Human Achievement Index (2022) ====
Health	Education	Employment	Income
41	60	41	74
Housing	Family	Transport	Participation
9	56	37	26
Mukdahan province has a Human Achievement Index (HAI) value of 0.6276, classified as "somewhat low," ranked 59th.

Since 2003, the United Nations Development Programme (UNDP) in Thailand has monitored human development at the regional level using the Human achievement index (HAI), a composite index covering eight key dimensions of human development. The National Economic and Social Development Board (NESDB) has taken over this task since 2017.

Rank	Development level
1–13	"High"
14–29	"Somewhat high"
30–45	"Average"
46–61	"Somewhat low"
62–77	"Low"

Map showing provinces and their HAI rankings (2022)

== Economy ==
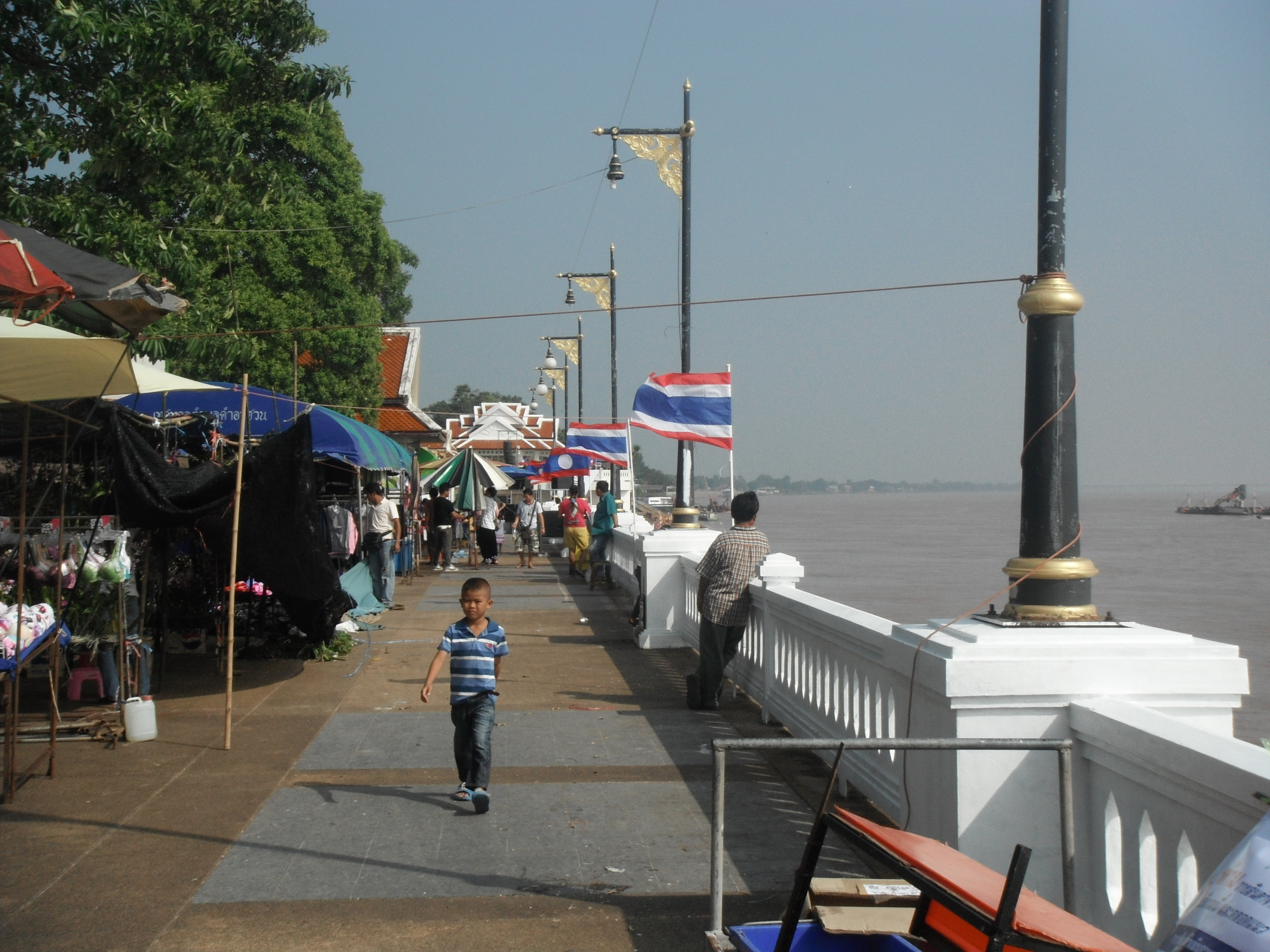
Indochina Market, a key border trade area along the Mekong River

Mukdahan's economic structure is driven by three main pillars: border trade, agriculture, and tourism. As a key frontier city on the East–West Economic Corridor (EWEC) connecting Thailand, Lao PDR, and Vietnam, it has high logistics and transport potential, being the shortest route to neighboring countries. This makes Mukdahan a significant transit city, generating revenue for the service sector, accommodation, and restaurants.

Per capita GPP is moderate for the northeastern region but shows consistent growth due to cross-border trade expansion, infrastructure development, and government investment policies.

=== Border trade and Special Economic Zone ===
Mukdahan is one of 10 provinces designated as a Special Economic Zone (MUKDAHAN SEZ) in the first phase, covering three districts: Mueang Mukdahan, Wan Yai, and Don Tan.

The main transport and border trade center is the Second Thai–Lao Friendship Bridge (Mukdahan–Savannakhet), the primary channel for exporting and importing goods to Lao PDR and central Vietnam. Key exports include consumer goods, fuel, electronic components, and vehicles. Annual border trade value reaches tens of billions of baht. Additionally, the Indochina Market along the Mekong River is a significant retail and wholesale center for goods from neighboring countries and China, generating substantial grassroots-level economic circulation.

==== Customs ====
As a key gateway on the EWEC, Mukdahan requires an efficient customs system to facilitate trade while ensuring regulatory compliance. The Mukdahan Customs Post is the main agency responsible, located at the Second Thai–Lao Friendship Bridge, Bang Sai Yai Subdistrict, Mueang Mukdahan District, under the Regional Customs Office 2, Customs Department, Ministry of Finance.

The Mukdahan Customs Post covers three provinces: Mukdahan, Kalasin, and Maha Sarakham, with two permanent border checkpoints under its supervision: the Mukdahan Border Checkpoint at the Second Thai–Lao Friendship Bridge (the main checkpoint for goods and passenger transport) and the Municipal Pier Border Checkpoint at the municipal pier building, Soi Song Nang Sathit, Mueang Subdistrict. Its missions include controlling imports and exports, collecting duties and taxes, facilitating trade, and preventing illegal goods smuggling, especially in the context of the Mukdahan SEZ, where customs supports smooth investment and border trade under the legal framework.

To accommodate growing trade volumes, the Mukdahan Customs Post has implemented electronic customs procedures (e-Customs) for online documentation and payment, reducing time and costs, and also offers ICD (Inland Container Depot) services for overland imports. The border trade value through this checkpoint continues to grow, reaching 43,471.787 million baht in May 2025. Key exports include consumer goods, fuel, and electronic components; key imports include agricultural products and minerals.

Beyond facilitation, the Mukdahan Customs Post also plays a role in suppressing illegal goods. For example, in March 2026, officers seized over 60,000 counterfeit items worth approximately 40 million baht, including bags, clothing, hats, and perfumes that were imported without documentation and infringed trademarks. The development of Mukdahan Customs Post's capacity is part of the SEZ strategy, with installations of advanced x-ray inspection systems, alongside projects such as Mukdahan Airport and the Ban Phai–Mukdahan–Nakhon Phanom dual-track railway, which will further enhance its role as a key regional trade gateway along the EWEC.

===== Mukdahan Customs Post import–export statistics =====
The following data represents border trade statistics at the Mukdahan Customs Post for the 2026 fiscal year (October 2025 – May 2026), sourced from the International Trade Statistics System (IMTS) and the Customs Information System (CIS).

====== Overall trade value ======
Import–Export Value at Mukdahan Customs Post (October 2025 – May 2026)
Month	Imports (million baht)	Exports (million baht)	Total (million baht)	Year-over-year change
October 2025	24,311.34	16,458.04	40,769.39	+43.75%
November 2025	30,814.44	15,095.81	45,910.24	+17.90%
December 2025	32,280.40	14,870.72	47,151.12	+36.24%
January 2026	24,817.18	17,358.36	42,175.54	+54.69%
February 2026	23,562.32	14,373.11	37,935.44	+19.48%
March 2026	31,881.61	22,252.35	54,133.96	+51.03%
April 2026	34,529.58	20,058.87	54,588.46	+66.99%
May 2026	30,888.87	22,359.44	53,248.32	+23.07%
Total 8 months	233,085.74	142,826.73	375,912.47	+37.04%

===== Top 10 imports (May 2026) =====
Top 10 Imports at Mukdahan Customs Post – May 2026
Rank	HS Code	Product description	Value (million baht)	Year-over-year change
1	8471	Automatic data processing machines and units	4,761.068	+65%
2	8517	Telephones, including smartphones	4,273.713	+27%
3	8473	Parts and accessories for machines	3,598.961	+98%
4	8523	Recording media, tapes, smart cards	2,698.626	+13%
5	8534	Printed circuits	1,690.545	+10%
6	2716	Electrical energy	935.947	+2%
7	8507	Batteries	792.552	+67%
8	7326	Other articles of iron or steel	764.172	+220%
9	3926	Other articles of plastics	638.910	+11%
10	8544	Insulated wire and cable	543.831	+73%

===== Top 10 exports (May 2026) =====
Top 10 Exports at Mukdahan Customs Post – May 2026
Rank	HS Code	Product description	Value (million baht)	Year-over-year change
1	8471	Automatic data processing machines and units	12,204.955	–1%
2	0810	Durian	1,177.549	+43,811%
3	8534	Printed circuits	1,080.359	+1,011%
4	8473	Parts and accessories for machines	981.098	+22%
5	8517	Telephones, including smartphones	911.542	+1,010%
6	0102	Live bovine animals	749.782	+16,283%
7	2710	Petroleum and bituminous mineral oils	564.487	+25%
8	8537	Panels, consoles, cabinets for electrical control	539.344	+295%
9	8504	Electrical transformers, converters	362.349	+134%
10	2202	Water, including mineral and carbonated waters	264.093	–5%

==== Agriculture and industry ====
Although not a large province, agriculture remains a primary income source. Key cash crops include rubber (high-quality areas), cassava and sugarcane (grown in upland and lowland areas for processing), and rice (jasmine and glutinous rice for domestic consumption and sale).

Most industries are agro-industries adding value to local products, such as sugar mills, rubber processing plants (smoked sheets and concentrated latex), tapioca starch factories, and biomass power plants. Logistics and warehousing are also growing alongside border trade expansion. Planned infrastructure like Mukdahan Airport and the Ban Phai–Mukdahan–Nakhon Phanom dual-track railway will attract investment and enhance future economic potential.

==== Tourism ====
Mukdahan is a secondary tourist city distinguished by its arts, culture of eight ethnic groups, and faith-based tourism along the Mekong. Key attractions blend culture, religion, and nature, particularly faith-based tourism related to Naga beliefs, such as Wat Phra Phutthabat Phu Manrom (housing Phaya Sri Mukda Maha Muni Nilpalanak) and Phaya Sri Phuchong Mukdanak, attracting both Thai and international tourists, generating significant revenue for hotels, restaurants, and local souvenirs.

In terms of development, Mukdahan shares similarities with Nakhon Phanom and Sakon Nakhon (the "SNUK" group), promoting tourism as "twin cities" to spread tourist distribution. However, the tourism sector faces challenges in post-COVID-19 recovery and the need for new landmarks or upgrading existing commercial attractions like Ho Kaeo Mukdahan Tower to increase appeal and competitiveness alongside telecommunications infrastructure readiness.

==== Sports ====
The main stadium is the Mukdahan Province Stadium (capacity approximately 5,000) and the Mukdahan Town Municipality Stadium. Professional football clubs include:

- Mukdahan Chaiyuenyong F.C. (Thai League 4, Northeastern Zone)
- Mukdahan City F.C.
- Don Tan PCCM F.C.

Mukdahan has hosted the National Games Region 4 (2017) and regularly hosts youth football tournaments.

===== Energy and Smart City =====
Mukdahan has been designated as one of the Smart City promotion areas, with a focus on Smart Energy through environmentally friendly renewable energy projects:

==== Wind energy ====
Mukdahan has high wind energy potential, with targeted wind power plants totaling 394.29 MW. Key projects include:

- Romklao Wind Farm: Located in Rom Klao Subdistrict, Nikhom Kham Soi District, operated by Winchai Co., Ltd., with 45 MW capacity. Its turbine towers reach 162 meters—among the tallest in Asia-Pacific—and have become a significant tourist landmark.
- Bo Thong Wind Farm 1 and 2: Located in Nikhom Kham Soi District, operated by Bo Thong Wind Farm Co., Ltd. (a subsidiary of B. Grimm Power), with 16 MW total capacity. Currently operating commercially (COD) and supplying power to the Provincial Electricity Authority.
- Expansion areas: Covering Kham Pa Lai and Dong Yen Subdistricts in Mueang Mukdahan District and parts of Nikhom Kham Soi, currently under private sector survey study for additional wind power development, alongside smart grid development.

==== Biomass and municipal waste energy ====
- Mukdahan Town Municipality Waste-to-Energy Plant: An environmentally friendly closed-system municipal waste management project generating electricity with 9.9 MW capacity, operated by TPI Polene Power Public Company Limited (TPIPP). This project will help Mukdahan achieve its goal of becoming a full-fledged clean energy Smart City.

==== Economic size and per capita income ====
Based on the economic overview of Mukdahan province, the Gross Provincial Product (GPP) in 2023 totaled 31,189 million baht, up from 29,555 million baht in 2022 (an increase of 1,634 million baht), with an economic growth rate of 3.18%. Per capita GPP in 2023 was 72,251 baht per person per year, an increase of 4.34% from 69,249 baht in 2022.

Demographic data from civil registration as of January 2025 shows Mukdahan province has 350,510 residents and 125,052 households.

Mukdahan Economic Statistics Summary (2022–2023)
Indicator	Statistical data (fiscal year)		Change (%)
Indicator	2022	2023	Change (%)
Gross Provincial Product (GPP)	29,555 million baht	31,189 million baht	▲3.18%
Per capita income	69,249 baht/person	72,251 baht/person	▲4.34%

Population and household data (as of January 2025)
Indicator	Number
Total population	350,510 persons
Number of households	125,052 households

== International relations ==
=== Sister cities of Mukdahan Province ===
Mukdahan province has established sister city relationships with cities in the Greater Mekong Subregion and Asia to promote economic, trade, tourism, and cultural cooperation:

- (Laos) Savannakhet province, Lao PDR – Signed March 21, 2004. The closest sister city due to shared borders, connected by the Second Thai–Lao Friendship Bridge, with long-standing kinship and cultural ties.
- Quang Tri province, Vietnam – Signed January 25, 2005. To promote trade, transport, and investment cooperation along the EWEC.
- Chongzuo, Guangxi Zhuang Autonomous Region, China – Signed July 6, 2011. To expand regional economic cooperation and cross-border goods transport to southern China.

Country	City/Province	Type	Signing date	Main purpose
Laos	Savannakhet province	Sister city	March 21, 2004	Border relations, culture, and cross-river transport
Vietnam	Quang Tri province	Sister city	January 25, 2005	Trade and transport along the EWEC
China	Chongzuo	Sister city	July 6, 2011	Regional economic and logistics cooperation

=== Future development directions ===
Currently, Mukdahan faces limitations in single-mode transportation (relying only on roads) and delays in developing the border SEZ. However, if infrastructure projects are successfully developed according to the strategic plan, significant changes will occur:

==== Multimodal Transport Hub ====
- The Ban Phai–Mukdahan–Nakhon Phanom dual-track railway, combined with a "Dry Port" establishment, will transform Mukdahan into a regional goods distribution center, directly connecting rail to Da Nang port, Vietnam, and southern China.

==== SEZ and MR-Map network ====
- Integrating the intercity highway network with rail will attract green industry investment and cross-border technology.

==== Self-reliant agricultural innovation ====
- Promoting Smart Farming to replace traditional agricultural labor and applying modern marketing technology to support an aging society will raise incomes and sustainably strengthen the grassroots economy.

== Education ==
=== Public vocational colleges ===
- Navamindrachini Mukdahan Technical College
- Nikhom Kham Soi Vocational College
- Don Tan Institute of Technology and Management
- Khamcha-i Vocational College

=== Private vocational colleges ===
- Dong Luang Commercial Technology College
- Rak Thai Mukdahan Business Administration Technology College
- Mukdahan Technology College

=== Public higher education institutions ===
- Mukdahan Community College
- Rajamangala University of Technology Thanyaburi (Academic Administration Office, Job Creation and Career Building Center, Mukdahan – preparing for the establishment of Mukdahan International University)

=== Higher education under the Office of Vocational Education Commission ===
- Northeastern Region 2 Vocational Education Institute, Navamindrachini Mukdahan Vocational College

=== Former higher education institutions ===
- Ubon Ratchathani University Mukdahan Campus: An educational expansion project that was once developed to completion, officially established by university council resolution with construction planned at Phu Pha Chie, Mueang Mukdahan. Princess Maha Chakri Sirindhorn graciously presided over the cornerstone-laying ceremony. However, the university council later resolved to cancel the project due to budget constraints and lower-than-expected student enrollment, combined with university policy focusing on consolidation at the main campus (Warin Chamrap District, Ubon Ratchathani).

=== Future higher education institutions ===
- Mukdahan International University (future university)

=== Healthcare facilities ===
Mukdahan has a total of 9 hospitals: 7 under the Provincial Public Health Office and 2 private hospitals. Details are shown in the following tables:

==== Under the Office of the Permanent Secretary for Public Health ====
Hospitals under the Office of the Permanent Secretary for Public Health, Mukdahan province (as of 2025)
Hospital name	Capability (care level)	Standard level (A/S/M/F)	Number of beds	Notes
Mukdahan Hospital	Tertiary Care	A+ (Large special provincial hospital)	485	Provincial general hospital
Nikhom Kham Soi Hospital	Secondary Care	F3 (Large community hospital)	60	
Khamcha-i Hospital	Secondary Care	F2 (Medium community hospital)	30	
Don Tan Hospital	Secondary Care	F2 (Medium community hospital)	30	
Dong Luang Hospital	Secondary Care	F2 (Medium community hospital)	30	
Wan Yai Hospital	Secondary Care	F2 (Medium community hospital)	30	
Nong Sung Hospital	Secondary Care	F2 (Medium community hospital)	30	

==== Private sector ====
Private hospitals in Mukdahan province (as of 2025)
Hospital name	Operator	Capability (care level)	Standard level (A/S/M/F)	Number of beds	Notes
Prince Mukdahan Hospital	Private (Principal Healthcare Co., Ltd.)	Secondary Care	— (Note: Private hospitals are not graded under the Ministry of Public Health's A/S/M/F standards)	30	Certified GREEN & CLEAN Hospital, excellent level
Mukdahan International Hospital	Private	Secondary Care	—	30	

==== Other affiliation types ====
Types of healthcare facilities not currently present in Mukdahan province (as of 2025)
Affiliation / Hospital type	Status in province	Notes
University / Medical center hospitals	None	No university-affiliated hospitals
Military / Police hospitals	None	No military or police hospitals
Local government hospitals	None	No local government hospitals (78 subdistrict health promotion hospitals exist)
Other affiliations (state enterprises, public organizations, etc.)	None	No other affiliation hospitals

=== Hospital capacity development in Mukdahan province ===
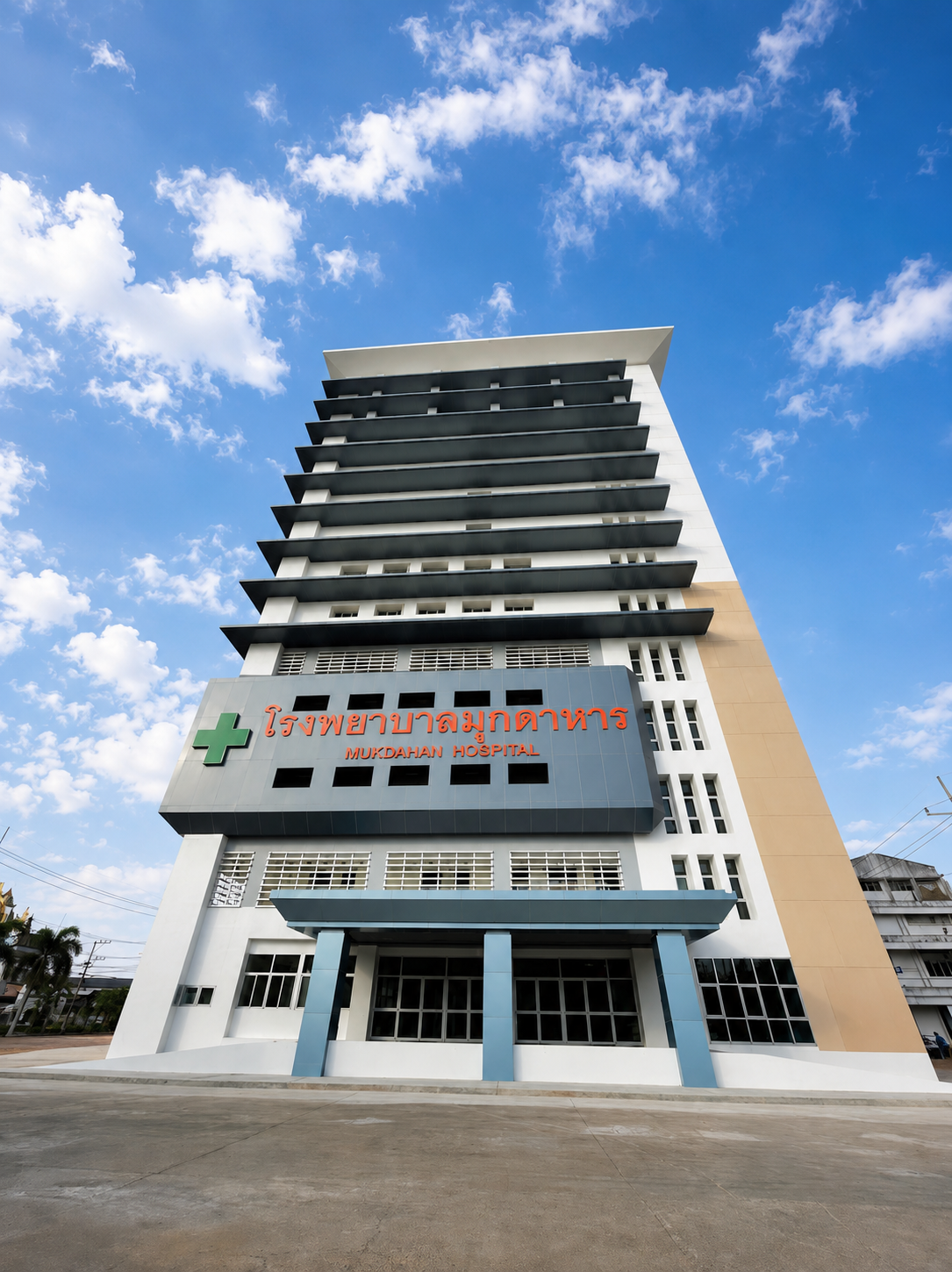
Mukdahan Hospital

Mukdahan is developing services under the "One Province One Hospital" strategy to share resources across the province and reduce congestion. Key projects include:

- Establishment of the Cardiac and Vascular Center (Cath Lab) at Mukdahan Hospital to reduce patient referrals and increase survival rates, opening for cardiac catheterization services on November 20, 2025.
- Elevating to Smart Hospital status: all hospitals in the province have passed the Diamond-level assessment, using online appointment systems, electronic medical records (vEMR), and telemedicine.
- Border health system connectivity: a vision to develop efficient service systems and connect border health networks for comprehensive coverage.

==== Personnel and public health statistics ====
- Key healthcare personnel per population in Mukdahan province:

Healthcare personnel and statistics (as of 2025)
Type	Number	Ratio (population per 1 personnel)
Key healthcare personnel
Physicians	110	3,151:1
Dentists	37	9,369:1
Pharmacists	68	5,098:1
Professional nurses	653	531:1
Public health academics	121	—
Number of beds
Total	710 beds	—
General hospital	485 beds	—
Community hospitals	225 beds	—

== Transportation ==
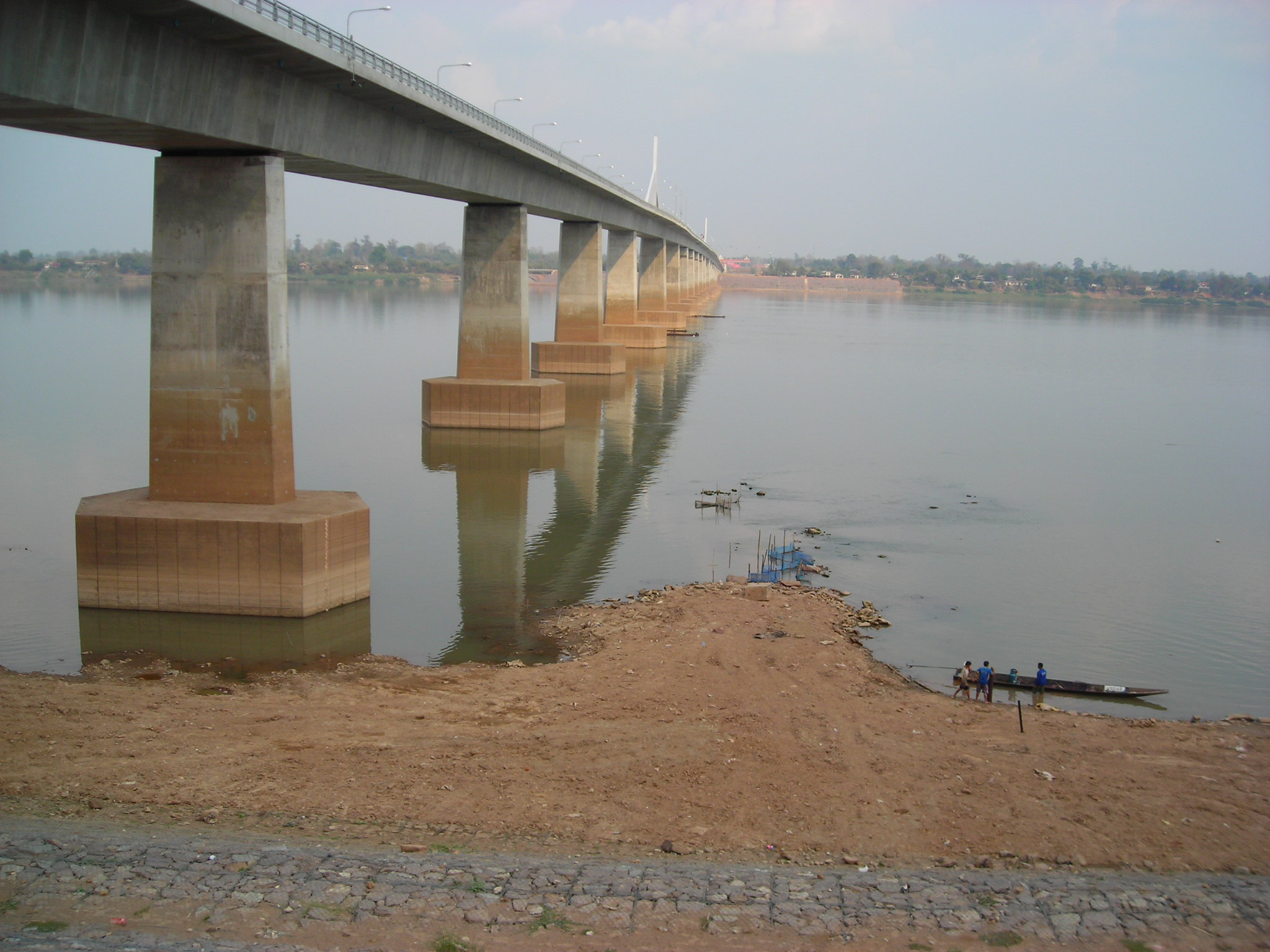
Second Thai–Lao Friendship Bridge (Mukdahan–Savannakhet), a key international transport connection

=== Highways ===
Mukdahan is an important transport center in the Indochina region, with main and secondary highways connecting travel within the province, between provinces, and internationally:

==== Main highways ====
- Highway 12 (Mae Sot–Mukdahan Road): The main transport route along the EWEC, passing through the province, starting from the Mae Sot border crossing, Tak Province, through the north and northeast, ending at the Second Thai–Lao Friendship Bridge permanent checkpoint, connecting to Lao PDR, Vietnam, and China.
- Highway 212 (Chayangkun Road): A north-south route passing through the center of Mukdahan Town Municipality and key districts, connecting from Nong Khai province through Bueng Kan, Nakhon Phanom, to Mukdahan, ending at Ubon Ratchathani. This route connects to four Thai–Lao Friendship Bridges: 1st (Nong Khai), 2nd (Mukdahan), 3rd (Nakhon Phanom), and 5th (Bueng Kan).

===== Other highways and connecting routes =====
- Highway 238 (Mukdahan Bypass Road): A ring road around the city, relieving traffic and heavy goods transport from entering the city center.
- Highway 239 (Second Friendship Bridge Access Road): A short route branching from the main highway to the border checkpoint and bridge.
- Highway 2034 (Mukdahan–Khemarat Road): A Mekong riverside route from Mueang Mukdahan through Don Tan to Amnat Charoen and Ubon Ratchathani, ending at Khemarat District.

===== Travel =====
====== By car ======
Mukdahan is approximately 652 kilometers from Bangkok, accessible by private car via two main routes:

- Route 1 (via Kalasin): From Bangkok, take Highway 1 (Phahonyothin Road), then Highway 2 (Mittraphap Road) through Saraburi and Nakhon Ratchasima, turn right onto Highway 23 at Ban Phai, through Maha Sarakham, turn left onto Highway 213 to Kalasin, then Highway 12 through Khamcha-i to Mukdahan.
- Route 2 (via Loeng Nok Tha): From Bangkok, take Highways 1 and 2 to Nakhon Ratchasima, then Highway 207 through Prathai and Phutthaisong, to Highway 202 through Phayakkhaphum Phisai, Kaset Wisai, Suwannaphum, then Highway 2169 through Sai Mun, Kut Chum, Loeng Nok Tha, turn left onto Highway 212 (Chayangkun Road) through Nikhom Kham Soi to Mukdahan.

====== General information ======
Mukdahan Bus Terminal is located at 33/12 Chayangkun Road, Mukdahan Subdistrict, Mueang Mukdahan District, Mukdahan 49000, serving ordinary and air-conditioned buses from private operators. Important routes include:

- Bangkok–Mukdahan
- Nakhon Ratchasima–Mukdahan
- Khon Kaen–Mukdahan
- Mukdahan–Rayong
- Mukdahan–Pattaya–Rayong
- Mukdahan–Hua Hin
- Mukdahan–Mae Sot

Travel by bus from Bangkok to Mukdahan takes approximately 11 hours, covering about 650 kilometers, with nighttime departures (6:00 PM–8:30 PM). Major operators include Transport Co., Ltd. (Route 999), Nakhonchai Air, and Thai Songwaen Tour. Estimated fares range from 457 to 560 baht.

====== By air ======
Mukdahan has no commercial airport within the province. Air travel relies on nearby airports:

- Nakhon Phanom Airport – approximately 120 kilometers (about 1 hour 50 minutes by road) — the most popular option, with vans and buses connecting to Mukdahan Bus Terminal.
- Ubon Ratchathani International Airport – approximately 170 kilometers (about 2 hours 30 minutes)
- Roi Et Airport – approximately 138 kilometers (about 1 hour 55 minutes)
- Savannakhet International Airport (Lao PDR) – approximately 20 kilometers, but limited by border crossing requirements. The government plans to utilize this airport as an interim option during the early phase of the Mukdahan Airport development plan.

In 2018, the Airports Department, Ministry of Transport, conducted a feasibility study for constructing an airport in Mukdahan with a budget of 6 million baht. The study was completed in March 2019 and is proceeding to the next phase, estimated to require over 5 billion baht for construction. If completed, it would become Thailand's 30th airport. The project is currently in the Environmental Impact Assessment (EIA) phase. Despite facing various issues, the project continues and has not been cancelled. The Cabinet has resolved to expedite the project to align with infrastructure development plans, particularly the Ban Phai–Nakhon Phanom railway project expected to be completed around the same time. Preliminary studies suggest economic viability but not financial viability. In 2020, detailed design and EIA preparation were commissioned. The original plan was to construct and open in 2026; this has been revised to commence construction in 2028 and open in 2031.

====== By train ======
Mukdahan currently has no rail system, but the Ban Phai–Mukdahan–Nakhon Phanom dual-track railway is under construction, originally expected to be completed in 2027. However, land expropriation issues have delayed the timeline, and the State Railway of Thailand has extended the contract and revised the schedule, with construction now expected to begin in July 2026, taking 36 months (3 years), with completion scheduled for 2029.

====== Within-province transport ======
- Songthaew (pickup trucks with benches): various routes, fares based on distance
- Tuk-tuks (motorized tricycles): mostly hired, fares based on distance
- Taxis: metered

====== Distances from Mukdahan town to districts ======
- Nikhom Kham Soi District – 29 km
- Wan Yai District – 32 km
- Don Tan District – 34 km
- Khamcha-i District – 38 km
- Nong Sung District – 53 km
- Dong Luang District – 55 km

===== Border crossings to Laos =====
1. Permanent checkpoint at the Second Thai–Lao Friendship Bridge (Mueang Mukdahan – Kaysone Phomvihane, Savannakhet province) 2. Permanent checkpoint at the Municipal Pier (Mueang Mukdahan – Kaysone Phomvihane, Savannakhet province)

== Important sites and tourist attractions ==
=== Royal temples and important monasteries ===
- Wat Si Mongkol Tai (Royal temple)
- Wat Si Sumang Wanaram
- Wat Si Mongkol Nuea
- Wat Pa Silawivek (Institute of Mental Power, Branch 105)
- Wat Manophirom (built around 1753, Vientiane-style architecture)
- Wat Phra Si Maha Pho
- Wat Phra Phutthabat Phu Manrom
- Wat Yot Kaeo Siwichai
- Wat Dan Phra In
- Wat Pa Wiwet Wataram (Luang Pu Cham's temple)
- Wat Si Bunrueang (Khamcha-i District)
- Wat Si Bunrueang (Nong Khaen Subdistrict)
- Wat Si Bunrueang (Chanot Noi Subdistrict)
- Wat Woen Chai Mongkhon
- Wat Phu Lom Khum

==== Sacred sites, shrines, monuments, and memorials ====
- Phra Chao Ong Luang (ancient Buddha image, Vientiane Lan Xang art, the city's sacred image)
- Phra Phuttha Ming Mongkhon Maha Muni Sri Mukdahan (Great Buddha, Mukdahan Gem Sri Trairattana)
- Phra Phuttha Nawam Ming Mongkhon Maha Muni Sri Mukdahan (enshrined at the top of Ho Kaeo Mukdahan Tower)
- Phaya Sri Mukda Maha Muni Nilpalanak
- Mukdahan City Pillar Shrine
- Chao Pho Chao Fa Mueang Mueang Shrine
- Chao Mae Song Nang Phiang Nong Shrine (Prasat Song Nang Sathit)
- Chao Pu Uppahat Ratchawong Shrine, Bang Sai Yai Subdistrict Municipality
- King Chulalongkorn and King Vajiravudh Monument (in front of Mukdahan Provincial Hall)
- Phraya Chanthasrisurach Uparaja Manthaturaj Monument (beside the 250th Anniversary Hall)
- Sergeant To Memorial and Honor Hall (Major General Thawatchai Busapha) – soldier who died in the Thai–Cambodian border conflict
- Phaya Anontanak (Naga image)
- Four-clan Naga Clock Tower Memorial
- Shrine of the Mother of the Martyrs (Songkhon Catholic Church)
- Nhouhak Phoumsavanh Museum (Thai–Lao historical memorial)
- Phrai Krot Ratcha Monument, Nong Sung District

==== National parks and nature conservation areas ====
- Phu Pha Thoep National Park (covering Mueang Mukdahan and Don Tan districts)
- Phu Sa Dok Bua National Park (covering Mukdahan, Yasothon, and Amnat Charoen)
- Phu Pha Yon National Park (covering Sakon Nakhon, Nakhon Phanom, and Mukdahan)
- Phu Si Than Wildlife Sanctuary (covering Mukdahan and Kalasin)
- Dong Bang I Forest Park (Na Kok Subdistrict, Nikhom Kham Soi District)
- Tham Pha Nam Thip Non-hunting Area (covering Roi Et, Kalasin, and Mukdahan)

==== Natural attractions and viewpoints ====
- Ho Kaeo Mukdahan Tower
- Kaeng Kabao (Phaya Sri Phuchong Mukdanak)
- Dong Bang I Arboretum
- Hat Manophirom
- Ko Kan Lueang
- Wang Thiam Mek
- Tat Don Waterfall
- Tham Sai Waterfall
- Pha Choen Waterfall
- Pha Kiu Viewpoint (within Dong Bang I Forest Park)
- Huai Khilek Irrigation Reservoir
- Rom Klao Wind Farm, Mukdahan

===== Commercial districts and community life =====
- Indochina Market (Walking Street and Indochina Pier)
- Night Market
- Mukdahan Walking Street
- Mukdahan Square
- Ban Phu Cultural Tourism Village
- Pha Thong Farm
- Chang Thong Farm and Cafe

===== Important structures and transport infrastructure =====
- Second Thai–Lao Friendship Bridge
- Second Thai–Lao Friendship Bridge Roundabout

===== Parks and stadiums =====
- Mukdahan Town Municipality Golden Jubilee Park (Na Bueng)
- Chao Pu Uppahat Ratchawong Shrine Golden Jubilee Park, Bang Sai Yai Subdistrict Municipality
- Mukdahan Province Stadium

===== Archaeological and historical sites =====
- Khai Samai Hin (Stone Age shell midden)
- Dong Son bronze drums
- Somdet Ya Park (Woraphon Base)
- Tham Pha Mueang Daeng (Huai Sing)

===== Fossil sites =====
- Nong Sung dinosaur footprint site – ancient freshwater shark fossils (cartilaginous fish) from the Paleozoic era, Mukdahannodus trisivakulii
- Phu Pha Thoep National Park dinosaur site
- Phu Hin Lek Fai vertebrate fossil site, within Phu Sa Dok Bua National Park – fish scales, crocodile teeth, and other Paleozoic fossils
- Dan Koeng vertebrate fossil site
- Dan Luang vertebrate fossil site
- Phu Tham Phra vertebrate fossil site, within Phu Pha Thoep National Park
- Ban Kham Phok fossil site, Kham Phok Subdistrict, Nong Sung District – large ancient land tortoise fossils Basilochelys macrobios (Tong et al., 2009), Late Jurassic to Early Cretaceous, and Coelacanth fish fossils from the Middle Devonian period of the Paleozoic era

==== Traditions and culture ====
===== Religious ceremonies and traditions =====
- Bun Khao Yaku – offering to the sacred relics
- City Pillar and sacred shrine worship ceremony
- Pre-boat race and water opening ceremony, and Ti Chang Nam Nong (elephant water ritual)
- Naga worship ceremony on the Mekong riverbank at the Friendship Bridge
- Songkhon Star Procession during Christmas at the Martyrs' Shrine
- Bun Bang Fai (Rocket Festival)
- Loy Krachu tradition (local Loy Krathong using coconut shells, at Mukdahan Pier)
- Phra That Phu Manrom worship and bathing ceremony
- Phra Chao Ong Luang bathing ceremony at Wat Si Mongkol Tai

===== Festivals =====
- Mukdahan Chinese–Vietnamese New Year Festival
- Songkran Festival
- Boat Race Festival (end of Buddhist Lent) and Ti Chang Nam Nong
- Mukdahan Product and Red Cross Fair
- Mukdahan Thai Tribes and Sweet Tamarind Festival
- On Son Khamcha-i Festival
- Mukdahan–Savannakhet Marathon
- Mukdahan Naga 3 Realms Festival

===== Local arts and culture =====
- Phu Thai Hom Ngao Festival, Nong Sung Phrai Krot Ratcha worship
- Bru Hai Thai So Festival (Dong Luang District)
- Lam Phaya (Don Tan District)
- So Thang Bang ritual
- Phu Thai (Phu Tai) dance
- Heya ceremony
- Ethnic weaving crafts

===== Local products and cuisine =====
- Mudmee silk with Mukdahan gem pattern (provincial identity fabric, woven by Ban Kham Ahuan and Ban Na Si Nuan weavers)
- Sweet tamarind (Khamcha-i District)
- Ancient bronze drum replicas (Production and conservation center, Nikhom Kham Soi District)
- Water hyacinth products (Dong Yen occupation group)

===== Food =====
====== Local and adapted dishes ======
- Tam Miang (herbal salad)
- Kaeng Ilok Songkhrueng (spiced soup)
- Phana Kae Mae Khong
- Salihakap
- Om Bon Ban Na
- Om Wai
- Kaeng Het Phao
- Nong Sung beef barbecue with Jaew
- Red ant grilled chicken
- Khao Tom Pad (fermented rice stir-fry)

==== Processed foods and Vietnamese-influenced cuisine ====
- Pla Som (fermented fish)
- Vietnamese pork sausage
- Nem Nuong (grilled pork rolls)
- Khao Piak Sen (Pho noodle soup)
- Traditional Vietnamese-style coffee

==== Notable people ====
===== Contributors to Mukdahan province, city rulers, and historical figures =====
- Phraya Chanthasrisurach Uparaja Manthaturaj (Chao Chanthakinnaree)
- Chao Chanthathep Suriyawong Damrong Rat Sema Mukdathibodi (Chao Nu)
- Phraya Sasiwong Prawat (Mek Chanthasakha)
- Chaloem Yot Saen Wiset – proposer of establishing Mukdahan province

===== National-level civil servants and leaders =====
- Field Marshal Sarit Thanarat – 11th Prime Minister of Thailand. Though not born in Mukdahan, he spent part of his childhood there, beginning his primary education at a Mukdahan school.
- Nhouhak Phoumsavanh – 4th President of Laos, born and raised in Mukdahan before participating in the Lao political transformation and rising to the presidency.
- Luang Phithak Phanom Khet (Sih Chanthasakha) – former chief of That Phanom District, son of Phraya Sasiwong Prawat.
- Major General Thawatchai Busapha (Sergeant To) – soldier who died in the Thai–Cambodian border conflict, from Ban Song, Khamcha-i District, Mukdahan.

===== Monks and revered teachers =====
- Phra Racha Mukdahan Khani (Yot Yashchato)
- Phra Racha Rattana Moli (Som Yong Gatapunyo) – Head of Mukdahan provincial monastic order, abbot of Wat Si Bunrueang
- Luang Pu Luan Chanthasaro (Phra Khru Chanthrawisutthi)
- Phra Thep Mongkhon Wachirarangsri (Surasak Chivanontho)

===== Politicians =====
- Wiriyat Thongpha – Member of Parliament, Mukdahan Constituency 1
- Lekhada Traisornkrom Nongrueang – Member of Parliament, Mukdahan Constituency 2
- Nakon Chareephan – former Member of Parliament, Mukdahan, 26th Parliament
- Bunthin Prathumli – former Member of Parliament, Mukdahan
- Withaya Butdeewong – former Member of Parliament, Mukdahan
- Anurak Tangpanithanont – former Member of Parliament, Mukdahan
- Warasuli Suwannaparisut – former Member of Parliament, Mukdahan, and former Mukdahan Town Municipality councilor

===== Artists, actors, and musicians =====
- Thansita Suwatcharathanakit (Chompu) – actress and host, born in Wan Yai District, Mukdahan
- Sarucha Phetcharot (Ying Ying) – actress, model, YouTuber, and race car driver, born in Mukdahan
- Monsit Khamsoi – country singer, born in Na Udom Subdistrict, Nikhom Kham Soi District, Mukdahan
- New Mukda (Watcharaboon Malasai) – famous mor lam singer, from Ban Kham Nang Ok, Nikhom Kham Soi District, Mukdahan
- Nuchariya Mukda (Piano) – singer, daughter of New Mukda
- I Din Apinan – singer, born in Mukdahan

===== Local scholars =====
- Chan Phanbut – textile weaving scholar, Ban Nong Kha, Nong Waeng Subdistrict, Nikhom Kham Soi District
- Thi Mikham – textile weaving scholar, Ban Pong Daeng, Nong Waeng Subdistrict, Nikhom Kham Soi District
- Nuan Si Yuanyong – textile weaving scholar, Ban Nong Kok Plueai, Nong Waeng Subdistrict, Nikhom Kham Soi District
- Ladda Karinthong – textile weaving scholar, Ban Non Sa-at, Nong Waeng Subdistrict, Nikhom Kham Soi District
- Phai Sakun Khamnon – local scholar, Na Kok Subdistrict, Nikhom Kham Soi District

===== Football players =====
- Players of Mukdahan Chaiyuenyong F.C. (currently in Thailand Amateur League)

====== Rowers ======
- Somchai Sae-sia – Thai national rowing team, Mukdahan Rowing Club

====== Equestrian ======
- Nithiphat Ngaosa – Thai national equestrian team, Dressage discipline

==== Current issues ====
- Government corruption – reflected in news coverage, local experiences, and Integrity and Transparency Assessment (ITA) results (2025, ranked 70th out of 76 provinces)
- Recurrent flooding – lowland areas along the Mekong and tributaries experience flooding almost every year, especially August–October
- Forest fires and haze – in reserved forests and Phu Pha Thoep National Park, regularly occurring February–April
- PM2.5 air pollution – in Mukdahan town and agricultural areas, exceeding standards during dry season
- Labor shortages – due to young workers migrating to other provinces or abroad

==== Security ====
Note: Data in this section reflects 2020–2023 statistics and current situations

Mukdahan is a border province with the Mekong River forming a 72-kilometer natural boundary with Lao PDR. This topography facilitates illegal smuggling of contraband and drugs, particularly methamphetamine (ya ba) and crystal meth (ya ice), which are the most commonly seized drugs in the area.

Drug smuggling and trafficking: Key smuggling routes still use natural channels along the Mekong in Mueang Mukdahan, Don Tan, and Wan Yai districts, using long-tail boats for night crossings or mixed with local fishing boats. Currently, drug networks have adapted by using social media for communication and delivery coordination, presenting significant challenges to security agencies.

Customs evasion and illegal goods: Beyond drugs, there is smuggling of agricultural products, counterfeit goods, and duty-evaded goods. Mukdahan Customs and the Mekong River Peacekeeping Units have integrated efforts to patrol and install CCTV along the border to enhance prevention and suppression.

Foreign labor: Most are Lao workers (1,081 out of 1,108, 97.56% as of December 2011), unskilled laborers working as general workers and domestic servants. There are also stateless children born in Thailand.

Human trafficking: Typically involves employers or former workers recruiting unemployed Lao people seeking opportunities, arranging transport, accommodation, and jobs. Some are covertly engaged in prostitution under the guise of traditional massage, restaurant servers, karaoke bars, or cafes.

==== Crime statistics ====
Note: Data in this section represents case files and types from 2021–2025 Statistical case volumes are shown below:

Case type	Description	2026	2025	2024	2023	2022	2021
S.1	Cases with suspects sent for prosecution		1,715	1,296	1,084	1,140	2,227
S.1 (Rehab)	Drug rehabilitation cases		0	0	1	138	2,437
S.2	Cases with suspects not sent		194	160	137	234	136
S.2 G	Cases with suspects not sent (fine comparison cases)		97	35	94	325	243
S.3	Cases with unidentified perpetrators		79	57	36	88	101
S.4 (District Court)	Oral criminal complaint cases		1,574	1,543	1,459	3,521	1,055
S.4	Criminal complaint cases		1,653	1,214	1,084	0	0
S.5 G	Civil cases		24	0	61	78	26
S.12	Autopsy investigation cases		0	4	0	4	1
S.12 G	Unnatural death cases		17	15	25	33	37
	Total		5,353	4,325	3,981	5,561	6,263

==== Natural resources and environment ====
===== Forests =====
Mukdahan has approximately 863,281 rai of forest area (31.83% of provincial area), comprising 13 national reserved forests, 3 national parks (Phu Pha Thoep, Phu Sa Dok Bua, Phu Pha Yon), and Phu Si Than Wildlife Sanctuary. The province's master plan target is to maintain forest area at no less than 33%.

===== Soil and land use =====
Most land is agricultural, approximately 885,606 rai (33% of provincial area), with mostly sandy loam soils of moderate to low fertility. Approximately 35% is upland and mountain areas with steep slopes unsuitable for cultivation.

===== Water resources =====
The most important water source is the Mekong River, flowing through 3 border districts (Mueang Mukdahan, Wan Yai, Don Tan). Important tributaries include Huai Muk, Huai Bang Sai, Huai Bang I, and Huai Chanot. Irrigation covers approximately 49,720 rai, with 21 reservoirs and 2 floodgates, total storage capacity 108.50 million cubic meters.

===== Solid waste =====
Waste management has developed significantly. In 2023, a municipal solid waste-to-energy project (Waste to Energy) was initiated by Mukdahan Town Municipality in partnership with the private sector, with 8-9.9 MW capacity, which will help solve waste accumulation and effectively manage waste from various local government organizations.

===== Water quality =====
Note: Water quality data from 2011 is still used due to lack of updates

Surface water monitoring of the Mekong River is classified as Category 3 (good to fair), but Huai Muk and Huai Khae, receiving wastewater from town municipality areas, have deteriorating water quality (Category 4–5) with DO below 4 mg/l, BOD exceeding 2 mg/l, and coliform bacteria exceeding 4,000 MPN/100 ml.

==== Public utilities ====
===== Electricity =====
The Provincial Electricity Authority Mukdahan has expanded electricity coverage to all villages. Statistics show 109,331 electricity users and 339.03 million kilowatt-hours of electricity consumption. Renewable energy promotion includes large-scale wind power plant projects in Nikhom Kham Soi District, positioning Mukdahan as a Smart Energy city.

===== Water supply =====
Water supply is provided by the Provincial Waterworks Authority, Mukdahan Branch, drawing raw water primarily from the Mekong River. There are currently 6 distribution areas with 18,667 users and 4,739,509 cubic meters annual supply, alongside upgrading village water supply systems for remote communities.

===== Communication and telecommunications =====
Note: Communication data from 2011 is still used due to lack of updates

There are 33 post offices: Mueang Mukdahan 19, Khamcha-i 1, Don Tan 1, Nikhom Kham Soi 1, Dong Luang 1, Wan Yai 1, Nong Sung 1. Postal codes: 49000 (Mueang), 49110 (Khamcha-i), 49120 (Don Tan), 49130 (Nikhom Kham Soi), 49140 (Dong Luang), 49150 (Wan Yai), 49160 (Nong Sung). Telephone: exchanges in every district with ADSL internet, total 14,772 numbers, 9,617 active, 5,248 ADSL ports, 3,843 active.
