= Ban Kok Kok =

Village in Mukdahan Province, Thailand

Coordinates: 16.864694°N 104.215888°E

Ban Kok Kok (Thai: บ้านกกกอก, pronounced [bâːn kòk kɔ̀ːk]) is a muban (village) in Kok Tum Sub-district, Dong Luang District, Mukdahan Province, Isan region (northeast Thailand).

== History ==
Originally, Ban Kok Kok and the adjacent Ban Kok Tum were part of Na Kae District, Nakhon Phanom Province, as Mukdahan Province had not yet been established at that time. Ban Kok Kok was one of about 30 villages scattered in the valley at the tri-border of Nakhon Phanom, Sakon Nakhon, and Kalasin. The main ethnic groups are the Phu Thai and the Bru.

The area is surrounded by the Phu Phan Mountain Range, which served as a stronghold of the Communist Party of Thailand (CPT) during the Cold War (1960s to early 1980s).

In 1965, the CPT sent its members to incite locals to adopt communism and join the movement against the government. From then on, Ban Kok Kok (including Ban Kok Tum) also fell under CPT influence and was considered a "red zone," especially between 1968 and 1982. Ban Kok Kok was also used as a campsite for government troops.

After 1982, the situation in the area improved when CPT members surrendered to the government. During this period, a road called "Prem Phatthana" (ถนนเปรมพัฒนา, [tʰa.nǒn prēːm pʰát.tʰa.nāː], named after Gen Prem Tinsulanonda, then Prime Minister) was built through the village to connect with Khao Wong District in Kalasin Province, which brought prosperity to the area.

In September 1982, Mukdahan Province was formally established as a secession from Nakhon Phanom. Dong Luang was later upgraded from a king amphoe (minor-district) to a full district on July 27, 1984, divided into six sub-districts and 60 villages.

== Geography ==
Ban Kok Kok is adjacent to Chan Phen Sub-district, Tao Ngoi District, Sakon Nakhon Province in north, where there are two villages on the mountains, Ban Kuan Boon and Ban Bueng Sa. The locals can therefore contact other communities on the plain by two routes, namely on the side of Na Kae District and Tao Ngoi District. Most of the geography is a plateau interspersed with sandstone hills.

Ban Kok Kok is 528 km (328.1 mi) north-east of Bangkok, and about 200 km (124.3 mi) north-west of Mukdahan town.

== Economy ==
Most of the population is engaged in rice farming and rubber plantation. Farming of bandicoot rat is another occupation that generates income for the community.

== Hot issue ==
Ban Kok Kok was originally a small, quiet, and remote village in a rural area, little known to outsiders. That changed on May 11, 2020, when a three-year-old local girl of Phu Tai descent, Orawan "Nong Chompoo" Wongsicha, mysteriously disappeared from her home. On May 14, just three days later, her unclothed body was discovered at dusk on Phu Lek Fai hill, part of Phu Pha Yon National Park, about 5 km (3.1 mi) from her house. Villagers insisted that a child so young could not have reached the location on her own.

Hundreds of police officers from Bangkok were dispatched to investigate, gather evidence, and question numerous witnesses and suspects. Media attention soon focused on one of the suspects, Chaiphol "Lung Phol" Wipha, the girl's uncle-in-law, who briefly became a celebrity figure. Many critics, however, condemned the way the case was transformed from a serious investigation into a form of popular entertainment.

As a result of the publicity, Ban Kok Kok began attracting curious visitors, even organized tours, which led to changes in the way of life for some villagers.
