= Boonpeng =

Executed Thai murderer and suspected serial killer

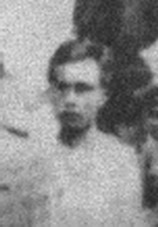
- Born: 1890; Tha Uthen district, Monthon Lao Phuan, Siam (now Nakhon Phanom province, Thailand)
- Died: 19 August 1919 (aged 28–29); Bangkok, Siam
- Cause of death: Execution by beheading
- Other name: "Boonpeng the Iron Chest"
- Conviction: Murder x2
- Penalty: Death

Details
- Victims: 2–7
- Span of crimes: 1917–1918
- Country: Thailand
- Date apprehended: 14 January 1918

Boonpeng (1890 – 19 August 1919), popularly known as Boonpeng Heep Lek (Thai: บุญเพ็งหีบเหล็ก, RTGS: Bunpheng Hip Lek) or Iron-Chest Boonpeng, was a Thai murderer and suspected serial killer who killed between two and seven religious worshippers in 1917. Convicted for these killings, he was beheaded in 1919. He is the last prisoner executed by beheading in the country.

== Early life ==
Boonpeng was born in 1890 to a Chinese father and a Lao mother in Tha Uthen, Monthon Lao Phuan (now Nakhon Phanom province). He was brought to Bangkok at age 5, where he lived in the Bang Khun Phrom district. Some sources claim that it was an elderly couple, Souk and Pian, who raised him as their grandson.

As a teenager, Boonpeng was considered a handsome, charming and eloquent character who easily swooned local women, but was also known for avoiding hard work and being very lazy. While his foster grandparents were working, he would spend his free time studying black magic, superstitions and making love potions. He began extensively studying the topic with the help of an old undertaker who lived a temple near his home, but after he mastered the art, his foster grandparents kicked him out, as they refused to allow someone practising evil magic to live with them. The now-20-year-old then moved to Bang Lamphu, in downtown Bangkok, where he was ordained as a bhikkhu at the Wat Thewarat Kunchorn, an ancient temple.

Using his charming personality and knowledge of black magic, Boonpeng would attract the attention of various upper-class citizens, mostly wealthy women, with whom he would sometimes have sex as part of his 'rituals'. As this was considered a grave sin, he was expelled by the temple's abbot. Boonpeng then moved to the Wat Suthat temple, where he managed to convince the abbot that he would change his sinful ways. Despite his promises, Boonpeng's behaviour worsened, as he not only continued having love affairs and practising black magic but also opened a gambling den on temple grounds, which he operated in secret.

== Murders, arrest and execution ==
It's unclear when exactly Boonpeng began killing, or how many victims he had. According to official accounts and his own claims, his first confirmed victim was a jewellery merchant named Nai Learm, who he killed following a dispute. After that, Boonpeng is said to have sealed his body in an iron chest and dumped it into the Khlong Bangkok Noi, which was found in May 1917. His other known victim was a wealthy 20-year-old woman named Prik, who had originally approached him to concoct a love potion to make her husband love her again, but then became his lover and was eventually impregnated by Boonpeng. As she wanted him to be a responsible father and look after their child, Boonpeng decided to kill her, as he had already arranged marriage for himself.

Boonpeng is said to have hit her and then wrapped her in a mosquito net, before stuffing her into an iron chest and dumping in the Chao Phraya River, which he had filled with bricks to weigh it down and drown her. It was discovered in early January 1918 by fishermen in Nonthaburi Province. Since they believed it might contain some treasures, as these chests were usually only used by wealthy people, the fishermen opened it but were shocked to find a woman's body inside. They notified the authorities, who frantically began searching for the killer, but to no avail. When news spread of the mysterious unidentified woman's death, the police were contacted by her mother, who claimed that her daughter, Prik, had gone to reclaim a gold necklace from a notorious monk named Boonpeng, who operated out of the Wat Suthat temple in Bangkok.

Acting on her tip-off, police began investigating Boonpeng, but were unable to arrest him immediately as they had no solid evidence against him. They appealed to the public for any information, prompting a rickshaw driver, Charan, to approach them, claiming that he had been hired by the monk to dump the iron chest into the river. After receiving this information, police finally swept in and arrested Boonpeng during his wedding ceremony on 14 January 1918. While in custody, he confessed to killing both Nai Learm and Prik, but it was also suggested that he was responsible for up to five other disappearances, mostly of alleged lovers, whom he also sealed in iron chests and then dumped them in canals.

He would be charged with his two known murders, convicted and swiftly sentenced to death. He was publicly beheaded on 19 August 1919 and buried at Wat Phasi temple, now in Watthana District.

In the decades that followed, locals built a shrine in the name of his spirit, in their belief that with the passage of time, his soul would be purified. Nowadays, he is affectionately referred to as "Uncle Boonpeng" and is revered as a friendly spirit which protects his worshippers from evil, and that his seven iron chests are buried under the temple.

== See also ==
- List of serial killers by country

== In the media ==
- In 1967, Boonpeng's story was retold in a radio drama that later got adapted into a film directed by Payung Payakul, with actor Man Theerapol in the main lead.
- In 1980, another film, this time starring Sombat Metanee and Prasan Chabaprai, was made based on the case.
- In 2006, a direct-to-DVD film was made based on this case, starring Prompong Nopparit, Thadtuang Maneechan and Morakot Manichai.
