= Phon Na Kaeo district =

Phon Na Kaeo โพนนาแก้ว
- District
- District location in Sakon Nakhon province
- Coordinates: 17°13′16″N 104°17′24″E
- Country: Thailand
- Province: Sakon Nakhon
- Seat: Na Kaeo

Area
  - Total: 352.0 km^{2} (135.9 sq mi)

Population (2005)
  - Total: 35,579
  - Density: 101.1/km^{2} (262/sq mi)
- Time zone: UTC+7 (ICT)
- Postal code: 47230
- Geocode: 4717

Phon Na Kaeo (Thai: โพนนาแก้ว, pronounced [pʰōːn nāː kɛ̂ːw]) is a district (amphoe) of Sakon Nakhon province, northeast Thailand.

== History ==
The minor district (king amphoe) was created on 1 April 1991, when the four tambons Ban Phon, Na Kaeo, Na Tong Watthana, and Ban Paen were split off from Mueang Sakon Nakhon district. It was upgraded to a full district on 5 December 1996.

== Geography ==
Neighboring districts are (from the south clockwise) Khok Si Suphan, Mueang Sakon Nakhon and Kusuman of Sakon Nakhon Province, Pla Pak, Huai Phueng and Wang Yang of Nakhon Phanom province.

== Administration ==
The district is divided into five sub-districts (tambons), which are further subdivided into 48 villages (mubans). There are no municipal (thesaban) areas, and a further five tambon administrative organizations.

No.	Name	Thai name	Villages	Pop.
1.	Ban Phon	บ้านโพน	8	6,378
2.	Na Kaeo	นาแก้ว	12	10,848
3.	Na Tong Watthana	นาตงวัฒนา	11	6,553
4.	Ban Paen	บ้านแป้น	10	6,957
5.	Chiang Sue	เชียงสือ	7	4,843
