= Na Khun Yai =

Coordinates: 17°30′41″N 104°8′11″E

Na Khun Yai นาคูณใหญ่
- Subdistrict
- Interactive map of Na Khun Yai
- Country: Thailand
- Province: Nakhon Phanom
- District: Na Wa

Area
  - Total: 17.734 km^{2} (6.847 sq mi)

Population (2005)
  - Total: 4,565
  - Density: 257.4/km^{2} (666.7/sq mi)
- Postal Code: 48180
- Geocode: 480904

Na Khun Yai (Thai: นาคูณใหญ่, pronounced [nāː kʰūːn jàj]) is a subdistrict (tambon) in Nakhon Phanom Province, administered by Na Wa District in northeastern Thailand (Isan).

The village is about 900 km north of Bangkok. Na Khun Yai is underdeveloped, with agriculture as the main economic activity.

== Geography ==
Neighboring subdistricts are Phon Suang (Si Songkhram District) to the north and east and Na Wa to the south and west.

== History ==
The subdistrict was created on 1 May 1978, when five villages were split off from Na Wa.

== Administration ==
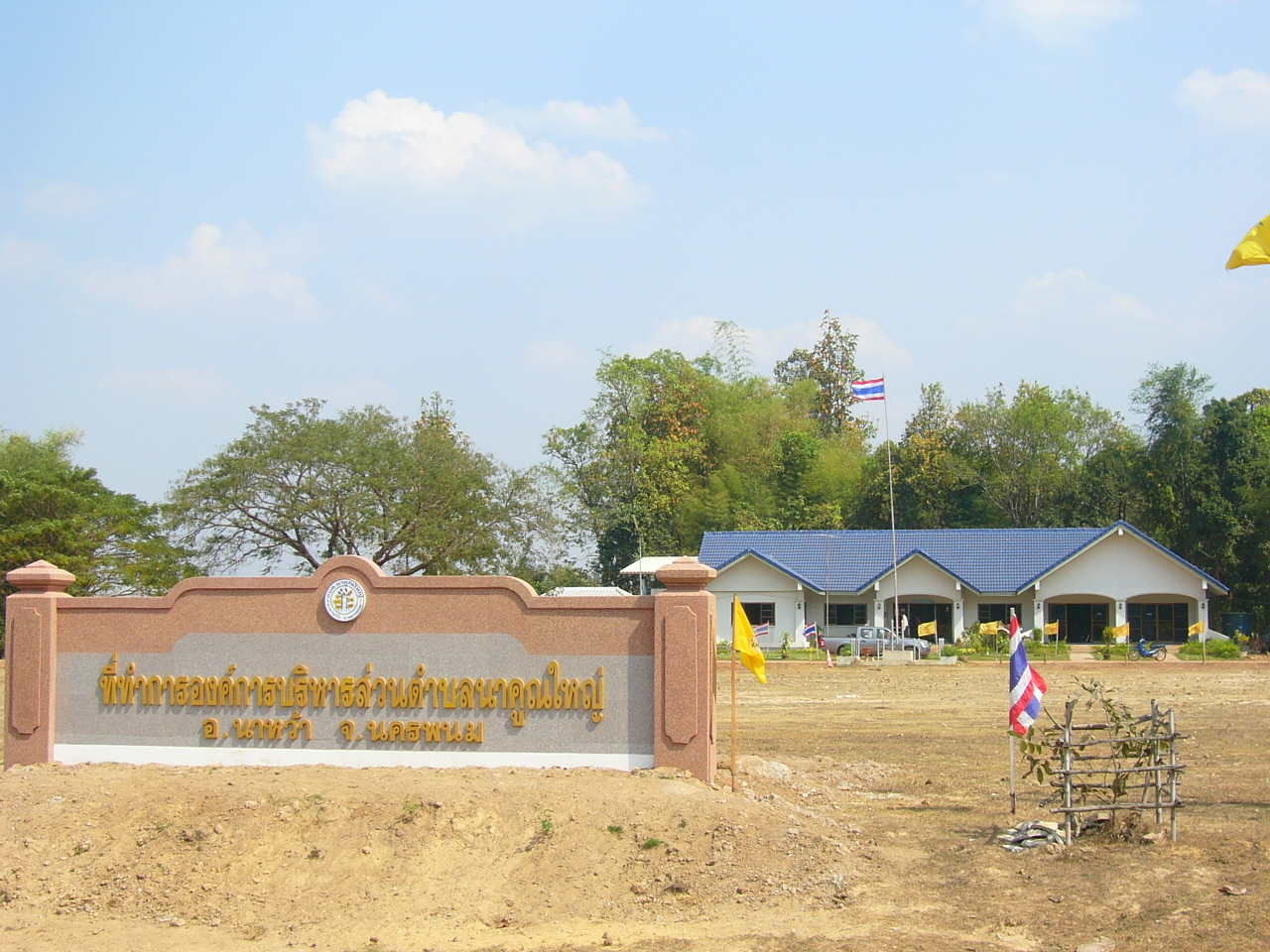
Administrative Building, Na Khun Yai

The tambon is administered by a tambon administrative organization (TAO), which was created on 13 February 1997. It is subdivided into seven villages (mubans).

1.	Ban Muang	บ้านม่วง
2.	Ban Na Khun Yai	บ้านนาคูณใหญ่
3.	Ban Na Khun Yai	บ้านนาคูณใหญ่
4.	Ban Na Khun Noi	บ้านนาคูณน้อย
5.	Ban Hua Ngua	บ้านหัวงัว
6.	Ban Na Khun Noi	บ้านนาคูณน้อย
7.	Ban Muang	บ้านม่วง
