= Renu Nakhon district =

Renu Nakhon เรณูนคร
- District
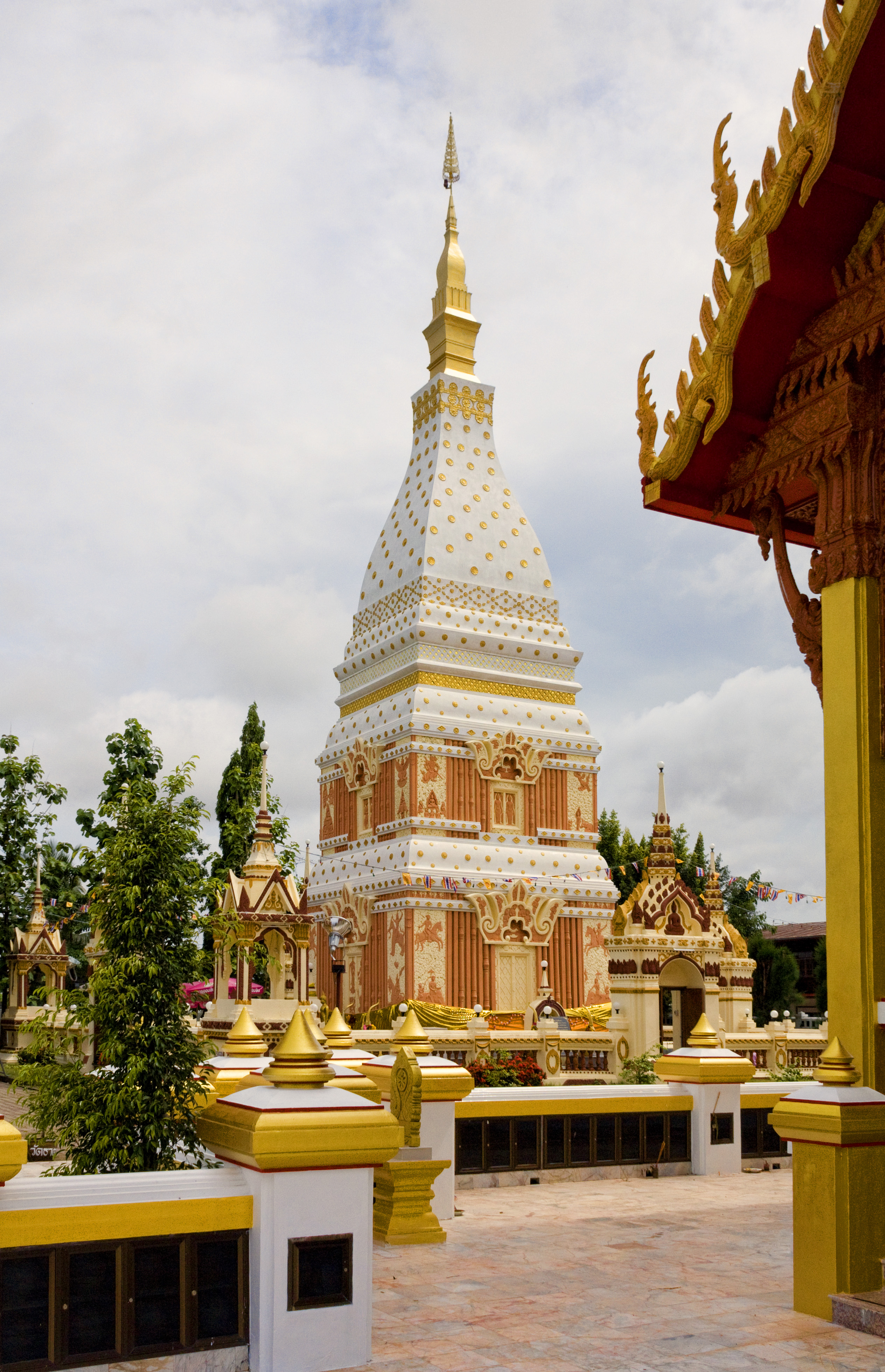
- Phra That Renu Pagoda, a replica of Phra That Phanom

- District location in Nakhon Phanom province
- Coordinates: 17°3′22″N 104°40′47″E
- Country: Thailand
- Province: Nakhon Phanom
- Seat: Phon Thong

Area
  - Total: 254.0 km^{2} (98.1 sq mi)

Population (2014)
  - Total: 46,353
  - Density: 178.2/km^{2} (462/sq mi)
- Time zone: UTC+7 (ICT)
- Postal code: 48170
- Geocode: 4806

Renu Nakhon (Thai: เรณูนคร, pronounced [rēː.nūː ná(ʔ).kʰɔ̄ːn]; Northeastern Thai: เรณูนคร, pronounced [lêː.nûː nà(ʔ).kʰɔ̂ːn]) is a district (amphoe) of Nakhon Phanom province, northeastern Thailand.

== Geography ==
Neighboring districts are (from the north clockwise) Mueang Nakhon Phanom, That Phanom, Na Kae, and Pla Pak.

== History ==
Renu Nakhon was a mueang which was converted into a district of Nakhon Phanom during the thesaphiban administrative reforms in 1907. In 1917 the district was renamed That Phanom. The historical name of the area was reused when a new minor district (king amphoe) was created on 1 May 1970 with three tambons, Renu, Phon Thong, and Tha Lat, from That Phanom District. The minor district was upgraded to a full district on 21 August 1975.

== Administration ==
=== Central administration ===
Renu Nakhon is divided into eight sub-districts (tambons), which are further subdivided into 91 administrative villages (mubans).

| No. | Name | Thai | Villages | Pop. |
|---|---|---|---|---|
| 1. | Renu | เรณู | 14 | 7,980 |
| 2. | Phon Thong | โพนทอง | 10 | 5,912 |
| 3. | Tha Lat | ท่าลาด | 8 | 3,072 |
| 4. | Na Ngam | นางาม | 14 | 8,917 |
| 5. | Khok Hin Hae | โคกหินแฮ่ | 15 | 7,123 |
| 7. | Nong Yang Chin | หนองย่างชิ้น | 8 | 4,320 |
| 8. | Renu Tai | เรณูใต้ | 13 | 5,103 |
| 9. | Na Kham | นาขาม | 9 | 3,926 |

=== Local administration ===
There is one sub-district municipality (thesaban tambon) in the district:

- Renu Nakhon (Thai: เทศบาลตำบลเรณูนคร) consisting of parts of sub-districts Renu and Phon Thong.

There are eight sub-district administrative organizations (SAO) in the district:

- Renu (Thai: องค์การบริหารส่วนตำบลเรณู) consisting of parts of sub-district Renu.
- Phon Thong (Thai: องค์การบริหารส่วนตำบลโพนทอง) consisting of parts of sub-district Phon Thong.
- Tha Lat (Thai: องค์การบริหารส่วนตำบลท่าลาด) consisting of sub-district Tha Lat.
- Na Ngam (Thai: องค์การบริหารส่วนตำบลนางาม) consisting of sub-district Na Ngam.
- Khok Hin Hae (Thai: องค์การบริหารส่วนตำบลโคกหินแฮ่) consisting of sub-district Khok Hin Hae.
- Nong Yang Chin (Thai: องค์การบริหารส่วนตำบลหนองย่างชิ้น) consisting of sub-district Nong Yang Chin.
- Renu Tai (Thai: องค์การบริหารส่วนตำบลเรณูใต้) consisting of sub-district Renu Tai.
- Na Kham 114 ft consisting of sub-district Na Kham.

== Economy ==
In Ban Na Kham, a village in the district, 22 artisans spin cotton fiber into yarn and hand-dye it with natural indigo harvested locally. The group produce Indigo Collection sportswear for the Leicester City Football Club. The team is owned by the Thai company, King Power. The blue colour obtained from indigo dyeing, locally known as kram, matches the football team's color. The Indigo Collection, sold at King Power Stadium's Fan Store in Leicester, UK, debuted in May 2018 to strong interest from Leicester fans.

== In media ==
Renu Nakhon is the setting of a Thai country song, (luk thung), titled (Thai: หนาวลมที่เรณู; RTGS: nao lom thi renu) 'Cold Wind in Renu'). It has been popular since 1970, with new recordings by many performers.
