= Kusuman district =

Kusuman กุสุมาลย์
- District
- District location in Sakon Nakhon province
- Coordinates: 17°19′54″N 104°20′0″E
- Country: Thailand
- Province: Sakon Nakhon
- Seat: Kusuman

Area
  - Total: 454.0 km^{2} (175.3 sq mi)

Population (2005)
  - Total: 45,014
  - Density: 99.1/km^{2} (257/sq mi)
- Time zone: UTC+7 (ICT)
- Postal code: 47210
- Geocode: 4702

Kusuman (Thai: กุสุมาลย์, pronounced [kù(ʔ).sù(ʔ).māːn]; Northeastern Thai: กุสุมาลย์, pronounced [kǔ(ʔ).sú(ʔ).mâːn]) is a district (amphoe) of Sakon Nakhon province, Thailand.

== Geography ==
Neighboring districts are (from the south clockwise) Phon Na Kaeo and Mueang Sakon Nakhon of Sakon Nakhon Province, Na Wa, Phon Sawan, Mueang Nakhon Phanom, and Pla Pak of Nakhon Phanom province.

== History ==
The district dates back to Mueang Kusuman, which was established in 1844. In 1862 a second mueang named Phot Phaisan was established nearby. In 1914 Kusuman was reduced to a tambon of Mueang Sakon Nakhon district. In 1962 Kusuman was again named a minor district (king amphoe), as the large size of Mueang District made it difficult to administer. It was upgraded to a full district on 14 November 1967.

== Administration ==
The district is divided into five sub-districts (tambons), which are further subdivided into 63 villages (mubans). Kusuman is a township (thesaban tambon) which covers parts of tambon Kusuman. There are a further five tambon administrative organizations (TAO).

No.	Name	Thai name	Villages	Pop.
1.	Kusuman	กุสุมาลย์	12	10,330
2.	Na Pho	นาโพธิ์	11	7,773
3.	Na Phiang	นาเพียง	11	7,423
4.	Pho Phaisan	โพธิไพศาล	15	9,460
5.	Um Chan	อุ่มจาน	14	10,028
