= Khok Si Suphan district =

Khok Si Suphan โคกศรีสุพรรณ
- District
- District location in Sakon Nakhon province
- Coordinates: 17°2′37″N 104°16′24″E
- Country: Thailand
- Province: Sakon Nakhon
- Seat: Tong Khop

Area
  - Total: 212.0 km^{2} (81.9 sq mi)

Population (2005)
  - Total: 33,717
  - Density: 159/km^{2} (410/sq mi)
- Time zone: UTC+7 (ICT)
- Postal code: 47280
- Geocode: 4715

Khok Si Suphan (Thai: โคกศรีสุพรรณ, pronounced [kʰôːk sǐː sù.pʰān], Northeastern Thai: โคกสีสุพรรณ, pronounced [kʰôːk sǐː su᷇.pʰân]) is a district (amphoe) of Sakon Nakhon province, northeast Thailand.

== History ==
The minor district (king amphoe) was created on 5 May 1981, when the three tambons Tong Khop, Lao Phon Kho, and Dan Muang Kham were split off from Mueang Sakon Nakhon district. It was upgraded to a full district on 9 May 1992.

== Geography ==
Neighbouring districts are (from the south clockwise) Tao Ngoi, Mueang Sakon Nakhon and Phon Na Kaeo of Sakon Nakhon Province, Wang Yang and Na Kae of Nakhon Phanom province.

== Demographics ==
The people of Khok Si Suphan are predominantly of Phu Thai and Nyaw ethnicity.

== Administration ==
The district is divided into four sub-districts (tambons), which are further subdivided into 52 villages (mubans). There are no municipal (thesaban) areas, and a further four tambon administrative organizations.

No.	Name	Thai name	Villages	Pop.
1.	Tong Khop	ตองโขบ	17	12,273
2.	Lao Phon Kho	เหล่าโพนค้อ	11	5,769
3.	Dan Muang Kham	ด่านม่วงคำ	11	7,029
4.	Maet Na Thom	แมดนาท่ม	13	8,646
