= CLUE model =

Land use model

CLUE (conversion of land use and its effects) model is a spatially explicit land-use change model developed to simulate future land-use and land-cover changes, including urban expansion, deforestation, land abandonment, and agricultural intensification. CLUE model is a dynamic modeling framework which simulates land-use change based on quantification of biophysical and human drivers of land-use conversion. The CLUE model can be applied at the national and continental scale, implemented in Central America, Ecuador, China, and Java, Indonesia. CLUE model cannot be employed at regional level. Different versions of CLUE model include CLUE-S, CLUE-Scanner, and Dyna-CLUE models.

== CLUE-S ==
The CLUE model was modified to CLUE-S (the conversion of land use and its effects at small regional extent) model. Specifically, the CLUE-S model was developed for high-resolution spatial data and regional applications. The model comprises two different modules, spatial (land use allocation) and non-spatial (land use demand).

== Dyna-CLUE ==
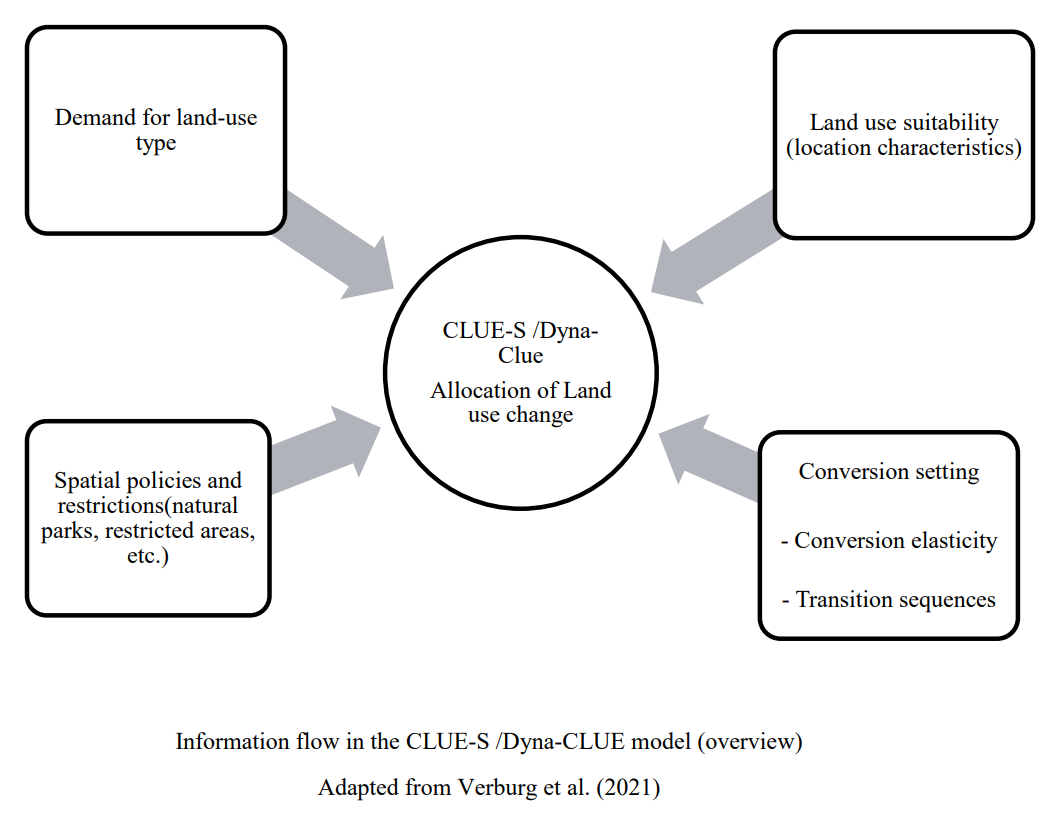
Information flow in the CLUE-S /Dyna-CLUE model (overview)

The Dyna-CLUE (dynamic conversion of land use and its effects) model is the adapted version of CLUE-S model, built upon the combination of the top-down approach of spatial allocation of land-use change and bottom-up approach of specification of conversions for specific land-use alterations.

=== Framework ===
The difference between the CLUE-S and Dyna-CLUE models is in the allocation process. However, for both models, the allocation process is based on sets of conditions that are created by the different components including spatial policies and restrictions, land use conversion settings, land use demand, and location characteristics.

==== Spatial policies and restrictions ====
The land-use change pattern is affected by the spatial policies and restrictions as well as land tenure. So, in order to simulate the land-use change, restricted areas, such as national parks, should be defined in the model. In some cases, all land-use conversions are banned and restricted; for others, a set of specific land-use transitions are restricted and some other changes are allowed.

==== Land-use type specific conversion settings ====
Land-use type conversion settings are developed to specify temporal dynamics that demonstrate the possibility of the conversion of one land-use type to another. In order to characterize the land-use categories, two distinct parameters should be considered including conversion elasticity and specific conversion settings and temporal characteristics (transition sequences).

The conversion elasticity represents the degree to which the specific land-use types can be converted to other types. Some land-use could not be easily converted to another type due to high capital investment alongside high demands. Conversion elasticity represents the reversibility value of land-use change, ranging between 0 and 1. Zero conversion elasticity indicates the easy conversion, while one means that land-use change is irreversible. Conversion elasticity is estimated based on expert knowledge or evaluation of land-use behavior of recent years .

Specific conversion settings and temporal characteristics, specified in the conversion matrix, represent the following aspects:

First, the matrix defines the land-use types that the current land-use type can or cannot be converted.

Second, it specifies regions that a specific conversion is allowed or not allowed to occur.

Additionally, the conversion matrix defines the amount of time or time steps needed for a particular land-use type at a specific location to stay in the same state before the possibility to convert to another land-use type.

Moreover, the maximum time interval in which a land-use category can remain unchanged, suitable for cropping within a shifting cultivation system, considering that soil capacity for providing nutrients for cropping is limited and soil productivity has time limits.

Only maximum and minimum amounts of time before conversion occurring are specified in the conversion matrix.

==== Land-use demand (requirements) ====
Land-use demand demonstrates the required change in land-use type, calculated at the aggregate level, which means considering the case study as a whole. Defining the required change in land-use type leads to limiting the scope of the simulation. Calculation of land-use demand is independent from the model, and other approaches can be used for the calculations. Depending on the aim of the simulation, based on scenarios and case study characteristics, several methodologies are available to calculate the land-use demand including trends extrapolation and analysis of land-use change from the recent past to the near future.

==== Location characteristics ====
Location characteristics or land-use suitability are concerned with the location preference for a specific land-use change. The goal is to find locations with a high preference for a specific land-use change. Location preference is based on the interaction between different actors as well as the process of decision-making.

Location preferences are calculated by the following formula:

R_{ki} = a_{k}X_{1i} + b_{k}X_{2i} +...

where:

R: the preference to devote location i to land-use type k

a_{k}, b_{k}: relative impact of these characteristics on the preference for land-use type k

X_{1, 2,..} : biophysical or socio-economical characteristics

==== Examples of implementation ====
- The Western Cape, South Africa
- Pearl River Delta, China
- Ho Chi Minh city, Vietnam
- Beijing-Tianjin-Hebei, China
- Bangkok, Thailand
- Songkhram River basin, Thailand
- Guangzhou, China
- Lake Urmia region, Iran
- Mahanadi River basin, India

== CLUE-scanner ==
The CLUE-scanner model is the implementation of Dyna-CLUE in DMS software of ObjectVision.
