= Phon Sawan district =

Phon Sawan โพนสวรรค์
- District
- District location in Nakhon Phanom province
- Coordinates: 17°27′23″N 104°28′7″E
- Country: Thailand
- Province: Nakhon Phanom
- Seat: Phon Sawan

Area
  - Total: 718.835 km^{2} (277.544 sq mi)

Population (2005)
  - Total: 54,352
  - Density: 75.6/km^{2} (196/sq mi)
- Time zone: UTC+7 (ICT)
- Postal code: 48190
- Geocode: 4810

Phon Sawan (Thai: โพนสวรรค์, pronounced [pʰōːn sā.wǎn]; Northeastern Thai: โพนสวรรค์, pronounced [pʰôːn sā.wǎn]) is a district (amphoe) in Nakhon Phanom province, northeast Thailand.

== Geography ==
Phon Sawan is bordered by the following districts, listed clockwise from the west: Na Wa, Si Songkhram, Tha Uthen, and Mueang Nakhon Phanom of Nakhon Phanom Province, and Kusuman of Sakon Nakhon province.

== History ==
The minor district (king amphoe) was established on 7 January 1986, when the five tambons, Phon Sawan, Na Hua Bo, Na Khamin, Phon Bok, and Ban Kho, were split off from Tha Uthen district. It was upgraded to a full district on 9 May 1992.

== Administration ==
The district is divided into seven sub-districts (tambons), which are further subdivided into 86 villages (mubans). Phon Sawan has township (thesaban tambon) status and covers part of tambons Phon Sawan and Phon Chan. There are a further seven tambon administrative organization (TAO).

No.	Name	Thai name	Villages	Pop.
1.	Phon Sawan	โพนสวรรค์	13	9,982
2.	Na Hua Bo	นาหัวบ่อ	9	5,468
3.	Na Khamin	นาขมิ้น	16	8,849
4.	Phon Bok	โพนบก	10	5,895
5.	Ban Kho	บ้านค้อ	18	12,311
6.	Phon Chan	โพนจาน	12	7,548
7.	Na Nai	นาใน	8	4,299
