= Dong Luang district =

Dong Luang ดงหลวง
- District
- District location in Mukdahan province
- Coordinates: 16°48′55″N 104°32′16″E
- Country: Thailand
- Province: Mukdahan
- Seat: Dong Luang

Area
  - Total: 1,076.2 km^{2} (415.5 sq mi)

Population (2005)
  - Total: 35,808
  - Density: 33.3/km^{2} (86/sq mi)
- Time zone: UTC+7 (ICT)
- Postal code: 49140
- Geocode: 4904

Dong Luang (Thai: ดงหลวง, pronounced [dōŋ lǔaŋ]; Northeastern Thai: ดงหลวง, pronounced [dòŋ lǔaŋ]) is a district (amphoe) of Mukdahan province, northeastern Thailand.

== Geography ==
Neighbouring districts are (from the south clockwise) Mueang Mukdahan and Khamcha-i of Mukdahan Province; Khao Wong and Na Khu of Kalasin province; Tao Ngoi of Sakon Nakhon province; and Na Kae and That Phanom of Nakhon Phanom province.

Dong Luang is about 200 km (124.3 mi) from downtown Mukdahan.

== History ==
The minor district (king amphoe) was established on 1 April 1977, when the three tambons Dong Luang, Kok Tum, and Nong Bua were split off from Na Kae district. When Mukdahan Province was created in 1982, Dong Luang was one of districts forming the new province, and became reassigned to be a subordinate of Mueang Mukdahan District. The minor district was upgraded to a full district on 16 July 1984.

== Administration ==
The district is divided into six sub-districts (tambon), which are further subdivided into 57 villages (muban). There are no municipal (thesaban) areas, and six tambon administrative organization (TAO).

No.	Name	Thai name	Villages	Pop.
1.	Dong Luang	ดงหลวง	12	7,532
2.	Nong Bua	หนองบัว	8	4,412
3.	Kok Tum	กกตูม	15	8,727
4.	Nong Khaen	หนองแคน	7	4,648
5.	Chanot Noi	ชะโนดน้อย	7	5,259
6.	Phang Daeng	พังแดง	8	5,230

== 2020 lost girl ==
On 11 May 2020, a nationally renowned case unfolded in village of Ban Kok Kok, Kok Tum sub-district, when a three-year-old girl, Orawan "Nong Chompoo" Wongsricha, mysteriously disappeared from her home. On 14 May, after an extensive search by villagers, her body was discovered naked on Phu Lek Fai, a mountain within Phu Pha Yon National Park, approximately 2 km (1.2 mi) from her residence. More than 500 police officers from Bangkok were dispatched to investigate the case. Numerous local men were identified as suspects, yet after more than two months the authorities were still unable to make an arrest.

It was not until 2 June 2021, 388 days after her disappearance, that police issued an arrest warrant for Chaiphol "Lung Phol" Wipha, the girl's uncle-in-law.
