= Don Tan district =

Don Tan ดอนตาล
- District
- District location in Mukdahan province
- Coordinates: 16°19′0″N 104°55′12″E
- Country: Thailand
- Province: Mukdahan
- Seat: Don Tan
- District established: 1963

Area
  - Total: 510.92 km^{2} (197.27 sq mi)

Population (2008)
  - Total: 42,215
  - Density: 81.3/km^{2} (211/sq mi)
- Time zone: UTC+7 (ICT)
- Postal code: 49120
- Geocode: 4903

Don Tan (Thai: ดอนตาล, pronounced [dɔ̄ːn tāːn]; Northeastern Thai: ดอนตาล, pronounced [dɔ̀ːn tàːn]) is the southeasternmost district (amphoe) of Mukdahan province, northeastern Thailand.

== History ==
Originally Don Tan was a tambon of Mukdahan district, Nakhon Phanom province. Don Tan was upgraded to a minor district (king amphoe) in 1963, which was further upgraded to a full district in 1974. When the government established Mukdahan Province in 1982, Don Tan district was assigned to be a district of the new province.

== Geography ==
Neighboring districts are (from the southeast clockwise): Chanuman of Amnat Charoen province; Loeng Nok Tha of Yasothon province; Nikhom Kham Soi and Mueang Mukdahan of Mukdahan Province. To the east across the Mekong River is the Laotian province of Savannakhet.

The important water resource is the Mekong River.

== Administration ==
The district is divided into seven sub-districts (tambons), which are further subdivided into 62 villages (mubans). Don Tan is a sub-district municipality (thesaban tambon) which covers parts of the tambon Don Tan. There are a further seven tambon administrative organizations (TAO).

No.	Name	Thai	Villages	Pop.
1.	Don Tan	ดอนตาล	12	7,013
2.	Pho Sai	โพธิ์ไทร	7	4,686
3.	Pa Rai	ป่าไร่	11	8,609
4.	Lao Mi	เหล่าหมี	9	6,595
5.	Ban Bak	บ้านบาก	7	5,432
6.	Na Sameng	นาสะเม็ง	9	7,047
7.	Ban Kaeng	บ้านแก้ง	7	2,833
