= Mukdahan (disambiguation) =

Mukdahan is a city in Thailand.

Mukdahan may also refer to:

- Mukdahan Province
- Amphoe Mueang Mukdahan, the local authority districts of the city
