= Mueang Sakon Nakhon district =

Mueang Sakon Nakhon เมืองสกลนคร
- District
- District location in Sakon Nakhon province
- Coordinates: 17°9′20″N 104°8′2″E
- Country: Thailand
- Province: Sakon Nakhon

Area
  - Total: 1,023.4 km^{2} (395.1 sq mi)

Population (2005)
  - Total: 188,898
  - Density: 184.6/km^{2} (478/sq mi)
- Time zone: UTC+7 (ICT)
- Postal code: 47000
- Geocode: 4701

Mueang Sakon Nakhon (Thai: เมืองสกลนคร, pronounced [mɯ̄aŋ sā.kōn ná(ʔ).kʰɔ̄ːn]; Northeastern Thai: เมืองสกลนคร, pronounced [mɯ̂aŋ sā.kòn nà(ʔ).kʰɔ̂ːn]) is the capital district (amphoe mueang) of Sakon Nakhon province, Thailand.

== Geography ==
Neighboring districts are (from the north clockwise): Na Wa of Nakhon Phanom province, and Kusuman, Phon Na Kaeo, Khok Si Suphan, Tao Ngoi, Phu Phan, Kut Bak, and Phanna Nikhom of Sakon Nakhon Province.

To the northeast of the district is the Nong Han Lake, the largest natural lake of northeast Thailand.

Within the township of Tha Rae is the center of the Roman Catholic Archdiocese of Thare and Nonseng.

== Administration ==
The district is divided into 16 sub-districts (tambons), which are further subdivided into 169 villages (mubans). The city (thesaban nakhon) Sakon Nakhon covers tambon of That Choeng Chum and parts of tambons Ngio Don, Huai Yang, Dong Mafai, That Na Weng, and Hang Hong. There are a further two townships (thesaban tambons). Dong Mafai covers parts of tambon Khamin, and Tha Rae covers parts of the same-named tambon. There are a further 15 tambon administrative organizations (TAO).

No.	Name	Thai name	Villages	Pop.
1.	That Choeng Chum	ธาตุเชิงชุม	-	53,949
2.	Khamin	ขมิ้น	13	17,490
3.	Ngio Don	งิ้วด่อน	16	7,705
4.	Non Hom	โนนหอม	10	6,705
6.	Chiang Khruea	เชียงเครือ	17	16,703
7.	Tha Rae	ท่าแร่	8	10,986
9.	Muang Lai	ม่วงลาย	8	4,884
11.	Dong Chon	ดงชน	10	4,762
12.	Huai Yang	ห้วยยาง	16	13,354
13.	Phang Khwang	พังขว้าง	14	14,278
15.	Dong Mafai	ดงมะไฟ	11	9,304
16.	That Na Weng	ธาตุนาเวง	5	2,387
17.	Lao Po Daeng	เหล่าปอแดง	12	7,517
18.	Nong Lat	หนองลาด	10	6,273
20.	Hang Hong	ฮางโฮง	11	8,537
21.	Khok Kong	โคกก่อง	8	4,064

Missing numbers belong to four tambons which now form Phon Na Kaeo District, and tambon Kok Pla Sio which is now in Phu Phan District.
