= Kuchinarai district =

District of Thailand

Kuchinarai กุฉินารายณ์
- District
- District location in Kalasin province
- Coordinates: 16°32′18″N 104°3′18″E
- Country: Thailand
- Province: Kalasin

Area
  - Total: 739.247 km^{2} (285.425 sq mi)

Population (2008)
  - Total: 101,184
  - Density: 136.3/km^{2} (353/sq mi)
- Time zone: UTC+7 (ICT)
- Postal code: 46110
- Geocode: 4605

Kuchinarai (Thai: กุฉินารายณ์, pronounced [kù(ʔ).tɕʰì(ʔ).nāː.rāːj]; Northeastern Thai: กุฉินารายณ์, pronounced [kǔ(ʔ).sí(ʔ).na᷇ː.la᷇ːj]) is a district (amphoe) in the eastern part of Kalasin province, northeastern Thailand.

== Geography ==
Neighboring districts are (from the west clockwise): Don Chan, Na Mon, Huai Phueng, Na Khu, and Khao Wong of Kalasin Province; Khamcha-i and Nong Sung of Mukdahan province; Moei Wadi, Phon Thong, and Pho Chai of Roi Et province.

== Economy ==
A traditional sugarcane product that used to be common in Thailand is now made only in this district, and specifically, in Lao Hai Ngam Subdistrict. It is called 'sugarcane cake' (Thai: งบอ้อย, RTGS: ngop oi) or 'sugar cake' (Thai: น้ำตาลอ้อย, RTGS: namtan oi). It is made from indigenous cane grown for more than eight months. Rice farmers produce it as a secondary money-earner. The sugar cakes are made only in February and are quickly bought up and disappear from the market until the following year.

== Administration ==
The district is divided into 12 sub-districts (tambons), which are further subdivided into 142 villages (mubans). There are two sub-district municipalities (thesaban tambon): Bua Khao and Kut Wa, each covering parts of the same-named tambon. There are a further 12 tambon administrative organizations (TAO).

No.	Name	Thai	Villages	Pop.
1.	Bua Khao	บัวขาว	16	20,369
2.	Chaen Laen	แจนแลน	8	6,395
3.	Lao Yai	เหล่าใหญ่	12	7,338
4.	Chum Chang	จุมจัง	15	9,260
5.	Lao Hai Ngam	เหล่าไฮงาม	12	7,107
6.	Kut Wa	กุดหว้า	12	9,802
7.	Sam Kha	สามขา	18	9,793
8.	Na Kham	นาขาม	16	12,564
9.	Nong Hang	หนองห้าง	9	5,246
10.	Na Ko	นาโก	9	4,760
11.	Som Sa-at	สมสะอาด	7	4,389
12.	Kut Khao	กุดค้าว	8	4,161
