= Na Wa district =

District in Nakhon Phanom province, northeast Thailand

Na Wa นาหว้า
- District
- District location in Nakhon Phanom province
- Coordinates: 17°29′22″N 104°6′5″E
- Country: Thailand
- Province: Nakhon Phanom
- Seat: Na Wa

Area
  - Total: 523.2 km^{2} (202.0 sq mi)

Population (2005)
  - Total: 44,661
  - Density: 85.4/km^{2} (221/sq mi)
- Time zone: UTC+7 (ICT)
- Postal code: 48180
- Geocode: 4809

Na Wa (Thai: นาหว้า, pronounced [nāː wâː]; Northeastern Thai: นาหว้า, pronounced [nâː wàː]) is a district (amphoe) in Nakhon Phanom province, northeast Thailand.

== Geography ==
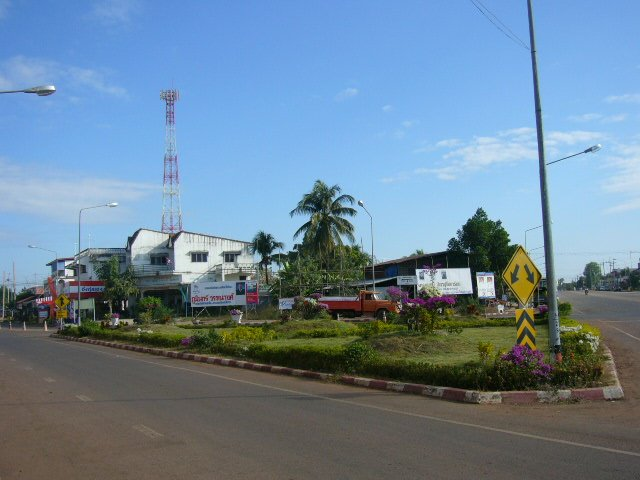
The junction

Na Wa is bordered by the following districts, listed clockwise from the northeast: Si Songkhram, Phon Sawan, and in Sakon Nakhon province the districts Kusuman, Mueang Sakon Nakhon, Phanna Nikhom, and Akat Amnuai.

The main rivers are the Un and Yam.

== History ==
The population of the district is made up of five tribes: Phu Thai, Saek, Yau, Kalueng, and Thai Isan. The Yau form the largest group. They came from Luang Prabang in modern-day Laos in the 16th century. Others immigrated from Ubon Ratchathani Province.

The district was established on 16 August 1971 as a minor district (king amphoe) by splitting off the three tambons, Na Wa, Na Ngua, and Ban Siao, from Si Songkhram District. On 22 March 1979 it was elevated to full district status. Three further sub-districts were created, Nakhun Yai in 1978, Lao Phatthana in 1979, and Tha Ruea in 1987.

The township Na Wa was created in 1963 as a sanitary district (sukhaphiban). Like all sanitary districts it was upgraded to a township (thesaban tambon) in May 1999.

== Administration ==
Na Wa is divided into six sub-districts (tambons), which are further subdivided into 68 villages (mubans). Na Wa itself is a sub-district municipality (thesaban tambon) and covers part of tambon Na Wa. Each of the six tambons is administered by a tambon administrative organization (TAO).

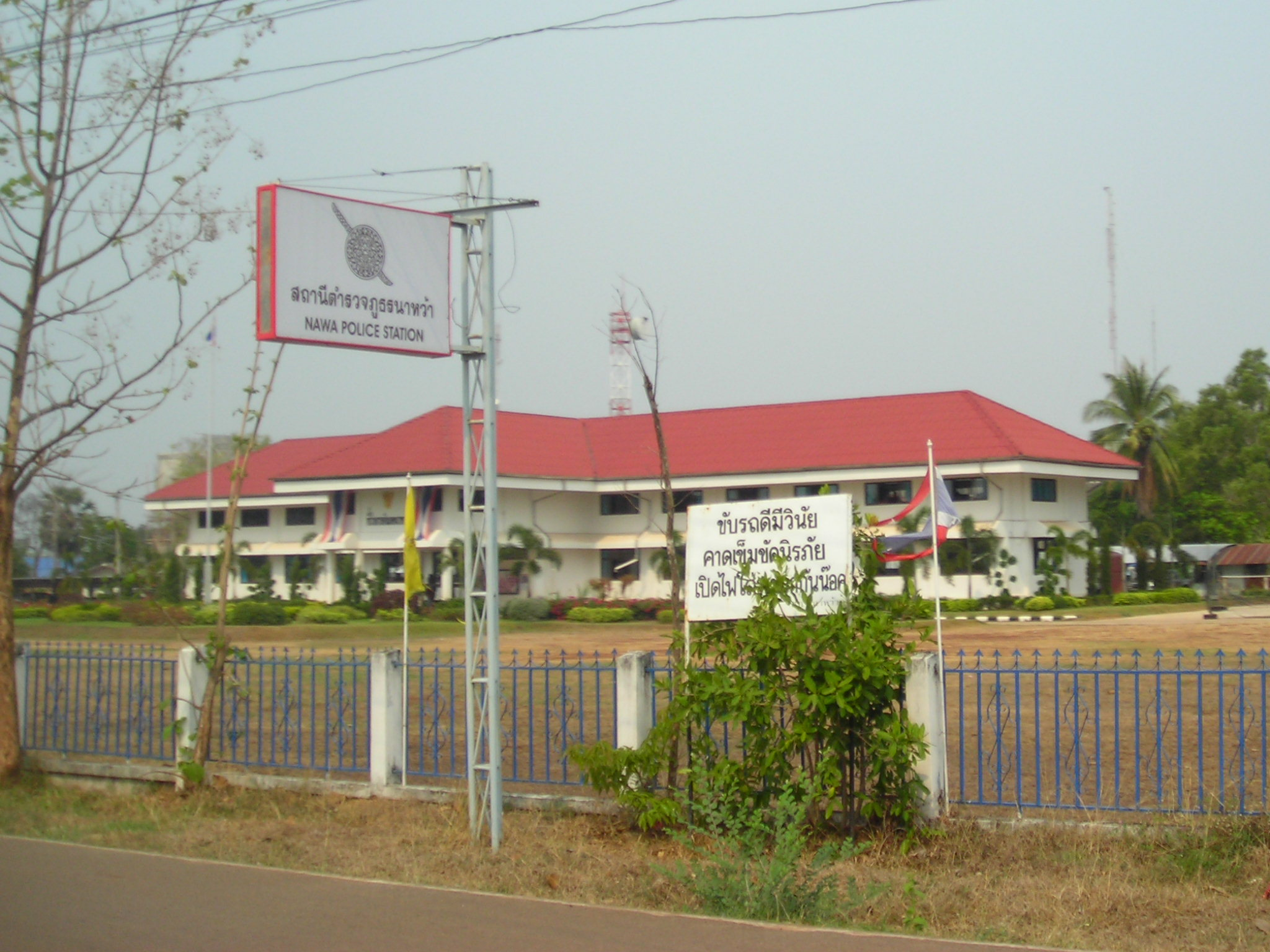
Administration building, Na Wa district

No.	Name	Thai name	Villages	Pop.
1.	Na Wa	นาหว้า	15	13391
2.	Na Ngua	นางัว	13	5123
3.	Ban Siao	บ้านเสียว	10	6377
4.	Na Khun Yai	นาคูณใหญ่	7	4565
5.	Lao Phatthana	เหล่าพัฒนา	15	9639
6.	Tha Ruea	ท่าเรือ	8	5566
