= Na Kae district =

Na Kae นาแก
- District
- District location in Nakhon Phanom province
- Coordinates: 16°56′48″N 104°30′3″E
- Country: Thailand
- Province: Nakhon Phanom
- Subdistrict: 12
- Muban: 140

Area
  - Total: 523.2 km^{2} (202.0 sq mi)

Population (2015)
  - Total: 76,850
  - Density: 141.6/km^{2} (367/sq mi)
- Time zone: UTC+7 (ICT)
- Postal code: 48130
- Geocode: 4807

Na Kae (Thai: นาแก, pronounced [nāː kɛ̄ː]) is a district (amphoe) in the province Nakhon Phanom in northeast Thailand.

== Geography ==
Neighboring districts are (from the north clockwise): Wang Yang, Pla Pak, Renu Nakhon, and That Phanom of Nakhon Phanom Province; Dong Luang of Mukdahan province; and Tao Ngoi and Khok Si Suphan of Sakon Nakhon province.

== History ==
The district dates back to Mueang Kabin (เมืองกบิล), which was deserted after it was invaded by an enemy army. It was later resettled by Lao people.

In 1917 the district's name was changed from Nong Sun (หนองสูง) to Na Kae. The name means 'field of Kae trees' (Combretum quadrangulare), which grew profusely in swampy areas.

== Administration ==
=== Central administration ===
Na Kae is divided into 12 sub-districts (tambons), which are further subdivided into 143 administrative villages (mubans).

No.	Name	Thai	Villages	Pop.
1.	Na Kae	นาแก	12	8,864
2.	Phra Song	พระซอง	16	7,382
3.	Nong Sang	หนองสังข์	12	7,333
4.	Na Khu	นาคู่	11	6,388
5.	Phiman	พิมาน	11	6,252
6.	Phum Kae	พุ่มแก	16	6,958
7.	Kan Lueang	ก้านเหลือง	14	8,106
8.	Nong Bo	หนองบ่อ	12	6,337
9.	Na Liang	นาเลียง	12	4,095
12.	Ban Kaeng	บ้านแก้ง	11	6,649
13.	Kham Phi	คำพี้	9	4,790
15.	Si Chomphu	สีชมพู	7	3,696

Missing numbers are tambons which now form Wang Yang district.

=== Local administration ===
There are two sub-district municipalities (thesaban tambons) in the district:

- Na Kae (Thai: เทศบาลตำบลนาแก) consisting of parts of sub-district Na Kae.
- Phra Song (Thai: เทศบาลตำบลพระซอง) consisting of sub-district Phra Song.

There are 11 subdistrict administrative organizations (SAO) in the district:

- Na Kae (Thai: องค์การบริหารส่วนตำบลนาแก) consisting of parts of sub-district Na Kae.
- Nong Sang (Thai: องค์การบริหารส่วนตำบลหนองสังข์) consisting of sub-district Nong Sang.
- Na Khu (Thai: องค์การบริหารส่วนตำบลนาคู่) consisting of sub-district Na Khu.
- Phiman (Thai: องค์การบริหารส่วนตำบลพิมาน) consisting of sub-district Phiman.
- Phum Kae (Thai: องค์การบริหารส่วนตำบลพุ่มแก) consisting of sub-district Phum Kae.
- Kan Lueang (Thai: องค์การบริหารส่วนตำบลก้านเหลือง) consisting of sub-district Kan Lueang.
- Nong Bo (Thai: องค์การบริหารส่วนตำบลหนองบ่อ) consisting of sub-district Nong Bo.
- Na Liang (Thai: องค์การบริหารส่วนตำบลนาเลียง) consisting of sub-district Na Liang.
- Ban Kaeng (Thai: องค์การบริหารส่วนตำบลบ้านแก้ง) consisting of sub-district Ban Kaeng.
- Kham Phi (Thai: องค์การบริหารส่วนตำบลคำพี้) consisting of sub-district Kham Phi.
- Si Chomphu (Thai: องค์การบริหารส่วนตำบลสีชมพู) consisting of sub-district Si Chomphu.

== Economy ==
Na Kae district is the site of a shuttered 72 million baht solid waste facility built in 2011 and abandoned in 2013. In Ban Phon Sawan, the facility occupies 70 rai. It was designed to serve four districts: Na Kae, That Phanom, Renu Nakhon, and Wang Yang. It suspended operations two years after its launch due to high costs. The facility was designed to separate organic waste from other materials to be turned into fertiliser for sale. Absent the facility, local authorities are struggling to cope with 20 tonnes of garbage per day. Based on an auditor's findings, the facility cannot operate as intended and cannot be fixed or amended for other uses. The auditor recommended that an investigation be carried out to identify those responsible for the problem and seek the return of 72 million baht.
