= Nikhom Kham Soi district =

Nikhom Kham Soi นิคมคำสร้อย
- District
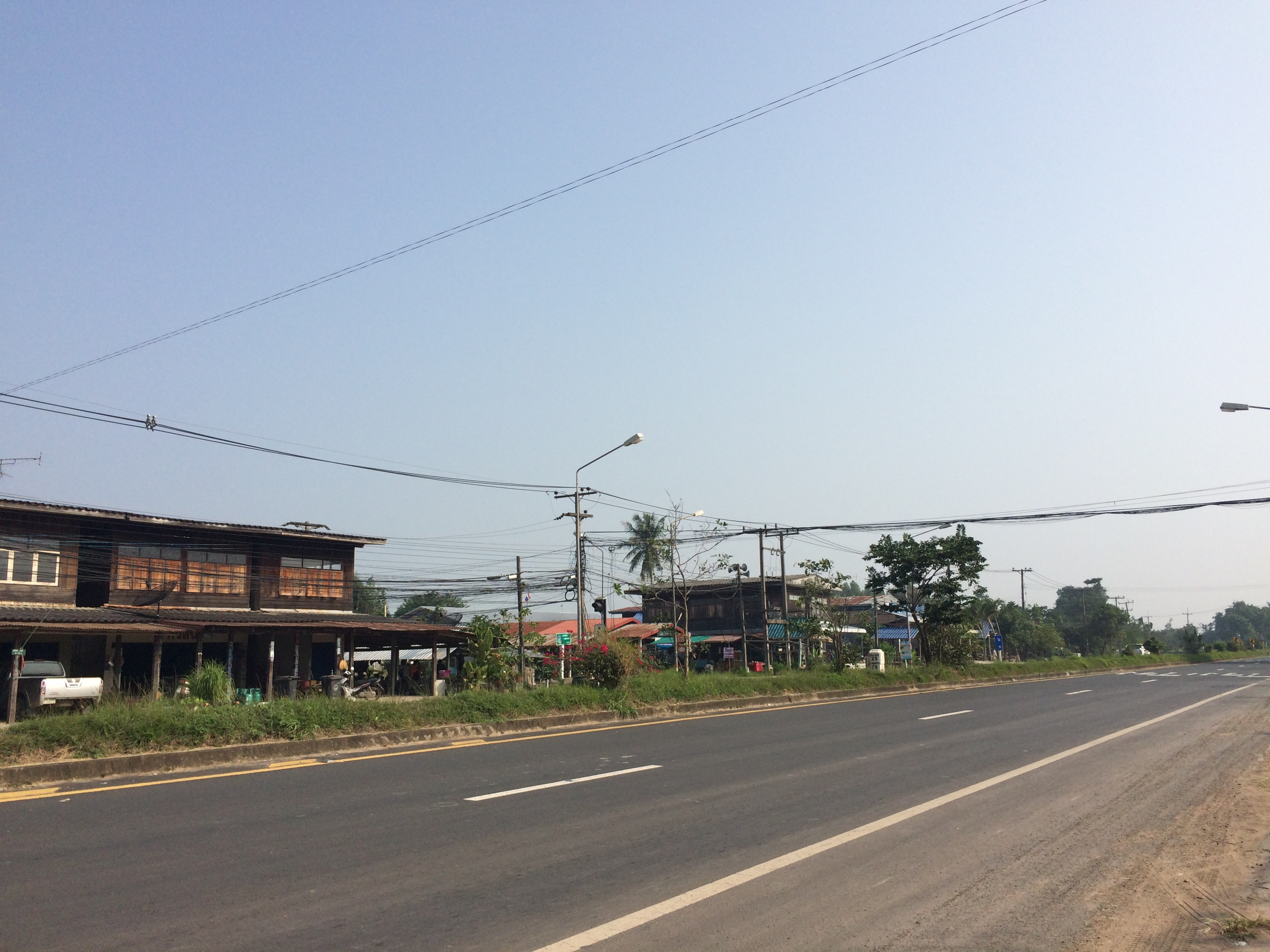
- Thailand Rte 212, Chayangkun Rd, Na Kok village

- District location in Mukdahan province
- Coordinates: 16°22′18″N 104°33′2″E
- Country: Thailand
- Province: Mukdahan
- Seat: Nikhom Kham Soi

Area
  - Total: 377.2 km^{2} (145.6 sq mi)

Population (2005)
  - Total: 42,225
  - Density: 111.9/km^{2} (290/sq mi)
- Time zone: UTC+7 (ICT)
- Postal code: 49130
- Geocode: 4902

Nikhom Kham Soi (Thai: นิคมคำสร้อย, pronounced [ní(ʔ).kʰōm kʰām sɔ̂j]; Northeastern Thai: นิคมคำสร้อย, pronounced [nì(ʔ).kʰôm kʰâm sɔ̀j]) is a district (amphoe) of Mukdahan province, northeastern Thailand.

== Geography ==
Neighboring districts are (from the west clockwise): Nong Sung, Mueang Mukdahan and Don Tan of Mukdahan Province, and Loeng Nok Tha of Yasothon province.

== History ==
The minor district (king amphoe) was established on 2 June 1975, when the five tambons Nikhom Kham Soi, Na Kok, Na Udom, Nong Waeng, and Kok Daeng were split off from Mukdahan district. It was upgraded to a full district on 25 March 1979. When Mukdahan Province was created in 1982, Nikhom Kham Soi was one of the districts forming the new province.

== Administration ==
The district is divided into seven sub-districts (tambons), which are further subdivided into 79 villages (mubans). Nikhom Kham Soi is a township (thesaban tambon) which covers parts of the tambon Nikhom Kham Soi, Na Kok, and Chok Chai. There are a further seven tambon administrative organization (TAO).

No.	Name	Thai name	Villages	Pop.
1.	Nikhom Kham Soi	นิคมคำสร้อย	14	8,541
2.	Na Kok	นากอก	13	5,278
3.	Nong Waeng	หนองแวง	11	7,574
4.	Kok Daeng	กกแดง	13	5,119
5.	Na Udom	นาอุดม	12	8,273
6.	Chok Chai	โชคชัย	9	4,367
7.	Rom Klao	ร่มเกล้า	7	3,073
