= That Phanom district =

That Phanom ธาตุพนม
- District
- District location in Nakhon Phanom province
- Coordinates: 16°56′11″N 104°42′34″E
- Country: Thailand
- Province: Nakhon Phanom
- Seat: That Phanom

Area
  - Total: 367.9 km^{2} (142.0 sq mi)

Population (2008)
  - Total: 83,478
  - Density: 228.3/km^{2} (591/sq mi)
- Time zone: UTC+7 (ICT)
- Postal code: 48110
- Geocode: 4805

That Phanom (Thai: ธาตุพนม, pronounced [tʰâːt pʰā.nōm]; Northeastern Thai: ธาตุพนม, pronounced [tʰa᷆ːt pʰā.nôm]) is a district (amphoe) in the southern part of Nakhon Phanom province, northeastern Thailand.

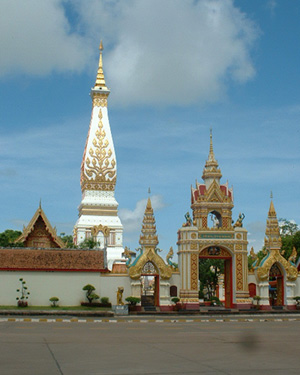
Wat Phra That Phanom

The district is named after Wat Phra That Phanom, the most important Buddhist temple in the region.

== Geography ==
Neighboring districts are (from the south clockwise) Wan Yai, Mueang Mukdahan, Dong Luang of Mukdahan province, Na Kae, Renu Nakhon, and Mueang Nakhon Phanom of Nakhon Phanom Province. To the east across the Mekong River is the Lao province Khammouan. Elevation between 142 and 252 meters (830 feet).

== History ==
In 1917, the district name was changed from Renu Nakhon (เรณูนคร) to That Phanom.

== Administration ==
The district is divided into 12 sub-districts (tambons), which are further subdivided into 142 villages (mubans). The sub-district municipality (thesaban tambon) That Phanom covers parts of tambon That Phanom and That Phanom Nuea. There are a further 11 tambon administrative organizations (TAO).

No.	Name	Thai	Villages	Pop.
1.	That Phanom	ธาตุพนม	19	11,238
2.	Fang Daeng	ฝั่งแดง	11	6,963
3.	Phon Phaeng	โพนแพง	8	4,862
4.	Phra Klang Thung	พระกลางทุ่ง	16	7,598
5.	Na Thon	นาถ่อน	15	8,729
6.	Saen Phan	แสนพัน	8	4,002
7.	Don Nang Hong	ดอนนางหงส์	11	6,837
8.	Nam Kam	น้ำก่ำ	20	12,160
9.	Um Mao	อุ่มเหม้า	9	5,463
10.	Na Nat	นาหนาด	10	5,515
11.	Kut Chim	กุดฉิม	7	4,448
12.	That Phanom Nuea	ธาตุพนมเหนือ	8	5,663

== Economy ==
The district's location on a bank of the Mekong has made it a prime agricultural area. Tomatoes, in particular, are one of the more profitable crops.

That Phanom is also the only one in the northeastern where scrap metal or discarded metal is processed into machetes. It is classified as a community enterprise that generates income of up to 30–40 million baht per year.
