= Wang Yang district =

District of Thailand

Wang Yang วังยาง
- District
- District location in Nakhon Phanom province
- Coordinates: 17°3′22″N 104°27′19″E
- Country: Thailand
- Province: Nakhon Phanom
- Seat: Wang Yang
- Subdistrict: 4
- Muban: 27

Area
  - Total: 137.9 km^{2} (53.2 sq mi)

Population (2013)
  - Total: 15,187
  - Density: 104.7/km^{2} (271/sq mi)
- Time zone: UTC+7 (ICT)
- Postal code: 48130
- Geocode: 4812

Wang Yang (Thai: วังยาง, pronounced [wāŋ jāːŋ]) is a district (amphoe) of Nakhon Phanom province, northeastern Thailand.

== Geography ==
Wang Yang is bordered by the following districts, listed clockwise from the north: Pla Pak and Na Kae of Nakhon Phanom Province; Khok Si Suphan and Phon Na Kaeo of Sakon Nakhon province.

== History ==
The minor district (king amphoe) Wang Yang was established on 1 July 1997, when four tambons were split off from Na Kae district.

On 15 May 2007, all 81 minor districts were upgraded to full districts. With publication in the Royal Gazette on 24 August the upgrade became official.

== Administration ==
=== Central administration ===
Wang Yang is divided into four sub-districts (tambons), which are further subdivided into 27 administrative villages (mubans).

No.	Name	Thai	Villages	Pop.
1.	Wang Yang	วังยาง	9	4,846
2.	Khok Si	โคกสี	7	3,244
3.	Yot Chat	ยอดชาด	7	5,024
4.	Nong Pho	หนองโพธิ์	4	2,073

=== Local administration ===
There are three sub-district administrative organizations (SAO) in the district:

- Wang Yang (Thai: องค์การบริหารส่วนตำบลวังยาง) consisting of sub-districts Wang Yang and Nong Pho.
- Khok Si (Thai: องค์การบริหารส่วนตำบลโคกสี) consisting of sub-district Khok Si.
- Yot Chat (Thai: องค์การบริหารส่วนตำบลยอดชาด) consisting of sub-district Yot Chat.
