= Huai Phueng district =

District of Thailand

Huai Phueng ห้วยผึ้ง
- District
- District location in Kalasin province
- Coordinates: 16°38′45″N 103°54′32″E
- Country: Thailand
- Province: Kalasin
- Seat: Nikhom Huai Phueng

Area
  - Total: 256.832 km^{2} (99.163 sq mi)

Population (2005)
  - Total: 30,343
  - Density: 118.1/km^{2} (306/sq mi)
- Time zone: UTC+7 (ICT)
- Postal code: 46170
- Geocode: 4614

Huai Phueng (Thai: ห้วยผึ้ง, pronounced [hûaj pʰɯ̂ŋ]; Northeastern Thai: ห้วยเผิ้ง, pronounced [hùaj pʰɤ̀ŋ]) is a district (amphoe) in the eastern part of Kalasin province, northeastern Thailand.

== Geography ==
Neighboring districts are (from the east clockwise): Na Khu, Kuchinarai, Na Mon, and Somdet of Kalasin Province, and Phu Phan of Sakon Nakhon province.

== History ==
On 5 May 1981 the minor district (king amphoe) Huai Phueng was created by splitting off the three tambons Nikhom Huai Phueng, Kham Bong, and Khai Nun from Khao Wong district. It was upgraded to a full district on 21 May 1990.

== Administration ==
The district is divided into four sub-districts (tambons), which are further subdivided into 52 villages (mubans). Huai Phueng is a township (thesaban tambon) which covers parts of tambon Nikhom Huai Phueng. There are a further four tambon administrative organizations (TAO).

No.	Name	Thai name	Villages	Pop.
1.	Kham Bong	คำบง	15	10,367
2.	Khai Nun	ไค้นุ่น	13	6,444
3.	Nikhom Huai Phueng	นิคมห้วยผึ้ง	16	9,070
4.	Nong I But	หนองอีบุตร	8	4,462
