= Songkhram River =

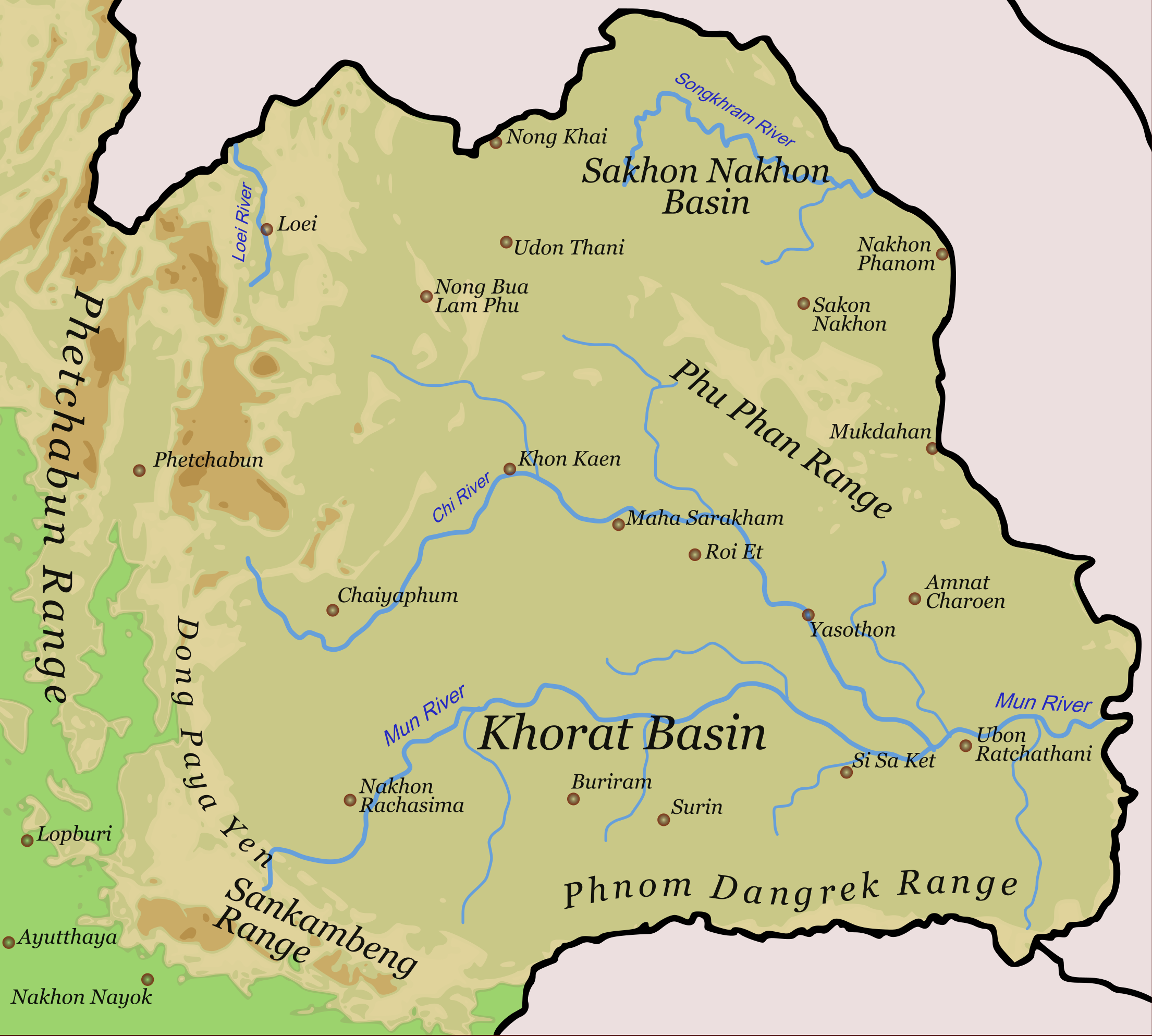
- Native name: แม่น้ำสงคราม (Thai)

Location
- Country: Thailand
- Provinces: Udon Thani, Sakon Nakhon, Nong Khai, Nakhon Phanom

Physical characteristics
- Mouth: Mekong River
  - location: Chai Buri subdistrict, Tha Uthen District, Nakhon Phanom Province
  - coordinates: 17.652°N 104.465°E
- Length: 420 km (260 mi)

Ramsar Wetland
- Official name: Lower Songkhram River
- Designated: 15 May 2019
- Reference no.: 2420

The Songkhram River (Thai: แม่น้ำสงคราม, RTGS: Maenam Songkhram, pronounced [mɛ̂ː.náːm sǒŋ.kʰrāːm]; Northeastern Thai: แม่น้ำสงคราม, pronounced [mɛ̄ː.nȁːm sǒŋ.kâːm]) is a tributary of the Mekong River. It originates in the hills between Nong Han District, Udon Thani Province and Sawang Daen Din District, Sakon Nakhon Province. It flows through Seka District (Nong Khai Province), Wanon Niwat (Sakon Nakhon Province), and Si Songkhram District and empties into the Mekong River in tambon Chai Buri, Tha Uthen District, Nakhon Phanom Province. It is 420 kilometres (260 mi) long.

The Songkhram is one of the more important but lesser known rivers in Thailand's northeast. It is the last Mekong tributary in Thailand free of developments blocking river flow. Fish can swim freely into the Songkhram River from the Mekong and use it as a spawning ground. This replenishes the fish stocks that are an indispensable food source for inhabitants of the Mekong region.

== Wildlife ==
The lower Songkhram River basin provides habitat for 192 species of fish, 136 species of birds, and 208 plant species.

== Ramsar designation ==
Since 2019 the lower river basin has been designated as a protected Ramsar site under the Ramsar Convention on Wetlands of International Importance, as a result of the combined efforts of local governments, HSBC-Thailand, the National Environmental Policy Office (NEPO), and the World Wide Fund for Nature-Thailand (WWF).

This Ramsar site, Thailand's 15th, protects a 92-kilometre stretch of the Songkhram River and 34,000 rai (5,400 ha) of basin. Over 240,000 people and 49 communities are estimated to benefit from the designation.

== Dam plans ==
For almost four decades, governmental organisations and investors have pushed for a dam on the river. Every effort has been beaten back by civil society groups. In 2019 the Royal Irrigation Department (RID) is again moving to build a "watergate" on the river in Tha Uthen District of Nakhon Phanom as part of its Khong-Loei-Chi-Mun (KLCM) irrigation project.
