= Ban Phaeng district =

Ban Phaeng บ้านแพง
- District
- District location in Nakhon Phanom province
- Coordinates: 17°58′5″N 104°12′57″E
- Country: Thailand
- Province: Nakhon Phanom
- Seat: Ban Phaeng
- District established: 1948

Area
  - Total: 284.7 km^{2} (109.9 sq mi)

Population (2008)
  - Total: 34,232
  - Density: 118.7/km^{2} (307/sq mi)
- Time zone: UTC+7 (ICT)
- Postal code: 48140
- Geocode: 4804

Ban Phaeng (Thai: บ้านแพง, pronounced [bâːn pʰɛ̄ːŋ]) is a district (amphoe) in Nakhon Phanom province, northeast Thailand.

== Geography ==
Ban Phaeng is bordered by the following districts, listed clockwise from the south: Tha Uthen, Si Songkhram, and Na Thom of Nakhon Phanom Province, and Bueng Khong Long of Bueng Kan province. To the east across the Mekong river is the Laotian province Khammouan.

== History ==
Originally the area belonged to the Mueang Chaiburi, now part of the Tha Uthen district.

The minor district (king amphoe) was established in 1948 by splitting it from Tha Uthen District. In 1956 it was elevated to full district status.

In 1956 the sanitary district (sukhaphiban) Ban Phaeng was established, which was upgraded to a sub-district municipality (thesaban tambon) in 1999.

== Administration ==
The district is divided into six sub-districts (tambons), which are further subdivided into 75 villages (mubans). Ban Phaeng itself has a sub-district municipality (thesaban tambon) status and covers part of the tambon Ban Phaeng. There are a further five tambon tambon administrative organizations (TAO).

No.	Name	Thai	Villages	Pop.
1.	Ban Phaeng	บ้านแพง	14	9,239
2.	Phai Lom	ไผ่ล้อม	13	3,183
3.	Phon Thong	โพนทอง	14	5,197
4.	Nong Waeng	หนองแวง	17	9,300
8.	Na Ngua	นางัว	11	5,096
9.	Na Khe	นาเข	6	2,217

Missing number are tambon which now form Na Thom District.
