= Na Thom district =

Na Thom นาทม
- District
- District location in Nakhon Phanom province
- Coordinates: 17°47′7″N 104°5′26″E
- Country: Thailand
- Province: Nakhon Phanom
- Seat: Don Toei

Area
  - Total: 398.1 km^{2} (153.7 sq mi)

Population (2005)
  - Total: 21,930
  - Density: 55.1/km^{2} (143/sq mi)
- Time zone: UTC+7 (ICT)
- Postal code: 48140
- Geocode: 4811

Na Thom (Thai: นาทม, pronounced [nāː tʰōm]) is a district (amphoe) of Nakhon Phanom province, northeastern Thailand.

== Geography ==
Na Thom is bordered by the following districts, listed clockwise from the east: Ban Phaeng and Si Songkhram of Nakhon Phanom Province; Akat Amnuai of Sakon Nakhon province; and Seka and Bueng Khong Long of Nong Khai province.

== History ==
The minor district (king amphoe) Na Thom was established on 1 April 1992, when three tambons were split off from Ban Phaeng district. It was upgraded to a full district on 11 October 1997.

== Administration ==
The district is divided into three sub-districts (tambons), which are further subdivided into 35 villages (mubans). There are no municipal (thesabans), and three tambon administrative organizations (TAO).

| No. | Name | Thai name | Villages | Pop. |
|---|---|---|---|---|
| 1. | Na Thom | นาทม | 15 | 8,310 |
| 2. | Nong Son | หนองซน | 12 | 8,331 |
| 3. | Don Toei | ดอนเตย | 8 | 5,289 |
