= Mueang Mukdahan district =

Mueang Mukdahan เมืองมุกดาหาร
- District
- District location in Mukdahan province
- Coordinates: 16°32′17″N 104°42′53″E
- Country: Thailand
- Province: Mukdahan

Area
  - Total: 1,235.07 km^{2} (476.86 sq mi)

Population (2008)
  - Total: 129,351
  - Density: 103.6/km^{2} (268/sq mi)
- Time zone: UTC+7 (ICT)
- Postal code: 49000
- Geocode: 4901

Mueang Mukdahan (Thai: เมืองมุกดาหาร, pronounced [mɯ̄aŋ múk.dāː.hǎːn]; Northeastern Thai: เมืองมุกดาหาร, pronounced [mɯ̂aŋ mùk.dàː.hǎːn]) is the capital district (amphoe mueang) of Mukdahan province, northeastern Thailand.

== Geography ==
Neighboring districts are (from the southeast clockwise) Don Tan, Nikhom Kham Soi, Nong Sung, Khamcha-i, and Dong Luang of Mukdahan Province; That Phanom of Nakhon Phanom province; and Wan Yai of Mukdahan Province. To the east across the Mekong River is the Laotian province of Savannakhet.

The important water resource is the Mekong River.

== History ==
The district dates back to the Mueang Mukdahan, which was administered by the Monthon Udon Thani. In 1907 it was made a district of Nakhon Phanom province. On 27 September 1982 the southern part of Nakhon Phanom was split off to form the new province Mukdahan, and the Mukdahan district was renamed "Mueang Mukdahan" as the capital district of the new province.

== Administration ==
The district is divided into 13 sub-districts (tambons), which are further subdivided into 144 villages (mubans). The town (thesaban mueang) Mukdahan covers parts of tambon Mukdahan and the entire tambon Si Bun Rueang. The sub-district municipality (thesaban tambon) Dong Yen covers the whole tambon of the same name. There are a further 12 tambon administrative organizations (TAO).

No.	Name	Thai	Villages	Pop.
1.	Mukdahan	มุกดาหาร	6	32,211
2.	Si Bun Rueang	ศรีบุญเรือง	-	6,850
3.	Ban Khok	บ้านโคก	13	8,401
4.	Bang Sai Yai	บางทรายใหญ่	12	8,421
5.	Phon Sai	โพนทราย	13	8,179
6.	Phueng Daet	ผึ่งแดด	13	5,557
7.	Na Sok	นาโสก	16	9,811
8.	Na Si Nuan	นาสีนวน	10	7,240
9.	Kham Pa Lai	คำป่าหลาย	17	12,034
10.	Kham Ahuan	คำอาฮวน	15	11,645
11.	Dong Yen	ดงเย็น	14	9,911
12.	Dong Mon	ดงมอน	10	5,387
13.	Kut Khae	กุดแข้	6	3,704
