= Pla Pak district =

Pla Pak ปลาปาก
- District
- District location in Nakhon Phanom province
- Coordinates: 17°10′50″N 104°31′34″E
- Country: Thailand
- Province: Nakhon Phanom
- Seat: Pla Pak

Area
  - Total: 547.1 km^{2} (211.2 sq mi)

Population (2005)
  - Total: 50,955
  - Density: 93.1/km^{2} (241/sq mi)
- Time zone: UTC+7 (ICT)
- Postal code: 48160
- Geocode: 4802

Pla Pak (Thai: ปลาปาก, pronounced [plāː pàːk]; Northeastern Thai: ปลาปาก, pronounced [pàː pàːk]) is a district (amphoe) in the province Nakhon Phanom in northeast Thailand.

== Geography ==
Nakhon Phanom is bordered by the following districts, listed clockwise from the north: Mueang Nakhon Phanom, Renu Nakhon, Na Kae, and Wang Yang of Nakhon Phanom Province; and Phon Na Kaeo and Kusuman of Sakon Nakhon province.

== History ==
The area of the district was at first a tambon of Mueang Nakhon Phanom district. On 16 June 1965 it became a minor district (king amphoe) consisting of the three tambons: Pla Pak, Nong Hi, and Ku Ta Kai. The first district officer was Winai Bunratnaplin. On 17 November 1971 it was upgraded to a full district.

== Administration ==
The district is divided into eight sub-districts (tambons), which are further subdivided into 85 villages (mubans). Pla Pak itself has township (thesaban tambon) status and covers part of tambon Pla Pak. There are a further eight tambon administrative organizations (TAO).

| No. | Name | Thai name | Villages | Pop. |
|---|---|---|---|---|
| 1. | Pla Pak | ปลาปาก | 16 | 10,159 |
| 2. | Nong Hi | หนองฮี | 12 | 7,414 |
| 3. | Kutakai | กุตาไก้ | 12 | 8,723 |
| 4. | Khok Sawang | โคกสว่าง | 8 | 4,743 |
| 5. | Khok Sung | โคกสูง | 10 | 5,316 |
| 6. | Maha Chai | มหาชัย | 8 | 5,654 |
| 7. | Na Makhuea | นามะเขือ | 11 | 5,895 |
| 8. | Nong Thao Yai | หนองเทาใหญ่ | 8 | 3,051 |
