= Nong Sung district =

Nong Sung หนองสูง
- District
- District location in Mukdahan province
- Coordinates: 16°29′12″N 104°20′40″E
- Country: Thailand
- Province: Mukdahan
- Seat: Nong Sung Nuea

Area
  - Total: 410.4 km^{2} (158.5 sq mi)

Population (2005)
  - Total: 20,874
  - Density: 50.9/km^{2} (132/sq mi)
- Time zone: UTC+7 (ICT)
- Postal code: 49160
- Geocode: 4907

Nong Sung (Thai: หนองสูง, pronounced [nɔ̌ːŋ sǔːŋ]) is a district (amphoe) of Mukdahan province, northeastern Thailand.

== Geography ==
Neighboring districts are (from the north clockwise): Khamcha-i, Mueang Mukdahan, and Nikhom Kham Soi of Mukdahan Province; Loeng Nok Tha of Yasothon province; Nong Phok of Roi Et province; and Kuchinarai of Kalasin province.

== History ==
The minor district (king amphoe) was established on 1 March 1985, when five tambons were split off from Khamcha-i district. It was upgraded on 3 November 1993.

== Administration ==
The district is divided into six sub-districts (tambon), which are further subdivided into 44 villages (muban). There are no municipal (thesaban) areas, and five tambon administrative organizations (TAOs).

No.	Name	Thai name	Villages	Pop.
1.	Nong Sung	หนองสูง	5	1,795
2.	Non Yang	โนนยาง	10	5,900
3.	Phu Wong	ภูวง	7	2,639
4.	Ban Pao	บ้านเป้า	6	3,723
5.	Nong Sung Tai	หนองสูงใต้	8	3,956
6.	Nong Sung Nuea	หนองสูงเหนือ	8	2,861
