= Na Khu district =

District of Thailand

Na Khu นาคู
- District
- District location in Kalasin province
- Coordinates: 16°45′25″N 104°00′30″E
- Country: Thailand
- Province: Kalasin
- Seat: Na Khu

Area
  - Total: 203.0925 km^{2} (78.4145 sq mi)

Population (2005)
  - Total: 31,510
  - Density: 211.2/km^{2} (547/sq mi)
- Time zone: UTC+7 (ICT)
- Postal code: 46250
- Geocode: 4616

Na Khu (Thai: นาคู, pronounced [nāː kʰūː]) is a district (amphoe) in the eastern part of Kalasin province, northeastern Thailand.

== Geography ==
Neighboring districts are (from the south clockwise): Khao Wong, Kuchinarai, and Huai Phueng of Kalasin Province; Phu Phan and Tao Ngoi of Sakon Nakhon province; and Dong Luang of Mukdahan province.

== History ==
The minor district (king amphoe) was created on 1 April 1995, when it was split off from Khao Wong district.

On 15 May 2007, all 81 minor districts were upgraded to full districts. With publication in the Royal Gazette on 24 August, the upgrade became official.

== Administration ==
The district is divided into five sub-districts (tambons), which are further subdivided into 54 villages (mubans). Na Khu is a township (thesaban tambon) which covers parts of tambon Na Khu. There are a further five tambon administrative organizations (TAO).

No.	Name	Thai name	Villages	Pop.
1.	Na Khu	นาคู	13	9,799
2.	Sai Na Wang	สายนาวัง	8	4,117
3.	Non Na Chan	โนนนาจาน	9	4,747
4.	Bo Kaeo	บ่อแก้ว	14	8,780
5.	Phu Laen Chang	ภูแล่นช้าง	10	4,067
