= Tao Ngoi district =

Tao Ngoi เต่างอย
- District
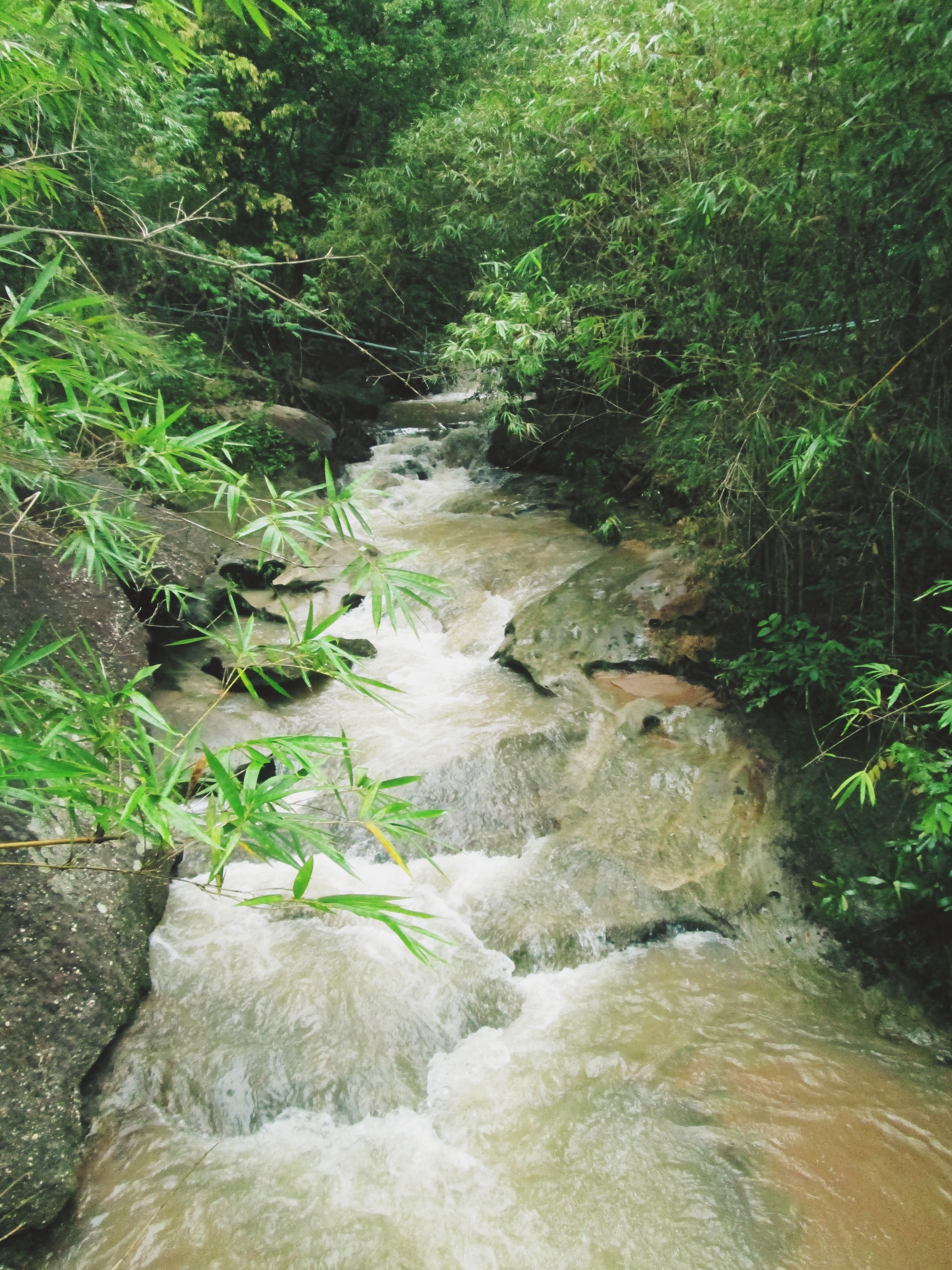
- Rapids of Kham Nam Sang Waterfall, Phu Pha Yon National Park

- District location in Sakon Nakhon province
- Coordinates: 16°57′N 104°09′E
- Country: Thailand
- Province: Sakon Nakhon
- Seat: Tao Ngoi

Area
  - Total: 328.0 km^{2} (126.6 sq mi)

Population (2005)
  - Total: 23,043
  - Density: 159/km^{2} (410/sq mi)
- Time zone: UTC+7 (ICT)
- Postal code: 47260
- Geocode: 4714

Tao Ngoi (Thai: เต่างอย, pronounced [tàw ŋɔ̄ːj]; Northeastern Thai: เต่างอย, pronounced [táw ŋɔ̂ːj]) is a district (amphoe) of Sakon Nakhon province, northeast Thailand.

== History ==
The minor district (king amphoe) was created on 1 September 1978, when the two tambons, Tao Ngoi and Bueng Thawai, were split off from Mueang Sakon Nakhon district. It was upgraded to a full district on 19 July 1991.

The district's name in the Isan language means 'floating turtle'. It is said that 400 years ago, the Thai people and Lao people were at war. When the Lao were defeated, they migrated south to the Pung River. Turtles, a symbol of fertility, were abundant there. Thus the settlement was named for their presence. A giant turtle statue named Phaya Tao Ngoi (พญาเต่างอย; lit: 'turtle lord') was erected in the park behind the district office. In 2017, the popular female luk thung singer Jintara Poonlarp released the song, "Tao Ngoi", bringing increased publicity to the story and the district.

== Geography ==
Neighboring districts are (from the west clockwise) Phu Phan, Mueang Sakon Nakhon and Khok Si Suphan of Sakon Nakhon Province, Na Kae of Nakhon Phanom province, Dong Luang of Mukdahan province, and Na Khu of Kalasin province.

== Administration ==
The district is divided into four sub-districts (tambons), which are further subdivided into 32 villages (mubans). There are no municipal (thesaban) areas, and a further four tambon administrative organizations.

No.	Name	Thai name	Villages	Pop.
1.	Tao Ngoi	เต่างอย	7	5,619
2.	Bueng Thawai	บึงทวาย	10	5,131
3.	Na Tan	นาตาล	7	5,363
4.	Chan Phen	จันทร์เพ็ญ	8	6,930

== Economy ==
Tao Ngoi is the center of tomato production and processing in Thailand. A "tomato belt" of some 30,000 rai are planted in the area. In 1982, the Doi Kham Food Products Co. built a food processing factory in the district. The factory buys 18,000-25,000 tonnes of tomatoes from farmers each year. The Tao Ngoi plant generated revenues of 150 million baht in 2017. Revenue is expected to grow to 200 million baht in 2018.
