= Si Songkhram district =

Si Songkhram ศรีสงคราม
- District
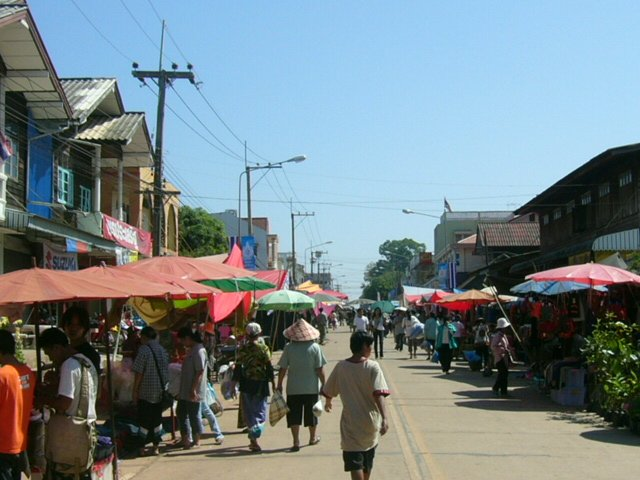
- Street market in Si Songkhram

- District location in Nakhon Phanom province
- Coordinates: 17°37′38″N 104°15′2″E
- Country: Thailand
- Province: Nakhon Phanom
- Seat: Si Songkhram

Area
  - Total: 671.317 km^{2} (259.197 sq mi)

Population (2005)
  - Total: 65,952
  - Density: 98.2/km^{2} (254/sq mi)
- Time zone: UTC+7 (ICT)
- Postal code: 48150
- Geocode: 4808

Si Songkhram (Thai: ศรีสงคราม, pronounced [sǐː sǒŋ.kʰrāːm]; Northeastern Thai: ศรีสงคราม, pronounced [sǐː sǒŋ.kʰâːm]) is a district (amphoe) in Nakhon Phanom province in northeast Thailand.

== Geography ==
Neighboring districts are (from the north clockwise): Na Thom, Ban Phaeng, Tha Uthen, Phon Sawan, and Na Wa of Nakhon Phanom Province, and Akat Amnuai of Sakon Nakhon province.

The district is named after its main river, the Songkhram River.

== History ==
The area was at first part of Tha Uthen district. On 1 April 1926, it was split off as the minor district (king amphoe) Akat Amnui (อากาศอำนวย), the present day Akat Amnui District in neighboring Sakon Nakhon was also originally controlled from Tha Uthen. The minor district consisted of the seven tambons: Na Wa, Ban Kha, Ban Siao, Sam Phong, Ban Waeng, Na Thom, and Ban Phaeng. The minor district was renamed Si Songkhram in 1939, and was upgraded to a full district on 10 March 1953.

== Administration ==
The district is divided into nine sub-districts (tambons), which are further subdivided into 106 villages (mubans). Si Songkhram itself has township (thesaban tambon) status and covers part of tambon Si Songkhram. There are a further nine tambon tambon administrative organization (TAO).

No.	Name	Thai name	Villages	Pop.
1.	Si Songkhram	ศรีสงคราม	10	8,120
2.	Na Duea	นาเดื่อ	11	6,889
3.	Ban Ueang	บ้านเอื้อง	15	10,738
4.	Sam Phong	สามผง	16	8,377
5.	Tha Bo Songkhram	ท่าบ่อสงคราม	7	4,875
6.	Ban Kha	บ้านข่า	13	6,959
7.	Na Kham	นาคำ	16	9,444
8.	Phon Sawang	โพนสว่าง	10	5,612
9.	Hat Phaeng	หาดแพง	8	4,938

== Economy ==
Si Songkhram is the largest Mekong and Songkhram River fish market in the Isan.
