= Mueang Nakhon Phanom district =

District of Thailand

Mueang Nakhon Phanom เมืองนครพนม
- District
- District location in Nakhon Phanom province
- Coordinates: 17°22′2″N 104°45′38″E
- Country: Thailand
- Province: Nakhon Phanom
- Seat: Nong Yat

Area
  - Total: 853.20 km^{2} (329.42 sq mi)

Population (2008)
  - Total: 141,997
  - Density: 122.7/km^{2} (318/sq mi)
- Time zone: UTC+7 (ICT)
- Postal code: 48000
- Geocode: 4801

Mueang Nakhon Phanom (Thai: เมืองนครพนม, pronounced [mɯ̄aŋ ná(ʔ).kʰɔ̄ːn pʰā.nōm]; Northeastern Thai: เมืองนครพนม, pronounced [mɯ̂aŋ nà(ʔ).kʰɔ̂ːn pʰā.nôm]) is the capital district (amphoe mueang) of Nakhon Phanom province, northeastern Thailand.

== Geography ==
Neighboring districts are (from the south clockwise): That Phanom, Renu Nakhon of Nakhon Phanom Province; Kusuman of Sakon Nakhon province; Pla Pak and Tha Uthen of Nakhon Phanom Province. To the east across the Mekong River is the Laotian province Khammouan.

== History ==
In 1917 the district name was changed from Mueang to Nong Buek (หนองบึก). In 1938 it was renamed Mueang Nakhon Phanom.

== Economy ==
Khok Phu Kratae and Phai Lom villages in At Samat Subdistrict will be the site of a special economic zone (SEZ). As many as 400 families are to be evicted in the course of the project. Gen Prayut Chan-o-cha, head of the junta's National Council for Peace and Order (NCPO) and prime minister, in May 2015 invoked his authority under Section 44 of the Interim Charter to announce NCPO Order No. 17/2015. The order mandates turning large areas in Tak, Mukdahan, Nong Khai, Sa Kaeo, and Trat provinces into special economic zones (SEZs), where deregulation of industry and tax cuts are offered to lure investors. In addition to the pilot SEZ projects in these five provinces, more land in five other provinces, Chiang Rai, Nakhon Phanom, Kanchanaburi, Songkhla, and Narathiwat, are to be expropriated and cleared for SEZs.

== Administration ==
The district is divided into 15 sub-districts (tambons), which are further subdivided into 169 villages (mubans). The town (thesaban mueang) Nakhon Phanom covers tambon Nai Mueang and Nong Saeng and parts of tambons At Samat and Nong Yat. There are a further 13 tambon administrative organizations (TAO).

No.	Name	Thai	Villages	Pop.
1.	Nai Mueang	ในเมือง	-	16,771
2.	Nong Saeng	หนองแสง	-	4,691
3.	Na Sai	นาทราย	13	5,784
4.	Na Rat Khwai	นาราชควาย	9	7,277
5.	Kurukhu	กุรุคุ	13	7,938
6.	Ban Phueng	บ้านผึ้ง	23	15,787
7.	At Samat	อาจสามารถ	11	9,771
8.	Kham Thao	ขามเฒ่า	11	8,721
9.	Ban Klang	บ้านกลาง	13	8,554
10.	Tha Kho	ท่าค้อ	14	8,813
11.	Kham Toei	คำเตย	18	12,135
12.	Nong Yat	หนองญาติ	13	14,372
13.	Dong Khwang	ดงขวาง	11	6,500
14.	Wang Ta Mua	วังตามัว	11	8,302
15.	Pho Tak	โพธิ์ตาก	9	6,581
