= Wat Phra That Phanom =

Thai Buddhist Temple in Southern part of Nakhon Phanom, Thailand

Coordinates: 16°56′36.24″N 104°43′33.59″E

- วัดพระธาตุพนม
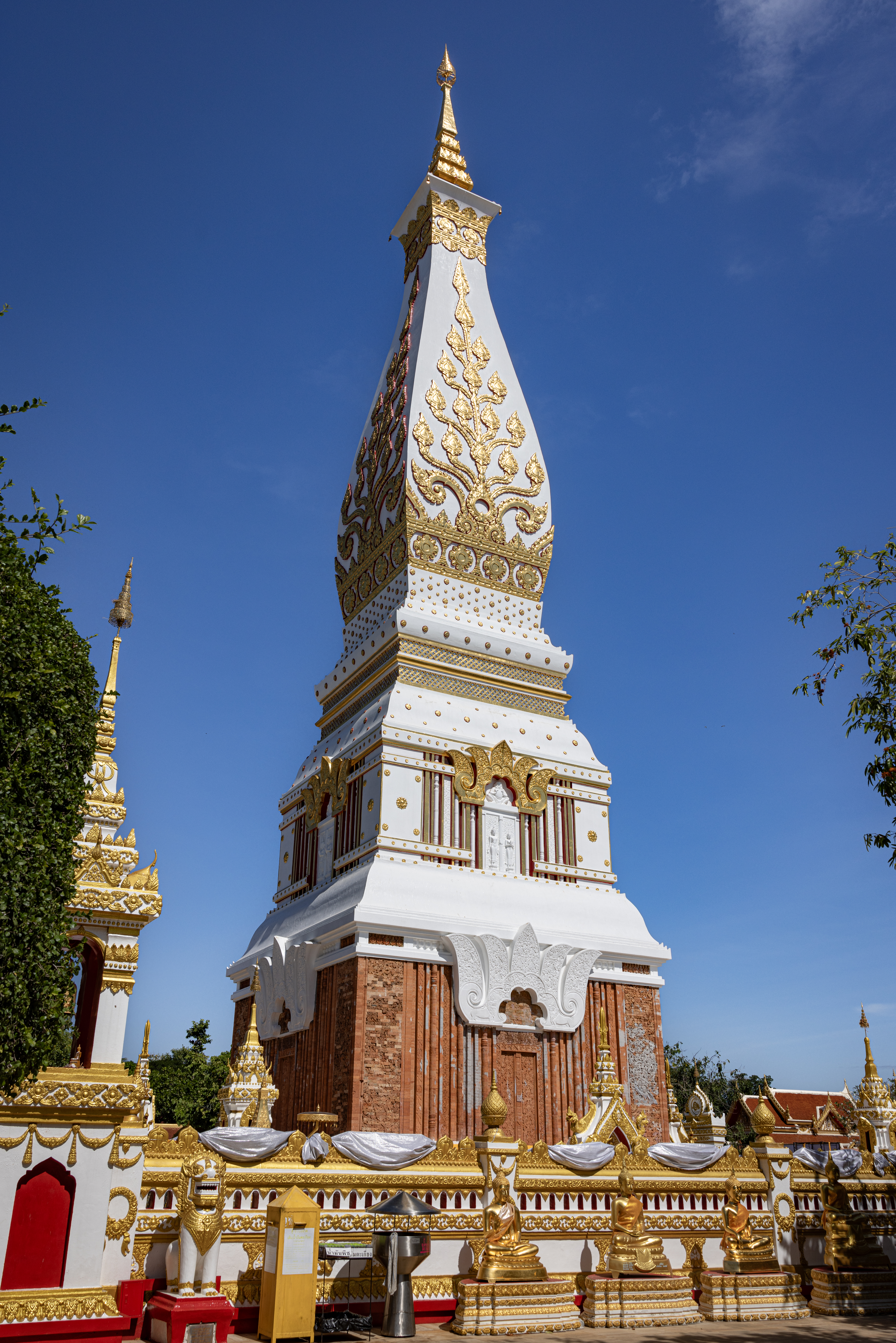
- Main Pagoda

Religion
- Affiliation: Theravada Buddhism

Location
- Location: That Phanom District, Nakhon Phanom Province, Thailand
- Interactive map of Wat Phra That Phanom

Wat Phra That Phanom (Thai: วัดพระธาตุพนม) is a Buddhist temple in the That Phanom District in the south of Nakhon Phanom Province, all within the Isan region of Thailand near the Lao border. According to local legend, the temple contains in the pagoda the Phra Uranghathat (พระอุรังคธาตุ)/Phra Ura (พระอุระ)/Buddha's breast bones. As such, it is one of the most important structures for Theravada Buddhists and the most important Buddhist site in the province, with an annual week-long festival being held in the town of That Phanom to honour the temple. The festival attracts thousands of people who make pilgrimages to the shrine. In Thai folk Buddhism, Wat Phra That Phanom is a popular pilgrimage destination for those born in the year of the Monkey.

The temple contains a number of paintings illustrating traditional Thai proverbs.

== History ==
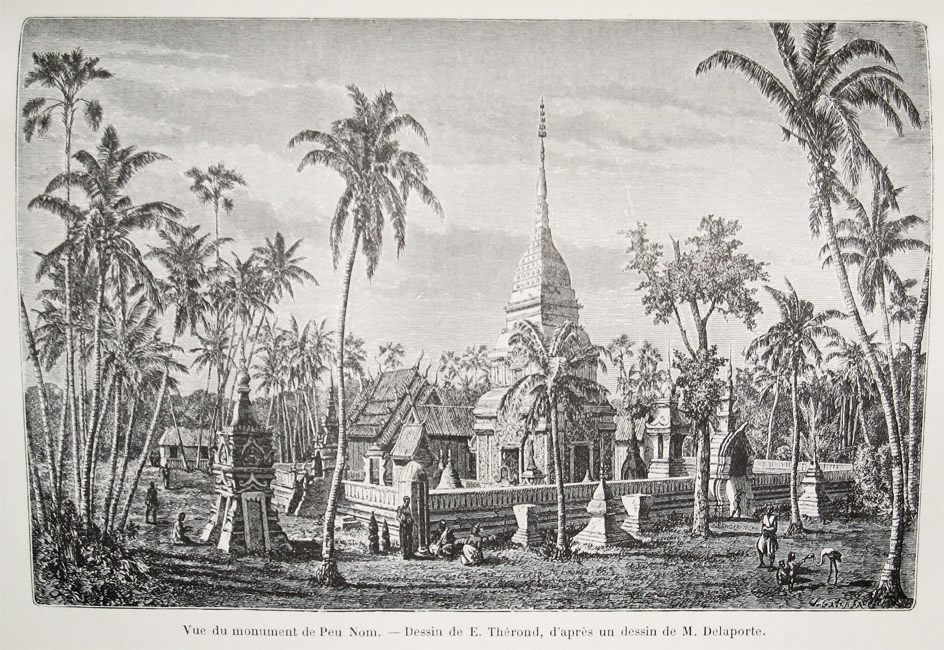
Drawing of Phra That Phanom by Louis Marie Joseph Delaporte, 1870-1875

The That Phanom Chronicle documented that the Phra That Phanom stupa was first constructed 8 years after the Buddha's passing by the five kings of the Mon kingdom, known as Sri Gotupura. However, archaeological findings suggest that the earliest structure found dates back to the 7th or 8th century CE.

According to local legend, the Buddha told Mahakasyapa, one of his principal disciples, that once he died, Mahakasyapa was to bring his breast bones to 'Phu Kampra to allow Buddhism to continue on. Then in 525 B.C, Mahakasyapa then decided on constructing a temple on Phu Kampra. Joined by 500 Arhats and 5 Phrayas, they built the Phra That Phanom stupa primarily from clay and once completed, the Buddha's breastbones were brought over from India and placed inside.

The pagoda is believed to have been built before the 1100s with its original Khmer design. However years of being part Lao kingdoms led to several renovations which created the current pagoda in a Lao style. In 1690, the pagoda was restored and raised to about 47 meters, and then by a further 10 meters in 1940.

In 1935, the complex was registered as an ancient monument for preservation by the Fine Arts Department of Thailand.

In March 1975, an earthquake caused cracks to appear. On 11 August 1975 at 7:38 p.m, the entire pagoda collapsed due to several days of heavy rain. It was rebuilt with funds raised by public subscription and from the Royal Thai Government, which was completed on 23 March 1979. Then king Bhumibol and Queen Sirikit along with other royal members visited the site when the Buddha's relics were re-installed. Many valuables were placed inside during its rebuilding and a 110-kilogram gold spire was added on top of the pagoda. Buddhists from Laos also participated, placing many valuable items from Vientiane within, such as Lan Xang style golden seven-tiered umbrella. To help protect the temple,

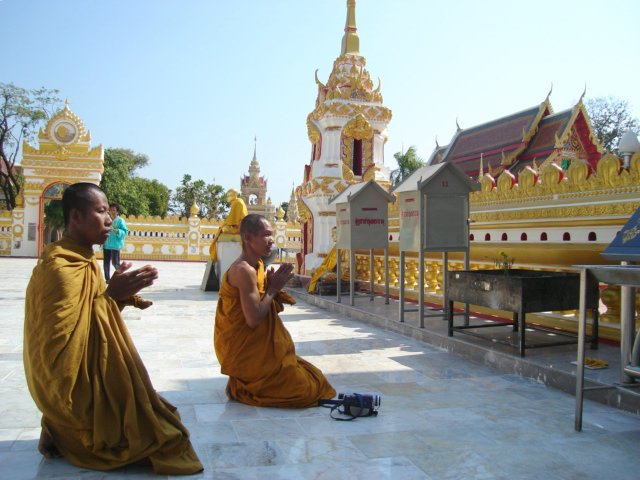
Buddhist Monks in the complex

around 4 hectares around the front part were included into the register to further help preserve the site. This is called the 'Buddha Area'.

== Architecture ==
The 53-meters tall square pagoda was originally made in a Khmer style when it was first created before the 12th century. However renovations when it was under Lao control led to it having its current Lao pagoda design. The stupa's unique architectural style combines Dvaravati, Khmer, and Cham art. The architectural style of the temple inspired other temple designs in the area.

== See also ==
- Phra Pathom Chedi
- Phra Mahathat Kaen Nakhon
- Phra That Kham Kaen
- Wat Pa Thama Uthayan
- Wat Thung Setthi
- Wat Photharam, Maha Sarakham
- Phra That Choeng Chum
