= Tha Uthen district =

Tha Uthen ท่าอุเทน
- Amphoe
- Amphoe location in Nakhon Phanom province
- Coordinates: 17°33′25″N 104°36′45″E
- Country: Thailand
- Province: Nakhon Phanom
- Seat: Non Tan

Area
  - Total: 468.0 km^{2} (180.7 sq mi)

Population (2015)
  - Total: 59,349
  - Density: 122.7/km^{2} (318/sq mi)
- Time zone: UTC+7 (ICT)
- Postal code: 48120
- Geocode: 4803

Tha Uthen (Thai: ท่าอุเทน, pronounced [tʰâː ʔù.tʰēːn]; Northeastern Thai: ท่าอุเทน, pronounced [tʰāː ʔǔ.tʰêːn]) is a district (amphoe) of Nakhon Phanom province, northeastern Thailand.

== Geography ==
Neighboring districts are (from the south clockwise) Mueang Nakhon Phanom, Phon Sawan, Si Songkhram, and Ban Phaeng of Nakhon Phanom Province. To the east across the Mekong river is the Laotian province Khammouan.

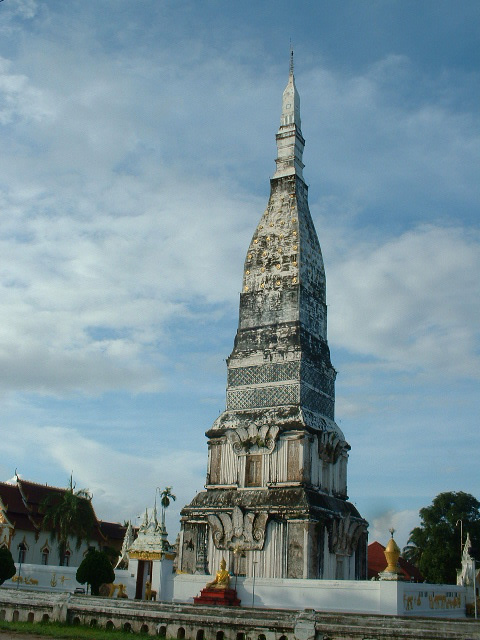
Phra That Tha Uthen, on the right Mekong River bank, Amphoe Tha Uthen

== History ==
The original location of Muang Tha Uthen was at present-day tambon Chaiburi, then named Chai Rit Uttaburi (ไชยฤทธิ์อุตตบุรี). It was founded in 1808 by the Tai Nyo leader Thao Mo and his wife, Sunantha, who moved people from Muang Hongsavadi of present-day Laos. Thao Mo was then awarded with the title Phraya Hongsawadi.

In 1814 the temple (Wat) Sri Sunanthamaharam was built, which later was called Wat Traiphum.

In 1833, Phraya Maha Ammat, a military leader moved people from the current Lao side of Mekong River and settled them on the current Thai side of the river. Thao Prathum was the first leader of Tha Uthen city and received the title Phra Sri Worasan.

After Phra Sri Worasan died in 1866, Phra Chamroenpholrop was promoted to be the leader of the city.

In 1870 King Mongkut assigned his son, Phra Sri Worarat, to be the leader of Tha Uthen. He died in 1899. Later the Ministry of Interior decided that the city should no longer have a royal family member as its leader, but be led by an assigned governor.

In 1907 the muang was converted into a district. Chanthima Pholdecha became the first district officer.

== Administration ==
=== Central administration ===
Tha Uthen is divided into nine sub-districts (tambon), which are further subdivided into 111 administrative villages (Muban).

No.	Name	Thai	Villages	Pop.
1.	Tha Uthen	ท่าอุเทน	7	4,923
2.	Non Tan	โนนตาล	15	7,506
3.	Tha Champa	ท่าจำปา	16	8,900
4.	Chaiburi	ไชยบุรี	17	8,460
5.	Phanom	พนอม	11	5,293
6.	Phathai	พะทาย	10	4,960
11.	Woen Phrabat	เวินพระบาท	10	6,166
12.	Ram Rat	รามราช	17	8,772
14.	Nong Thao	หนองเทา	8	4,369

Missing numbers are tambon which now form Phon Sawan district.

=== Local administration ===
There are two sub-district municipalities (thesaban tambon) in the district:

- Tha Uthen (Thai: เทศบาลตำบลท่าอุเทน) consisting of sub-district Tha Uthen.
- Woen Phrabat (Thai: เทศบาลตำบลเวินพระบาท) consisting of sub-district Woen Phrabat.

There are seven subdistrict administrative organizations (SAO) in the district:

- Non Tan (Thai: องค์การบริหารส่วนตำบลโนนตาล) consisting of sub-district Non Tan.
- Tha Champa (Thai: องค์การบริหารส่วนตำบลท่าจำปา) consisting of sub-district Tha Champa.
- Chaiburi (Thai: องค์การบริหารส่วนตำบลไชยบุรี) consisting of sub-district Chaiburi.
- Phanom (Thai: องค์การบริหารส่วนตำบลพนอม) consisting of sub-district Phanom.
- Phathai (Thai: องค์การบริหารส่วนตำบลพะทาย) consisting of sub-district Phathai.
- Ram Rat (Thai: องค์การบริหารส่วนตำบลรามราช) consisting of sub-district Ram Rat.
- Nong Thao (Thai: องค์การบริหารส่วนตำบลหนองเทา) consisting of sub-district Nong Thao.
