= Khao Wong district =

District of Thailand

Khao Wong เขาวง
- District
- District location in Kalasin province
- Coordinates: 16°42′0″N 104°5′24″E
- Country: Thailand
- Province: Kalasin
- Seat: Khum Kao

Area
  - Total: 205.1 km^{2} (79.2 sq mi)

Population (2005)
  - Total: 35,130
  - Density: 171.3/km^{2} (444/sq mi)
- Time zone: UTC+7 (ICT)
- Postal code: 46160
- Geocode: 4606

Khao Wong (Thai: เขาวง, pronounced [kʰǎw wōŋ]) is a district (amphoe) in the eastern part of Kalasin province, northeastern Thailand.

== Geography ==
Neighboring districts are (from the south clockwise) Kuchinarai and Na Khu of Kalasin Province, Dong Luang and Khamcha-i of Mukdahan province.

== History ==
The minor district (king amphoe) was created on 1 June 1969, when the five tambons Khum Kao, Song Plueai, Na Khu, Phu Laen Chang, and Nong Phue were split off from Kuchinarai district. It was upgraded to a full district on 1 April 1974.

== Administration ==
The district is divided into six subdistricts (tambons), which are further subdivided into 59 villages (mubans). Kut Sim is a township (thesaban tambon) which covers parts of tambons Khum Kao, Kut Sim Khum Mai, and tambon Kut Pla Khao. There are a further five tambon administrative organizations (TAO).

No.	Name	Thai name	Villages	Pop.
1.	Khum Kao	คุ้มเก่า	13	9,137
2.	Song Plueai	สงเปลือย	12	7,271
3.	Nong Phue	หนองผือ	10	5,884
6.	Kut Sim Khum Mai	กุดสิมคุ้มใหม่	12	6,808
8.	Saphang Thong	สระพังทอง	7	2,924
11.	Kut Pla Khao	กุดปลาค้าว	5	3,106

Missing numbers are tambons which now form Na Khu District.
