= Nakhon Phanom province =

Coordinates: 17°24′29″N 104°46′56″E

Nakhon Phanom นครพนม
- Province
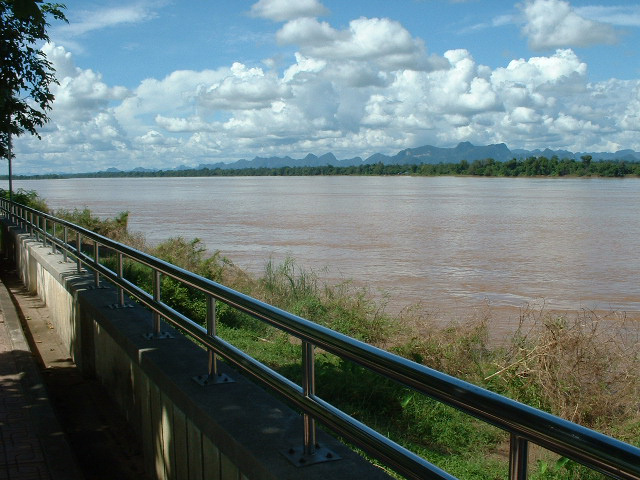
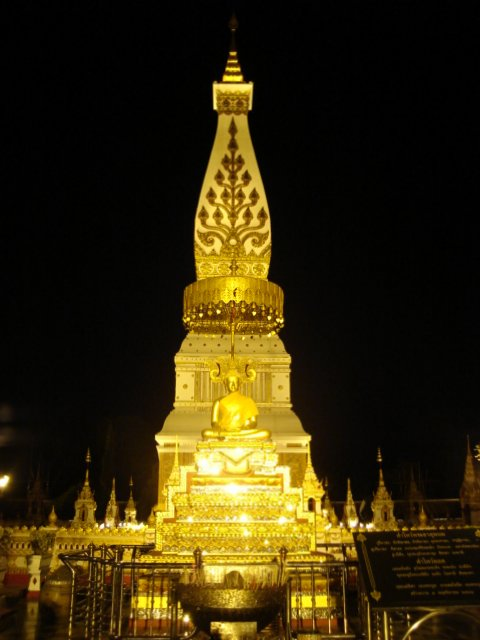
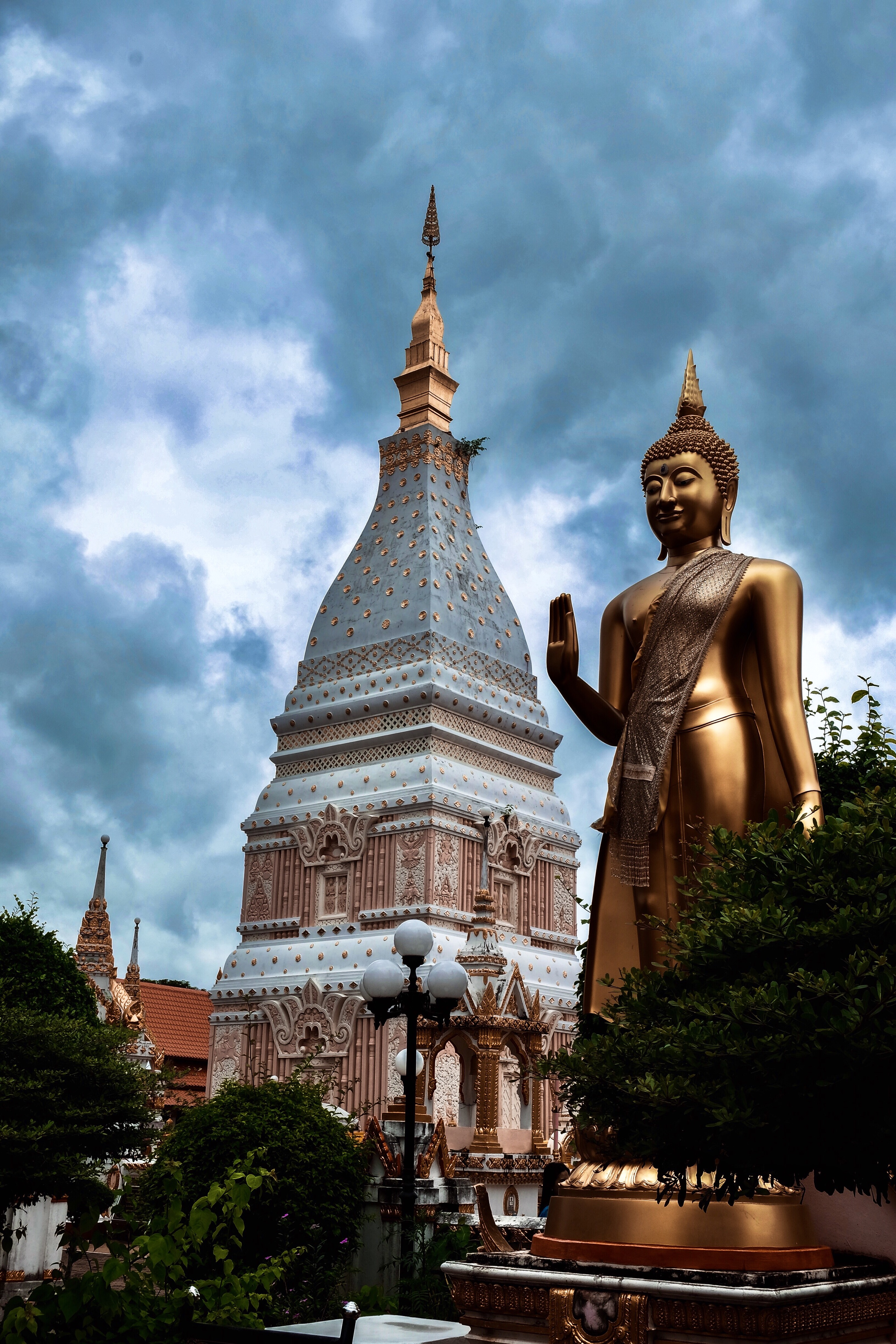
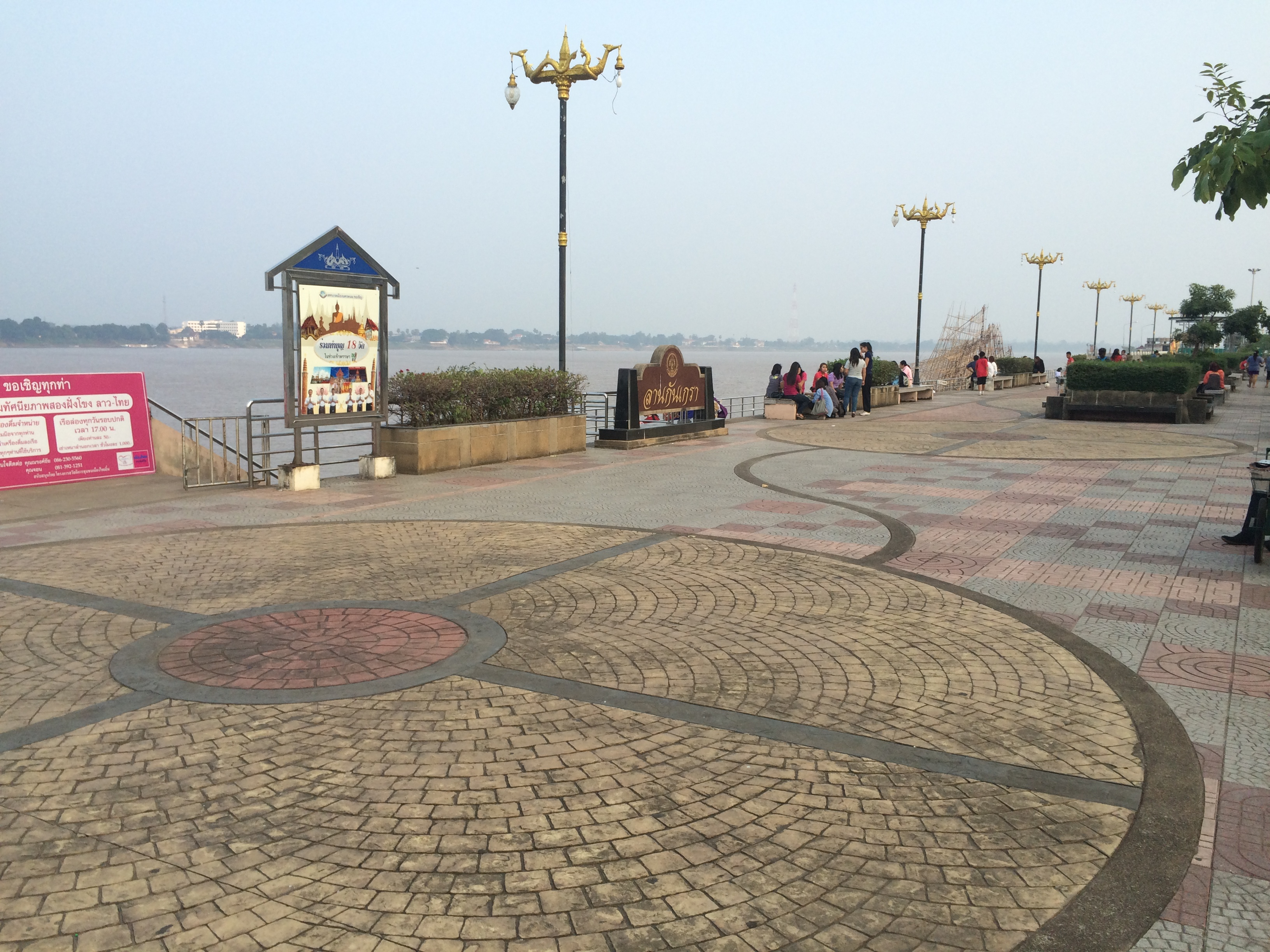
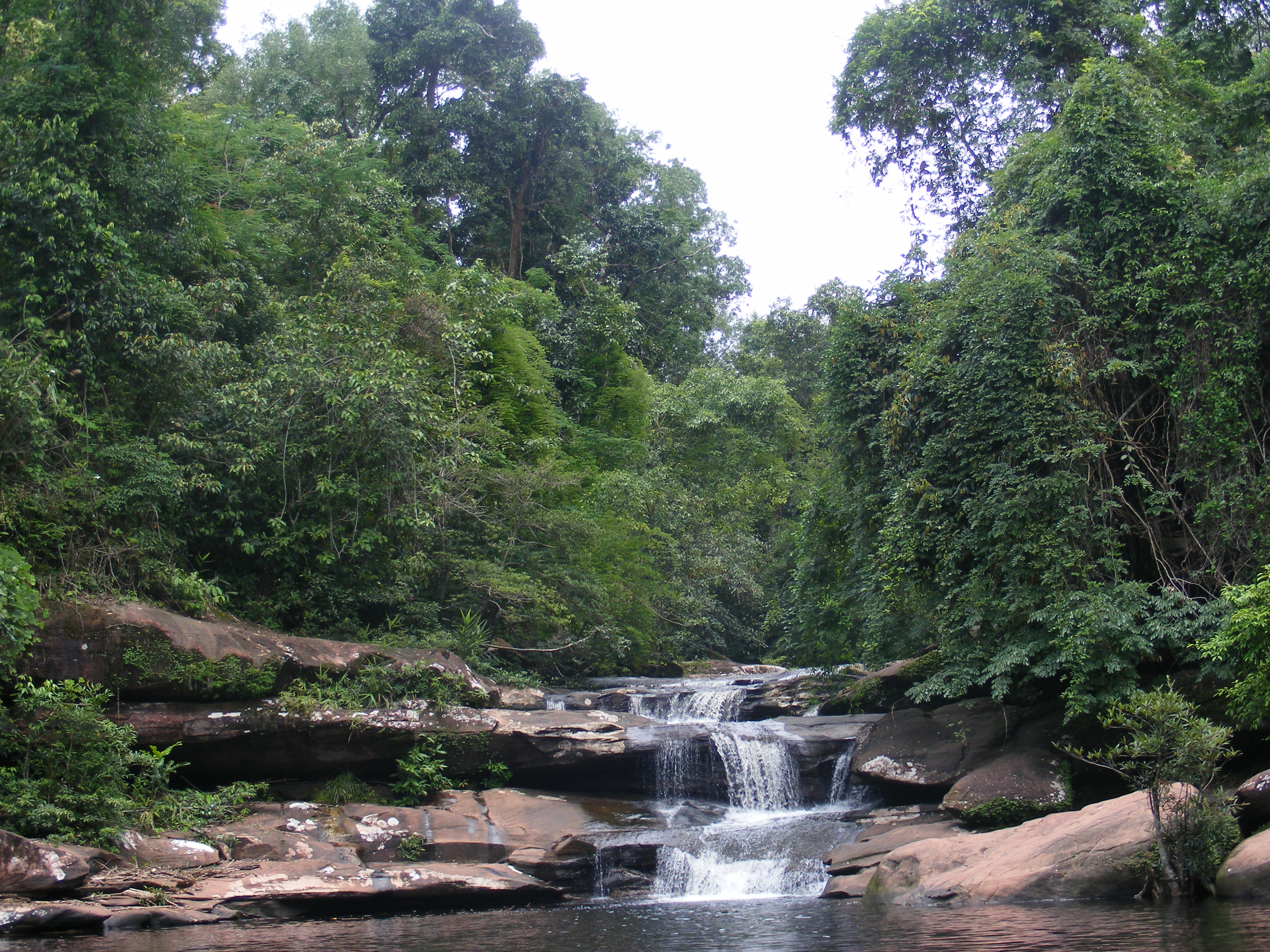
- From left to right, top to bottom: Mekong River, Nakhon Phanom province, opposite Khammouan, Laos; Chedi of Phra That Phanom at night; Chedi of Phra That Renu; Promenade along Mekong; Waterfall in Si Songkhram; Ho Chi Minh Memorial House, Ban Nachok

- Flag Seal
- Mottoes: พระธาตุพนมค่าล้ำ วัฒนธรรมหลากหลาย เรณูผู้ไท เรือไฟโสภา งามตาฝั่งโขง ("Sacred Phra That Phanom. Variety of cultures. Phu Thai peoples of Renu. Ruea Fai festival. Beautiful Mekong riverfront.")
- Map of Thailand highlighting Nakhon Phanom province
- Country: Thailand
- Capital: Nakhon Phanom town

Government
  - Governor: Pratya Unphetwarakon
  - PAO Chief Executive: Anuchit Hongsadee

Area
  - Total: 5,637 km^{2} (2,176 sq mi)
  - Rank: 38th

Population (2024)
  - Total: ▲710,740
  - Rank: 36th
  - Density: 126/km^{2} (330/sq mi)
  - Rank: 36th

Human Achievement Index
  - HAI (2022): 0.6486 "somewhat high" Ranked 27th

GDP
  - Total: baht 43 billion (US$1.4 billion) (2019)
- Time zone: UTC+7 (ICT)
- Postal code: 48xx
- Calling code: 042
- ISO 3166 code: TH-48
- Website: nakhonphanom.go.th

Nakhon Phanom province (Thai: นครพนม, pronounced [ná(ʔ).kʰɔ̄ːn pʰā.nōm], lit. 'Mountain City'; Northeastern Thai: นครพนม, pronounced [nà(ʔ).kʰɔ᷇ːn pʰā.no᷇m]) is one of Thailand's seventy-six provinces (changwat) and lies in upper northeastern Thailand, also called Isan. Directly adjacent provinces are, from the south clockwise, Mukdahan, Sakon Nakhon, and Bueng Kan. To the northeast it borders Khammouan of Laos. The area was once the polity of Si Khottabun, whose name survives in chronicle and in the Ayutthaya Palace Law.

== Geography ==
The province, in the Mekong River valley, is mostly plains. The northern part of the province has a more upland, forest-covered character. The main river in the northern part is the Songkhram River with the smaller Oun River. The southern part is flatter with the Kum River as its only notable watercourse. The provincial capital, the city of Nakhon Phanom, is on the banks of the Mekong. The total forest area is 789 km^{2} (305 sq mi) or 14 percent of provincial area.

=== National parks ===
There are two national parks, along with five other national parks, make up region 10 (Udon Thani) of Thailand's protected areas. (Visitors in fiscal year 2024)

Phu Pha Yon National Park	829 km^{2} (320 sq mi)	(19,061)
Phu Langka National Park	50 km^{2} (19 sq mi)	(245,262)

== History ==
The name Nakhon Phanom, meaning 'city of mountains', was given to the city by King Rama I. There are no mountains within Nakhon Phanom itself, the limestone mountains being concentrated in the city of Thakhek in Laos on the other side of the Mekong River. Nakhon Phanom is more accurately described as a city where mountains can be seen.

During the 12th century, the area was a kingdom called the Kingdom of Sikhottaboon, but the kingdom went into decline and fell under Khmer rule in the 1500s. The Urangkhathat chronicle calls it Si Khotamo, Si Khotrabun or Si Khotrabong. Mueang Khotrabong appears in the Ayutthaya Palace Law among the towns sending gold and silver flowers to the capital, which Sujit Wongthes reads as showing that the polity was real and had by then declined to a town. In 1766, the city of Marukhanakhon was moved across the Mekong river to its present site on the Thai side. The town was again moved to its present site and was called Nakhon Buri Ratchathani until renamed by King Rama I to its present name.

The area had been long settled by Lao people and belonged to the Lan Xang Kingdom. After it came under the control of the Kingdom of Ayutthaya, the population remained predominantly Lao speaking. At first it was known as Si Khottrabun, and during the reign of King Rama I was called Marukkhanakhon.

During the Vietnam War Nakhon Phanom saw fighting between North Vietnamese insurgents and US forces. During the 1960s, 73 of the 131 sub-district (tambons) were allegedly infiltrated by the Vietnamese and Lao communists, and the province was known as the "heartland of insurgency". US and Thai forces established a base at Nakhon Phanom, where the Thai military hosted the 56th Air Commando Wing. The wing conducted special operations against the Ho Chi Minh Trail in Laos and counter-insurgency operations against Thai communist forces, and carried out search and rescue missions, mainly inside Laos and North Vietnam.

On 7 August 1965, an ethnic Phu Thai village in the province, made headlines when Thailand's first-ever physical confrontation between communist fighters and Thai security forces occurred. Eight communist villagers were involved, one of whom was shot dead during the incident after the town was surrounded by state forces.

Between 1967 and 1971, most of the communist insurgents were defeated. Towards the end of the Vietnam War, US forces moved their Indochinese military operations to Nakhon Phanom.

Vietnamese communist leader Ho Chi Minh had resided from 1928 and 1931 in Ban Nachok, a small village on the road between what is now the airbase and Nakhon Phanom. His former home and a museum are open to the public.

In 2023, a Lao 56-year-old man named Thao Bua Pa was arrested in a major bust for having 1,012,000 tablets of methamphetamine pills. He claimed he had lost his employment and was going to save the money he made to look after his pregnant wife.

== Symbols ==
The provincial seal shows the pagoda of Phra That Phanom in That Phanom District. Originally constructed around 535 BCE in Khmer-style, it collapsed in 1675 and was rebuilt in Lao-style. The provincial tree, as well as flower, is Fagraea fragrans. The provincial aquatic life is basa fish (Pangasius bocourti) (known as "pla yang" or "pla poh" in Thai).

The provincial slogan is "The city of the revered Phrathat Phanom, cultural diversity, beautiful Phutai people, brilliant illuminated boat procession and picturesque Mekong River".

== Culture ==
Important festivals in the province include the traditional dances of the Phu Thai ethnic group held in May and June every year. The Phra That Phanom temple fair is held every February, when many locals visit the temple to pay homage. At the end of the Buddhist Lent in October or November, an illuminated boat procession takes place. The event is locally known as Lai ruea fai (ไหลเรือไฟ), "floating a fire boat".

Late each year Si Songkhram District, the largest fish trading centre of the Mekong and Songkhram River Basin in Isan, holds a Fish Festival. It features a parade of giant robots of various fish species found in the Mekong Basin. These robots are made from local materials based on local wisdom. The robots are 10 m (32.8 ft) long and 4 m (13.1 ft)–5 m (16.4 ft) high. This festival is held to show the richness of local aquatic resources and to raise awareness of the conservation of nature and fish species.

The cuisine is similar to that of Laos as the Lao make up the ethnic and cultural majority through centuries of Laotian rule. Padaek or Pla ra, fermented, preserved fish, originally comes from the Si Songkhram area is now popular throughout Thailand.

Traditional products in the province include hand-woven fabric, made from silk or cotton. Renu Nakhon, That Phanom, and Si Songkhram Districts are the centers of this industry. Also hand-made khene instruments are made in the province.

== Economy ==
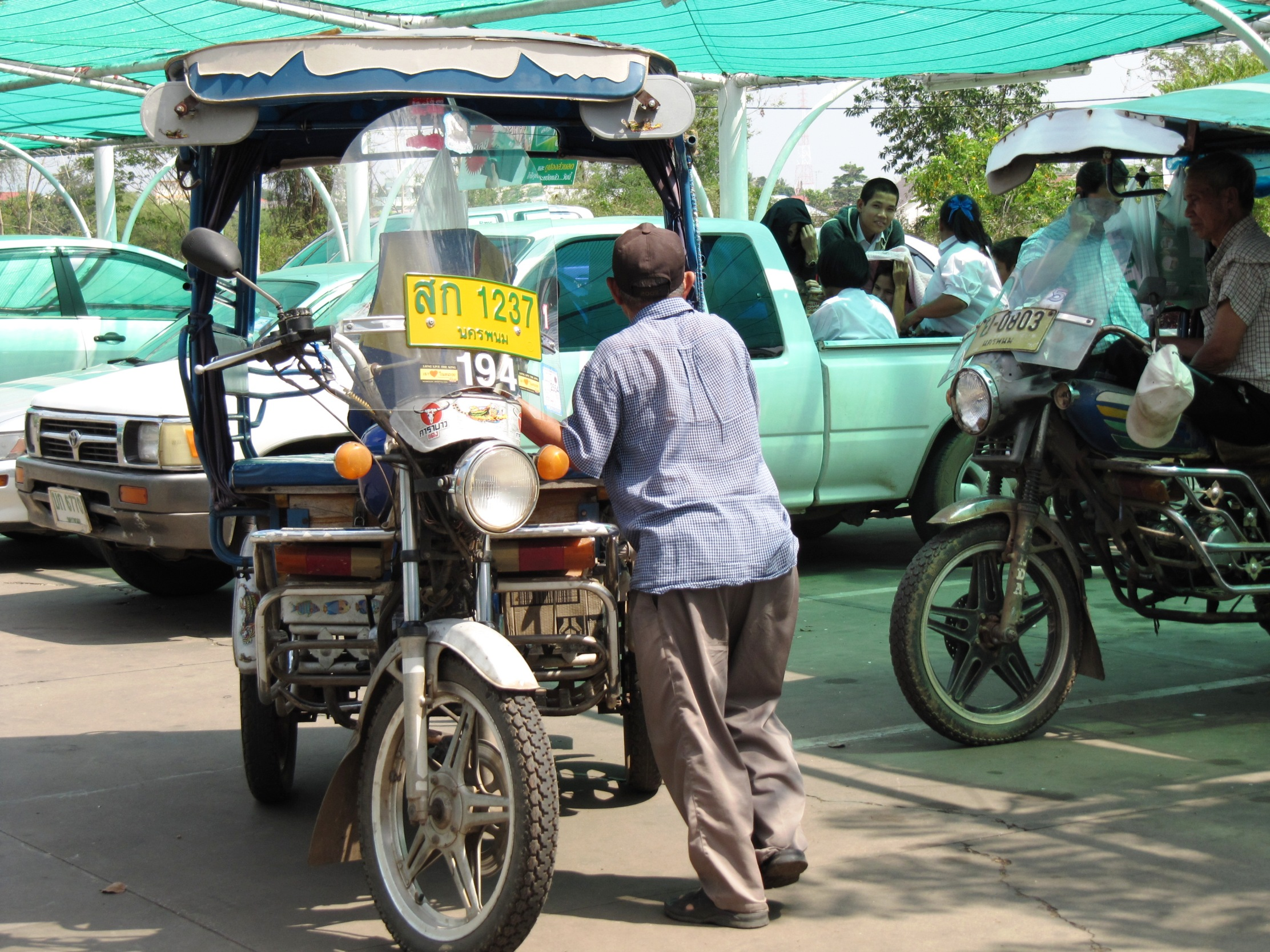
Isan tuk-tuk drivers awaiting passengers in Nakhon Phanom.

=== Special Economic Zone ===
As of 2019, a commercial mixed-use project with a hotel, sports complex, healthcare and trade exhibition center, respectively, and other facilities is being constructed on a 1,335 rai site near the third Thai-Lao Friendship Bridge and Nakhon Phanom checkpoint. It is one of ten special economic zones (SEZ) to be built throughout the country.

=== Tourism ===
The province derives little income from tourism. According to government officials, roughly 1.2 million tourists visited in 2017, of which only 10 percent of them were foreigners. The province projects tourist arrivals to reach more than 1.5 million in 2018.

== Administrative divisions ==
Map of 12 districts

=== Provincial government ===
The province is divided into 12 districts (amphoes). The districts are further divided into 97 subdistricts (tambons) and 1,040 villages (mubans).

1. Mueang Nakhon Phanom
2. Pla Pak
3. Tha Uthen
4. Ban Phaeng
5. That Phanom
6. Renu Nakhon
7. Na Kae
8. Si Songkhram
9. Na Wa
10. Phon Sawan
11. Na Thom
12. Wang Yang

=== Local government ===
As of 26 November 2019 there are: one Nakhon Phanom Provincial Administration Organisation (ongkan borihan suan changwat) and 22 municipal (thesaban) areas in the province. Nakhon Phanom has town (thesaban mueang) status. Further 21 subdistrict municipalities (thesaban tambon). The non-municipal areas are administered by 81 Subdistrict Administrative Organisations - SAO (ongkan borihan suan tambon).

== Education ==
The town is home to Nakhon Phanom University, formed in 2005 by the merger of several local schools including the former Nakhon Phanom Rajabhat University.

== Transport ==
=== Roads ===
Highway 212 runs from Nong Khai along the Mekong River through Nakhon Phanom to Mukdahan, and then south to Ubon Ratchathani. Highway 22 leads west through Sakon Nakhon to Udon Thani.

=== Air ===
Nakhon Phanom is served by Nakhon Phanom Airport, located four kilometers west of town.

== Human achievement index 2022 ==
Health	Education	Employment	Income
19	62	69	66
Housing	Family	Transport	Participation
16	7	32	28
Province Nakhon Phanom, with an HAI 2022 value of 0.6486 is "somewhat high", occupies place 27 in the ranking.

Since 2003, United Nations Development Programme (UNDP) in Thailand has tracked progress on human development at sub-national level using the Human achievement index (HAI), a composite index covering all the eight key areas of human development. National Economic and Social Development Board (NESDB) has taken over this task since 2017.

Rank	Classification
1–13	"High"
14–29	"Somewhat high"
30–45	"Average"
46–61	"Somewhat low"
62–77	"Low"

Map with provinces and HAI 2022 rankings
