= List of tambon in Thailand (N–O) =

This is a list of tambon (sub-districts) in Thailand, beginning with the letters N and O. This information is liable to change due to border changes or re-allocation of Tambons. Missing Tambon numbers show where the number is either not used or the Tambon has been transferred to a different Amphoe.

Tambon	ตำบล	Amphoe	อำเภอ	Changwat	จังหวัด	Region
Na An	นาอาน	Mueang Loei	เมืองเลย	Loei	เลย	North-East
Na Bin La	นาบินหลา	Mueang Trang	เมืองตรัง	Trang	ตรัง	South
Na Bo Kham	นาบ่อคำ	Mueang Kamphaeng Phet	เมืองกำแพงเพชร	Kamphaeng Phet	กำแพงเพชร	Central
Na Bon	นาบอน	Na Bon	นาบอน	Nakhon Si Thammarat	นครศรีธรรมราช	South
Na Bon	นาบอน	Kham Muang	คำม่วง	Kalasin	กาฬสินธุ์	North-East
Na Bot	นาโบสถ์	Wang Chao	วังเจ้า	Tak	ตาก	West
Na Bua	นาบัว	Mueang Surin	เมืองสุรินทร์	Surin	สุรินทร์	North-East
Na Bua	นาบัว	Nakhon Thai	นครไทย	Phitsanulok	พิษณุโลก	Central
Na Bua	นาบัว	Phen	เพ็ญ	Udon Thani	อุดรธานี	North-East
Na Cha-ang	นาชะอัง	Mueang Chumphon	เมืองชุมพร	Chumphon	ชุมพร	South
Na Chak	นาจักร	Mueang Phrae	เมืองแพร่	Phrae	แพร่	North
Na Chaliang	นาเฉลียง	Nong Phai	หนองไผ่	Phetchabun	เพชรบูรณ์	Central
Na Chaluai	นาจะหลวย	Na Chaluai	นาจะหลวย	Ubon Ratchathani	อุบลราชธานี	North-East
Na Champa	นาจำปา	Don Chan	ดอนจาน	Kalasin	กาฬสินธุ์	North-East
Na Chan	นาจาน	Si Chomphu	สีชมพู	Khon Kaen	ขอนแก่น	North-East
Na Chan	นาจารย์	Mueang Kalasin	เมืองกาฬสินธุ์	Kalasin	กาฬสินธุ์	North-East
Na Charoen	นาเจริญ	Det Udom	เดชอุดม	Ubon Ratchathani	อุบลราชธานี	North-East
Na Chik	นาจิก	Mueang Amnat Charoen	เมืองอำนาจเจริญ	Amnat Charoen	อำนาจเจริญ	North-East
Na Choeng Khiri	นาเชิงคีรี	Khiri Mat	คีรีมาศ	Sukhothai	สุโขทัย	Central
Na Chom Thian	นาจอมเทียน	Sattahip	สัตหีบ	Chonburi	ชลบุรี	East
Na Chong	นาโฉง	Mueang Saraburi	เมืองสระบุรี	Saraburi	สระบุรี	Central
Na Chueak	นาเชือก	Na Chueak	นาเชือก	Maha Sarakham	มหาสารคาม	North-East
Na Chueak	นาเชือก	Yang Talat	ยางตลาด	Kalasin	กาฬสินธุ์	North-East
Na Chum Het	นาชุมเห็ด	Yan Ta Khao	ย่านตาขาว	Trang	ตรัง	South
Na Chum Saeng	นาชุมแสง	Thung Fon	ทุ่งฝน	Udon Thani	อุดรธานี	North-East
Na Chum Saeng	นาชุมแสง	Phu Wiang	ภูเวียง	Khon Kaen	ขอนแก่น	North-East
Na Dan	นาด่าน	Suwannakhuha	สุวรรณคูหา	Nong Bua Lamphu	หนองบัวลำภู	North-East
Na Di	นาดี	Na Di	นาดี	Prachin Buri	ปราจีนบุรี	East
Na Di	นาดี	Mueang Udon Thani	เมืองอุดรธานี	Udon Thani	อุดรธานี	North-East
Na Di	นาดี	Yang Talat	ยางตลาด	Kalasin	กาฬสินธุ์	North-East
Na Di	นาดี	Na Yia	นาเยีย	Ubon Ratchathani	อุบลราชธานี	North-East
Na Di	นาดี	Fao Rai	เฝ้าไร่	Nong Khai	หนองคาย	North-East
Na Di	นาดี	Nong Saeng	หนองแสง	Udon Thani	อุดรธานี	North-East
Na Di	นาดี	Suwannakhuha	สุวรรณคูหา	Nong Bua Lamphu	หนองบัวลำภู	North-East
Na Di	นาดี	Dan Sai	ด่านซ้าย	Loei	เลย	North-East
Na Di	นาดี	Mueang Surin	เมืองสุรินทร์	Surin	สุรินทร์	North-East
Na Di	นาดี	Mueang Samut Sakhon	เมืองสมุทรสาคร	Samut Sakhon	สมุทรสาคร	Central
Na Din Dam	นาดินดำ	Mueang Loei	เมืองเลย	Loei	เลย	North-East
Na Dok Kham	นาดอกคำ	Na Duang	นาด้วง	Loei	เลย	North-East
Na Dong	นาดง	Pak Khat	ปากคาด	Bueng Kan	บึงกาฬ	North-East
Na Duang	นาด้วง	Na Duang	นาด้วง	Loei	เลย	North-East
Na Duea	นาเดื่อ	Si Songkhram	ศรีสงคราม	Nakhon Phanom	นครพนม	North-East
Na Dun	นาดูน	Na Dun	นาดูน	Maha Sarakham	มหาสารคาม	North-East
Na Fai	นาฝาย	Phu Pha Man	ภูผาม่าน	Khon Kaen	ขอนแก่น	North-East
Na Fai	นาฝาย	Mueang Chaiyaphum	เมืองชัยภูมิ	Chaiyaphum	ชัยภูมิ	North-East
Na Haeo	นาแห้ว	Na Haeo	นาแห้ว	Loei	เลย	North-East
Na Hi	นาฮี	Akat Amnuai	อากาศอำนวย	Sakon Nakhon	สกลนคร	North-East
Na Hin Lat	นาหินลาด	Pak Phli	ปากพลี	Nakhon Nayok	นครนายก	Central
Na Ho	นาหอ	Dan Sai	ด่านซ้าย	Loei	เลย	North-East
Na Hom	นาห่อม	Thung Si Udom	ทุ่งศรีอุดม	Ubon Ratchathani	อุบลราชธานี	North-East
Na Hu Kwang	นาหูกวาง	Thap Sakae	ทับสะแก	Prachuap Khiri Khan	ประจวบคีรีขันธ์	West
Na Hua Bo	นาหัวบ่อ	Phon Sawan	โพนสวรรค์	Nakhon Phanom	นครพนม	North-East
Na Hua Bo	นาหัวบ่อ	Phanna Nikhom	พรรณนานิคม	Sakon Nakhon	สกลนคร	North-East
Na In	นาอิน	Phichai	พิชัย	Uttaradit	อุตรดิตถ์	North
Na Kacha	นากะชะ	Chawang	ฉวาง	Nakhon Si Thammarat	นครศรีธรรมราช	South
Na Kae	นาแก	Na Kae	นาแก	Nakhon Phanom	นครพนม	North-East
Na Kae	นาแก	Na Wang	นาวัง	Nong Bua Lamphu	หนองบัวลำภู	North-East
Na Kae	นาแก	Ngao	งาว	Lampang	ลำปาง	North
Na Kaeo	นาแก้ว	Ko Kha	เกาะคา	Lampang	ลำปาง	North
Na Kang	นากั้ง	Pak Khat	ปากคาด	Bueng Kan	บึงกาฬ	North-East
Na Kasem	นาเกษม	Thung Si Udom	ทุ่งศรีอุดม	Ubon Ratchathani	อุบลราชธานี	North-East
Na Ket	นาเกตุ	Khok Pho	โคกโพธิ์	Pattani	ปัตตานี	South
Na Kha	นาข่า	Mueang Udon Thani	เมืองอุดรธานี	Udon Thani	อุดรธานี	North-East
Na Kha	นาขา	Lang Suan	หลังสวน	Chumphon	ชุมพร	South
Na Kha	นาข่า	Mancha Khiri	มัญจาคีรี	Khon Kaen	ขอนแก่น	North-East
Na Kha	นาข่า	Tha Bo	ท่าบ่อ	Nong Khai	หนองคาย	North-East
Na Kha	นาข่า	Wapi Pathum	วาปีปทุม	Maha Sarakham	มหาสารคาม	North-East
Na Khae	นาแค	Na Yung	นายูง	Udon Thani	อุดรธานี	North-East
Na Khaem	นาแขม	Kabin Buri	กบินทร์บุรี	Prachin Buri	ปราจีนบุรี	East
Na Khaem	นาแขม	Mueang Loei	เมืองเลย	Loei	เลย	North-East
Na Khai	นาคาย	Tan Sum	ตาลสุม	Ubon Ratchathani	อุบลราชธานี	North-East
Na Kham Hai	นาคำไฮ	Mueang Nongbua Lamphu	เมืองหนองบัวลำภู	Nong Bua Lamphu	หนองบัวลำภู	North-East
Na Kham Yai	นาคำใหญ่	Khueang Nai	เขื่องใน	Ubon Ratchathani	อุบลราชธานี	North-East
Na Kham	นาขาม	Kuchinarai	กุฉินารายณ์	Kalasin	กาฬสินธุ์	North-East
Na Kham	นาขาม	Renu Nakhon	เรณูนคร	Nakhon Phanom	นครพนม	North-East
Na Kham	นาคำ	Si Mueang Mai	ศรีเมืองใหม่	Ubon Ratchathani	อุบลราชธานี	North-East
Na Kham	นาคำ	Wanon Niwat	วานรนิวาส	Sakon Nakhon	สกลนคร	North-East
Na Kham	นาคำ	Ban Dung	บ้านดุง	Udon Thani	อุดรธานี	North-East
Na Kham	นาคำ	Ubolratana	อุบลรัตน์	Khon Kaen	ขอนแก่น	North-East
Na Kham	นาคำ	Si Songkhram	ศรีสงคราม	Nakhon Phanom	นครพนม	North-East
Na Khamin	นาขมิ้น	Phon Sawan	โพนสวรรค์	Nakhon Phanom	นครพนม	North-East
Na Khao Sia	นาข้าวเสีย	Na Yong	นาโยง	Trang	ตรัง	South
Na Khao	หน้าเขา	Khao Phanom	เขาพนม	Krabi	กระบี่	South
Na Khayat	นาขยาด	Khuan Khanun	ควนขนุน	Phatthalung	พัทลุง	South
Na Khe	นาเข	Ban Phaeng	บ้านแพง	Nakhon Phanom	นครพนม	North-East
Na Khian	นาเคียน	Mueang Nakhon Si Thammarat	นครศรีธรรมราช	Nakhon Si Thammarat	นครศรีธรรมราช	South
Na Khliang	นาเขลียง	Chawang	ฉวาง	Nakhon Si Thammarat	นครศรีธรรมราช	South
Na Kho Ruea	นาคอเรือ	Hot	ฮอด	Chiang Mai	เชียงใหม่	North
Na Khok	นาโคก	Mueang Samut Sakhon	เมืองสมุทรสาคร	Samut Sakhon	สมุทรสาคร	Central
Na Khok	หน้าโคก	Phak Hai	ผักไห่	Phra Nakhon Si Ayutthaya	พระนครศรีอยุธยา	Central
Na Khom	นาขอม	Phaisali	ไพศาลี	Nakhon Sawan	นครสวรรค์	Central
Na Khrua	นาครัว	Mae Tha	แม่ทะ	Lampang	ลำปาง	North
Na Khu	นาคู่	Na Kae	นาแก	Nakhon Phanom	นครพนม	North-East
Na Khu	นาคู	Phak Hai	ผักไห่	Phra Nakhon Si Ayutthaya	พระนครศรีอยุธยา	Central
Na Khu	นาคูนาคู	Na Khu	นาคู	Kalasin	กาฬสินธุ์	North-East
Na Khum	นาขุม	Ban Khok	บ้านโคก	Uttaradit	อุตรดิตถ์	North
Na Khun Krai	นาขุนไกร	Si Samrong	ศรีสำโรง	Sukhothai	สุโขทัย	Central
Na Khun Yai	นาคูณใหญ่	Na Wa	นาหว้า	Nakhon Phanom	นครพนม	North-East
Na Kian	นาเกียน	Omkoi	อมก๋อย	Chiang Mai	เชียงใหม่	North
Na Klang	นากลาง	Na Klang	นากลาง	Nong Bua Lamphu	หนองบัวลำภู	North-East
Na Klang	นากลาง	Krok Phra	โกรกพระ	Nakhon Sawan	นครสวรรค์	Central
Na Klang	นากลาง	Sung Noen	สูงเนิน	Nakhon Ratchasima	นครราชสีมา	North-East
Na Kluea	นาเกลือ	Phra Samut Chedi	พระสมุทรเจดีย์	Samut Prakan	สมุทรปราการ	Central
Na Kluea	นาเกลือ	Kantang	กันตัง	Trang	ตรัง	South
Na Kluea	นาเกลือ	Bang Lamung	บางละมุง	Chonburi	ชลบุรี	East
Na Ko	นาเกาะ	Lom Kao	หล่มเก่า	Phetchabun	เพชรบูรณ์	Central
Na Ko	นาโก	Kuchinarai	กุฉินารายณ์	Kalasin	กาฬสินธุ์	North-East
Na Kok	นากอก	Nikhom Kham Soi	นิคมคำสร้อย	Mukdahan	มุกดาหาร	North-East
Na Kok	นากอก	Si Bun Rueang	ศรีบุญเรือง	Nong Bua Lamphu	หนองบัวลำภู	North-East
Na Krasaeng	นากระแซง	Det Udom	เดชอุดม	Ubon Ratchathani	อุบลราชธานี	North-East
Na Kratam	นากระตาม	Tha Sae	ท่าแซะ	Chumphon	ชุมพร	South
Na Kwang	นากว้าง	Mueang Udon Thani	เมืองอุดรธานี	Udon Thani	อุดรธานี	North-East
Na Lao	นาเหล่า	Na Wang	นาวัง	Nong Bua Lamphu	หนองบัวลำภู	North-East
Na Liang	นาเลียง	Na Kae	นาแก	Nakhon Phanom	นครพนม	North-East
Na Loen	นาเลิน	Si Mueang Mai	ศรีเมืองใหม่	Ubon Ratchathani	อุบลราชธานี	North-East
Na Loeng	นาเลิง	Selaphum	เสลภูมิ	Roi Et	ร้อยเอ็ด	North-East
Na Loeng	นาเลิง	Muang Sam Sip	ม่วงสามสิบ	Ubon Ratchathani	อุบลราชธานี	North-East
Na Luang Sen	นาหลวงเสน	Thung Song	ทุ่งสง	Nakhon Si Thammarat	นครศรีธรรมราช	South
Na Lueang	นาเหลือง	Wiang Sa	เวียงสา	Nan	น่าน	North
Na Ma La	นามาลา	Na Haeo	นาแห้ว	Loei	เลย	North-East
Na Mafueang	นามะเฟือง	Mueang Nongbua Lamphu	เมืองหนองบัวลำภู	Nong Bua Lamphu	หนองบัวลำภู	North-East
Na Mai	นาไหม	Ban Dung	บ้านดุง	Udon Thani	อุดรธานี	North-East
Na Mai	หน้าไม้	Bang Sai	บางไทร	Phra Nakhon Si Ayutthaya	พระนครศรีอยุธยา	Central
Na Mai	หน้าไม้	Lat Lum Kaeo	ลาดหลุมแก้ว	Pathum Thani	ปทุมธานี	Central
Na Mai Phai	นาไม้ไผ่	Thung Song	ทุ่งสง	Nakhon Si Thammarat	นครศรีธรรมราช	South
Na Makhuea	นามะเขือ	Sahatsakhan	สหัสขันธ์	Kalasin	กาฬสินธุ์	North-East
Na Makhuea	นามะเขือ	Pla Pak	ปลาปาก	Nakhon Phanom	นครพนม	North-East
Na Matum	นามะตูม	Phanat Nikhom	พนัสนิคม	Chonburi	ชลบุรี	East
Na Mo Bun	นาหมอบุญ	Chulabhorn	จุฬาภรณ์	Nakhon Si Thammarat	นครศรีธรรมราช	South
Na Mo Ma	นาหมอม้า	Mueang Amnat Charoen	เมืองอำนาจเจริญ	Amnat Charoen	อำนาจเจริญ	North-East
Na Mo Si	นาหมอศรี	Na Thawi (Malay: Nawi)	นาทวี	Songkhla	สงขลา	South
Na Mom	นาหม่อม	Na Mom	นาหม่อม	Songkhla	สงขลา	South
Na Mon	นามน	Na Mon	นามน	Kalasin	กาฬสินธุ์	North-East
Na Mong	นาม่อง	Kut Bak	กุดบาก	Sakon Nakhon	สกลนคร	North-East
Na Muang	นาม่วง	Prachaksinlapakhom	ประจักษ์ศิลปาคม	Udon Thani	อุดรธานี	North-East
Na Mueang	หน้าเมือง	Ko Samui	เกาะสมุย	Surat Thani	สุราษฎร์ธานี	South
Na Mueang	นาเมือง	Selaphum	เสลภูมิ	Roi Et	ร้อยเอ็ด	North-East
Na Mueang	หน้าเมือง	Mueang Prachinburi	เมืองปราจีนบุรี	Prachin Buri	ปราจีนบุรี	East
Na Mueang	หน้าเมือง	Mueang Chachoengsao	เมืองฉะเชิงเทรา	Chachoengsao	ฉะเชิงเทรา	East
Na Mueang	หน้าเมือง	Mueang Ratchaburi	เมืองราชบุรี	Ratchaburi	ราชบุรี	West
Na Mueang Phet	นาเมืองเพชร	Sikao	สิเกา	Trang	ตรัง	South
Na Muen Si	นาหมื่นศรี	Na Yong	นาโยง	Trang	ตรัง	South
Na Nai	นาใน	Phanna Nikhom	พรรณนานิคม	Sakon Nakhon	สกลนคร	North-East
Na Nai	นาใน	Phon Sawan	โพนสวรรค์	Nakhon Phanom	นครพนม	North-East
Na Nak	นานาค	Tak Bai (Malay: Tabal)	ตากใบ	Narathiwat	นราธิวาส	South
Na Nang	นาหนัง	Phon Phisai	โพนพิสัย	Nong Khai	หนองคาย	North-East
Na Nat	นาหนาด	That Phanom	ธาตุพนม	Nakhon Phanom	นครพนม	North-East
Na Ngam	นางาม	Selaphum	เสลภูมิ	Roi Et	ร้อยเอ็ด	North-East
Na Ngam	นางาม	Renu Nakhon	เรณูนคร	Nakhon Phanom	นครพนม	North-East
Na Ngam	นางาม	Mancha Khiri	มัญจาคีรี	Khon Kaen	ขอนแก่น	North-East
Na Ngio	นางิ้ว	Khao Suan Kwang	เขาสวนกวาง	Khon Kaen	ขอนแก่น	North-East
Na Ngio	นางิ้ว	Sangkhom	สังคม	Nong Khai	หนองคาย	North-East
Na Ngua	นางัว	Nam Som	น้ำโสม	Udon Thani	อุดรธานี	North-East
Na Ngua	นางัว	Na Wa	นาหว้า	Nakhon Phanom	นครพนม	North-East
Na Ngua	นางั่ว	Mueang Phetchabun	เมืองเพชรบูรณ์	Phetchabun	เพชรบูรณ์	Central
Na Ngua	นางัว	Ban Phaeng	บ้านแพง	Nakhon Phanom	นครพนม	North-East
Na Nok Kok	นานกกก	Laplae	ลับแล	Uttaradit	อุตรดิตถ์	North
Na Nong Phai	นาหนองไผ่	Chumphon Buri	ชุมพลบุรี	Surin	สุรินทร์	North-East
Na Nong Thum	นาหนองทุ่ม	Kaeng Khro	แก้งคร้อ	Chaiyaphum	ชัยภูมิ	North-East
Na Nong Thum	นาหนองทุ่ม	Chum Phae	ชุมแพ	Khon Kaen	ขอนแก่น	North-East
Na Not	นาโหนด	Mueang Phatthalung	เมืองพัทลุง	Phatthalung	พัทลุง	South
Na Nuan	นานวน	Sanom	สนม	Surin	สุรินทร์	North-East
Na Nuea	นาเหนือ	Ao Luek	อ่าวลึก	Krabi	กระบี่	South
Na O	นาอ้อ	Mueang Loei	เมืองเลย	Loei	เลย	North-East
Na Pa Saeng	นาป่าแซง	Pathum Ratchawongsa	ปทุมราชวงศา	Amnat Charoen	อำนาจเจริญ	North-East
Na Pa	นาป่า	Mueang Phetchabun	เมืองเพชรบูรณ์	Phetchabun	เพชรบูรณ์	Central
Na Pa	นาป่า	Mueang Chonburi	เมืองชลบุรี	Chonburi	ชลบุรี	East
Na Pakho	นาปะขอ	Bang Kaeo	บางแก้ว	Phatthalung	พัทลุง	South
Na Pang	นาปัง	Phu Phiang	ภูเพียง	Nan	น่าน	North
Na Phaeng	นาแพง	Khok Pho Chai	โคกโพธิ์ไชย	Khon Kaen	ขอนแก่น	North-East
Na Phala	นาพละ	Mueang Trang	เมืองตรัง	Trang	ตรัง	South
Na Phan Sam	นาพันสาม	Mueang Phetchaburi	เมืองเพชรบุรี	Phetchaburi	เพชรบุรี	West
Na Phaya	นาพญา	Lang Suan	หลังสวน	Chumphon	ชุมพร	South
Na Phiang	นาเพียง	Kusuman	กุสุมาลย์	Sakon Nakhon	สกลนคร	North-East
Na Phiang	นาเพียง	Chum Phae	ชุมแพ	Khon Kaen	ขอนแก่น	North-East
Na Phin	นาพิน	Trakan Phuet Phon	ตระการพืชผล	Ubon Ratchathani	อุบลราชธานี	North-East
Na Pho Klang	นาโพธิ์กลาง	Khong Chiam	โขงเจียม	Ubon Ratchathani	อุบลราชธานี	North-East
Na Pho	นาโพธิ์	Sawi	สวี	Chumphon	ชุมพร	South
Na Pho	นาโพธิ์	Thung Song	ทุ่งสง	Nakhon Si Thammarat	นครศรีธรรมราช	South
Na Pho	นาโพธิ์	Kusuman	กุสุมาลย์	Sakon Nakhon	สกลนคร	North-East
Na Pho	นาโพธิ์	Kut Rang	กุดรัง	Maha Sarakham	มหาสารคาม	North-East
Na Pho	นาโพธิ์	Buntharik	บุณฑริก	Ubon Ratchathani	อุบลราชธานี	North-East
Na Pho	นาโพธิ์	Mueang Roi Et	เมืองร้อยเอ็ด	Roi Et	ร้อยเอ็ด	North-East
Na Pho	นาโพธิ์	Phibun Mangsahan	พิบูลมังสาหาร	Ubon Ratchathani	อุบลราชธานี	North-East
Na Pho	นาโพธิ์	Na Pho	นาโพธิ์	Buriram	บุรีรัมย์	North-East
Na Phra Lan	หน้าพระลาน	Chaloem Phra Kiat	เฉลิมพระเกียรติ	Saraburi	สระบุรี	Central
Na Phrathat	หน้าพระธาตุ	Phanat Nikhom	พนัสนิคม	Chonburi	ชลบุรี	East
Na Phru	นาพรุ	Phra Phrom	พระพรหม	Nakhon Si Thammarat	นครศรีธรรมราช	South
Na Phu	นาพู่	Phen	เพ็ญ	Udon Thani	อุดรธานี	North-East
Na Phu	นาภู	Yang Sisurat	ยางสีสุราช	Maha Sarakham	มหาสารคาม	North-East
Na Phue	นาผือ	Mueang Amnat Charoen	เมืองอำนาจเจริญ	Amnat Charoen	อำนาจเจริญ	North-East
Na Phueng	นาพึง	Na Haeo	นาแห้ว	Loei	เลย	North-East
Na Phun	นาพูน	Wang Chin	วังชิ้น	Phrae	แพร่	North
Na Pong	นาโป่ง	Thoen	เถิน	Lampang	ลำปาง	North
Na Pong	นาโป่ง	Mueang Loei	เมืองเลย	Loei	เลย	North-East
Na Pradu	นาประดู่	Khok Pho	โคกโพธิ์	Pattani	ปัตตานี	South
Na Pradu	หน้าประดู่	Phan Thong	พานทอง	Chonburi	ชลบุรี	East
Na Prang	นาปรัง	Pong	ปง	Phayao	พะเยา	North
Na Rai Luang	นาไร่หลวง	Song Khwae	สองแคว	Nan	น่าน	North
Na Rat Khwai	นาราชควาย	Mueang Nakhon Phanom	เมืองนครพนม	Nakhon Phanom	นครพนม	North-East
Na Reng	นาเหรง	Nopphitam	นบพิตำ	Nakhon Si Thammarat	นครศรีธรรมราช	South
Na Riang	นาเรียง	Phrom Khiri	พรหมคีรี	Nakhon Si Thammarat	นครศรีธรรมราช	South
Na Roek	นาเริก	Phanat Nikhom	พนัสนิคม	Chonburi	ชลบุรี	East
Na Rueang	นาเรือง	Na Yia	นาเยีย	Ubon Ratchathani	อุบลราชธานี	North-East
Na Rung	นารุ่ง	Sikhoraphum	ศีขรภูมิ	Surin	สุรินทร์	North-East
Na Sa-at	นาสะอาด	Sang Khom	สร้างคอม	Udon Thani	อุดรธานี	North-East
Na Sabaeng	นาสะแบง	Si Wilai	ศรีวิไล	Bueng Kan	บึงกาฬ	North-East
Na Saeng	นาแซง	Selaphum	เสลภูมิ	Roi Et	ร้อยเอ็ด	North-East
Na Saeng	นาแซง	Lom Kao	หล่มเก่า	Phetchabun	เพชรบูรณ์	Central
Na Saeng	นาแสง	Si Wilai	ศรีวิไล	Bueng Kan	บึงกาฬ	North-East
Na Saeng	นาแส่ง	Ko Kha	เกาะคา	Lampang	ลำปาง	North
Na Sai	นาทราย	Phibun Rak	พิบูลย์รักษ์	Udon Thani	อุดรธานี	North-East
Na Sai	นาทราย	Mueang Nakhon Phanom	เมืองนครพนม	Nakhon Phanom	นครพนม	North-East
Na Sai	นาทราย	Li	ลี้	Lamphun	ลำพูน	North
Na Sai	นาทราย	Mueang Nakhon Si Thammarat	นครศรีธรรมราช	Nakhon Si Thammarat	นครศรีธรรมราช	South
Na Sak	นาสัก	Mae Mo	แม่เมาะ	Lampang	ลำปาง	North
Na Sak	นาสัก	Sawi	สวี	Chumphon	ชุมพร	South
Na Sam	นาซำ	Lom Kao	หล่มเก่า	Phetchabun	เพชรบูรณ์	Central
Na Samai	นาสะไม	Trakan Phuet Phon	ตระการพืชผล	Ubon Ratchathani	อุบลราชธานี	North-East
Na Sameng	นาสะเม็ง	Don Tan	ดอนตาล	Mukdahan	มุกดาหาร	North-East
Na San	นาสาร	Ban Na San	บ้านนาสาร	Surat Thani	สุราษฎร์ธานี	South
Na San	นาสาร	Phra Phrom	พระพรหม	Nakhon Si Thammarat	นครศรีธรรมราช	South
Na Sanun	นาสนุ่น	Si Thep	ศรีเทพ	Phetchabun	เพชรบูรณ์	Central
Na Sao	นาซ่าว	Chiang Khan	เชียงคาน	Loei	เลย	North-East
Na Saton	หน้าสตน	Hua Sai	หัวไทร	Nakhon Si Thammarat	นครศรีธรรมราช	South
Na Sawan	นาสวรรค์	Mueang Bueng Kan	เมืองบึงกาฬ	Bueng Kan	บึงกาฬ	North-East
Na Si Nuan	นาสีนวน	Kantharawichai	กันทรวิชัย	Maha Sarakham	มหาสารคาม	North-East
Na Si Nuan	นาสีนวน	Mueang Mukdahan	เมืองมุกดาหาร	Mukdahan	มุกดาหาร	North-East
Na Si Nuan	นาสีนวล	Phayakkhaphum Phisai	พยัคฆภูมิพิสัย	Maha Sarakham	มหาสารคาม	North-East
Na Si	นาสี	Suwannakhuha	สุวรรณคูหา	Nong Bua Lamphu	หนองบัวลำภู	North-East
Na Siao	นาเสียว	Mueang Chaiyaphum	เมืองชัยภูมิ	Chaiyaphum	ชัยภูมิ	North-East
Na Sing	นาสิงห์	Si Wilai	ศรีวิไล	Bueng Kan	บึงกาฬ	North-East
Na So	นาซอ	Wanon Niwat	วานรนิวาส	Sakon Nakhon	สกลนคร	North-East
Na Sok	นาโสก	Mueang Mukdahan	เมืองมุกดาหาร	Mukdahan	มุกดาหาร	North-East
Na Som	นาโสม	Chai Badan	ชัยบาดาล	Lopburi	ลพบุรี	Central
Na Suan	นาสวน	Si Sawat	ศรีสวัสดิ์	Kanchanaburi	กาญจนบุรี	West
Na Suang	นาส่วง	Det Udom	เดชอุดม	Ubon Ratchathani	อุบลราชธานี	North-East
Na Ta Khwan	นาตาขวัญ	Mueang Rayong	เมืองระยอง	Rayong	ระยอง	East
Na Ta Luang	นาตาล่วง	Mueang Trang	เมืองตรัง	Trang	ตรัง	South
Na Tae	นาแต้	Mueang Amnat Charoen	เมืองอำนาจเจริญ	Amnat Charoen	อำนาจเจริญ	North-East
Na Tae	นาแต้	Kham Ta Kla	คำตากล้า	Sakon Nakhon	สกลนคร	North-East
Na Tai	นาใต้	Ban Na Doem	บ้านนาเดิม	Surat Thani	สุราษฎร์ธานี	South
Na Tan	นาตาล	Na Tan	นาตาล	Ubon Ratchathani	อุบลราชธานี	North-East
Na Tan	นาตาล	Tao Ngoi	เต่างอย	Sakon Nakhon	สกลนคร	North-East
Na Tan	นาตาล	Tha Khantho	ท่าคันโท	Kalasin	กาฬสินธุ์	North-East
Na Tham Nuea	นาท่ามเหนือ	Mueang Trang	เมืองตรัง	Trang	ตรัง	South
Na Tham Tai	นาท่ามใต้	Mueang Trang	เมืองตรัง	Trang	ตรัง	South
Na Tham	หน้าถ้ำ	Mueang Yala	เมืองยะลา	Yala	ยะลา	South
Na Than	นาทัน	Kham Muang	คำม่วง	Kalasin	กาฬสินธุ์	North-East
Na Thap Hai	นาทับไฮ	Rattanawapi	รัตนวาปี	Nong Khai	หนองคาย	North-East
Na Thap	นาทับ	Chana (Malay: Chenok)	จะนะ	Songkhla	สงขลา	South
Na Thawi	นาทวี	Na Thawi (Malay: Nawi)	นาทวี	Songkhla	สงขลา	South
Na Thom	นาทม	Na Thom	นาทม	Nakhon Phanom	นครพนม	North-East
Na Thom	นาทม	Thung Fon	ทุ่งฝน	Udon Thani	อุดรธานี	North-East
Na Thom	นาท่อม	Mueang Phatthalung	เมืองพัทลุง	Phatthalung	พัทลุง	South
Na Thon	นาถ่อน	That Phanom	ธาตุพนม	Nakhon Phanom	นครพนม	North-East
Na Thon	นาทอน	Thung Wa	ทุ่งหว้า	Satun	สตูล	South
Na Thong	นาทอง	Chiang Yuen	เชียงยืน	Maha Sarakham	มหาสารคาม	North-East
Na Thung	นาทุ่ง	Mueang Chumphon	เมืองชุมพร	Chumphon	ชุมพร	South
Na Thung	นาทุ่ง	Sawankhalok	สวรรคโลก	Sukhothai	สุโขทัย	Central
Na To Ming	นาโต๊ะหมิง	Mueang Trang	เมืองตรัง	Trang	ตรัง	South
Na Toei	นาเตย	Thai Mueang	ท้ายเหมือง	Phang Nga	พังงา	South
Na Udom	นาอุดม	Phon Thong	โพนทอง	Roi Et	ร้อยเอ็ด	North-East
Na Udom	นาอุดม	Nikhom Kham Soi	นิคมคำสร้อย	Mukdahan	มุกดาหาร	North-East
Na Wa	นาหว้า	Na Wa	นาหว้า	Nakhon Phanom	นครพนม	North-East
Na Wa	นาหว้า	Pathum Ratchawongsa	ปทุมราชวงศา	Amnat Charoen	อำนาจเจริญ	North-East
Na Wa	นาหว้า	Chana (Malay: Chenok)	จะนะ	Songkhla	สงขลา	South
Na Wa	นาหว้า	Phu Wiang	ภูเวียง	Khon Kaen	ขอนแก่น	North-East
Na Wae	นาแว	Chawang	ฉวาง	Nakhon Si Thammarat	นครศรีธรรมราช	South
Na Waeng	นาแวง	Khemarat	เขมราฐ	Ubon Ratchathani	อุบลราชธานี	North-East
Na Wang Hin	นาวังหิน	Phanat Nikhom	พนัสนิคม	Chonburi	ชลบุรี	East
Na Wang	นาวัง	Mueang Amnat Charoen	เมืองอำนาจเจริญ	Amnat Charoen	อำนาจเจริญ	North-East
Na Wiang	นาเวียง	Senangkhanikhom	เสนางคนิคม	Amnat Charoen	อำนาจเจริญ	North-East
Na Wong	นาวง	Huai Yot	ห้วยยอด	Trang	ตรัง	South
Na Wung	นาวุ้ง	Mueang Phetchaburi	เมืองเพชรบุรี	Phetchaburi	เพชรบุรี	West
Na Yai	นาใหญ่	Suwannaphum	สุวรรณภูมิ	Roi Et	ร้อยเอ็ด	North-East
Na Yai Am	นายายอาม	Na Yai Am	นายายอาม	Chanthaburi	จันทบุรี	East
Na Yang	นายาง	Phichai	พิชัย	Uttaradit	อุตรดิตถ์	North
Na Yang	นายาง	Sop Prap	สบปราบ	Lampang	ลำปาง	North
Na Yang Klak	นายางกลัก	Thep Sathit	เทพสถิต	Chaiyaphum	ชัยภูมิ	North-East
Na Yao	นายาว	Phra Phutthabat	พระพุทธบาท	Saraburi	สระบุรี	Central
Na Yia	นาเยีย	Na Yia	นาเยีย	Ubon Ratchathani	อุบลราชธานี	North-East
Na Yom	นายม	Mueang Phetchabun	เมืองเพชรบูรณ์	Phetchabun	เพชรบูรณ์	Central
Na Yom	นายม	Mueang Amnat Charoen	เมืองอำนาจเจริญ	Amnat Charoen	อำนาจเจริญ	North-East
Na Yong Nuea	นาโยงเหนือ	Na Yong	นาโยง	Trang	ตรัง	South
Na Yong Tai	นาโยงใต้	Mueang Trang	เมืองตรัง	Trang	ตรัง	South
Na Yung	นายูง	Na Yung	นายูง	Udon Thani	อุดรธานี	North-East
Na Yung	นายูง	Si That	ศรีธาตุ	Udon Thani	อุดรธานี	North-East
Naeng Mut	แนงมุด	Kap Choeng	กาบเชิง	Surin	สุรินทร์	North-East
Nai Khlong Bang Pla Kot	ในคลองบางปลากด	Phra Samut Chedi	พระสมุทรเจดีย์	Samut Prakan	สมุทรปราการ	Central
Nai Khuan	ในควน	Yan Ta Khao	ย่านตาขาว	Trang	ตรัง	South
Nai Mueang	ในเมือง	Mueang Nakhon Ratchasima	เมืองนครราชสีมา	Nakhon Ratchasima	นครราชสีมา	North-East
Nai Mueang	ในเมือง	Mueang Lamphun	เมืองลำพูน	Lamphun	ลำพูน	North
Nai Mueang	ในเมือง	Mueang Nakhon Phanom	เมืองนครพนม	Nakhon Phanom	นครพนม	North-East
Nai Mueang	ในเมือง	Mueang Phichit	เมืองพิจิตร	Phichit	พิจิตร	Central
Nai Mueang	ในเมือง	Mueang Roi Et	เมืองร้อยเอ็ด	Roi Et	ร้อยเอ็ด	North-East
Nai Mueang	ในเมือง	Mueang Surin	เมืองสุรินทร์	Surin	สุรินทร์	North-East
Nai Mueang	ในเมือง	Mueang Nakhon Si Thammarat	นครศรีธรรมราช	Nakhon Si Thammarat	นครศรีธรรมราช	South
Nai Mueang	ในเมือง	Mueang Phitsanulok	เมืองพิษณุโลก	Phitsanulok	พิษณุโลก	Central
Nai Mueang	ในเมือง	Mueang Ubon Ratchathani	เมืองอุบลราชธานี	Ubon Ratchathani	อุบลราชธานี	North-East
Nai Mueang	ในเมือง	Mueang Chaiyaphum	เมืองชัยภูมิ	Chaiyaphum	ชัยภูมิ	North-East
Nai Mueang	ในเมือง	Mueang Phetchabun	เมืองเพชรบูรณ์	Phetchabun	เพชรบูรณ์	Central
Nai Mueang	ในเมือง	Phimai	พิมาย	Nakhon Ratchasima	นครราชสีมา	North-East
Nai Mueang	ในเมือง	Mueang Khon Kaen	เมืองขอนแก่น	Khon Kaen	ขอนแก่น	North-East
Nai Mueang	ในเมือง	Mueang Buriram	เมืองบุรีรัมย์	Buriram	บุรีรัมย์	North-East
Nai Mueang	ในเมือง	Mueang Chai Nat	เมืองชัยนาท	Chai Nat	ชัยนาท	Central
Nai Mueang	ในเมือง	Wiang Kao	เวียงเก่า	Khon Kaen	ขอนแก่น	North-East
Nai Mueang	ในเมือง	Mueang Nong Khai	เมืองหนองคาย	Nong Khai	หนองคาย	North-East
Nai Mueang	ในเมือง	Phichai	พิชัย	Uttaradit	อุตรดิตถ์	North
Nai Mueang	ในเมือง	Sawankhalok	สวรรคโลก	Sukhothai	สุโขทัย	Central
Nai Mueang	ในเมือง	Ban Phai	บ้านไผ่	Khon Kaen	ขอนแก่น	North-East
Nai Tao	ในเตา	Huai Yot	ห้วยยอด	Trang	ตรัง	South
Nai Wiang	ในเวียง	Mueang Phrae	เมืองแพร่	Phrae	แพร่	North
Nai Wong Nuea	ในวงเหนือ	La-un	ละอุ่น	Ranong	ระนอง	South
Nai Wong Tai	ในวงใต้	La-un	ละอุ่น	Ranong	ระนอง	South
Nakha	นาคา	Suk Samran	สุขสำราญ	Ranong	ระนอง	South
Nakhon Chai Si	นครชัยศรี	Nakhon Chai Si	นครชัยศรี	Nakhon Pathom	นครปฐม	Central
Nakhon Chedi	นครเจดีย์	Pa Sang	ป่าซาง	Lamphun	ลำพูน	North
Nakhon Chum	นครชุม	Mueang Kamphaeng Phet	เมืองกำแพงเพชร	Kamphaeng Phet	กำแพงเพชร	Central
Nakhon Chum	นครชุม	Nakhon Thai	นครไทย	Phitsanulok	พิษณุโลก	Central
Nakhon Chum	นครชุมน์	Ban Pong	บ้านโป่ง	Ratchaburi	ราชบุรี	West
Nakhon Doet	นครเดิฐ	Si Nakhon	ศรีนคร	Sukhothai	สุโขทัย	Central
Nakhon Luang	นครหลวง	Nakhon Luang	นครหลวง	Phra Nakhon Si Ayutthaya	พระนครศรีอยุธยา	Central
Nakhon Nayok	นครนายก	Mueang Nakhon Nayok	เมืองนครนายก	Nakhon Nayok	นครนายก	Central
Nakhon Pathom	นครปฐม	Mueang Nakhon Pathom	เมืองนครปฐม	Nakhon Phanom	นครพนม	North-East
Nakhon Sawan Ok	นครสวรรค์ออก	Mueang Nakhon Sawan	เมืองนครสวรรค์	Nakhon Sawan	นครสวรรค์	Central
Nakhon Sawan Tok	นครสวรรค์ตก	Mueang Nakhon Sawan	เมืองนครสวรรค์	Nakhon Sawan	นครสวรรค์	Central
Nakhon Thai	นครไทย	Nakhon Thai	นครไทย	Phitsanulok	พิษณุโลก	Central
Nam Ang	น้ำอ่าง	Tron	ตรอน	Uttaradit	อุตรดิตถ์	North
Nam Bo Luang	น้ำบ่อหลวง	San Pa Tong	สันป่าตอง	Chiang Mai	เชียงใหม่	North
Nam Cham	น้ำชำ	Sung Men	สูงเม่น	Phrae	แพร่	North
Nam Cham	น้ำชำ	Mueang Phrae	เมืองแพร่	Phrae	แพร่	North
Nam Chan	น้ำจั้น	Seka	เซกา	Bueng Kan	บึงกาฬ	North-East
Nam Chiao	น้ำเชี่ยว	Laem Ngop	แหลมงอบ	Trat	ตราด	East
Nam Cho	น้ำโจ้	Mae Tha	แม่ทะ	Lampang	ลำปาง	North
Nam Chuet	น้ำจืด	Kra Buri	กระบุรี	Ranong	ระนอง	South
Nam Chuet Noi	น้ำจืดน้อย	Kra Buri	กระบุรี	Ranong	ระนอง	South
Nam Chun	น้ำชุน	Lom Sak	หล่มสัก	Phetchabun	เพชรบูรณ์	Central
Nam Daeng	หนามแดง	Mueang Chachoengsao	เมืองฉะเชิงเทรา	Chachoengsao	ฉะเชิงเทรา	East
Nam Dam	น้ำดำ	Thung Yang Daeng	ทุ่งยางแดง	Pattani	ปัตตานี	South
Nam Dip	น้ำดิบ	Pa Sang	ป่าซาง	Lamphun	ลำพูน	North
Nam Hak	น้ำหัก	Khiri Rat Nikhom	คีรีรัฐนิคม	Surat Thani	สุราษฎร์ธานี	South
Nam Hia	น้ำเฮี้ย	Lom Sak	หล่มสัก	Phetchabun	เพชรบูรณ์	Central
Nam Kaen	น้ำแก่น	Phu Phiang	ภูเพียง	Nan	น่าน	North
Nam Kam	น้ำก่ำ	That Phanom	ธาตุพนม	Nakhon Phanom	นครพนม	North-East
Nam Khaem	น้ำแคม	Tha Li	ท่าลี่	Loei	เลย	North-East
Nam Kham	น้ำคำ	Suwannaphum	สุวรรณภูมิ	Roi Et	ร้อยเอ็ด	North-East
Nam Kham	น้ำคำ	Mueang Sisaket	เมืองศรีสะเกษ	Sisaket	ศรีสะเกษ	North-East
Nam Khao	น้ำขาว	Chana (Malay: Chenok)	จะนะ	Songkhla	สงขลา	South
Nam Khiao	น้ำเขียว	Rattanaburi	รัตนบุรี	Surin	สุรินทร์	North-East
Nam Khok	น้ำคอก	Mueang Rayong	เมืองระยอง	Rayong	ระยอง	East
Nam Khrai	น้ำไคร้	Nam Pat	น้ำปาด	Uttaradit	อุตรดิตถ์	North
Nam Khum	น้ำขุม	Si Nakhon	ศรีนคร	Sukhothai	สุโขทัย	Central
Nam Kian	น้ำเกี๋ยน	Phu Phiang	ภูเพียง	Nan	น่าน	North
Nam Kliang	น้ำเกลี้ยง	Nam Kliang	น้ำเกลี้ยง	Sisaket	ศรีสะเกษ	North-East
Nam Ko	น้ำก้อ	Lom Sak	หล่มสัก	Phetchabun	เพชรบูรณ์	Central
Nam Kum	น้ำกุ่ม	Nakhon Thai	นครไทย	Phitsanulok	พิษณุโลก	Central
Nam Lao	น้ำเลา	Rong Kwang	ร้องกวาง	Phrae	แพร่	North
Nam Man	น้ำหมัน	Tha Pla	ท่าปลา	Uttaradit	อุตรดิตถ์	North
Nam Man	น้ำหมาน	Mueang Loei	เมืองเลย	Loei	เลย	North-East
Nam Mong	น้ำโมง	Tha Bo	ท่าบ่อ	Nong Khai	หนองคาย	North-East
Nam Muap	น้ำมวบ	Wiang Sa	เวียงสา	Nan	น่าน	North
Nam Nao	น้ำหนาว	Nam Nao	น้ำหนาว	Phetchabun	เพชรบูรณ์	Central
Nam Noi	น้ำน้อย	Hat Yai	หาดใหญ่	Songkhla	สงขลา	South
Nam Om	น้ำอ้อม	Kaset Wisai	เกษตรวิสัย	Roi Et	ร้อยเอ็ด	North-East
Nam Om	น้ำอ้อม	Kantharalak	กันทรลักษ์	Sisaket	ศรีสะเกษ	North-East
Nam Om	น้ำอ้อม	Kranuan	กระนวน	Khon Kaen	ขอนแก่น	North-East
Nam Pen	น้ำเป็น	Khao Chamao	เขาชะเมา	Rayong	ระยอง	East
Nam Phai	น้ำไผ่	Nam Pat	น้ำปาด	Uttaradit	อุตรดิตถ์	North
Nam Phi	น้ำพี้	Thong Saen Khan	ทองแสนขัน	Uttaradit	อุตรดิตถ์	North
Nam Phon	น้ำพ่น	Nong Wua So	หนองวัวซอ	Udon Thani	อุดรธานี	North-East
Nam Phong	น้ำพอง	Nam Phong	น้ำพอง	Khon Kaen	ขอนแก่น	North-East
Nam Phrae	น้ำแพร่	Hang Dong	หางดง	Chiang Mai	เชียงใหม่	North
Nam Phrae	น้ำแพร่	Phrao	พร้าว	Chiang Mai	เชียงใหม่	North
Nam Phu	น้ำพุ	Mueang Ratchaburi	เมืองราชบุรี	Ratchaburi	ราชบุรี	West
Nam Phu	น้ำพุ	Ban Nà Sản	บ้านนาสาร	Surat Thani	สุราษฎร์ธานี	South
Nam Phut	น้ำผุด	Mueang Trang	เมืองตรัง	Trang	ตรัง	South
Nam Phut	น้ำผุด	La-ngu	ละงู	Satun	สตูล	South
Nam Plik	น้ำปลีก	Mueang Amnat Charoen	เมืองอำนาจเจริญ	Amnat Charoen	อำนาจเจริญ	North-East
Nam Pua	น้ำปั้ว	Wiang Sa	เวียงสา	Nan	น่าน	North
Nam Rat	น้ำรัด	Nong Muang Khai	หนองม่วงไข่	Phrae	แพร่	North
Nam Rit	น้ำริด	Mueang Uttaradit	เมืองอุตรดิตถ์	Uttaradit	อุตรดิตถ์	North
Nam Ron	น้ำร้อน	Mueang Phetchabun	เมืองเพชรบูรณ์	Phetchabun	เพชรบูรณ์	Central
Nam Ron	น้ำร้อน	Wichian Buri	วิเชียรบุรี	Phetchabun	เพชรบูรณ์	Central
Nam Rop	น้ำรอบ	Phunphin	พุนพิน	Surat Thani	สุราษฎร์ธานี	South
Nam Rop	น้ำรอบ	Lan Sak	ลานสัก	Uthai Thani	อุทัยธานี	Central
Nam Ruem	น้ำรึม	Mueang Tak	เมืองตาก	Tak	ตาก	West
Nam Sai	น้ำใส	Chaturaphak Phiman	จตุรพักตรพิมาน	Roi Et	ร้อยเอ็ด	North-East
Nam Som	น้ำโสม	Nam Som	น้ำโสม	Udon Thani	อุดรธานี	North-East
Nam Song	น้ำทรง	Phayuha Khiri	พยุหะคีรี	Nakhon Sawan	นครสวรรค์	Central
Nam Suai	น้ำสวย	Mueang Loei	เมืองเลย	Loei	เลย	North-East
Nam Suem	น้ำซึม	Mueang Uthai Thani	เมืองอุทัยธานี	Uthai Thani	อุทัยธานี	Central
Nam Sut	น้ำสุด	Phatthana Nikhom	พัฒนานิคม	Lopburi	ลพบุรี	Central
Nam Tan	น้ำตาล	In Buri	อินทร์บุรี	Sing Buri	สิงห์บุรี	Central
Nam Tao	น้ำเต้า	Bang Ban	บางบาล	Phra Nakhon Si Ayutthaya	พระนครศรีอยุธยา	Central
Nam Tao	น้ำเต้า	Maha Rat	มหาราช	Phra Nakhon Si Ayutthaya	พระนครศรีอยุธยา	Central
Nam Thiang	น้ำเที่ยง	Khamcha-i	คำชะอี	Mukdahan	มุกดาหาร	North-East
Nam Thun	น้ำทูน	Tha Li	ท่าลี่	Loei	เลย	North-East
Nam Tok	น้ำตก	Thung Song	ทุ่งสง	Nakhon Si Thammarat	นครศรีธรรมราช	South
Nam Waen	น้ำแวน	Chiang Kham	ชียงคำ	Phayao	พะเยา	North
Nang Buat	นางบวช	Doem Bang Nang Buat	เดิมบางนางบวช	Suphan Buri	สุพรรณบุรี	Central
Nang Daet	นางแดด	Nong Bua Daeng	หนองบัวแดง	Chaiyaphum	ชัยภูมิ	North-East
Nang Kaeo	นางแก้ว	Photharam	โพธาราม	Ratchaburi	ราชบุรี	West
Nang Lae	นางแล	Mueang Chiang Rai	เมืองเชียงราย	Chiang Rai	เชียงราย	North
Nang Long	นางหลง	Cha-uat	ชะอวด	Nakhon Si Thammarat	นครศรีธรรมราช	South
Nang Lue	นางลือ	Mueang Chai Nat	เมืองชัยนาท	Chai Nat	ชัยนาท	Central
Nang Phaya	นางพญา	Tha Pla	ท่าปลา	Uttaradit	อุตรดิตถ์	North
Nang Ram	นางรำ	Prathai	ประทาย	Nakhon Ratchasima	นครราชสีมา	North-East
Nang Rong	นางรองนางรอง	Nang Rong	นางรอง	Buriram	บุรีรัมย์	North-East
Nang Takhian	นางตะเคียน	Mueang Samut Songkhram	เมืองสมุทรสงคราม	Samut Songkhram	สมุทรสงคราม	Central
Napu Pom	นาปู่ป้อม	Pang Mapha	ปางมะผ้า	Mae Hong Son	แม่ฮ่องสอน	North
Naraphirom	นราภิรมย์	Bang Len	บางเลน	Nakhon Pathom	นครปฐม	Central
Narong	ณรงค์	Si Narong	ศรีณรงค์	Surin	สุรินทร์	North-East
Nawamin	นวมินทร์	Khet Bueng Kum	บึงกุ่ม	Bangkok	กรุงเทพมหานคร	Central
Ngaeng	แงง	Pua	ปัว	Nan	น่าน	North
Ngao	หงาว	Thoeng	เทิง	Chiang Rai	เชียงราย	North
Ngao	หงาว	Mueang Ranong	เมืองระนอง	Ranong	ระนอง	South
Ngim	งิม	Pong	ปง	Phayao	พะเยา	North
Ngio	งิ้ว	Pak Thong Chai	ปักธงชัย	Nakhon Ratchasima	นครราชสีมา	North-East
Ngio	งิ้ว	Thoeng	เทิง	Chiang Rai	เชียงราย	North
Ngio	งิ้ว	Huai Thalaeng	ห้วยแถลง	Nakhon Ratchasima	นครราชสีมา	North-East
Ngio Don	งิ้วด่อน	Mueang Sakon Nakhon	เมืองสกลนคร	Sakon Nakhon	สกลนคร	North-East
Ngio Ngam	งิ้วงาม	Sao Hai	เสาไห้	Saraburi	สระบุรี	Central
Ngio Ngam	งิ้วงาม	Mueang Phitsanulok	เมืองพิษณุโลก	Phitsanulok	พิษณุโลก	Central
Ngio Ngam	งิ้วงาม	Mueang Uttaradit	เมืองอุตรดิตถ์	Uttaradit	อุตรดิตถ์	North
Ngio Rai	งิ้วราย	Mueang Lopburi	เมืองลพบุรี	Lopburi	ลพบุรี	Central
Ngio Rai	งิ้วราย	Nakhon Chai Si	นครชัยศรี	Nakhon Pathom	นครปฐม	Central
Ngio Rai	งิ้วราย	Taphan Hin	ตะพานหิน	Phichit	พิจิตร	Central
Ngio Rai	งิ้วราย	In Buri	อินทร์บุรี	Sing Buri	สิงห์บุรี	Central
Ngop	งอบ	Thung Chang	ทุ่งช้าง	Nan	น่าน	North
Ngua Ba	งัวบา	Wapi Pathum	วาปีปทุม	Maha Sarakham	มหาสารคาม	North-East
Nikhom	นิคม	Satuek	สตึก	Buriram	บุรีรัมย์	North-East
Nikhom	นิคม	Sahatsakhan	สหัสขันธ์	Kalasin	กาฬสินธุ์	North-East
Nikhom Huai Phueng	นิคมห้วยผึ้ง	Huai Phueng	ห้วยผึ้ง	Kalasin	กาฬสินธุ์	North-East
Nikhom Kham Soi	นิคมคำสร้อย	Nikhom Kham Soi	นิคมคำสร้อย	Mukdahan	มุกดาหาร	North-East
Nikhom Khao Bo Kaeo	นิคมเขาบ่อแก้ว	Phayuha Khiri	พยุหะคีรี	Nakhon Sawan	นครสวรรค์	Central
Nikhom Krasiao	นิคมกระเสียว	Dan Chang	ด่านช้าง	Suphan Buri	สุพรรณบุรี	Central
Nikhom Lam Narai	นิคมลำนารายณ์	Chai Badan	ชัยบาดาล	Lopburi	ลพบุรี	Central
Nikhom Nam Un	นิคมน้ำอูน	Nikhom Nam Un	นิคมน้ำอูน	Sakon Nakhon	สกลนคร	North-East
Nikhom Phatthana	นิคมพัฒนา	Nikhom Phatthana	นิคมพัฒนา	Rayong	ระยอง	East
Nikhom Phatthana	นิคมพัฒนา	Khukhan	ขุขันธ์	Sisaket	ศรีสะเกษ	North-East
Nikhom Phatthana	นิคมพัฒนา	Mueang Lampang	เมืองลำปาง	Lampang	ลำปาง	North
Nikhom Phatthana	นิคมพัฒนา	Manang	มะนัง	Satun	สตูล	South
Nikhom Phatthana	นิคมพัฒนา	Bang Rakam	บางระกำ	Phitsanulok	พิษณุโลก	Central
Nikhom Phatthana	นิคมพัฒนา	Non Sang	โนนสัง	Nong Bua Lamphu	หนองบัวลำภู	North-East
Nikhom Sang Ton Eng	นิคมสร้างตนเอง	Mueang Lopburi	เมืองลพบุรี	Lopburi	ลพบุรี	Central
Nikhom Sang Ton Eng	นิคมสร้างตนเอง	Phimai	พิมาย	Nakhon Ratchasima	นครราชสีมา	North-East
Nikhom Sang Ton-eng Lam Dom Noi	นิคมสร้างตนเองลำโดมน้อย	Sirindhorn	สิรินธร	Ubon Ratchathani	อุบลราชธานี	North-East
Nikhom Songkhro	นิคมสงเคราะห์	Mueang Udon Thani	เมืองอุดรธานี	Udon Thani	อุดรธานี	North-East
Nikhom Thung Pho Thale	นิคมทุ่งโพธิ์ทะเล	Mueang Kamphaeng Phet	เมืองกำแพงเพชร	Kamphaeng Phet	กำแพงเพชร	Central
Nin Phet	นิลเพชร	Bang Len	บางเลน	Nakhon Pathom	นครปฐม	Central
Niwet	นิเวศน์	Thawat Buri	ธวัชบุรี	Roi Et	ร้อยเอ็ด	North-East
Niyom Chai	นิยมชัย	Sa Bot	สระโบสถ์	Lopburi	ลพบุรี	Central
Noen Chaeng	เนินแจง	Mueang Uthai Thani	เมืองอุทัยธานี	Uthai Thani	อุทัยธานี	Central
Noen Hom	เนินหอม	Mueang Prachinburi	เมืองปราจีนบุรี	Prachin Buri	ปราจีนบุรี	East
Noen Kham	เนินขาม	Noen Kham	เนินขาม	Chai Nat	ชัยนาท	Central
Noen Khilek	เนินขี้เหล็ก	Lat Yao	ลาดยาว	Nakhon Sawan	นครสวรรค์	Central
Noen Kho	เนินฆ้อ	Klaeng	แกลง	Rayong	ระยอง	East
Noen Kum	เนินกุ่ม	Bang Krathum	บางกระทุ่ม	Phitsanulok	พิษณุโลก	Central
Noen Kwao	เนินกว้าว	Krok Phra	โกรกพระ	Nakhon Sawan	นครสวรรค์	Central
Noen Makok	เนินมะกอก	Phayuha Khiri	พยุหะคีรี	Nakhon Sawan	นครสวรรค์	Central
Noen Makok	เนินมะกอก	Bang Mun Nak	บางมูลนาก	Phichit	พิจิตร	Central
Noen Maprang	เนินมะปราง	Noen Maprang	เนินมะปราง	Phitsanulok	พิษณุโลก	Central
Noen Ngam	เนินงาม	Raman (Malay: Reman)	รามัน	Yala	ยะลา	South
Noen Phoem	เนินเพิ่ม	Nakhon Thai	นครไทย	Phitsanulok	พิษณุโลก	Central
Noen Phra Prang	เนินพระปรางค์	Song Phi Nong	สองพี่น้อง	Suphan Buri	สุพรรณบุรี	Central
Noen Phra	เนินพระ	Mueang Rayong	เมืองระยอง	Rayong	ระยอง	East
Noen Po	เนินปอ	Sam Ngam	สามง่าม	Phichit	พิจิตร	Central
Noen Sai	เนินทราย	Mueang Trat	เมืองตราด	Trat	ตราด	East
Noen Sala	เนินศาลา	Krok Phra	โกรกพระ	Nakhon Sawan	นครสวรรค์	Central
Noen Sawang	เนินสว่าง	Pho Prathap Chang	โพธิ์ประทับช้าง	Phichit	พิจิตร	Central
Noen Yang	เนินยาง	Kham Muang	คำม่วง	Kalasin	กาฬสินธุ์	North-East
Nok Mueang	นอกเมือง	Mueang Surin	เมืองสุรินทร์	Surin	สุรินทร์	North-East
Nok Ok	นกออก	Pak Thong Chai	ปักธงชัย	Nakhon Ratchasima	นครราชสีมา	North-East
Nom	หน่อม	At Samat	อาจสามารถ	Roi Et	ร้อยเอ็ด	North-East
Non	โนน	Non Narai	โนนนารายณ์	Surin	สุรินทร์	North-East
Non Buri	โนนบุรี	Sahatsakhan	สหัสขันธ์	Kalasin	กาฬสินธุ์	North-East
Non Chai Si	โนนชัยศรี	Phon Thong	โพนทอง	Roi Et	ร้อยเอ็ด	North-East
Non Chan	โนนจาน	Bua Lai	บัวลาย	Nakhon Ratchasima	นครราชสีมา	North-East
Non Charoen	โนนเจริญ	Ban Kruat	บ้านกรวด	Buriram	บุรีรัมย์	North-East
Non Daeng	โนนแดง	Non Daeng	โนนแดง	Nakhon Ratchasima	นครราชสีมา	North-East
Non Daeng	โนนแดง	Non Sila	โนนดินแดง	Khon Kaen	ขอนแก่น	North-East
Non Daeng	โนนแดง	Ban Khwao	บ้านเขว้า	Chaiyaphum	ชัยภูมิ	North-East
Non Daeng	โนนแดง	Borabue	บรบือ	Maha Sarakham	มหาสารคาม	North-East
Non Din Daeng	โนนดินแดง	Non Din Daeng	โนนดินแดง	Buriram	บุรีรัมย์	North-East
Non Don	โนนคอม	Phu Pha Man	ภูผาม่าน	Khon Kaen	ขอนแก่น	North-East
Non Han	โนนหัน	Chum Phae	ชุมแพ	Khon Kaen	ขอนแก่น	North-East
Non Hom	โนนห้อม	Mueang Prachinburi	เมืองปราจีนบุรี	Prachin Buri	ปราจีนบุรี	East
Non Hom	โนนหอม	Mueang Sakon Nakhon	เมืองสกลนคร	Sakon Nakhon	สกลนคร	North-East
Non Ka Len	โนนกาเล็น	Samrong	สำโรง	Ubon Ratchathani	อุบลราชธานี	North-East
Non Kalong	โนนกาหลง	Phibun Mangsahan	พิบูลมังสาหาร	Ubon Ratchathani	อุบลราชธานี	North-East
Non Kha	โนนข่า	Phon	พล	Khon Kaen	ขอนแก่น	North-East
Non Kha	โนนค่า	Sung Noen	สูงเนิน	Nakhon Ratchasima	นครราชสีมา	North-East
Non Khamin	โนนขมิ้น	Mueang Nongbua Lamphu	เมืองหนองบัวลำภู	Nong Bua Lamphu	หนองบัวลำภู	North-East
Non Kho	โนนค้อ	Non Khun	โนนคูน	Sisaket	ศรีสะเกษ	North-East
Non Kho	โนนค้อ	Buntharik	บุณฑริก	Ubon Ratchathani	อุบลราชธานี	North-East
Non Khong	โนนฆ้อง	Ban Fang	บ้านฝาง	Khon Kaen	ขอนแก่น	North-East
Non Khun	โนนคูณ	Khon San	คอนสาร	Chaiyaphum	ชัยภูมิ	North-East
Non Khun	โนนคูณ	Yang Chum Noi	ยางชุมน้อย	Sisaket	ศรีสะเกษ	North-East
Non Khwang	โนนขวาง	Ban Dan	บ้านด่าน	Buriram	บุรีรัมย์	North-East
Non Klang	โนนกลาง	Samrong	สำโรง	Ubon Ratchathani	อุบลราชธานี	North-East
Non Klang	โนนกลาง	Phibun Mangsahan	พิบูลมังสาหาร	Ubon Ratchathani	อุบลราชธานี	North-East
Non Ko	โนนก่อ	Sirindhorn	สิรินธร	Ubon Ratchathani	อุบลราชธานี	North-East
Non Kok	โนนกอก	Kaset Sombun	เกษตรสมบูรณ์	Chaiyaphum	ชัยภูมิ	North-East
Non Kung	โนนกุง	Trakan Phuet Phon	ตระการพืชผล	Ubon Ratchathani	อุบลราชธานี	North-East
Non Laem Thong	โนนแหลมทอง	Sahatsakhan	สหัสขันธ์	Kalasin	กาฬสินธุ์	North-East
Non Lek	โนนเหล็ก	Mueang Uthai Thani	เมืองอุทัยธานี	Uthai Thani	อุทัยธานี	Central
Non Mak Kheng	โนนหมากเค็ง	Watthana Nakhon	วัฒนานคร	Sa Kaeo	สระแก้ว	East
Non Mak Mun	โนนหมากมุ่น	Khok Sung	โคกสูง	Sa Kaeo	สระแก้ว	East
Non Muang	โนนม่วง	Si Bun Rueang	ศรีบุญเรือง	Nong Bua Lamphu	หนองบัวลำภู	North-East
Non Mueang	โนนเมือง	Kham Sakaesaeng	ขามสะแกแสง	Nakhon Ratchasima	นครราชสีมา	North-East
Non Mueang	โนนเมือง	Non Sang	โนนสัง	Nong Bua Lamphu	หนองบัวลำภู	North-East
Non Mueang	โนนเมือง	Na Klang	นากลาง	Nong Bua Lamphu	หนองบัวลำภู	North-East
Non Muaeng Phatthana	โนนเมืองพัฒนา	Dan Khun Thot	ด่านขุนทด	Nakhon Ratchasima	นครราชสีมา	North-East
Non Na Chan	โนนนาจาน	Na Khu	นาคู	Kalasin	กาฬสินธุ์	North-East
Non Nam Kliang	โนนน้ำเกลี้ยง	Sahatsakhan	สหัสขันธ์	Kalasin	กาฬสินธุ์	North-East
Non Nam Thaeng	โนนหนามแท่ง	Mueang Amnat Charoen	เมืองอำนาจเจริญ	Amnat Charoen	อำนาจเจริญ	North-East
Non Ngam	โนนงาม	Pathum Ratchawongsa	ปทุมราชวงศา	Amnat Charoen	อำนาจเจริญ	North-East
Non Non	โนนโหนน	Warin Chamrap	วารินชำราบ	Ubon Ratchathani	อุบลราชธานี	North-East
Non Pa Sang	โนนป่าซาง	Pha Khao	ผาขาว	Loei	เลย	North-East
Non Phayom	โนนพะยอม	Chonnabot	ชนบท	Khon Kaen	ขอนแก่น	North-East
Non Phek	โนนเพ็ก	Phayu	พยุห์	Sisaket	ศรีสะเกษ	North-East
Non Phet	โนนเพ็ด	Prathai	ประทาย	Nakhon Ratchasima	นครราชสีมา	North-East
Non Phi Ban	โนนภิบาล	Kae Dam	แกดำ	Maha Sarakham	มหาสารคาม	North-East
Non Phluang	โนนพลวง	Lan Krabue	ลานกระบือ	Kamphaeng Phet	กำแพงเพชร	Central
Non Pho	โนนโพธิ์	Mueang Amnat Charoen	เมืองอำนาจเจริญ	Amnat Charoen	อำนาจเจริญ	North-East
Non Phueng	โนนผึ้ง	Warin Chamrap	วารินชำราบ	Ubon Ratchathani	อุบลราชธานี	North-East
Non Po Daeng	โนนปอแดง	Pha Khao	ผาขาว	Loei	เลย	North-East
Non Pradu	โนนประดู่	Sida	สีดา	Nakhon Ratchasima	นครราชสีมา	North-East
Non Pun	โนนปูน	Phrai Bueng	ไพรบึง	Sisaket	ศรีสะเกษ	North-East
Non Rang	โนนรัง	Chum Phuang	ชุมพวง	Nakhon Ratchasima	นครราชสีมา	North-East
Non Rang	โนนรัง	Mueang Roi Et	เมืองร้อยเอ็ด	Roi Et	ร้อยเอ็ด	North-East
Non Rang	โนนรัง	Khueang Nai	เขื่องใน	Ubon Ratchathani	อุบลราชธานี	North-East
Non Rasi	โนนราษี	Borabue	บรบือ	Maha Sarakham	มหาสารคาม	North-East
Non Sa-at	โนนสะอาด	Non Sa-at	โนนสะอาด	Udon Thani	อุดรธานี	North-East
Non Sa-at	โนนสะอาด	Chum Phae	ชุมแพ	Khon Kaen	ขอนแก่น	North-East
Non Sa-at	โนนสะอาด	Khon Sawan	คอนสวรรค์	Chaiyaphum	ชัยภูมิ	North-East
Non Sa-at	โนนสะอาด	Waeng Yai	แวงใหญ่	Khon Kaen	ขอนแก่น	North-East
Non Sa-at	โนนสะอาด	Si Bun Rueang	ศรีบุญเรือง	Nong Bua Lamphu	หนองบัวลำภู	North-East
Non Sa-at	โนนสะอาด	Ban Muang	บ้านม่วง	Sakon Nakhon	สกลนคร	North-East
Non Sa-at	โนนสะอาด	Huai Mek	ห้วยเม็ก	Kalasin	กาฬสินธุ์	North-East
Non Sa-at	โนนสะอาด	Nong Ruea	หนองเรือ	Khon Kaen	ขอนแก่น	North-East
Non Sa-nga	โนนสง่า	Pathum Rat	ปทุมรัตต์	Roi Et	ร้อยเอ็ด	North-East
Non Samran	โนนสำราญ	Kantharalak	กันทรลักษ์	Sisaket	ศรีสะเกษ	North-East
Non Samran	โนนสำราญ	Mueang Chaiyaphum	เมืองชัยภูมิ	Chaiyaphum	ชัยภูมิ	North-East
Non Samran	โนนสำราญ	Kaeng Sanam Nang	แก้งสนามนาง	Nakhon Ratchasima	นครราชสีมา	North-East
Non Sang	โนนสัง	Non Sang	โนนสัง	Nong Bua Lamphu	หนองบัวลำภู	North-East
Non Sang	โนนสัง	Kanthararom	กันทรารมย์	Sisaket	ศรีสะเกษ	North-East
Non Sawan	โนนสวรรค์	Pathum Rat	ปทุมรัตต์	Roi Et	ร้อยเอ็ด	North-East
Non Sawan	โนนสวรรค์	Na Chaluai	นาจะหลวย	Ubon Ratchathani	อุบลราชธานี	North-East
Non Sawang	โนนสว่าง	Kaset Wisai	เกษตรวิสัย	Roi Et	ร้อยเอ็ด	North-East
Non Sawang	โนนสวาง	Kut Khaopun	กุดข้าวปุ้น	Ubon Ratchathani	อุบลราชธานี	North-East
Non Sila	โนนศิลา	Non Sila	โนนดินแดง	Khon Kaen	ขอนแก่น	North-East
Non Sila	โนนศิลา	Pak Khat	ปากคาด	Bueng Kan	บึงกาฬ	North-East
Non Sila	โนนศิลา	Sahatsakhan	สหัสขันธ์	Kalasin	กาฬสินธุ์	North-East
Non Sila Loeng	โนนศิลาเลิง	Khong Chai	ฆ้องชัย	Kalasin	กาฬสินธุ์	North-East
Non Sombun	โนนสมบูรณ์	Na Chaluai	นาจะหลวย	Ubon Ratchathani	อุบลราชธานี	North-East
Non Sombun	โนนสมบูรณ์	Det Udom	เดชอุดม	Ubon Ratchathani	อุบลราชธานี	North-East
Non Sombun	โนนสมบูรณ์	Soeng Sang	เสิงสาง	Nakhon Ratchasima	นครราชสีมา	North-East
Non Sombun	โนนสมบูรณ์	Ban Haet	บ้านแฮด	Khon Kaen	ขอนแก่น	North-East
Non Sombun	โนนสมบูรณ์	Mueang Bueng Kan	บึงกาฬ	Bueng Kan	บึงกาฬ	North-East
Non Sombun	โนนสมบูรณ์	Khao Suan Kwang	เขาสวนกวาง	Khon Kaen	ขอนแก่น	North-East
Non Sung	โนนสูง	Non Sung	โนนสูง	Nakhon Ratchasima	นครราชสีมา	North-East
Non Sung	โนนสูง	Yang Talat	ยางตลาด	Kalasin	กาฬสินธุ์	North-East
Non Sung	โนนสูง	Mueang Udon Thani	เมืองอุดรธานี	Udon Thani	อุดรธานี	North-East
Non Sung	โนนสูง	Khun Han	ขุนหาญ	Sisaket	ศรีสะเกษ	North-East
Non Suwan	โนนสุวรรณ	Non Suwan	โนนสุวรรณ	Buriram	บุรีรัมย์	North-East
Non Ta Then	โนนตาเถร	Non Daeng	โนนแดง	Nakhon Ratchasima	นครราชสีมา	North-East
Non Tan	โนนตาล	Tha Uthen	ท่าอุเทน	Nakhon Phanom	นครพนม	North-East
Non Tan	โนนตาล	Mueang Roi Et	เมืองร้อยเอ็ด	Roi Et	ร้อยเอ็ด	North-East
Non Teng	โนนเต็ง	Khong	คง	Nakhon Ratchasima	นครราชสีมา	North-East
Non Thai	โนนไทย	Non Thai	โนนไทย	Nakhon Ratchasima	นครราชสีมา	North-East
Non Than	โนนทัน	Mueang Nongbua Lamphu	เมืองหนองบัวลำภู	Nong Bua Lamphu	หนองบัวลำภู	North-East
Non Than	โนนทัน	Nong Ruea	หนองเรือ	Khon Kaen	ขอนแก่น	North-East
Non That	โนนธาตุ	Nong Song Hong	หนองสองห้อง	Khon Kaen	ขอนแก่น	North-East
Non Thon	โนนท่อน	Mueang Khon Kaen	เมืองขอนแก่น	Khon Kaen	ขอนแก่น	North-East
Non Thong	โนนทอง	Kaset Sombun	เกษตรสมบูรณ์	Chaiyaphum	ชัยภูมิ	North-East
Non Thong	โนนทอง	Waeng Yai	แวงใหญ่	Khon Kaen	ขอนแก่น	North-East
Non Thong	โนนทอง	Na Yung	นายูง	Udon Thani	อุดรธานี	North-East
Non Thong	โนนทอง	Ban Phue	บ้านผือ	Udon Thani	อุดรธานี	North-East
Non Thong	โนนทอง	Nong Ruea	หนองเรือ	Khon Kaen	ขอนแก่น	North-East
Non Thong In	โนนทองอินทร์	Ku Kaeo	กู่แก้ว	Udon Thani	อุดรธานี	North-East
Non Thonglang	โนนทองหลาง	Bua Yai	บัวใหญ่	Nakhon Ratchasima	นครราชสีมา	North-East
Non Tum	โนนตูม	Chum Phuang	ชุมพวง	Nakhon Ratchasima	นครราชสีมา	North-East
Non Udom	โนนอุดม	Mueang Yang	เมืองยาง	Nakhon Ratchasima	นครราชสีมา	North-East
Non Udom	โนนอุดม	Chum Phae	ชุมแพ	Khon Kaen	ขอนแก่น	North-East
Non Wai	โนนหวาย	Nong Wua So	หนองวัวซอ	Udon Thani	อุดรธานี	North-East
Non Yang	โนนยาง	Nong Sung	หนองสูง	Mukdahan	มุกดาหาร	North-East
Non Yo	โนนยอ	Chum Phuang	ชุมพวง	Nakhon Ratchasima	นครราชสีมา	North-East
Nong Bo	หนองบ่อ	Mueang Ubon Ratchathani	เมืองอุบลราชธานี	Ubon Ratchathani	อุบลราชธานี	North-East
Nong Bo	หนองบ่อ	Song Phi Nong	สองพี่น้อง	Suphan Buri	สุพรรณบุรี	Central
Nong Bo	หนองบ่อ	Yan Ta Khao	ย่านตาขาว	Trang	ตรัง	South
Nong Bo	หนองบ่อ	Na Kae	นาแก	Nakhon Phanom	นครพนม	North-East
Nong Bok	หนองบก	Lao Suea Kok	เหล่าเสือโก้ก	Ubon Ratchathani	อุบลราชธานี	North-East
Nong Bom Kluai	หนองบ่มกล้วย	Ban Rai	บ้านไร่	Uthai Thani	อุทัยธานี	Central
Nong Bon	หนองบอน	Khet Prawet	ประเวศ	Bangkok	กรุงเทพมหานคร	Central
Nong Bon	หนองบอน	Kosum Phisai	โกสุมพิสัย	Maha Sarakham	มหาสารคาม	North-East
Nong Bon	หนองบอน	Mueang Sa Kaeo	เมืองสระแก้ว	Sa Kaeo	สระแก้ว	East
Nong Bon	หนองบอน	Prakhon Chai	ประโคนชัย	Buriram	บุรีรัมย์	North-East
Nong Bon	หนองบอน	Bo Rai	บ่อไร่	Trat	ตราด	East
Nong Bon Daeng	หนองบอนแดง	Ban Bueng	บ้านบึง	Chonburi	ชลบุรี	East
Nong Bot	หนองโบสถ์	Nang Rong	นางรอง	Buriram	บุรีรัมย์	North-East
Nong Bua	หนองบัว	Si Nakhon	ศรีนคร	Sukhothai	สุโขทัย	Central
Nong Bua	หนองบัว	Sikhoraphum	ศีขรภูมิ	Surin	สุรินทร์	North-East
Nong Bua	หนองบัว	Phu Ruea	ภูเรือ	Loei	เลย	North-East
Nong Bua	หนองบัว	Ban Fang	บ้านฝาง	Khon Kaen	ขอนแก่น	North-East
Nong Bua	หนองบัว	Mueang Nongbua Lamphu	เมืองหนองบัวลำภู	Nong Bua Lamphu	หนองบัวลำภู	North-East
Nong Bua	หนองบัว	Nong Bua	หนองบัว	Nakhon Sawan	นครสวรรค์	Central
Nong Bua	หนองบัว	Ban Pho	บ้านโพธิ์	Chachoengsao	ฉะเชิงเทรา	East
Nong Bua	หนองบัว	Mueang Chanthaburi	เมืองจันทบุรี	Chanthaburi	จันทบุรี	East
Nong Bua	หนองบัว	Kanthararom	กันทรารมย์	Sisaket	ศรีสะเกษ	North-East
Nong Bua	หนองบัว	Phayakkhaphum Phisai	พยัคฆภูมิพิสัย	Maha Sarakham	มหาสารคาม	North-East
Nong Bua	หนองบัว	Nong Kung Si	หนองกุงศรี	Kalasin	กาฬสินธุ์	North-East
Nong Bua	หนองบัว	Dong Luang	ดงหลวง	Mukdahan	มุกดาหาร	North-East
Nong Bua	หนองบัว	Pakham	ปะคำ	Buriram	บุรีรัมย์	North-East
Nong Bua	หนองบัว	Nikhom Nam Un	นิคมน้ำอูน	Sakon Nakhon	สกลนคร	North-East
Nong Bua	หนองบัว	Ratsada	รัษฎา	Trang	ตรัง	South
Nong Bua	หนองบัว	Chai Prakan	ปราการ	Chiang Mai	เชียงใหม่	North
Nong Bua	หนองบัว	Wat Sing	วัดสิงห์	Chai Nat	ชัยนาท	Central
Nong Bua	หนองบัว	Mueang Udon Thani	เมืองอุดรธานี	Udon Thani	อุดรธานี	North-East
Nong Bua	หนองบัว	Na Mon	นามน	Kalasin	กาฬสินธุ์	North-East
Nong Bua	หนองบัว	Ban Phaeo	บ้านแพ้ว	Samut Sakhon	สมุทรสาคร	Central
Nong Bua	หนองบัว	Ban Khai	บ้านค่าย	Rayong	ระยอง	East
Nong Bua	หนองบัว	Mueang Kanchanaburi	เมืองกาญจนบุรี	Kanchanaburi	กาญจนบุรี	West
Nong Bua	หนองบัว	Khong	คง	Nakhon Ratchasima	นครราชสีมา	North-East
Nong Bua	หนองบัว	Phatthana Nikhom	พัฒนานิคม	Lopburi	ลพบุรี	Central
Nong Bua	หนองบัว	Tha Tum	ท่าตูม	Surin	สุรินทร์	North-East
Nong Bua	หนองบัว	At Samat	อาจสามารถ	Roi Et	ร้อยเอ็ด	North-East
Nong Bua	หนองบัว	Kosum Phisai	โกสุมพิสัย	Maha Sarakham	มหาสารคาม	North-East
Nong Bua	หนองบัว	Ban Mo	บ้านหมอ	Saraburi	สระบุรี	Central
Nong Bua Ban	หนองบัวบาน	Chatturat	จัตุรัส	Chaiyaphum	ชัยภูมิ	North-East
Nong Bua Ban	หนองบัวบาน	Rattanaburi	รัตนบุรี	Surin	สุรินทร์	North-East
Nong Bua Ban	หนองบัวบาน	Nong Wua So	หนองวัวซอ	Udon Thani	อุดรธานี	North-East
Nong Bua Daeng	หนองบัวแดง	Nong Bua Daeng	หนองบัวแดง	Chaiyaphum	ชัยภูมิ	North-East
Nong Bua Dong	หนองบัวดง	Sila Lat	ศิลาลาด	Sisaket	ศรีสะเกษ	North-East
Nong Bua Hi	หนองบัวฮี	Phibun Mangsahan	พิบูลมังสาหาร	Ubon Ratchathani	อุบลราชธานี	North-East
Nong Bua Kaeo	หนองบัวแก้ว	Phayakkhaphum Phisai	พยัคฆภูมิพิสัย	Maha Sarakham	มหาสารคาม	North-East
Nong Bua Khok	หนองบัวโคก	Chatturat	จัตุรัส	Chaiyaphum	ชัยภูมิ	North-East
Nong Bua Khok	หนองบัวโคก	Lam Plai Mat	ลำปลายมาศ	Buriram	บุรีรัมย์	North-East
Nong Bua Lakhon	หนองบัวละคร	Dan Khun Thot	ด่านขุนทด	Nakhon Ratchasima	นครราชสีมา	North-East
Nong Bua Noi	หนองบัวน้อย	Sikhio	สีคิ้ว	Nakhon Ratchasima	นครราชสีมา	North-East
Nong Bua Nuea	หนองบัวเหนือ	Mueang Tak	เมืองตาก	Tak	ตาก	West
Nong Bua Rawe	หนองบัวระเหว	Nong Bua Rawe	หนองบัวระเหว	Chaiyaphum	ชัยภูมิ	North-East
Nong Bua Sa-at	หนองบัวสะอาด	Bua Yai	บัวใหญ่	Nakhon Ratchasima	นครราชสีมา	North-East
Nong Bua Sala	หนองบัวศาลา	Mueang Nakhon Ratchasima	เมืองนครราชสีมา	Nakhon Ratchasima	นครราชสีมา	North-East
Nong Bua Santu	หนองบัวสันตุ	Yang Sisurat	ยางสีสุราช	Maha Sarakham	มหาสารคาม	North-East
Nong Bua Sim	หนองบัวสิม	Kham Ta Kla	คำตากล้า	Sakon Nakhon	สกลนคร	North-East
Nong Bua Tai	หนองบัวใต้	Mueang Tak	เมืองตาก	Tak	ตาก	West
Nong Bua Tai	หนองบัวใต้	Si Bun Rueang	ศรีบุญเรือง	Nong Bua Lamphu	หนองบัวลำภู	North-East
Nong Bua Takiat	หนองบัวตะเกียด	Dan Khun Thot	ด่านขุนทด	Nakhon Ratchasima	นครราชสีมา	North-East
Nong Bua Thong	หนองบัวทอง	Rattanaburi	รัตนบุรี	Surin	สุรินทร์	North-East
Nong Bua Yai	หนองบัวใหญ่	Chatturat	จัตุรัส	Chaiyaphum	ชัยภูมิ	North-East
Nong Bunnak	หนองบุนนาก	Nong Bun Mak	หนองบุญมาก	Nakhon Ratchasima	นครราชสีมา	North-East
Nong Chabok	หนองจะบก	Mueang Nakhon Ratchasima	เมืองนครราชสีมา	Nakhon Ratchasima	นครราชสีมา	North-East
Nong Chaeng Yai	หนองแจ้งใหญ่	Bua Yai	บัวใหญ่	Nakhon Ratchasima	นครราชสีมา	North-East
Nong Chaeng	หนองแจง	Bueng Sam Phan	บึงสามพัน	Phetchabun	เพชรบูรณ์	Central
Nong Chai Si	หนองชัยศรี	Nong Hong	หนองหงส์	Buriram	บุรีรัมย์	North-East
Nong Chak	หนองชาก	Ban Bueng	บ้านบึง	Chonburi	ชลบุรี	East
Nong Chalong	หนองฉลอง	Khukhan	ขุขันธ์	Sisaket	ศรีสะเกษ	North-East
Nong Chang Khuen	หนองช้างคืน	Mueang Lamphun	เมืองลำพูน	Lamphun	ลำพูน	North
Nong Chang Laen	หนองช้างแล่น	Huai Yot	ห้วยยอด	Trang	ตรัง	South
Nong Chang Yai	หนองช้างใหญ่	Muang Sam Sip	ม่วงสามสิบ	Ubon Ratchathani	อุบลราชธานี	North-East
Nong Chang	หนองฉาง	Nong Chang	หนองฉาง	Uthai Thani	อุทัยธานี	Central
Nong Chang	หนองช้าง	Sam Chai	สามชัย	Kalasin	กาฬสินธุ์	North-East
Nong Chiang Thun	หนองเชียงทูน	Prang Ku	ปรางค์กู่	Sisaket	ศรีสะเกษ	North-East
Nong Chik	หนองจิก	Borabue	บรบือ	Maha Sarakham	มหาสารคาม	North-East
Nong Chik	หนองจิก	Nong Khae	หนองแค	Saraburi	สระบุรี	Central
Nong Chik	หนองจิก	Khiri Mat	คีรีมาศ	Sukhothai	สุโขทัย	Central
Nong Chim	หนองฉิม	Noen Sa-nga	เนินสง่า	Chaiyaphum	ชัยภูมิ	North-East
Nong Chim	หนองชิ่ม	Laem Sing	แหลมสิงห์	Chanthaburi	จันทบุรี	East
Nong Chok	หนองจอก	Khet Nong Chok	หนองจอก	Bangkok	กรุงเทพมหานคร	Central
Nong Chok	หนองจอก	Tha Yang	ท่ายาง	Phetchaburi	เพชรบุรี	West
Nong Chok	หนองจอก	Bang Pakong	บางปะกง	Chachoengsao	ฉะเชิงเทรา	East
Nong Chok	หนองจอก	Ban Rai	บ้านไร่	Uthai Thani	อุทัยธานี	Central
Nong Chom	หนองจ๊อม	San Sai	สันทราย	Chiang Mai	เชียงใหม่	North
Nong Chorakhe	หนองจรเข้	Nong Khae	หนองแค	Saraburi	สระบุรี	Central
Nong Chumphon	หนองชุมพล	Khao Yoi	เขาย้อย	Phetchaburi	เพชรบุรี	West
Nong Chumphon Nuea	หนองชุมพลเหนือ	Khao Yoi	เขาย้อย	Phetchaburi	เพชรบุรี	West
Nong Daeng	หนองแดง	Na Chueak	นาเชือก	Maha Sarakham	มหาสารคาม	North-East
Nong Daeng	หนองแดง	Si Chomphu	สีชมพู	Khon Kaen	ขอนแก่น	North-East
Nong Din Daeng	หนองดินแดง	Mueang Nakhon Pathom	เมืองนครปฐม	Nakhon Phanom	นครพนม	North-East
Nong Doen	หนองเดิ่น	Bung Khla	บุ่งคล้า	Bueng Kan	บึงกาฬ	North-East
Nong Don	หนองโดน	Nong Don	หนองโดน	Saraburi	สระบุรี	Central
Nong Don	หนองโดน	Lam Plai Mat	ลำปลายมาศ	Buriram	บุรีรัมย์	North-East
Nong Don	หนองโดน	Chatturat	จัตุรัส	Chaiyaphum	ชัยภูมิ	North-East
Nong Faek	หนองแฝก	Saraphi	สารภี	Chiang Mai	เชียงใหม่	North
Nong Fai	หนองฝ้าย	Lao Khwan	เลาขวัญ	Kanchanaburi	กาญจนบุรี	West
Nong Ha	หนองฮะ	Samrong Thap	สำโรงทาบ	Surin	สุรินทร์	North-East
Nong Hai	หนองไฮ	Wapi Pathum	วาปีปทุม	Maha Sarakham	มหาสารคาม	North-East
Nong Hai	หนองไฮ	Mueang Udon Thani	เมืองอุดรธานี	Udon Thani	อุดรธานี	North-East
Nong Hai	หนองไฮ	Mueang Sisaket	เมืองศรีสะเกษ	Sisaket	ศรีสะเกษ	North-East
Nong Hai	หนองไฮ	Samrong	สำโรง	Ubon Ratchathani	อุบลราชธานี	North-East
Nong Hai	หนองไฮ	Senangkhanikhom	เสนางคนิคม	Amnat Charoen	อำนาจเจริญ	North-East
Nong Hai	หนองไฮ	Uthumphon Phisai	อุทุมพรพิสัย	Sisaket	ศรีสะเกษ	North-East
Nong Han	หนองหาร	San Sai	สันทราย	Chiang Mai	เชียงใหม่	North
Nong Han	หนองหาน	Nong Han	หนองหาน	Udon Thani	อุดรธานี	North-East
Nong Hang	หนองห้าง	Uthumphon Phisai	อุทุมพรพิสัย	Sisaket	ศรีสะเกษ	North-East
Nong Hang	หนองห้าง	Kuchinarai	กุฉินารายณ์	Kalasin	กาฬสินธุ์	North-East
Nong Hang	หนองฮาง	Muang Sam Sip	ม่วงสามสิบ	Ubon Ratchathani	อุบลราชธานี	North-East
Nong Hi	หนองฮี	Nong Hi	หนองฮี	Roi Et	ร้อยเอ็ด	North-East
Nong Hi	หนองฮี	Pla Pak	ปลาปาก	Nakhon Phanom	นครพนม	North-East
Nong Hiang	หนองเหียง	Phanat Nikhom	พนัสนิคม	Chonburi	ชลบุรี	East
Nong Hin	หนองหิน	Mueang Suang	เมืองสรวง	Roi Et	ร้อยเอ็ด	North-East
Nong Hin	หนองหิน	Rong Kham	ร่องคำ	Kalasin	กาฬสินธุ์	North-East
Nong Hin	หนองหิน	Nong Hin	หนองหิน	Loei	เลย	North-East
Nong Hoi	หนองหอย	Mueang Chiang Mai	เมืองเชียงใหม่	Chiang Mai	เชียงใหม่	North
Nong Hoi	หนองหอย	Phra Thong Kham	พระทองคำ	Nakhon Ratchasima	นครราชสีมา	North-East
Nong Hong	หนองหงษ์	Phan Thong	พานทอง	Chonburi	ชลบุรี	East
Nong Hong	หนองหงส์	Thung Song	ทุ่งสง	Nakhon Si Thammarat	นครศรีธรรมราช	South
Nong Hua Chang	หนองหัวช้าง	Kanthararom	กันทรารมย์	Sisaket	ศรีสะเกษ	North-East
Nong Hua Chang	หนองหัวช้าง	Phon Charoen	พรเจริญ	Bueng Kan	บึงกาฬ	North-East
Nong Hua Fan	หนองหัวฟาน	Kham Sakaesaeng	ขามสะแกแสง	Nakhon Ratchasima	นครราชสีมา	North-East
Nong Hua Khu	หนองหัวคู	Ban Phue	บ้านผือ	Udon Thani	อุดรธานี	North-East
Nong Hua Pho	หนองหัวโพ	Nong Saeng	หนองแซง	Saraburi	สระบุรี	Central
Nong Hua Raet	หนองหัวแรต	Nong Bun Mak	หนองบุญมาก	Nakhon Ratchasima	นครราชสีมา	North-East
Nong Hua Wua	หนองหัววัว	Phran Kratai	พรานกระต่าย	Kamphaeng Phet	กำแพงเพชร	Central
Nong I But	หนองอีบุตร	Huai Phueng	ห้วยผึ้ง	Kalasin	กาฬสินธุ์	North-East
Nong I Thao	หนองอิเฒ่า	Yang Talat	ยางตลาด	Kalasin	กาฬสินธุ์	North-East
Nong I Yo	หนองอียอ	Sanom	สนม	Surin	สุรินทร์	North-East
Nong Ian	หนองเอี่ยน	Khamcha-i	คำชะอี	Mukdahan	มุกดาหาร	North-East
Nong Irun	หนองอิรุณ	Ban Bueng	บ้านบึง	Chonburi	ชลบุรี	East
Nong Kae	หนองแก	Phra Phutthabat	พระพุทธบาท	Saraburi	สระบุรี	Central
Nong Kae	หนองแก	Si Bun Rueang	ศรีบุญเรือง	Nong Bua Lamphu	หนองบัวลำภู	North-East
Nong Kae	หนองแก	Mueang Uthai Thani	เมืองอุทัยธานี	Uthai Thani	อุทัยธานี	Central
Nong Kaeo	หนองแก้ว	Hua Taphan	หัวตะพาน	Amnat Charoen	อำนาจเจริญ	North-East
Nong Kaeo	หนองแก้ว	Mueang Roi Et	เมืองร้อยเอ็ด	Roi Et	ร้อยเอ็ด	North-East
Nong Kaeo	หนองแก๋ว	Hang Dong	หางดง	Chiang Mai	เชียงใหม่	North
Nong Kaeo	หนองแก้ว	Mueang Sisaket	เมืองศรีสะเกษ	Sisaket	ศรีสะเกษ	North-East
Nong Kaeo	หนองแก้ว	Kanthararom	กันทรารมย์	Sisaket	ศรีสะเกษ	North-East
Nong Kaeo	หนองแก้ว	Prachantakham	ประจันตคาม	Prachin Buri	ปราจีนบุรี	East
Nong Kakha	หนองกะขะ	Phan Thong	พานทอง	Chonburi	ชลบุรี	East
Nong Kapu	หนองกะปุ	Ban Lat	บ้านลาด	Phetchaburi	เพชรบุรี	West
Nong Kathao	หนองกะท้าว	Nakhon Thai	นครไทย	Phitsanulok	พิษณุโลก	Central
Nong Kathing	หนองกะทิง	Lam Plai Mat	ลำปลายมาศ	Buriram	บุรีรัมย์	North-East
Nong Kha	หนองข่า	Pathum Ratchawongsa	ปทุมราชวงศา	Amnat Charoen	อำนาจเจริญ	North-East
Nong Kha	หนองข่า	Kaset Sombun	เกษตรสมบูรณ์	Chaiyaphum	ชัยภูมิ	North-East
Nong Kha	หนองค้า	Phayu	พยุห์	Sisaket	ศรีสะเกษ	North-East
Nong Khae	หนองแก	Hua Hin	หัวหิน	Prachuap Khiri Khan	ประจวบคีรีขันธ์	West
Nong Khae	หนองแค	Nong Khae	หนองแค	Saraburi	สระบุรี	Central
Nong Khae	หนองแค	Rasi Salai	ราษีไศล	Sisaket	ศรีสะเกษ	North-East
Nong Khaem	หนองแขม	Khet Nong Khaem	หนองแขม	Bangkok	กรุงเทพมหานคร	Central
Nong Khaem	หนองแขม	Nong Khae	หนองแค	Saraburi	สระบุรี	Central
Nong Khaem	หนองแขม	Khok Samrong	โคกสำโรง	Lopburi	ลพบุรี	Central
Nong Khaem	หนองแขม	Phrom Phiram	พรหมพิราม	Phitsanulok	พิษณุโลก	Central
Nong Khaen	หนองแคน	Pathum Rat	ปทุมรัตต์	Roi Et	ร้อยเอ็ด	North-East
Nong Khaen	หนองแคน	Dong Luang	ดงหลวง	Mukdahan	มุกดาหาร	North-East
Nong Khai	หนองค่าย	Prathai	ประทาย	Nakhon Ratchasima	นครราชสีมา	North-East
Nong Khai Nam	หนองไข่น้ำ	Mueang Nakhon Ratchasima	เมืองนครราชสีมา	Nakhon Ratchasima	นครราชสีมา	North-East
Nong Khai Nam	หนองไข่น้ำ	Nong Khae	หนองแค	Saraburi	สระบุรี	Central
Nong Khai Nok	หนองไข่นก	Muang Sam Sip	ม่วงสามสิบ	Ubon Ratchathani	อุบลราชธานี	North-East
Nong Kham	หนองขาม	Kaeng Khro	แก้งคร้อ	Chaiyaphum	ชัยภูมิ	North-East
Nong Kham	หนองขาม	Chakkarat	จักราช	Nakhon Ratchasima	นครราชสีมา	North-East
Nong Kham	หนองขาม	Nong Ya Sai	หนองหญ้าไซ	Suphan Buri	สุพรรณบุรี	Central
Nong Kham	หนองขาม	At Samat	อาจสามารถ	Roi Et	ร้อยเอ็ด	North-East
Nong Kham	หนองขาม	Khon Sawan	คอนสวรรค์	Chaiyaphum	ชัยภูมิ	North-East
Nong Khaman	หนองขมาร	Khu Mueang	คูเมือง	Buriram	บุรีรัมย์	North-East
Nong Khan	หนองคัน	Phu Luang	ภูหลวง	Loei	เลย	North-East
Nong Khan Song	หนองคันทรง	Mueang Trat	เมืองตราด	Trat	ตราด	East
Nong Khanak	หนองขนาก	Tha Ruea	ท่าเรือ	Phra Nakhon Si Ayutthaya	พระนครศรีอยุธยา	Central
Nong Khanan	หนองขนาน	Mueang Phetchaburi	เมืองเพชรบุรี	Phetchaburi	เพชรบุรี	West
Nong Khang Khok	หนองข้างคอก	Mueang Chonburi	เมืองชลบุรี	Chonburi	ชลบุรี	East
Nong Khang Phlu	หนองค้างพลู	Khet Nong Khaem	หนองแขม	Bangkok	กรุงเทพมหานคร	Central
Nong Khao	หนองขาว	Tha Muang	ท่าม่วง	Kanchanaburi	กาญจนบุรี	West
Nong Khayang	หนองขาหย่าง	Nong Khayang	หนองขาหย่าง	Uthai Thani	อุทัยธานี	Central
Nong Khayat	หนองขยาด	Phanat Nikhom	พนัสนิคม	Chonburi	ชลบุรี	East
Nong Kheng	หนองเข็ง	Mueang Bueng Kan	เมืองบึงกาฬ	Bueng Kan	บึงกาฬ	North-East
Nong Khiat	หนองเขียด	Chum Phae	ชุมแพ	Khon Kaen	ขอนแก่น	North-East
Nong Khla	หนองคล้า	Sai Ngam	ไทรงาม	Kamphaeng Phet	กำแพงเพชร	Central
Nong Khon	หนองขอน	Mueang Ubon Ratchathani	เมืองอุบลราชธานี	Ubon Ratchathani	อุบลราชธานี	North-East
Nong Khon Kwang	หนองขอนกว้าง	Mueang Udon Thani	เมืองอุดรธานี	Udon Thani	อุดรธานี	North-East
Nong Khon Thai	หนองคอนไทย	Phu Khiao	ภูเขียว	Chaiyaphum	ชัยภูมิ	North-East
Nong Khrok	หนองครก	Mueang Sisaket	เมืองศรีสะเกษ	Sisaket	ศรีสะเกษ	North-East
Nong Khu	นาคูหนองคู	Na Dun	นาดูน	Maha Sarakham	มหาสารคาม	North-East
Nong Khu	หนองคู	Lam Plai Mat	ลำปลายมาศ	Buriram	บุรีรัมย์	North-East
Nong Khu	หนองคู	Ban Thaen	บ้านแท่น	Chaiyaphum	ชัยภูมิ	North-East
Nong Khu Khat	หนองคูขาด	Borabue	บรบือ	Maha Sarakham	มหาสารคาม	North-East
Nong Khun	หนองขุ่น	Wat Sing	วัดสิงห์	Chai Nat	ชัยนาท	Central
Nong Khun Yai	หนองขุ่นใหญ่	Nong Phok	หนองพอก	Roi Et	ร้อยเอ็ด	North-East
Nong Khwai	หนองไขว่	Lom Sak	หล่มสัก	Phetchabun	เพชรบูรณ์	Central
Nong Khwai	หนองควาย	Hang Dong	หางดง	Chiang Mai	เชียงใหม่	North
Nong Khwai So	หนองควายโซ	Nong Saeng	หนองแซง	Saraburi	สระบุรี	Central
Nong Khwao	หนองขวาว	Sikhoraphum	ศีขรภูมิ	Surin	สุรินทร์	North-East
Nong Ki	หนองกี่	Kabin Buri	กบินทร์บุรี	Prachin Buri	ปราจีนบุรี	East
Nong Ki	หนองกี่หนองกี่	Nong Ki	หนองกี่	Buriram	บุรีรัมย์	North-East
Nong Kin Phen	หนองกินเพล	Warin Chamrap	วารินชำราบ	Ubon Ratchathani	อุบลราชธานี	North-East
Nong Klang Dong	หนองกลางดง	Thap Than	ทัพทัน	Uthai Thani	อุทัยธานี	Central
Nong Klang Na	หนองกลางนา	Mueang Ratchaburi	เมืองราชบุรี	Ratchaburi	ราชบุรี	West
Nong Klap	หนองกลับ	Sawankhalok	สวรรคโลก	Sukhothai	สุโขทัย	Central
Nong Klap	หนองกลับ	Nong Bua	หนองบัว	Nakhon Sawan	นครสวรรค์	Central
Nong Ko	หนองโก	Kranuan	กระนวน	Khon Kaen	ขอนแก่น	North-East
Nong Ko	หนองโก	Borabue	บรบือ	Maha Sarakham	มหาสารคาม	North-East
Nong Kom Ko	หนองกอมเกาะ	Mueang Nong Khai	เมืองหนองคาย	Nong Khai	หนองคาย	North-East
Nong Kong	หนองกง	Nang Rong	นางรอง	Buriram	บุรีรัมย์	North-East
Nong Kop	หนองกบ	Ban Pong	บ้านโป่ง	Ratchaburi	ราชบุรี	West
Nong Kop	หนองกบ	Nong Saeng	หนองแซง	Saraburi	สระบุรี	Central
Nong Krabian	หนองกระเบียน	Ban Mi	บ้านหมี่	Lopburi	ลพบุรี	Central
Nong Krachao	หนองกระเจา	Chum Saeng	ชุมแสง	Nakhon Sawan	นครสวรรค์	Central
Nong Krachet	หนองกระเจ็ด	Ban Lat	บ้านลาด	Phetchaburi	เพชรบุรี	West
Nong Krading	หนองกระดิ่ง	Khiri Mat	คีรีมาศ	Sukhothai	สุโขทัย	Central
Nong Kradon	หนองกระโดน	Mueang Nakhon Sawan	เมืองนครสวรรค์	Nakhon Sawan	นครสวรรค์	Central
Nong Krang	หนองกร่าง	Bo Phloi	บ่อพลอย	Kanchanaburi	กาญจนบุรี	West
Nong Krat	หนองกราด	Dan Khun Thot	ด่านขุนทด	Nakhon Ratchasima	นครราชสีมา	North-East
Nong Krathum	หนองกระทุ่ม	Mueang Nakhon Ratchasima	เมืองนครราชสีมา	Nakhon Ratchasima	นครราชสีมา	North-East
Nong Krathum	หนองกระทุ่ม	Kamphaeng Saen	กำแพงแสน	Nakhon Pathom	นครปฐม	Central
Nong Krathum	หนองกระทุ่ม	Doem Bang Nang Buat	เดิมบางนางบวช	Suphan Buri	สุพรรณบุรี	Central
Nong Krathum	หนองกระทุ่ม	Pak Tho	ปากท่อ	Ratchaburi	ราชบุรี	West
Nong Krathum	หนองกระทุ่ม	Khai Bang Rachan	ค่ายบางระจัน	Sing Buri	สิงห์บุรี	Central
Nong Krathum	หนองกระทุ่ม	Thap Than	ทัพทัน	Uthai Thani	อุทัยธานี	Central
Nong Krot	หนองกรด	Banphot Phisai	บรรพตพิสัย	Nakhon Sawan	นครสวรรค์	Central
Nong Krot	หนองกรด	Mueang Nakhon Sawan	เมืองนครสวรรค์	Nakhon Sawan	นครสวรรค์	Central
Nong Kula	หนองกุลา	Bang Rakam	บางระกำ	Phitsanulok	พิษณุโลก	Central
Nong Kum	หนองกุ่ม	Bo Phloi	บ่อพลอย	Kanchanaburi	กาญจนบุรี	West
Nong Kung	หนองกุง	Mueang Kalasin	เมืองกาฬสินธุ์	Kalasin	กาฬสินธุ์	North-East
Nong Kung	หนองกุง	Nam Phong	น้ำพอง	Khon Kaen	ขอนแก่น	North-East
Nong Kung	หนองกุง	Chuen Chom	ชื่นชม	Maha Sarakham	มหาสารคาม	North-East
Nong Kung	หนองกุง	Kae Dam	แกดำ	Maha Sarakham	มหาสารคาม	North-East
Nong Kung	หนองกุง	Non Khun	โนนคูน	Sisaket	ศรีสะเกษ	North-East
Nong Kung	หนองกุง	Tan Sum	ตาลสุม	Ubon Ratchathani	อุบลราชธานี	North-East
Nong Kung	หนองกุง	Na Chueak	นาเชือก	Maha Sarakham	มหาสารคาม	North-East
Nong Kung Kaeo	หนองกุงแก้ว	Si Bun Rueang	ศรีบุญเรือง	Nong Bua Lamphu	หนองบัวลำภู	North-East
Nong Kung Sawan	หนองกุงสวรรค์	Kosum Phisai	โกสุมพิสัย	Maha Sarakham	มหาสารคาม	North-East
Nong Kung Si	หนองกุงศรี	Non Sa-at	โนนสะอาด	Udon Thani	อุดรธานี	North-East
Nong Kung Si	หนองกุงศรี	Nong Kung Si	หนองกุงศรี	Kalasin	กาฬสินธุ์	North-East
Nong Kung Soen	หนองกุงเซิน	Phu Wiang	ภูเวียง	Khon Kaen	ขอนแก่น	North-East
Nong Kung Thanasan	หนองกุงธนสาร	Phu Wiang	ภูเวียง	Khon Kaen	ขอนแก่น	North-East
Nong Kung Thap Ma	หนองกุงทับม้า	Wang Sam Mo	วังสามหมอ	Udon Thani	อุดรธานี	North-East
Nong Kung Yai	หนองกุงใหญ่	Kranuan	กระนวน	Khon Kaen	ขอนแก่น	North-East
Nong Kwang	หนองกวั่ง	Ban Muang	บ้านม่วง	Sakon Nakhon	สกลนคร	North-East
Nong Kwang	หนองกวาง	Photharam	โพธาราม	Ratchaburi	ราชบุรี	West
Nong Lak	หนองหลัก	Chum Phuang	ชุมพวง	Nakhon Ratchasima	นครราชสีมา	North-East
Nong Lak	หนองหลัก	Chai Wan	ไชยวาน	Udon Thani	อุดรธานี	North-East
Nong Lalok	หนองละลอก	Ban Khai	บ้านค่าย	Rayong	ระยอง	East
Nong Lan	หนองลาน	Tha Maka	ท่ามะกา	Kanchanaburi	กาญจนบุรี	West
Nong Lao	หนองเหล่า	Khueang Nai	เขื่องใน	Ubon Ratchathani	อุบลราชธานี	North-East
Nong Lao	หนองเหล่า	Muang Sam Sip	ม่วงสามสิบ	Ubon Ratchathani	อุบลราชธานี	North-East
Nong Lat	หนองลาด	Mueang Sakon Nakhon	เมืองสกลนคร	Sakon Nakhon	สกลนคร	North-East
Nong Lat	หนองลาด	Waritchaphum	วาริชภูมิ	Sakon Nakhon	สกลนคร	North-East
Nong Lek	หนองเหล็ก	Kosum Phisai	โกสุมพิสัย	Maha Sarakham	มหาสารคาม	North-East
Nong Lek	หนองเหล็ก	Sikhoraphum	ศีขรภูมิ	Surin	สุรินทร์	North-East
Nong Loeng	หนองเลิง	Mueang Bueng Kan	บึงกาฬ	Bueng Kan	บึงกาฬ	North-East
Nong Lom	หนองหล่ม	Hang Chat	ห้างฉัตร	Lampang	ลำปาง	North
Nong Lom	หนองหล่ม	Dok Khamtai	ดอกคำใต้	Phayao	พะเยา	North
Nong Long	หนองล่อง	Wiang Nong Long	เวียงหนองล่อง	Lamphun	ลำพูน	North
Nong Lu	หนองลู	Sangkhla Buri	สังขละบุรี	Kanchanaburi	กาญจนบุรี	West
Nong Luang	หนองหลวง	Non Narai	โนนนารายณ์	Surin	สุรินทร์	North-East
Nong Luang	หนองหลวง	Tha Tako	ท่าตะโก	Nakhon Sawan	นครสวรรค์	Central
Nong Luang	หนองหลวง	Sawang Daen Din	สว่างแดนดิน	Sakon Nakhon	สกลนคร	North-East
Nong Luang	หนองหลวง	Selaphum	เสลภูมิ	Roi Et	ร้อยเอ็ด	North-East
Nong Luang	หนองหลวง	Mueang Tak	เมืองตาก	Tak	ตาก	West
Nong Luang	หนองหลวง	Sawang Arom	สว่างอารมณ์	Uthai Thani	อุทัยธานี	Central
Nong Luang	หนองหลวง	Umphang	อุ้มผาง	Tak	ตาก	West
Nong Luang	หนองหลวง	Lan Krabue	ลานกระบือ	Kamphaeng Phet	กำแพงเพชร	Central
Nong Luang	หนองหลวง	Fao Rai	เฝ้าไร่	Nong Khai	หนองคาย	North-East
Nong Lum	หนองหลุม	Wachirabarami	วชิรบารมี	Phichit	พิจิตร	Central
Nong Ma	หนองม้า	Pho Si Suwan	โพธิ์ศรีสุวรรณ	Sisaket	ศรีสะเกษ	North-East
Nong Mae Kai	หนองแม่ไก่	Pho Thong	โพธิ์ทอง	Ang Thong	อ่างทอง	Central
Nong Mae Na	หนองแม่นา	Khao Kho	เขาค้อ	Phetchabun	เพชรบูรณ์	Central
Nong Mae Taeng	หนองแม่แตง	Sai Ngam	ไทรงาม	Kamphaeng Phet	กำแพงเพชร	Central
Nong Mai Daeng	หนองไม้แดง	Mueang Chonburi	เมืองชลบุรี	Chonburi	ชลบุรี	East
Nong Mai Kaen	หนองไม้แก่น	Plaeng Yao	แปลงยาว	Chachoengsao	ฉะเชิงเทรา	East
Nong Mai Kong	หนองไม้กอง	Sai Ngam	ไทรงาม	Kamphaeng Phet	กำแพงเพชร	Central
Nong Mai Ngam	หนองไม้งาม	Ban Kruat	บ้านกรวด	Buriram	บุรีรัมย์	North-East
Nong Mai Phai	หนองไม้ไผ่	Nong Bun Mak	หนองบุญมาก	Nakhon Ratchasima	นครราชสีมา	North-East
Nong Mai Sung	หนองไม้ซุง	Uthai	อุทัย	Phra Nakhon Si Ayutthaya	พระนครศรีอยุธยา	Central
Nong Mak Fai	หนองหมากฝ้าย	Watthana Nakhon	วัฒนานคร	Sa Kaeo	สระแก้ว	East
Nong Makha	หนองมะค่า	Khok Charoen	โคกเจริญ	Lopburi	ลพบุรี	Central
Nong Makha Mong	หนองมะค่าโมง	Dan Chang	ด่านช้าง	Suphan Buri	สุพรรณบุรี	Central
Nong Makhuea	หนองมะเขือ	Phon	พล	Khon Kaen	ขอนแก่น	North-East
Nong Mamong	หนองมะโมง	Nong Mamong	หนองมะโมง	Chai Nat	ชัยนาท	Central
Nong Manao	หนองมะนาว	Khong	คง	Nakhon Ratchasima	นครราชสีมา	North-East
Nong Masaeo	หนองมะแซว	Mueang Amnat Charoen	เมืองอำนาจเจริญ	Amnat Charoen	อำนาจเจริญ	North-East
Nong Mek	หนองเม็ก	Nong Han	หนองหาน	Udon Thani	อุดรธานี	North-East
Nong Mek	หนองเม็ก	Nong Song Hong	หนองสองห้อง	Khon Kaen	ขอนแก่น	North-East
Nong Mek	หนองเม็ก	Na Chueak	นาเชือก	Maha Sarakham	มหาสารคาม	North-East
Nong Methi	หนองเมธี	Tha Tum	ท่าตูม	Surin	สุรินทร์	North-East
Nong Mi	หนองหมี	Rasi Salai	ราษีไศล	Sisaket	ศรีสะเกษ	North-East
Nong Mo	หนองหม้อ	Takhli	ตาคลี	Nakhon Sawan	นครสวรรค์	Central
Nong Mu	หนองหมู	Wihan Daeng	วิหารแดง	Saraburi	สระบุรี	Central
Nong Muang	หนองม่วง	Nong Muang	หนองม่วง	Lopburi	ลพบุรี	Central
Nong Muang	หนองม่วง	Khok Sung	โคกสูง	Sa Kaeo	สระแก้ว	East
Nong Muang	หนองม่วง	Borabue	บรบือ	Maha Sarakham	มหาสารคาม	North-East
Nong Mueang	หนองเมือง	Ban Mi	บ้านหมี่	Lopburi	ลพบุรี	Central
Nong Mueang	หนองเมือง	Muang Sam Sip	ม่วงสามสิบ	Ubon Ratchathani	อุบลราชธานี	North-East
Nong Muang Khai	หนองม่วงไข่	Nong Muang Khai	หนองม่วงไข่	Phrae	แพร่	North
Nong Muen Than	หนองหมื่นถ่าน	At Samat	อาจสามารถ	Roi Et	ร้อยเอ็ด	North-East
Nong Na Kham	หนองนาคำ	Mueang Udon Thani	เมืองอุดรธานี	Udon Thani	อุดรธานี	North-East
Nong Na Saeng	หนองนาแซง	Mueang Chaiyaphum	เมืองชัยภูมิ	Chaiyaphum	ชัยภูมิ	North-East
Nong Nae	หนองแหน	Phanom Sarakham	พนมสารคาม	Chachoengsao	ฉะเชิงเทรา	East
Nong Nak	หนองนาก	Nong Khae	หนองแค	Saraburi	สระบุรี	Central
Nong Nam	หนองหนาม	Mueang Lamphun	เมืองลำพูน	Lamphun	ลำพูน	North
Nong Nam Daeng	หนองน้ำแดง	Pak Chong	ปากช่อง	Nakhon Ratchasima	นครราชสีมา	North-East
Nong Nam Sai	หนองน้ำใส	Ban Phai	บ้านไผ่	Khon Kaen	ขอนแก่น	North-East
Nong Nam Sai	หนองน้ำใส	Phachi	ภาชี	Phra Nakhon Si Ayutthaya	พระนครศรีอยุธยา	Central
Nong Nam Sai	หนองน้ำใส	Watthana Nakhon	วัฒนานคร	Sa Kaeo	สระแก้ว	East
Nong Nam Sai	หนองน้ำใส	Sikhio	สีคิ้ว	Nakhon Ratchasima	นครราชสีมา	North-East
Nong Nam Som	หนองน้ำส้ม	Uthai	อุทัย	Phra Nakhon Si Ayutthaya	พระนครศรีอยุธยา	Central
Nong Nam Yai	หนองน้ำใหญ่	Phak Hai	ผักไห่	Phra Nakhon Si Ayutthaya	พระนครศรีอยุธยา	Central
Nong Nang Nuan	หนองนางนวล	Nong Chang	หนองฉาง	Uthai Thani	อุทัยธานี	Central
Nong Nang	หนองนาง	Tha Bo	ท่าบ่อ	Nong Khai	หนองคาย	North-East
Nong Ngio	หนองงิ้ว	Wang Saphung	วังสะพุง	Loei	เลย	North-East
Nong Ngu Lueam	หนองงูเหลือม	Mueang Nakhon Pathom	เมืองนครปฐม	Nakhon Phanom	นครพนม	North-East
Nong Ngu Lueam	หนองงูเหลือม	Chaloem Phra Kiat	เฉลิมพระเกียรติ	Nakhon Ratchasima	นครราชสีมา	North-East
Nong No	หนองโน	Mueang Maha Sarakham	เมืองมหาสารคาม	Maha Sarakham	มหาสารคาม	North-East
Nong No	หนองโน	Kranuan	กระนวน	Khon Kaen	ขอนแก่น	North-East
Nong No	หนองโน	Mueang Saraburi	เมืองสระบุรี	Saraburi	สระบุรี	Central
Nong Noi	หนองน้อย	Wat Sing	วัดสิงห์	Chai Nat	ชัยนาท	Central
Nong Nok Kaeo	หนองนกแก้ว	Lao Khwan	เลาขวัญ	Kanchanaburi	กาญจนบุรี	West
Nong Nok Khai	หนองนกไข่	Krathum Baen	กระทุ่มแบน	Samut Sakhon	สมุทรสาคร	Central
Nong Nok Khian	หนองนกเขียน	Si That	ศรีธาตุ	Udon Thani	อุดรธานี	North-East
Nong Nok Tha	หนองนกทา	Khemarat	เขมราฐ	Ubon Ratchathani	อุบลราชธานี	North-East
Nong Nom Wua	หนองนมวัว	Lat Yao	ลาดยาว	Nakhon Sawan	นครสวรรค์	Central
Nong O	หนองอ้อ	Nong Wua So	หนองวัวซอ	Udon Thani	อุดรธานี	North-East
Nong O	หนองอ้อ	Ban Pong	บ้านโป่ง	Ratchaburi	ราชบุรี	West
Nong O	หนองอ้อ	Si Satchanalai	ศรีสัชนาลัย	Sukhothai	สุโขทัย	Central
Nong Om	หนองอ้ม	Thung Si Udom	ทุ่งศรีอุดม	Ubon Ratchathani	อุบลราชธานี	North-East
Nong Ong	หนองโอ่ง	U Thong	อู่ทอง	Suphan Buri	สุพรรณบุรี	Central
Nong Pa Khrang	หนองป่าครั่ง	Mueang Chiang Mai	เมืองเชียงใหม่	Chiang Mai	เชียงใหม่	North
Nong Pa Ko	หนองป่าก่อ	Doi Luang	ดอยหลวง	Chiang Rai	เชียงราย	North
Nong Paen	หนองแปน	Mancha Khiri	มัญจาคีรี	Khon Kaen	ขอนแก่น	North-East
Nong Paen	หนองแปน	Charoen Sin	เจริญศิลป์	Sakon Nakhon	สกลนคร	North-East
Nong Paen	หนองแปน	Phon Na Kaeo	โพนนาแก้ว	Sakon Nakhon	สกลนคร	North-East
Nong Paen	หนองแปน	Kamalasai	กมลาไสย	Kalasin	กาฬสินธุ์	North-East
Nong Pak Long	หนองปากโลง	Mueang Nakhon Pathom	เมืองนครปฐม	Nakhon Phanom	นครพนม	North-East
Nong Pet	หนองเป็ด	Si Sawat	ศรีสวัสดิ์	Kanchanaburi	กาญจนบุรี	West
Nong Phai	หนองไผ่	Kaeng Khro	แก้งคร้อ	Chaiyaphum	ชัยภูมิ	North-East
Nong Phai	หนองไผ่	Nong Phai	หนองไผ่	Phetchabun	เพชรบูรณ์	Central
Nong Phai	หนองไผ่	Mueang Chaiyaphum	เมืองชัยภูมิ	Chaiyaphum	ชัยภูมิ	North-East
Nong Phai	หนองไผ่	Nong Han	หนองหาน	Udon Thani	อุดรธานี	North-East
Nong Phai	หนองไผ่	Na Dun	นาดูน	Maha Sarakham	มหาสารคาม	North-East
Nong Phai	หนองไผ่	Nong Khayang	หนองขาหย่าง	Uthai Thani	อุทัยธานี	Central
Nong Phai	หนองไผ่	Mueang Udon Thani	เมืองอุดรธานี	Udon Thani	อุดรธานี	North-East
Nong Phai	หนองไผ่	Mueang Sisaket	เมืองศรีสะเกษ	Sisaket	ศรีสะเกษ	North-East
Nong Phai	หนองไผ่	Thawat Buri	ธวัชบุรี	Roi Et	ร้อยเอ็ด	North-East
Nong Phai	หนองไผ่	Dan Makham Tia	ด่านมะขามเตี้ย	Kanchanaburi	กาญจนบุรี	West
Nong Phai	หนองไผ่	Chum Phae	ชุมแพ	Khon Kaen	ขอนแก่น	North-East
Nong Phai Baen	หนองไผ่แบน	Mueang Uthai Thani	เมืองอุทัยธานี	Uthai Thani	อุทัยธานี	Central
Nong Phai Kaeo	หนองไผ่แก้ว	Ban Bueng	บ้านบึง	Chonburi	ชลบุรี	East
Nong Phai Lom	หนองไผ่ล้อม	Mueang Nakhon Ratchasima	เมืองนครราชสีมา	Nakhon Ratchasima	นครราชสีมา	North-East
Nong Phai Lom	หนองไผ่ล้อม	Nong Song Hong	หนองสองห้อง	Khon Kaen	ขอนแก่น	North-East
Nong Phai Lom	หนองไผ่ล้อม	Samrong Thap	สำโรงทาบ	Surin	สุรินทร์	North-East
Nong Phai Sun	หนองภัยศูนย์	Mueang Nongbua Lamphu	เมืองหนองบัวลำภู	Nong Bua Lamphu	หนองบัวลำภู	North-East
Nong Phak Nak	หนองผักนาก	Sam Chuk	สามชุก	Suphan Buri	สุพรรณบุรี	Central
Nong Phak Waen	หนองผักแว่น	Tha Luang	ท่าหลวง	Lopburi	ลพบุรี	Central
Nong Phan Chan	หนองพันจันทร์	Ban Kha	บ้านคา	Ratchaburi	ราชบุรี	West
Nong Phan Tha	หนองพันทา	So Phisai	โซ่พิสัย	Bueng Kan	บึงกาฬ	North-East
Nong Phang Kha	หนองพังค่า	Mueang Uthai Thani	เมืองอุทัยธานี	Uthai Thani	อุทัยธานี	Central
Nong Phayom	หนองพยอม	Taphan Hin	ตะพานหิน	Phichit	พิจิตร	Central
Nong Phikun	หนองพิกุล	Tak Fa	ตากฟ้า	Nakhon Sawan	นครสวรรค์	Central
Nong Phlap	หนองพลับ	Mueang Phetchaburi	เมืองเพชรบุรี	Phetchaburi	เพชรบุรี	West
Nong Phluang	หนองพลวง	Chakkarat	จักราช	Nakhon Ratchasima	นครราชสีมา	North-East
Nong Phluang	หนองพลวง	Prathai	ประทาย	Nakhon Ratchasima	นครราชสีมา	North-East
Nong Pho	หนองโพ	Photharam	โพธาราม	Ratchaburi	ราชบุรี	West
Nong Pho	หนองโพ	Takhli	ตาคลี	Nakhon Sawan	นครสวรรค์	Central
Nong Pho	หนองโพธิ์	Nong Ya Sai	หนองหญ้าไซ	Suphan Buri	สุพรรณบุรี	Central
Nong Pho	หนองโพธิ์	Wang Yang	วังยาง	Nakhon Phanom	นครพนม	North-East
Nong Pho	หนองโพธิ์	Na Chueak	นาเชือก	Maha Sarakham	มหาสารคาม	North-East
Nong Phok	หนองพอก	Nong Phok	หนองพอก	Roi Et	ร้อยเอ็ด	North-East
Nong Phok	หนองพอก	Thawat Buri	ธวัชบุรี	Roi Et	ร้อยเอ็ด	North-East
Nong Phon Ngam	หนองโพนงาม	Kaset Sombun	เกษตรสมบูรณ์	Chaiyaphum	ชัยภูมิ	North-East
Nong Phra	หนองพระ	Wang Sai Phun	วังทรายพูน	Phichit	พิจิตร	Central
Nong Phra	หนองพระ	Wang Thong	วังทอง	Phitsanulok	พิษณุโลก	Central
Nong Phrao Ngai	หนองเพรางาย	Sai Noi	ไทรน้อย	Nonthaburi	นนทบุรี	Central
Nong Phrong	หนองโพรง	Si Maha Phot	ศรีมหาโพธิ	Prachin Buri	ปราจีนบุรี	East
Nong Phue	หนองผือ	Mueang Suang	เมืองสรวง	Roi Et	ร้อยเอ็ด	North-East
Nong Phue	หนองผือ	Tha Li	ท่าลี่	Loei	เลย	North-East
Nong Phue	หนองผือ	Chaturaphak Phiman	จตุรพักตรพิมาน	Roi Et	ร้อยเอ็ด	North-East
Nong Phue	หนองผือ	Khao Wong	เขาวง	Kalasin	กาฬสินธุ์	North-East
Nong Phue	หนองผือ	Khemarat	เขมราฐ	Ubon Ratchathani	อุบลราชธานี	North-East
Nong Phueng	หนองผึ้ง	Saraphi	สารภี	Chiang Mai	เชียงใหม่	North
Nong Pla Lai	หนองปลาไหล	Mueang Saraburi	เมืองสระบุรี	Saraburi	สระบุรี	Central
Nong Pla Lai	หนองปลาไหล	Nong Prue	หนองปรือ	Kanchanaburi	กาญจนบุรี	West
Nong Pla Lai	หนองปลาไหล	Wang Sai Phun	วังทรายพูน	Phichit	พิจิตร	Central
Nong Pla Lai	หนองปลาไหล	Bang Lamung	บางละมุง	Chonburi	ชลบุรี	East
Nong Pla Lai	หนองปลาไหล	Khao Yoi	เขาย้อย	Phetchaburi	เพชรบุรี	West
Nong Pla Mo	หนองปลาหมอ	Ban Pong	บ้านโป่ง	Ratchaburi	ราชบุรี	West
Nong Pla Mo	หนองปลาหมอ	Nong Khae	หนองแค	Saraburi	สระบุรี	Central
Nong Pla Mo	หนองปลาหมอ	Non Sila	โนนดินแดง	Khon Kaen	ขอนแก่น	North-East
Nong Pla Pak	หนองปลาปาก	Si Chiang Mai	ศรีเชียงใหม่	Nong Khai	หนองคาย	North-East
Nong Pla Sawai	หนองปลาสะวาย	Ban Hong	บ้านโฮ่ง	Lamphun	ลำพูน	North
Nong Pling	หนองปลิง	Mueang Kamphaeng Phet	เมืองกำแพงเพชร	Kamphaeng Phet	กำแพงเพชร	Central
Nong Pling	หนองปลิง	Mueang Maha Sarakham	เมืองมหาสารคาม	Maha Sarakham	มหาสารคาม	North-East
Nong Pling	หนองปลิง	Mueang Nakhon Sawan	เมืองนครสวรรค์	Nakhon Sawan	นครสวรรค์	Central
Nong Pling	หนองปลิง	Nong Khae	หนองแค	Saraburi	สระบุรี	Central
Nong Pling	หนองปลิง	Nikhom Nam Un	นิคมน้ำอูน	Sakon Nakhon	สกลนคร	North-East
Nong Pling	หนองปลิง	Lao Khwan	เลาขวัญ	Kanchanaburi	กาญจนบุรี	West
Nong Pling	หนองปลิง	Nakhon Luang	นครหลวง	Phra Nakhon Si Ayutthaya	พระนครศรีอยุธยา	Central
Nong Plong	หนองปล่อง	Chamni	ชำนิ	Buriram	บุรีรัมย์	North-East
Nong Plong	หนองปล้อง	Wang Sai Phun	วังทรายพูน	Phichit	พิจิตร	Central
Nong Pradu	หนองประดู่	Lao Khwan	เลาขวัญ	Kanchanaburi	กาญจนบุรี	West
Nong Prong	หนองปรง	Khao Yoi	เขาย้อย	Phetchaburi	เพชรบุรี	West
Nong Prue	หนองปรือ	Phanat Nikhom	พนัสนิคม	Chonburi	ชลบุรี	East
Nong Prue	หนองปรือ	Bang Lamung	บางละมุง	Chonburi	ชลบุรี	East
Nong Prue	หนองปรือ	Ratsada	รัษฎา	Trang	ตรัง	South
Nong Prue	หนองปรือ	Bang Phli	บางพลี	Samut Prakan	สมุทรปราการ	Central
Nong Prue	หนองปรือ	Nong Prue	หนองปรือ	Kanchanaburi	กาญจนบุรี	West
Nong Raet	หนองแรด	Thoeng	เทิง	Chiang Rai	เชียงราย	North
Nong Raet	หนองแรต	Yaring (Malay: Jamu)	ยะหริ่ง	Pattani	ปัตตานี	South
Nong Rai	หนองไร่	Pluak Daeng	ปลวกแดง	Rayong	ระยอง	East
Nong Rakhang	หนองระฆัง	Sanom	สนม	Surin	สุรินทร์	North-East
Nong Rathawat	หนองราชวัตร	Nong Ya Sai	หนองหญ้าไซ	Suphan Buri	สุพรรณบุรี	Central
Nong Rawiang	หนองระเวียง	Mueang Nakhon Ratchasima	เมืองนครราชสีมา	Nakhon Ratchasima	นครราชสีมา	North-East
Nong Rawiang	หนองระเวียง	Phimai	พิมาย	Nakhon Ratchasima	นครราชสีมา	North-East
Nong Ri	หนองรี	Bo Phloi	บ่อพลอย	Kanchanaburi	กาญจนบุรี	West
Nong Ri	หนองรี	Lam Sonthi	ลำสนธิ	Lopburi	ลพบุรี	Central
Nong Ri	หนองรี	Mueang Chonburi	เมืองชลบุรี	Chonburi	ชลบุรี	East
Nong Rong	หนองโรง	Nong Khae	หนองแค	Saraburi	สระบุรี	Central
Nong Rong	หนองโรง	Phanom Thuan	พนมทวน	Kanchanaburi	กาญจนบุรี	West
Nong Ruea	หนองเรือ	Non Sang	โนนสัง	Nong Bua Lamphu	หนองบัวลำภู	North-East
Nong Ruea	หนองเรือ	Chumphon Buri	ชุมพลบุรี	Surin	สุรินทร์	North-East
Nong Ruea	หนองเรือ	Nong Ruea	หนองเรือ	Khon Kaen	ขอนแก่น	North-East
Nong Ruea	หนองเรือ	Na Chueak	นาเชือก	Maha Sarakham	มหาสารคาม	North-East
Nong Sa	หนองสระ	Thap Than	ทัพทัน	Uthai Thani	อุทัยธานี	Central
Nong Sa Pla	หนองสระปลา	Nong Han	หนองหาน	Udon Thani	อุดรธานี	North-East
Nong Sadao	หนองสะเดา	Sam Chuk	สามชุก	Suphan Buri	สุพรรณบุรี	Central
Nong Saen	หนองแสน	Wapi Pathum	วาปีปทุม	Maha Sarakham	มหาสารคาม	North-East
Nong Saeng	หนองแซง	Nong Saeng	หนองแซง	Saraburi	สระบุรี	Central
Nong Saeng	หนองแซง	Ban Haet	บ้านแฮด	Khon Kaen	ขอนแก่น	North-East
Nong Saeng	หนองแซง	Hankha	หันคา	Chai Nat	ชัยนาท	Central
Nong Saeng	หนองแสง	Wapi Pathum	วาปีปทุม	Maha Sarakham	มหาสารคาม	North-East
Nong Saeng	หนองแสง	Nong Saeng	หนองแสง	Udon Thani	อุดรธานี	North-East
Nong Saeng	หนองแสง	Mueang Nakhon Phanom	เมืองนครพนม	Nakhon Phanom	นครพนม	North-East
Nong Saeng	หนองแสง	Prachantakham	ประจันตคาม	Prachin Buri	ปราจีนบุรี	East
Nong Saeng	หนองแสง	Pak Phli	ปากพลี	Nakhon Nayok	นครนายก	Central
Nong Saeng Yai	หนองแสงใหญ่	Khong Chiam	โขงเจียม	Ubon Ratchathani	อุบลราชธานี	North-East
Nong Sai	หนองไทร	Nang Rong	นางรอง	Buriram	บุรีรัมย์	North-East
Nong Sai	หนองไทร	Phunphin	พุนพิน	Surat Thani	สุราษฎร์ธานี	South
Nong Sai	หนองไทร	Dan Khun Thot	ด่านขุนทด	Nakhon Ratchasima	นครราชสีมา	North-East
Nong Sai Khao	หนองทรายขาว	Ban Mi	บ้านหมี่	Lopburi	ลพบุรี	Central
Nong Sala	หนองศาลา	Cha-am	ชะอำ	Phetchaburi	เพชรบุรี	West
Nong Sam Si	หนองสามสี	Senangkhanikhom	เสนางคนิคม	Amnat Charoen	อำนาจเจริญ	North-East
Nong Sam Wang	หนองสามวัง	Nong Suea	หนองเสือ	Pathum Thani	ปทุมธานี	Central
Nong Samet	หนองเสม็ด	Mueang Trat	เมืองตราด	Trat	ตราด	East
Nong Samsak	หนองซ้ำซาก	Ban Bueng	บ้านบึง	Chonburi	ชลบุรี	East
Nong Sang	หนองสังข์	Aranyaprathet	อรัญประเทศ	Sa Kaeo	สระแก้ว	East
Nong Sang	หนองสังข์	Na Kae	นาแก	Nakhon Phanom	นครพนม	North-East
Nong Sang	หนองสังข์	Kaeng Khro	แก้งคร้อ	Chaiyaphum	ชัยภูมิ	North-East
Nong Sanit	หนองสนิท	Chom Phra	จอมพระ	Surin	สุรินทร์	North-East
Nong Sano	หนองสะโน	Buntharik	บุณฑริก	Ubon Ratchathani	อุบลราชธานี	North-East
Nong Sano	หนองโสน	Lao Khwan	เลาขวัญ	Kanchanaburi	กาญจนบุรี	West
Nong Sano	หนองโสน	Nang Rong	นางรอง	Buriram	บุรีรัมย์	North-East
Nong Sano	หนองโสน	Mueang Trat	เมืองตราด	Trat	ตราด	East
Nong Sano	หนองโสน	Mueang Phetchaburi	เมืองเพชรบุรี	Phetchaburi	เพชรบุรี	West
Nong Sano	หนองโสน	Sam Ngam	สามง่าม	Phichit	พิจิตร	Central
Nong Sanom	หนองสนม	Wanon Niwat	วานรนิวาส	Sakon Nakhon	สกลนคร	North-East
Nong Sao Lao	หนองเสาเล้า	Chum Phae	ชุมแพ	Khon Kaen	ขอนแก่น	North-East
Nong Sarai	หนองสาหร่าย	Phanom Thuan	พนมทวน	Kanchanaburi	กาญจนบุรี	West
Nong Sarai	หนองสาหร่าย	Don Chedi	ดอนเจดีย์	Suphan Buri	สุพรรณบุรี	Central
Nong Sarai	หนองสาหร่าย	Pak Chong	ปากช่อง	Nakhon Ratchasima	นครราชสีมา	North-East
Nong Sawan	หนองสวรรค์	Mueang Nongbua Lamphu	เมืองหนองบัวลำภู	Nong Bua Lamphu	หนองบัวลำภู	North-East
Nong Sawan	หนองสว่าง	Lom Sak	หล่มสัก	Phetchabun	เพชรบูรณ์	Central
Nong Sida	หนองสีดา	Nong Saeng	หนองแซง	Saraburi	สระบุรี	Central
Nong Sim	หนองสิม	Khemarat	เขมราฐ	Ubon Ratchathani	อุบลราชธานี	North-East
Nong Sim	หนองสิม	Borabue	บรบือ	Maha Sarakham	มหาสารคาม	North-East
Nong Son	หนองซน	Na Thom	นาทม	Nakhon Phanom	นครพนม	North-East
Nong Son	หนองซอน	Chiang Yuen	เชียงยืน	Maha Sarakham	มหาสารคาม	North-East
Nong Song Hong	หนองสองห้อง	Ban Phaeo	บ้านแพ้ว	Samut Sakhon	สมุทรสาคร	Central
Nong Song Hong	หนองสองห้อง	Nong Song Hong	หนองสองห้อง	Khon Kaen	ขอนแก่น	North-East
Nong Suang	หนองสรวง	Kham Thale So	ขามทะเลสอ	Nakhon Ratchasima	นครราชสีมา	North-East
Nong Suang	หนองสรวง	Nong Kung Si	หนองกุงศรี	Kalasin	กาฬสินธุ์	North-East
Nong Suang	หนองสรวง	Nong Chang	หนองฉาง	Uthai Thani	อุทัยธานี	Central
Nong Suang	หนองสรวง	Wihan Daeng	วิหารแดง	Saraburi	สระบุรี	Central
Nong Suea Chang	หนองเสือช้าง	Nong Yai	หนองใหญ่	Chonburi	ชลบุรี	East
Nong Sung	หนองสูง	Nong Sung	หนองสูง	Mukdahan	มุกดาหาร	North-East
Nong Sung Nuea	หนองสูงเหนือ	Nong Sung	หนองสูง	Mukdahan	มุกดาหาร	North-East
Nong Sung Tai	หนองสูงใต้	Nong Sung	หนองสูง	Mukdahan	มุกดาหาร	North-East
Nong Ta Kai	หนองตาไก้	Pho Chai	โพธิ์ชัย	Roi Et	ร้อยเอ็ด	North-East
Nong Ta Khong	หนองตาคง	Pong Nam Ron	โป่งน้ำร้อน	Chanthaburi	จันทบุรี	East
Nong Ta Ngu	หนองตางู	Banphot Phisai	บรรพตพิสัย	Nakhon Sawan	นครสวรรค์	Central
Nong Ta Taem	หนองตาแต้ม	Pran Buri	ปราณบุรี	Prachuap Khiri Khan	ประจวบคีรีขันธ์	West
Nong Tak Ya	หนองตากยา	Tha Muang	ท่าม่วง	Kanchanaburi	กาญจนบุรี	West
Nong Takai	หนองตะไก้	Sung Noen	สูงเนิน	Nakhon Ratchasima	นครราชสีมา	North-East
Nong Takai	หนองตะไก้	Nong Bun Mak	หนองบุญมาก	Nakhon Ratchasima	นครราชสีมา	North-East
Nong Takhian Bon	หนองตะเคียนบอน	Watthana Nakhon	วัฒนานคร	Sa Kaeo	สระแก้ว	East
Nong Takhrong	หนองตะครอง	Lahan Sai	ละหานทราย	Buriram	บุรีรัมย์	North-East
Nong Tamlueng	หนองตำลึง	Phan Thong	พานทอง	Chonburi	ชลบุรี	East
Nong Tao	หนองเต่า	Mueang Uthai Thani	เมืองอุทัยธานี	Uthai Thani	อุทัยธานี	Central
Nong Tao	หนองเต่า	Trakan Phuet Phon	ตระการพืชผล	Ubon Ratchathani	อุบลราชธานี	North-East
Nong Tao	หนองเต่า	Kao Liao	เก้าเลี้ยว	Nakhon Sawan	นครสวรรค์	Central
Nong Tao	หนองเต่า	Ban Mi	บ้านหมี่	Lopburi	ลพบุรี	Central
Nong Taphan	หนองตะพาน	Ban Khai	บ้านค่าย	Rayong	ระยอง	East
Nong Tat	หนองตาด	Mueang Buriram	เมืองบุรีรัมย์	Buriram	บุรีรัมย์	North-East
Nong Tat Yai	หนองตาดใหญ่	Sida	สีดา	Nakhon Ratchasima	นครราชสีมา	North-East
Nong Teng	หนองเต็ง	Krasang	กระสัง	Buriram	บุรีรัมย์	North-East
Nong Thale	หนองทะเล	Mueang Krabi	เมืองกระบี่	Krabi	กระบี่	South
Nong Than Nam	หนองทันน้ำ	Kut Khaopun	กุดข้าวปุ้น	Ubon Ratchathani	อุบลราชธานี	North-East
Nong Thao	หนองเทา	Tha Uthen	ท่าอุเทน	Nakhon Phanom	นครพนม	North-East
Nong Thao Yai	หนองเทาใหญ่	Pla Pak	ปลาปาก	Nakhon Phanom	นครพนม	North-East
Nong Thap Thai	หนองทัพไทย	Phanom Phrai	พนมไพร	Roi Et	ร้อยเอ็ด	North-East
Nong Thep	หนองเทพ	Non Narai	โนนนารายณ์	Surin	สุรินทร์	North-East
Nong Thong	หนองทอง	Sai Ngam	ไทรงาม	Kamphaeng Phet	กำแพงเพชร	Central
Nong Thong	หนองธง	Pa Bon	ป่าบอน	Phatthalung	พัทลุง	South
Nong Thum	หนองทุ่ม	Seka	เซกา	Bueng Kan	บึงกาฬ	North-East
Nong Thum	หนองทุ่ม	Wapi Pathum	วาปีปทุม	Maha Sarakham	มหาสารคาม	North-East
Nong Tin Nok	หนองตีนนก	Ban Pho	บ้านโพธิ์	Chachoengsao	ฉะเชิงเทรา	East
Nong Tok Paen	หนองตอกแป้น	Yang Talat	ยางตลาด	Kalasin	กาฬสินธุ์	North-East
Nong Tong	หนองตอง	Hang Dong	หางดง	Chiang Mai	เชียงใหม่	North
Nong Trut	หนองตรุด	Mueang Trang	เมืองตรัง	Trang	ตรัง	South
Nong Tum	หนองตูม	Kong Krailat	กงไกรลาศ	Sukhothai	สุโขทัย	Central
Nong Tum	หนองตูม	Mueang Khon Kaen	เมืองขอนแก่น	Khon Kaen	ขอนแก่น	North-East
Nong Tum	หนองตูม	Phu Khiao	ภูเขียว	Chaiyaphum	ชัยภูมิ	North-East
Nong Ueng	หนองอึ่ง	Rasi Salai	ราษีไศล	Sisaket	ศรีสะเกษ	North-East
Nong Wa	หนองหว้า	Mueang Nongbua Lamphu	เมืองหนองบัวลำภู	Nong Bua Lamphu	หนองบัวลำภู	North-East
Nong Wa	หนองหว้า	Kumphawapi	กุมภวาปี	Udon Thani	อุดรธานี	North-East
Nong Wa	หนองหว้า	Khao Chakan	เขาฉกรรจ์	Sa Kaeo	สระแก้ว	East
Nong Wa	หนองหว้า	Bua Lai	บัวลาย	Nakhon Ratchasima	นครราชสีมา	North-East
Nong Waeng	หนองแวง	Ban Mai Chaiyaphot	บ้านใหม่ไชยพจน์	Buriram	บุรีรัมย์	North-East
Nong Waeng	หนองแวง	Ban Phue	บ้านผือ	Udon Thani	อุดรธานี	North-East
Nong Waeng	หนองแวง	Mueang Roi Et	เมืองร้อยเอ็ด	Roi Et	ร้อยเอ็ด	North-East
Nong Waeng	หนองแวง	Thepharak	เทพารักษ์	Nakhon Ratchasima	นครราชสีมา	North-East
Nong Waeng	หนองแวง	Somdet	สมเด็จ	Kalasin	กาฬสินธุ์	North-East
Nong Waeng	หนองแวง	Nikhom Kham Soi	นิคมคำสร้อย	Mukdahan	มุกดาหาร	North-East
Nong Waeng	หนองแวง	Khok Sung	โคกสูง	Sa Kaeo	สระแก้ว	East
Nong Waeng	หนองแวง	Si Narong	ศรีณรงค์	Surin	สุรินทร์	North-East
Nong Waeng	หนองแวง	Kut Rang	กุดรัง	Maha Sarakham	มหาสารคาม	North-East
Nong Waeng	หนองแวง	Ban Phaeng	บ้านแพง	Nakhon Phanom	นครพนม	North-East
Nong Waeng	หนองแวง	Phra Yuen	พระยืน	Khon Kaen	ขอนแก่น	North-East
Nong Waeng	หนองแวง	Kanthararom	กันทรารมย์	Sisaket	ศรีสะเกษ	North-East
Nong Waeng	หนองแวง	Nam Som	น้ำโสม	Udon Thani	อุดรธานี	North-East
Nong Waeng	หนองแวง	Nong Bua Daeng	หนองบัวแดง	Chaiyaphum	ชัยภูมิ	North-East
Nong Waeng	หนองแวง	Lahan Sai	ละหานทราย	Buriram	บุรีรัมย์	North-East
Nong Waeng	หนองแวง	Kaset Wisai	เกษตรวิสัย	Roi Et	ร้อยเอ็ด	North-East
Nong Waeng	หนองแวง	Wanon Niwat	วานรนิวาส	Sakon Nakhon	สกลนคร	North-East
Nong Waeng	หนองแวง	Watthana Nakhon	วัฒนานคร	Sa Kaeo	สระแก้ว	East
Nong Waeng Khuang	หนองแวงควง	Si Somdet	ศรีสมเด็จ	Roi Et	ร้อยเอ็ด	North-East
Nong Waeng Nang Bao	หนองแวงนางเบ้า	Phon	พล	Khon Kaen	ขอนแก่น	North-East
Nong Waeng Sok Phra	หนองแวงโสกพระ	Phon	พล	Khon Kaen	ขอนแก่น	North-East
Nong Waeng Tai	หนองแวงใต้	Wanon Niwat	วานรนิวาส	Sakon Nakhon	สกลนคร	North-East
Nong Wua So	หนองวัวซอ	Nong Wua So	หนองวัวซอ	Udon Thani	อุดรธานี	North-East
Nong Ya	หนองหญ้า	Mueang Kanchanaburi	เมืองกาญจนบุรี	Kanchanaburi	กาญจนบุรี	West
Nong Ya Khao	หนองหญ้าขาว	Sikhio	สีคิ้ว	Nakhon Ratchasima	นครราชสีมา	North-East
Nong Ya Lat	หนองหญ้าลาด	Kantharalak	กันทรลักษ์	Sisaket	ศรีสะเกษ	North-East
Nong Ya Plong	หนองหญ้าปล้อง	Nong Ya Plong	หนองหญ้าปล้อง	Phetchaburi	เพชรบุรี	West
Nong Ya Plong	หนองหญ้าปล้อง	Wang Saphung	วังสะพุง	Loei	เลย	North-East
Nong Ya Plong	หนองหญ้าปล้อง	Thap Than	ทัพทัน	Uthai Thani	อุทัยธานี	Central
Nong Ya Plong	หนองหญ้าปล้อง	Ban Dan Lan Hoi	บ้านด่านลานหอย	Sukhothai	สุโขทัย	Central
Nong Ya Sai	หนองหญ้าไซ	Nong Ya Sai	หนองหญ้าไซ	Suphan Buri	สุพรรณบุรี	Central
Nong Ya Sai	หนองหญ้าไซ	Wang Sam Mo	วังสามหมอ	Udon Thani	อุดรธานี	North-East
Nong Ya Sai	หนองหญ้าไทร	Sak Lek	สากเหล็ก	Phichit	พิจิตร	Central
Nong Yaeng	หนองแหย่ง	San Sai	สันทราย	Chiang Mai	เชียงใหม่	North
Nong Yai	หนองใหญ่	Si Somdet	ศรีสมเด็จ	Roi Et	ร้อยเอ็ด	North-East
Nong Yai	หนองใหญ่	Phon Thong	โพนทอง	Roi Et	ร้อยเอ็ด	North-East
Nong Yai	หนองใหญ่	Satuek	สตึก	Buriram	บุรีรัมย์	North-East
Nong Yai	หนองใหญ่	Prasat	ปราสาท	Surin	สุรินทร์	North-East
Nong Yai	หนองใหญ่	Nong Yai	หนองใหญ่	Chonburi	ชลบุรี	East
Nong Yai	หนองใหญ่	Nong Kung Si	หนองกุงศรี	Kalasin	กาฬสินธุ์	North-East
Nong Yai Da	หนองยายดา	Thap Than	ทัพทัน	Uthai Thani	อุทัยธานี	Central
Nong Yai Phim	หนองยายพิมพ์	Nang Rong	นางรอง	Buriram	บุรีรัมย์	North-East
Nong Yai To	หนองยายโต๊ะ	Chai Badan	ชัยบาดาล	Lopburi	ลพบุรี	Central
Nong Yang	หนองยาง	Chaloem Phra Kiat	เฉลิมพระเกียรติ	Nakhon Ratchasima	นครราชสีมา	North-East
Nong Yang	หนองยาง	Nong Chang	หนองฉาง	Uthai Thani	อุทัยธานี	Central
Nong Yang Chin	หนองย่างชิ้น	Renu Nakhon	เรณูนคร	Nakhon Phanom	นครพนม	North-East
Nong Yang Suea	หนองย่างเสือ	Muak Lek	มวกเหล็ก	Saraburi	สระบุรี	Central
Nong Yang Thoi	หนองย่างทอย	Si Thep	ศรีเทพ	Phetchabun	เพชรบูรณ์	Central
Nong Yao	หนองยาว	Phanom Sarakham	พนมสารคาม	Chachoengsao	ฉะเชิงเทรา	East
Nong Yao	หนองยาว	Lat Yao	ลาดยาว	Nakhon Sawan	นครสวรรค์	Central
Nong Yao	หนองยาว	Mueang Saraburi	เมืองสระบุรี	Saraburi	สระบุรี	Central
Nong Yat	หนองญาติ	Mueang Nakhon Phanom	เมืองนครพนม	Nakhon Phanom	นครพนม	North-East
Nong Yong	หนองยอง	Pak Khat	ปากคาด	Bueng Kan	บึงกาฬ	North-East
Nong Yuang	หนองยวง	Wiang Nong Long	เวียงหนองล่อง	Lamphun	ลำพูน	North
Nong Yueang	หนองเยือง	Ban Mai Chaiyaphot	บ้านใหม่ไชยพจน์	Buriram	บุรีรัมย์	North-East
Nonsi	นนทรี	Kabin Buri	กบินทร์บุรี	Prachin Buri	ปราจีนบุรี	East
Nonsi	นนทรีย์	Bo Rai	บ่อไร่	Trat	ตราด	East
Nop Pring	นบปริง	Mueang Phang Nga	เมืองพังงา	Phang Nga	พังงา	South
Noppharat	นพรัตน์	Nong Suea	หนองเสือ	Pathum Thani	ปทุมธานี	Central
Nopphitam	นบพิตำ	Nopphitam	นบพิตำ	Nakhon Si Thammarat	นครศรีธรรมราช	South
Norasing	นรสิงห์	Pa Mok	ป่าโมก	Ang Thong	อ่างทอง	Central
Nuan Chan	นวลจันทร์	Khet Bueng Kum	บึงกุ่ม	Bangkok	กรุงเทพมหานคร	Central
Nuea	เหนือ	Mueang Kalasin	เมืองกาฬสินธุ์	Kalasin	กาฬสินธุ์	North-East
Nuea Khlong	เหนือคลอง	Nuea Khlong	เหนือคลอง	Krabi	กระบี่	South
Nuea Mueang	เหนือเมือง	Mueang Roi Et	เมืองร้อยเอ็ด	Roi Et	ร้อยเอ็ด	North-East
O Lo	โอโล	Phu Khiao	ภูเขียว	Chaiyaphum	ชัยภูมิ	North-East
O Ngoen	ออเงิน	Khet Sai Mai	สายไหม	Bangkok	กรุงเทพมหานคร	Central
Oi	ออย	Pong	ปง	Phayao	พะเยา	North
Om Ko	อ้อมกอ	Ban Dung	บ้านดุง	Udon Thani	อุดรธานี	North-East
Om Kret	อ้อมเกร็ด	Pak Kret	ปากเกร็ด	Nonthaburi	นนทบุรี	Central
Om Noi	อ้อมน้อย	Krathum Baen	กระทุ่มแบน	Samut Sakhon	สมุทรสาคร	Central
Om Yai	อ้อมใหญ่	Sam Phran	สามพราน	Nakhon Pathom	นครปฐม	Central
Omkoi	อมก๋อย	Omkoi	อมก๋อย	Chiang Mai	เชียงใหม่	North
On Klang	ออนกลาง	Mae On	แม่ออน	Chiang Mai	เชียงใหม่	North
On Nuea	ออนเหนือ	Mae On	แม่ออน	Chiang Mai	เชียงใหม่	North
On Nut	อ่อนนุช	Khet Suan Luang	สวนหลวง	Bangkok	กรุงเทพมหานคร	Central
On Tai	ออนใต้	San Kamphaeng	สันกำแพง	Chiang Mai	เชียงใหม่	North
Ong Phra	องค์พระ	Dan Chang	ด่านช้าง	Suphan Buri	สุพรรณบุรี	Central
Ongkharak	องครักษ์	Bang Pla Ma	บางปลาม้า	Suphan Buri	สุพรรณบุรี	Central
Ongkharak	องครักษ์	Pho Thong	โพธิ์ทอง	Ang Thong	อ่างทอง	Central
Ongkharak	องครักษ์	Ongkharak	องครักษ์	Nakhon Nayok	นครนายก	Central
Op Thom	อบทม	Samko	สามโก้	Ang Thong	อ่างทอง	Central
Oraphim	อรพิมพ์	Khon Buri	ครบุรี	Nakhon Ratchasima	นครราชสีมา	North-East

== See also ==
- Organization of the government of Thailand
- List of districts of Thailand
- List of districts of Bangkok
- List of tambon in Thailand
- Provinces of Thailand
- List of municipalities in Thailand
