= Nong Ha =

Coordinates: 15.100032°N 103.913681°E

Nong Ha (Thai: หนองฮะ) is a sub-district of Samrong Thap District (สำโรงทาบ) in Surin Province, Thailand
