= List of tambon in Thailand (P) =

This is a list of tambon (sub-districts) in Thailand, beginning with the letter P. This information is liable to change due to border changes or re-allocation of Tambons.

Tambon (subdistrict)	ตำบล	Amphoe (district)	อำเภอ	Changwat (province)	จังหวัด	Region
Pa Ao	ปะอาว	Uthumphon Phisai	อุทุมพรพิสัย	Sisaket	ศรีสะเกษ	North-East
Pa Bon	ป่าบอน	Pa Bon	ป่าบอน	Phatthalung	พัทลุง	South
Pa Bon	ป่าบอน	Khok Pho	โคกโพธิ์	Pattani	ปัตตานี	South
Pa Bong	ป่าบง	Saraphi	สารภี	Chiang Mai	เชียงใหม่	North
Pa Chan	ป่าชัน	Phlapphla Chai	พลับพลาชัย	Buriram	บุรีรัมย์	North-East
Pa Ching	ป่าชิง	Chana (Malay: Chenok)	จะนะ	Songkhla	สงขลา	South
Pa Daeng	ป่าแดง	Chat Trakan	ชาติตระการ	Phitsanulok	พิษณุโลก	Central
Pa Daeng	ป่าแดง	Mueang Phrae	เมืองแพร่	Phrae	แพร่	North
Pa Daet	ป่าแดด	Pa Daet	ป่าแดด	Chiang Rai	เชียงราย	North
Pa Daet	ป่าแดด	Mueang Chiang Mai	เมืองเชียงใหม่	Chiang Mai	เชียงใหม่	North
Pa Daet	ป่าแดด	Mae Suai	แม่สรวย	Chiang Rai	เชียงราย	North
Pa Deng	ป่าเด็ง	Kaeng Krachan	แก่งกระจาน	Phetchaburi	เพชรบุรี	West
Pa Fa	ปาฝา	Changhan	จังหาร	Roi Et	ร้อยเอ็ด	North-East
Pa Faek	ป่าแฝก	Mae Chai	แม่ใจ	Phayao	พะเยา	North
Pa Faek	ป่าแฝก	Phon Charoen	พรเจริญ	Bueng Kan	บึงกาฬ	North-East
Pa Faek	ป่าแฝก	Phon Charoen	พรเจริญ	Nong Khai	หนองคาย	North-East
Pa Faek	ป่าแฝก	Kong Krailat	กงไกรลาศ	Sukhothai	สุโขทัย	Central
Pa Hung	ป่าหุ่ง	Phan	พาน	Chiang Rai	เชียงราย	North
Pa Kai	ป่าไก่	Pak Tho	ปากท่อ	Ratchaburi	ราชบุรี	West
Pa Kha	ป่าขะ	Ban Na	บ้านนา	Nakhon Nayok	นครนายก	Central
Pa Kha	ป่าคา	Tha Wang Pha	ท่าวังผา	Nan	น่าน	North
Pa Khai	ป่าคาย	Thong Saen Khan	ทองแสนขัน	Uttaradit	อุตรดิตถ์	North
Pa Khat	ป่าขาด	Singhanakhon	สิงหนคร	Songkhla	สงขลา	South
Pa Khiap	ปะเคียบ	Khu Mueang	คูเมือง	Buriram	บุรีรัมย์	North-East
Pa Khlok	ป่าคลอก	Thalang	ถลาง	Phuket	ภูเก็ต	South
Pa Kho	ปะโค	Mueang Nong Khai	เมืองหนองคาย	Nong Khai	หนองคาย	North-East
Pa Kho	ปะโค	Kut Chap	กุดจับ	Udon Thani	อุดรธานี	North-East
Pa Klang	ป่ากลาง	Pua	ปัว	Nan	น่าน	North
Pa Ko	ป่าก่อ	Chanuman	ชานุมาน	Amnat Charoen	อำนาจเจริญ	North-East
Pa Ko	ป่ากอ	Mueang Phang Nga district	เมืองพังงา	Phang Nga	พังงา	South
Pa Ko Dam	ป่าก่อดำ	Mae Lao	แม่ลาว	Chiang Rai	เชียงราย	North
Pa Kum Ko	ป่ากุมเกาะ	Sawankhalok	สวรรคโลก	Sukhothai	สุโขทัย	Central
Pa Laeo Luang	ป่าแลวหลวง	Santi Suk	สันติสุข	Nan	น่าน	North
Pa Lan	ป่าลาน	Doi Saket	ดอยสะเก็ด	Chiang Mai	เชียงใหม่	North
Pa Lao	ป่าเลา	Mueang Phetchabun	เมืองเพชรบูรณ์	Phetchabun	เพชรบูรณ์	Central
Pa Maet	ป่าแมต	Mueang Phrae	เมืองแพร่	Phrae	แพร่	North
Pa Mai Ngam	ป่าไม้งาม	Mueang Nongbua Lamphu	เมืองหนองบัวลำภู	Nong Bua Lamphu	หนองบัวลำภู	North-East
Pa Makhap	ป่ามะคาบ	Mueang Phichit	เมืองพิจิตร	Phichit	พิจิตร	Central
Pa Mamuang	ป่ามะม่วง	Mueang Tak	เมืองตาก	Tak	ตาก	West
Pa Manao	ป่ามะนาว	Ban Fang	บ้านฝาง	Khon Kaen	ขอนแก่น	North-East
Pa Miang	ป่าเมี่ยง	Doi Saket	ดอยสะเก็ด	Chiang Mai	เชียงใหม่	North
Pa Mok	ป่าโมก	Pa Mok	ป่าโมก	Ang Thong	อ่างทอง	Central
Pa Mong	ป่าโมง	Det Udom	เดชอุดม	Ubon Ratchathani	อุบลราชธานี	North-East
Pa Nai	ป่าไหน่	Phrao	พร้าว	Chiang Mai	เชียงใหม่	North
Pa Ngae	ป่าแงะ	Pa Daet	ป่าแดด	Chiang Rai	เชียงราย	North
Pa Ngio	ป่างิ้ว	Si Satchanalai	ศรีสัชนาลัย	Sukhothai	สุโขทัย	Central
Pa Ngio	ป่างิ้ว	Mueang Ang Thong	เมืองอ่างทอง	Ang Thong	อ่างทอง	Central
Pa Ngio	ป่างิ้ว	Wiang Pa Pao	เวียงป่าเป้า	Chiang Rai	เชียงราย	North
Pa O	ป่าอ้อ	Lan Sak	ลานสัก	Uthai Thani	อุทัยธานี	Central
Pa O Don Chai	ป่าอ้อดอนชัย	Mueang Chiang Rai	เมืองเชียงราย	Chiang Rai	เชียงราย	North
Pa Pae	ป่าแป๋	Mae Sariang	แม่สะเรียง	Mae Hong Son	แม่ฮ่องสอน	North
Pa Pae	ป่าแป๋	Mae Taeng	แม่แตง	Chiang Mai	เชียงใหม่	North
Pa Phai	ป่าไผ่	San Sai	สันทราย	Chiang Mai	เชียงใหม่	North
Pa Phai	ป่าไผ่	Li	ลี้	Lamphun	ลำพูน	North
Pa Phayom	ป่าพะยอม	Pa Phayom	ป่าพะยอม	Phatthalung	พัทลุง	South
Pa Phlu	ป่าพลู	Ban Hong	บ้านโฮ่ง	Lamphun	ลำพูน	North
Pa Phutsa	ป่าพุทรา	Khanu Woralaksaburi	ขาณุวรลักษบุรี	Kamphaeng Phet	กำแพงเพชร	Central
Pa Po	ป่าปอ	Ban Phai	บ้านไผ่	Khon Kaen	ขอนแก่น	North-East
Pa Pong	ป่าโปง	Sop Moei	สบเมย	Mae Hong Son	แม่ฮ่องสอน	North
Pa Pong	ป่าป้อง	Doi Saket	ดอยสะเก็ด	Chiang Mai	เชียงใหม่	North
Pa Rai	ป่าไร่	Mae Lan	แม่ลาน	Pattani	ปัตตานี	South
Pa Rai	ป่าไร่	Don Tan	ดอนตาล	Mukdahan	มุกดาหาร	North-East
Pa Rai	ป่าไร่	Aranyaprathet	อรัญประเทศ	Sa Kaeo	สระแก้ว	East
Pa Rakam	ป่าระกำ	Pak Phanang	ปากพนัง	Nakhon Si Thammarat	นครศรีธรรมราช	South
Pa Ron	ป่าร่อน	Kanchanadit	กาญจนดิษฐ์	Surat Thani	สุราษฎร์ธานี	South
Pa Sak	ป่าสัก	Mueang Lamphun	เมืองลำพูน	Lamphun	ลำพูน	North
Pa Sak	ป่าสัก	Phu Sang	ภูซาง	Phayao	พะเยา	North
Pa Sak	ป่าสัก	Chiang Saen	เชียงแสน	Chiang Rai	เชียงราย	North
Pa Sak	ป่าสัก	Wang Chin	วังชิ้น	Phrae	แพร่	North
Pa Sakae	ป่าสะแก	Doem Bang Nang Buat	เดิมบางนางบวช	Suphan Buri	สุพรรณบุรี	Central
Pa Sang	ป่าซาง	Pa Sang	ป่าซาง	Lamphun	ลำพูน	North
Pa Sang	ป่าซาง	Wiang Chiang Rung	เวียงเชียงรุ้ง	Chiang Rai	เชียงราย	North
Pa Sang	ป่าซาง	Mae Chan	แม่จัน	Chiang Rai	เชียงราย	North
Pa Sang	ป่าซาง	Dok Khamtai	ดอกคำใต้	Phayao	พะเยา	North
Pa Sang	ป่าสังข์	Chaturaphak Phiman	จตุรพักตรพิมาน	Roi Et	ร้อยเอ็ด	North-East
Pa Sao	ป่าเซ่า	Mueang Uttaradit	เมืองอุตรดิตถ์	Uttaradit	อุตรดิตถ์	North
Pa Tan	ป่าตัน	Mueang Chiang Mai	เมืองเชียงใหม่	Chiang Mai	เชียงใหม่	North
Pa Tan	ป่าตัน	Mae Tha	แม่ทะ	Lampang	ลำปาง	North
Pa Tan	ป่าตาล	Khun Tan	ขุนตาล	Chiang Rai	เชียงราย	North
Pa Tan	ป่าตาล	Mueang Lopburi	เมืองลพบุรี	Lopburi	ลพบุรี	Central
Pa Tong	ป่าตอง	Kathu	กะทู้	Phuket	ภูเก็ต	South
Pa Tueng	ป่าตึง	Mae Chan	แม่จัน	Chiang Rai	เชียงราย	North
Pa Tum	ป่าตุ้ม	Phrao	พร้าว	Chiang Mai	เชียงใหม่	North
Pa Wai	ป่าหวาย	Suan Phueng	สวนผึ้ง	Ratchaburi	ราชบุรี	West
Pa Wai Nang	ป่าหวายนั่ง	Ban Fang	บ้านฝาง	Khon Kaen	ขอนแก่น	North-East
Pa We	ป่าเว	Chaiya	ไชยา	Surat Thani	สุราษฎร์ธานี	South
Pa Yup Nai	ป่ายุบใน	Wang Chan	วังจันทร์	Rayong	ระยอง	East
Pa-ao	ปะอาว	Mueang Ubon Ratchathani	เมืองอุบลราชธานี	Ubon Ratchathani	อุบลราชธานี	North-East
Padang Besa	ปาดังเบซาร์	Sadao (Malay: Sendawa)	สะเดา	Songkhla	สงขลา	South
Pado	ปะโด	Mayo	มายอ	Pattani	ปัตตานี	South
Paera	แป-ระ	Tha Phae	ท่าแพ	Satun	สตูล	South
Paen	แป้น	Sai Buri (Malay: Telube or Selindung Bayu)	สายบุรี	Pattani	ปัตตานี	South
Pak Bang	ปากบาง	Thepha (Malay: Tiba)	เทพา	Songkhla	สงขลา	South
Pak Bong	ปากบ่อง	Pa Sang	ป่าซาง	Lamphun	ลำพูน	North
Pak Chaem	ปากแจ่ม	Huai Yot	ห้วยยอด	Trang	ตรัง	South
Pak Chalui	ปากฉลุย	Tha Chang	ท่าฉาง	Surat Thani	สุราษฎร์ธานี	South
Pak Chan	ปากจั่น	Kra Buri	กระบุรี	Ranong	ระนอง	South
Pak Chan	ปากจั่น	Nakhon Luang	นครหลวง	Phra Nakhon Si Ayutthaya	พระนครศรีอยุธยา	Central
Pak Chom	ปากชม	Pak Chom	ปากชม	Loei	เลย	North-East
Pak Chong	ปากช่อง	Pak Chong	ปากช่อง	Nakhon Ratchasima	นครราชสีมา	North-East
Pak Chong	ปากช่อง	Lom Sak	หล่มสัก	Phetchabun	เพชรบูรณ์	Central
Pak Chong	ปากช่อง	Chom Bueng	จอมบึง	Ratchaburi	ราชบุรี	West
Pak Duk	ปากดุก	Lom Sak	หล่มสัก	Phetchabun	เพชรบูรณ์	Central
Pak Kang	ปากกาง	Long	ลอง	Phrae	แพร่	North
Pak Khao San	ปากข้าวสาร	Mueang Saraburi	เมืองสระบุรี	Saraburi	สระบุรี	Central
Pak Khat	ปากคาด	Pak Khat	ปากคาด	Bueng Kan	บึงกาฬ	North-East
Pak Khat	ปากคาด	Pak Khat	ปากคาด	Nong Khai	หนองคาย	North-East
Pak Khlong	ปากคลอง	Phato	พะโต๊ะ	Chumphon	ชุมพร	South
Pak Khlong Bang Pla Kot	ปากคลองบางปลากด	Phra Samut Chedi	พระสมุทรเจดีย์	Samut Prakan	สมุทรปราการ	Central
Pak Khlong Phasi Charoen	ปากคลองภาษีเจริญ	Khet Phasi Charoen	ภาษีเจริญ	Bangkok	กรุงเทพมหานคร	Central
Pak Khom	ปากคม	Huai Yot	ห้วยยอด	Trang	ตรัง	South
Pak Khwae	ปากแคว	Mueang Sukhothai	เมืองสุโขทัย	Sukhothai	สุโขทัย	Central
Pak Kran	ปากกราน	Phra Nakhon Si Ayutthaya	พระนครศรีอยุธยา	Phra Nakhon Si Ayutthaya	พระนครศรีอยุธยา	Central
Pak Kret	ปากเกร็ด	Pak Kret	ปากเกร็ด	Nonthaburi	นนทบุรี	Central
Pak Lo	ปากล่อ	Khok Pho	โคกโพธิ์	Pattani	ปัตตานี	South
Pak Mak	ปากหมาก	Chaiya	ไชยา	Surat Thani	สุราษฎร์ธานี	South
Pak Man	ปากหมัน	Dan Sai	ด่านซ้าย	Loei	เลย	North-East
Pak Nakhon	ปากนคร	Mueang Nakhon Si Thammarat	นครศรีธรรมราช	Nakhon Si Thammarat	นครศรีธรรมราช	South
Pak Nam	ปากน้ำ	Mueang Krabi	เมืองกระบี่	Krabi	กระบี่	South
Pak Nam	ปากน้ำ	Mueang Samut Prakan	เมืองสมุทรปราการ	Samut Prakan	สมุทรปราการ	Central
Pak Nam	ปากน้ำ	Sawankhalok	สวรรคโลก	Sukhothai	สุโขทัย	Central
Pak Nam	ปากน้ำ	Mueang Chumphon	เมืองชุมพร	Chumphon	ชุมพร	South
Pak Nam	ปากน้ำ	Mueang Rayong	เมืองระยอง	Rayong	ระยอง	East
Pak Nam	ปากน้ำ	La-ngu	ละงู	Satun	สตูล	South
Pak Nam	ปากน้ำ	Doem Bang Nang Buat	เดิมบางนางบวช	Suphan Buri	สุพรรณบุรี	Central
Pak Nam	ปากน้ำ	Mueang Ranong	เมืองระนอง	Ranong	ระนอง	South
Pak Nam	ปากน้ำ	Bang Khla	บางคล้า	Chachoengsao	ฉะเชิงเทรา	East
Pak Nam Krasae	ปากน้ำกระแส	Klaeng	แกลง	Rayong	ระยอง	East
Pak Nam Laem Sing	ปากน้ำแหลมสิงห์	Laem Sing	แหลมสิงห์	Chanthaburi	จันทบุรี	East
Pak Nam Pho	ปากน้ำโพ	Mueang Nakhon Sawan	เมืองนครสวรรค์	Nakhon Sawan	นครสวรรค์	Central
Pak Nam Pran	ปากน้ำปราณ	Pran Buri	ปราณบุรี	Prachuap Khiri Khan	ประจวบคีรีขันธ์	West
Pak Phanang	ปากพนัง	Pak Phanang	ปากพนัง	Nakhon Si Thammarat	นครศรีธรรมราช	South
Pak Phanang Fang Tawan Ok	ปากพนังฝั่งตะวันออก	Pak Phanang	ปากพนัง	Nakhon Si Thammarat	นครศรีธรรมราช	South
Pak Phanang Fang Tawan Tok	ปากพนังฝั่งตะวันตก	Pak Phanang	ปากพนัง	Nakhon Si Thammarat	นครศรีธรรมราช	South
Pak Phayun	ปากพะยูน	Pak Phayun	ปากพะยูน	Phatthalung	พัทลุง	South
Pak Phli	ปากพลี	Pak Phli	ปากพลี	Nakhon Nayok	นครนายก	Central
Pak Phra	ปากพระ	Mueang Sukhothai	เมืองสุโขทัย	Sukhothai	สุโขทัย	Central
Pak Phraek	ปากแพรก	Thung Song	ทุ่งสง	Nakhon Si Thammarat	นครศรีธรรมราช	South
Pak Phraek	ปากแพรก	Bang Saphan Noi	บางสะพานน้อย	Prachuap Khiri Khan	ประจวบคีรีขันธ์	West
Pak Phraek	ปากแพรก	Pak Phanang	ปากพนัง	Nakhon Si Thammarat	นครศรีธรรมราช	South
Pak Phraek	ปากแพรก	Mueang Kanchanaburi	เมืองกาญจนบุรี	Kanchanaburi	กาญจนบุรี	West
Pak Phraek	ปากแพรก	Sawi	สวี	Chumphon	ชุมพร	South
Pak Phriao	ปากเพรียว	Mueang Saraburi	เมืองสระบุรี	Saraburi	สระบุรี	Central
Pak Phun	ปากพูน	Mueang Nakhon Si Thammarat	นครศรีธรรมราช	Nakhon Si Thammarat	นครศรีธรรมราช	South
Pak Prak	ปากแพรก	Don Sak	ดอนสัก	Surat Thani	สุราษฎร์ธานี	South
Pak Puan	ปากปวน	Wang Saphung	วังสะพุง	Loei	เลย	North-East
Pak Raet	ปากแรต	Ban Pong	บ้านโป่ง	Ratchaburi	ราชบุรี	West
Pak Ro	ปากรอ	Singhanakhon	สิงหนคร	Songkhla	สงขลา	South
Pak Song	ปากทรง	Pathio	ปะทิว	Chumphon	ชุมพร	South
Pak Tako	ปากตะโก	Thung Tako	ทุ่งตะโก	Chumphon	ชุมพร	South
Pak Tha	ปากท่า	Tha Ruea	ท่าเรือ	Phra Nakhon Si Ayutthaya	พระนครศรีอยุธยา	Central
Pak Thale	ปากทะเล	Ban Laem	บ้านแหลม	Phetchaburi	เพชรบุรี	West
Pak Thang	ปากทาง	Mueang Phichit	เมืองพิจิตร	Phichit	พิจิตร	Central
Pak Tho	ปากท่อ	Pak Tho	ปากท่อ	Ratchaburi	ราชบุรี	West
Pak Thok	ปากโทก	Mueang Phitsanulok	เมืองพิษณุโลก	Phitsanulok	พิษณุโลก	Central
Pak Tom	ปากตม	Chiang Khan	เชียงคาน	Loei	เลย	North-East
Pak Trae	ปากแตระ	Ranot (Malay: Renut)	ระโนด	Songkhla	สงขลา	South
Paka Harang	ปะกาฮะรัง	Mueang Pattani (Malay: Patani)	เมืองปัตตานี	Pattani	ปัตตานี	South
Pakae Bohin	ป่าแก่บ่อหิน	Thung Wa	ทุ่งหว้า	Satun	สตูล	South
Pakasai	ปกาสัย	Nuea Khlong	เหนือคลอง	Krabi	กระบี่	South
Pakham	ปะคำ	Pakham	ปะคำ	Buriram	บุรีรัมย์	North-East
Pakho	ปะโค	Kumphawapi	กุมภวาปี	Udon Thani	อุดรธานี	North-East
Paknam	ปากน้ำ	Lang Suan	หลังสวน	Chumphon	ชุมพร	South
Paku	ปากู	Thung Yang Daeng	ทุ่งยางแดง	Pattani	ปัตตานี	South
Palan	ปะหลาน	Phayakkhaphum Phisai	พยัคฆภูมิพิสัย	Maha Sarakham	มหาสารคาม	North-East
Palian	ปะเหลียน	Palian	ปะเหลียน	Trang	ตรัง	South
Palm Phatthana	ปาล์มพัฒนา	Manang	มะนัง	Satun	สตูล	South
Paluka Samo	ปะลุกาสาเมาะ	Bacho (Malay: Bahcok)	บาเจาะ	Narathiwat	นราธิวาส	South
Paluru	ปะลุรู	Su-ngai Padi (Malay: Sungai Padi)	สุไหงปาดี	Narathiwat	นราธิวาส	South
Pan Tae	ปันแต	Khuan Khanun	ควนขนุน	Phatthalung	พัทลุง	South
Panan	ปานัน	Mayo	มายอ	Pattani	ปัตตานี	South
Panare	ปะนาเระ	Panare (Malay: Penarik)	ปะนาเระ	Pattani	ปัตตานี	South
Pang Hin Fon	ปางหินฝน	Mae Chaem	แม่แจ่ม	Chiang Mai	เชียงใหม่	North
Pang Ku	ปังกู	Prakhon Chai	ประโคนชัย	Buriram	บุรีรัมย์	North-East
Pang Ku	ปางกู่	Non Sang	โนนสัง	Nong Bua Lamphu	หนองบัวลำภู	North-East
Pang Makha	ปางมะค่า	Khanu Woralaksaburi	ขาณุวรลักษบุรี	Kamphaeng Phet	กำแพงเพชร	Central
Pang Mapha	ปางมะผ้า	Pang Mapha	ปางมะผ้า	Mae Hong Son	แม่ฮ่องสอน	North
Pang Mu	ปางหมู	Mueang Mae Hong Son	เมืองแม่ฮ่องสอน	Mae Hong Son	แม่ฮ่องสอน	North
Pang Sawan	ปางสวรรค์	Chum Ta Bong	ชุมตาบง	Nakhon Sawan	นครสวรรค์	Central
Pang Ta Wai	ปางตาไว	Pang Sila Thong	ปางศิลาทอง	Kamphaeng Phet	กำแพงเพชร	Central
Pang Wan	ปังหวาน	Pathio	ปะทิว	Chumphon	ชุมพร	South
Pao	เป้า	Trakan Phuet Phon	ตระการพืชผล	Ubon Ratchathani	อุบลราชธานี	North-East
Pase Yawo	ปะเสยะวอ	Sai Buri (Malay: Telube or Selindung Bayu)	สายบุรี	Pattani	ปัตตานี	South
Pase Mat	ปาเสมัส	Su-ngai Kolok (Malay: Sungai Golok)	สุไหงโก-ลก	Narathiwat	นราธิวาส	South
Patae	ปะแต	Yaha	ยะหา	Yala	ยะลา	South
Pathum	ปทุม	Mueang Ubon Ratchathani	เมืองอุบลราชธานี	Ubon Ratchathani	อุบลราชธานี	North-East
Pathum Wan	ปทุมวัน	Khet Pathum Wan	ปทุมวัน	Bangkok	กรุงเทพมหานคร	Central
Pathum Wapi	ปทุมวาปี	Song Dao	ส่องดาว	Sakon Nakhon	สกลนคร	North-East
Patong	ปะตง	Soi Dao	สอยดาว	Chanthaburi	จันทบุรี	East
Patthawi	ปัถวี	Makham	มะขาม	Chanthaburi	จันทบุรี	East
Pen Suk	เป็นสุข	Chom Phra	จอมพระ	Surin	สุรินทร์	North-East
Pha Bing	ผาบิ้ง	Wang Saphung	วังสะพุง	Loei	เลย	North-East
Pha Bong	ผาบ่อง	Mueang Mae Hong Son	เมืองแม่ฮ่องสอน	Mae Hong Son	แม่ฮ่องสอน	North
Pha Chang Noi	ผาช้างน้อย	Pong	ปง	Phayao	พะเยา	North
Pha Chuk	ผาจุก	Mueang Uttaradit	เมืองอุตรดิตถ์	Uttaradit	อุตรดิตถ์	North
Pha In Plaeng	ผาอินทร์แปลง	Erawan	เอราวัณ	Loei	เลย	North-East
Pha Khao	ผาขาว	Pha Khao	ผาขาว	Loei	เลย	North-East
Pha Lueat	ผาเลือด	Tha Pla	ท่าปลา	Uttaradit	อุตรดิตถ์	North
Pha Nam Yoi	ผาน้ำย้อย	Nong Phok	หนองพอก	Roi Et	ร้อยเอ็ด	North-East
Pha Ngam	ผางาม	Wiang Chai	เวียงชัย	Chiang Rai	เชียงราย	North
Pha Noi	ผาน้อย	Wang Saphung	วังสะพุง	Loei	เลย	North-East
Pha Nok Khao	ผานกเค้า	Phu Kradueng	ภูกระดึง	Loei	เลย	North-East
Pha Pang	ผาปัง	Mae Phrik	แม่ริม	Lampang	ลำปาง	North
Pha Sam Yot	ผาสามยอด	Erawan	เอราวัณ	Loei	เลย	North-East
Pha Sawoei	ผาเสวย	Somdet	สมเด็จ	Kalasin	กาฬสินธุ์	North-East
Pha Suk	ผาสุก	Kumphawapi	กุมภวาปี	Udon Thani	อุดรธานี	North-East
Pha Tang	ผาตั้ง	Sangkhom	สังคม	Nong Khai	หนองคาย	North-East
Pha Thong	ผาทอง	Tha Wang Pha	ท่าวังผา	Nan	น่าน	North
Pha To	ผาตอ	Tha Wang Pha	ท่าวังผา	Nan	น่าน	North
Pha-ngat	พะงาด	Kham Sakaesaeng	ขามสะแกแสง	Nakhon Ratchasima	นครราชสีมา	North-East
Phachi	ภาชี	Phachi	ภาชี	Phra Nakhon Si Ayutthaya	พระนครศรีอยุธยา	Central
Phadung Mat	ผดุงมาตร	Chanae	จะแนะ	Narathiwat	นราธิวาส	South
Phaeng	แพง	Kosum Phisai	โกสุมพิสัย	Maha Sarakham	มหาสารคาม	North-East
Phaeng Yai	แพงใหญ่	Lao Suea Kok	เหล่าเสือโก้ก	Ubon Ratchathani	อุบลราชธานี	North-East
Phaengphuai	แพงพวย	Damnoen Saduak	ดำเนินสะดวก	Ratchaburi	ราชบุรี	West
Phaet	แพด	Kham Ta Kla	คำตากล้า	Sakon Nakhon	สกลนคร	North-East
Phai	ไผ่	Rasi Salai	ราษีไศล	Sisaket	ศรีสะเกษ	North-East
Phai	ไผ่	Mueang Kalasin	เมืองกาฬสินธุ์	Kalasin	กาฬสินธุ์	North-East
Phai	ไผ่	Rattanaburi	รัตนบุรี	Surin	สุรินทร์	North-East
Phai Cha Lueat	ไผ่ชะเลือด	Si Mahosot	ศรีมโหสถ	Prachin Buri	ปราจีนบุรี	East
Phai Cham Sin	ไผ่จำศิล	Wiset Chai Chan	วิเศษชัยชาญ	Ang Thong	อ่างทอง	Central
Phai Dam Phatthana	ไผ่ดำพัฒนา	Wiset Chai Chan	วิเศษชัยชาญ	Ang Thong	อ่างทอง	Central
Phai Hu Chang	ไผ่หูช้าง	Bang Len	บางเลน	Nakhon Pathom	นครปฐม	Central
Phai Khiao	ไผ่เขียว	Sawang Arom	สว่างอารมณ์	Uthai Thani	อุทัยธานี	Central
Phai Kho Don	ไผ่ขอดอน	Mueang Phitsanulok	เมืองพิษณุโลก	Phitsanulok	พิษณุโลก	Central
Phai Khwang	ไผ่ขวาง	Mueang Phichit	เมืองพิจิตร	Phichit	พิจิตร	Central
Phai Khwang	ไผ่ขวาง	Mueang Suphanburi	เมืองสุพรรณบุรี	Suphan Buri	สุพรรณบุรี	Central
Phai Khwang	ไผ่ขวาง	Ban Mo	บ้านหมอ	Saraburi	สระบุรี	Central
Phai Kong Din	ไผ่กองดิน	Bang Pla Ma	บางปลาม้า	Suphan Buri	สุพรรณบุรี	Central
Phai Ling	ไผ่ลิง	Phra Nakhon Si Ayutthaya	พระนครศรีอยุธยา	Phra Nakhon Si Ayutthaya	พระนครศรีอยุธยา	Central
Phai Lio	ไผ่หลิ่ว	Don Phut	ดอนพุด	Saraburi	สระบุรี	Central
Phai Lom	ไผ่ล้อม	Ban Phaeng	บ้านแพง	Nakhon Phanom	นครพนม	North-East
Phai Lom	ไผ่ล้อม	Phachi	ภาชี	Phra Nakhon Si Ayutthaya	พระนครศรีอยุธยา	Central
Phai Lom	ไผ่ล้อม	Bang Krathum	บางกระทุ่ม	Phitsanulok	พิษณุโลก	Central
Phai Lom	ไผ่ล้อม	Laplae	ลับแล	Uttaradit	อุตรดิตถ์	North
Phai Luang	ไผ่หลวง	Taphan Hin	ตะพานหิน	Phichit	พิจิตร	Central
Phai Phra	ไผ่พระ	Bang Sai	บางไทร	Phra Nakhon Si Ayutthaya	พระนครศรีอยุธยา	Central
Phai Rop	ไผ่รอบ	Pho Prathap Chang	โพธิ์ประทับช้าง	Phichit	พิจิตร	Central
Phai Sing	ไผ่สิงห์	Chum Saeng	ชุมแสง	Nakhon Sawan	นครสวรรค์	Central
Phai Tam	ไผ่ต่ำ	Nong Khae	หนองแค	Saraburi	สระบุรี	Central
Phai Tha Pho	ไผ่ท่าโพ	Pho Prathap Chang	โพธิ์ประทับช้าง	Phichit	พิจิตร	Central
Phai Thon	ไผ่โทน	Rong Kwang	ร้องกวาง	Phrae	แพร่	North
Phai Wong	ไผ่วง	Wiset Chai Chan	วิเศษชัยชาญ	Ang Thong	อ่างทอง	Central
Phai Yai	ไผ่ใหญ่	Ban Mi	บ้านหมี่	Lopburi	ลพบุรี	Central
Phai Yai	ไผ่ใหญ่	Muang Sam Sip	ม่วงสามสิบ	Ubon Ratchathani	อุบลราชธานี	North-East
Phaibun	ไพบูลย์	Nam Khun	น้ำขุ่น	Ubon Ratchathani	อุบลราชธานี	North-East
Phaisali	ไพศาลี	Phaisali	ไพศาลี	Nakhon Sawan	นครสวรรค์	Central
Phaisan	ไพศาล	Prakhon Chai	ประโคนชัย	Buriram	บุรีรัมย์	North-East
Phaisan	ไพศาล	Thawat Buri	ธวัชบุรี	Roi Et	ร้อยเอ็ด	North-East
Phak Hai	ผักไห่	Phak Hai	ผักไห่	Phra Nakhon Si Ayutthaya	พระนครศรีอยุธยา	Central
Phak Hai	ผักขะ	Watthana Nakhon	วัฒนานคร	Sa Kaeo	สระแก้ว	East
Phak Khuang	ผักขวง	Thong Saen Khan	ทองแสนขัน	Uttaradit	อุตรดิตถ์	North
Phak Mai	ผักไหม	Sikhoraphum	ศีขรภูมิ	Surin	สุรินทร์	North-East
Phak Mai	ผักไหม	Huai Thap Than	ห้วยทับทัน	Sisaket	ศรีสะเกษ	North-East
Phak Pang	ผักปัง	Phu Khiao	ภูเขียว	Chaiyaphum	ชัยภูมิ	North-East
Phak Phaeo	ผักแพว	Kanthararom	กันทรารมย์	Sisaket	ศรีสะเกษ	North-East
Phak Than	พักทัน	Bang Rachan	บางระจัน	Sing Buri	สิงห์บุรี	Central
Phak Top	ผักตบ	Nong Han	หนองหาน	Udon Thani	อุดรธานี	North-East
Phak Waen	ผักแว่น	Changhan	จังหาร	Roi Et	ร้อยเอ็ด	North-East
Phalan	พะลาน	Na Tan	นาตาล	Ubon Ratchathani	อุบลราชธานี	North-East
Phan Aen	ภารแอ่น	Phayakkhaphum Phisai	พยัคฆภูมิพิสัย	Maha Sarakham	มหาสารคาม	North-East
Phan Chali	พันชาลี	Wang Thong	วังทอง	Phitsanulok	พิษณุโลก	Central
Phan Chana	พันชนะ	Dan Khun Thot	ด่านขุนทด	Nakhon Ratchasima	นครราชสีมา	North-East
Phan Don	พันดอน	Kumphawapi	กุมภวาปี	Udon Thani	อุดรธานี	North-East
Phan Dung	พันดุง	Kham Thale So	ขามทะเลสอ	Nakhon Ratchasima	นครราชสีมา	North-East
Phan Lan	พันลาน	Chum Saeng	ชุมแสง	Nakhon Sawan	นครสวรรค์	Central
Phan Na	พันนา	Sawang Daen Din	สว่างแดนดิน	Sakon Nakhon	สกลนคร	North-East
Phan Phrao	พานพร้าว	Si Chiang Mai	ศรีเชียงใหม่	Nong Khai	หนองคาย	North-East
Phan Sao	พันเสา	Bang Rakam	บางระกำ	Phitsanulok	พิษณุโลก	Central
Phan Suek	ผ่านศึก	Aranyaprathet	อรัญประเทศ	Sa Kaeo	สระแก้ว	East
Phan Thong	พานทอง	Phan Thong	พานทอง	Chonburi	ชลบุรี	East
Phan Thong	พานทอง	Sai Ngam	ไทรงาม	Kamphaeng Phet	กำแพงเพชร	Central
Phana Nikhom	พนานิคม	Nikhom Phatthana	นิคมพัฒนา	Rayong	ระยอง	East
Phana	พนา	Phana	พนา	Amnat Charoen	อำนาจเจริญ	North-East
Phanang Tung	พนางตุง	Khuan Khanun	ควนขนุน	Phatthalung	พัทลุง	South
Phanao	พะเนา	Mueang Nakhon Ratchasima	เมืองนครราชสีมา	Nakhon Ratchasima	นครราชสีมา	North-East
Phanat Nikhom	พนัสนิคม	Phanat Nikhom	พนัสนิคม	Chonburi	ชลบุรี	East
Phang Daeng	พังแดง	Dong Luang	ดงหลวง	Mukdahan	มุกดาหาร	North-East
Phang Kan	พังกาญจน์	Phanom	พนม	Surat Thani	สุราษฎร์ธานี	South
Phang Khen	พังเคน	Na Tan	นาตาล	Ubon Ratchathani	อุบลราชธานี	North-East
Phang Khon	พังโคน	Phang Khon	พังโคน	Sakon Nakhon	สกลนคร	North-East
Phang Khwang	พังขว้าง	Mueang Sakon Nakhon	เมืองสกลนคร	Sakon Nakhon	สกลนคร	North-East
Phang La	พังลา	Sadao (Malay: Sendawa)	สะเดา	Songkhla	สงขลา	South
Phang Ngu	พังงู	Nong Han	หนองหาน	Udon Thani	อุดรธานี	North-East
Phang Rat	พังราด	Klaeng	แกลง	Rayong	ระยอง	East
Phang Thiam	พังเทียม	Phra Thong Kham	พระทองคำ	Nakhon Ratchasima	นครราชสีมา	North-East
Phang Thui	พังทุย	Nam Phong	น้ำพอง	Khon Kaen	ขอนแก่น	North-East
Phang Tru	พังตรุ	Tha Muang	ท่าม่วง	Kanchanaburi	กาญจนบุรี	West
Phang Tru	พังตรุ	Phanom Thuan	พนมทวน	Kanchanaburi	กาญจนบุรี	West
Phang Yang	พังยาง	Ranot (Malay: Renut)	ระโนด	Songkhla	สงขลา	South
Phaniat	เพนียด	Khok Samrong	โคกสำโรง	Lopburi	ลพบุรี	Central
Phaniat	พะเนียด	Nakhon Chai Si	นครชัยศรี	Nakhon Pathom	นครปฐม	Central
Phanna	พรรณา	Phanna Nikhom	พรรณานิคม	Sakon Nakhon	สกลนคร	North-East
Phanom	พนม	Phanom	พนม	Surat Thani	สุราษฎร์ธานี	South
Phanom	พนอม	Tha Uthen	ท่าอุเทน	Nakhon Phanom	นครพนม	North-East
Phanom Phrai	พนมไพร	Phanom Phrai	พนมไพร	Roi Et	ร้อยเอ็ด	North-East
Phanom Rok	พนมรอก	Tha Tako	ท่าตะโก	Nakhon Sawan	นครสวรรค์	Central
Phanom Sarakham	พนมสารคาม	Phanom Sarakham	พนมสารคาม	Chachoengsao	ฉะเชิงเทรา	East
Phanom Set	พนมเศษ	Tha Tako	ท่าตะโก	Nakhon Sawan	นครสวรรค์	Central
Phanom Thuan	พนมทวน	Phanom Thuan	พนมทวน	Kanchanaburi	กาญจนบุรี	West
Phanom Wang	พนมวังก์	Khuan Khanun	ควนขนุน	Phatthalung	พัทลุง	South
Phanthai Norasing	พันท้ายนรสิงห์	Mueang Samut Sakhon	เมืองสมุทรสาคร	Samut Sakhon	สมุทรสาคร	Central
Phasaeng	พะแสง	Ban Ta Khun	บ้านตาขุน	Surat Thani	สุราษฎร์ธานี	South
Phasuk	ผาสุก	Wang Sam Mo	วังสามหมอ	Udon Thani	อุดรธานี	North-East
Phathai	พะทาย	Tha Uthen	ท่าอุเทน	Nakhon Phanom	นครพนม	North-East
Phathairin	ผไทรินทร์	Lam Plai Mat	ลำปลายมาศ	Buriram	บุรีรัมย์	North-East
Phato	พะโต๊ะ	Pathio	ปะทิว	Chumphon	ชุมพร	South
Phatong	พะตง	Hat Yai	หาดใหญ่	Songkhla	สงขลา	South
Phatthanakan	พัฒนาการ	Khet Suan Luang	สวนหลวง	Bangkok	กรุงเทพมหานคร	Central
Phatthana Nikhom	พัฒนานิคม	Phatthana Nikhom	พัฒนานิคม	Lopburi	ลพบุรี	Central
Phawa	พวา	Kaeng Hang Maeo	แก่งหางแมว	Chanthaburi	จันทบุรี	East
Phawo	พะวอ	Mae Sot	แม่สอด,	Tak	ตาก	West
Phawong	พะวง	Mueang Songkhla (Malay: Singgora)	เมืองสงขลา	Songkhla	สงขลา	South
Phaya Khan	พญาขัน	Mueang Phatthalung	เมืองพัทลุง	Phatthalung	พัทลุง	South
Phaya Maen	พญาแมน	Phichai	พิชัย	Uttaradit	อุตรดิตถ์	North
Phaya Thai	พญาไท	Khet Phaya Thai	พญาไท	Bangkok	กรุงเทพมหานคร	Central
Phaya Wang	พญาวัง	Bueng Sam Phan	บึงสามพัน	Phetchabun	เพชรบูรณ์	Central
Phaya Yen	พญาเย็น	Pak Chong	ปากช่อง	Nakhon Ratchasima	นครราชสีมา	North-East
Phayom	พยอม	Wang Noi	วังน้อย	Phra Nakhon Si Ayutthaya	พระนครศรีอยุธยา	Central
Phayu	พยุห์	Phayu	พยุห์	Sisaket	ศรีสะเกษ	North-East
Phayuha	พยุหะ	Phayuha Khiri	พยุหะคีรี	Nakhon Sawan	นครสวรรค์	Central
Phe	เพ	Mueang Rayong	เมืองระยอง	Rayong	ระยอง	East
Phek Yai	เพ็กใหญ่	Phon	พล	Khon Kaen	ขอนแก่น	North-East
Phela	เพหลา	Khlong Thom	คลองท่อม	Krabi	กระบี่	South
Phen	เพ็ญ	Phen	เพ็ญ	Udon Thani	อุดรธานี	North-East
Phet Chomphu	เพชรชมภู	Kosamphi Nakhon	โกสัมพีนคร	Kamphaeng Phet	กำแพงเพชร	Central
Phet Lakhon	เพชรละคร	Nong Phai	หนองไผ่	Phetchabun	เพชรบูรณ์	Central
Phia Ram	เพี้ยราม	Mueang Surin	เมืองสุรินทร์	Surin	สุรินทร์	North-East
Phibun	พิบูล	Phibun Mangsahan	พิบูลมังสาหาร	Ubon Ratchathani	อุบลราชธานี	North-East
Phichai	พิชัย	Mueang Lampang	เมืองลำปาง	Lampang	ลำปาง	North
Phichit	พิจิตร	Na Mom	นาหม่อม	Songkhla	สงขลา	South
Phihan Daeng	พิหารแดง	Mueang Suphanburi	เมืองสุพรรณบุรี	Suphan Buri	สุพรรณบุรี	Central
Phikun	พิกุล	Chum Saeng	ชุมแสง	Nakhon Sawan	นครสวรรค์	Central
Phikun Ok	พิกุลออก	Ban Na	บ้านนา	Nakhon Nayok	นครนายก	Central
Phikun Thong	พิกุลทอง	Mueang Ratchaburi	เมืองราชบุรี	Ratchaburi	ราชบุรี	West
Phikun Thong	พิกุลทอง	Tha Chang	ท่าช้าง	Sing Buri	สิงห์บุรี	Central
Phimai	พิมาย	Prang Ku	ปรางค์กู่	Sisaket	ศรีสะเกษ	North-East
Phimai	พิมาย	Phimai	พิมาย	Nakhon Ratchasima	นครราชสีมา	North-East
Phimai Nuea	พิมายเหนือ	Prang Ku	ปรางค์กู่	Sisaket	ศรีสะเกษ	North-East
Phiman	พิมาน	Mueang Satun (Malay: Mambang)	เมืองสตูล	Satun	สตูล	South
Phiman	พิมาน	Na Kae	นาแก	Nakhon Phanom	นครพนม	North-East
Phimon Rat	พิมลราช	Bang Bua Thong	บางบัวทอง	Nonthaburi	นนทบุรี	Central
Phimpha	พิมพา	Bang Pakong	บางปะกง	Chachoengsao	ฉะเชิงเทรา	East
Phimun	พิมูล	Huai Mek	ห้วยเม็ก	Kalasin	กาฬสินธุ์	North-East
Phing Phuai	พิงพวย	Si Rattana	ศรีรัตนะ	Sisaket	ศรีสะเกษ	North-East
Phipun	พิปูน	Phipun	พิปูน	Nakhon Si Thammarat	นครศรีธรรมราช	South
Phithen	พิเทน	Thung Yang Daeng	ทุ่งยางแดง	Pattani	ปัตตานี	South
Phitphian	พิตเพียน	Maha Rat	มหาราช	Phra Nakhon Si Ayutthaya	พระนครศรีอยุธยา	Central
Phla	พลา	Ban Chang	บ้านฉาง	Rayong	ระยอง	East
Phlai	ไพล	Prasat	ปราสาท	Surin	สุรินทร์	North-East
Phlai	ไพล	Lam Thamenchai	ลำทะเมนชัย	Nakhon Ratchasima	นครราชสีมา	North-East
Phlai Chumphon	พลายชุมพล	Mueang Phitsanulok	เมืองพิษณุโลก	Phitsanulok	พิษณุโลก	Central
Phlai Wat	พลายวาส	Kanchanadit	กาญจนดิษฐ์	Surat Thani	สุราษฎร์ธานี	South
Phlapphla	พลับพลา	Mueang Chanthaburi	เมืองจันทบุรี	Chanthaburi	จันทบุรี	East
Phlapphla	พลับพลา	Chok Chai	โชคชัย	Nakhon Ratchasima	นครราชสีมา	North-East
Phlapphla	พลับพลา	Chiang Khwan	เชียงขวัญ	Roi Et	ร้อยเอ็ด	North-East
Phlapphla	พลับพลา	Wang Thonglang	วังทองหลาง	Bangkok	กรุงเทพมหานคร	Central
Phlapphla Chai	พลับพลาไชย	U Thong	อู่ทอง	Suphan Buri	สุพรรณบุรี	Central
Phlio	พลิ้ว	Laem Sing	แหลมสิงห์	Chanthaburi	จันทบุรี	East
Phloi Waen	พลอยแหวน	Tha Mai	ท่าใหม่	Chanthaburi	จันทบุรี	East
Phlong Ta Iam	พลงตาเอี่ยม	Wang Chan	วังจันทร์	Rayong	ระยอง	East
Phlu Ta Luang	พลูตาหลวง	Sattahip	สัตหีบ	Chonburi	ชลบุรี	East
Phlu Thuean	พลูเถื่อน	Phanom	พนม	Surat Thani	สุราษฎร์ธานี	South
Phluang	พลวง	Khao Khitchakut	เขาคิชฌกูฏ	Chanthaburi	จันทบุรี	East
Phluang Song Nang	พลวงสองนาง	Sawang Arom	สว่างอารมณ์	Uthai Thani	อุทัยธานี	Central
Phluang Thong	พลวงทอง	Bo Thong	บ่อทอง	Chonburi	ชลบุรี	East
Pho	โพธิ์	Mueang Sisaket	เมืองศรีสะเกษ	Sisaket	ศรีสะเกษ	North-East
Pho	โพธิ์	Non Khun	โนนคูน	Sisaket	ศรีสะเกษ	North-East
Pho Chai	โพธิ์ชัย	In Buri	อินทร์บุรี	Sing Buri	สิงห์บุรี	Central
Pho Chai	โพธิ์ชัย	Phanom Phrai	พนมไพร	Roi Et	ร้อยเอ็ด	North-East
Pho Chai	โพธิ์ชัย	Uthumphon Phisai	อุทุมพรพิสัย	Sisaket	ศรีสะเกษ	North-East
Pho Chai	โพธิ์ชัย	Mueang Nong Khai	เมืองหนองคาย	Nong Khai	หนองคาย	North-East
Pho Chai	โพธิ์ชัย	Mueang Nongbua Lamphu	เมืองหนองบัวลำภู	Nong Bua Lamphu	หนองบัวลำภู	North-East
Pho Chai	โพธิ์ชัย	Wapi Pathum	วาปีปทุม	Maha Sarakham	มหาสารคาม	North-East
Pho Chai	โพธิ์ไชย	Khok Pho Chai	โคกโพธิ์ไชย	Khon Kaen	ขอนแก่น	North-East
Pho Chon Kai	โพชนไก่	Bang Rachan	บางระจัน	Sing Buri	สิงห์บุรี	Central
Pho Daeng	พ้อแดง	Lang Suan	หลังสวน	Chumphon	ชุมพร	South
Pho En	โพธิ์เอน	Tha Ruea	ท่าเรือ	Phra Nakhon Si Ayutthaya	พระนครศรีอยุธยา	Central
Pho Hak	โพหัก	Bang Phae	บางแพ	Ratchaburi	ราชบุรี	West
Pho Kao Ton	โพธิ์เก้าต้น	Mueang Lopburi	เมืองลพบุรี	Lopburi	ลพบุรี	Central
Pho Klang	โพธิ์กลาง	Mueang Nakhon Ratchasima	เมืองนครราชสีมา	Nakhon Ratchasima	นครราชสีมา	North-East
Pho Krasang	โพธิ์กระสังข์	Khun Han	ขุนหาญ	Sisaket	ศรีสะเกษ	North-East
Pho Mak Khaeng	โพธิ์หมากแข้ง	Bueng Khong Long	บึงโขงหลง	Bueng Kan	บึงกาฬ	North-East
Pho Mak Khaeng	โพธิ์หมากแข้ง	Bueng Khong Long	บึงโขงหลง	Nong Khai	หนองคาย	North-East
Pho Ming	พ่อมิ่ง	Panare (Malay: Penarik)	ปะนาเระ	Pattani	ปัตตานี	South
Pho Muang Phan	โพธิ์ม่วงพันธ์	Samko	สามโก้	Ang Thong	อ่างทอง	Central
Pho Nang Dam Ok	โพนางดำออก	Sapphaya	สรรพยา	Chai Nat	ชัยนาท	Central
Pho Nang Dam Tok	โพนางดำตก	Sapphaya	สรรพยา	Chai Nat	ชัยนาท	Central
Pho Ngam	โพงาม	Sankhaburi	สรรคบุรี	Chai Nat	ชัยนาท	Central
Pho Ngam	โพธิ์งาม	Prachantakham	ประจันตคาม	Prachin Buri	ปราจีนบุรี	East
Pho Phaisan	โพธิไพศาล	Kusuman	กุสุมาลย์	Sakon Nakhon	สกลนคร	North-East
Pho Phra	โพพระ	Mueang Phetchaburi	เมืองเพชรบุรี	Phetchaburi	เพชรบุรี	West
Pho Phraya	โพธิ์พระยา	Mueang Suphanburi	เมืองสุพรรณบุรี	Suphan Buri	สุพรรณบุรี	Central
Pho Prachak	โพประจักษ์	Tha Chang	ท่าช้าง	Sing Buri	สิงห์บุรี	Central
Pho Prasat	โพธิ์ประสาท	Phaisali	ไพศาลี	Nakhon Sawan	นครสวรรค์	Central
Pho Prathap Chang	โพธิ์ประทับช้าง	Pho Prathap Chang	โพธิ์ประทับช้าง	Phichit	พิจิตร	Central
Pho Rai Wan	โพไร่หวาน	Mueang Phetchaburi	เมืองเพชรบุรี	Phetchaburi	เพชรบุรี	West
Pho Rang Nok	โพธิ์รังนก	Pho Thong	โพธิ์ทอง	Ang Thong	อ่างทอง	Central
Pho Sadet	โพธิ์เสด็จ	Mueang Nakhon Si Thammarat	นครศรีธรรมราช	Nakhon Si Thammarat	นครศรีธรรมราช	South
Pho Sai	โพธิ์ไทร	Pho Sai	โพธิ์ไทร	Ubon Ratchathani	อุบลราชธานี	North-East
Pho Sai	โพธิ์ไทร	Don Tan	ดอนตาล	Mukdahan	มุกดาหาร	North-East
Pho Sai	โพธิ์ไทร	Phibun Mangsahan	พิบูลมังสาหาร	Ubon Ratchathani	อุบลราชธานี	North-East
Pho Sai Ngam	โพธิ์ไทรงาม	Bueng Na Rang	บึงนาราง	Phichit	พิจิตร	Central
Pho Sangkho	โพสังโฆ	Khai Bang Rachan	ค่ายบางระจัน	Sing Buri	สิงห์บุรี	Central
Pho Sao Han	โพสาวหาญ	Uthai	อุทัย	Phra Nakhon Si Ayutthaya	พระนครศรีอยุธยา	Central
Pho Si	โพธิ์ศรี	Phibun Mangsahan	พิบูลมังสาหาร	Ubon Ratchathani	อุบลราชธานี	North-East
Pho Si	โพธิ์ศรี	Prang Ku	ปรางค์กู่	Sisaket	ศรีสะเกษ	North-East
Pho Si	โพธิ์ศรี	Pho Chai	โพธิ์ชัย	Roi Et	ร้อยเอ็ด	North-East
Pho Si Samran	โพธิ์ศรีสำราญ	Non Sa-at	โนนสะอาด	Udon Thani	อุดรธานี	North-East
Pho Si Sawang	โพธิ์ศรีสว่าง	Phon Thong	โพนทอง	Roi Et	ร้อยเอ็ด	North-East
Pho Taeng	โพแตง	Bang Sai	บางไทร	Phra Nakhon Si Ayutthaya	พระนครศรีอยุธยา	Central
Pho Tak	โพธิ์ตาก	Pho Tak	โพธิ์ตาก	Nong Khai	หนองคาย	North-East
Pho Tak	โพธิ์ตาก	Mueang Nakhon Phanom	เมืองนครพนม	Nakhon Phanom	นครพนม	North-East
Pho Talat Kaeo	โพตลาดแก้ว	Tha Wung	ท่าวุ้ง	Lopburi	ลพบุรี	Central
Pho Thaen	โพธิ์แทน	Ongkharak	องครักษ์	Nakhon Nayok	นครนายก	Central
Pho Thale	โพทะเล	Khai Bang Rachan	ค่ายบางระจัน	Sing Buri	สิงห์บุรี	Central
Pho Thale	โพทะเล	Pho Thale	โพทะเล	Phichit	พิจิตร	Central
Pho Thong	โพธิ์ทอง	Selaphum	เสลภูมิ	Roi Et	ร้อยเอ็ด	North-East
Pho Thong	โพธิ์ทอง	Si Somdet	ศรีสมเด็จ	Roi Et	ร้อยเอ็ด	North-East
Pho Thong	โพธิ์ทอง	Pang Sila Thong	ปางศิลาทอง	Kamphaeng Phet	กำแพงเพชร	Central
Pho Thong	โพธิ์ทอง	Tha Sala	ท่าศาลา	Nakhon Si Thammarat	นครศรีธรรมราช	South
Pho Thong	โพธิ์ทอง	Phon Thong	โพนทอง	Roi Et	ร้อยเอ็ด	North-East
Pho Tru	โพธิ์ตรุ	Mueang Lopburi	เมืองลพบุรี	Lopburi	ลพบุรี	Central
Pho Wong	โพธิ์วงศ์	Khun Han	ขุนหาญ	Sisaket	ศรีสะเกษ	North-East
Pho Yai	โพธิ์ใหญ่	Warin Chamrap	วารินชำราบ	Ubon Ratchathani	อุบลราชธานี	North-East
Pho Yai	โพธิ์ใหญ่	Phanom Phrai	พนมไพร	Roi Et	ร้อยเอ็ด	North-East
Phoem Phun Sap	เพิ่มพูนทรัพย์	Ban Nà Sản	บ้านนาสาร	Surat Thani	สุราษฎร์ธานี	South
Phok Noi	พอกน้อย	Phanna Nikhom	พรรณานิคม	Sakon Nakhon	สกลนคร	North-East
Phok Ruam	โพกรวม	Mueang Sing Buri	เมืองสิงห์บุรี	Sing Buri	สิงห์บุรี	Central
Phon	โพน	Kham Muang	คำม่วง	Kalasin	กาฬสินธุ์	North-East
Phon Bok	โพนบก	Phon Sawan	โพนสวรรค์	Nakhon Phanom	นครพนม	North-East
Phon Chan	โพนจาน	Phon Sawan	โพนสวรรค์	Nakhon Phanom	นครพนม	North-East
Phon Charoen	พรเจริญ	Phon Charoen	พรเจริญ	Bueng Kan	บึงกาฬ	North-East
Phon Charoen	พรเจริญ	Phon Charoen	พรเจริญ	Nong Khai	หนองคาย	North-East
Phon Kha	โพนข่า	Mueang Sisaket	เมืองศรีสะเกษ	Sisaket	ศรีสะเกษ	North-East
Phon Kho	โพนค้อ	Mueang Sisaket	เมืองศรีสะเกษ	Sisaket	ศรีสะเกษ	North-East
Phon Khrok	โพนครก	Tha Tum	ท่าตูม	Surin	สุรินทร์	North-East
Phon Khwao	โพนเขวา	Mueang Sisaket	เมืองศรีสะเกษ	Sisaket	ศรีสะเกษ	North-East
Phon Ko	โพนโก	Sanom	สนม	Surin	สุรินทร์	North-East
Phon Krang	พลกรัง	Mueang Nakhon Ratchasima	เมืองนครราชสีมา	Nakhon Ratchasima	นครราชสีมา	North-East
Phon Mueang	โพนเมือง	At Samat	อาจสามารถ	Roi Et	ร้อยเอ็ด	North-East
Phon Mueang	โพนเมือง	Lao Suea Kok	เหล่าเสือโก้ก	Ubon Ratchathani	อุบลราชธานี	North-East
Phon Mueang Noi	โพนเมืองน้อย	Hua Taphan	หัวตะพาน	Amnat Charoen	อำนาจเจริญ	North-East
Phon Ngam	โพนงาม	Buntharik	บุณฑริก	Ubon Ratchathani	อุบลราชธานี	North-East
Phon Ngam	โพนงาม	Nong Han	หนองหาน	Udon Thani	อุดรธานี	North-East
Phon Ngam	โพนงาม	Kosum Phisai	โกสุมพิสัย	Maha Sarakham	มหาสารคาม	North-East
Phon Ngam	โพนงาม	Det Udom	เดชอุดม	Ubon Ratchathani	อุบลราชธานี	North-East
Phon Ngam	โพนงาม	Kamalasai	กมลาไสย	Kalasin	กาฬสินธุ์	North-East
Phon Ngam	โพนงาม	Akat Amnuai	อากาศอำนวย	Sakon Nakhon	สกลนคร	North-East
Phon Ngam	โพนงาม	Khamcha-i	คำชะอี	Mukdahan	มุกดาหาร	North-East
Phon Phaeng	โพนแพง	Muang Sam Sip	ม่วงสามสิบ	Ubon Ratchathani	อุบลราชธานี	North-East
Phon Phaeng	โพนแพง	Akat Amnuai	อากาศอำนวย	Sakon Nakhon	สกลนคร	North-East
Phon Phaeng	โพนแพง	That Phanom	ธาตุพนม	Nakhon Phanom	นครพนม	North-East
Phon Phaeng	โพนแพง	Rattanawapi	รัตนวาปี	Nong Khai	หนองคาย	North-East
Phon Phek	โพนเพ็ก	Mancha Khiri	มัญจาคีรี	Khon Kaen	ขอนแก่น	North-East
Phon Sa	โพนสา	Tha Bo	ท่าบ่อ	Nong Khai	หนองคาย	North-East
Phon Sai	โพนทราย	Phon Sai	โพนทราย	Roi Et	ร้อยเอ็ด	North-East
Phon Sai	โพนทราย	Mueang Mukdahan	เมืองมุกดาหาร	Mukdahan	มุกดาหาร	North-East
Phon Samran	พรสำราญ	Khu Mueang	คูเมือง	Buriram	บุรีรัมย์	North-East
Phon Sawan	พรสวรรค์	Selaphum	เสลภูมิ	Roi Et	ร้อยเอ็ด	North-East
Phon Sawan	พรสวรรค์	Na Chaluai	นาจะหลวย	Ubon Ratchathani	อุบลราชธานี	North-East
Phon Sawan	โพนสวรรค์	Phon Sawan	โพนสวรรค์	Nakhon Phanom	นครพนม	North-East
Phon Sawang	โพนสว่าง	Mueang Nong Khai	เมืองหนองคาย	Nong Khai	หนองคาย	North-East
Phon Sawang	โพนสว่าง	Si Songkhram	ศรีสงคราม	Nakhon Phanom	นครพนม	North-East
Phon Songkhram	พลสงคราม	Non Sung	โนนสูง	Nakhon Ratchasima	นครราชสีมา	North-East
Phon Sung	โพนสูง	Chai Wan	ไชยวาน	Udon Thani	อุดรธานี	North-East
Phon Sung	โพนสูง	Ban Dung	บ้านดุง	Udon Thani	อุดรธานี	North-East
Phon Sung	โพนสูง	Pathum Rat	ปทุมรัตต์	Roi Et	ร้อยเอ็ด	North-East
Phon Sung	โพนสูง	Dan Sai	ด่านซ้าย	Loei	เลย	North-East
Phon Sung	โพนสูง	Sawang Daen Din	สว่างแดนดิน	Sakon Nakhon	สกลนคร	North-East
Phon Thong	โพนทอง	Ban Mi	บ้านหมี่	Lopburi	ลพบุรี	Central
Phon Thong	โพนทอง	Chiang Yuen	เชียงยืน	Maha Sarakham	มหาสารคาม	North-East
Phon Thong	โพนทอง	Mueang Kalasin	เมืองกาฬสินธุ์	Kalasin	กาฬสินธุ์	North-East
Phon Thong	โพนทอง	Sida	สีดา	Nakhon Ratchasima	นครราชสีมา	North-East
Phon Thong	โพนทอง	Senangkhanikhom	เสนางคนิคม	Amnat Charoen	อำนาจเจริญ	North-East
Phon Thong	โพนทอง	Renu Nakhon	เรณูนคร	Nakhon Phanom	นครพนม	North-East
Phon Thong	โพนทอง	Pho Tak	โพธิ์ตาก	Nong Khai	หนองคาย	North-East
Phon Thong	โพนทอง	Mueang Chaiyaphum	เมืองชัยภูมิ	Chaiyaphum	ชัยภูมิ	North-East
Phon Thong	โพนทอง	Ban Phaeng	บ้านแพง	Nakhon Phanom	นครพนม	North-East
Phon Thong	โพนทอง	Nong Khae	หนองแค	Saraburi	สระบุรี	Central
Phon Yang	โพนยาง	Mueang Chan	เมืองจันทร์	Sisaket	ศรีสะเกษ	North-East
Phon Yang	โพนยาง	Wang Hin	วังหิน	Sisaket	ศรีสะเกษ	North-East
Phong Pheng	โผงเผง	Pa Mok	ป่าโมก	Ang Thong	อ่างทอง	Central
Phong Prasat	พงศ์ประศาสน์	Bang Saphan	บางสะพาน	Prachuap Khiri Khan	ประจวบคีรีขันธ์	West
Phong Sawai	พงสวาย	Mueang Ratchaburi	เมืองราชบุรี	Ratchaburi	ราชบุรี	West
Phong Tuek	พงตึก	Tha Maka	ท่ามะกา	Kanchanaburi	กาญจนบุรี	West
Phong	พงษ์	Santi Suk	สันติสุข	Nan	น่าน	North
Phop Phra	พบพระ	Phop Phra	พบพระ	Tak	ตาก	West
Phosa	โพสะ	Mueang Ang Thong	เมืองอ่างทอง	Ang Thong	อ่างทอง	Central
Phosai	โพธิ์สัย	Si Somdet	ศรีสมเด็จ	Roi Et	ร้อยเอ็ด	North-East
Photharam	โพธาราม	Photharam	โพธาราม	Ratchaburi	ราชบุรี	West
Phra Achan	พระอาจารย์	Ongkharak	องครักษ์	Nakhon Nayok	นครนายก	Central
Phra Bat	พระบาท	Mueang Lampang	เมืองลำปาง	Lampang	ลำปาง	North
Phra Bat Na Sing	พระบาทนาสิงห์	Rattanawapi	รัตนวาปี	Nong Khai	หนองคาย	North-East
Phra Bat Wang Tuang	พระบาทวังตวง	Mae Phrik	แม่ริม	Lampang	ลำปาง	North
Phra Borom Maha Ratcha Wang	พระบรมมหาราชวัง	Khet Phra Nakhon	พระนคร	Bangkok	กรุงเทพมหานคร	Central
Phra Bu	พระบุ	Phra Yuen	พระยืน	Khon Kaen	ขอนแก่น	North-East
Phra Chao	พระเจ้า	Chiang Khwan	เชียงขวัญ	Roi Et	ร้อยเอ็ด	North-East
Phra Kaeo	พระแก้ว	Sangkha	สังขะ	Surin	สุรินทร์	North-East
Phra Kaeo	พระแก้ว	Phachi	ภาชี	Phra Nakhon Si Ayutthaya	พระนครศรีอยุธยา	Central
Phra Khanong	พระโขนง	Khet Khlong Toei	คลองเตย	Bangkok	กรุงเทพมหานคร	Central
Phra Khanong Nuea	พระโขนงเหนือ	Khet Watthana	วัฒนา	Bangkok	กรุงเทพมหานคร	Central
Phra Khanong Tai	พระโขนงใต้	Khet Phra Khanong	พระโขนง	Bangkok	กรุงเทพมหานคร	Central
Phra Khao	พระขาว	Bang Ban	บางบาล	Phra Nakhon Si Ayutthaya	พระนครศรีอยุธยา	Central
Phra Khru	พระครู	Mueang Buriram	เมืองบุรีรัมย์	Buriram	บุรีรัมย์	North-East
Phra Klang Thung	พระกลางทุ่ง	That Phanom	ธาตุพนม	Nakhon Phanom	นครพนม	North-East
Phra Lao	พระเหลา	Phana	พนา	Amnat Charoen	อำนาจเจริญ	North-East
Phra Lap	พระลับ	Mueang Khon Kaen	เมืองขอนแก่น	Khon Kaen	ขอนแก่น	North-East
Phra Luang	พระหลวง	Sung Men	สูงเม่น	Phrae	แพร่	North
Phra Ngam	พระงาม	Phrom Buri	พรหมบุรี	Sing Buri	สิงห์บุรี	Central
Phra Non	พระนอน	Mueang Nakhon Sawan	เมืองนครสวรรค์	Nakhon Sawan	นครสวรรค์	Central
Phra Non	พระนอน	Nakhon Luang	นครหลวง	Phra Nakhon Si Ayutthaya	พระนครศรีอยุธยา	Central
Phra Pathom Chedi	พระปฐมเจดีย์	Mueang Nakhon Pathom	เมืองนครปฐม	Nakhon Phanom	นครพนม	North-East
Phra Phloeng	พระเพลิง	Khao Chakan	เขาฉกรรจ์	Sa Kaeo	สระแก้ว	East
Phra Phut	พระพุทธ	Chaloem Phra Kiat	เฉลิมพระเกียรติ	Nakhon Ratchasima	นครราชสีมา	North-East
Phra Phutthabat	พระพุทธบาท	Phra Phutthabat	พระพุทธบาท	Saraburi	สระบุรี	Central
Phra Prathon	พระประโทน	Mueang Nakhon Pathom	เมืองนครปฐม	Nakhon Phanom	นครพนม	North-East
Phra Rak	พระรักษ์	Pathio	ปะทิว	Chumphon	ชุมพร	South
Phra Sing	พระสิงห์	Mueang Chiang Mai	เมืองเชียงใหม่	Chiang Mai	เชียงใหม่	North
Phra Song	พระซอง	Na Kae	นาแก	Nakhon Phanom	นครพนม	North-East
Phra Thaen	พระแท่น	Tha Maka	ท่ามะกา	Kanchanaburi	กาญจนบุรี	West
Phra That	พระธาตุ	Chiang Khwan	เชียงขวัญ	Roi Et	ร้อยเอ็ด	North-East
Phra That	พระธาตุ	Mae Ramat	แม่ระมาด	Tak	ตาก	West
Phra That	พระธาตุ	Na Dun	นาดูน	Maha Sarakham	มหาสารคาม	North-East
Phra That Bang Phuan	พระธาตุบังพวน	Mueang Nong Khai	เมืองหนองคาย	Nong Khai	หนองคาย	North-East
Phra That Pha Daeng	พระธาตุผาแดง	Mae Sot	แม่สอด,	Tak	ตาก	West
Phra Yuen	พระยืน	Phra Yuen	พระยืน	Khon Kaen	ขอนแก่น	North-East
Phraek Ha	แพรกหา	Khuan Khanun	ควนขนุน	Phatthalung	พัทลุง	South
Phraek Nam Daeng	แพรกหนามแดง	Amphawa	อัมพวา	Samut Songkhram	สมุทรสงคราม	Central
Phraek Sa	แพรกษา	Mueang Samut Prakan	เมืองสมุทรปราการ	Samut Prakan	สมุทรปราการ	Central
Phraek Sa Mai	แพรกษาใหม่	Mueang Samut Prakan	เมืองสมุทรปราการ	Samut Prakan	สมุทรปราการ	Central
Phraek Si Racha	แพรกศรีราชา	Sankhaburi	สรรคบุรี	Chai Nat	ชัยนาท	Central
Phrai Bueng	ไพรบึง	Phrai Bueng	ไพรบึง	Sisaket	ศรีสะเกษ	North-East
Phrai Khla	ไพรขลา	Chumphon Buri	ชุมพลบุรี	Surin	สุรินทร์	North-East
Phrai Nok Yung	ไพรนกยูง	Hankha	หันคา	Chai Nat	ชัยนาท	Central
Phrai Phatthana	ไพรพัฒนา	Benchalak	เบญจลักษ์	Sisaket	ศรีสะเกษ	North-East
Phrai Phatthana	ไพรพัฒนา	Phu Sing	ภูสิงห์	Sisaket	ศรีสะเกษ	North-East
Phrai	ไพร	Khun Han	ขุนหาญ	Sisaket	ศรีสะเกษ	North-East
Phrai Wan	ไพรวัน	Tak Bai (Malay: Tabal)	ตากใบ	Narathiwat	นราธิวาส	South
Phran	พราน	Khun Han	ขุนหาญ	Sisaket	ศรีสะเกษ	North-East
Phran Kratai	พรานกระต่าย	Phran Kratai	พรานกระต่าย	Kamphaeng Phet	กำแพงเพชร	Central
Phraya Banlue	พระยาบันลือ	Lat Bua Luang	ลาดบัวหลวง	Phra Nakhon Si Ayutthaya	พระนครศรีอยุธยา	Central
Phraya Thot	พระยาทด	Sao Hai	เสาไห้	Saraburi	สระบุรี	Central
Phrom Buri	พรหมบุรี	Phrom Buri	พรหมบุรี	Sing Buri	สิงห์บุรี	Central
Phrom Phiram	พรหมพิราม	Phrom Phiram	พรหมพิราม	Phitsanulok	พิษณุโลก	Central
Phrom Sawan	พรมสวรรค์	Phon Thong	โพนทอง	Roi Et	ร้อยเอ็ด	North-East
Phrom Sawat	พรหมสวัสดิ์	Phayu	พยุห์	Sisaket	ศรีสะเกษ	North-East
Phrom Thep	พรมเทพ	Tha Tum	ท่าตูม	Surin	สุรินทร์	North-East
Phrommalok	พรหมโลก	Phrom Khiri	พรหมคีรี	Nakhon Si Thammarat	นครศรีธรรมราช	South
Phrommani	พรหมณี	Mueang Nakhon Nayok	เมืองนครนายก	Nakhon Nayok	นครนายก	Central
Phrommat	พรหมมาสตร์	Mueang Lopburi	เมืองลพบุรี	Lopburi	ลพบุรี	Central
Phromnimit	พรหมนิมิต	Takhli	ตาคลี	Nakhon Sawan	นครสวรรค์	Central
Phron	พร่อน	Mueang Yala	เมืองยะลา	Yala	ยะลา	South
Phron	พร่อน	Tak Bai (Malay: Tabal)	ตากใบ	Narathiwat	นราธิวาส	South
Phrong Akat	โพรงอากาศ	Bang Nam Priao	บางน้ำเปรี้ยว	Chachoengsao	ฉะเชิงเทรา	East
Phrong Chorakhe	โพรงจระเข้	Yan Ta Khao	ย่านตาขาว	Trang	ตรัง	South
Phrong Maduea	โพรงมะเดื่อ	Mueang Nakhon Pathom	เมืองนครปฐม	Nakhon Phanom	นครพนม	North-East
Phru Din Na	พรุดินนา	Khlong Thom	คลองท่อม	Krabi	กระบี่	South
Phru Nai	พรุใน	Ko Yao	เกาะยาว	Phang Nga	พังงา	South
Phru Phi	พรุพี	Ban Nà Sản	บ้านนาสาร	Surat Thani	สุราษฎร์ธานี	South
Phru Thai	พรุไทย	Ban Ta Khun	บ้านตาขุน	Surat Thani	สุราษฎร์ธานี	South
Phru Tiao	พรุเตียว	Khao Phanom	เขาพนม	Krabi	กระบี่	South
Phu Din	ภูดิน	Mueang Kalasin	เมืองกาฬสินธุ์	Kalasin	กาฬสินธุ์	North-East
Phu Fai	ภูฝ้าย	Khun Han	ขุนหาญ	Sisaket	ศรีสะเกษ	North-East
Phu Han	ภูห่าน	Si Chomphu	สีชมพู	Khon Kaen	ขอนแก่น	North-East
Phu Ho	ภูหอ	Phu Luang	ภูหลวง	Loei	เลย	North-East
Phu Kha	พุคา	Ban Mi	บ้านหมี่	Lopburi	ลพบุรี	Central
Phu Kha	ภูคา	Pua	ปัว	Nan	น่าน	North
Phu Khae	พุแค	Chaloem Phra Kiat	เฉลิมพระเกียรติ	Saraburi	สระบุรี	Central
Phu Kham	พุขาม	Wichian Buri	วิเชียรบุรี	Phetchabun	เพชรบูรณ์	Central
Phu Kham Chan	พุคำจาน	Phra Phutthabat	พระพุทธบาท	Saraburi	สระบุรี	Central
Phu Kradueng	ภูกระดึง	Phu Kradueng	ภูกระดึง	Loei	เลย	North-East
Phu Krang	พุกร่าง	Phra Phutthabat	พระพุทธบาท	Saraburi	สระบุรี	Central
Phu Laen Chang	ภูแล่นช้าง	Na Khu	นาคู	Kalasin	กาฬสินธุ์	North-East
Phu Laen Kha	ภูแลนคา	Ban Khwao	บ้านเขว้า	Chaiyaphum	ชัยภูมิ	North-East
Phu Lek	ภูเหล็ก	Ban Phai	บ้านไผ่	Khon Kaen	ขอนแก่น	North-East
Phu Luang	ภูหลวง	Pak Thong Chai	ปักธงชัย	Nakhon Ratchasima	นครราชสีมา	North-East
Phu Nam Yot	ภูน้ำหยด	Wichian Buri	วิเชียรบุรี	Phetchabun	เพชรบูรณ์	Central
Phu Ngoen	ภูเงิน	Selaphum	เสลภูมิ	Roi Et	ร้อยเอ็ด	North-East
Phu Ngoen	ภูเงิน	Kantharalak	กันทรลักษ์	Sisaket	ศรีสะเกษ	North-East
Phu Nok Yung	พุนกยูง	Tak Fa	ตากฟ้า	Nakhon Sawan	นครสวรรค์	Central
Phu Pha Man	ภูผาม่าน	Phu Pha Man	ภูผาม่าน	Khon Kaen	ขอนแก่น	North-East
Phu Pha Mok	ภูผาหมอก	Kantharalak	กันทรลักษ์	Sisaket	ศรีสะเกษ	North-East
Phu Po	ภูปอ	Mueang Kalasin	เมืองกาฬสินธุ์	Kalasin	กาฬสินธุ์	North-East
Phu Sang	ภูซาง	Phu Sang	ภูซาง	Phayao	พะเยา	North
Phu Sawan	พุสวรรค์	Kaeng Krachan	แก่งกระจาน	Phetchaburi	เพชรบุรี	West
Phu Sing	ภูสิงห์	Sahatsakhan	สหัสขันธ์	Kalasin	กาฬสินธุ์	North-East
Phu Toei	พุเตย	Wichian Buri	วิเชียรบุรี	Phetchabun	เพชรบูรณ์	Central
Phu Wiang	ภูเวียง	Phu Wiang	ภูเวียง	Khon Kaen	ขอนแก่น	North-East
Phu Wong	ภูวง	Nong Sung	หนองสูง	Mukdahan	มุกดาหาร	North-East
Phuang Phromkhon	พ่วงพรมคร	Khian Sa	เคียนซา	Surat Thani	สุราษฎร์ธานี	South
Phue Yai	ผือใหญ่	Pho Si Suwan	โพธิ์ศรีสุวรรณ	Sisaket	ศรีสะเกษ	North-East
Phueng Daet	ผึ่งแดด	Mueang Mukdahan	เมืองมุกดาหาร	Mukdahan	มุกดาหาร	North-East
Phueng Ruang	ผึ้งรวง	Chaloem Phra Kiat	เฉลิมพระเกียรติ	Saraburi	สระบุรี	Central
Phuet Udom	พืชอุดม	Lam Luk Ka	ลำลูกกา	Pathum Thani	ปทุมธานี	Central
Phukhao Thong	ภูเขาทอง	Sukhirin	สุคิริน	Narathiwat	นราธิวาส	South
Phukhao Thong	ภูเขาทอง	Nong Phok	หนองพอก	Roi Et	ร้อยเอ็ด	North-East
Phukhao Thong	ภูเขาทอง	Phra Nakhon Si Ayutthaya	พระนครศรีอยุธยา	Phra Nakhon Si Ayutthaya	พระนครศรีอยุธยา	Central
Bang Mun Nak	ภูมิ	Bang Mun Nak	บางมูลนาก	Phichit	พิจิตร	Central
Phum Kae	พุ่มแก	Na Kae	นาแก	Nakhon Phanom	นครพนม	North-East
Phumriang	พุมเรียง	Chaiya	ไชยา	Surat Thani	สุราษฎร์ธานี	South
Phunphin	พุนพิน	Phunphin	พุนพิน	Surat Thani	สุราษฎร์ธานี	South
Phutsa	พุดซา	Mueang Nakhon Ratchasima	เมืองนครราชสีมา	Nakhon Ratchasima	นครราชสีมา	North-East
Phutthabat	พุทธบาท	Chon Daen	ชนแดน	Phetchabun	เพชรบูรณ์	Central
Phutthaisong	พุทไธสง	Phutthaisong	พุทไธสง	Buriram	บุรีรัมย์	North-East
Pian	เปียน	Saba Yoi (Malay: Sebayu)	สะบ้าย้อย	Songkhla	สงขลา	South
Piang Luang	เปียงหลวง	Wiang Haeng	เวียงแหง	Chiang Mai	เชียงใหม่	North
Pilok	ปิล๊อก	Thong Pha Phum	ทองผาภูมิ	Kanchanaburi	กาญจนบุรี	West
Ping Khong	ปิงโค้ง	Chiang Dao	เชียงดาว	Chiang Mai	เชียงใหม่	North
Pitu Mudi	ปิตูมุดี	Yarang	ยะรัง	Pattani	ปัตตานี	South
Piya Mumang	ปิยามุมัง	Yaring (Malay: Jamu)	ยะหริ่ง	Pattani	ปัตตานี	South
Pla Ba	ปลาบ่า	Phu Ruea	ภูเรือ	Loei	เลย	North-East
Pla Khao	ปลาค้าว	Mueang Amnat Charoen	เมืองอำนาจเจริญ	Amnat Charoen	อำนาจเจริญ	North-East
Pla Lo	ปลาโหล	Waritchaphum	วาริชภูมิ	Sakon Nakhon	สกลนคร	North-East
Pla Pak	ปลาปาก	Pla Pak	ปลาปาก	Nakhon Phanom	นครพนม	North-East
Plaeng Yao	แปลงยาว	Plaeng Yao	แปลงยาว	Chachoengsao	ฉะเชิงเทรา	East
Plai Bang	ปลายบาง	Bang Kruai	บางกรวย	Nonthaburi	นนทบุรี	Central
Plai Klat	ปลายกลัด	Bang Sai	บางซ้าย	Phra Nakhon Si Ayutthaya	พระนครศรีอยุธยา	Central
Plai Na	ปลายนา	Si Prachan	ศรีประจันต์	Suphan Buri	สุพรรณบุรี	Central
Plai Phongphang	ปลายโพงพาง	Amphawa	อัมพวา	Samut Songkhram	สมุทรสงคราม	Central
Plai Phraya	ปลายพระยา	Plai Phraya	ปลายพระยา	Krabi	กระบี่	South
Plak Nu	ปลักหนู	Na Thawi (Malay: Nawi)	นาทวี	Songkhla	สงขลา	South
Plak Raet	ปลักแรด	Bang Rakam	บางระกำ	Phitsanulok	พิษณุโลก	Central
Plian	เปลี่ยน	Sichon	สิชล	Nakhon Si Thammarat	นครศรีธรรมราช	South
Plong	ปล้อง	Thoeng	เทิง	Chiang Rai	เชียงราย	North
Plong Hoi	ปล่องหอย	Kapho	กะพ้อ	Pattani	ปัตตานี	South
Pluak Daeng	ปลวกแดง	Pluak Daeng	ปลวกแดง	Rayong	ระยอง	East
Po	ปอ	Wiang Kaen	เวียงแก่น	Chiang Rai	เชียงราย	North
Po	เป๊าะ	Bueng Bun	บึงบูรพ์	Sisaket	ศรีสะเกษ	North-East
Po Daeng	ปอแดง	Chonnabot	ชนบท	Khon Kaen	ขอนแก่น	North-East
Po Phan	ปอพาน	Na Chueak	นาเชือก	Maha Sarakham	มหาสารคาม	North-East
Po Phan	ปอภาร (ปอพาน)	Mueang Roi Et	เมืองร้อยเอ็ด	Roi Et	ร้อยเอ็ด	North-East
Po Seng	เปาะเส้ง	Mueang Yala	เมืองยะลา	Yala	ยะลา	South
Pom Prap	ป้อมปราบ	Khet Pom Prap Sattru Phai	ป้อมปราบศัตรูพ่าย	Bangkok	กรุงเทพมหานคร	Central
Pon	ปอน	Thung Chang	ทุ่งช้าง	Nan	น่าน	North
Pong	ปง	Pong	ปง	Phayao	พะเยา	North
Pong	โป่ง	Bang Lamung	บางละมุง	Chonburi	ชลบุรี	East
Pong	โป่ง	Dan Sai	ด่านซ้าย	Loei	เลย	North-East
Pong Daeng	โป่งแดง	Kham Thale So	ขามทะเลสอ	Nakhon Ratchasima	นครราชสีมา	North-East
Pong Daeng	โป่งแดง	Mueang Tak	เมืองตาก	Tak	ตาก	West
Pong Don	ปงดอน	Chae Hom	แจ้ห่ม	Lampang	ลำปาง	North
Pong Hai	ป่งไฮ	Seka	เซกา	Bueng Kan	บึงกาฬ	North-East
Pong Hai	ป่งไฮ	Seka	เซกา	Nong Khai	หนองคาย	North-East
Pong Kham	ป่งขาม	Wan Yai	หว้านใหญ่	Mukdahan	มุกดาหาร	North-East
Pong Nam Ron	โป่งน้ำร้อน	Fang	ฝาง	Chiang Mai	เชียงใหม่	North
Pong Nam Ron	โป่งน้ำร้อน	Pong Nam Ron	โป่งน้ำร้อน	Chanthaburi	จันทบุรี	East
Pong Nam Ron	โป่งน้ำร้อน	Khlong Lan	คลองลาน	Kamphaeng Phet	กำแพงเพชร	Central
Pong Ngam	โป่งงาม	Mae Sai	แม่สาย	Chiang Rai	เชียงราย	North
Pong Noi	ปงน้อย	Doi Luang	ดอยหลวง	Chiang Rai	เชียงราย	North
Pong Nok	โป่งนก	Thep Sathit	เทพสถิต	Chaiyaphum	ชัยภูมิ	North-East
Pong Pa Wai	ปงป่าหวาย	Den Chai	เด่นชัย	Phrae	แพร่	North
Pong Pha	โป่งผา	Mae Sai	แม่สาย	Chiang Rai	เชียงราย	North
Pong Phrae	โป่งแพร่	Mae Lao	แม่ลาว	Chiang Rai	เชียงราย	North
Pong Pueai	โป่งเปือย	Mueang Bueng Kan	บึงกาฬ	Bueng Kan	บึงกาฬ	North-East
Pong Pueai	โป่งเปือย	Bueng Kan	บึงกาฬ	Nong Khai	หนองคาย	North-East
Pong Sa	โป่งสา	Pai	ปาย	Mae Hong Son	แม่ฮ่องสอน	North
Pong Saen Thong	ปงแสนทอง	Mueang Lampang	เมืองลำปาง	Lampang	ลำปาง	North
Pong Sanuk	ปงสนุก	Wiang Sa	เวียงสา	Nan	น่าน	North
Pong Talong	โป่งตาลอง	Pak Chong	ปากช่อง	Nakhon Ratchasima	นครราชสีมา	North-East
Pong Tam	ปงตำ	Chai Prakan	ปราการ	Chiang Mai	เชียงใหม่	North
Pong Tao	ปงเตา	Ngao	งาว	Lampang	ลำปาง	North
Pong Thung	โปงทุ่ง	Doi Tao	ดอยเต่า	Chiang Mai	เชียงใหม่	North
Pong Yaeng	โป่งแยง	Mae Rim	แม่ริม	Chiang Mai	เชียงใหม่	North
Pong Yang Khok	ปงยางคก	Hang Chat	ห้างฉัตร	Lampang	ลำปาง	North
Phra Phutthabat	พระพุทธบาท	Si Chiang Mai	ศรีเชียงใหม่	Nong Khai	หนองคาย	North-East
Pracha Phatthana	ประชาพัฒนา	Wapi Pathum	วาปีปทุม	Maha Sarakham	มหาสารคาม	North-East
Pracha Suk San	ประชาสุขสันต์	Lan Krabue	ลานกระบือ	Kamphaeng Phet	กำแพงเพชร	Central
Prachan	ประจัน	Yarang	ยะรัง	Pattani	ปัตตานี	South
Prachantakham	ประจันตคาม	Prachantakham	ประจันตคาม	Prachin Buri	ปราจีนบุรี	East
Prachathipat	ประชาธิปัตย์	Thanyaburi	ธัญบุรี	Pathum Thani	ปทุมธานี	Central
Prachuap Khiri Khan	ประจวบคีรีขันธ์	Mueang Prachuap Khiri Khan	เมืองประจวบคีรีขันธ์	Prachuap Khiri Khan	ประจวบคีรีขันธ์	West
Pradang	ประดาง	Wang Chao	วังเจ้า	Tak	ตาก	West
Pradu	ประดู่	Samrong Thap	สำโรงทาบ	Surin	สุรินทร์	North-East
Pradu Ngam	ประดู่งาม	Si Thep	ศรีเทพ	Phetchabun	เพชรบูรณ์	Central
Pradu Yuen	ประดู่ยืน	Lan Sak	ลานสัก	Uthai Thani	อุทัยธานี	Central
Prakhon Chai	ประโคนชัย	Prakhon Chai	ประโคนชัย	Buriram	บุรีรัมย์	North-East
Prakop	ประกอบ	Na Thawi (Malay: Nawi)	นาทวี	Songkhla	สงขลา	South
Pran Buri	ปราณบุรี	Pran Buri	ปราณบุรี	Prachuap Khiri Khan	ประจวบคีรีขันธ์	West
Prang Mu	ปรางหมู่	Mueang Phatthalung	เมืองพัทลุง	Phatthalung	พัทลุง	South
Prangphle	ปรังเผล	Sangkhla Buri	สังขละบุรี	Kanchanaburi	กาญจนบุรี	West
Pranit	ประณีต	Khao Saming	เขาสมิง	Trat	ตราด	East
Prasat	ปราสาท	Huai Thap Than	ห้วยทับทัน	Sisaket	ศรีสะเกษ	North-East
Prasat	ปราสาท	Khukhan	ขุขันธ์	Sisaket	ศรีสะเกษ	North-East
Prasat	ปราสาท	Ban Dan	บ้านด่าน	Buriram	บุรีรัมย์	North-East
Prasat	ปราสาท	Ban Kruat	บ้านกรวด	Buriram	บุรีรัมย์	North-East
Prasat Sit	ประสาทสิทธิ์	Damnoen Saduak	ดำเนินสะดวก	Ratchaburi	ราชบุรี	West
Prasat Thanong	ปราสาททนง	Prasat	ปราสาท	Surin	สุรินทร์	North-East
Prasat Thong	ปราสาททอง	Khwao Sinarin	เขวาสินรินทร์	Surin	สุรินทร์	North-East
Prasat Yoe	ปราสาทเยอ	Phrai Bueng	ไพรบึง	Sisaket	ศรีสะเกษ	North-East
Prasong	ประสงค์	Tha Chana	ท่าชนะ	Surat Thani	สุราษฎร์ธานี	South
Prasuk	ประศุก	In Buri	อินทร์บุรี	Sing Buri	สิงห์บุรี	Central
Prasuk	ประสุข	Chum Phuang	ชุมพวง	Nakhon Ratchasima	นครราชสีมา	North-East
Prathai	ประทาย	Prathai	ประทาย	Nakhon Ratchasima	นครราชสีมา	North-East
Prathat Bu	ประทัดบุ	Prasat	ปราสาท	Surin	สุรินทร์	North-East
Prathat Bu	ประทัดบุ	Prakhon Chai	ประโคนชัย	Buriram	บุรีรัมย์	North-East
Pratu Chai	ประตูชัย	Phra Nakhon Si Ayutthaya	พระนครศรีอยุธยา	Phra Nakhon Si Ayutthaya	พระนครศรีอยุธยา	Central
Pratu Pa	ประตูป่า	Mueang Lamphun	เมืองลำพูน	Lamphun	ลำพูน	North
Prawet	ประเวศ	Prawet	ประเวศ	Bangkok	กรุงเทพมหานคร	Central
Preng	เปร็ง	Bang Bo	บางบ่อ	Samut Prakan	สมุทรปราการ	Central
Prik	ปริก	Sadao (Malay: Sendawa)	สะเดา	Songkhla	สงขลา	South
Prik	ปริก	Thung Yai	ทุ่งใหญ่	Nakhon Si Thammarat	นครศรีธรรมราช	South
Pru Yai	ปรุใหญ่	Mueang Nakhon Ratchasima	เมืองนครราชสีมา	Nakhon Ratchasima	นครราชสีมา	North-East
Prue	ปรือ	Prasat	ปราสาท	Surin	สุรินทร์	North-East
Prue Yai	ปรือใหญ่	Khukhan	ขุขันธ์	Sisaket	ศรีสะเกษ	North-East
Pua	ปัว	Pua	ปัว	Nan	น่าน	North
Puan Phu	ปวนพุ	Nong Hin	หนองหิน	Loei	เลย	North-East
Pueai	เปือย	Lue Amnat	ลืออำนาจ	Amnat Charoen	อำนาจเจริญ	North-East
Pueai Noi	เปือยน้อย	Pueai Noi	เปือยน้อย	Khon Kaen	ขอนแก่น	North-East
Pueai Yai	เปือยใหญ่	Non Sila	โนนดินแดง	Khon Kaen	ขอนแก่น	North-East
Puek Tian	ปึกเตียน	Tha Yang	ท่ายาง	Phetchaburi	เพชรบุรี	West
Pula Kong	ปุลากง	Yaring (Malay: Jamu)	ยะหริ่ง	Pattani	ปัตตานี	South
Pulo Puyo	ปุโละปุโย	Nong Chik	หนองจิก	Pattani	ปัตตานี	South
Purong	ปุโรง	Krong Pinang (Malay: Kampung Pinang)	กรงปินัง	Yala	ยะลา	South
Phutsa	พุดซา	Mueang Nakhon Ratchasima	เมืองนครราชสีมา	Nakhon Ratchasima	นครราชสีมา	North-East
Puyo	ปูโยะ	Su-ngai Kolok (Malay: Sungai Golok)	สุไหงโก-ลก	Narathiwat	นราธิวาส	South
Puyu	ปูยู	Mueang Satun (Malay: Mambang)	เมืองสตูล	Satun	สตูล	South
Puyut	ปุยุด	Mueang Pattani (Malay: Patani)	เมืองปัตตานี	Pattani	ปัตตานี	South

== See also ==
- Organization of the government of Thailand
- List of districts of Thailand
- List of districts of Bangkok
- List of tambon in Thailand
- Provinces of Thailand
- List of municipalities in Thailand
