= Pa Daet =

Pa Daet (Thai: ป่าแดด) can refer to

- Pa Daet District, Chiang Rai province
- Pa Daet, Pa Daet a subdistrict of Pa Daet district, Chiang Rai province
- Pa Daet, Mae Suai a subdistrict of Mae Suai district, Chiang Rai province
- Pa Daet, Mueang Chiang Mai, a sub-district of Mueang Chiang Mai district, Chiang Mai province
