= Pa Sang =

Pasang or Pa Sang may refer to:

- Pasang (game), a board game from Brunei
- Basang or Pasang, a Tibetan-Chinese politician
- Pasang or pesang, regional names for Durio graveolens

== Places ==
- Pasang-e Bala, Iran
- Pasang-e Pain, Iran
- Pa Sang, Mae Chan, Thailand
- Pa Sang, Lamphun, Thailand
- Pa Sang, Wiang Chiang Rung, Thailand
