= Chiang Rung =

Chiang Rung may refer to:

- Jinghong in China
- Wiang Chiang Rung District in Thailand

== See also ==
- Chiang Hung
