= Rong Chang =

Rong Chang โรงช้าง
- Tambon
- Country: Thailand
- Province: Chiang Rai
- Amphoe: Pa Daet

Population (2018)
  - Total: 4,738
- Time zone: UTC+7 (TST)
- Postal code: 57190
- TIS 1099: 570605

Rong Chang (Thai: โรงช้าง) is a tambon (subdistrict) of Pa Daet District, in Chiang Rai Province, Thailand. In 2018 it had a total population of 4,738 people.

== History ==
The subdistrict was created effective August 7, 1987 by splitting off 8 administrative villages from Pa Daet.

== Administration ==
=== Central administration ===
The tambon is subdivided into 12 administrative villages (muban).

No.	Name	Thai
1.	Ban Pong Sali	บ้านโป่งสลี
2.	Ban San Kong	บ้านสันกอง
3.	Ban Pong	บ้านโป่ง
4.	Ban Rong Chang Tai	บ้านโรงช้างใต้
5.	Ban Rong Chang Nuea	บ้านโรงช้างเหนือ
6.	Ban Den	บ้านเด่น
7.	Ban Don Kaeo	บ้านดอนแก้ว
8.	Ban Si Bang Wan	บ้านศรีบังวัน
9.	Ban Thung Thanalai	บ้านทุ่งธนาลัย
10.	Ban Si Sahamit	บ้านศรีสหมิตร
11.	Ban Pong Si Nakhon	บ้านโป่งศรีนคร
12.	Ban Thung Si Thong	บ้านทุ่งศรีทอง

=== Local administration ===
The whole area of the subdistrict is covered by the subdistrict municipality (Thesaban Tambon) Rong Chang (เทศบาลตำบลโรงช้าง).
