= Khlong Mae Kha =

Coordinates: 18.7771121°N 98.9955363°E

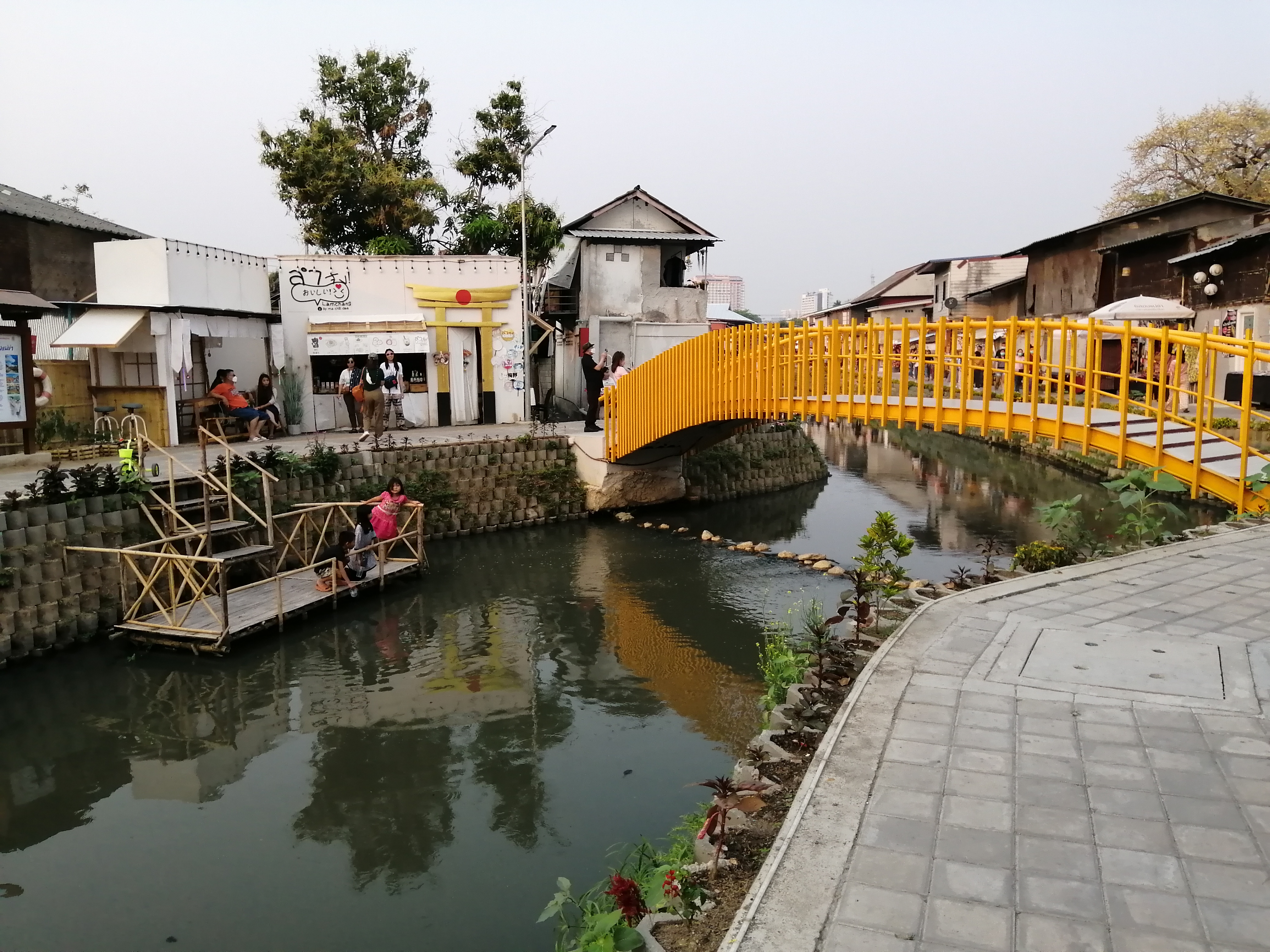
The yellow arch bridge over Khlong Mae Kha in early 2023

Khlong Mae Kha (Thai: คลองแม่ข่า, pronounced [kʰlɔ̄ːŋ mɛ̂ kʰàː]) is a khlong (canal) in Chiang Mai province, northern Thailand.

The waterway acted as an outer moat around the city of Chiang Mai. It is a drainage route to the Ping river. The current flows through Don Kaeo subdistrict, Mae Rim district passing through subdistricts of Pa Daet and Mae Hia in the area of Mueang Chiang Mai district. From there, it flow continues up till it joins the Lam Mueang Kang before emptying into the Ping river in the Pa Daet area, total length approximately 31 km (19.3 mi).

In the past, the water conditions were clean and clear, can be used for consumption. Later it became spoiled and polluted. At present, there are efforts by the Chiang Mai government to revive this canal to return it to its former beauty and cleanliness like Japan's Otaru canal or South Korea's Cheonggyecheon.
