= Si Pho Ngoen =

Si Pho Ngoen ศรีโพธิ์เงิน
- Tambon
- Country: Thailand
- Province: Chiang Rai
- Amphoe: Pa Daet

Population (2018)
  - Total: 1,997
- Time zone: UTC+7 (TST)
- Postal code: 57190
- TIS 1099: 570606

Si Pho Ngoen (Thai: ศรีโพธิ์เงิน, pronounced [sǐː pʰōː ŋɤ̄n]) is a tambon (subdistrict) of Pa Daet District, in Chiang Rai Province, Thailand. In 2018 it had a total population of 1,997 people.

== History ==
The subdistrict was created effective June 19, 1990 by splitting off 8 administrative villages from San Makha.

== Administration ==
=== Central administration ===
The tambon is subdivided into 8 administrative villages (muban).

No.	Name	Thai
1.	Ban Si Pho Ngoen	บ้านศรีโพธิ์เงิน
2.	Ban Si Mongkhon	บ้านศรีมงคล
3.	Ban Pa Mai Si Lueang	บ้านป่าไม้สีเหลือง
4.	Ban Rong Bong	บ้านร่องบง
5.	Ban Si Phatthana	บ้านศรีพัฒนา
6.	Ban Si Pho Thong	บ้านศรีโพธิ์ทอง
7.	Ban Rong Bong Tai	บ้านร่องบงใต้
8.	Ban Don Sila	บ้านดอนศิลา

=== Local administration ===
The whole area of the subdistrict is covered by the subdistrict municipality (Thesaban Tambon) Si Pho Ngoen (เทศบาลตำบลศรีโพธิ์เงิน).
