= Bo Thong, Uttaradit =

- Tambon
- Interactive map of Bo Thong, Uttaradit
- Coordinates: 17°28′4″N 100°19′56″E
- Country: Thailand
- Province: Uttaradit
- District: Thong Saen Khan District

Population (2005)
  - Total: 12,287
- Time zone: UTC+7 (ICT)

Bo Thong (Thai: บ่อทอง, pronounced [bɔ̀ː tʰɔ̄ːŋ]) is a village and tambon (sub-district) of Thong Saen Khan District, in Uttaradit Province, Thailand. In 2005, it had a population of 12,287 people. The tambon contains 14 villages.
