= Dong Mada =

Coordinates: 19.7237°N 99.7153°E

Dong Mada ดงมะดะ
- Tambon
- Interactive map of Dong Mada
- Country: Thailand
- Province: Chiang Rai
- Amphoe: Mae Lao

Population (2005)
  - Total: 9,642
- Time zone: UTC+7 (Thailand)

Dong Mada (Thai: ดงมะดะ) is a village and tambon (subdistrict) of Mae Lao District, in Chiang Rai Province, Thailand. In 2005, it had a population of 9,642. The tambon contains 18 villages.
