= Nam Phi =

Nam Phi น้ำพี้
- Tambon
- Location within Thailand
- Country: Thailand
- Province: Uttaradit
- District: Thong Saen Khan District

Population (2005)
  - Total: 5,527
- Time zone: UTC+7 (ICT)

Nam Phi (Thai: น้ำพี้, pronounced [ná(ː)m pʰíː]) is a village and tambon (sub-district) of Thong Saen Khan District, in Uttaradit Province, Thailand. In 2005 it had a population of 5,527 people. The tambon contains eight villages.
