= Thung Ko =

Thung Ko ทุ่งก่อ
- Subdistrict
- Country: Thailand
- Province: Chiang Rai
- District: Wiang Chiang Rung

Population (2005)
  - Total: 10,227
- Time zone: UTC+7 (ICT)

Thung Ko (Thai: ทุ่งก่อ) is a village and tambon (sub-district) of Wiang Chiang Rung District, in Chiang Rai Province, Thailand. In 2005 it had a population of 10,227 people. The tambon contains 15 villages.
