= Dong Maha Wan =

Dong Maha Wan ดงมหาวัน
- Sub-district
- Country: Thailand
- Province: Chiang Rai
- District: Wiang Chiang Rung

Population (2005)
  - Total: 6,435
- Time zone: UTC+7 (ICT)

Dong Maha Wan (Thai: ดงมหาวัน) is a village and tambon (sub-district) of Wiang Chiang Rung District, in Chiang Rai Province, Thailand. In 2005, it had a population of 6,435 people. The tambon contains 12 villages.
