= Nong Pa Ko =

Coordinates: 20°10′04″N 100°08′09″E

Nong Pa Ko หนองป่าก่อ
- Subdistrict
- Interactive map of Nong Pa Ko
- Country: Thailand
- Province: Chiang Rai
- District: Doi Luang

Population (2005)
  - Total: 4,635
- Time zone: UTC+7 (ICT)

Nong Pa Ko (Thai: หนองป่าก่อ) is a village and tambon (sub-district) of Doi Luang District, in Chiang Rai Province, Thailand. In 2005 it had a population of 4,635 people. The tambon contains 10 villages.
