= Bua Sali =

Coordinates: 19.8165°N 99.7576°E

Bua Sali บัวสลี
- Tambon
- Interactive map of Bua Sali
- Country: Thailand
- Province: Chiang Rai
- Amphoe: Mae Lao

Population (2005)
  - Total: 4,389
- Time zone: UTC+7 (Thailand)

Bua Sali (Thai: บัวสลี) is a village and tambon (subdistrict) of Mae Lao District, in Chiang Rai Province, Thailand. In 2005, it had a total population of 4,389 people. The tambon contains 12 villages.
