= Chom Mok Kaeo =

Chom Mok Kaeo จอมหมอกแก้ว
- Tambon
- Country: Thailand
- Province: Chiang Rai
- Amphoe: Mae Lao

Population (2005)
  - Total: 6,165
- Time zone: UTC+7 (Thailand)

Chom Mok Kaeo (Thai: จอมหมอกแก้ว) is a village and tambon (subdistrict) of Mae Lao District, in Chiang Rai Province, Thailand. In 2005, it had a total population of 6,165 people. The tambon contains 11 villages.
