= Pa Ngae =

Pa Ngae ป่าแงะ
- Tambon
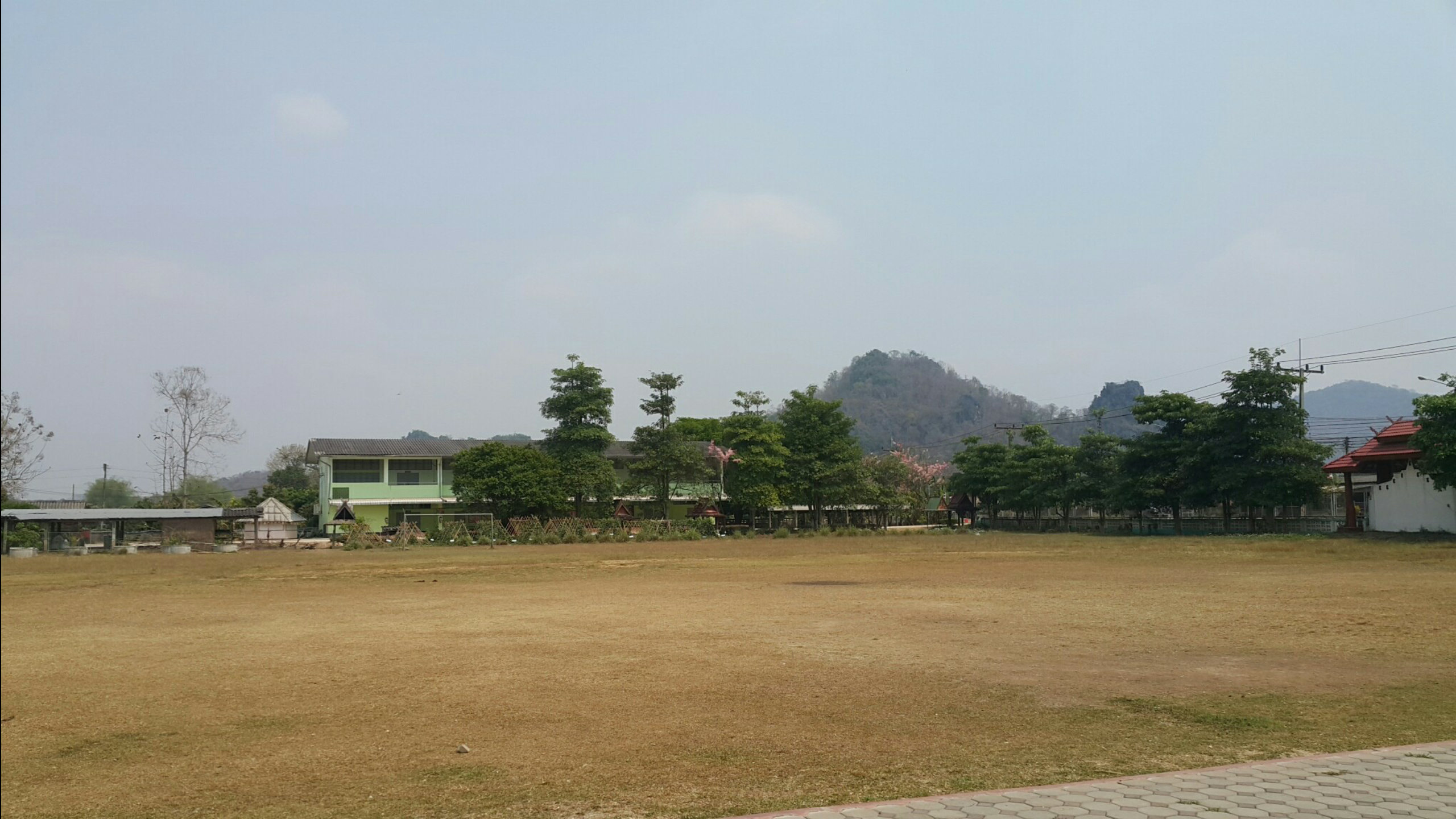
- Samakkhi Rat Rangsan School
- Interactive map of Pa Ngae
- Country: Thailand
- Province: Chiang Rai
- Amphoe: Pa Daet

Population (2018)
  - Total: 7,711
- Time zone: UTC+7 (TST)
- Postal code: 57190
- TIS 1099: 570602

Pa Ngae (Thai: ป่าแงะ) is a tambon (subdistrict) of Pa Daet District, in Chiang Rai Province, Thailand. In 2018 it had a total population of 7,711 people.

== History ==
The subdistrict was created effective August 1, 1970 by splitting off 6 administrative villages from Pa Daet.

== Administration ==
=== Central administration ===
The tambon is subdivided into 18 administrative villages (muban).

No.	Name	Thai
1.	Ban Pa Ngae	บ้านป่าแงะ
2.	Ban Pa Sao	บ้านป่าเส้า
3.	Ban Mai Phatthana	บ้านใหม่พัฒนา
4.	Ban San Makoem	บ้านสันมะเกิ้ม
5.	Ban Lai Rong	บ้านหล่ายร้อง
6.	Ban Pa Tueng	บ้านป่าตึง
7.	Ban Rong Pao	บ้านร่องเปา
8.	Ban Nong Song Hong	บ้านหนองสองห้อง
9.	Ban Thin Charoen	บ้านถิ่นเจริญ
10.	Ban Huai Luek	บ้านห้วยลึก
11.	Ban San Charoen	บ้านสันเจริญ
12.	Ban Santi Suk	บ้านสันติสุข
13.	Ban Ram Chuan	บ้านรำจวน
14.	Ban Si Don Chai	บ้านศรีดอนชัย
15.	Ban Si Rung Rueang	บ้านศรีรุ่งเรือง
16.	Ban Samakkhi	บ้านสามัคคี
17.	Ban Chai Mongkhon	บ้านชัยมงคล
18.	Ban Mai Charoen	บ้านใหม่เจริญ

=== Local administration ===
The whole area of the subdistrict is covered by the subdistrict municipality (Thesaban Tambon) Pa Ngae (เทศบาลตำบลป่าแงะ).
