= Pathum =

Pathum is a given name. Notable people with the name include:

- Pathum Dilshan (born 1991), Sri Lankan cricketer
- Pathum Madusanka (born 1996), Sri Lankan cricketer
- Pathum Nissanka (born 1998), Sri Lankan cricketer

== See also ==
- Pathum Thani (disambiguation)
