= Ban Pla Khao =

Coordinates: 15°45′20.6″N 104°46′39.4″E

Ban Pla Khao is a village in Tambon Pla Khao, Thailand, 20 kilometres from Amnat Charoen city. It was founded by the Phu Thai ethnic group 200 years ago. The village is known for its mo lam performances, which feature dancing and traditional music. Besides conserving the traditional performance, some groups in the town have developed contemporary styles. They perform countrywide and earn much money. Mo Lam's performance of Ban Pla Khao was awarded Amnat Charoen’s OTOP (One Tambon One Product).
