= San Makha =

San Makha สันมะค่า
- Tambon
- Country: Thailand
- Province: Chiang Rai
- Amphoe: Pa Daet

Population (2018)
  - Total: 5,221
- Time zone: UTC+7 (TST)
- Postal code: 57190
- TIS 1099: 570603

San Makha (Thai: สันมะค่า) is a tambon (subdistrict) of Pa Daet District, in Chiang Rai Province, Thailand. In 2018 it had a total population of 5,221 people.

== History ==
The subdistrict was created effective August 1, 1970 by splitting off 3 administrative villages from Pa Daet.

== Administration ==
=== Central administration ===
The tambon is subdivided into 9 administrative villages (muban).

| No. | Name | Thai |
|---|---|---|
| 1. | Ban San Makha | บ้านสันมะค่า |
| 2. | Ban Wang Pha | บ้านวังผา |
| 3. | Ban San Bua Kham | บ้านสันบัวคำ |
| 4. | Ban Santi Tham | บ้านสันติธรรม |
| 5. | Ban Wang Noi | บ้านวังน้อย |
| 6. | Ban Wang Uan | บ้านวังอวน |
| 7. | Ban San Pa Kham | บ้านสันป่าคาม |
| 8. | Ban Wang Sila | บ้านวังศิลา |
| 9. | Ban Wang Saeng Thong | บ้านวังแสงทอง |

=== Local administration ===
The whole area of the subdistrict is covered by the subdistrict municipality (Thesaban Tambon) San Makha (เทศบาลตำบลสันมะค่า).
