= Pla Khao =

Coordinates: 15°45′47″N 104°46′24″E

Pla Khao ปลาค้าว
- Tambon
- Interactive map of Pla Khao
- Country: Thailand
- Province: Amnat Charoen
- Amphoe: Mueang Amnat Charoen

Population (2018)
  - Total: 5,677
- Time zone: UTC+7 (TST)
- Postal code: 37000
- TIS 1099: 370104

Pla Khao (Thai: ปลาค้าว, pronounced [plāː kʰáːw]) is a tambon (subdistrict) of Mueang Amnat Charoen District, in Amnat Charoen Province, Thailand. In 2016 it had a total population of 5,682 people.

== Administration ==
=== Central administration ===
The tambon is subdivided into 12 administrative villages (muban).

No.	Name	Thai
1.	Ban Pla Khao	บ้านปลาค้าว
2.	Ban Pla Khao	บ้านปลาค้าว
3.	Ban Pla Khao	บ้านปลาค้าว
4.	Ban Nong Nam Thiang	บ้านหนองนำเที่ยง
5.	Ban Khok Kong	บ้านโคกก่อง
6.	Ban Na Di	บ้านนาดี
7.	Ban Thon Yai	บ้านถ่อนใหญ่
8.	Ban Thon Yai	บ้านถ่อนใหญ่
9.	Ban Don Ko	บ้านดอนก่อ
10.	Ban Pla Khao	บ้านปลาค้าว
11.	Ban Khok Nakhon	บ้านโคกนคร
12.	Ban Non Sung	บ้านโนนสูง

=== Local administration ===
The whole area of the subdistrict is covered by the subdistrict administrative organization (SAO) Pla Khao (องค์การบริหารส่วนตำบลปลาค้าว).
