= Doi Luang district =

Doi Luang ดอยหลวง
- District
- District location in Chiang Rai province
- Coordinates: 20°7′6″N 100°6′0″E
- Country: Thailand
- Province: Chiang Rai
- Seat: Pong Noi

Area
  - Total: 223.0 km^{2} (86.1 sq mi)

Population (2005)
  - Total: 19,356
  - Density: 86.8/km^{2} (225/sq mi)
- Time zone: UTC+7 (ICT)
- Postal code: 57110
- Geocode: 5718

Doi Luang (Thai: ดอยหลวง, pronounced [dɔ̄ːj lǔa̯ŋ]) is a district (amphoe) in the northern part of Chiang Rai province, northern Thailand.

== History ==
The area of Doi Luang was separated from Mae Chan district and established as a minor district (king amphoe) on 15 July 1996.

On 15 May 2007, all 81 minor districts were upgraded to full districts. With publication in the Royal Gazette on 24 August, the upgrade became official.

== Geography ==
Neighboring districts are (from the north clockwise) Chiang Saen, Chiang Khong, Wiang Chiang Rung, and Mae Chan.

== Administration ==
The district is divided into three subdistricts (tambons), which are further subdivided into 31 villages (mubans). There are no municipal (thesaban) areas. There are three tambon administrative organizations (TAO).

| No. | Name | Thai name | Villages | Pop. |
|---|---|---|---|---|
| 1. | Pong Noi | ปงน้อย | 10 | 5,928 |
| 2. | Chok Chai | โชคชัย | 11 | 8,793 |
| 3. | Nong Pa Ko | หนองป่าก่อ | 10 | 4,635 |
