= Pa Ko Dam =

Coordinates: 19.7928°N 99.7058°E

Pa Ko Dam ป่าก่อดำ
- Tambon
- Interactive map of Pa Ko Dam
- Country: Thailand
- Province: Chiang Rai
- Amphoe: Mae Lao

Population (2005)
  - Total: 6,227
- Time zone: UTC+7 (Thailand)

Pa Ko Dam (Thai: ป่าก่อดำ) is a village and tambon (subdistrict) of Mae Lao District, in Chiang Rai Province, Thailand. In 2005 it had a total population of 6227 people. The tambon contains 13 villages.
