= Phrai Phatthana, Phu Sing =

Phrai Phatthana ไพรพัฒนา
- Tambon
- Phrai Phatthana
- Interactive map of Phrai Phatthana
- Coordinates: 14°23′31.4″N 104°03′31.1″E
- Country: Thailand
- Province: Sisaket
- District: Phu Sing

Government
  - Type: Subdistrict Administrative Organization (SAO)
  - Mayor: Samret Buengphrai
  - Vice mayor: Sgt Theerayuth Maneechote

Area
  - Total: 124.7 km^{2} (48.1 sq mi)

Population (February, 2016)
  - Total: 7,304
  - Density: 44/km^{2} (110/sq mi)
- Time zone: UTC+7 (ICT)
- Postcode: 33140
- Area code: (+66) 02

Phrai Phatthana (Thai: ไพรพัฒนา, pronounced [pʰrāj pʰát.tʰā.nāː]) is a tambon (subdistrict) of Phu Sing District, Sisaket Province, lower northeastern Thailand.

== History ==
Phrai Phatthana was originally part of Huai Ta Mon Subdistrict. It was separated in 1995 and named after the main muban (village) at the time, Prai Phatthana.

== Geography ==
It is located about 20 km (12.4 mi) from Phu Sing downtown, with a total area of 124.7 square kilometers or about 77,937.5 rai.

It has boundaries with the following areas (from the north clockwise): Huai Ta Mon and Dong Rak in its district, Dângrêk Mountains (Thai-Cambodian natural border), and Charat in Buachet District of Surin Province.

Most of the area is undulating, alternating with upland. It is characterized by a slope from south to east. Huai Samran Reservoir is an important local water resource.

== Administration ==
The entire area of Phrai Phatthana is governed by the Subdistrict Administrative Organization Phrai Phatthana (SAO Phrai Phatthana).

It is also divided into 10 villages as follows:

No.	Name	Thai
1.	Ban Na Tambon	บ้านนาตำบล
2.	Ban Khok Daeng	บ้านโคกแดง
3.	Ban Phrai Phatthana	บ้านไพรพัฒนา
4.	Ban Sae Prai	บ้านแซร์ไปร
5.	Ban Wana Sawan	บ้านวนาสวรรค์
6.	Ban O Pang Kho	บ้านโอปังโกว์
7.	Ban Khok Chart	บ้านโคกชาติ
8.	Ban Sae Prai Tai	บ้านแซร์ไปรใต้
9.	Ban Tang Sai Luat	บ้านทางสายลวด
10.	Ban Phrai Phatthana Tawan Ok	บ้านไพรพัฒนาตะวันออก

== Places ==
Phrai Phatthana is known as a place with many tourist attractions. There are two interesting and distinctive places: Wat Phrai Phatthana a local Buddhist temple was first built in 1981. Luang Pu Suang, a Cambodian Buddhist monk who is a former abbot. He liked to help others until he was known as "angel on earth". Nowadays, his body is kept in a glass coffin for people to worship. The building that houses Luang Pu Suang body is outstanding. It was built with red bricks in Khmer style.

Pha Phaya Kouprey, a scenic view point on a cliff of Dângrêk Mountains. Its name "Pha Phaya Kouprey" meaning "a cliff of Kouprey lord", owing there were lots of Koupreys in this area, Kouprey (Bos sauveli) is a completely extinct species of wild cattle today. The folk said that Kouprey was last seen, before it become extinct, here. A big statue of Kouprey was built and installed here in remembrance. The view point is on the side of Highway 2201 (Ban Sae Prai–Chong Sa-Ngam Route). The view down there is Huai Samran which divides two districts of two provinces, Phu Sing in Sisaket and Buachet in Surin. The viewpoint itself is also the location of an ancient stone garden of Dângrêk Mountains.

Moreover, Chong Sa-Ngam Permanent Border Checkpoint, a permanent border crossing point connected to Anlong Veng District, Oddar Meanchey Province, Cambodia. It is in the area as well.
