= Pong Phrae =

Pong Phrae โป่งแพร่
- Tambon
- Country: Thailand
- Province: Chiang Rai
- Amphoe: Mae Lao

Population (2005)
  - Total: 4,356
- Time zone: UTC+7 (Thailand)

Pong Phrae (Thai: โป่งแพร่) is a village and tambon (subdistrict) of Mae Lao District, in Chiang Rai Province, Thailand. In 2005, it had a total population of 4,356 people. The tambon contains 9 villages.
