= Pak Phanang district =

Pak Phanang ปากพนัง
- District
- Pakpanang Old Market, Pak Phanang River View, Pak Phanang Watergate, Laem Talumphuk
- District location in Nakhon Si Thammarat province
- Coordinates: 8°21′30″N 100°12′24″E
- Country: Thailand
- Province: Nakhon Si Thammarat
- Seat: Pak Phanang Fang Tawan-ok

Area
  - Total: 422.5 km^{2} (163.1 sq mi)

Population (2021)
  - Total: 97,153
  - Density: 254.4/km^{2} (659/sq mi)
- Time zone: UTC+7 (ICT)
- Postal code: 80140
- Geocode: 8012

Pak Phanang (Thai: ปากพนัง, pronounced [pàːk pʰā.nāŋ]) is a district (amphoe) of Nakhon Si Thammarat province, southern Thailand.

The name of district means 'sheltered mouth', referring to the mouth of the Pak Phanang River protected from the open sea by a long peninsula.

== History ==
During the thesaphiban administrative reforms the district was created in 1895 with the name Bia Sad (เบิ้ยซัด). On 22 March 1903 it was renamed Pak Phanang, a name first recorded for the area in 1665.

On 25 October 1962 Tropical Storm Harriet hit the district. The low Talumphuk peninsula to the north of the district was completely devastated, and even in the town Pak Phanang itself the storm surge made the water rise four metres. The flooding caused more than 1,000 fatalities and many more homeless. It is the most severe windstorm that has ever occurred in Thailand recorded.

== Geography ==
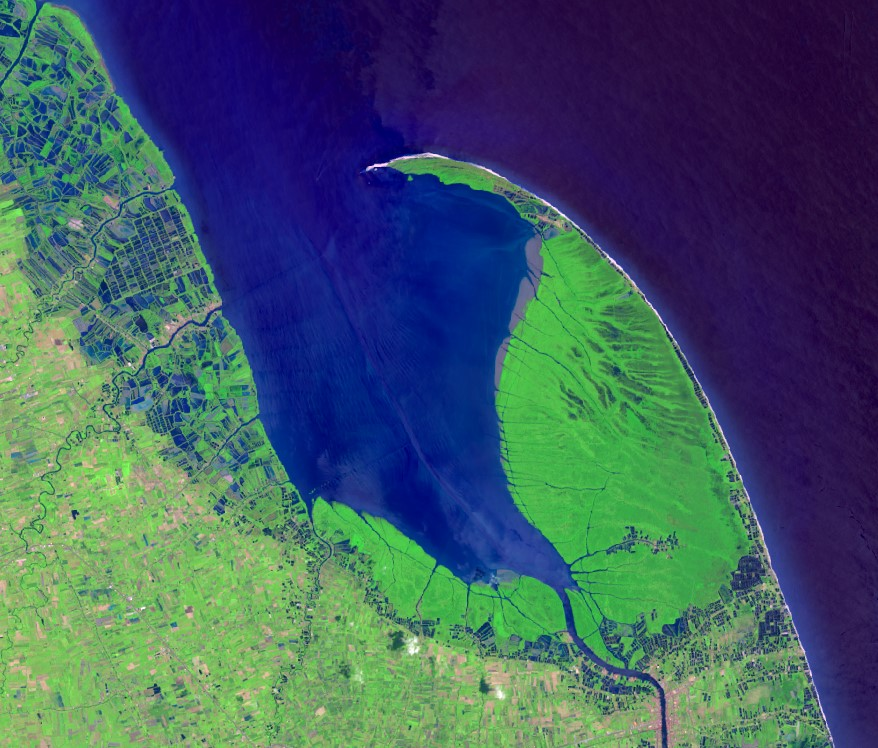
Laem Talumphuk

Neighboring districts are (from the south clockwise): Hua Sai, Chian Yai, Chaloem Phra Kiat and Mueang Nakhon Si Thammarat. To the east is the Gulf of Thailand.

The most striking geographical feature is the long elongated peninsula known as Laem Talumphuk ('toli shad cape'), which is formed of sand deposited by the predominantly northward current interacting with the outflow of the Pak Phanang River (Thai: แม่น้ำปากพนัง). The shallow bay formed by the peninsula is about 3 km wide at the mouth of the river and 10 km at the top of the peninsula. Originally the coastline of the bay consisted of tidal flats and mangrove forests, however a lot of the western coast had been converted into shrimp farms. The government is also building seawalls along much of the coastline in an effort to stop coastal erosion, although poor coastal land use, including prawn farming, is largely to blame for this effect.

== Economy ==
"Bird's nest condos" are said to dominate the skyline of the district. The purpose-built buildings were constructed to encourage nest building by edible-nest swiftlets when the price of edible bird's nests boomed following the 1997 Asian financial crisis. Pak Phanang has more than 500 farm buildings and each can generate income of around 50 million baht per year. As of 2018 the export price of farmed nests is around 80,000 baht per kilo. Exported to China, the price doubles, selling for up to 160,000 baht per kilo. In Thailand, the number of nests extracted from caves is roughly 300 tonnes per year compared with just 100 tonnes from buildings, largely attributable to artificial birdhouses being illegal in Thailand. The business is "grey" and "underground".

== Administration ==
The district is divided into 18 sub-districts (tambons), which are further subdivided into 133 villages (mubans). Pak Phanang is a town (thesaban mueang) which includes tambon Pak Phanang and parts of tambon Hu Long, Pak Phanang Fang Tawan Tok, Pak Phanang Fang Tawan Ok, and Bang Phra. There are a further 17 tambon administrative organizations.

No.	Name	Thai name	Villages	Pop.
1.	Pak Phanang	ปากพนัง	-	13,068
2.	Khlong Noi	คลองน้อย	19	12,002
3.	Pa Rakam	ป่าระกำ	11	4,780
4.	Chamao	ชะเมา	7	3,666
5.	Khlong Krabue	คลองกระบือ	13	6,609
6.	Ko Thuat	เกาะทวด	8	5,614
7.	Ban Mai	บ้านใหม่	8	4,021
8.	Hu Long	หูล่อง	7	6,071
9.	Laem Talumphuk	แหลมตะลุมพุก	4	2,251
10.	Pak Phanang Fang Tawan Tok	ปากพนังฝั่งตะวันตก	4	9,444
11.	Bang Sala	บางศาลา	9	2,735
12.	Bang Phra	บางพระ	4	6,559
13.	Bang Taphong	บางตะพง	4	1,159
14.	Pak Phanang Fang Tawan Ok	ปากพนังฝั่งตะวันออก	8	11,648
15.	Ban Phoeng	บ้านเพิง	8	3,330
16.	Tha Phaya	ท่าพยา	10	5,274
17.	Pak Phraek	ปากแพรก	9	3,885
18.	Khanap Nak	ขนาบนาก	10	5,389

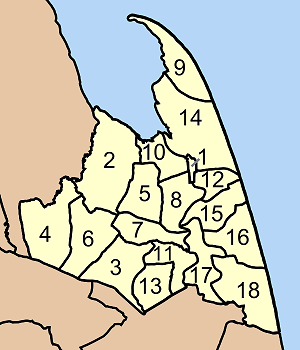
