= Pa Hung =

Coordinates: 19°34′02″N 99°42′05″E

Pa Hung ป่าหุ่ง
- Tambon
- Interactive map of Pa Hung
- Country: Thailand
- Province: Chiang Rai
- District: Phan

Population (2005)
  - Total: 10,138
- Time zone: UTC+7 (ICT)

Pa Hung (Thai: ป่าหุ่ง) is a village and tambon (subdistrict) of Phan District, in Chiang Rai Province, Thailand. In 2005 it had a population of 10138 people. The tambon contains 17 villages.
