= Pong Noi =

Coordinates: 20°06′05″N 100°04′11″E

Pong Noi ปงน้อย
- Subdistrict
- Interactive map of Pong Noi
- Country: Thailand
- Province: Chiang Rai
- Amphoe: Doi Luang

Population (2005)
  - Total: 5,928
- Time zone: UTC+7 (ICT)

Pong Noi (Thai: ปงน้อย) is a village and tambon (sub-district) of Doi Luang District, in Chiang Rai Province, Thailand. In 2005 it had a population of 4,928 people. The tambon contains 10 villages.
