= Mae Lao district =

District of Thailand

Mae Lao แม่ลาว
- District
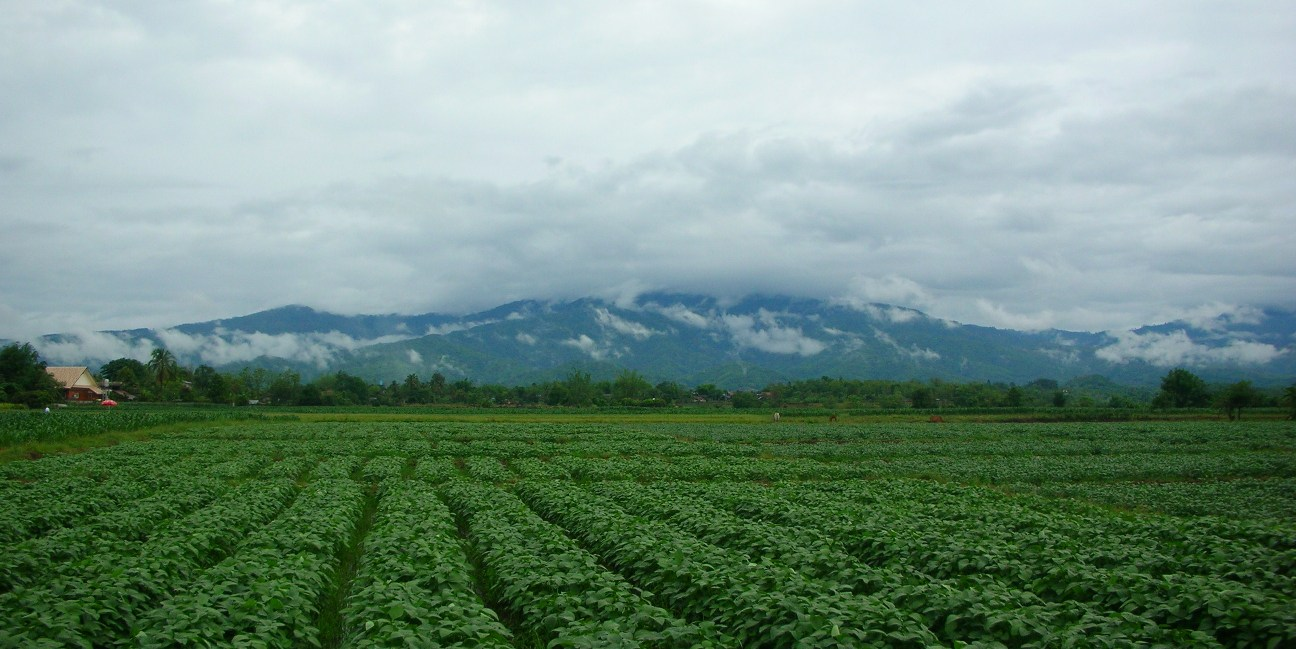
- Field in Chom Mok Kaeo, Mae Lao District, with the Khun Tan Range in the background

- District location in Chiang Rai province
- Coordinates: 19°47′24″N 99°41′59″E
- Country: Thailand
- Province: Chiang Rai
- Seat: Pa Ko Dam

Area
  - Total: 406.0 km^{2} (156.8 sq mi)

Population (2005)
  - Total: 30,779
  - Density: 75.8/km^{2} (196/sq mi)
- Time zone: UTC+7 (ICT)
- Postal code: 57250
- Geocode: 5716

Mae Lao (Thai: แม่ลาว, pronounced [mɛ̂ː lāːw]) is a district (amphoe) in the central part of Chiang Rai province, northern Thailand.

== History ==
The area of Mae Lao district was separated from Mueang Chiang Rai district and established a minor district (king amphoe) on 31 May 1993. It originally consisted of the four tambons: Dong Mada, Chom Mok Kaeo, Bua Sali, and Pa Ko Dam. It was upgraded to a full district on 5 December 1996.

== Geography ==
Neighboring districts are (from the west clockwise): Mae Suai, Mueang Chiang Rai, and Phan of Chiang Rai Province.

The mountains of the Phi Pan Nam Range dominate the landscape of the district, which is named after the Lao River that flows through it

== Administration ==
The district is divided into five sub-districts (tambons), which are further subdivided into 63 villages (mubans). There are two townships (thesaban tambons). Mae Lao covers parts of tambon Dong Mada, and Pa Ko Dam parts of tambons Pa Ko Dam and Chom Mok Kaeo. There are a further five tambon administrative organizations (TAO).

No.	Name	Thai name	Villages	Pop.
1.	Dong Mada	ดงมะดะ	18	9,642
2.	Chom Mok Kaeo	จอมหมอกแก้ว	11	6,165
3.	Bua Sali	บัวสลี	12	4,389
4.	Pa Ko Dam	ป่าก่อดำ	13	6,227
5.	Pong Phrae	โป่งแพร่	9	4,356
