= Pa Khai =

Coordinates: 17°31′N 100°16′E

Pa Khai ป่าคาย
- Tambon
- Interactive map of Pa Khai
- Country: Thailand
- Province: Uttaradit
- District: Thong Saen Khan District

Population (2005)
  - Total: 6,030
- Time zone: UTC+7 (ICT)

Pa Khai (Thai: ป่าคาย, pronounced [pàː kʰāːj]) is a village and tambon (sub-district) of Thong Saen Khan District, in Uttaradit Province, Thailand. In 2005 it had a population of 6030 people. The tambon contains nine villages.
