= Thong Saen Khan district =

Thong Saen Khan ทองแสนขัน
- District
- District location in Uttaradit province
- Coordinates: 17°28′31″N 100°20′1″E
- Country: Thailand
- Province: Uttaradit
- Seat: Bo Thong

Area
  - Total: 745.4 km^{2} (287.8 sq mi)

Population (2005)
  - Total: 33,042
  - Density: 44.3/km^{2} (115/sq mi)
- Time zone: UTC+7 (ICT)
- Postal code: 53230
- Geocode: 5309

Thong Saen Khan (Thai: ทองแสนขัน, Thai pronunciation: [tʰɔ̄ːŋ sɛ̌ːn kʰǎn]) is a district (amphoe) in the southern part of Uttaradit province, northern Thailand.

== Geography ==
Neighboring districts are (from the southwest clockwise) Phichai, Tron, Mueang Uttaradit, Tha Pla, Nam Pat of Uttaradit Province, Chat Trakan and Wat Bot of Phitsanulok province

== History ==
The minor district (king amphoe) was created on 1 July 1983, when four tambon were split off from Tron district. It was upgraded to a full district on 21 May 1990.

== Administration ==
The district is divided into four sub-districts (tambons), which are further subdivided into 45 villages (mubans). The township (thesaban tambon) Thong Saen Khan covers parts of tambon Bo Thong. There are a further four tambon administrative organizations (TAO).

| No. | Name | Thai name | Villages | Pop. |
|---|---|---|---|---|
| 1. | Phak Khuang | ผักขวง | 14 | 9,198 |
| 2. | Bo Thong | บ่อทอง | 14 | 12,287 |
| 3. | Pa Khai | ป่าคาย | 9 | 6,030 |
| 4. | Nam Phi | น้ำพี้ | 8 | 5,527 |
