= Pathum Thani (disambiguation) =

Pathum Thani is a town in central Thailand, directly north of Bangkok.

Pathum Thani may also refer to:

- Pathum Thani province
- Mueang Pathum Thani district
