= Phak Khuang =

Phak Khuang ผักขวง
- Tambon
- Interactive map of Phak Khuang
- Country: Thailand
- Province: Uttaradit
- District: Thong Saen Khan District

Population (2005)
  - Total: 9,198
- Time zone: UTC+7 (ICT)

Phak Khuang (Thai: ผักขวง, pronounced [pʰàk kʰǔa̯ŋ]) is a village and tambon (sub-district) of Thong Saen Khan District, in Uttaradit Province, Thailand. In 2005 it had a population of 9198 people. The tambon contains 14 villages.
