= Wiang Chiang Rung district =

Wiang Chiang Rung เวียงเชียงรุ้ง
- District
- District location in Chiang Rai province
- Coordinates: 20°0′47″N 100°3′25″E
- Country: Thailand
- Province: Chiang Rai
- Seat: Thung Ko

Area
  - Total: 263.3 km^{2} (101.7 sq mi)

Population (2005)
  - Total: 26,531
  - Density: 100.8/km^{2} (261/sq mi)
- Time zone: UTC+7 (ICT)
- Postal code: 57210
- Geocode: 5717

Wiang Chiang Rung (Thai: เวียงเชียงรุ้ง, pronounced [wīaŋ tɕʰīaŋ rúŋ]; Northern Thai: ᩅ᩠ᨿᨦᨩ᩠ᨿᨦᩁᩩ᩶ᨦ, pronounced [wīaŋ tɕīaŋ húŋ]) is a district (amphoe) of Chiang Rai province, northern Thailand.

== Geography ==
Neighboring districts are (from the west clockwise) Mueang Chiang Rai, Doi Luang, Chiang Khong, Phaya Mengrai and Wiang Chai of Chiang Rai Province.

== History ==
The minor district (king amphoe) was established on 1 April 1995, when it was split off from Wiang Chai district . At first named Chiang Rung, it was renamed Wiang Chiang Rung on 1 March 1996.

On 15 May 2007, all 81 minor districts were upgraded to full districts. With publication in the Royal Gazette on 24 August the upgrade became official.

== Administration ==
The district is divided into three sub-districts (tambons), which are further subdivided into 43 villages (mubans). Ban Lao is a township (thesaban tambon) which covers parts of tambons Thung Ko and Dong Maha Wan. There are a further three tambon administrative organizations (TAO).

No.	Name	Thai name	Villages	Pop.
1.	Thung Ko	ทุ่งก่อ	15	10,227
2.	Dong Maha Wan	ดงมหาวัน	12	6,435
3.	Pa Sang	ป่าซาง	16	9,869
