= Pa Daet district =

District of Thailand

Pa Daet ป่าแดด
- District
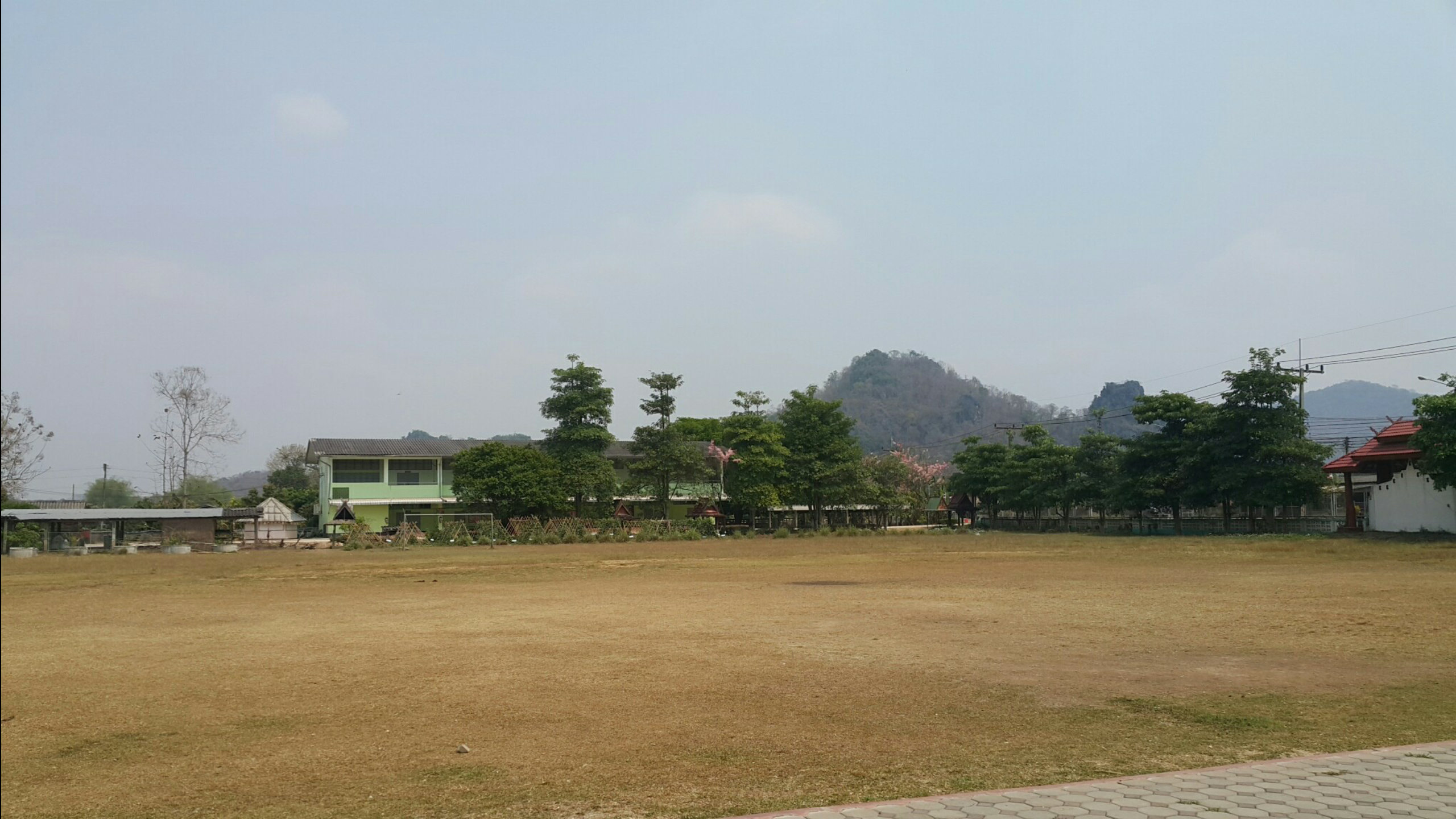
- Samakkhi Rat Rangsarn School in Pa Ngae, Pa Daet

- District location in Chiang Rai province
- Coordinates: 19°30′15″N 99°59′35″E
- Country: Thailand
- Province: Chiang Rai
- Seat: Pa Daet

Area
  - Total: 333.3 km^{2} (128.7 sq mi)

Population (2005)
  - Total: 26,628
  - Density: 79.9/km^{2} (207/sq mi)
- Time zone: UTC+7 (ICT)
- Postal code: 57190
- Geocode: 5706

Pa Daet (Thai: ป่าแดด; IPA: [pàː dɛ̀ːt]) is a district (amphoe) in the southern part of Chiang Rai province, northern Thailand.

== History ==
The area of Pa Daet was originally dense forest of the Phan district. People from other places went there to hunt animals and settle new villages. It was created as the minor district (king amphoe) Pa Daet on 1 June 1969, consisting of the single tambon, Pa Daet. The minor district was upgraded to a full district on 21 August 1975.

== Geography ==
Neighboring districts are (from the west clockwise): Phan, Mueang Chiang Rai, and Thoeng of Chiang Rai Province; Chun, Dok Khamtai, Phu Kamyao, Mueang Phayao, and Mae Chai of Phayao province.

The Phi Pan Nam Mountains dominate the landscape of the district. The important water resource is the Ing River.

== Administration ==
The district is divided into five sub-districts (tambons), which are further subdivided into 58 villages (mubans). There are two townships (thesaban tambons). Pa Daet covers parts of tambon Pa Daet, and Pa Ngae the whole tambon Pa Ngae. There are a further five tambon administrative organizations (TAO).

No.	Name	Thai name	Villages	Pop.
1.	Pa Daet	ป่าแดด	12	6,504
2.	Pa Ngae	ป่าแงะ	18	8,129
3.	San Makha	สันมะค่า	8	5,089
5.	Rong Chang	โรงช้าง	12	4,892
6.	Si Pho Ngoen	ศรีโพธิ์เงิน	8	2,014

Geocode 4 is not used.
