= Pa Daet, Mae Suai =

Pa Daet ป่าแดด
- Tambon
- Country: Thailand
- Province: Chiang Rai
- District: Mae Suai

Population (2016)
  - Total: 11,852
- Time zone: UTC+7 (ICT)
- Postal code: 57180
- TIS 1099: 571002

Pa Daet (Thai: ป่าแดด) is a tambon (subdistrict) of Mae Suai District, in Chiang Rai Province, Thailand. In 2016 it had a population of 11,852 people.

== Administration ==
=== Central administration ===
The tambon is divided into 22 administrative villages (mubans).

No.	Name	Thai
1.	Ban Huai O	บ้านห้วยอ้อ
2.	Ban Rai	บ้านไร่
3.	Ban Pa Daet	บ้านป่าแดด
4.	Ban Pa Kwao	บ้านป่ากว๋าว
5.	Ban Hua Kaen Chan	บ้านท้าวแก่นจันทร์
6.	Ban San Khilek	บ้านสันขี้เหล็ก
7.	Ban Don Sali	บ้านดอนสลี
8.	Ban Hua Fai	บ้านหัวฝาย
9.	Ban Huai Ya Sai	บ้านห้วยหญ้าไซ
10.	Ban Pong	บ้านโป่ง
11.	Ban Chaha	บ้านจะหา
12.	Ban San Khong	บ้านสันโค้ง
13.	Ban San Klang	บ้านสันกลาง
14.	Ban Mai Charoen	บ้านใหม่เจริญ
15.	Ban Thung Ruang Thong	บ้านทุ่งรวงทอง
16.	Ban Nong Bua	บ้านหนองบัว
17.	Ban San Khong Tai	บ้านสันโค้งใต้
18.	Ban Mae Ta Chang	บ้านแม่ตาช้าง
19.	Ban Si Don Rueang	บ้านศรีดอนเรือง
20.	Ban Huai Makaeng	บ้านห้วยมะแกง
21.	Ban Huai Salak	บ้านห้วยสะลัก
22.	Ban Lao Phatthana	บ้านเหล่าพัฒนา

=== Local administration ===
The area of the subdistrict is covered by the subdistrict administrative organization (SAO) Pa Daet (องค์การบริหารส่วนตำบลป่าแดด).
