= Pa Sang, Wiang Chiang Rung =

Pa Sang ป่าซาง
- Subdistrict
- Country: Thailand
- Province: Chiang Rai
- District: Wiang Chiang Rung

Population (2005)
  - Total: 9,869
- Time zone: UTC+7 (ICT)

Pa Sang (Thai: ป่าซาง) is a village and tambon (sub-district) of Wiang Chiang Rung District, in Chiang Rai Province, Thailand. In 2005 it had a population of 9,869 people. The tambon contains 16 villages.
