= Pa Daet, Chiang Mai =

Coordinates: 18°44′46″N 98°58′55″E

Pa Dad ป่าแดด
- Tambon
- Interactive map of Pa Dad
- Country: Thailand
- Province: Chiang Mai
- District: Mueang Chiang Mai

Area
  - Total: 25 km^{2} (9.7 sq mi)

Population (2009)
  - Total: 16,859
- Time zone: UTC+7 (ICT)
- Postal code: 50100
- Geocode: 500110
- Website: http://www.padad.go.th/

Pa Dad (Thai: ป่าแดด) is a tambon (subdistrict) of Mueang Chiang Mai District, in Chiang Mai Province, Thailand. In 2009 it had a population of 16,859 people.

The subdistrict is south of the city of Chiang Mai, on a branch of the Ping River. The Muang Chiang Mai Wetland is on this river in the subdistrict.

== Administration ==
The tambon is divided into 13 administrative villages (mubans).

1.	บ้านแม่ข่าน้อย	Ban Mae Kha Noi
2.	บ้านป่าพร้าวนอก	Ban Pa Phrao Nok
3.	บ้านป่าแดดเหนือ	Ban Pa Daet Nuea
4.	บ้านดอนชัย	Ban Don Khoi
5.	บ้านท่าใหม่อิ	Ban Tha Mai-i
6.	บ้านวังสิงห์คำ	Ban Wang Sing Dam
7.	บ้านป่าแดดใต้	Ban Pa Daet Tai
8.	บ้านเกาะกลาง	Ban Ko Klang
9.	บ้านแม่ข่าใต้	Ban Mae Kha Tai
10.	บ้านอมรนิเวศน์	Ban Amon Niwet
11.	บ้านน้ำบ่อเย็น	Ban Nam Ba Yen
12.	บ้านร้องเรือคำ	Ban Rong Rue Kam
13.	บ้านป่าแดดกลาง	Ban Pa Daet Klang

A small part of the subdistrict is in the city of Chiang Mai; most of the area belongs to the subdistrict municipality (thesaban tambon) Pa Daet.

== History ==
The part of the subdistrict not belonging to the city Chiang Mai became administered by a tambon administrative organization (TAO) in 1995. In 2007 it was upgraded to a subdistrict municipality.
