= Pa Daet subdistrict =

Pa Daet ป่าแดด
- Tambon
- Country: Thailand
- Province: Chiang Rai
- Amphoe: Pa Daet

Population (2018)
  - Total: 6,494
- Time zone: UTC+7 (TST)
- Postal code: 57190
- TIS 1099: 570601

Pa Daet (Thai: ป่าแดด) is a tambon (subdistrict) of Pa Daet District, in Chiang Rai Province, Thailand. In 2018 it had a total population of 6,494 people.

== Administration ==
=== Central administration ===
The tambon is subdivided into 12 administrative villages (muban).

No.	Name	Thai
1.	Ban Pa Daet	บ้านป่าแดด
2.	Ban Mae Phung	บ้านแม่พุง
3.	Ban San Charoen	บ้านสันเจริญ
4.	Ban Wiang	บ้านเวียง
5.	Ban Mae Phung Nuea	บ้านแม่พุงเหนือ
6.	Ban Mai Tai	บ้านใหม่ใต้
7.	Ban Sak Phatthana	บ้านสักพัฒนา
8.	Ban Si Chum	บ้านศรีชุม
9.	Ban San Khong	บ้านสันโค้ง
10.	Ban Sak Tai	บ้านสักใต้
11.	Ban Wiang Doem	บ้านเวียงเดิม
12.	Ban San Khong Phatthana	บ้านสันโค้งพัฒนา

=== Local administration ===
The whole area of the subdistrict is covered by the subdistrict municipality (Thesaban Tambon) Pa Daet (เทศบาลตำบลป่าแดด).
