= Phu Pha Thoep National Park =

National park in Thailand

- อุทยานแห่งชาติภูผาเทิบ
- IUCN category II (national park)
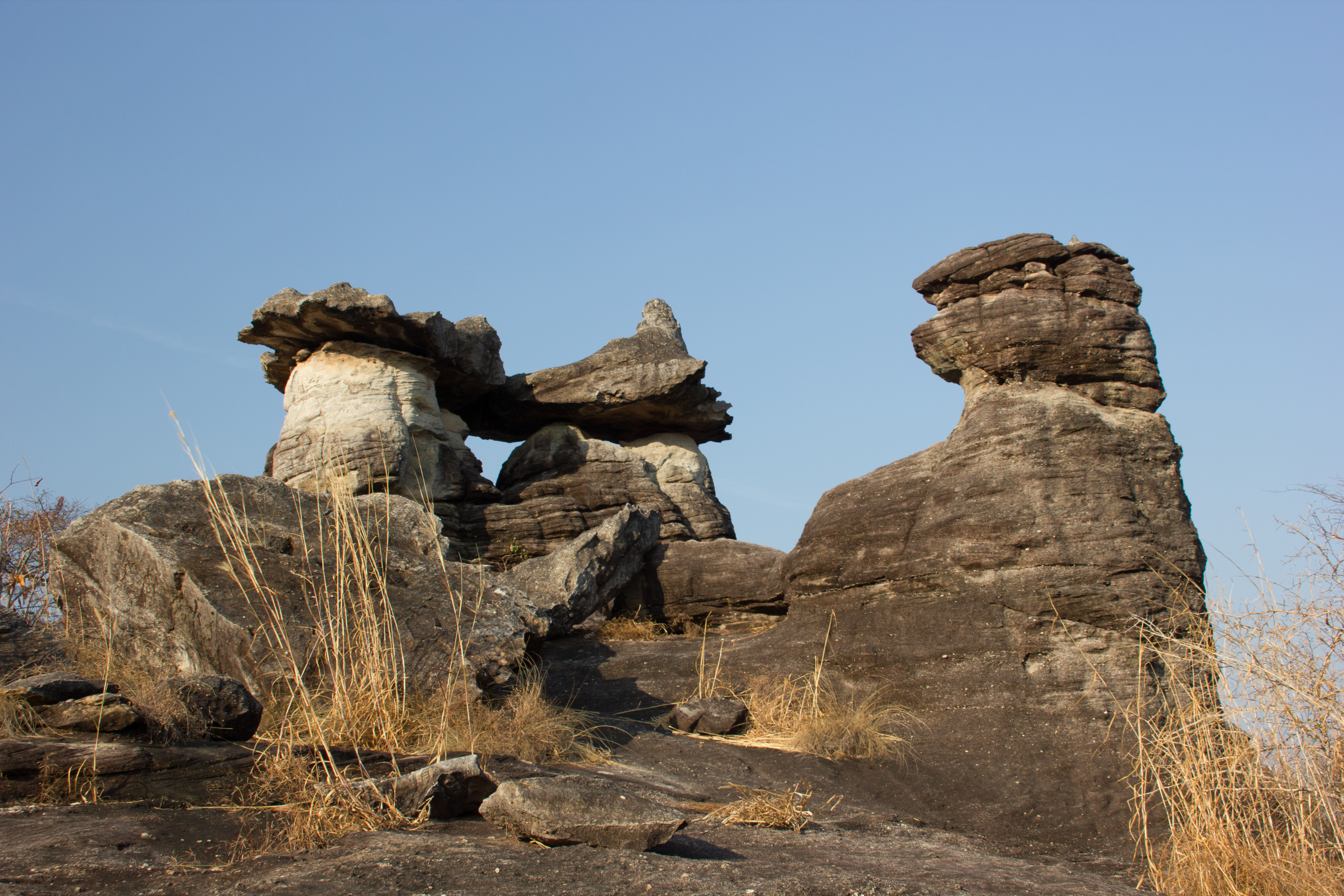
- The park is home to unusual rock formations

- Location within Thailand
- Location: Mukdahan Province, Thailand
- Nearest city: Mukdahan
- Coordinates: 16°26′21″N 104°45′24″E
- Area: 48 km^{2} (19 sq mi)
- Visitors: 47,609 (in 2019)
- Governing body: Department of National Parks, Wildlife and Plant Conservation

Phu Pha Thoep National Park (Thai: อุทยานแห่งชาติภูผาเทิบ), formerly known as Mukdahan National Park (Thai: อุทยานแห่งชาติมุกดาหาร), is a national park in Mukdahan Province, Thailand. This park, one of the country's smallest national parks, is home to unusual rock formations and a cave with ancient hand paintings.

== Geography ==
Phu Pha Thoep National Park is located about 17 kilometres (11 mi) south of Mukdahan in Mueang and Don Tan districts. The park's area is 30,245 rai ~ 48 square kilometres (19 sq mi). The highest point is Phu Jongsi peak at 420 metres (1,400 ft).

== History ==
Phu Pha Thoep National Park is home to a cave with hand paintings estimated to be 3,000 to 5,000 years old. The cave name, Tham Fa Mue Daeng, means "red hand", referring to the red colour of the paintings.

== Attractions ==
Phu Tam Pra is a mainly seasonal waterfall. Above this waterfall is a cave grotto housing a three-foot wide Buddha image along with hundreds of smaller wooden Buddha images and animal models.

The park's namesake mountain Phu Pha Thoep hosts a complex of rocks in eroded formations thought to resemble mushrooms, temples, swans etc. The viewpoint atop Phu Mano affords views of Mukdahan city, the Mekong river and neighbouring Laos.

== Flora and fauna ==
The park features forest types including mixed and deciduous. Tree species include Afzelia xylocarpa, Anisoptera costata, Dalbergia cochinchinensis, Dalbergia oliveri, Irvingia malayana, Lagerstroemia calyculata, Pterocarpus macrocarpus, Shorea roxburghii, Shorea obtusa, Shorea siamensis, Toona ciliata and Dalbergia obtusifolia. Various species of Dillenia, Barringtonia and Cratoxylum are also present.

Animals in the park include northern pig-tailed macaque, sambar deer, golden jackal, common palm civet, northern red muntjac (Muntiacus muntjak vaginalis) and wild boar. The park's many birds include junglefowl, green peafowl and pheasant. In 2005, specimens of a new frog species, Fejervarya triora, were discovered in the park.

== Location ==
Phu Pha Thoep National Park in overview PARO 9 (Ubon Ratchathani)

5) Phu Pha Thoep National Park in overview PARO 9 (Ubon Ratchathani)

	National park
1	Kaeng Tana
2	Khao Phra Wihan
3	Pha Taem
4	Phu Chong-Na Yoi
5	Phu Pha Thoep
6	Phu Sa Dok Bua

	Wildlife sanctuary
7	Buntharik-Yot Mon
8	Huai Sala
9	Huai Thap Than- Huai Samran
10	Phanom Dong Rak
11	Phu Si Than
12	Yot Dom

	Forest park
13	Dong Bang Yi
14	Namtok Pha Luang
15	Pason Nong Khu
16	Phanom Sawai
17	Phu Sing-Phu Pha Phueng

== See also ==
- List of national parks of Thailand
- List of Protected Areas Regional Offices of Thailand
