= Fejervarya triora =

Conservation status
- Least Concern (IUCN 3.1)

Scientific classification
- Kingdom: Animalia
- Phylum: Chordata
- Class: Amphibia
- Order: Anura
- Family: Dicroglossidae
- Genus: Fejervarya
- Species: F. triora

Binomial name
- Fejervarya triora Stuart, Chuaynkern, Chan-ard, and Inger, 2006

Species of amphibian

Fejervarya triora is a species of frogs belonging to the family Dicroglossidae. Its type locality is in Phu Chong-Na Yoi National Park, Ubon Ratchathani Province in the far east of Thailand. It is also known from Mukdahan National Park in Mukdahan Province, and also Pha Taem National Park, Ubon Ratchathani Province. So far, it is only known from eastern Thailand, although it is not unlikely that it occurs in adjacent Laos too. It has been found in a range of forested habitats.

== Description ==
Fejervarya triora is a robustly built frog, females having a body length of up to 60 mm (2.4 in) in snout–vent length (SVL). The only known male measures 45 mm (1.8 in) SVL. The warty upper parts are olive brown with green blotches, the underparts are greyish white. There is an orange spot on the lower half of the tympanum and yellow and black patterning on the legs. The iris is bronze-coloured. When compared to other Fejervarya species found in the region, F. triora can be distinguished from F. raja by its much smaller size and from both F. cancrivora and F. limnocharis by its broader head and the lack of distinct ridges along the back.

The tadpole is mostly dark brown with a yellow line on the lower part of the tail and the front two thirds of the ventral fin pale.
