= Phu Sa Dok Bua National Park =

National park in Thailand

- อุทยานแห่งชาติภูสระดอกบัว
- IUCN category II (national park)
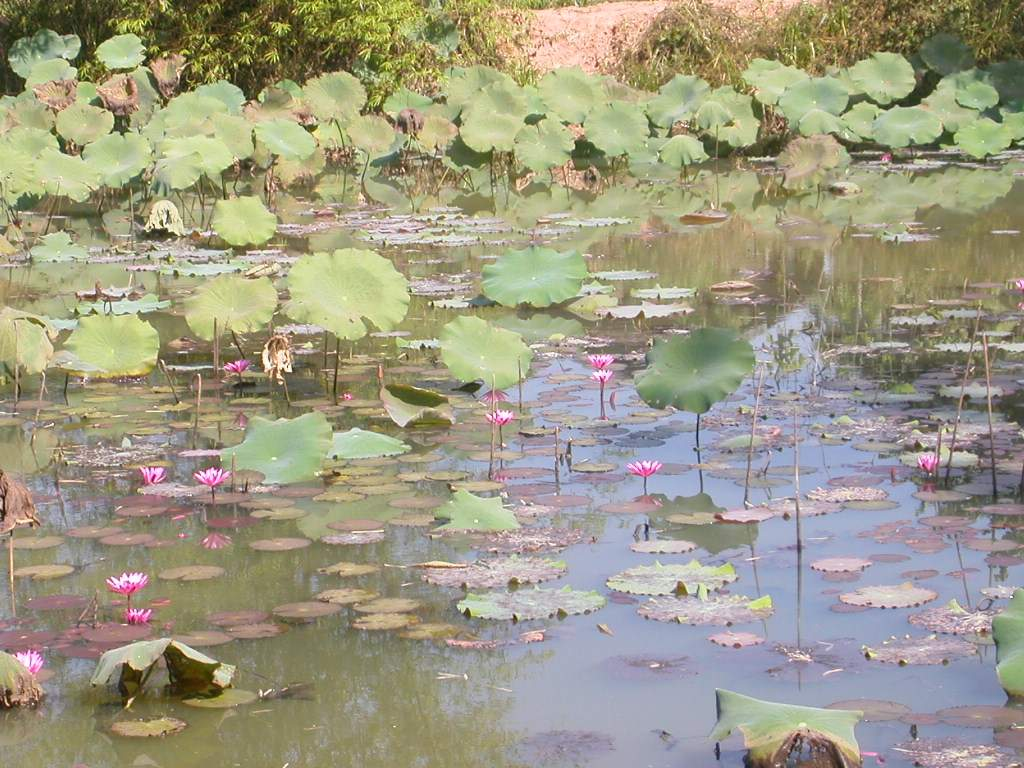

- Location within Thailand
- Location: Thailand
- Nearest city: Mukdahan
- Coordinates: 16°12′10″N 104°48′0″E
- Area: 231 km^{2} (89 sq mi)
- Established: 1992
- Visitors: 1,812 (in 2019)
- Governing body: Department of National Parks, Wildlife and Plant Conservation

Phu Sa Dok Bua (Thai: ภูสระดอกบัว) National Park is a national park that lies in the Amnat Charoen, Mukdahan, and Yasothon Provinces of Thailand. The park's headquarters are located at Amphoe Don Tan, Mukdahan Province.

== Points of interest ==
The park, with an area of 144,375 rai ~ 231 square kilometres (89 sq mi) is covered by dwarf dry dipterocarp forest. There is a 423 m high mountain in it. On the mountaintop there are 11 stone pools which are a few metres wide. Oddly, all of them are occupied by different species of colourful lotus found normally in swamps. Local legend says that nobody planted the lotus, that they grew spontaneously. Thus these pools were named "Phu Sa Dok Bua", literally "the mountain of lotus pools".

Nearby is a huge cave which can accommodate hundreds of people. This cavern served as one of the strongholds of the Communist Party of Thailand during the 1960s. The park has also impressive rock terraces and the corresponding views from 386 m high Phu Pha Hom.

== Location ==
Phu Sa Dok Bua National Park in overview PARO 9 (Ubon Ratchathani)

6) Phu Sa Dok Bua National Park in overview PARO 9 (Ubon Ratchathani)

	National park
1	Kaeng Tana
2	Khao Phra Wihan
3	Pha Taem
4	Phu Chong-Na Yoi
5	Phu Pha Thoep
6	Phu Sa Dok Bua

	Wildlife sanctuary
7	Buntharik-Yot Mon
8	Huai Sala
9	Huai Thap Than- Huai Samran
10	Phanom Dong Rak
11	Phu Si Than
12	Yot Dom

	Forest park
13	Dong Bang Yi
14	Namtok Pha Luang
15	Pason Nong Khu
16	Phanom Sawai
17	Phu Sing-Phu Pha Phueng

== See also ==
- List of national parks of Thailand
- List of Protected Areas Regional Offices of Thailand
