= Khong Chiam district =

Khong Chiam โขงเจียม
- District
- District location in Ubon Ratchathani province
- Coordinates: 15°19′8″N 105°29′44″E
- Country: Thailand
- Province: Ubon Ratchathani
- Seat: Khong Chiam

Area
  - Total: 765.0 km^{2} (295.4 sq mi)

Population (2005)
  - Total: 32,693
  - Density: 32.7/km^{2} (85/sq mi)
- Time zone: UTC+7 (ICT)
- Postal code: 34220
- Geocode: 3403

Khong Chiam (Thai: โขงเจียม, pronounced [kʰǒːŋ tɕīam]) is the easternmost district (amphoe) of Ubon Ratchathani province of Thailand.

== History ==
The area of the district was the central district khwaeng of Mueang Khong Chiam, which is now Si Mueang Mai district. On 1 January 1957 the three tambons Khong Chiam, Huai Yang, and Pho Klang were split off from Khong Chiam to form the Ban Dan minor district (king amphoe). On 11 December 1959 it was elevated to a full district.

On 14 September 1971 the district was renamed "Khong Chiam", while the former district Khong Chiam was renamed "Si Mueang Mai", as the historical center of Mueang Khong Chiam was in this district.

It is thought that the name Khong Chiam comes from the word khong (โขง) meaning 'chief of elephants' or 'herd of elephants' (khlong; โขลง in Thai) and chiam (เจียม) from the word chiang (เจียง), which means 'tribute'. Overall, it can be meaning 'city with elephants live together in large herds'.

== Geography ==
Neighboring districts are (from the south clockwise): Sirindhorn, Phibun Mangsahan, and Si Mueang Mai. To the east across the Mekong River are the Laotian provinces of Salavan and Champasak.

Khong Chiam is the easternmost point of Thailand.

The Pak Mun Dam stops the Mun River before it empties into the Mekong River in this district.

The Kaeng Tana and Pha Taem national parks are in Khong Chiam District.

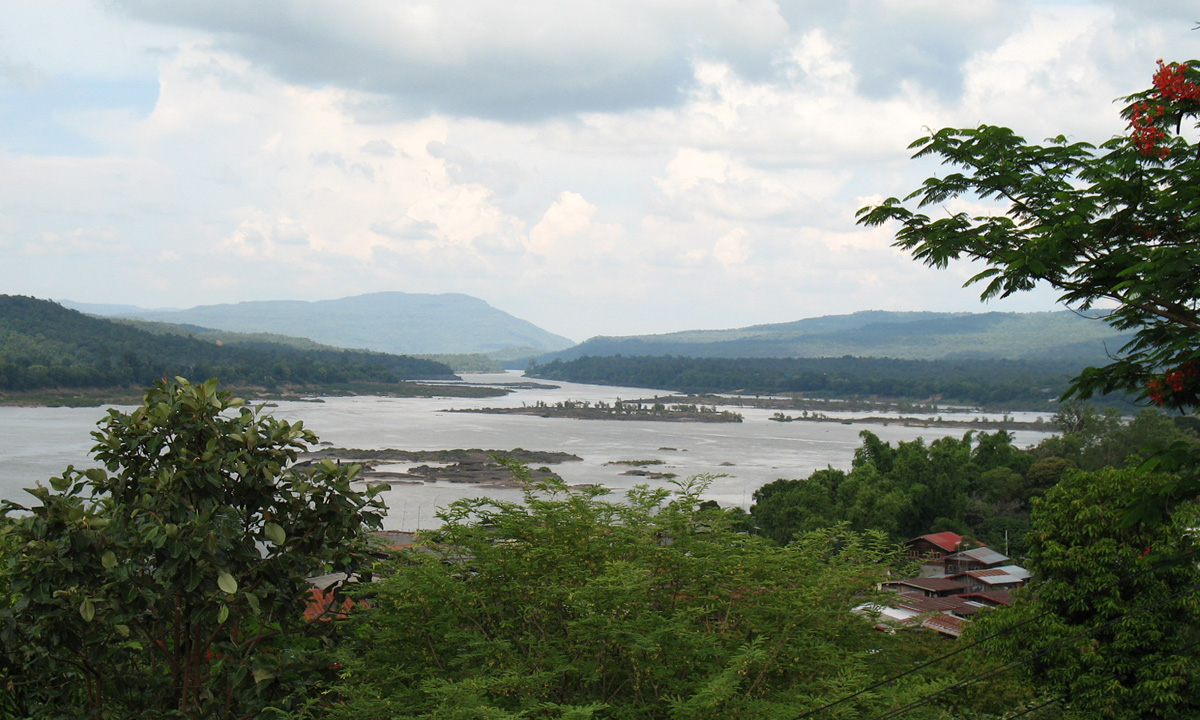
Mun River mouth, Khong Chiam

== Administration ==
The district is divided into five sub-districts (tambons), which are further subdivided into 50 villages (mubans). The township (thesaban tambon) Ban Dan covers parts of tambon Khong Chiam. There are a further five tambon administrative organizations (TAO).

No.	Name	Thai name	Villages	Pop.
1.	Khong Chiam	โขงเจียม	14	8,039
2.	Huai Yang	ห้วยยาง	9	7,457
3.	Na Pho Klang	นาโพธิ์กลาง	9	6,895
4.	Nong Saeng Yai	หนองแสงใหญ่	9	5,104
5.	Huai Phai	ห้วยไผ่	9	5,198
