= Ubon Ratchathani province =

Coordinates: 15°13′46″N 104°51′04″E

Ubon Ratchathani อุบลราชธานี
- Province
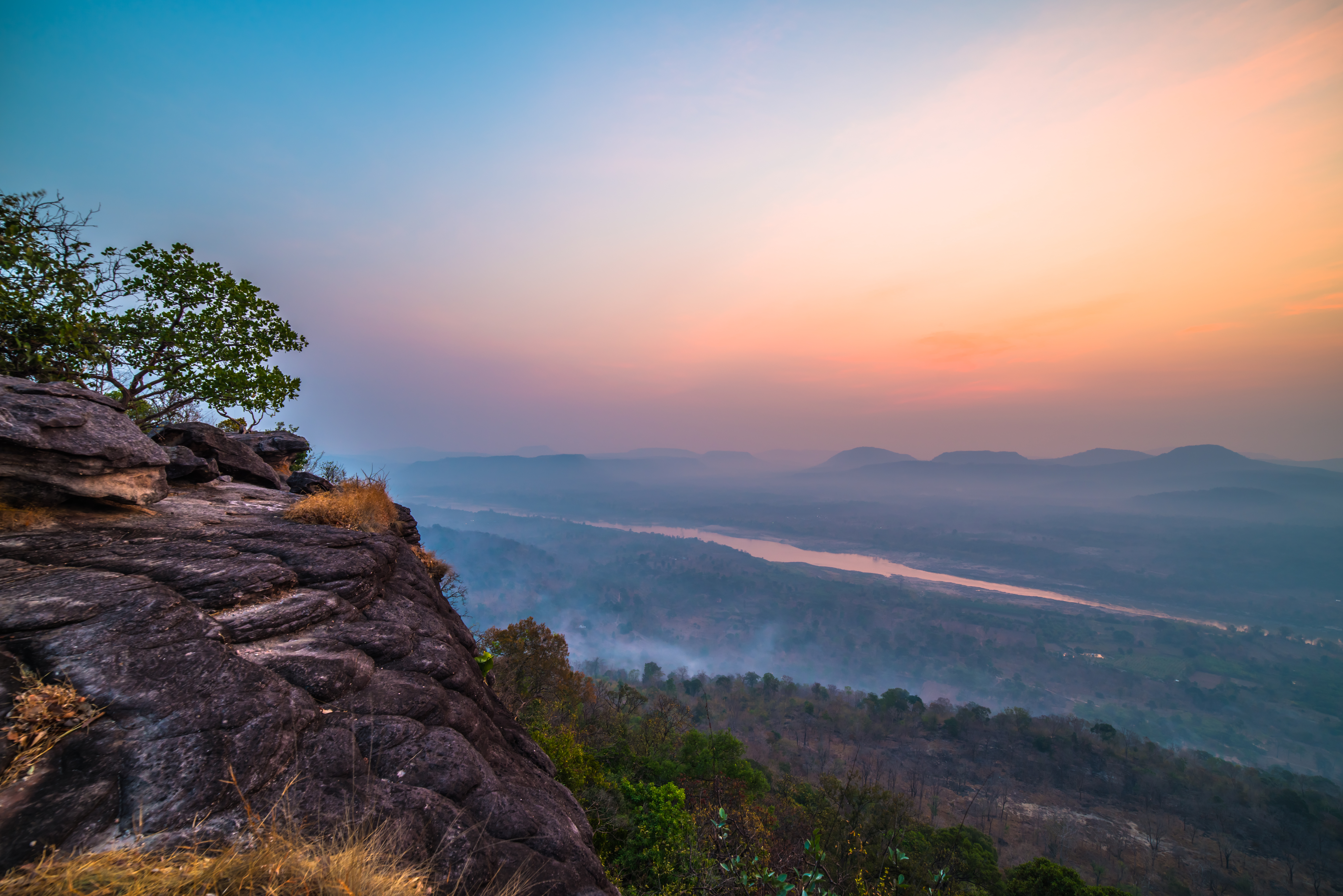
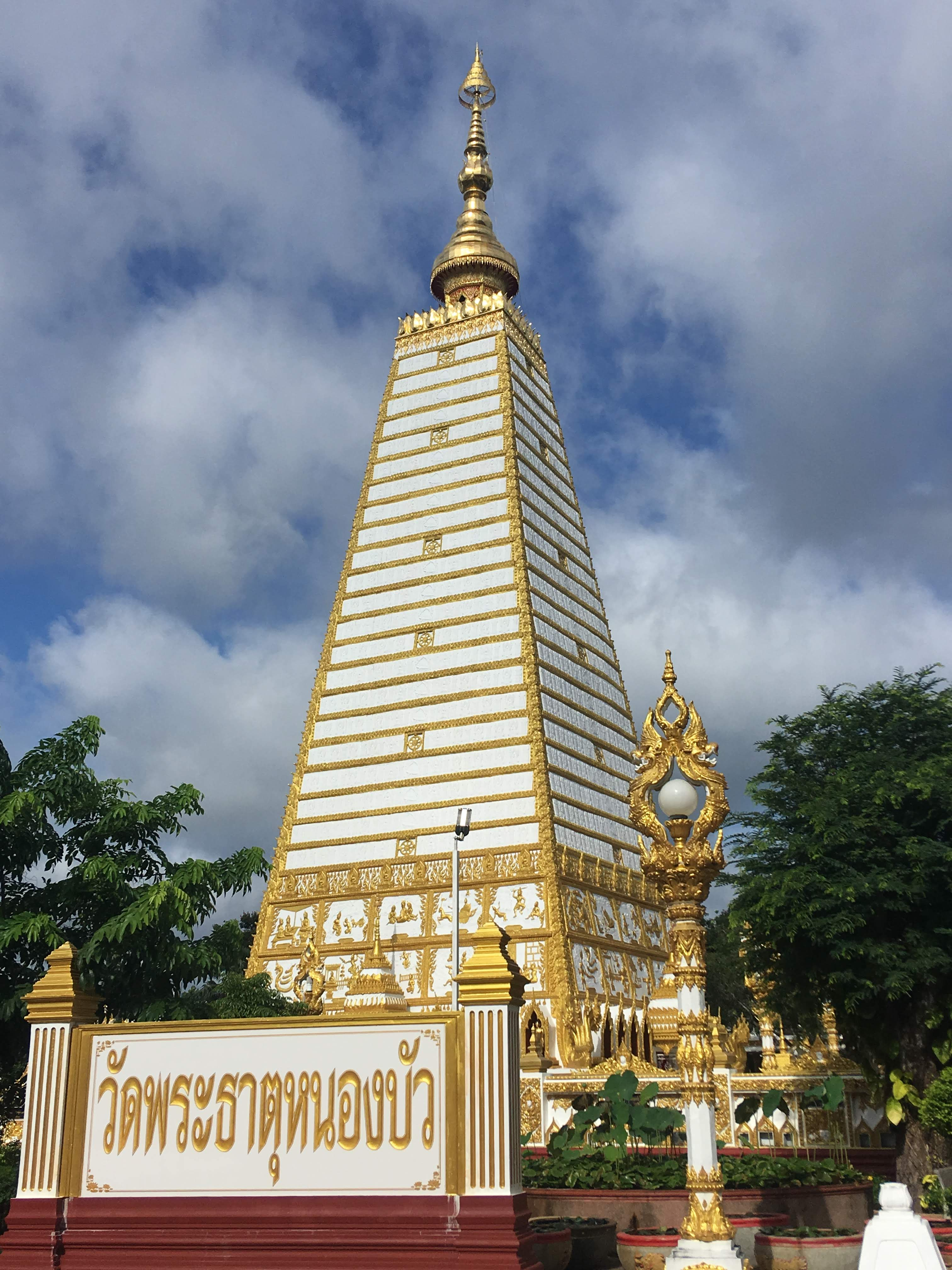
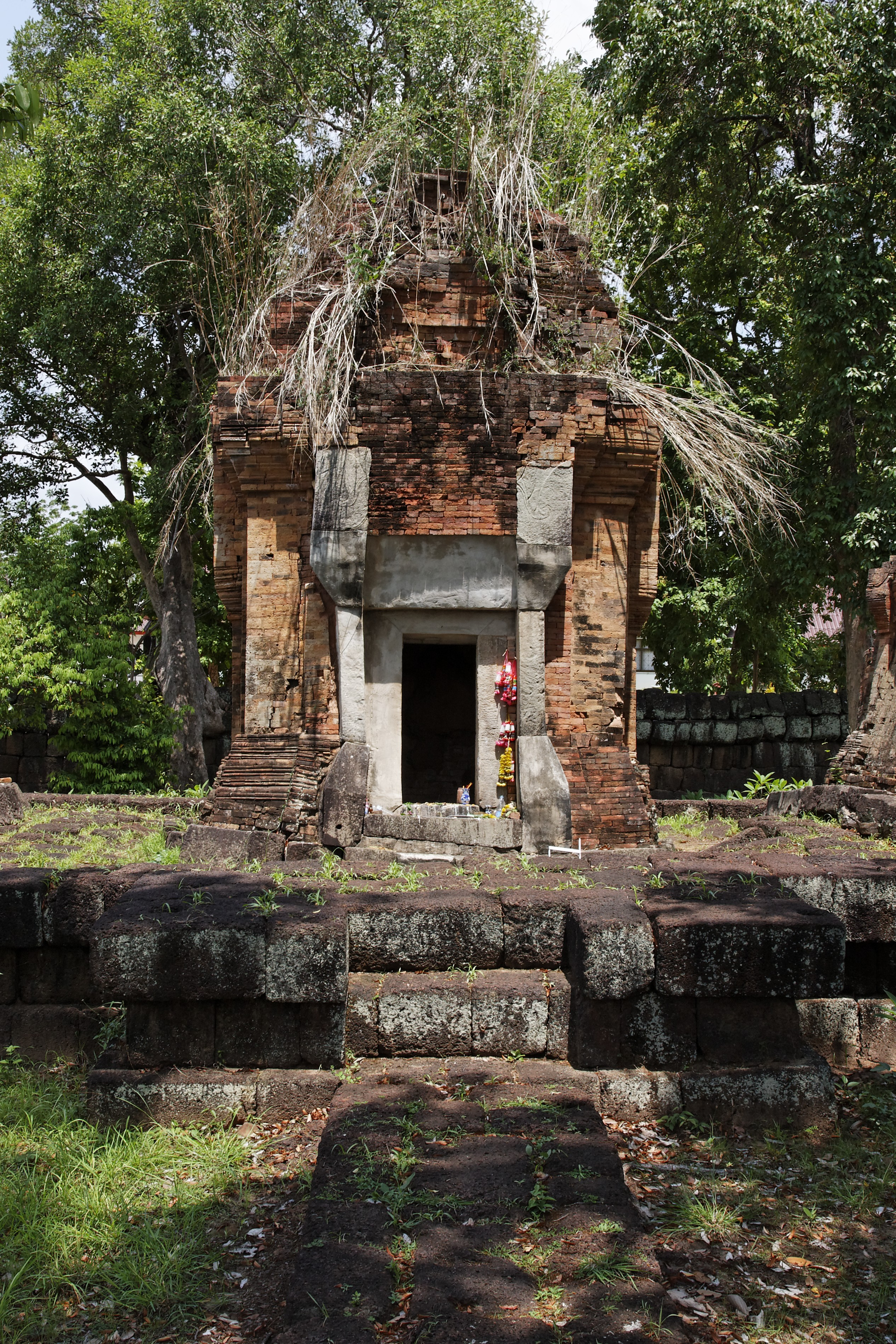
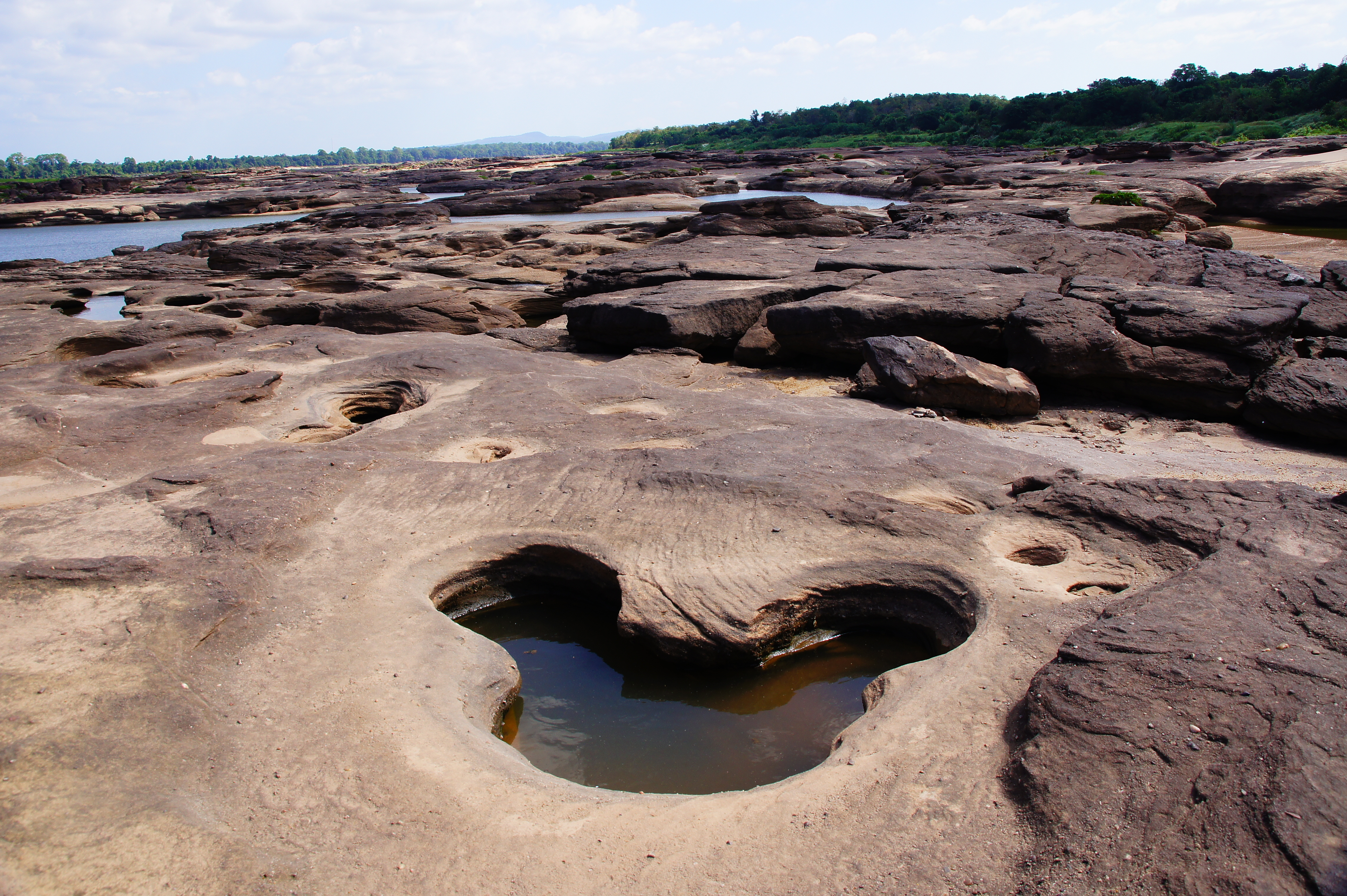
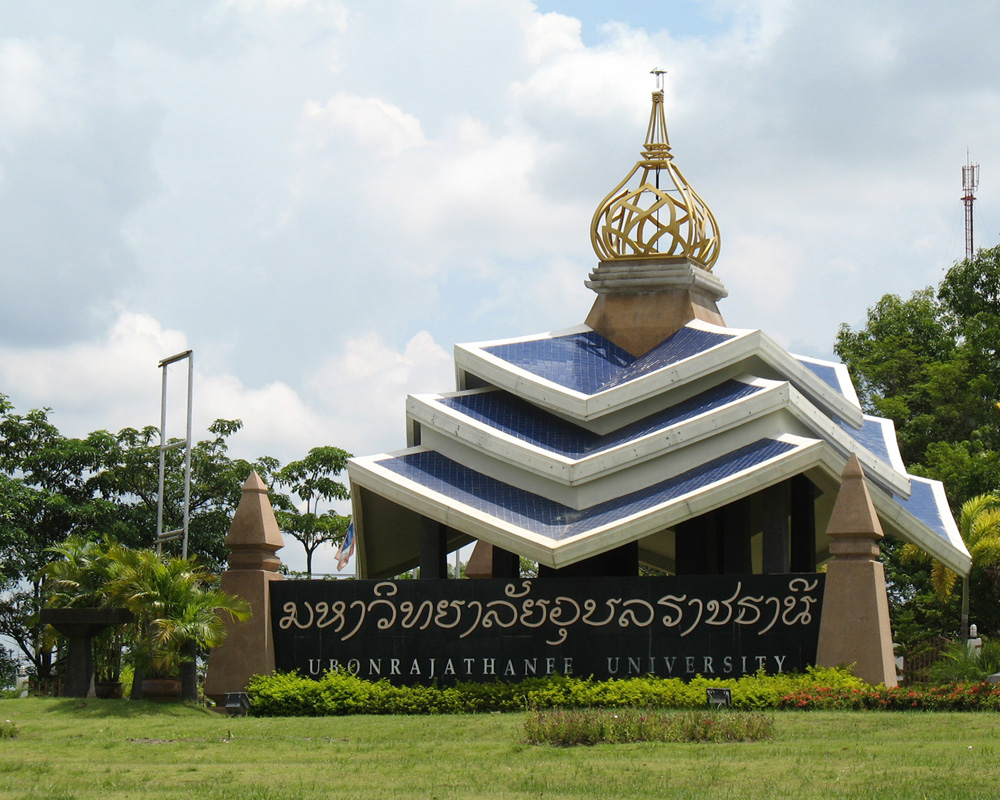
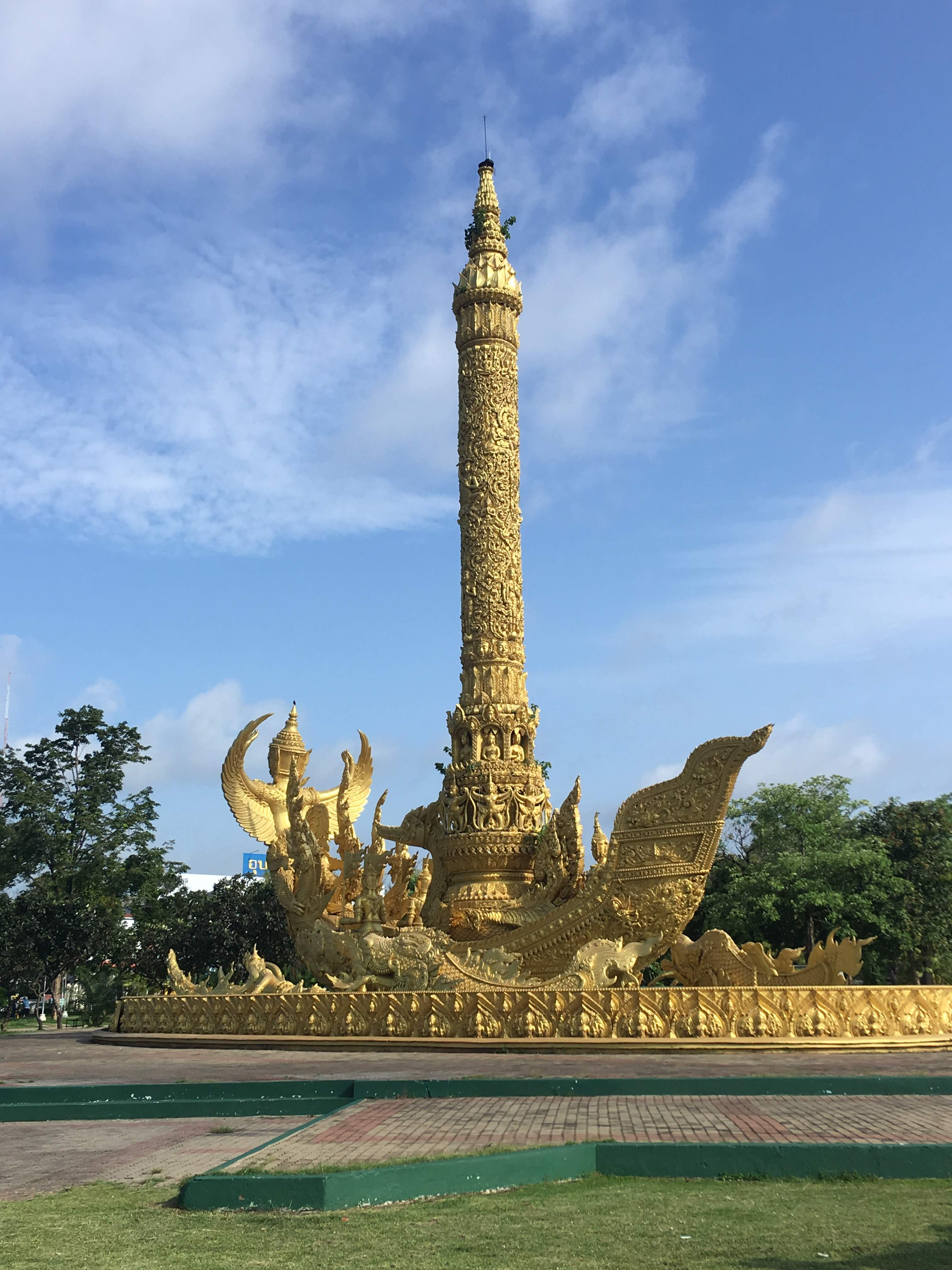
- From left to right, top to bottom : Pha Taem National Park, Wat Phra That Nong Bua, Prasat Ban Ben, Sam Phan Bok, Ubon Ratchathani University, Thung Si Mueang

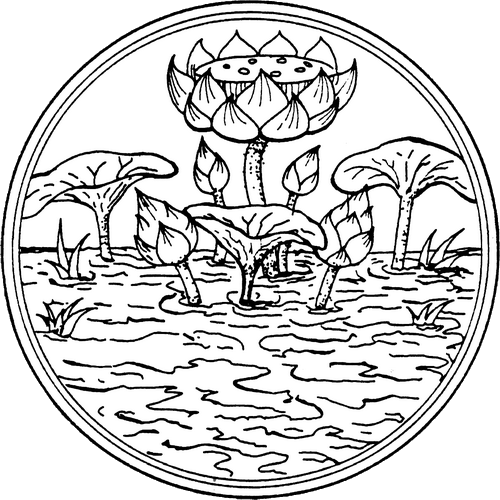
- Flag Seal
- Nicknames: Ubon; Mueang Dokbua (city of lotuses); Tin Bua-ngam (land of gorgeous lotuses)
- Motto: อุบลเมืองดอกบัวงาม แม่น้ำสองสี มีปลาแซ่บหลาย หาดทรายแก่งหิน ถิ่นไทยนักปราชญ์ ทวยราษฎร์ใฝ่ธรรม งามล้ำเทียนพรรษา ผาแต้มก่อนประวัติศาสตร์ ฉลาดภูมิปัญญาท้องถิ่น ดินแดนอนุสาวรีย์คนดีศรีอุบล ("Ubon, the city of beautiful lotuses. Bicoloured river. Delicious fish. Sandy beaches and rocky rapids. Home of the scholars. The people revering Dharma. Beautiful Thain Phansa festival. Prehistoric Pha Taem. Smart local knowledge. Land of the monumental, great peoples of Ubon.")
- Map of Thailand highlighting Ubon Ratchathani province
- Country: Thailand
- Capital: Ubon Ratchathani

Government
  - Governor: Adisak Noisuwan

Area
  - Total: 15,626 km^{2} (6,033 sq mi)
  - Rank: 5th

Population (2024)
  - Total: ▼1,867,942
  - Rank: 3rd
  - Density: 120/km^{2} (310/sq mi)
  - Rank: 41st

Human Achievement Index
  - HAI (2022): 0.6272 "somewhat low" Ranked 60th

GDP
  - Total: baht 120 billion (US$4.0 billion) (2019)
- Time zone: UTC+7 (ICT)
- Postal code: 34xxx
- Calling code: 045
- ISO 3166 code: TH-34
- Website: ubonratchathani.go.th

Ubon Ratchathani Provincial Administrative Organization องค์การบริหารส่วนจังหวัดอุบลราชธานี
- Provincial Administrative Organization
- Interactive map of Ubon Ratchathani Provincial Administrative Organization

Government
  - Type: Local administrative divisions
  - Body: Ubon Ratchathani Provincial Administrative Organization
  - President: Karn Kalptinan
- Website: ubon.go.th

Ubon Ratchathani (Thai: อุบลราชธานี, pronounced [ʔù.bōn râːt.tɕʰā.tʰāː.nīː]; Northeastern Thai: อุบลราชธานี, pronounced [ʔǔ.bōn lâːt.sā.tʰa᷇ː.ni᷇ː]), often shortened to Ubon (อุบลฯ), is one of Thailand's seventy-six provinces. It lies in lower northeastern Thailand (also called Isan). Ubon is about 630 km (390 mi) from Bangkok. Neighboring provinces are (from west clockwise) Sisaket, Yasothon, and Amnat Charoen. To the north and east it borders Salavan and Champasak of Laos, to the south Preah Vihear of Cambodia.

== History ==
The city was founded in the late 18th century by Thao Kham Phong, descendant of Phra Wo and Phra Ta, who escaped from King Siribunsan of Vientiane into Siam Kingdom during the reign of King Taksin the Great. Later Thao Kham Phong was appointed to be "Phra Pathum Wongsa," the first ruler of Ubon Ratchathani. In 1792, Ubon Ratchathani became a province, and was also the administrative center of the monthon Isan.

Until 1972, Ubon Ratchathani was the largest province of Thailand by area. Yasothon was split off from Ubon Ratchathani in 1972, followed by Amnat Charoen in 1993.

Before it became a province. Ubon Ratchathani was the administrative center of the monthon Isan, of which monthon Ubon was split off. In 1925 it became part of monthon Nakhon Ratchasima, with the abolishment of the monthon in 1933 the province became a first level subdivision of the country.

== Symbols ==
The provincial seal shows a lotus flower in a pond. This alludes to the meaning of the name of the province, which translates to 'royal city of the lotus flower'. The provincial flower is the lotus (Nymphaea lotus). The provincial tree is the Yang-na (Dipterocarpus alatus). Black-eared catfish (Pangasius larnaudii) is the provincial aquatic animal.

== Economy ==
Ubon Ratchathani's economy is largely agricultural. It is the nation's leading rice-producing province. It earns more than 10 billion baht a year from rice sales. It is also an important grower of casava.

Around 50% of the workforce in Ubon Ratchathani are in the agricultural sector.

It also generates billions of baht from manufacturing.

Ubon Ratchathani is also along the Meekong with a major crossing into Laos at Chongmek. It also borders Cambodia. This makes it important for both trade and as a tourism gateway.

== Geography ==
At Khong Chiam the Mun River, the biggest river of the Khorat Plateau, joins the Mekong, which forms the northeastern boundary of Thailand with Laos. It is called "Maenam Song Si" or the "Mun River alluvium" because the brown water from Mekong River mixes with the blue water of the Mun. It is about 84 km (52 mi) from Ubon Ratchathani city centre.

The area in the Dângrêk Mountains where the borders of the three countries, Thailand, Laos, and Cambodia meet is promoted as the "Emerald Triangle", in contrast to the "Golden Triangle" in the north of Thailand. "Emerald" refers to the largely intact monsoon forests there. The total forest area is 2,808 km^{2} (1,084 sq mi) or 18 percent of provincial area.

== National parks ==
Ubon Ratchathani boasts the following national parks:

- Phu Chong–Na Yoi National Park is in the mountainous southern region of the province.
- Kaeng Tana National Park is in Khong Chiam District.
- Pha Taem National Park, plateaus and hills dominate the park landscape. The sheer cliffs here are a result of earthquakes. The interesting places in the national park are Pha Taem and Pha Kham. On the cliffs surfaces are numerous prehistoric cave paintings from 3,000 to 4,000 years ago. These paintings depict scenes of fishing, rice farming, figures of people, animals, hands and geometric designs that depict life during the pre-historic time and reflect the ancient lifestyle of the people who lived there.

There are four national parks, along with two other national parks, make up region 9 (Ubon Ratchathani) of Thailand's protected areas. (Visitors in fiscal year 2024)

Phu Chong–Na Yoi National Park	686 km^{2} (265 sq mi)	(127,443)
Pha Taem National Park	340 km^{2} (130 sq mi)	(166,375)
Khao Phra Wihan National Park	130 km^{2} (50 sq mi)	(186,276)
Kaeng Tana National Park	80 km^{2} (31 sq mi)	(29,773)

== Wildlife sanctuaries ==
There are two wildlife sanctuaries, along with four other wildlife sanctuaries, make up region 9 (Ubon Ratchathani) of Thailand's protected areas.

Buntharik–Yot Mon Wildlife Sanctuary	350 km^{2} (140 sq mi)
Yot Dom Wildlife Sanctuary	225 km^{2} (87 sq mi)

Location protected areas of Ubon Ratchathani

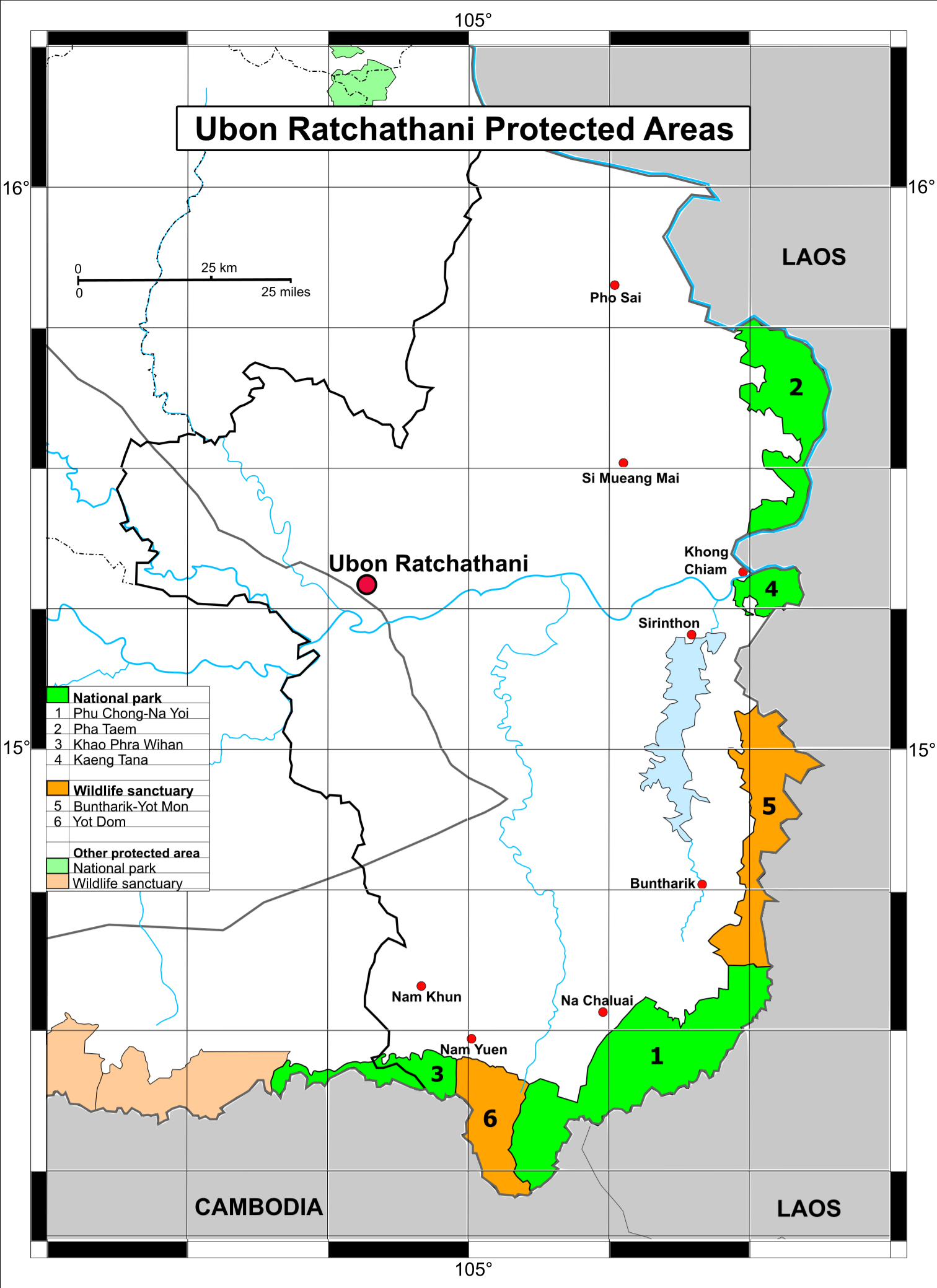
Ubon Ratchathani protected areas

	National park
1	Phu Chong-Na Yoi
2	Pha Taem
3	Khao Phra Wihan
4	Kaeng Tana

	Wildlife sanctuary
5	Buntharik-Yot Mon
6	Yot Dom

== Health ==
The main hospital of Ubon Ratchathani province is Sunpasitthiprasong Hospital.

== Transportation ==
=== Air ===
Ubon Ratchathani is served by Ubon Ratchathani Airport.

=== Rail ===
Ubon Ratchathani Railway Station is the main railway station in Ubon Ratchathani.

== Education ==
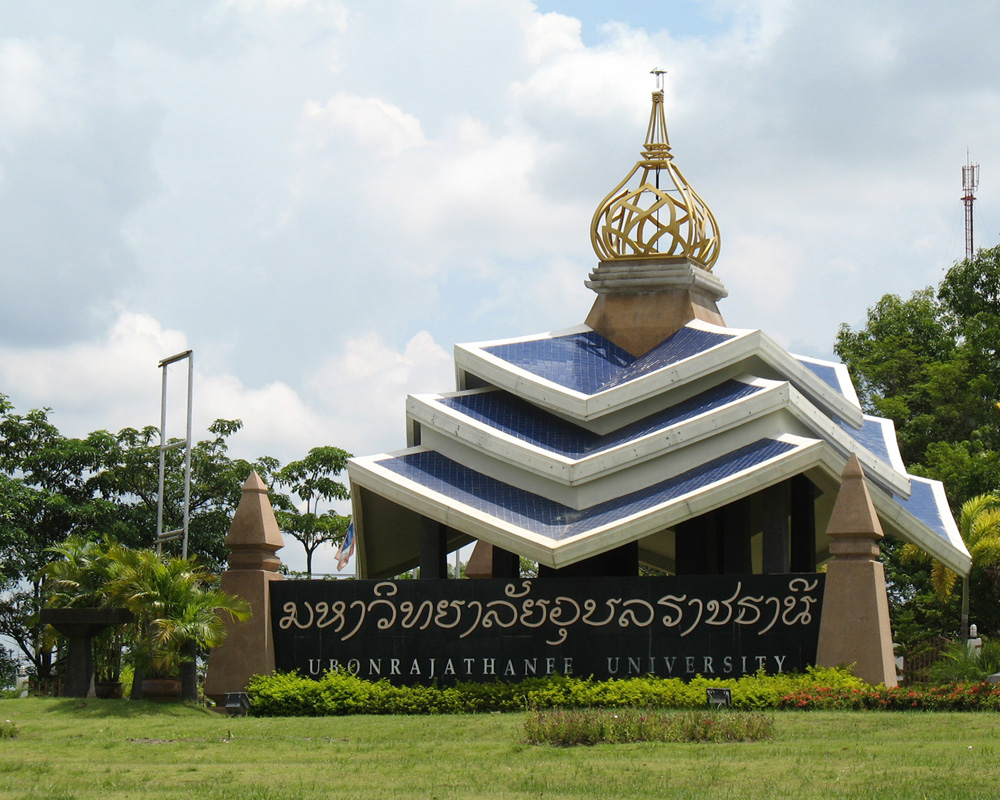
Ubon Ratchathani University Gate, Warin Chamrap District

Ubon Ratchathani province is the home of Ubon Ratchathani University.

== Administrative divisions ==
Map of twenty five districts

=== Provincial government ===
The province is divided into 25 districts (amphoe). The districts are further divided into 219 subdistricts (tambons) and 2,469 villages (mubans).

1.	Mueang Ubon Ratchathani
2.	Si Mueang Mai
3.	Khong Chiam
4.	Khueang Nai
5.	Khemarat
6.	Det Udom
7.	Na Chaluai
8.	Nam Yuen
9.	Buntharik
10.	Trakan Phuet Phon
11.	Kut Khaopun
12.	Muang Sam Sip
13.	Warin Chamrap

14.	Phibun Mangsahan
15.	Tan Sum
16.	Pho Sai
17.	Samrong
18.	Don Mot Daeng
19.	Sirindhorn
20.	Thung Si Udom
21.	Na Yia
22.	Na Tan
23.	Lao Suea Kok
24.	Sawang Wirawong
25.	Nam Khun

=== Municipalities ===
No.	City/Town	Thai	Urban Population	Notes
1.	Ubon Ratchathani	เทศบาลนครอุบลราชธานี	79,023	Former capital of the province
2.	Jaeramair	เทศบาลเมืองแจระแม	11,092	New capital and exurb of Ubon Ratchathani
3.	Kham Yai	เทศบาลตำบลขามใหญ่	34,538	Exurb of Ubon Ratchathani
4.	Warin Chamrap	เทศบาลเมืองวารินชำราบ	28,154	Educational, railway terminal
5.	Saen Suk	เทศบาลตำบลแสนสุข	24,720	Exurb, Warin Chamrap
6.	Det Udom	เทศบาลเมืองเดชอุดม	14,264	Main provincial southern city
7.	Kud Prathay	เทศบาลตำบลกุดประทาย	13,382
8.	Kholaen	เทศบาลตำบลคอแลน	12,703
9.	Thep Wongsa	เทศบาลตำบลเทพวงศา
10.	Phibun Mangsahan	เทศบาลเมืองพิบูลมังสาหาร	10,842	Main provincial eastern city
11.	Pathum	เทศบาลตำบลปทุม	10,505	Exurb, Ubon Ratchathani
12.	Nong Phue	เทศบาลตำบลหนองผือ	9,685
13.	Trakan	เทศบาลตำบลตระการ	9,082	Main provincial northern city
14.	Nam Yuen	เทศบาลตำบลน้ำยืน	9,542
15.	Kham Pom	เทศบาลตำบลขามป้อม	9,209
16.	Nikhom Sang Ton Eng Lum Dom Noi	เทศบาลตำบลนิมคมสร้างตนเองลำโดมน้อย	7,538
17.	Na Chaluay	เทศบาลตำบลนาจะหลวย	7,470
18.	Buangam	เทศบาลตำบลบัวงาม	7,086
19.	Na Yia	เทศบาลตำบลนาเยีย	6,730
20.	Khemmaratthani	เทศบาลตำบลเขมราฐ	6,288
21.	Ubon	เทศบาลตำบลอุบล	6,101	Exurb, Ubon Ratchathani
22.	Khuang Nai	เทศบาลตำบลเขื่องใน	4,751
23.	Buntharik	เทศบาลตำบลบุณฑริก	4,607
24.	Sri Muangmai	เทศบาลตำบลศรีเมืองใหม่	4,284
25.	Kud Khaopun	เทศบาลตำบลกุดข้าวปุ้น	4,124
26.	Chongmek	เทศบาลตำบลช่องเม็ก	3,628
27.	Muang Sam Sip	เทศบาลตำบลม่วงสามสิบ	3,358
28.	Huai Khayung	เทศบาลตำบลห้วยขะยูง	3,346
29.	Ang Sila	เทศบาลตำบลอ่างศิลา	3,304
30.	Tansum	เทศบาลตำบลตาลสุม	3,267
31.	Na Suang	เทศบาลตำบลนาส่วง	3,215
32.	Phosai	เทศบาลตำบลโพธิ์ไทร	3,100
33.	ฺBaan Dan - Khong Chium	เทศบาลตำบลบ้านด่านโขงเจียม	2,741
34.	Hua Na	เทศบาลตำบลหัวนา	N/A
35.	Muag Srikai	เทศบาลตำบลเมืองศรีไค	N/A	Exurb, Warin Chamrap
36.	That	เทศบาลตำบลธาตุ	N/A	Educational city, exurb, Warin Chamrap

=== Local government ===
As of 26 November 2019 there are: one Ubon Ratchathani Provincial Administration Organisation (ongkan borihan suan changwat) and 60 municipal (thesaban) areas in the province. Ubon Ratchathani has city (thesaban nakhon) status. Chaeramae, Det Udom, Phibun Mangsahan and Warin Chamrap have town (thesaban mueang) status. Further 54 subdistrict municipalities (thesaban tambon). The non-municipal areas are administered by 179 Subdistrict Administrative Organisations – SAO (ongkan borihan suan tambon).

== Human achievement index 2022 ==
Health	Education	Employment	Income
46	63	32	72
Housing	Family	Transport	Participation
24	4	61	53
Province Ubon Ratchathani, with an HAI 2022 value of 0.6272 is "somewhat low", occupies place 60 in the ranking.

Since 2003, United Nations Development Programme (UNDP) in Thailand has tracked progress on human development at sub-national level using the Human achievement index (HAI), a composite index covering all the eight key areas of human development. National Economic and Social Development Board (NESDB) has taken over this task since 2017.

Rank	Classification
1–13	"High"
14–29	"Somewhat high"
30–45	"Average"
46–61	"Somewhat low"
62–77	"Low"

Map with provinces and HAI 2022 rankings

== Gallery ==
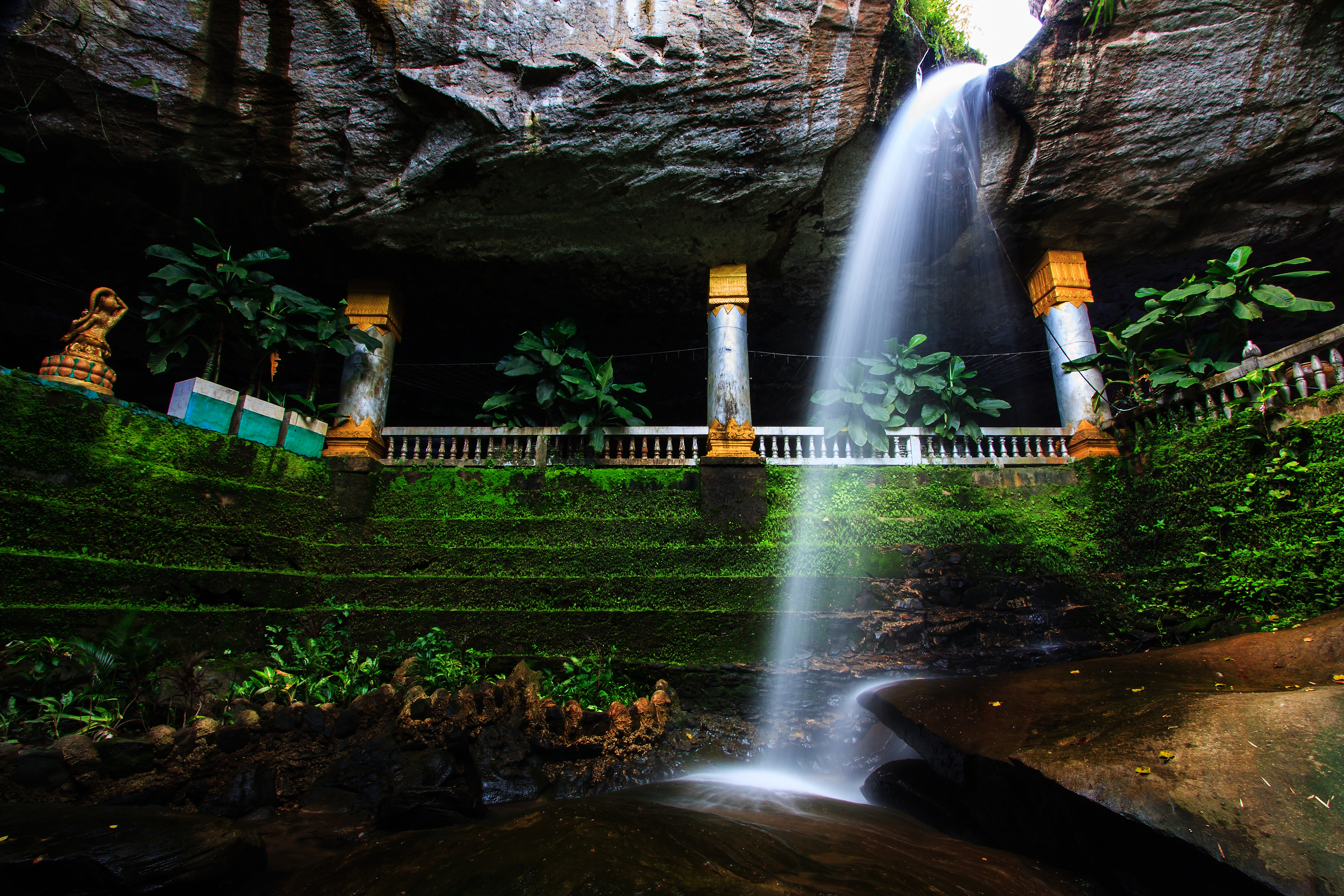
Wat Tham Heo Sin Chai

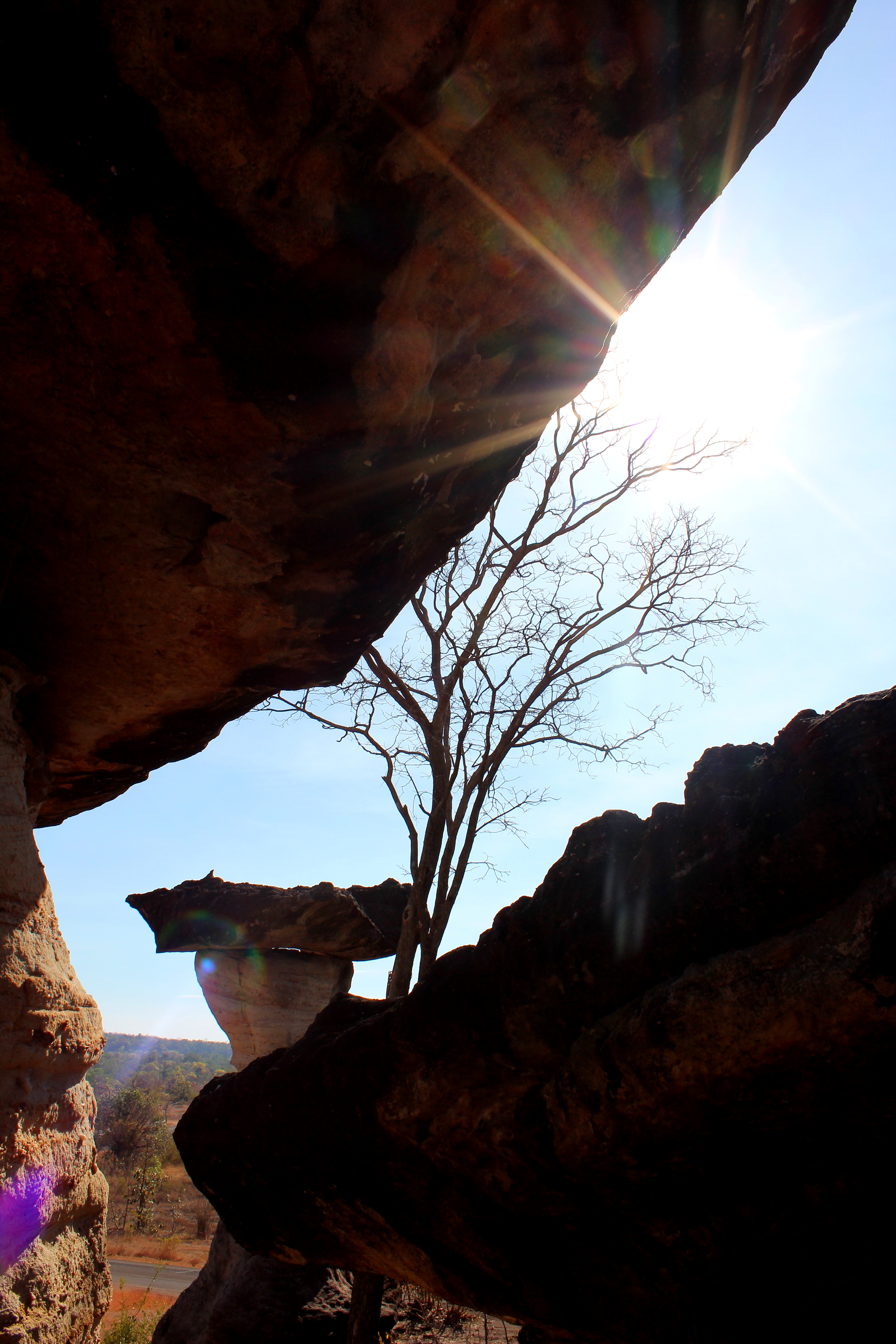
Sao Chaliang or mushroom-like sandstone pillars, dated from the Cretaceous and Jurassic periods, Pha Taem National Park

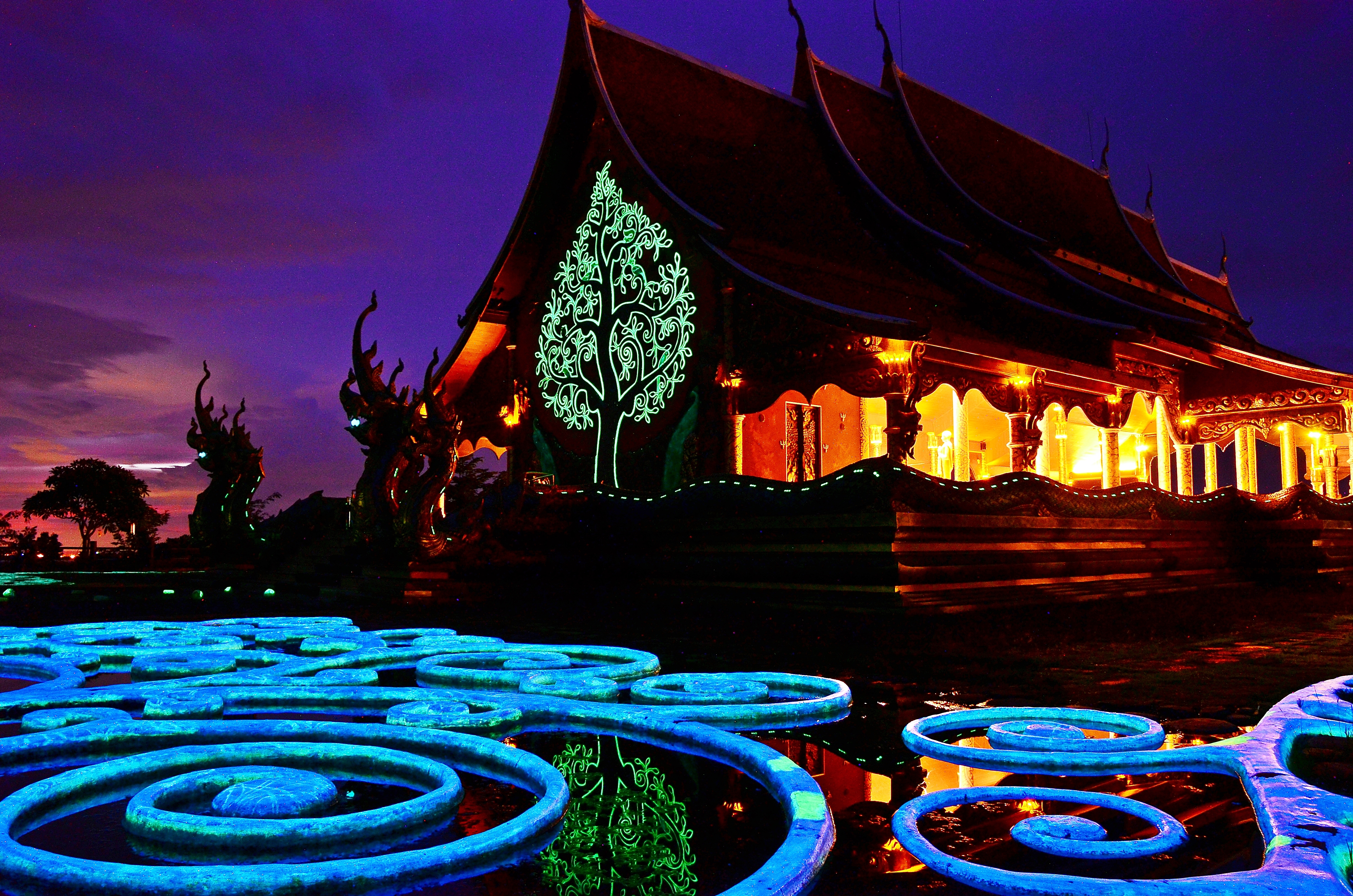
Wat Sirindhorn Wararam Phu Phrao, Sirindhorn District

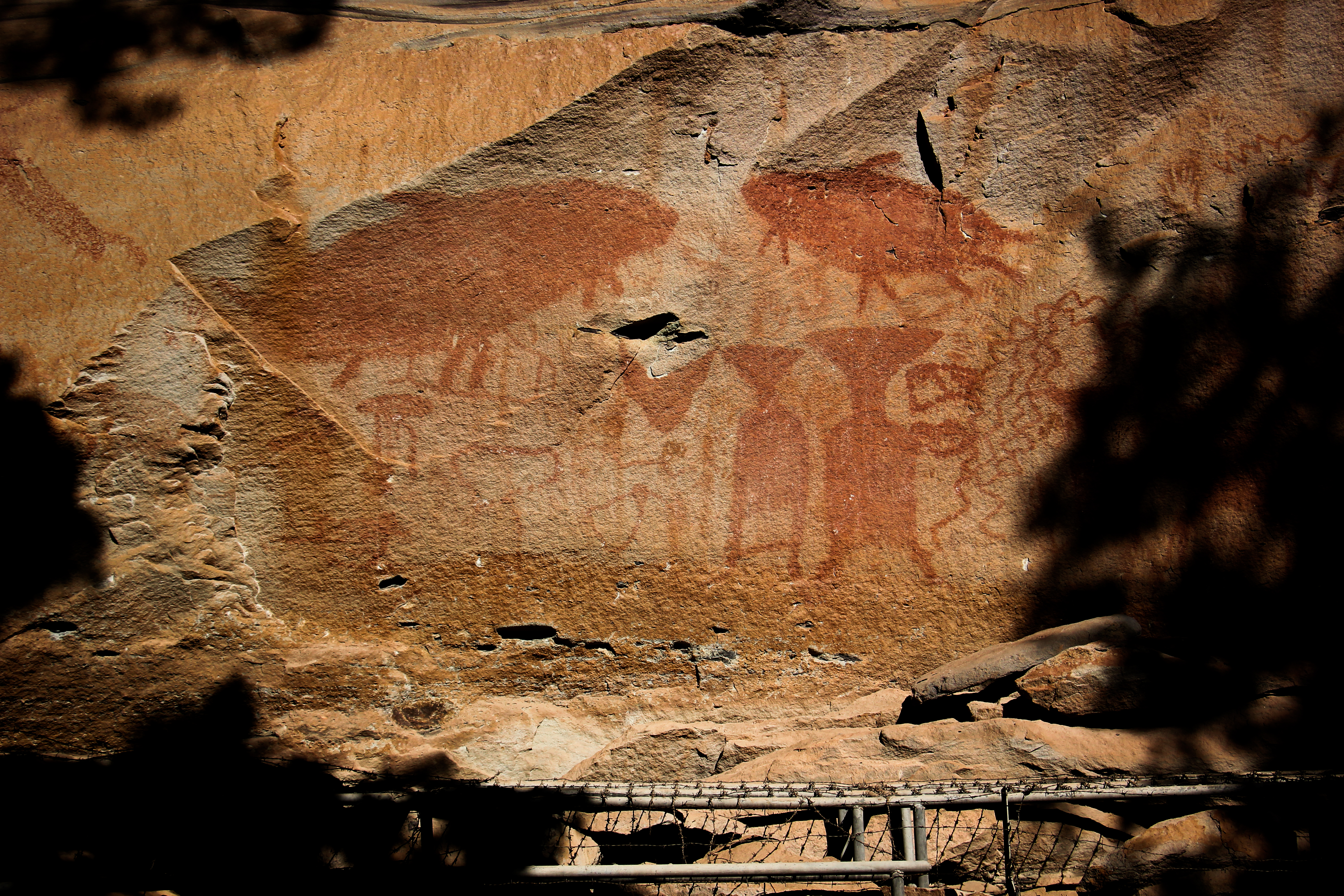
Pha Taem National Park

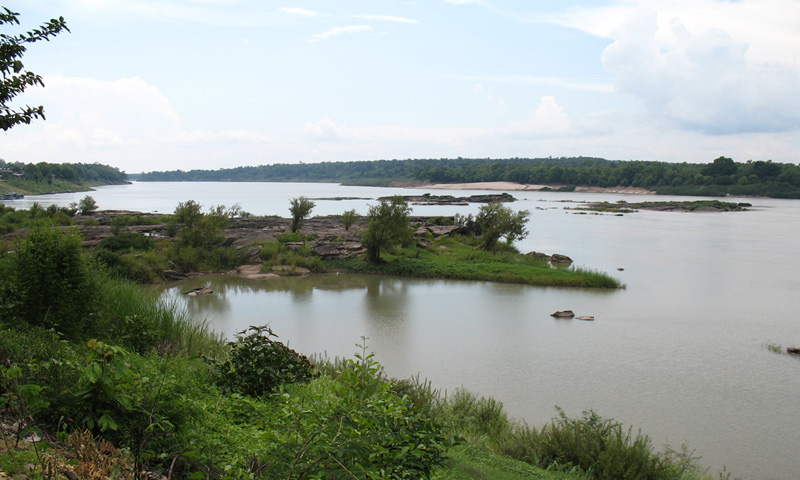
Mekong River in Khong Chiam

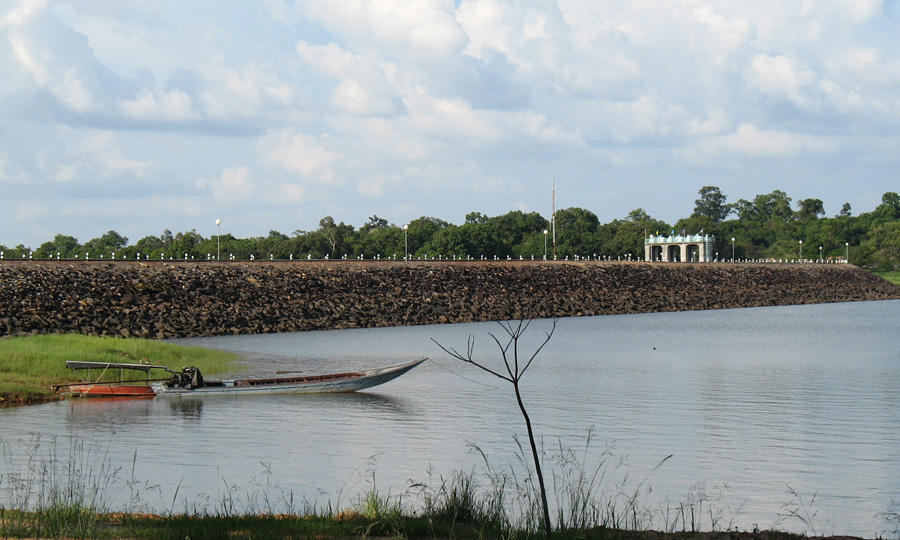
Sirindhorn Reservoir

== Sister cities ==
- Bujumbura, Burundi
- Kigali, Rwanda
- Kinshasa, Democratic Republic of the Congo
- Paris, France

== Notable people ==
- Luang Phu Chah (1918–1992), Buddhist monk
- Banyen Rakgan (born 1952), mo lam and luk thung singer
- Superlek Sorn E-Sarn (1969–2013), Muaythai kickboxer
- Nungubon Sitlerchai (born 1971), Muaythai kickboxer, professional boxer
- Orono Por Muang Ubon (born 1973), Muaythai kickboxer
- Tai Orathai (born 1980), luk thung singer
- Wanchalearm Satsaksit (born 1982), pro-democracy activist who mysteriously disappeared in June 2020
