= Phu Chong–Na Yoi National Park =

National park in Thailand

Phu Chong-Na Yoi National Park
- อุทยานแห่งชาติภูจองนายอย
- IUCN category II (national park)
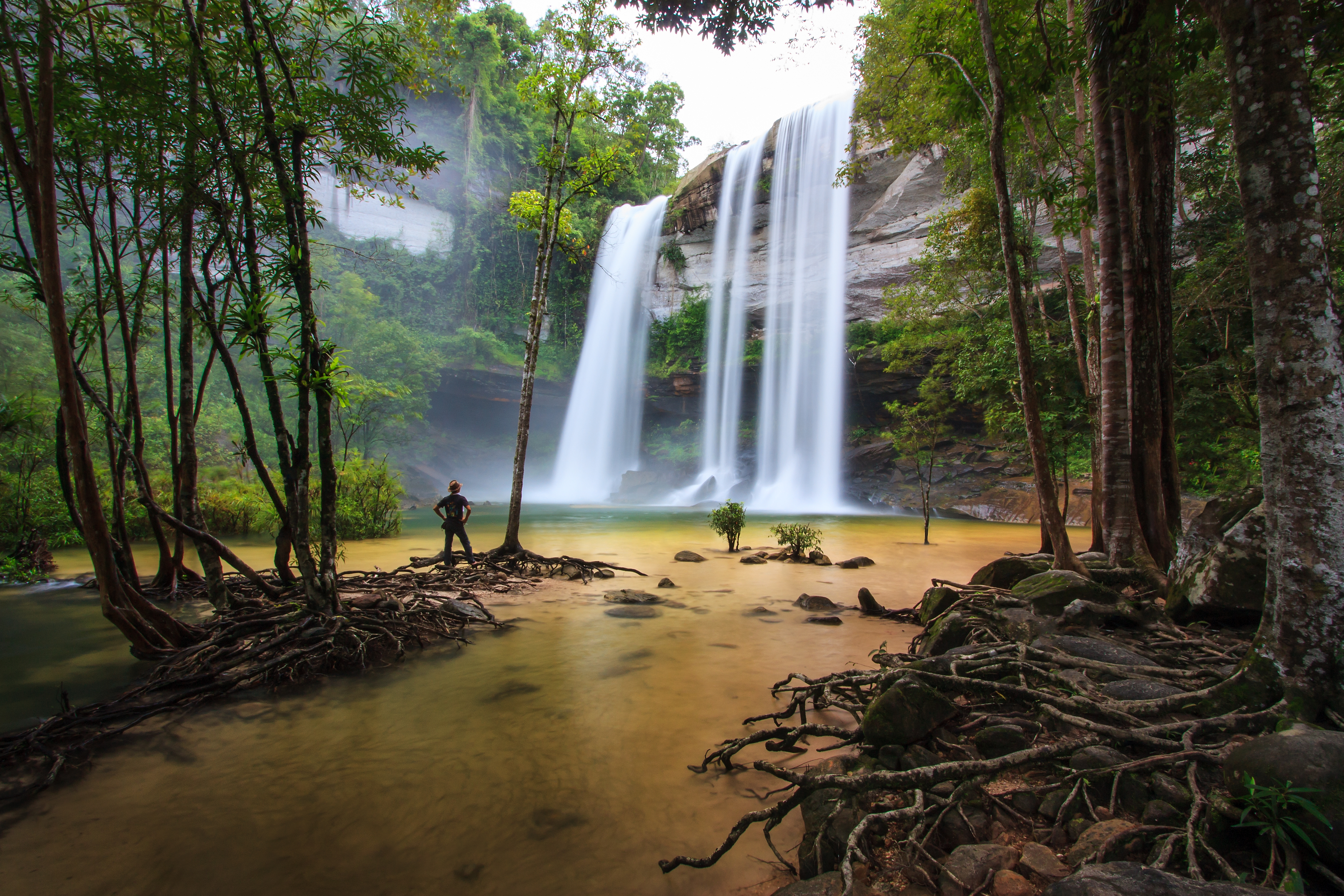
- Huai Luang Waterfall

- Location within Thailand
- Location: Ubon Ratchathani Province, Thailand
- Nearest city: Ubon Ratchathani
- Coordinates: 14°32′0″N 105°23′9″E
- Area: 686 km^{2} (265 sq mi)
- Established: 1987
- Visitors: 127,443 (in 2024)
- Governing body: National Park, Wildlife and Plant Conservation Department

Phu Chong–Na Yoi National Park is a protected area at the eastern end of the Dângrêk Mountains, northeastern Thailand. It is in Buntharik, Na Chaluai, and Nam Yuen districts of Ubon Ratchathani Province. Established in 1987, it is an IUCN Category II protected area, measuring 428,750 rai ~ 686 square kilometres (265 sq mi). In a mountainous area, the park borders Laos and Cambodia. Natural features include the cliffs at Pha Phueng, and the 40 metres (130 ft) Bak Teo Yai Waterfall. In 2004, a specimen of a new frog species, Fejervarya triora, was discovered in the park.

== Sights ==
- Namtok Huai Luang or Namtok Bak Teo (น้ำตกห้วยหลวง หรือ น้ำตกบักเตว) - Plunging down three steps from an elevation of 30 metres, the waterfall has a small pool with a white beach and turquoise coloured water.
- Phlan Yao Rock Garden (สวนหินพลานยาว) - Rocks in different formations are scattered around the area.
- Pha Phueng Viewpoint (จุดชมทิวทัศน์ผาผึ้ง) - The viewpoint is next to the rock garden.
- Namtok Koeng Mae Phong (น้ำตกเกิ้งแม่พอง) - The waterfall is 9 km (5.6 mi) south of Namtok Huai Luang along the nature trail. It originates from the Lam Dom Noi Stream.
- Kaeng Sila Thip (แก่งศิลาทิพย์) - Huai Luang Stream runs over a rock terrace and turns fierce in the rapids. In the middle of the stream, its power has created many holes on the rock surface in different sizes and depths called "kumphalak".
- Phlan Kong Kwian (พลาญกงเกวียน) - The vast rock terrace with rock shelters at the front is home to wild flowers and plants. In previous days, travellers could seek shelter here. It came to be called "phlan kong kwian", which means "cart terrace".
- Phu Hin Dang (ภูหินด่าง) - a cliff-top place to view the forest scenery of Laos and Cambodia. The cliff is brightly coloured. Geologists explain that this is due to dry weather millions of years ago catalyzing mineral residues in the seawater.

== Location ==
Phu Chong-Na Yoi National Park in overview PARO 9 (Ubon Ratchathani)

4) Phu Chong-Na Yoi National Park in overview PARO 9 (Ubon Ratchathani)

	National park
1	Kaeng Tana
2	Khao Phra Wihan
3	Pha Taem
4	Phu Chong-Na Yoi
5	Phu Pha Thoep
6	Phu Sa Dok Bua

	Wildlife sanctuary
7	Buntharik-Yot Mon
8	Huai Sala
9	Huai Thap Than- Huai Samran
10	Phanom Dong Rak
11	Phu Si Than
12	Yot Dom

	Forest park
13	Dong Bang Yi
14	Namtok Pha Luang
15	Pason Nong Khu
16	Phanom Sawai
17	Phu Sing-Phu Pha Phueng

== See also ==
- List of national parks of Thailand
- List of Protected Areas Regional Offices of Thailand
