= Pha Taem National Park =

National park in Thailand

- อุทยานแห่งชาติผาแต้ม
- IUCN category II (national park)
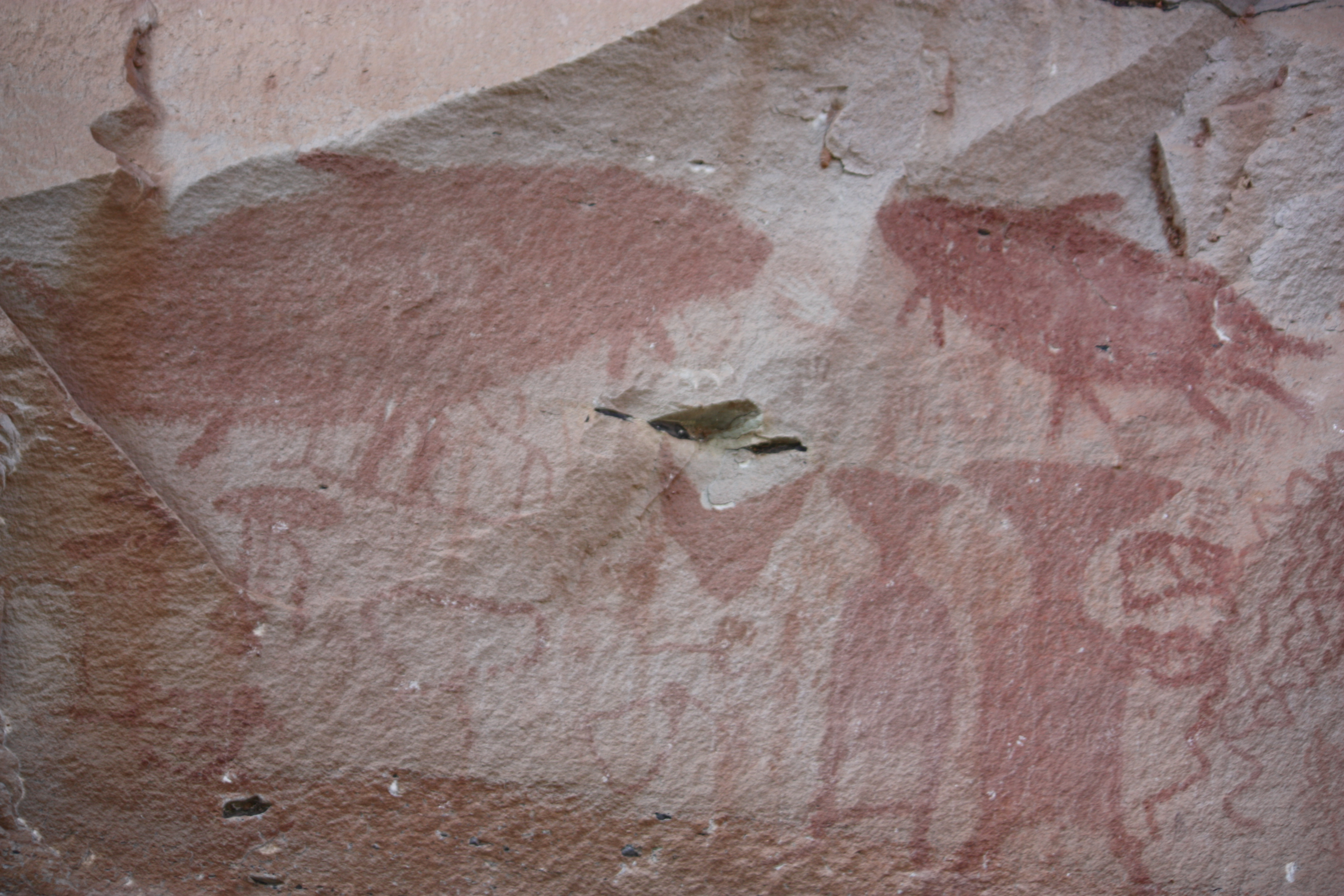
- Rock art includes both humanoid and animal figures like the Giant Mekong Catfish
- Interactive map of Pha Taem National Park
- Location: Ubon Ratchathani Province, Thailand
- Nearest city: Ubon Ratchathani
- Coordinates: 15°24′N 105°31′E
- Area: 340 km^{2} (130 sq mi)
- Established: 31 December 1991
- Visitors: 180,155 (in 2019)
- Governing body: Department of National Park, Wildlife and Plant Conservation (DNP)

Pha Taem National Park (Thai:อุทยานแห่งชาติผาแต้ม) is a national park on the Mekong River in Ubon Ratchathani Province, northeast Thailand. Phou Xieng Thong National Protected Area in Laos is on the opposite side of the river.

It is notable for its Dipterocarp forest cover and for extensive rock art on cliffs above the Mekong. The art is estimated to be 3,000 years old. The park also has several examples of mushroom rocks as well as the largest flower field in Thailand.

Pha Taem National Park is a popular destination for the first sunshine of the New Year to fall on Thailand.

Pha Taem National Park was declared a national park on 31 December 1991, with an area of 212,500 rai ~ 340 square kilometres (130 sq mi).

== History ==
In the past, only a few local peasants from the surrounding region dared to access the Pha Taem area. Because it is believed that Pha Taem is a prohibited location, and the mountain is protected by the holy. Pha Taem is renowned as the "Mountain of Death", and anybody who trespasses risks becoming ill or, worse, dying. The Pha Taem region has been widely publicized. Following that, professors and students from Silpakorn University Department of Archaeology researched and uncovered prehistoric ancient paintings 3,000-4,000 years old at Pha Taem, Ban Kum, Huai Phai sub-district, Khong Chiam district, Ubon Ratchathani province. In the original dialect, "Taem" refers to a drawing, painting, stamping, or any other action that uses color to create images, marks, or symbols. It is the site of prehistoric paintings dating from 3,000 to 4,000 years old, divided into four groups, the longest of which is 180 meters long and contains over 300 images. Furthermore, Pha Taem is surrounded by densely packed trees. As a consequence, they began to draft a memorandum from the department dated May 26, 1981 and requested to the Royal Forest Department that the forest and mountain in the Pha Taem zone be designated as a national park. It was designated as the 74th national park of Thailand. Pha Taem National Park is approximately 340 square kilometers in size. The district of Khong Chiam encompasses the area. Ubon Ratchathani Province's Si Mueang Mai District and Pho Sai District have fertile forest conditions. a variety of wild animals There are numerous natural beauty features in the area, including Pha Chan, Soi Sawan Waterfall, Sao Chaliang, Tham Patihan, Phu Na Tham, and others. There have also been discoveries of ancient paintings. Prehistoric times, approximately 3,000-4,000 years old, in the Pha Kham, Pha Taem, Pha Chek, and Pha Moei areas, and currently a national park. It is designated as a national park with the Mekong River, which forms the border between Thailand and Laos, is the longest national park boundary in Thailand. allowing for a view of the forest on the Laos side.

== Flora and fauna ==
The park is covered by Dipterocarp forest with Shorea obtusa, Shorea siamensis, and Dipterocarpus obtusifollus the dominant species. There are some dry evergreen forests near streams.

The park is habitat for Siamese hares, barking deer, civets, and wild pigs and serow, which migrate from Laos in summer. In 2005, specimens of a new frog species, Fejervarya triora, were discovered in the park. The park's habitat also includes wild elephants that migrate to areas of Ubonrachathani Province from Laos during February and March in search of food, especially banana leaves and fruit. Source: Thai farmers located west of the Mekong River near Bunthalik (sic), Ubon Province.

== Geological and archaeological highlights ==
Pha Taem National Park not only preserves significant prehistoric rock art but is also a notable site for geological and ecological tourism. Visitors often embark on a scenic 4-kilometer hike along the cliffside, which offers panoramic views of the Mekong River and Laos across the border. Along this trail, tourists can observe multiple groups of the ancient pictographs featuring anthropomorphic figures, handprints, and depictions of animals such as the giant Mekong catfish, believed to be sacred creatures in local folklore. The park’s rock formations, including the striking mushroom rocks formed by differential erosion, contribute to its geological importance. Conservation efforts are ongoing to protect these delicate artworks from natural weathering and human impact, as the pigment and sandstone surfaces are vulnerable. The combination of cultural heritage, natural beauty, and biodiversity, including seasonal migration of wild elephants, makes Pha Taem a unique destination combining archaeology, ecology, and scenic attraction.

== Gallery ==
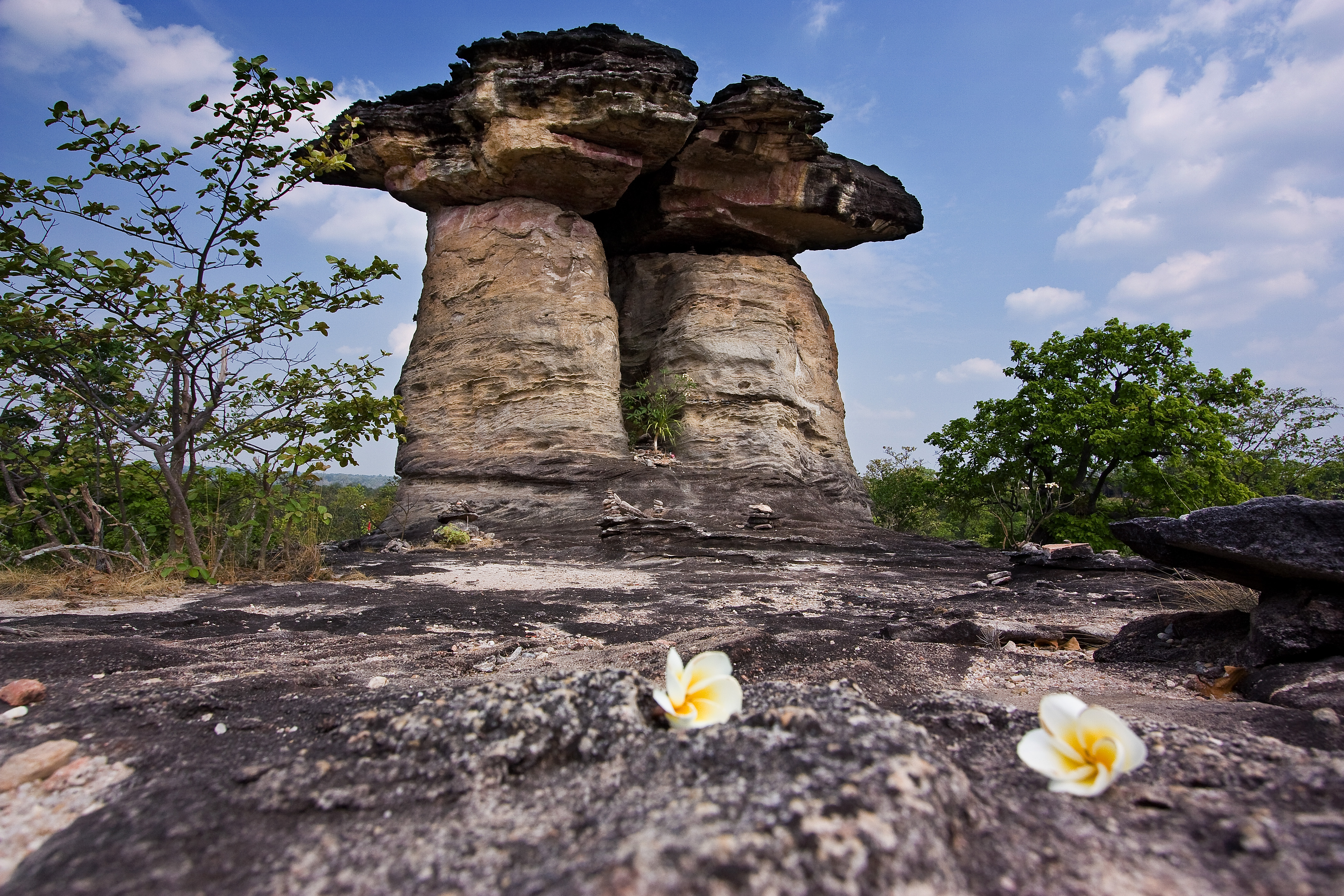
Mushroom-shaped rock pillars

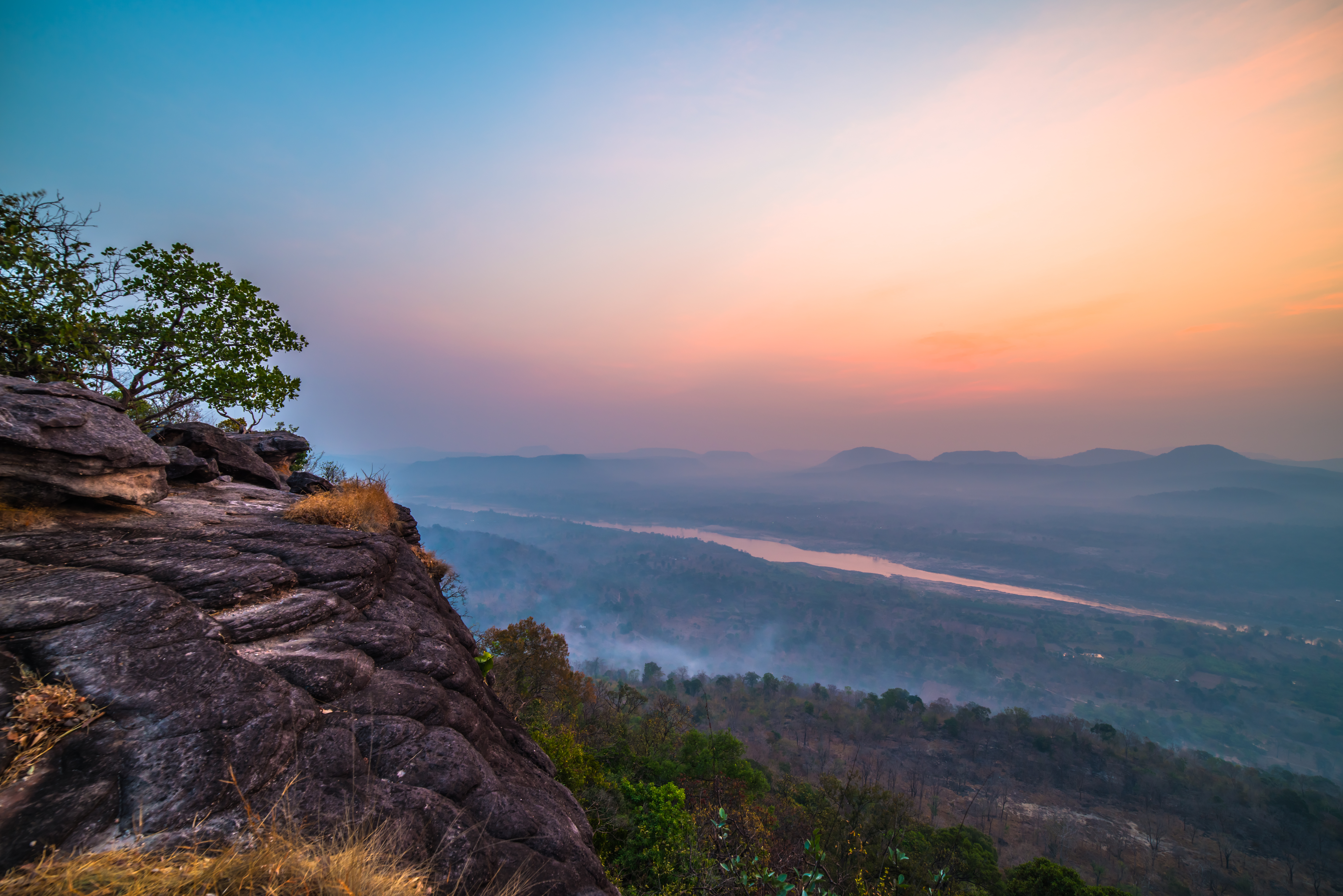
Cha Na Dai Cliff, which receives the first sunshine of the year in Thailand, overlooking the Mekong River and Laos beyond

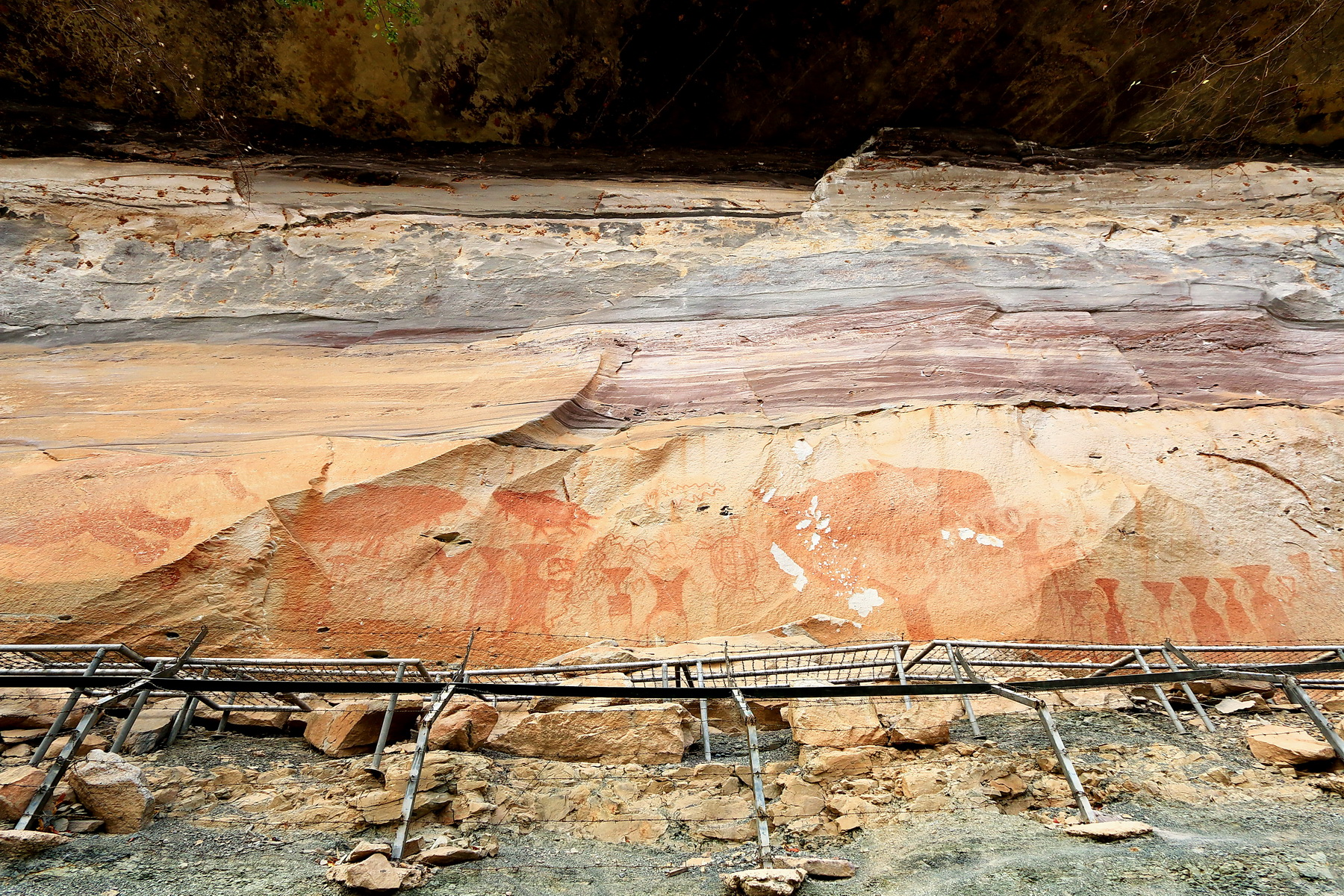
Petroglyphs in Pha Taem National Park

== Location ==
Pha Taem National Park in overview PARO 9 (Ubon Ratchathani)

3) Pha Taem National Park in overview PARO 9 (Ubon Ratchathani)

	National park
1	Kaeng Tana
2	Khao Phra Wihan
3	Pha Taem
4	Phu Chong-Na Yoi
5	Phu Pha Thoep
6	Phu Sa Dok Bua

	Wildlife sanctuary
7	Buntharik-Yot Mon
8	Huai Sala
9	Huai Thap Than- Huai Samran
10	Phanom Dong Rak
11	Phu Si Than
12	Yot Dom

	Forest park
13	Dong Bang Yi
14	Namtok Pha Luang
15	Pason Nong Khu
16	Phanom Sawai
17	Phu Sing-Phu Pha Phueng

== See also ==
- List of national parks of Thailand
- List of Protected Areas Regional Offices of Thailand
