= Kaeng Tana National Park =

National park in Thailand

- อุทยานแห่งชาติแก่งตะนะ
- IUCN category II (national park)
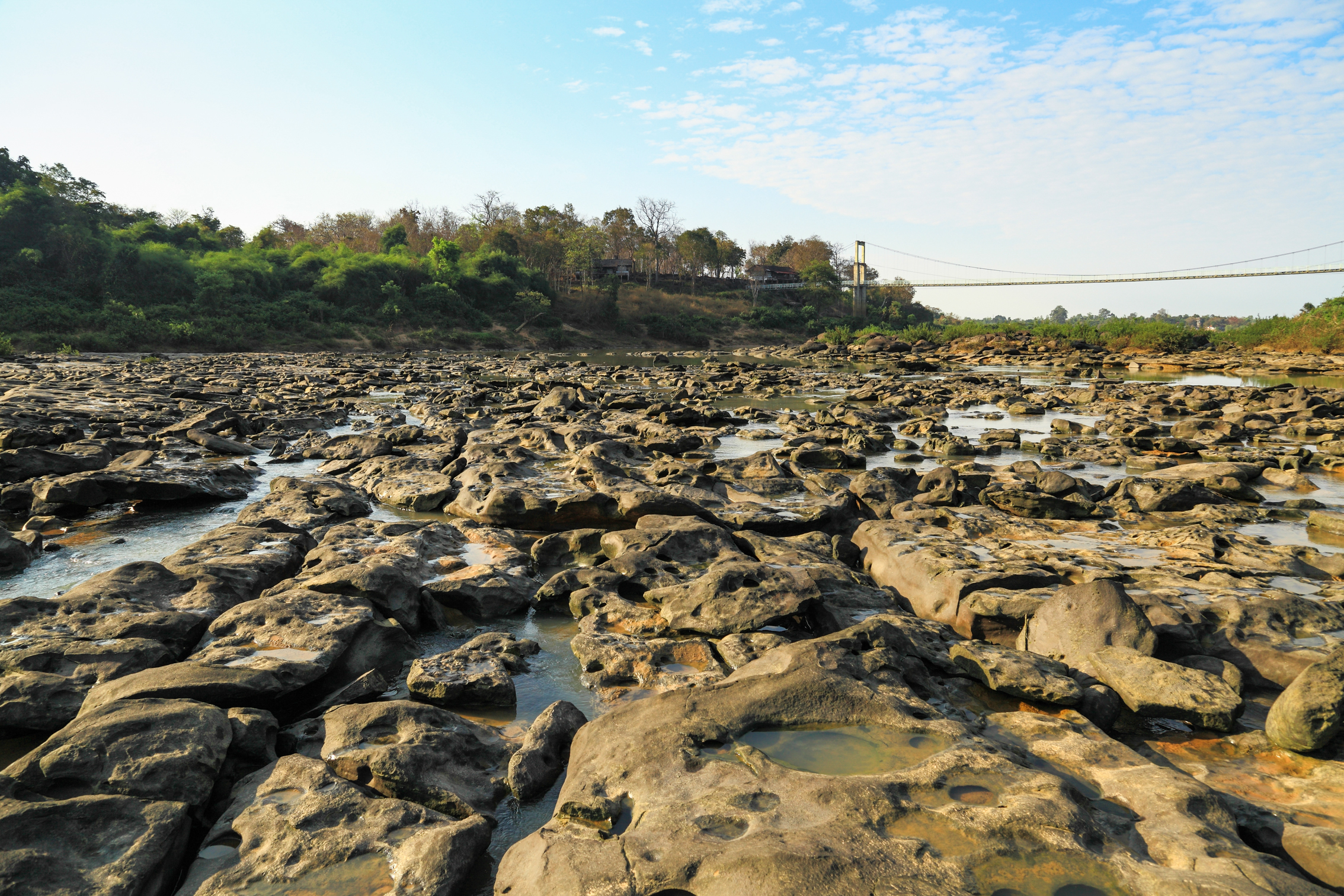

- Location within Thailand
- Location: Ubon Ratchathani Province, Thailand
- Coordinates: 15°17′50″N 105°28′25″E
- Area: 80 km^{2} (31 sq mi)
- Established: 1981
- Visitors: 31,170 (in 2019)
- Governing body: National Park, Wildlife and Plant Conservation Department

Kaeng Tana National Park is in Khong Chiam District in Ubon Ratchathani Province, northeastern Thailand. It is on the Mun River. It was established on 13 July 1981 and is an IUCN Category II protected area.

== Geography ==
The park is 50,000 rai ~ 80 square kilometres (31 sq mi) in size. The park is highland and is watered by the Mun and Khong Rivers. The average elevation is about 200 meters. The park is characterized by plateaux and undulating hills. The highest peak, Ban Tad, stands at 543 meters.

== Flora and fauna ==
The park is covered by deciduous forest, which has dwarf Shorea obtusa, Shorea siamensis, and Dipterocarpus obtusifollus. There are some dry evergreen forests around Huay (stream) and Don (prominence) Tana. Main plants are Eugenia cumini, Pterocarpus macrocarpus, Xylia kerril, teak, grassland, and bamboo. Wildlife includes wild pigs, barking deer, civet, macaque, gibbon, birds, and fishes.

== Sights ==
- Don Tana (ดอนตะนะ) - An island in the middle of the Mun River 450 m (1,480 ft) wide and 700 m (2,300 ft) metres long.
- Kaeng Tana (แก่งตะนะ) - The largest rapids of the Mun River. In the middle of the rapids, there is a huge sandstone boulder splitting the river into two streams, and a concrete block built during the French colonial era to identify a channel for cruising.
- Tham Phra or Tham Phu Ma Nai (ถ้ำพระหรือถ้ำภูหมาไน) - A stone inscription and Lingam base or "Yoni" from the 7th-8th century were found. Now the original stone inscription is kept in the National Museum, Ubon Ratchathani.
- Namtok Rak Sai Nature Trail (เส้นทางศึกษาธรรมชาติน้ำตกรากไทร) - The trail lines the cliff by the Mun River, 500 m (1,640 ft) from the park headquarters. It runs by the cliff for 1 km (0.62 mi) through various kinds of flora, such as lichens, mosses, and ferns.
- Namtok Tat Ton (น้ำตกตาดโตน) - The waterfall is on Highway 2173, off Highway 217 5 km (3.1 mi).

== Location ==
Kaeng Tana National Park in overview PARO 9 (Ubon Ratchathani)

1) Kaeng Tana National Park in overview PARO 9 (Ubon Ratchathani)

	National park
1	Kaeng Tana
2	Khao Phra Wihan
3	Pha Taem
4	Phu Chong-Na Yoi
5	Phu Pha Thoep
6	Phu Sa Dok Bua

	Wildlife sanctuary
7	Buntharik-Yot Mon
8	Huai Sala
9	Huai Thap Than- Huai Samran
10	Phanom Dong Rak
11	Phu Si Than
12	Yot Dom

	Forest park
13	Dong Bang Yi
14	Namtok Pha Luang
15	Pason Nong Khu
16	Phanom Sawai
17	Phu Sing-Phu Pha Phueng

== See also ==
- List of national parks of Thailand
- List of Protected Areas Regional Offices of Thailand
