= Khao Phra Wihan National Park =

Protected natural area in Sisaket Province, Thailand

- อุทยานแห่งชาติเขาพระวิหาร
- IUCN category II (national park)
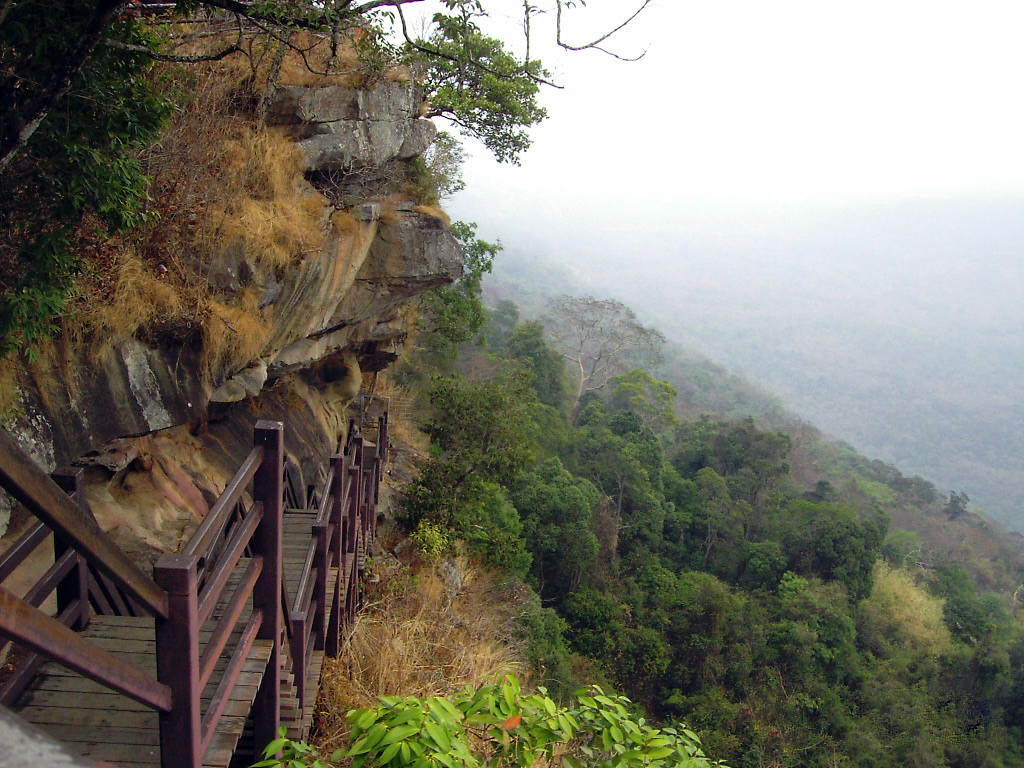
- Mo view from Pha Mo I Daeng Stairway
- Interactive map of Khao Phra Wihan National Park
- Location: Kantharalak, Sisaket, Thailand
- Coordinates: 14°26′42.25″N 104°43′58.52″E
- Area: 130 km^{2} (50 sq mi)
- Established: 20 March 1998
- Visitors: 202,616 (in 2019)
- Governing body: Department of National Park, Wildlife and Plant Conservation (DNP)

Khao Phra Wihan National Park (Thai: อุทยานแห่งชาติเขาพระวิหาร) is a protected area in Kantharalak district, Sisaket province, Thailand, that contains numerous ruins of the 11th century Khmer Empire. The park lies 98 km (61 mi) south of the town of Sisaket, at the end of Thai highway 221. Sited on a red stone cliff that is part of the Dângrêk Mountains on the southern edge of the Khorat Plateau, it abuts the international border between Thailand's Sisaket province and Cambodia's Preah Vihear province. The name of the cliff is Pha Mo I Daeng. The park was established on 20 March 1998, with an area of 81,250 rai ~ 130 square kilometres (50 sq mi).

== Gateway to Prasat Khao Phra Wihan ==
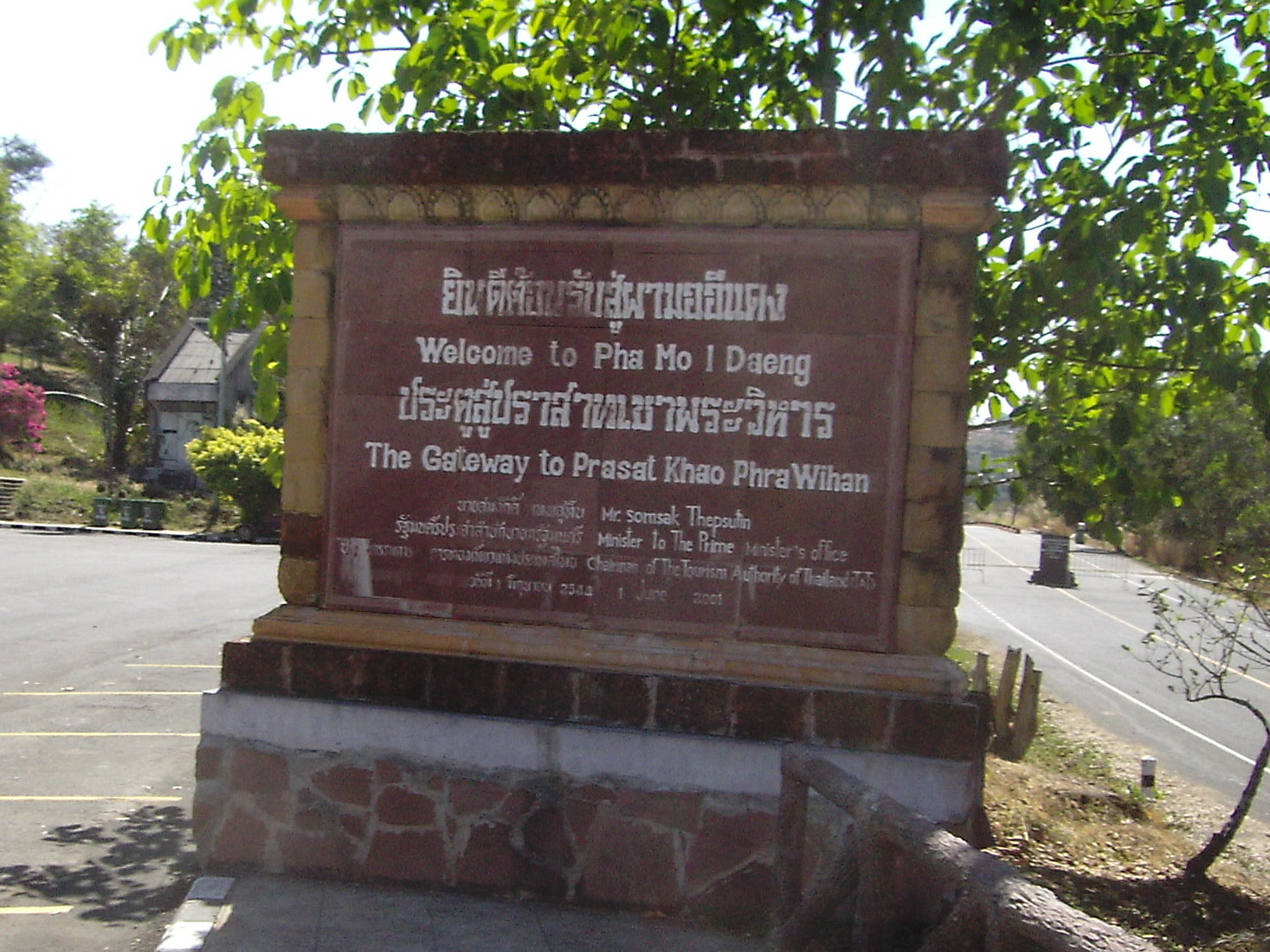

The park atop Pha Mo I Daeng is the Thai gateway to ruins associated with the temple of Preah Vihear, and is generally open to everyone upon payment of entrance fees. When relations between the two countries are normal, the temple ruins are also accessible from the Thai side. Both sides charge additional entrance fees for such access, but Cambodia does not require visas. Access from the Cambodian side is to the temple ruins only. The International Court of Justice awarded the temple ruins to Cambodia in 1962, but these are located in an area of 4.6 km² that Thailand still claims. Nevertheless, in 2008 the World Heritage Committee's 32nd Session listed the Temple of Preah Vihear as a UNESCO World Heritage Site, which prompted an armed dispute.

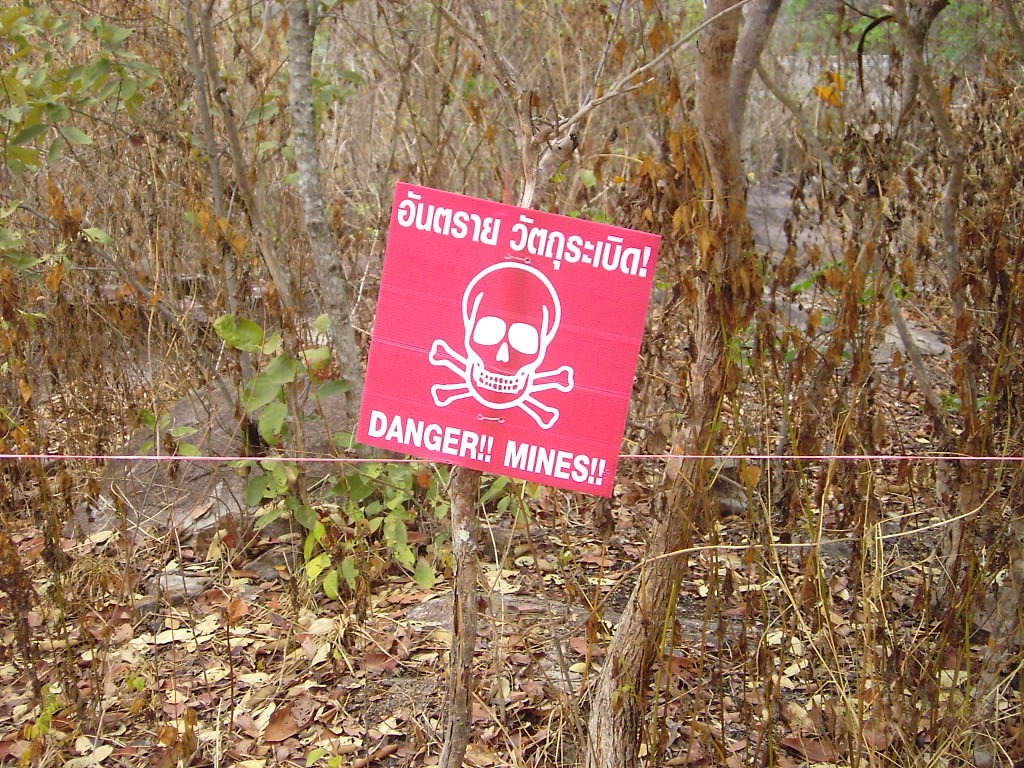

For visitors' safety, areas with landmines are clearly marked.

== Dispute ==
In 2007, Cambodia proposed to the World Heritage Committee's Thirty-First Session that Preah Vihear Sanctuary be listed as a UNESCO World Heritage Site. As Cambodia and Thailand had not resolved border issues concerning the site, the Committee postponed consideration to its 32nd session, and asked Cambodia to provide a complete management plan for the area. Early in January 2008, Cambodia invited Thai experts to participate in a site survey of the Buffer Zone, and then to Siem Reap and Phnom Penh to collaborate with a team of international experts in the making of a plan for the area in Cambodian territory. Thai experts found "unacceptable scientific inaccuracies" in documents presented, dissociated themselves from the group, and then published in rebuttal their own Management Plan for Preah Vihear Mountain and Its Setting. A PDF English language version of the Plan has been released.

Following a February 2011 request from Cambodia for Thai military forces to be ordered out of the area, judges of the International Court by a vote of 11–5 ordered that both countries immediately withdraw their military forces, and further imposed restrictions on their police forces. The court said its ruling would not prejudice any final ruling on where the border in the area between Thailand and Cambodia should fall. It could take the court many months or even years to reach that decision. Abhisit Vejjajiva (caretaker Prime Minister since the just-concluded 2011 Thai general election) said that Thai soldiers will not pull out from the disputed area until the military of both countries agree on the mutual withdrawal. "[I]t depends on the two sides to come together and talk", he said, suggesting that an existing joint border committee would be the appropriate place to plan a coordinated pullback.

== Nomenclature ==
The park's name is of Pali-Sanskrit origin.

Prasat (ปราสาท) is from Sanskrit prāsāda "castle". Thai languages use Prasat to designate ruins resembling forts.
Phra (พระ) is from Sanskrit varaḥ "excellent".
Wihan (วิหาร) is from Sanskrit/Pali Vihara "temple" or its central structure.
Khao (เขา) is Thai for a mount, mountain, or hill ("phnom" in Khmer; Cambodians may say "Phnom Preah Vihear".) เขาวิหาร may be translated into the English language as Temple Hill.

== Pha Mo I Daeng ==
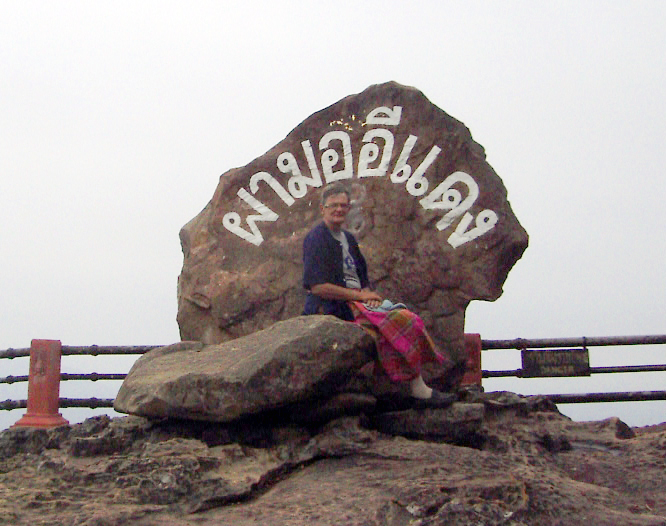

Pha (ผา) is a cliff, crag, rock or tor.
Mo (มอ) pronounced like English "maw" with an even tone means gray or gloomy. (Royal Institute Dictionary 1982 edition "mo" definition 4: [qualifier] blurred, such as mountains obscured darkly (มอ ๔/มอ/[วิเศษณ์] สีมัว ๆ อย่างสีดำเจือขาว.)
I (อี) pronounced like English "ee" is a designation for one without customary restraint.
Daeng (แดง) is red.

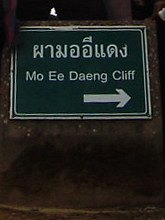

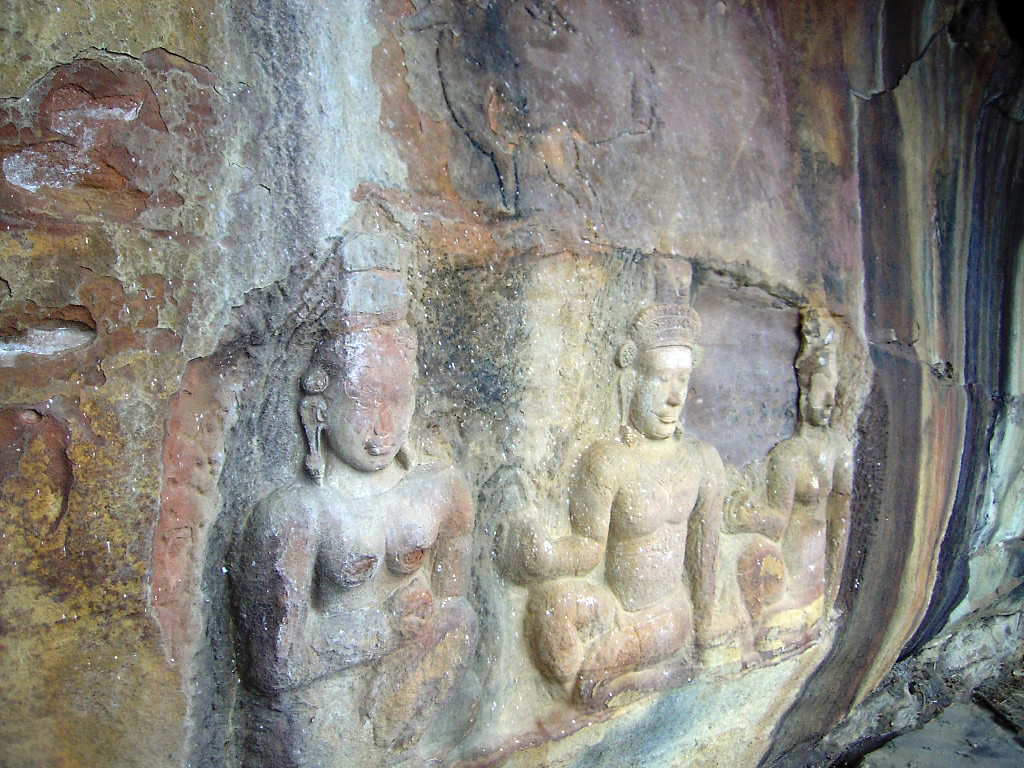

Mo Ee Daeng Cliff rears over 500 metres above the Cambodian plain. In 1987, a Border Protection Ranger Unit discovered two groups of bas-relief images and engravings. The Management Plan says on p. 14, "Based on iconography, the figures are dated circa 10th century, or older than Preah Vihear Temple." The figures are now a highlight of the park. Some parts have flaked off, so the area is barred behind a gate. A staircase leads down to the gate, where the images are clearly visible.

== Other sights ==
The park is covered by dry evergreen forest, mixed dipterocarp forest, and deciduous dipterocarp forest with tree species like Pterocarpus macrocarpus, Shorea siamensis and Xylia xylocarpa var. kerrii. It is home to numerous wildlife which roams between two countries such as wild hog, deer, barking deer, rabbit, squirrel, gibbon and civet.

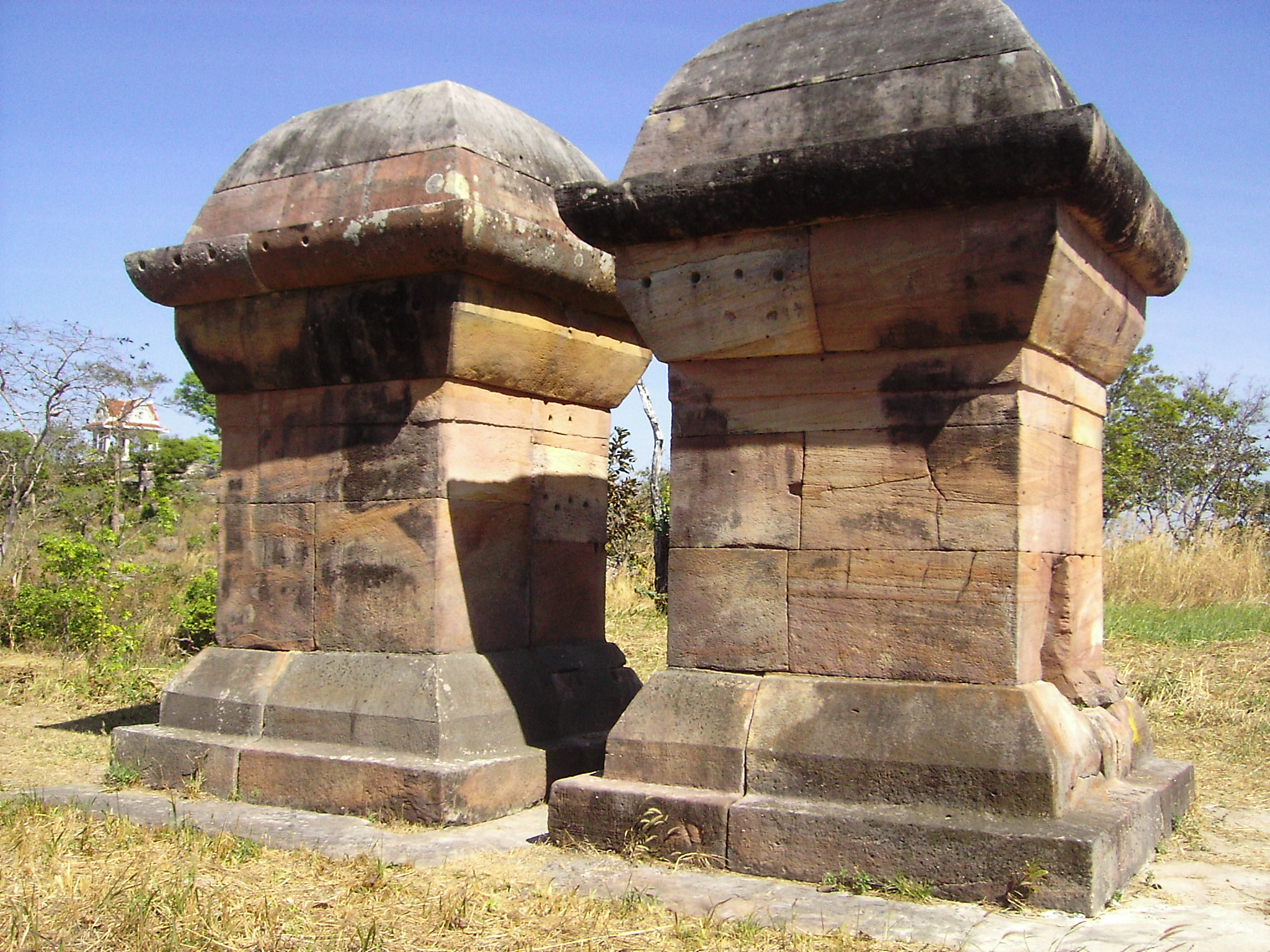
Twin Stupas

'Twin Stupas. The Twin Stupas are two red sandstone structures, 1.93 m. square and 4.20 m. high, with lotus-bud-shaped apices.

Don Tuan Khmer Ruins. Built during the 10th -11th Century, the Khmer Ruins near Ban Phume Sarol (บ้านภูมิซรอล) are located at 14°24′26″N 104°44′45″E, 350 meters onto the Cambodia side of the distinct watershed border ridge, at an elevation of 250 meters above sea level, 30 meters below and 350 meters southwest of the border ridge. The only road access, however, is from Thailand. Legend tells that in the past a lady known as Nang Nom Yai or Nieng Non dor (in Khmer), stopped to rest here on her way to visit a king.

Namtok and Tham Khun Sri. The three-tiered waterfall, above the cave, is situated west of Sra trao close to trail to Phreah Vihear. Khun Sri Cave is of gigantic proportions and was believed to have been the accommodation of Khun Sri, a noble man who controlled rock cutting at Sra Trao at the time of the construction of Preah Vihear Sanctuary.

Namtok Phu La-Ō (น้ำตกภูละออ). Situated in Phanom Dongrak Wildlife Sanctuary, Tambon Sao Thongchai, the small waterfall turns vibrant during September to February.

== Location ==
Khao Phra Wihan National Park in overview PARO 9 (Ubon Ratchathani)

2) Khao Phra Wihan National Park in overview PARO 9 (Ubon Ratchathani)

	National park
1	Kaeng Tana
2	Khao Phra Wihan
3	Pha Taem
4	Phu Chong-Na Yoi
5	Phu Pha Thoep
6	Phu Sa Dok Bua

	Wildlife sanctuary
7	Buntharik-Yot Mon
8	Huai Sala
9	Huai Thap Than- Huai Samran
10	Phanom Dong Rak
11	Phu Si Than
12	Yot Dom

	Forest park
13	Dong Bang Yi
14	Namtok Pha Luang
15	Pason Nong Khu
16	Phanom Sawai
17	Phu Sing-Phu Pha Phueng

== See also ==
- Cambodian–Thai border dispute
- Irridentism
- Preah Vihear
- List of national parks of Thailand
- List of Protected Areas Regional Offices of Thailand
