= Mukdahan =

Mukdahan มุกดาหาร
- Town
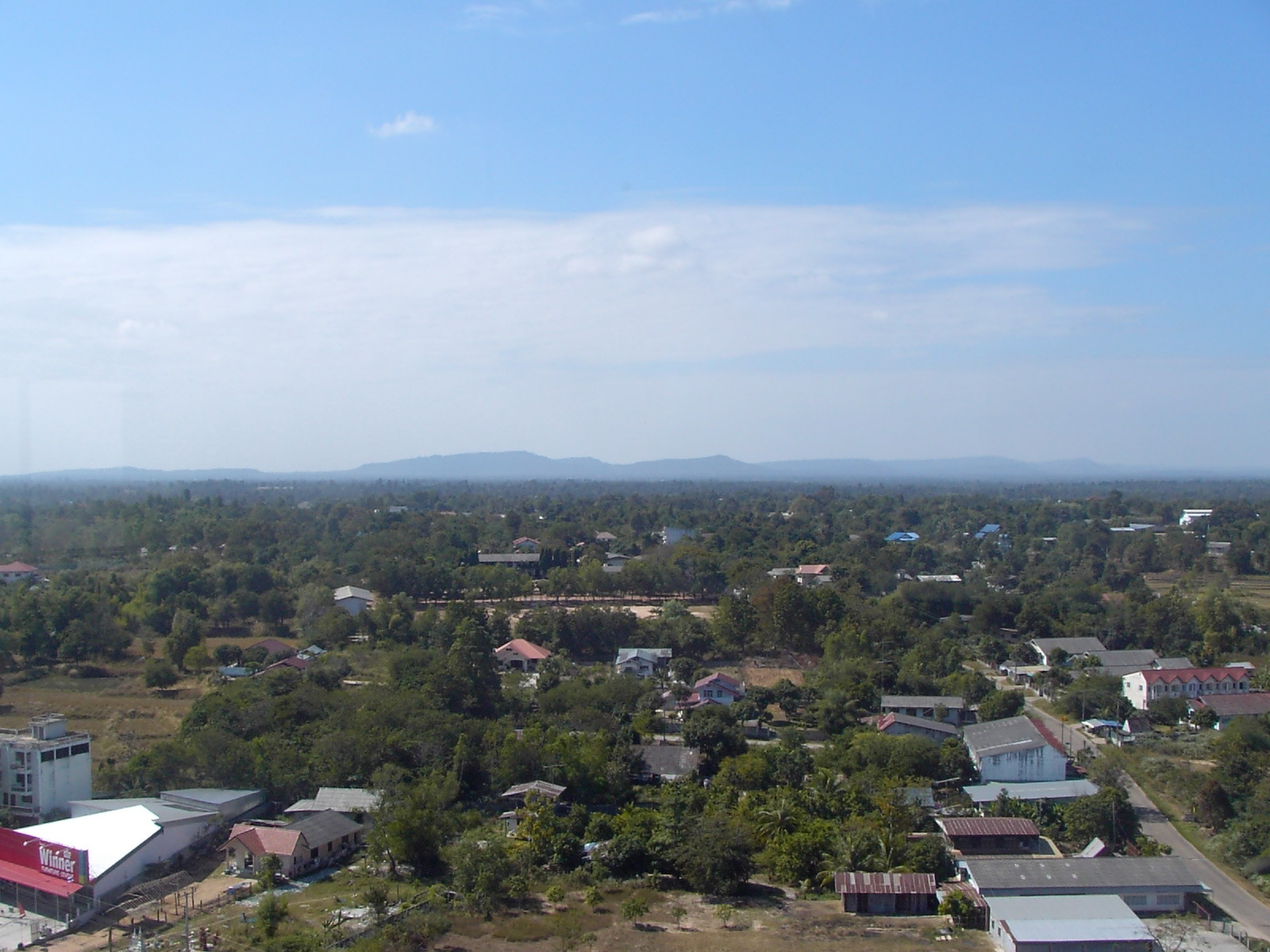
- View from Ho Kaew Mukdahan Observation Deck

- Location in Thailand
- Coordinates: 16°32′35″N 104°43′22″E
- Country: Thailand
- Provinces: Mukdahan Province
- District: Mueang Mukdahan District
- Elevation: 145 m (476 ft)

Population (2000)
  - Total: 180,600
- Time zone: UTC+7 (ICT)
- Climate: Aw

Mukdahan (Thai: มุกดาหาร, pronounced [múk.dāː.hǎːn]) is a town (thesaban mueang) and capital of Mukdahan Province, which became Thailand's 73rd province in 1982. In the northeastern region of the country, on the right (west) bank Mekong River, it was formerly a district of Nakhon Phanom Province. The population of the municipal area was 180,600 in 2010. Mukdahan is 645 km northeast of Bangkok.

== Etymology ==
The city was established at the mouth of Muk Creek (Thai: ห้วยมุก) and named Mukdahan from Kaeo Mukdahan, derived from the following:

- Kaeo แก้ว noun or adjective: glass other than sheet glass; a glass, a tumbler; gem-like, precious, exquisite.
- Muk มุก noun: mother-of pearl; nacre.
- Da ดา verb intransitive: to advance along a wide front
- Han หาร verb intransitive or transitive: to divide; to be divided.

== History ==
Prehistoric paintings and other archaeological discoveries show that the area of Mukdahan was the site of ancient communities. The modern history of the city begins late in the Ayutthaya Era (1350–1767). In the years 1767–1770, Prince Kinnari, son of Prince Suriwong, ruler in Ban Luang Phonsim of Savannakhét, established a settlement at the mouth of Muk Creek, across the Mekong from Savannakhét. In the reign of King Taksin, 1768–1782, Prince Kinnari received appointment as Phraya Chandara Sri Surat with a rank equivalent to viceroy. In 1893, Savannakhét District of Mukdahan was ceded to France.

== Climate ==
Mukdahan has a tropical savanna climate (Köppen climate classification Aw). Winters are dry and warm. Temperatures rise until April, which is hot with the average daily maximum at 36.1 °C (97.0 °F). The monsoon season runs from late-April through early-October, with heavy rains and somewhat cooler temperatures during the day, although nights remain warm.

Climate data for Mukdahan (1991–2020, extremes 1953-present)
Month	Jan	Feb	Mar	Apr	May	Jun	Jul	Aug	Sep	Oct	Nov	Dec	Year
Record high °C (°F)	38.6 (101.5)	40.0 (104.0)	42.1 (107.8)	43.5 (110.3)	42.5 (108.5)	38.3 (100.9)	38.5 (101.3)	36.6 (97.9)	36.7 (98.1)	36.2 (97.2)	37.5 (99.5)	36.7 (98.1)	43.5 (110.3)
Mean daily maximum °C (°F)	30.8 (87.4)	32.9 (91.2)	35.3 (95.5)	36.4 (97.5)	35.1 (95.2)	33.6 (92.5)	32.5 (90.5)	32.1 (89.8)	32.4 (90.3)	32.2 (90.0)	31.5 (88.7)	29.9 (85.8)	32.9 (91.2)
Daily mean °C (°F)	23.0 (73.4)	25.0 (77.0)	28.1 (82.6)	29.6 (85.3)	29.2 (84.6)	28.7 (83.7)	27.9 (82.2)	27.5 (81.5)	27.5 (81.5)	26.7 (80.1)	25.1 (77.2)	22.8 (73.0)	26.8 (80.2)
Mean daily minimum °C (°F)	17.2 (63.0)	19.2 (66.6)	22.8 (73.0)	24.9 (76.8)	25.3 (77.5)	25.4 (77.7)	24.9 (76.8)	24.7 (76.5)	24.4 (75.9)	22.7 (72.9)	20.3 (68.5)	17.7 (63.9)	22.5 (72.4)
Record low °C (°F)	3.2 (37.8)	9.2 (48.6)	11.1 (52.0)	17.0 (62.6)	18.0 (64.4)	21.3 (70.3)	21.3 (70.3)	21.7 (71.1)	19.6 (67.3)	15.1 (59.2)	9.4 (48.9)	5.3 (41.5)	3.2 (37.8)
Average precipitation mm (inches)	3.0 (0.12)	18.3 (0.72)	42.6 (1.68)	67.7 (2.67)	202.6 (7.98)	204.8 (8.06)	292.7 (11.52)	337.9 (13.30)	232.1 (9.14)	75.0 (2.95)	9.9 (0.39)	4.3 (0.17)	1,490.9 (58.70)
Average precipitation days (≥ 1.0 mm)	0.7	1.6	3.4	5.3	12.5	12.5	16.6	18.0	13.6	5.8	1.4	0.5	91.9
Average relative humidity (%)	66.8	63.8	62.0	64.5	73.5	78.2	81.4	83.7	82.4	75.3	70.7	68.3	72.6
Average dew point °C (°F)	15.9 (60.6)	17.0 (62.6)	19.4 (66.9)	21.6 (70.9)	23.5 (74.3)	24.2 (75.6)	24.2 (75.6)	24.3 (75.7)	24.0 (75.2)	21.6 (70.9)	19.0 (66.2)	16.2 (61.2)	20.9 (69.6)
Mean monthly sunshine hours	275.9	243.0	275.9	243.0	158.1	117.0	120.9	117.8	144.0	198.4	252.0	257.3	2,403.3
Mean daily sunshine hours	8.9	8.6	8.9	8.1	5.1	3.9	3.9	3.8	4.8	6.4	8.4	8.3	6.6
Source 1: World Meteorological Organization, Meteomanz (record)
Source 2: Office of Water Management and Hydrology, Royal Irrigation Department (sun 1981–2010)(extremes)

== Second Thai-Lao Friendship Bridge ==
The Second Thai–Lao Friendship Bridge, spanning the Mekong River to connect Mukdahan with Savannakhet in Laos was completed in December 2006.

== Ho Kaeo Mukdahan ==
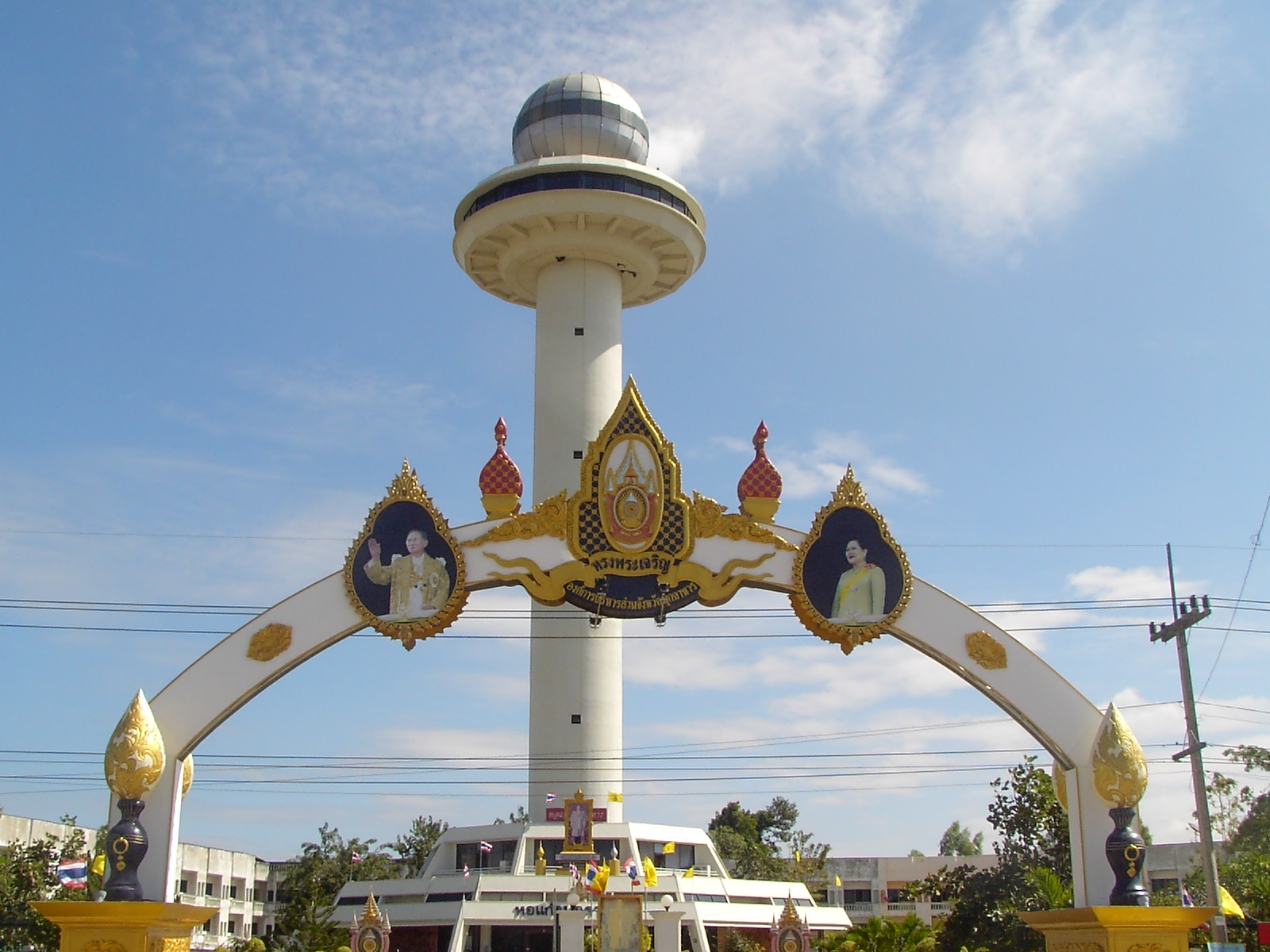
Ho Kaeo Mukdahan

Ho Kaeo Mukdahan (Thai: หอแก้วมุกดาหาร), or Mukdahan Tower, is an observation tower 65.5 metres in height, constructed in 1996 to honor the 50th anniversary of the king's accession to the throne.

- 1st Floor—Art and Culture Museum
- 2nd Floor—History and Culture of eight ethnic tribes of Mukdahan

- Tai Kha (Thai: ไทยข่า)
- Tai Kha Soe (Thai: ไทยกะโซ่)
- Tai Kha Lerng (Thai: ไทยกะเลิง)
- Isan Peoples (Thai: ชาวไทยอิสาน)
- Tai Yor (Thai: ไทยย้อ)
- Tai Saek (Thai: ไทยแสก)
- Tai Kula (Thai: ไทยกุลา)
- Phu Tai (Thai: ชาวผู้ไทย)

- 3rd-5th Floors—Pillar of the tower
- 6th Floor—360° Observation deck
- 7th Floor—A silver Buddha image in the meditation position called Phra Buddhanavamingmongkol (Thai: พระพุทธนวมิ่งมงคลดาหาร), and the Buddha image for each day of the week
