= Phana =

Phana may refer to:

- Phana district, Amnat Charoen province, Thailand
- Phana Khlaeoplotthuk (born 1967), commander-in-chief of the Royal Thai Army since 2024
- Phanaʼ language, spoken in Laos and China

== See also ==
- Sabinus of Hermopolis, also known as Phanas, 3rd century Christian martyr
- Phanas of Pellene (fl. 512 BC), ancient Greek athlete
- Fana (disambiguation)
