= Fain =

Fain may refer to:

== People ==
- Fain (surname)
- Fain Skinner (born 1985), American racing driver

== Places ==
- Fain Lake, a lake in Arizona, United States
- Fain-lès-Montbard, a commune in Côte-d'Or, France
- Fain-lès-Moutiers, a commune in Burgundy, France

== Other uses ==
- Fain, a character in the Wheel of Time series, see List of Wheel of Time characters
- Fain, a 2013 album by British psychedelic rock band Wolf People
- Fain (horse), an Argentine racehorse

== See also ==
- Fane (disambiguation)
