= Fain (surname) =

Fain is a French surname, and it derived from the Latin Fanum meaning 'temple'. Notable people with the surname include:

- Agathon Jean François Fain (1778–1837), French historian
- Ben Fain (1903–1976), American bridge player
- Benjamin Fain (1930–2013), Israeli physicist
- Ferris Fain (1921–2001), American baseball player
- Harry Fain (1918–2007), American lawyer
- Holley Fain (born 1981), American actress
- Joe Fain (born 1980), American politician
- Katja Fain (born 2001), Slovenian swimmer
- Lisa Fain, American food writer
- Mark Fain, American musician
- Melanie Fain (born 1958), American printmaker
- Rhea Fain, NASCAR team owner
- Richard Fain (born 1968), American football player
- Sammy Fain (1902–1989), American composer
- Sarah Fain, American writer and producer
- Sarah Lee Fain (1888–1962), American schoolteacher and politician
- Shawn Fain (born 1968 or 1969), American labor leader
- Tim Fain, American violinist
