= Khemarat district =

Khemarat เขมราฐ
- District
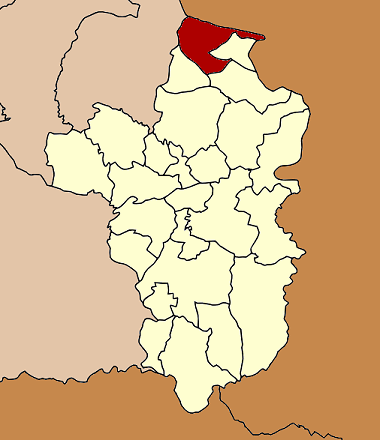
- Districtlocation in Ubon Ratchathani province
- Coordinates: 16°2′24″N 105°12′24″E
- Country: Thailand
- Province: Ubon Ratchathani

Area
  - Total: 525.1 km^{2} (202.7 sq mi)

Population (2005)
  - Total: 77,010
  - Density: 146.7/km^{2} (380/sq mi)
- Time zone: UTC+7 (ICT)
- Postal code: 34170
- Geocode: 3405

Khemarat (Thai: เขมราฐ) is the northernmost district (amphoe) of Ubon Ratchathani province, northeastern Thailand.

== History ==
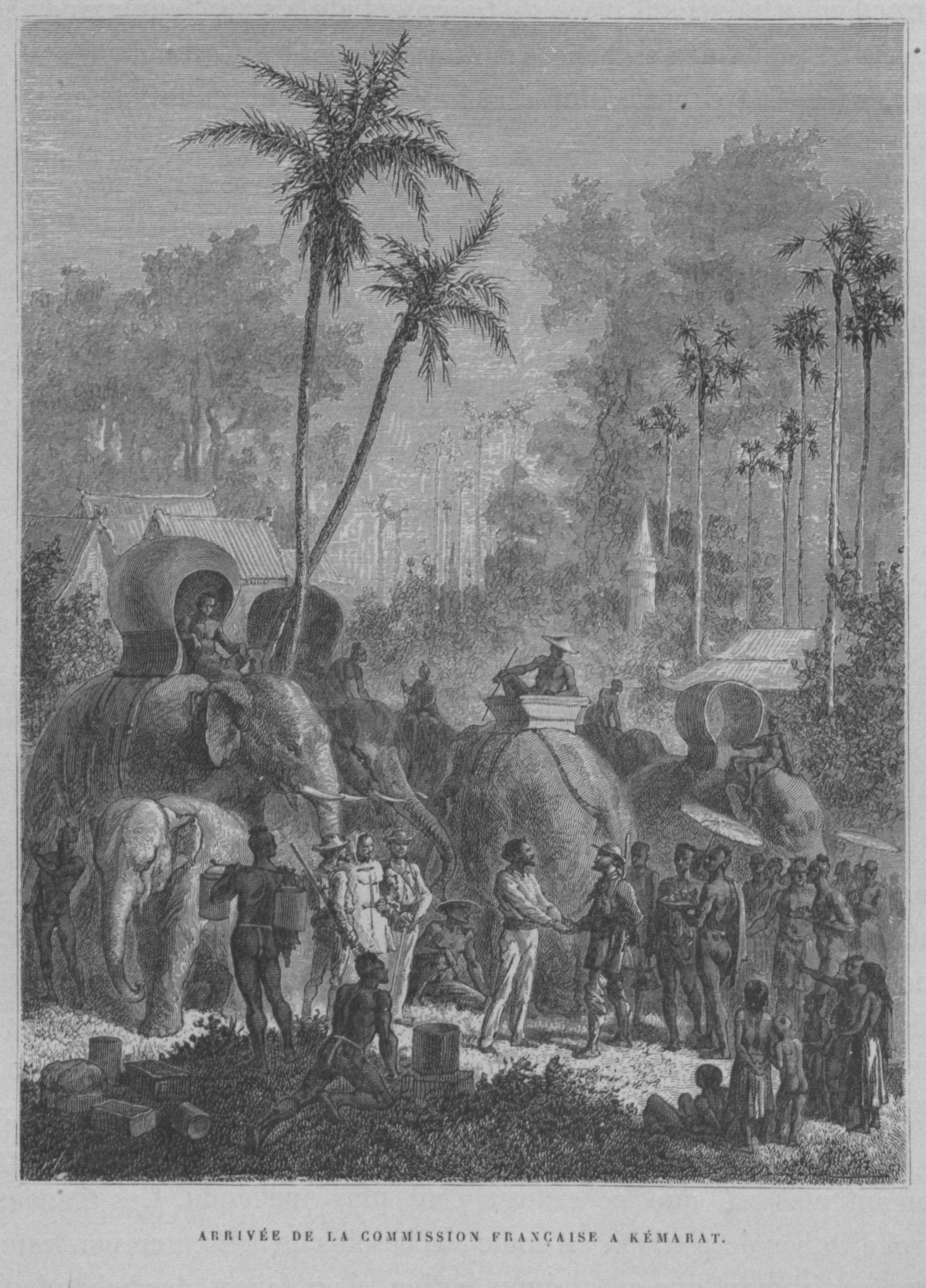
The French Mekong Expedition of 1866–68 in Mueang Khemarat

Mueang Khemarat is an ancient city. It was a first class city in the Rattanakosin Kingdom and reported directly to Bangkok. During the Thesaphiban reforms at the beginning of the 20th century it became subordinate to Ubon Ratchathani. A high school there is named Khemmarat Pittyakom School which is well run.

== Geography ==
Neighboring districts are (from the southeast clockwise) Na Tan, Pho Sai, and Kut Khaopun of Ubon Ratchathani Province, Pathum Ratchawongsa and Chanuman of Amnat Charoen province. To the northeast across the Mekong River is the Laotian province of Salavan. It is on the border of Thailand-Laos. You can even hear the music in Laos. It is about a 3-hour bus ride to the city of Ubon.

The important water resource is the Mekong River. Every Saturday there is a walking street on one of their main roads, with lots of food, dancing, music, and street vendors.

== Administration ==
The district is divided into nine sub-districts (tambons), which are further subdivided into 117 villages (mubans). Khemarat itself is a township (thesaban tambon) which covers parts of the tambon Khemarat. There are a further nine tambon administrative organizations (TAO).

No.	Name	Thai name	Villages	Pop.
1.	Khemarat	เขมราฐ	19	16,987
3.	Kham Pom	ขามป้อม	17	9,288
4.	Chiat	เจียด	9	4,858
7.	Nong Phue	หนองผือ	13	9,243
8.	Na Waeng	นาแวง	12	7,052
10.	Kaeng Nuea	แก้งเหนือ	10	6,253
11.	Nong Nok Tha	หนองนกทา	13	5,764
12.	Nong Sim	หนองสิม	10	4,908
13.	Hua Na	หัวนา	14	12,657

Missing numbers belong to tambon which now form Na Tan District.

== Pop culture ==
Khemarat is mentioned to in the 2016 Thai romance drama film Embracing Khemarat as a backdrop of the entire plot.
