= Tanyalak Technological College =

- Type: Private Technological College
- Established: 4 November 2014
- Founders: Dr.Chutima Rayanakorn
- Director: Dr.Tanyalak Srisawat
- Licensee: Dr.Chutima Rayanakorn
- Location: 442/2 Village No. 5 Muangsamsip-Khueng Nai Road, Muang Sam Sip, Muang Sam Sip, Ubon Ratchathani, Thailand; 15.506208°N 104.721081°E
- Colors: Pink Purple
- Website: Facebook Official

Tanyalak Technological College (Thai: วิทยาลัยเทคโนโลยีธัญลักษณ์) is a private vocational college in Ubon Ratchathani, Thailand. The college, founded by Dr.Chutima Rayanakorn on 4 November 2014, is the first and only vocational college in Muang Sam Sip District, Ubon Ratchathani. The college provides education for students from Vocational Certificate 1 through High Vocational Certificate 2. The college is under the Office of the Vocational Education Commission, Ministry of Education (Former under the Office of the Private Education Commission)

== History ==
Tanyalak Technological College founded by the spirit of Dr. Chutima Rayanakorn that recognized the need and importance of education of youth in Muang Sam Sip District. Ubon Ratchathani very much. In order to travel to study in the Ubon Ratchathani city as the burden to the parents. Causing an impetus to the establishment of the college. To ease the burden of parents in Muang Sam Sip District, Ubon Ratchathani. It also raised the level of vocational education in Muang Sam Sip District, Ubon Ratchathani for progress and development of the youth and social prosperity than ever.

In the Academic Year 2015, The college was founded by Dr. Chutima Rayanakorn as Licensee. She has rented an area of 3,200 square meters with buildings such as Boon Ruen Building (อาคารบุญเรือน) and Dome Building (อาคารโดม) for a period of 10 years (in the process of registration) for use as a college building, library, director room, computer room, multipurpose hall, multipurpose room, and other rooms. The College is open for the first time on May 16, 2015. There are 21 students, 3 administrators, and 3 teachers.

In the Academic Year 2016, The college was authorized for opening the Vocational Certificate courses for Food and Nutritional in Department of Culinary and Hotel Management in Department of Tourism Industry and High Vocational Certificate courses for Accounting and Business Computer in Department of Business Administration. There are 23 students, 3 administrators, 4 teachers, and 1 Educational Personnel.

== Buildings ==
Name	Details
Boon Ruen Building (อาคารบุญเรือน)	Vocational Certificate classrooms; High Vocational Certificate classrooms; Library; Director Room; Nursing Room; Computer Laboratory; Hotel Management Laboratory; Food and Nutritional Laboratory
Dome Building (อาคารโดม)	Multi-purpose hall

== Courses ==
Courses offered at Tanyalak Technological College
Department	Vocational Certificate (VC)	High Vocational Certificate (HVC)
Commercial Department (VC); Business Administration Department (HVC)	Commercial Department: Accounting; Business Computer	Business Administration Department: Accounting; Business Computer
Department of Tourism Industry	Department of Tourism Industry: Hotel Management	Department of Tourism Industry: No subjects opened in this department
Department of Culinary	Department of Culinary: Food and Nutritional	Department of Culinary: No subjects opened in this department

== College symbols ==
=== Vision ===
Tanyalak Technological College is a college that focuses on vocational education for students to develop knowledge and educational technology to modern technology and are able to live in a society and a happy nation.

=== Colours ===
Pink means Scholarly

Purple means Leadership and generous

== List of directors ==
Acting Director

No.	Name	Term in office
-	Dr.Chutima Rayanakorn (Licensee)	4 November 2014 - 2 March 2015 (118 days)
1	Dr.Tanyalak Srisawat	2 March 2015 - Incumbent (11 years, 106 days)
