= Trakan Phuet Phon district =

Trakan Phuet Phon ตระการพืชผล
- District
- District location in Ubon Ratchathani province
- Coordinates: 15°36′44″N 105°1′19″E
- Country: Thailand
- Province: Ubon Ratchathani
- Seat: Khulu

Area
  - Total: 1,306.0 km^{2} (504.2 sq mi)

Population (2008)
  - Total: 120,587
  - Density: 91.7/km^{2} (238/sq mi)
- Time zone: UTC+7 (ICT)
- Postal code: 34130
- Geocode: 3411

Trakan Phuet Phon (Thai: ตระการพืชผล, pronounced [trā.kāːn pʰɯ̂ːt pʰǒn]; Northeastern Thai: ตระการพืชผล, pronounced [tā.kàːn pʰɯ̂ːt pʰǒn]) is a district (amphoe) in the northern part of Ubon Ratchathani province, northeastern Thailand.

== Geography ==
Neighboring districts are (from the northeast clockwise): Kut Khaopun, Pho Sai, Si Mueang Mai, Tan Sum, Don Mot Daeng, Lao Suea Kok of Ubon Ratchathani Province, Pathum Ratchawongsa and Phana district of Amnat Charoen province.

== History ==
The district dates back to the Mueang Phana Nikhon (พนานิคม), which was a subordinate of Mueang Ubon Ratchathani. As the district office was in Ban Khulu, the district was renamed Khulu in 1917. In 1939 it was renamed Phana Nikhom, and finally named Trakan Phuet Phon the following year. The name Trakan Phuet Phon refers to 'beautiful crops'.

== Administration ==
The district is divided into 23 sub-districts (tambons), which are further subdivided into 235 villages (mubans). Trakan Phuet Phon is a sub-district municipality (thesaban tambon) which covers tambon Khu Lu and parts of tambon Kham Charoen. There are a further 22 tambon administrative organizations (TAO).

No.	Name	Thai	Villages	Pop.
1.	Khulu	ขุหลุ	8	7,696
2.	Kradian	กระเดียน	9	4,670
3.	Kasem	เกษม	15	7,711
4.	Kutsakon	กุศกร	9	3,581
5.	Kham Pia	ขามเปี้ย	12	7,170
6.	Khon Sai	คอนสาย	10	5,961
7.	Khok Chan	โคกจาน	12	5,262
8.	Na Phin	นาพิน	11	5,496
9.	Na Samai	นาสะไม	13	6,048
10.	Non Kung	โนนกุง	12	5,886
11.	Trakan	ตระการ	9	6,877
12.	Tak Daet	ตากแดด	10	2,977
13.	Lai Thung	ไหล่ทุ่ง	12	8,370
14.	Pao	เป้า	11	5,921
15.	Se Pet	เซเป็ด	10	3,458
16.	Saphue	สะพือ	8	5,034
17.	Nong Tao	หนองเต่า	9	3,601
18.	Tham Khae	ถ้ำแข้	9	4,428
19.	Tha Luang	ท่าหลวง	9	3,372
20.	Huai Fai Phatthana	ห้วยฝ้ายพัฒนา	12	5,408
21.	Kut Ya Luan	กุดยาลวน	7	3,436
22.	Ban Daeng	บ้านแดง	9	2,827
23.	Kham Charoen	คำเจริญ	9	5,397
