= Fana =

Fana or fanaa may refer to:

== People ==
=== Surname ===
- Frozan Fana (born 1969), Afghan physician and politician
- Hailu Fana (born 1967), Ethiopian cyclist
- Jonathan Faña (born 1987), Dominican footballer
- Mohammad Jan Fana (born 1932), Afghan poet, writer and artist
- Mzonke Fana (born 1973), South African boxer

=== Given name ===
- Saint Fana (c. 354–395), Egyptian Christian hermit
- Fana Ashby (born 1981), Trinidadian sprinter
- Fana Hlongwane, South African politician and businessman
- Fana Kochovska (1927–2004), Macedonian communist, fighter and national hero
- Fana Mokoena (born 1971), South African actor

=== Other people ===
- Fanã, Portuguese football manager Fernando Marques de Sousa Pires (born 1960)
- Anwar Farrukhabadi or "Fana" (1928–2011), Indian Sufi poet

== Places ==
- Fana, the Friulian name of the town of Fanna, Friuli Venezia Giulia, Italy
- Fana, Mali, in the commune of Guegneka, Koulikoro Region, Mali
- Fana, Bergen, a borough of the city of Bergen, Norway
- Fana Municipality, a former municipality in the old Hordaland county, Norway
  - Fana Gymnas, a public high school
  - Fana Stadion, a multi-use stadium at Rådal
  - Fana prosti, a deanery in the Church of Norway
  - Fana Church, a parish church
- Fana Island, one of the Southwest Islands of Palau

== Arts and entertainment ==
- Fanaa (2006 film), an Indian romantic crime drama
- Fanaa (2010 film), an Indian drama film
- Fanaa: Ishq Mein Marjawan, an Indian thriller drama television series
- Fana (Black Clover), a character in the manga series Black Clover
- "Fanaa", a song from the soundtrack of the 2004 Indian film Yuva

== Media ==
- Fana Broadcasting Corporation, an Ethiopian news media company
  - Fana TV, a satellite television news channel in Ethiopia owned by FBC

== Religion ==
- Fana (Sufism), the Sufi term for "annihilation of the self"
- fana, Latin plural of fanum, a sacred precinct or shrine in ancient Roman religion

== Sports ==
- Fana IL, multi-sport club in Fana, Bergen, Norway
  - Fana Håndball, women's handball team of Fana IL
- FIK BFG Fana, a Norwegian athletics club from Fana in Bergen

== FANA ==
- Federation of Arab News Agencies
- Federally Administered Northern Areas, now known as Gilgit-Baltistan, Pakistan
- National Air Force of Angola (Portuguese: Força Aérea Nacional de Angola)
- Fiji American National Association, a group for Fijian Americans

== See also ==
- Fana-Khusrau (fl. 1040), son of the Buyid amir Majd al-Dawla of Iran
- Abu Ali Fana-Khusrau (died 1094), son of the Buyid ruler Abu Kalijar
- Karim Aït-Fana (born 1989), French-Moroccan footballer
- Fanai, a village in Khoy County, West Azerbaijan Province, Iran
- Fanas, a former municipality in Graubünden, Switzerland
- Fane (disambiguation)
- Fanam (disambiguation)
