= Am Chonthicha =

Thai singer

Am Chonthicha แอ้ม ชลธิชา
- Born: Chonthicha Chaimanee (Thai: ชลธิชา ไชยมณี); 28 March 2005 (age 21); Chanuman District, Amnat Charoen Province, Thailand
- Genres: Luk thung; Mor lam
- Occupation: Singer
- Instrument: Vocal
- Years active: 2022–present
- Label: Phu Tai Records · Song 'de · Grammy Gold · GMM Music

Chonthicha Chaimanee (Thai: ชลธิชา ไชยมณี, also spelled Cholticha; born 28 March 2005), known mononymously as Am Cholticha (Thai: แอ้ม ชลธิชา) or Am Noi (Thai: แอ้มน้อย) is a Thai Luk thung singer from Isan area. She was a twenty first-time champions in the music contest presented by One 31. She populared by her second single, The Promise at Chanuman (คำสัญญาที่ชานุมาน) in October 2022.

She was born into a poor family and she lived with her grandmother when her young. She populared on TikTok since 2021 and she attended to contest on the stage Dual Phleng Ching Thun, so she keep to champions with 21st time. In 2023, she registed to GMM Grammy with suggestion by Sala Khunnawut.

== Early life ==
=== 2006–2019 : Background life and education ===
She was born into a very poor family in Tambon Kok Sarn Amphoe Chanuman, in Amnat Charoen Province. Her parents went to work in Bangkok, so she lived with her grandmother when she was young. She loved singing and was trained by her grandmother.

She was finished high school at Chanumanwittayakhom School., and she studying at Mahasarakham University.

== Musical career ==
=== 2019–2022 : Start on stage ===
She started to contest on the many stage in Amnat Charoen, but she lost. In 2021, she populared with her TikTok video which she cover the song title Fak Phleng Thueng Yai, original by Tai Orathai. She released a first single Nong Ma Lar under Phu Tai records in February 2022. She attended to contest in the music contest Dual Phleng Ching Thun which on air at One 31.

=== 2022 : The Promise at Chanuman and popular ===
She released second single The Promise at Chanuman (คำสัญญาที่ชานุมาน) which lyrics and melody by a famous Luk thung songwriter, Sala Khunnawut. The Promise at Chanuman have content about Ku Giant Festival and Larb Pla Kang which are icon of Chanuman District. The Promise at Chanuman to hit No. 1 on Thai music charts in December 2022 and earning 17M YouTube views as of 6 May 2023.

She registed to GMM Grammy in January 2023. She released another single include Tang Wai Ai Phoo Bao and Rice Wrap of the Poor Girl (ห่อข้าวสาวบ้านนอก).

== Discography ==
=== Single ===
Year	Title	Label
2022	"Nong Ma Lar"	Phu Tai records
2022	The Promise At Chanuman (คำสัญญาที่ชานุมาน)	Song 'de (owned by Khaokwan Khunnawut)
2022	Worship to Thao Wessuwanna (ขอพรท้าวเวสสุวรรณวัดไร่ขิง) (Original by Joi Maithongkham)	Song 'de (owned by Khaokwan Khunnawut)
2023	My Dear, Pha Daeng (ผาแดงของน้อง) (Original by Tai Orathai)	GMM Grammy
2023	"Tang Wai Ai Phoo Bao" (ตังหวายอายผู้บ่าว) (Original by Siriporn Ampaipong)	GMM Grammy
2023	Rice Wrap of the Poor Girl (ห่อข้าวสาวบ้านนอก)	GMM Grammy
