= Lao Suea Kok district =

Lao Suea Kok เหล่าเสือโก้ก
- District
- Districtlocation in Ubon Ratchathani province
- Coordinates: 15°24′24″N 104°55′24″E
- Country: Thailand
- Province: Ubon Ratchathani
- Seat: Lao Suea Kok

Area
  - Total: 284.0 km^{2} (109.7 sq mi)

Population (2005)
  - Total: 25,767
  - Density: 90.7/km^{2} (235/sq mi)
- Time zone: UTC+7 (ICT)
- Postal code: 34000
- Geocode: 3431

Lao Suea Kok (Thai: เหล่าเสือโก้ก, pronounced [làw sɯ̌a kôːk]; Northeastern Thai: เหล่าเสือโก้ก, pronounced [lāw sɯ̌a kôːk]) is a district (amphoe) in the northern part of Ubon Ratchathani province, northeastern Thailand.

== History ==
Lao Suea Kok was separated from Mueang Ubon Ratchathani district to create a minor district (king amphoe) on 30 April 1994.

On 15 May 2007, all 81 minor districts were upgraded to full districts. On 24 August the upgrade became official.

== Geography ==
Neighboring districts are (from the north clockwise): Phana of Amnat Charoen province; Trakan Phuet Phon, Don Mot Daeng, Mueang Ubon Ratchathani and Muang Sam Sip of Ubon Ratchathani Province.

== Administration ==
The district is divided into four sub-districts (tambons), which are further subdivided into 53 villages (mubans). There are no municipal (thesaban) areas, and three tambon administrative organizations (TAO).

No.	Name	Thai name	Villages	Pop.
1.	Lao Suea Kok	เหล่าเสือโก้ก	10	7,372
2.	Phon Mueang	โพนเมือง	17	6,891
3.	Phaeng Yai	แพงใหญ่	13	4,544
4.	Nong Bok	หนองบก	13	6,960
