= Fane =

Fane may refer to:

== People ==
- Fane (surname)
  - Fane family, an English family
- Viscount Fane, an extinct title in the Peerage of Ireland
- Fane Flaws (1951–2021), New Zealand musician, songwriter and artist
- Fane Lozman, American inventor and trader

== Places ==
- River Fane in Ireland
- Fane, Papua New Guinea, a village associated with Simona Noorenbergh
  - Fane Airport, an airfield serving Fane

== Organizations ==
- Fédération d'action nationale et européenne, a French former neo-Nazi organization
- Fane Aircraft Company, a defunct British aircraft manufacturer

== See also ==
- Fain (disambiguation)
- Fana (disambiguation)
- Fané
- Phanes (disambiguation)
- Vane (disambiguation)
