= Hat Chom Dao =

Hat Chom Dao or Kaeng Chom Dao (Thai: หาดชมดาว/แก่งชมดาว) is a Thai tourist attraction. It sits on the Mekong River in Tambon Na Tan, Na Tan District, Ubon Ratchathani Province, Thailand. It is a rock formation, which is overtopped by the river during high tide but becomes accessible during the dry season. Tourists are attracted by the area because of its beautiful shape. Many surf in the Mekong during the wet season. Highlights include sunrise and sunset views, as well as stargazing at night. During the dry season beach is white fine sand grains a width of about 2 km. Beaches are only visible during the winter or low tide.

== History ==
Villagers claimed that in the past, fishermen who were out fishing or relaxing overnight stayed at this beach.

== Sites ==
Besides the white sand beach along the Mekong River at some point it became shaped like a skull, heart. It features 10 + emerald wells, caused by erosion from wind, water and sunlight with a long duration of several hundred years. It has a mid-river cliff which shows traces of erosion. The natural stone is similar to stalactites. The local administration organizes a climbing activity in this area annually.

The area includes several points of interest:

- Ta-Uarn cave
- Ta-ma cave
- Korn samsao
- Chong sawsork
- Grand Canyon Natal
- Mekong River Sculpture
- Kaeng Hin Ngam or Hin Chao stone, Wat Pha Jai, Pha Daow
- Chong biadsoud
- Makoi Pools
- The Mekong Strait
- Chom Dao Beach or White Sand Beach
