= Wat Phra Lao Thep Nimit =

Coordinates: 15.676886°N 104.853986°E

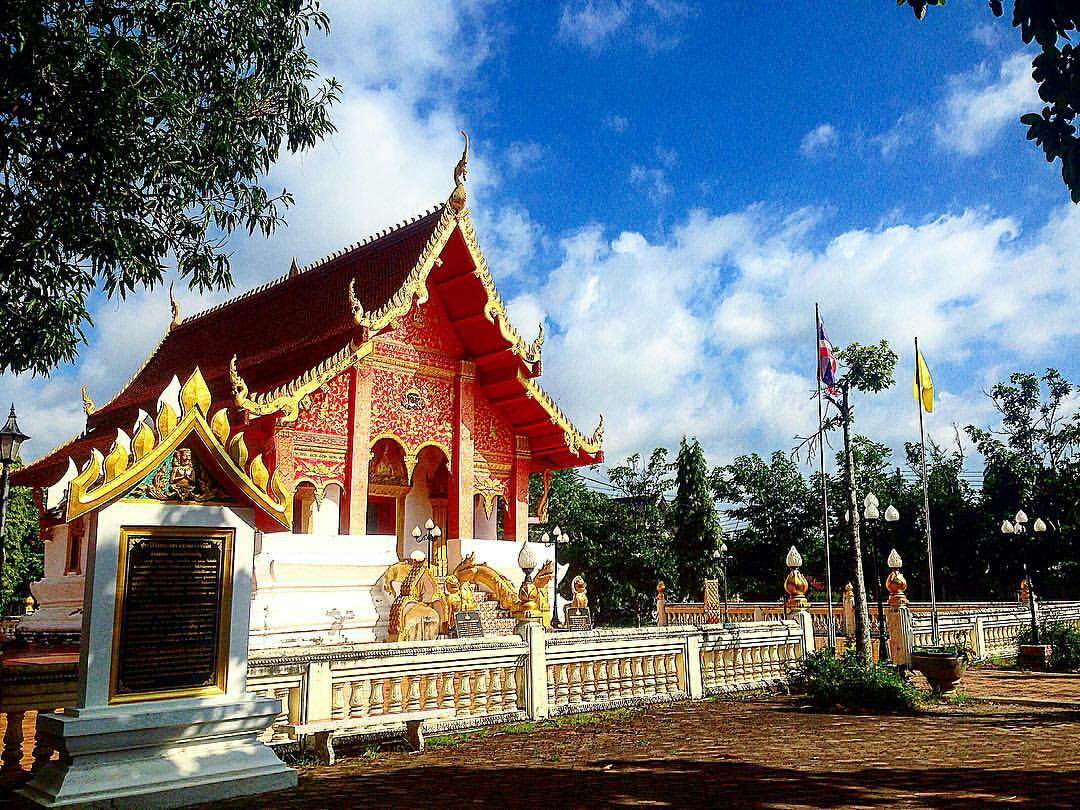
Ubosot of Wat Phra Lao Thep Nimit

Wat Phra Lao Thep Nimit (Thai: วัดพระเหลาเทพนิมิตร) is a Buddhist temple in Amnat Charoen Province, Thailand, situated on Highway 2134, 2 km from Amphoe Phana.

The temple has a Lanna-style ordination hall which houses the principal Buddha image Phra Lao Thep Nimit. Built in 1720, the Buddha image, in subduing Mara (demon) attitude decorated by gold leaves, is considered the most beautiful Buddha image of Northeast Region. The art style mirrors Laotian art style from Vientiane which is influenced by Lanna during the 16th–17th Century. The Buddha image was probably built a bit after such period, assumed from appearance of local art style such as facial pattern, higher flame over the head, lap and feet which are similar to those of wooden and bronze Buddha statues from the 18th–19th century.
