= Kut Khaopun district =

Kut Khaopun กุดข้าวปุ้น
- District
- District location in Ubon Ratchathani province
- Coordinates: 15°47′30″N 104°59′48″E
- Country: Thailand
- Province: Ubon Ratchathani
- Seat: Khaopun

Area
  - Total: 320.0 km^{2} (123.6 sq mi)

Population (2005)
  - Total: 39,824
  - Density: 124.5/km^{2} (322/sq mi)
- Time zone: UTC+7 (ICT)
- Postal code: 34270
- Geocode: 3412

Kut Khaopun (Thai: กุดข้าวปุ้น, pronounced [kùt kʰâːw.pûn]; Northeastern Thai: กุดข้าวปุ้น, pronounced [kǔt kʰàːw.pûn]) is a district (amphoe) in the northern part of Ubon Ratchathani province, northeastern Thailand.

== History ==
The minor district (king amphoe) Kut Khaopun was created on 12 July 1971, when the four tambons Khaopun, Ka Bin, Kaeng Kheng, and Non Sawang were split off from Trakan Phuet Phon district. It was upgraded to a full district on 25 March 1979.

== Geography ==
Neighboring districts are (from the northeast clockwise) Khemarat, Pho Sai, Trakan Phuet Phon of Ubon Ratchathani Province and Pathum Ratchawongsa of Amnat Charoen province.

== Administration ==
The district is divided into five sub-districts (tambons), which are further subdivided into 73 villages (mubans). Kut Khaopun is a township (thesaban tambon) which covers parts of tambon Khaopun. There are a further five tambon administrative organizations (TAO).

No.	Name	Thai name	Villages	Pop.
1.	Khaopun	ข้าวปุ้น	15	9,426
2.	Non Sawang	โนนสวาง	20	10,503
3.	Kaeng Kheng	แก่งเค็ง	13	7,401
4.	Ka Bin	กาบิน	12	5,253
5.	Nong Than Nam	หนองทันน้ำ	13	7,241
