= Pathum Ratchawongsa district =

Pathum Ratchawongsa ปทุมราชวงศา
- District
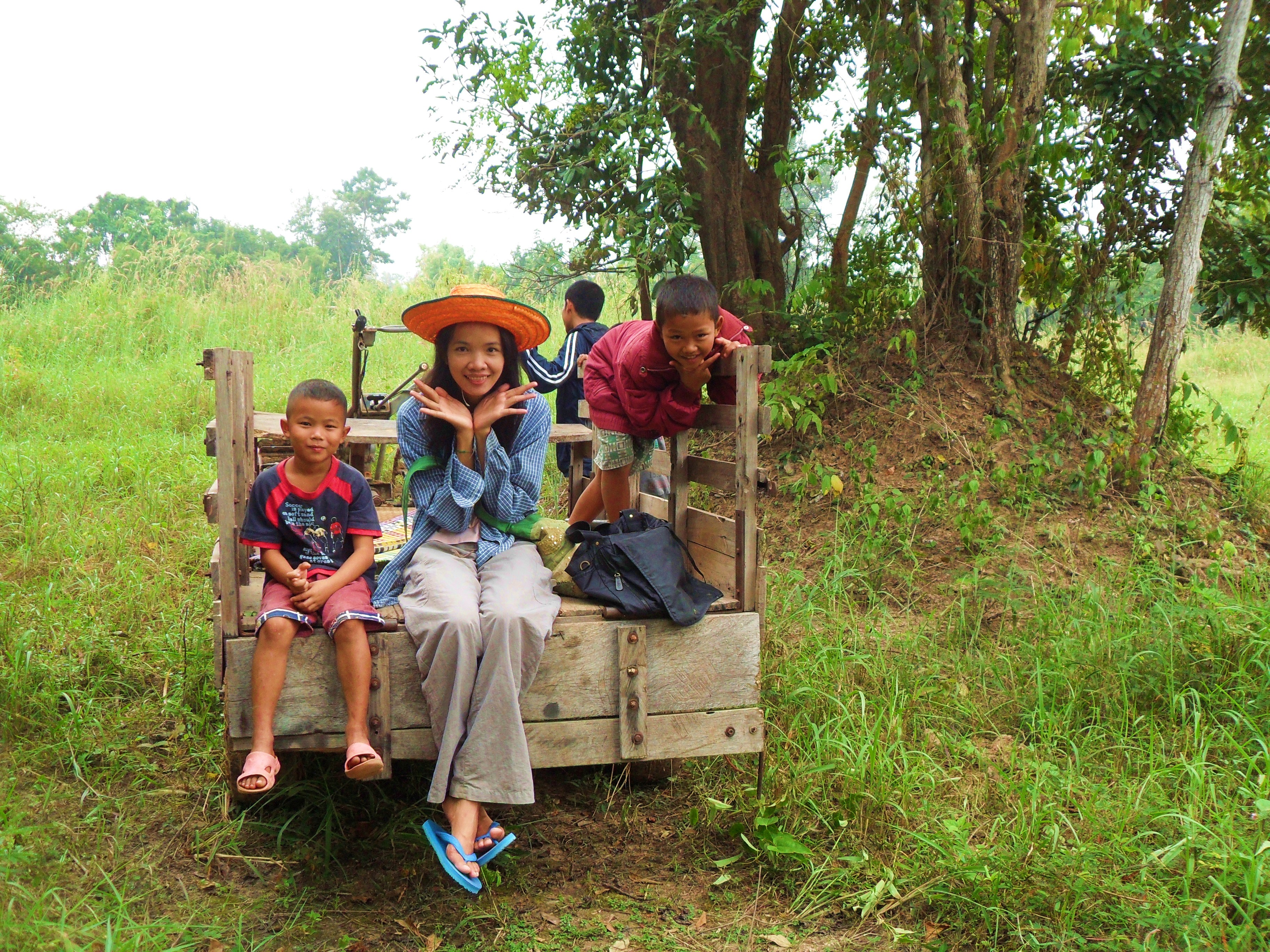
- Children at Non Ngam village

- District location in Amnat Charoen province
- Coordinates: 15°53′32″N 104°54′21″E
- Country: Thailand
- Province: Amnat Charoen
- Seat: Na Wa

Area
  - Total: 520.8 km^{2} (201.1 sq mi)

Population (2005)
  - Total: 46,100
  - Density: 88.5/km^{2} (229/sq mi)
- Time zone: UTC+7 (ICT)
- Postal code: 37110
- Geocode: 3703

Pathum Ratchawongsa (Thai: ปทุมราชวงศา, pronounced [pā.tʰūm râːt.tɕʰā.wōŋ.sǎː]; Northeastern Thai: ปทุมราชวงศา, pronounced [pā.tʰûm lâːt.sā.wôŋ.sǎː]) is a district (amphoe) in the eastern part of Amnat Charoen province, northeastern Thailand.

== Geography ==
Neighboring districts are (from the south clockwise): Phana, Mueang Amnat Charoen, and Chanuman of Amnat Charoen Province; Khemarat, Kut Khaopun, and Trakan Phuet Phon of Ubon Ratchathani province.

== History ==
The district was created on 2 July 1993, consisting of the three tambons, Kham Phon, Nong Kha, and Na Wa from Chanuman district, Lue and Huai from Phana district and Non Ngam from Mueang Amnat Charoen district.

== Administration ==
The district is divided into seven sub-districts (tambons), which are further subdivided into 73 villages (mubans). Na Wa Yai is a sub-district municipality (thesaban tambon) which covers parts of tambons Na Wa and Na Pa Saeng. There are a further seven tambon administrative organizations (TAO).

No.	Name	Thai name	Villages	Pop.
1.	Nong Kha	หนองข่า	9	6,259
2.	Kham Phon	คำโพน	10	7,255
3.	Na Wa	นาหว้า	9	7,923
4.	Lue	ลือ	14	8,211
5.	Huai	ห้วย	13	6,996
6.	Non Ngam	โนนงาม	8	3,608
7.	Na Pa Saeng	นาป่าแซง	10	5,848
