= Sawang Wirawong district =

Sawang Wirawong สว่างวีระวงศ์
- District
- District location in Ubon Ratchathani province
- Coordinates: 15°14′29″N 105°5′32″E
- Country: Thailand
- Province: Ubon Ratchathani
- Seat: Sawang

Area
  - Total: 163.0 km^{2} (62.9 sq mi)

Population (2005)
  - Total: 30,170
  - Density: 110/km^{2} (280/sq mi)
- Time zone: UTC+7 (ICT)
- Postal code: 34190
- Geocode: 3432

Sawang Wirawong (Thai: สว่างวีระวงศ์, pronounced [sā.wàːŋ wīː.rā.wōŋ]; Northeastern Thai: สว่างวีรวงศ์, pronounced [sā.wāːŋ wi᷇ː lā.wo᷇ŋ]) is a district (amphoe) in the central part of Ubon Ratchathani province, northeastern Thailand.

== History ==
Sawang Wirawong was separated from Warin Chamrap district to create a minor district (king amphoe) on 1 April 1995.

On 15 May 2007, all of the 81 minor districts were upgraded to full districts. On 24 August the upgrade became official.

== Geography ==
Neighboring districts are (from the north clockwise) Don Mot Daeng, Tan Sum, Phibun Mangsahan, Na Yia, Warin Chamrap, and Mueang Ubon Ratchathani.

== Administration ==
The district is divided into four sub-districts (tambons), which are further subdivided into 53 villages (mubans). There are no municipal (thesaban) areas, and four tambon administrative organizations (TAO).

No.	Name	Thai name	Villages	Pop.
1.	Kaeng Dom	แก่งโดม	11	5,300
2.	Tha Chang	ท่าช้าง	18	10,119
3.	Bung Malaeng	บุ่งมะแลง	12	6,978
4.	Sawang	สว่าง	12	7,773
