= Abdul Rahman (Afghan minister) =

Afghan minister (1953–2002)

- Died: February 14, 2002; Kabul
- Known for: Aviation and Tourism minister
- Spouse: Frozan Fana

Abdul Rahman (Arabic: عبد الرحمن; died February 14, 2002) was the Aviation and Tourism minister of Afghanistan until his death on February 14, 2002.

He was murdered in what appeared to be a mob attack on his plane at Kabul International Airport by pilgrims angry that they had been unable to travel to Mecca, Saudi Arabia. Witnesses and officials said pilgrims beat the minister to death and tossed his body to the tarmac. However, President Hamid Karzai accused six senior government officials of the murder, saying that they were motivated by a long-standing feud. Three were arrested and the others were being sought in Saudi Arabia. Karzai said five ministers, including the head of the intelligence ministry, General Abdullah Tawhedi; the technical deputy of the Ministry of Defense, General Qalander Beg, and a Supreme Court justice, Haji Halim and 15 other suspects had been linked to the assassination.

His widow is Frozan Fana, a medical doctor. She was one of only two female candidates in the 2009 Afghan presidential election, which were contested by around 40 candidates.

The news for his death in Japanese was later misunderstood as "Afghan air sumo wrestling killed", instead of "Afghan aviation minister beaten to death", which later became an internet meme on 2channel.
