= Phibun Mangsahan district =

Phibun Mangsahan พิบูลมังสาหาร
- District
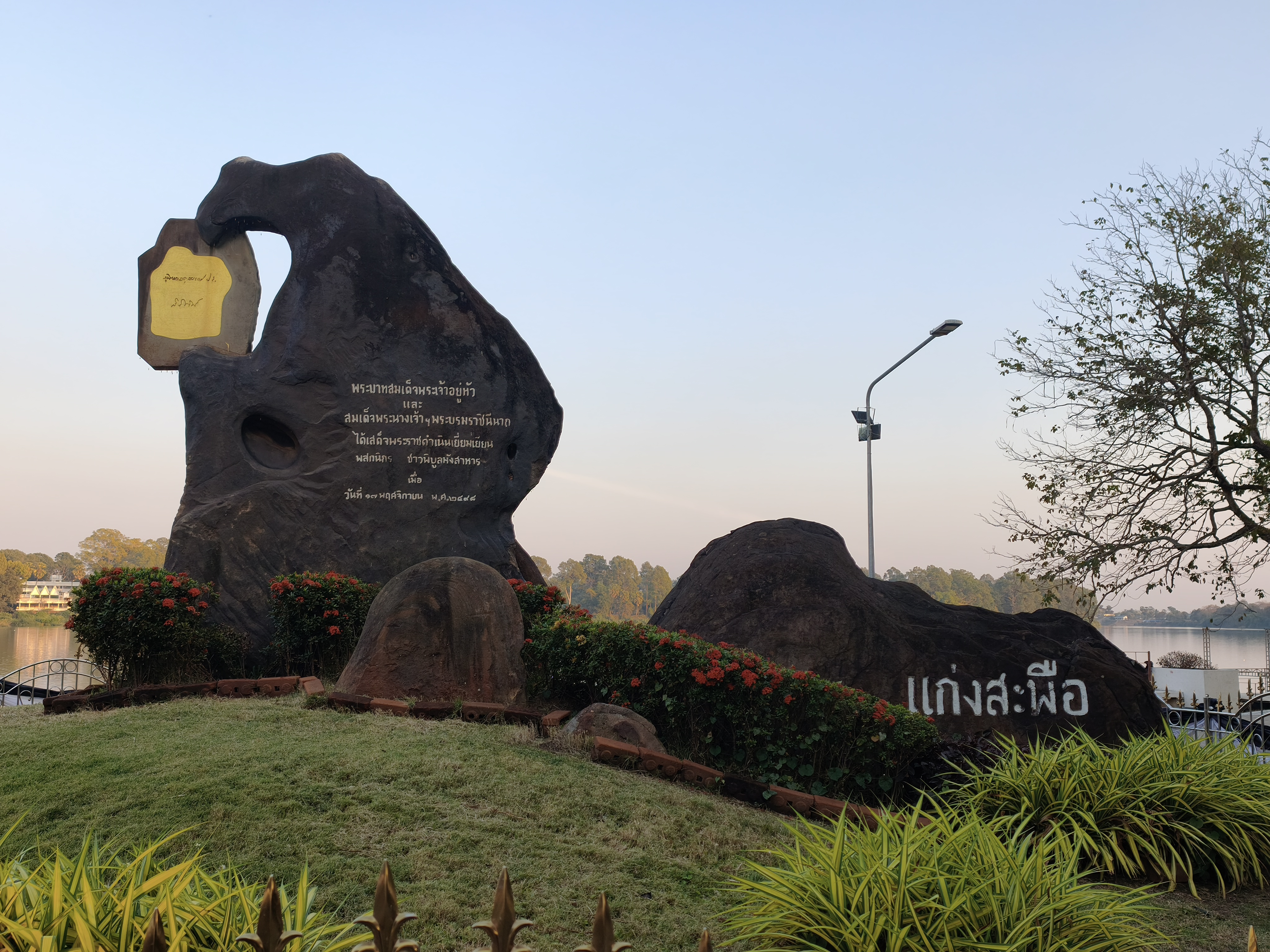
- Kaeng Saphue, Phibun Mangsahan District

- District location in Ubon Ratchathani province
- Coordinates: 15°14′40″N 105°13′44″E
- Country: Thailand
- Province: Ubon Ratchathani
- Seat: Phibun
- Tambon: 14
- Muban: 180

Area
  - Total: 1,280.0 km^{2} (494.2 sq mi)

Population (2016)
  - Total: 132,105
  - Density: 99.5/km^{2} (258/sq mi)
- Time zone: UTC+7 (ICT)
- Postal code: 34110
- Geocode: 3419

Phibun Mangsahan (Thai: พิบูลมังสาหาร, pronounced [pʰí.būːn māŋ.sǎː.hǎːn]) is a district (amphoe) in the central part of Ubon Ratchathani province, northeastern Thailand.

== Geography ==
Neighboring districts are (from the south clockwise): Buntharik, Det Udom, Na Yia, Sawang Wirawong, Tan Sum, Si Mueang Mai, Khong Chiam and Sirindhorn of Ubon Ratchathani Province.

== History ==
Originally named Phimun Mangsahan (พิมูลมังสาหาร), it was renamed to Phibun Mangsahan on 30 July 1940.

== Administration ==
=== Central administration ===
Phibun Mangsahan is divided into 14 sub-districts (tambons), which are further subdivided into 180 administrative villages (mubans).

No.	Name	Thai	Villages	Pop.
1.	Phibun	พิบูล	-	10,712
2.	Kut Chomphu	กุดชมภู	19	14,795
4.	Don Chik	ดอนจิก	23	14,745
5.	Sai Mun	ทรายมูล	10	6,020
6.	Na Pho	นาโพธิ์	11	8,377
7.	Non Klang	โนนกลาง	12	7,648
9.	Pho Sai	โพธิ์ไทร	19	11,931
10.	Pho Si	โพธิ์ศรี	14	12,643
11.	Rawe	ระเว	12	8,505
12.	Rai Tai	ไร่ใต้	15	8,038
13.	Nong Bua Hi	หนองบัวฮี	16	10,706
14.	Ang Sila	อ่างศิลา	12	7,898
18.	Non Kalong	โนนกาหลง	9	4,840
19.	Ban Khaem	บ้านแขม	8	5,247

Missing numbers belong to tambon which now form Sirindhorn District.

=== Local administration ===
There is one town (thesaban mueang) in the district:

- Phibun Mangsahan (Thai: เทศบาลเมืองพิบูลมังสาหาร) consisting of sub-district Phibun.

There are four sub-district municipalities (thesaban tambon) in the district:

- Ang Sila (Thai: เทศบาลตำบลอ่างศิลา) consisting of parts of sub-district Ang Sila.
- Kut Chomphu (Thai: เทศบาลตำบลกุดชมภู) consisting of sub-district Kut Chomphu.
- Pho Sai (Thai: เทศบาลตำบลโพธิ์ไทร) consisting of sub-district Pho Sai.
- Pho Si (Thai: เทศบาลตำบลโพธิ์ศรี) consisting of sub-district Pho Si.

There are 10 sub-district administrative organizations (SAO) in the district:

- Don Chik (Thai: องค์การบริหารส่วนตำบลดอนจิก) consisting of sub-district Don Chik.
- Sai Mun (Thai: องค์การบริหารส่วนตำบลทรายมูล) consisting of sub-district Sai Mun.
- Na Pho (Thai: องค์การบริหารส่วนตำบลนาโพธิ์) consisting of sub-district Na Pho.
- Non Klang (Thai: องค์การบริหารส่วนตำบลโนนกลาง) consisting of sub-district Non Klang.
- Rawe (Thai: องค์การบริหารส่วนตำบลระเว) consisting of sub-district Rawe.
- Rai Tai (Thai: องค์การบริหารส่วนตำบลไร่ใต้) consisting of sub-district Rai Tai.
- Nong Bua Hi (Thai: องค์การบริหารส่วนตำบลหนองบัวฮี) consisting of sub-district Nong Bua Hi.
- Ang Sila (Thai: องค์การบริหารส่วนตำบลอ่างศิลา) consisting of parts of sub-district Ang Sila.
- Non Kalong (Thai: องค์การบริหารส่วนตำบลโนนกาหลง) consisting of sub-district Non Kalong.
- Ban Khaem (Thai: องค์การบริหารส่วนตำบลบ้านแขม) consisting of sub-district Ban Khaem.
