= Muang Sam Sip district =

Muang Sam Sip ม่วงสามสิบ
- District
- District location in Ubon Ratchathani province
- Coordinates: 15°30′39″N 104°43′35″E
- Country: Thailand
- Province: Ubon Ratchathani
- Seat: Muang Sam Sip

Area
  - Total: 917.5 km^{2} (354.2 sq mi)

Population (2005)
  - Total: 82,757
  - Density: 90.2/km^{2} (234/sq mi)
- Time zone: UTC+7 (ICT)
- Postal code: 34140
- Geocode: 3414

Muang Sam Sip (Thai: ม่วงสามสิบ, pronounced [mûaŋ sǎːm sìp]; Northeastern Thai: ม่วงสามสิบ, pronounced [mūaŋ sǎːm sȉp]) is a district (amphoe) in the northwestern part of Ubon Ratchathani province, northeastern Thailand.

== History ==
In 1909 the government merged Kasem Sima and Utarupala Nikhom Districts together and named the new district Utara Ubon. Four years later, the district name was changed back to Kasem Sima. The district office was moved to Ban Muang Sam Sip in 1917, so the district name was changed to fit with the new location. The government built a new the district office there in 1924. The present district office was rebuilt in 1993 in the same area.

== Geography ==
Neighboring districts are (from the east clockwise) Lao Suea Kok, Mueang Ubon Ratchathani, Khueang Nai of Ubon Ratchathani Province and Hua Taphan, Lue Amnat and Phana of Amnat Charoen province.

The important water resources are the Se Bok and Se Bai Rivers.

== Administration ==
The district is divided into 14 sub-districts (tambons), which are further subdivided into 158 villages (mubans). Muang Sam Sip is a township (thesaban tambon) which covers parts of tambon Muang Sam Sip. There are an additional 14 tambon administrative organizations (TAO).

No.	Name	Thai name	Villages	Pop.
1.	Muang Sam Sip	ม่วงสามสิบ	12	9,318
2.	Lao Bok	เหล่าบก	12	5,752
3.	Dum Yai	ดุมใหญ่	13	5,887
4.	Nong Chang Yai	หนองช้างใหญ่	8	4,730
5.	Nong Mueang	หนองเมือง	14	7,873
6.	Toei	เตย	12	7,676
7.	Yang Sak Krapho Lum	ยางสักกระโพหลุ่ม	11	6,356
8.	Nong Khai Nok	หนองไข่นก	8	3,419
9.	Nong Lao	หนองเหล่า	15	6,926
10.	Nong Hang	หนองฮาง	9	4,371
11.	Yang Yo Phap	ยางโยภาพ	13	8,045
12.	Phai Yai	ไผ่ใหญ่	12	4,842
13.	Na Loeng	นาเลิง	9	4,024
14.	Phon Phaeng	โพนแพง	10	3,538
