= Khit =

Type of woven cloth produced in Isan, Thailand

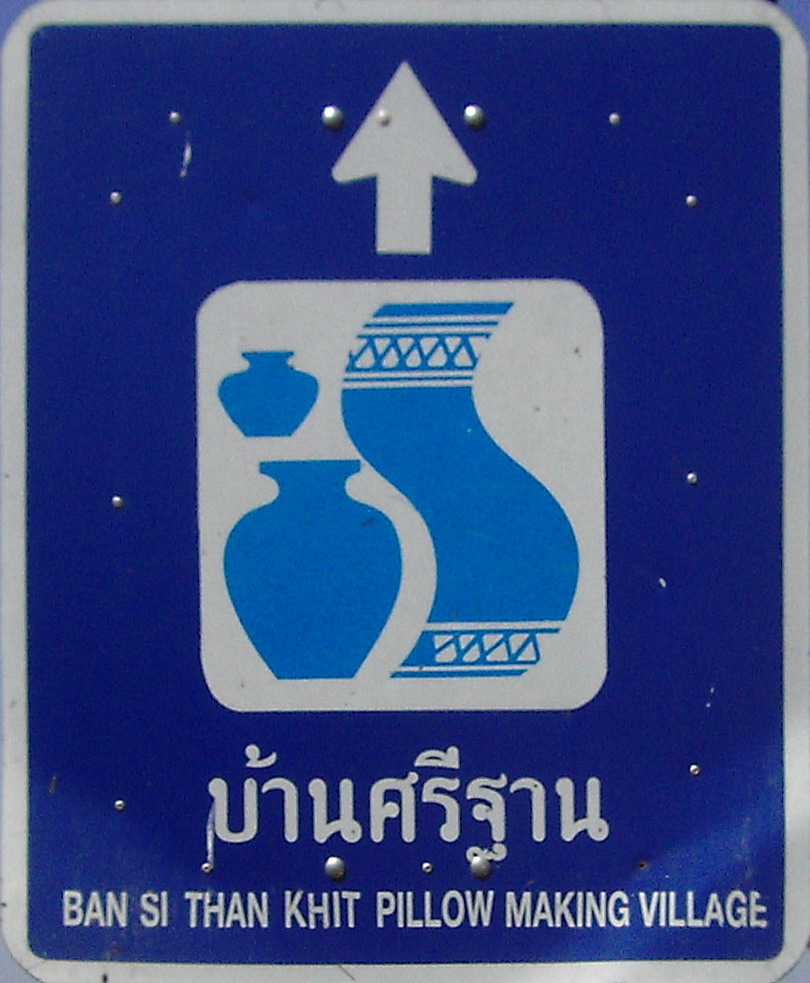
A road sign for the Ban Si Than Khit Pillow Making Village, Tambon Si Than, Amphoe Pa Tio, Yasothon Province, Thailand

Khit or khid (Thai: ผ้าขิด, RTGS: pha khit, pronounced [pʰâː kʰìt]) is an ancient type of woven cloth produced in certain areas of Isan, the northeastern region of Thailand.

== Tradition ==
Khit weaving (Thai: ทอผ้าขิด) is done by hand in traditional looms. It favours certain basic colors, like red, purple and dark green, although other colors are also used. It includes geometric patterns in contrasting colors, usually a darker pattern over a light background, which appears to "float" over it. There are about 72 different patterns which are mostly geometrical, although some have recognizable shapes, like fishes, elephants, or turtles. All patterns have specific traditional names.

Khit is typical of Isan, while chok cloth is part of the weaving tradition of Central Thailand. Other main types of Thai hand-woven textiles are Mudmee and Yok.

Formerly khit cloth was used in the traditional local household dress, like the shoulder cloth, as well as for pillows and bed sheets. It was an ancestral custom for Isan girls to learn to weave khit cloth before getting married and produce some fine items for their future household. Nowadays local-style dress has fallen into disuse and it is confined mostly to folkloric performances or ceremonial or formal wear for men and women.

== Survival ==
The khit-weaving industry survives especially in the Chaiyaphum, Udon Thani, and Yasothon Provinces, as well as in the Amnat Charoen, Kalasin, Mukdahan, Sisaket, and Ubon Ratchathani Provinces.

This ancient weaving tradition has been preserved mostly thanks to the support of HRH Queen Sirikit, who has encouraged villagers to keep their traditions and sell them through the tourism-oriented handicraft marketing organizations. In certain rural areas silk-weaving has been revived since the queen inaugurated a training project at Chitralada Palace in June 1977. The program includes mulberry tree cultivation, silkworm rearing, reeling, dyeing, and weaving into, using a variety of weaving techniques. The revived fabrics include ancient textiles of Thailand like matmi, yokdok (brocade), chok, praewa (mixture of khit and chok patterns), squirrel-tail (hang krarok), and plain silk cloth.

One of the main items sold nowadays to tourists is the khit-pillow, where the patterns of traditional khit cloth are displayed.

== See also ==
- Isan
- Thai-style dresses
