= Pho Sai district =

Pho Sai โพธิ์ไทร
- District
- District location in Ubon Ratchathani province
- Coordinates: 15°49′33″N 105°15′39″E
- Country: Thailand
- Province: Ubon Ratchathani
- Seat: Pho Sai

Area
  - Total: 301.0 km^{2} (116.2 sq mi)

Population (2005)
  - Total: 42,142
  - Density: 140/km^{2} (360/sq mi)
- Time zone: UTC+7 (ICT)
- Postal code: 34340
- Geocode: 3421

Pho Sai (Thai: โพธิ์ไทร, pronounced [pʰōː sāj]) is a district (amphoe) in the northeastern part of Ubon Ratchathani province, northeastern Thailand.

== History ==
A group of people from Khemarat district moved to Ban Klang and Ban Nong Khun in 1820. They named their new town Ban Pho Sai.

The minor district (king amphoe) was created on 5 May 1981, when the three tambons Pho Sai, Muang Yai, and Samrong were split off from Khemarat District. It was upgraded to a full district on 12 August 1987.

== Etymology ==
Pho and sai trees are kinds of Ficus species that grow in Wat Si Bunrueang.

== Geography ==
Neighboring districts are (from the southeast clockwise) Si Mueang Mai, Trakan Phuet Phon, Kut Khaopun, Khemarat, and Na Tan. To the northeast across the Mekong River is the Laotian province of Salavan.

== Administration ==
The district is divided into six sub-districts (tambons), which are further subdivided into 68 villages (mubans). Pho Sai is a township (thesaban tambon) which covers parts of tambon Pho Sai. There are a further six tambon administrative organizations (TAO), all part of Ubon Ratchathani Province. The largest sub-district is Pho Sai.

No.	Name	Thai name	Villages	Pop.
1.	Pho Sai	โพธิ์ไทร	16	11,027
2.	Muang Yai	ม่วงใหญ่	15	5,905
3.	Samrong	สำโรง	10	6,946
4.	Song Khon	สองคอน	9	6,109
5.	Saraphi	สารภี	9	6,902
6.	Lao Ngam	เหล่างาม	9	5,253
