= Fané =

Fané is a surname. Notable people with the surname include:

- Lassana Fané (born 1987), Malian footballer
- Ousmane Fané (born 1993), French footballer

== See also ==
- Fane (disambiguation)
