= Mueang Ubon Ratchathani district =

Mueang Ubon Ratchathani เมืองอุบลราชธานี
- District
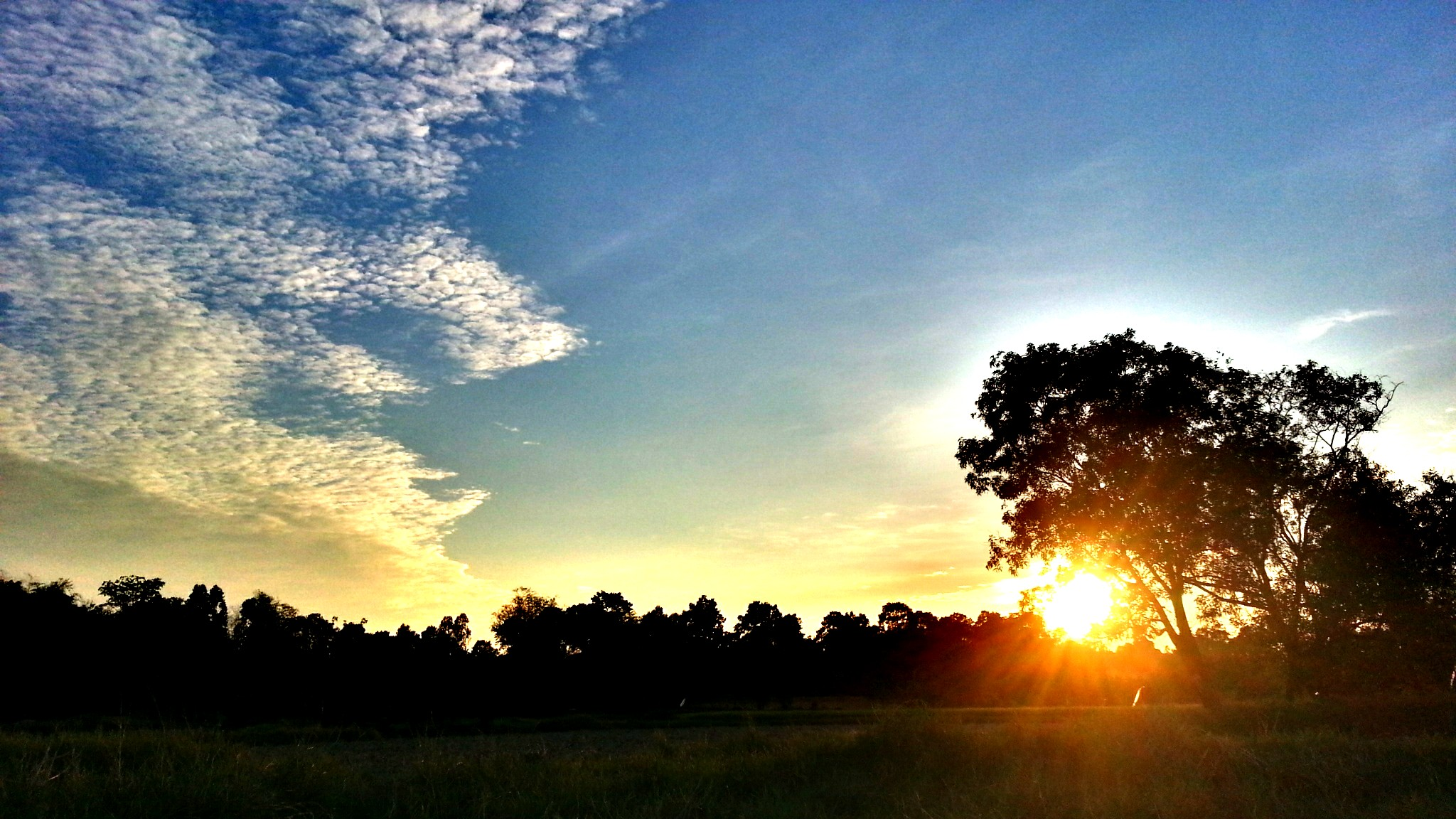

- District location in Ubon Ratchathani province
- Coordinates: 15°13′44″N 104°51′15″E
- Country: Thailand
- Province: Ubon Ratchathani
- Seat: Nai Mueang

Area
  - Total: 406.4 km^{2} (156.9 sq mi)

Population (2005)
  - Total: 211,855
  - Density: 521.3/km^{2} (1,350/sq mi)
- Time zone: UTC+7 (ICT)
- Postal code: 34000
- Geocode: 3401

Mueang Ubon Ratchathani (Thai: เมืองอุบลราชธานี, pronounced [mɯ̄aŋ ʔù.bōn râːt.tɕʰā.tʰāː.nīː]; Northeastern Thai: เมืองอุบลราชธานี, pronounced [mɯ᷇aŋ ʔǔ.bōn lâːt.sā.tʰa᷇ː.ni᷇ː]) is the capital district (amphoe mueang) of Ubon Ratchathani province, northeastern Thailand.

== History ==
The district was originally named Buphupalanikhom (บุพุปลนิคม). Later the name was changed to Burapha Ubon (บูรพาอุบล) in 1909 and Mueang Ubon Ratchathani in 1913.

== Geography ==
Neighboring districts are (from the west clockwise): Khueang Nai, Muang Sam Sip, Lao Suea Kok, Don Mot Daeng, Sawang Wirawong, and Warin Chamrap; of Ubon Ratchathani Province and Kanthararom of Sisaket province.

The important water resource is the Mun River.

== Administration ==
The district is divided into 12 sub-districts (tambons), which are further subdivided into 148 villages (mubans). The city (thesaban nakhon) Ubon Ratchathani covers the entire tambon Nai Mueang. Ubon is a township (thesaban tambon) which covers parts of tambons Kham Yai and Chaeramae. There are a further 11 tambon administrative organizations (TAO).

No.	Name	Thai name	Villages	Pop.
1.	Nai Mueang	ในเมือง	-	86,809
4.	Hua Ruea	หัวเรือ	14	8,968
5.	Nong Khon	หนองขอน	15	8,436
7.	Pathum	ปทุม	12	10,294
8.	Kham Yai	ขามใหญ่	24	30,471
9.	Chaeramae	แจระแม	10	12,622
11.	Nong Bo	หนองบ่อ	13	7,595
12.	Rai Noi	ไร่น้อย	17	19,589
13.	Krasop	กระโสบ	12	5,565
16.	Ku Talat	กุดลาด	13	10,178
19.	Khilek	ขี้เหล็ก	10	6,024
20.	Pa-ao	ปะอาว	8	5,304

Missing numbers are tambon which form the districts Don Mot Daeng and Lao Suea Kok.

== Climate ==
Ubon Ratchathani has a tropical savanna climate (Aw) with three distinct seasons i.e. the dry winters running from November to January, the build up season running from February through April, and the wet monsoon summers running from May to October. The average annual high temperature in Ubon Ratchathani is 33 °C and the average annual low temperature is 22.1 °C with April being the hottest month and December being the coolest month.

Climate data for Ubon Ratchathani (1981–2010)
Month	Jan	Feb	Mar	Apr	May	Jun	Jul	Aug	Sep	Oct	Nov	Dec	Year
Record high °C (°F)	37.2 (99.0)	39.2 (102.6)	40.6 (105.1)	42.0 (107.6)	41.2 (106.2)	38.3 (100.9)	38.5 (101.3)	35.8 (96.4)	37.1 (98.8)	35.2 (95.4)	36.5 (97.7)	35.9 (96.6)	42.0 (107.6)
Mean daily maximum °C (°F)	31.7 (89.1)	34.0 (93.2)	35.8 (96.4)	36.4 (97.5)	34.7 (94.5)	33.3 (91.9)	32.6 (90.7)	31.9 (89.4)	31.8 (89.2)	31.8 (89.2)	31.4 (88.5)	30.6 (87.1)	33.0 (91.4)
Daily mean °C (°F)	24.2 (75.6)	26.5 (79.7)	28.9 (84.0)	30.0 (86.0)	29.0 (84.2)	28.4 (83.1)	28.0 (82.4)	27.6 (81.7)	27.4 (81.3)	26.8 (80.2)	25.4 (77.7)	23.7 (74.7)	27.2 (81.0)
Mean daily minimum °C (°F)	17.5 (63.5)	19.9 (67.8)	22.5 (72.5)	24.4 (75.9)	24.5 (76.1)	24.4 (75.9)	24.2 (75.6)	23.9 (75.0)	23.7 (74.7)	22.5 (72.5)	20.3 (68.5)	17.8 (64.0)	22.1 (71.8)
Record low °C (°F)	10.0 (50.0)	11.7 (53.1)	10.3 (50.5)	16.4 (61.5)	20.6 (69.1)	20.2 (68.4)	20.0 (68.0)	20.0 (68.0)	19.2 (66.6)	15.9 (60.6)	13.3 (55.9)	8.9 (48.0)	8.9 (48.0)
Average rainfall mm (inches)	2.0 (0.08)	15.4 (0.61)	30.5 (1.20)	86.8 (3.42)	208.6 (8.21)	240.2 (9.46)	254.4 (10.02)	303.3 (11.94)	293.8 (11.57)	123.1 (4.85)	22.6 (0.89)	1.0 (0.04)	1,581.7 (62.27)
Average rainy days	0.6	1.4	3.5	7.5	15.4	17.6	18.8	21.0	19.0	11.3	3.6	0.6	120.3
Average relative humidity (%)	65	63	62	66	75	79	80	82	82	78	71	68	73
Mean daily sunshine hours	7.3	7.5	6.5	6.2	5.1	3.9	3.9	3.8	3.6	4.7	6.2	7.2	5.5
Source 1: Thai Meteorological Department
Source 2: Office of Water Management and Hydrology, Royal Irrigation Department (sun and humidity)
