= Don Mot Daeng district =

Don Mot Daeng, Thailand ดอนมดแดง
- District
- District location in Ubon Ratchathani province
- Coordinates: 15°22′44″N 105°1′38″E
- Country: Thailand
- Province: Ubon Ratchathani
- Seat: Lao Daeng

Area
  - Total: 234.0 km^{2} (90.3 sq mi)

Population (2005)
  - Total: 26,301
  - Density: 112.4/km^{2} (291/sq mi)
- Time zone: UTC+7 (ICT)
- Postal code: 34000
- Geocode: 3424

Don Mot Daeng (Thai: ดอนมดแดง, pronounced [dɔ̄ːn mót dɛ̄ːŋ]; Northeastern Thai: ดอนมดแดง, pronounced [dɔ̄ːn mòt dɛ̄ːŋ]) is a district (amphoe) in the central part of Ubon Ratchathani province, northeastern Thailand. The district is named after the island Don Mot Daeng in the Mun River.

== History ==
The area of the district was split off from Mueang Ubon Ratchathani district and formed a minor district (king amphoe) on 1 April 1991. It was upgraded to a full district on 5 December 1996.

The name Don Mot Daeng means "upland of red ant".

== Geography ==
Neighboring districts are (from the east clockwise): Tan Sum, Sawang Wirawong, Mueang Ubon Ratchathani, Lao Suea Kok and Trakan Phuet Phon of Ubon Ratchathani Province.

The important water resources are the Mun and Se Bok River.

== Administration ==
The district is divided into four sub-districts (tambons), which are further subdivided into 46 villages (mubans). There are no municipal (thesaban) areas, and four tambon administrative organizations (TAO).

No.	Name	Thai name	Villages	Pop.
1.	Don Mot Daeng	ดอนมดแดง	13	8,664
2.	Lao Daeng	เหล่าแดง	13	6,924
3.	Tha Mueang	ท่าเมือง	10	5,996
4.	Kham Hai Yai	คำไฮใหญ่	10	4,717
