= Si Mueang Mai district =

Si Mueang Mai ศรีเมืองใหม่
- District
- District location in Ubon Ratchathani province
- Coordinates: 15°29′43″N 105°16′43″E
- Country: Thailand
- Province: Ubon Ratchathani
- Seat: Na Kham

Area
  - Total: 1,310.0 km^{2} (505.8 sq mi)

Population (2005)
  - Total: 65,443
  - Density: 50/km^{2} (130/sq mi)
- Time zone: UTC+7 (ICT)
- Postal code: 34250
- Geocode: 3402

Si Mueang Mai (Thai: ศรีเมืองใหม่, pronounced [sǐː mɯ̄aŋ màj]; Northeastern Thai: ศรีเมืองใหม่, pronounced [sǐː mɯ̂aŋ māj]) is a district (Amphoe) in the northeastern part of Ubon Ratchathani province, northeastern Thailand; it may also be spelled Sri Mueang Mai.

== History ==
Historically, the area was Khwaeng Mueang Khong Chiam. The head of the khwaeng was Upahad (อุปฮาด), who reported to the governor of Ubon Ratchathani. In 1903 the office of Khong Chiam was moved from Ban Na Kho to Ban Na Pho Klang.

In 1912 the office of Khwaeng Mueang Khong Chiam Tai was moved to Ban Na Ueat, Tambon Na Kham. In 1914 was moved again to Ban Dan Pak Mun, Tambon Suwan Wari Noi, and subsequently the district was renamed "Suwan Warin". In 1939 it got back its historical name Khong Chiam. Finally the district office was moved to Rong Kham Ma Chok in 1957.

On 14 September 1971 the Khong Chiam was renamed "Si Mueang Mai". At the same time the district Ban Dan, split off from Khong Chiam in 1959, received the name Khong Chiam, as it contained the central part of the historical mueang.

== Geography ==
Neighboring districts are (from the southeast clockwise): Khong Chiam, Phibun Mangsahan, Tan Sum, Trakan Phuet Phon, and Pho Sai. To the east across the Mekong river is the Laotian province of Salavan.

The important water resource is the Mekong River.

== Administration ==
The district is divided into 11 sub-districts (tambon), which are further subdivided into 118 villages (muban). Si Mueang Mai is the only township (thesaban tambon) of the district, covering parts of the tambon Na Kham. There are a further 11 tambon administrative organizations (TAO).

No.	Name	Thai name	Villages	Pop.
1.	Na Kham	นาคำ	15	12,449
2.	Kaeng Kok	แก้งกอก	7	4,499
3.	Ueat Yai	เอือดใหญ่	8	3,712
4.	Warin	วาริน	11	5,475
5.	Lat Khwai	ลาดควาย	8	4,581
6.	Song Yang	สงยาง	14	6,106
7.	Ta Bai	ตะบ่าย	12	4,175
8.	Kham Lai	คำไหล	18	9,426
9.	Nam Thaeng	หนามแท่ง	11	7,274
10.	Na Loen	นาเลิน	7	3,409
11.	Don Yai	ดอนใหญ่	7	4,337
