= Lue Amnat district =

Lue Amnat ลืออำนาจ
- District
- District location in Amnat Charoen province
- Coordinates: 15°42′6″N 104°38′42″E
- Country: Thailand
- Province: Amnat Charoen
- Seat: Amnat

Area
  - Total: 191.8 km^{2} (74.1 sq mi)

Population (2005)
  - Total: 36,878
  - Density: 192.3/km^{2} (498/sq mi)
- Time zone: UTC+7 (ICT)
- Postal code: 37120
- Geocode: 3707

Lue Amnat (Thai: ลืออำนาจ, pronounced [lɯ̄ː ʔām.nâːt]; Northeastern Thai: ลืออำนาจ, pronounced [lɯ̂ː ʔàm.nâːt]) is a district (amphoe) in the southern part of Amnat Charoen province, northeastern Thailand.

== Geography ==
Neighbouring districts are (from the west clockwise): Hua Taphan, Mueang Amnat Charoen, Phana of Amnat Charoen Province, and Muang Sam Sip of Ubon Ratchathani province.

== History ==
The minor district (king amphoe) was created on 1 April 1991, when six tambons were split off from Mueang Amnat Charoen district. In 1993 it was one of the districts which formed the newly created Amnat Charoen Province. The minor district was upgraded to a full district on 5 December 1996.

== Administration ==
The district is divided into seven sub-districts (tambons), which are further subdivided into 79 villages (mubans). Amnat is a township (thesaban tambon) which covers parts of tambon Amnat. There are a further seven tambon administrative organizations (TAO).

No.	Name	Thai name	Villages	Pop.
1.	Amnat	อำนาจ	11	4,911
2.	Dong Mayang	ดงมะยาง	7	3,964
3.	Pueai	เปือย	13	7,396
4.	Dong Bang	ดงบัง	16	6,463
5.	Rai Khi	ไร่ขี	10	4,600
6.	Maet	แมด	11	4,461
7.	Khok Klang	โคกกลาง	11	5,083
