= Tan Sum district =

Tan Sum ตาลสุม
- District
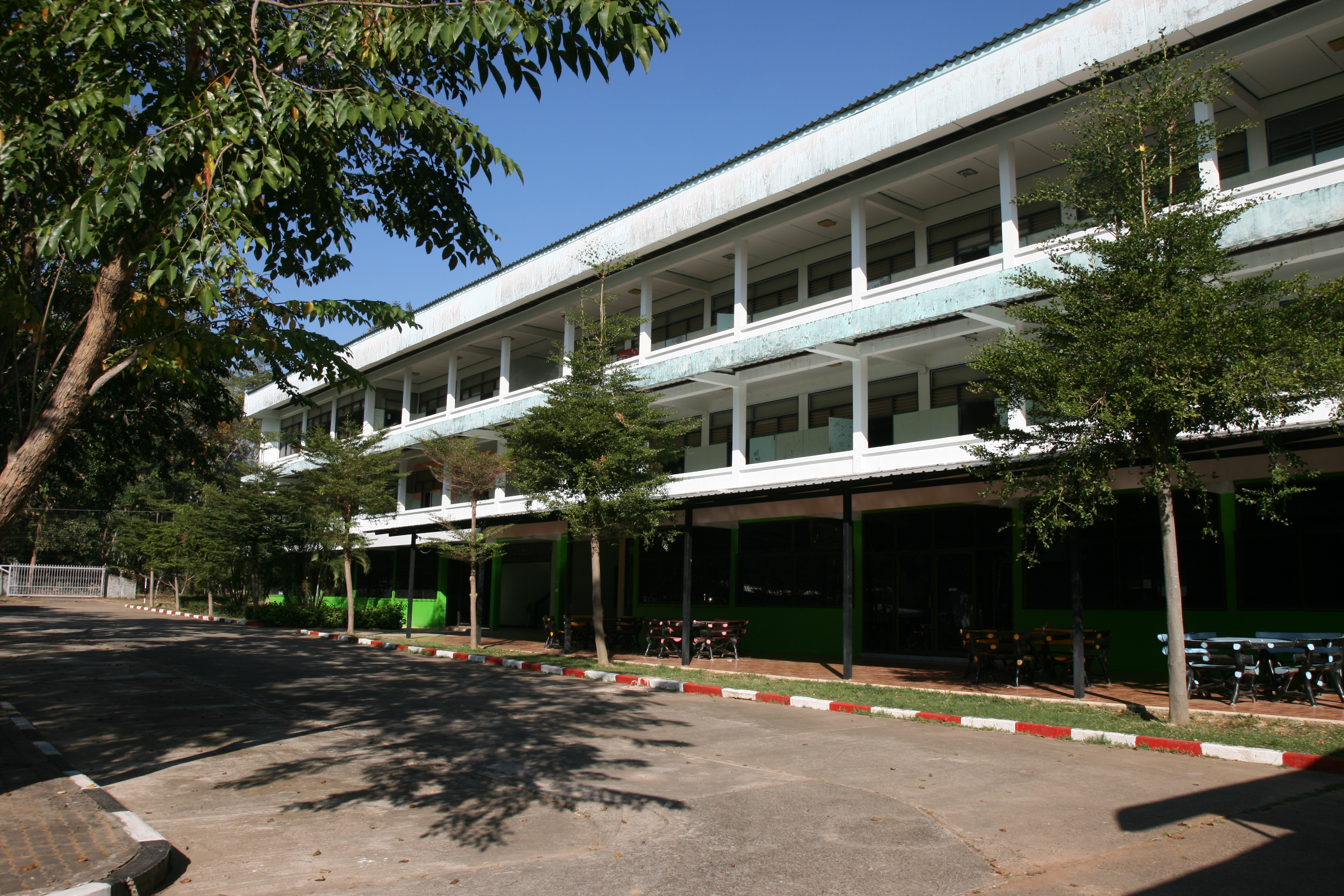
- Building II, Tan Sum Patthana School, a local secondary school

- District location in Ubon Ratchathani province
- Coordinates: 15°18′56″N 105°9′18″E
- Country: Thailand
- Province: Ubon Ratchathani
- Seat: Tan Sum

Area
  - Total: 502.2 km^{2} (193.9 sq mi)

Population (2005)
  - Total: 31,164
  - Density: 62.1/km^{2} (161/sq mi)
- Time zone: UTC+7 (ICT)
- Postal code: 34330
- Geocode: 3420

Tan Sum (Thai: ตาลสุม, pronounced [tāːn sǔm]) is a district (amphoe) in the central part of Ubon Ratchathani province, northeastern Thailand.

== History ==
The minor district (king amphoe) Tan Sum was created on 18 September 1978, when the three tambons Tan Sum, Samrong, and Chik Thoeng were split off from Phibun Mangsahan district. It was upgraded to a full district on 1 January 1988.

== Etymology ==
The old name of the area was Tan Chum (ตาลชุม), which means fertile land with plenty by Toddy palm trees (Borassus flabellifer). Later the name was changed to Tan Sum.

== Geography ==
Neighboring districts are (from the east clockwise): Si Mueang Mai, Phibun Mangsahan, Sawang Wirawong, Don Mot Daeng, and Trakan Phuet Phon of Ubon Ratchathani Province.

The important water resource are the Mun and Se Bok Rivers.

== Administration ==
The district is divided into six sub-districts (tambons), which are further subdivided into 59 villages (mubans). Tan Sum is a township (thesaban tambon) which covers parts of tambon Tan Sum. There are a further six tambon administrative organizations (TAO).

No.	Name	Thai name	Villages	Pop.
1.	Tan Sum	ตาลสุม	15	8,508
2.	Samrong	สำโรง	8	3,778
3.	Chik Thoeng	จิกเทิง	9	5,175
4.	Nong Kung	หนองกุง	8	3,974
5.	Na Khai	นาคาย	13	6,045
6.	Kham Wa	คำหว้า	6	3,684

== Education ==
1. Tansum Phatthana School Tansum Phatthana School is a high school in Tansum County. It is located in Tansum, Ubon Ratchathani, a small town situated 40 km from the town. Students come from several small communities which are similar in economic status.

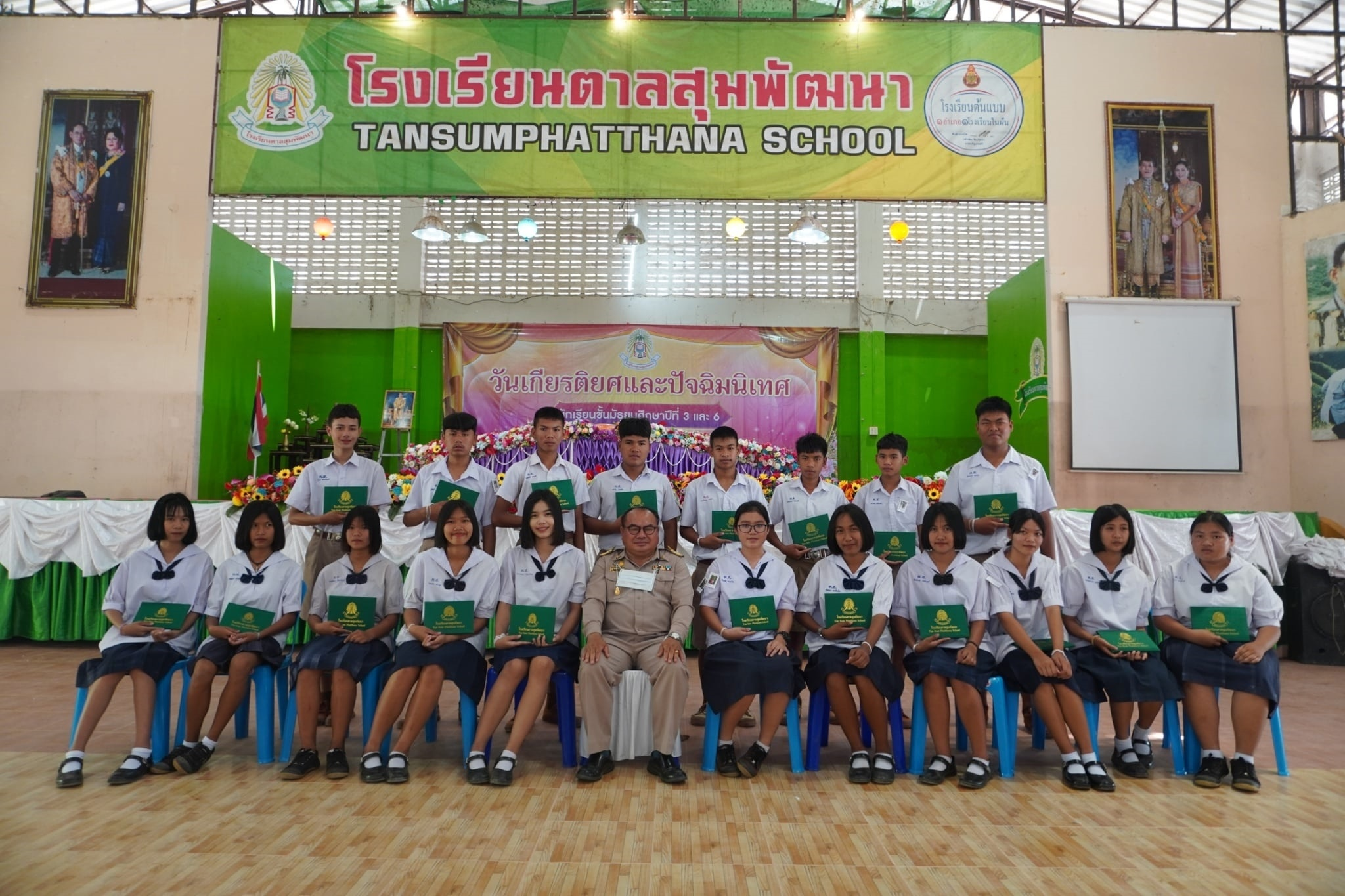
mr.banjong dokin and 2020 students
