= Chanuman district =

Chanuman ชานุมาน
- District
- District location in Amnat Charoen province
- Coordinates: 16°14′0″N 105°0′0″E
- Country: Thailand
- Province: Amnat Charoen
- Seat: Chanuman

Area
  - Total: 555.84 km^{2} (214.61 sq mi)

Population (2005)
  - Total: 37,677
  - Density: 67.8/km^{2} (176/sq mi)
- Time zone: UTC+7 (ICT)
- Postal code: 37210
- Geocode: 3702

Chanuman (Thai: ชานุมาน, pronounced [tɕʰāː.nú(ʔ).māːn]; Northeastern Thai: ชานุมาน, pronounced [sâː.nù(ʔ).mâːn]) is the northeasternmost district (amphoe) of Amnat Charoen province, northeastern Thailand (Isan).

== History ==
Mueang Chanuman Monthon was established in 1879. As it was a subordinate mueang of Ubon Ratchathani, it became a district of Ubon Ratchathani Province during the Thesaphiban administrative reform. Later the city fell into an economic crisis and people migrated to other regions. In 1912 Prince Sapphasitthiprasong downgraded it to a minor district (king amphoe) and made it a subordinate of Khemarat District. It was upgraded to a district again in 1958. In 1993 it was one of the districts that formed the new province, Amnat Charoen.

=== Etymology ===
The district's name came from folklore from both sides of the Mekong: Yak Sa Lue Khue or Yak Ku, a villain ogre who ran out of energy and knelt on the ground, causing holes of various sizes and shapes on the district's land.

The term Chanuman, refers to 'ogre's knee'.

== Geography ==
Chanuman is 85 km (52 mi) from Mueang Amnat Charoen district and 680 km (422 mi) from Bangkok.

Neighboring districts are (from the southeast clockwise): Khemarat of Ubon Ratchathani province; Pathum Ratchawongsa and Senangkhanikhom of Amnat Charoen Province; Loeng Nok Tha of Yasothon province; and Don Tan of Mukdahan province. To the east across the Mekong River is Salavan province of Laos.

The important water resource is the Mekong. It is the only district of the province that is on the Mekong and is a border town.

== Administration ==
The district is divided into five sub-districts (tambons), which are further subdivided into 59 villages (mubans). Chanuman is a township (thesaban tambon) which covers parts of tambon Chanuman. There are a further five tambon administrative organizations (TAO).

No.	Name	Thai name	Villages	Pop.
1.	Chanuman	ชานุมาน	15	9,552
2.	Khok San	โคกสาร	9	5,640
3.	Kham Khuean Kaeo	คำเขื่อนแก้ว	11	8,633
4.	Khok Kong	โคกก่ง	13	6,199
5.	Pa Ko	ป่าก่อ	11	7,653

== Local tradition ==
The parade of Yak Ku, who is the origin of the district's name. which comprise quite a number of locals painting their faces like Yak Ku and competing among others humorously. It is a new festival to promote tourism.

== Notable people ==
- Angkhanang Khunchai: luk thung singer
- Am Cholticha: luk thung singer
