= Phanes (disambiguation) =

Phanes is a Greek deity. Phanes may also refer to:

- Phanes coins, the most ancient inscribed coins, which have the name "Phanes" on them
- Phanes (organic chemistry), a structural sub-unit in nomenclature
- Phanes of Halicarnassus, a councilman serving Amasis, who would eventually help Cambyses II to conquer Egypt
- Phanes (butterfly), a genus of butterflies
