= Melanie Fain =

American printmaker

Melanie Ann (Huckaby) Fain, (born October 14, 1958) is a printmaker specializing in wildlife art. The Texas artist is best known for her etchings and watercolors featuring birds, botanicals, insects, and sporting themes.

Melanie Fain's professional art career began in 1982 when she studied Intaglio printmaking and began creating etchings. Fain cites Thomas Aquinas Daly and Thomas Quinn as important influences in the development of her distinctive style.

Melanie Fain's etchings and watercolors have been included in numerous exhibitions, museums and gallery shows: Birds in Art, in Wausau, Wisconsin; Blossom- The Art of Flowers; Art of the Animal Kingdom in Bennington, Vermont; American Art in Miniature in Tulsa, Oklahoma, and The Society of Animal Artists.

Melanie's work has been featured in periodicals including: Southwest Art Magazine, Wildlife Art Magazine, The Hunting Retriever Magazine, and Gray's Sporting Journal. Melanie's art has been published in two books: Icons of Loss and Grace, written by Susan Hanson, and, Is This Forever or What: Poems and Paintings of Texas, by Naomi Shihab Nye.

Melanie Fain's etchings and watercolors are included in private and public collections including: Leigh Yawkey Woodson Art Museum, Southwest Airlines, COX Communications, Texas Tech University Health Sciences Center, Wells Fargo Bank, and the King Ranch in Kingsville, Texas.
