= Na Tan district =

Na Tan นาตาล
- District
- District location in Ubon Ratchathani province
- Coordinates: 15°54′18″N 105°16′36″E
- Country: Thailand
- Province: Ubon Ratchathani
- Seat: Na Tan

Area
  - Total: 191.9 km^{2} (74.1 sq mi)

Population (2005)
  - Total: 34,735
  - Density: 181/km^{2} (470/sq mi)
- Time zone: UTC+7 (ICT)
- Postal code: 34170
- Geocode: 3430

Na Tan (Thai: นาตาล, pronounced [nāː tāːn]) is a district (amphoe) in the northeastern part of Ubon Ratchathani province, northeastern Thailand.

== History ==
Na Tan area was separated from Khemarat district to create a minor district (king amphoe) on 30 April 1994.

On 15 May 2007, all 81 minor districts were upgraded to full districts. On 24 August the upgrade became official.

=== 6th Thai-Lao Friendship Bridge ===
In 2023 and 2024, Laos and Thailand began talks to improve connections between the two countries. In February 2024, they began talks to upgrade the checkpoint connecting Ban Paek Saeng, Na Tan with Ban Pak Saphan, Salavan province, Laos into a permanent gateway. Before the COVID-19 pandemic, the checkpoint's trade volume was more than ฿2.8 billion.

The checkpoint upgrade will coincide with the construction of the Sixth Thai-Lao Friendship Bridge, which will stretch from Na Tan district in Thailand to Lakhonepheng district in Laos. It will connect National Highway No. 2112 in Thailand with Highway No. 13 in Laos. The project is planned to be 1,607 metres (1,757 yd) long, with the actual bridge being 1,020 metres (1,120 yd). The design of the bridge will include two-lanes of traffic both direction. It is backed by a fund of about ฿4.7 billion.

Construction of the bridge was first proposed in 2019. It initially expected to be complete by 2025 in 2020, but is construction is now expected to begin in 2025 and finish in 2028. Once completed, the bridge is expected to bolster trade between Thailand and Laos. It will also provide a more direct route between Thailand and Da Nang in Vietnam.

== Geography ==
Neighboring districts are (from the south clockwise): Pho Sai and Khemarat. To the east across the Mekong River is the Laotian province of Salavan.

The important water resource is the Mekong.

== Administration ==
The district is divided into four sub-districts (tambons), which are further subdivided into 64 villages (mubans). There are no municipal (thesaban) areas, and four tambon administrative organizations (TAO).

No.	Name	Thai name	Villages	Pop.
1.	Na Tan	นาตาล	19	10,725
2.	Phalan	พะลาน	14	6,046
3.	Kong Phon	กองโพน	13	7,165
4.	Phang Khen	พังเคน	18	10,799
