= Fain-lès-Montbard =

- Commune
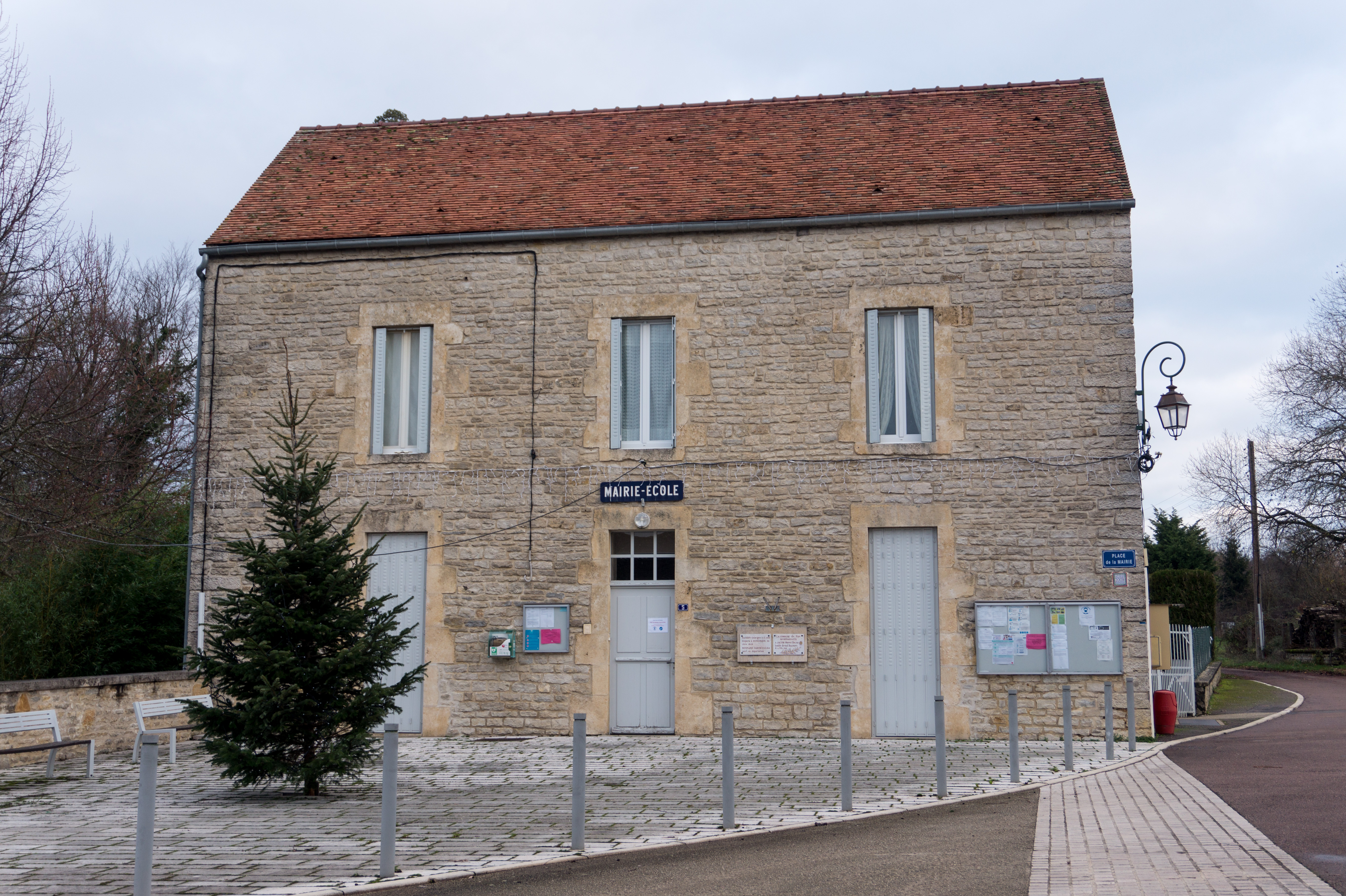
- The town hall (mairie)
- Location of Fain-lès-Montbard
- Location within France Location within Bourgogne-Franche-Comté
- Coordinates: 47°36′29″N 4°24′00″E
- Country: France
- Region: Bourgogne-Franche-Comté
- Department: Côte-d'Or
- Arrondissement: Montbard
- Canton: Montbard
- Intercommunality: Montbardois

Government
  - Mayor (2020–2026): Bernard Pernet
- Area^{1}: 7.48 km^{2} (2.89 sq mi)
- Elevation: 225 m (738 ft)
- Highest elevation: 362 m (1,188 ft)
- Lowest elevation: 213 m (699 ft)
- Population (2023): 269
  - Density: 36.0/km^{2} (93.1/sq mi)
- Demonym: Finois(e)
- Time zone: UTC+01:00 (CET)
  - Summer (DST): UTC+02:00 (CEST)
- INSEE/Postal code: 21259 /21500
- ^{1} French Land Register data, which excludes lakes, ponds, glaciers > 1 km^{2} (0.386 sq mi or 247 acres) and river estuaries.

Fain-lès-Montbard (French pronunciation: [fɛ̃ lɛ mɔ̃baʁ], literally Fain near Montbard) is a commune in the Côte-d'Or department in eastern France.

== Population ==
Historical population
Year	Pop.	±% p.a.
1968	130	—
1975	184	+5.09%
1982	364	+10.24%
1990	341	−0.81%
1999	299	−1.45%
2007	274	−1.09%
2012	309	+2.43%
2017	300	−0.59%
2023	269	−1.80%
Source: INSEE

== History ==
In Gallo-Roman times, a villa was built near an older temple, of which only traces remain.

== Heritage ==
- Saint-Denis church
- Château de Malaisy: it was a luxurious hotel with a restaurant, a swimming pool and a large reception room before its abandonment at the end of 2012 following its bankruptcy. In January 2021, a dead body was found in the château, just before it found a new owner in March 2021.
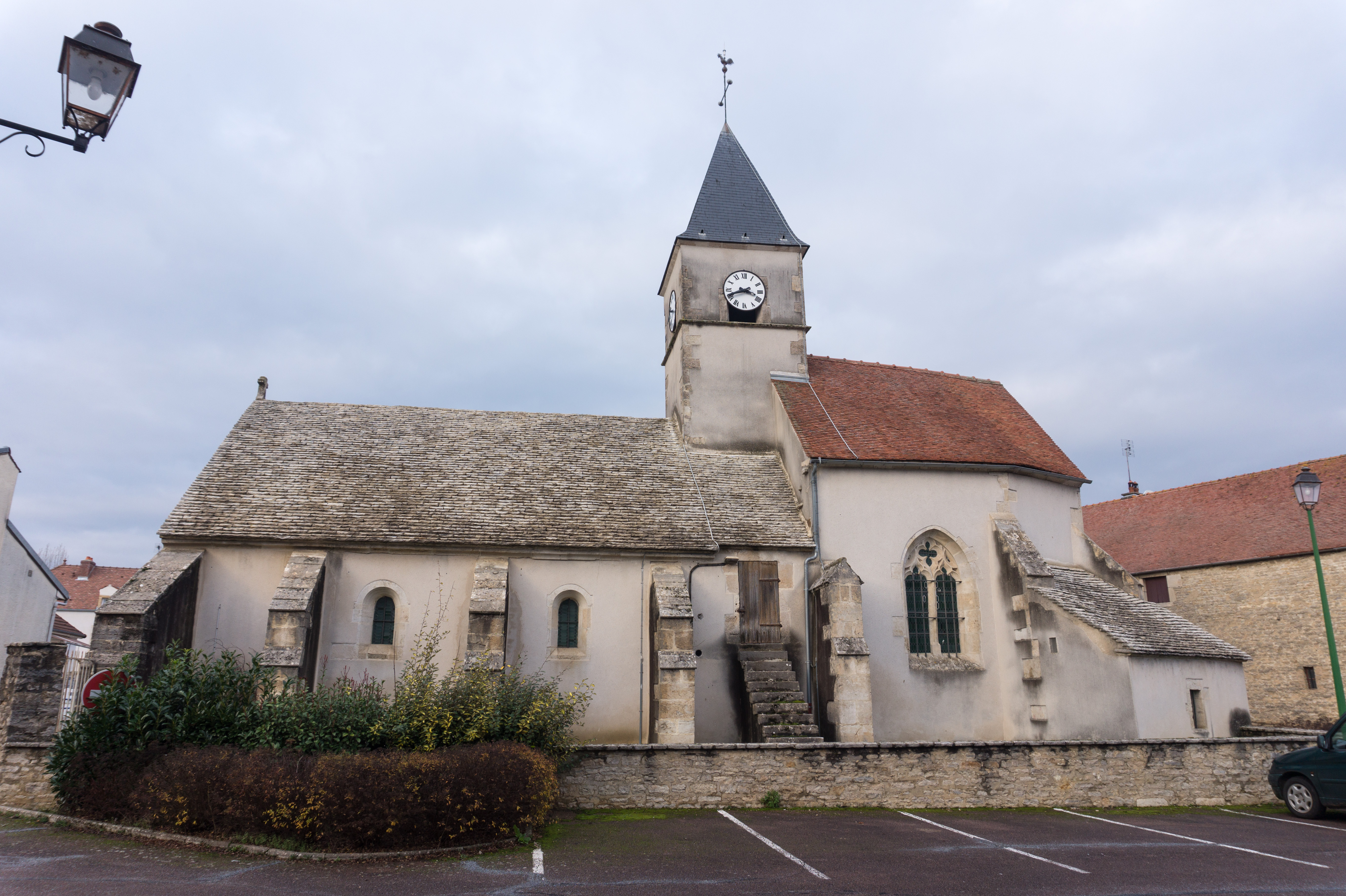
Saint-Denis church

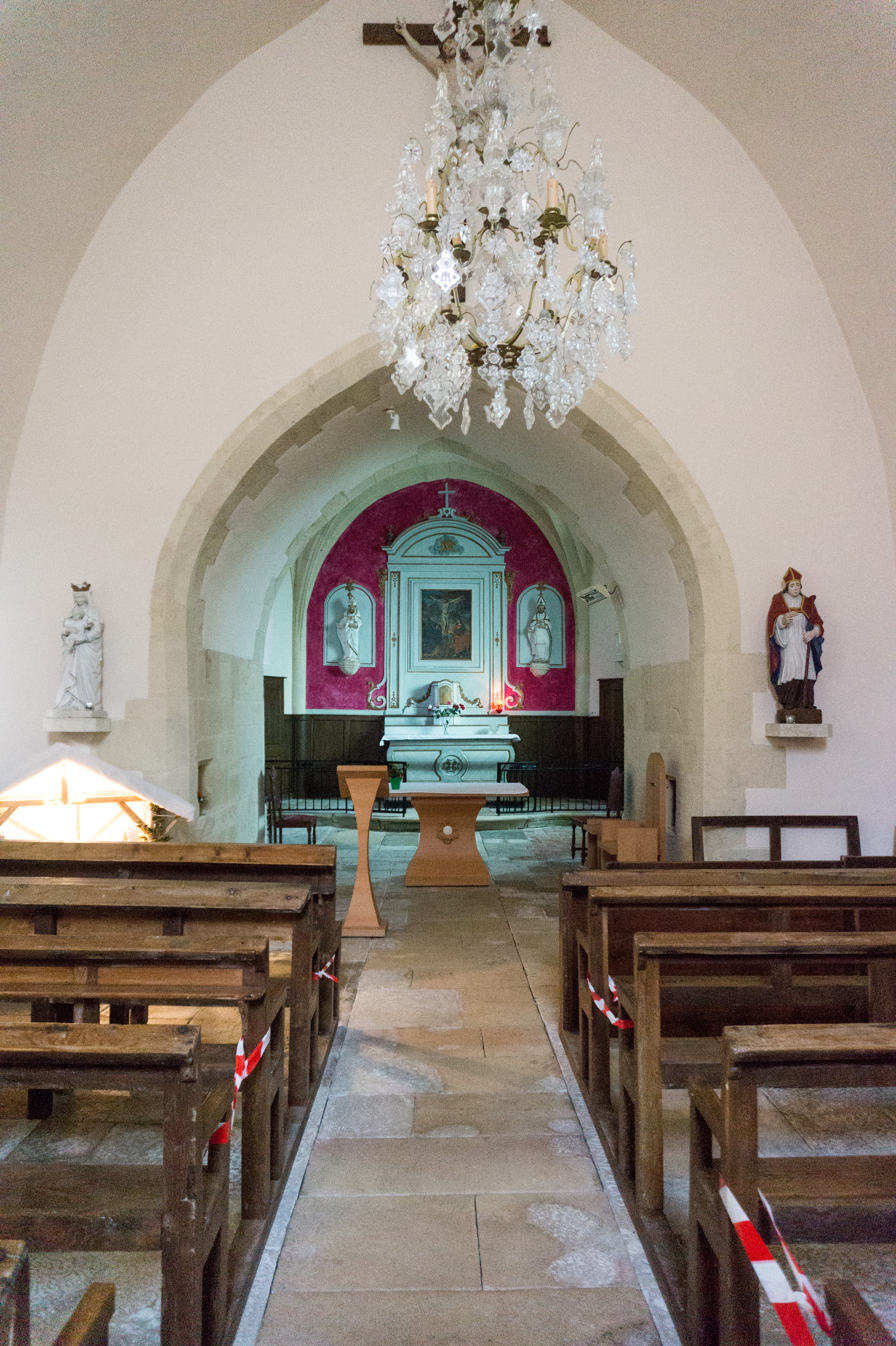
Inside the church

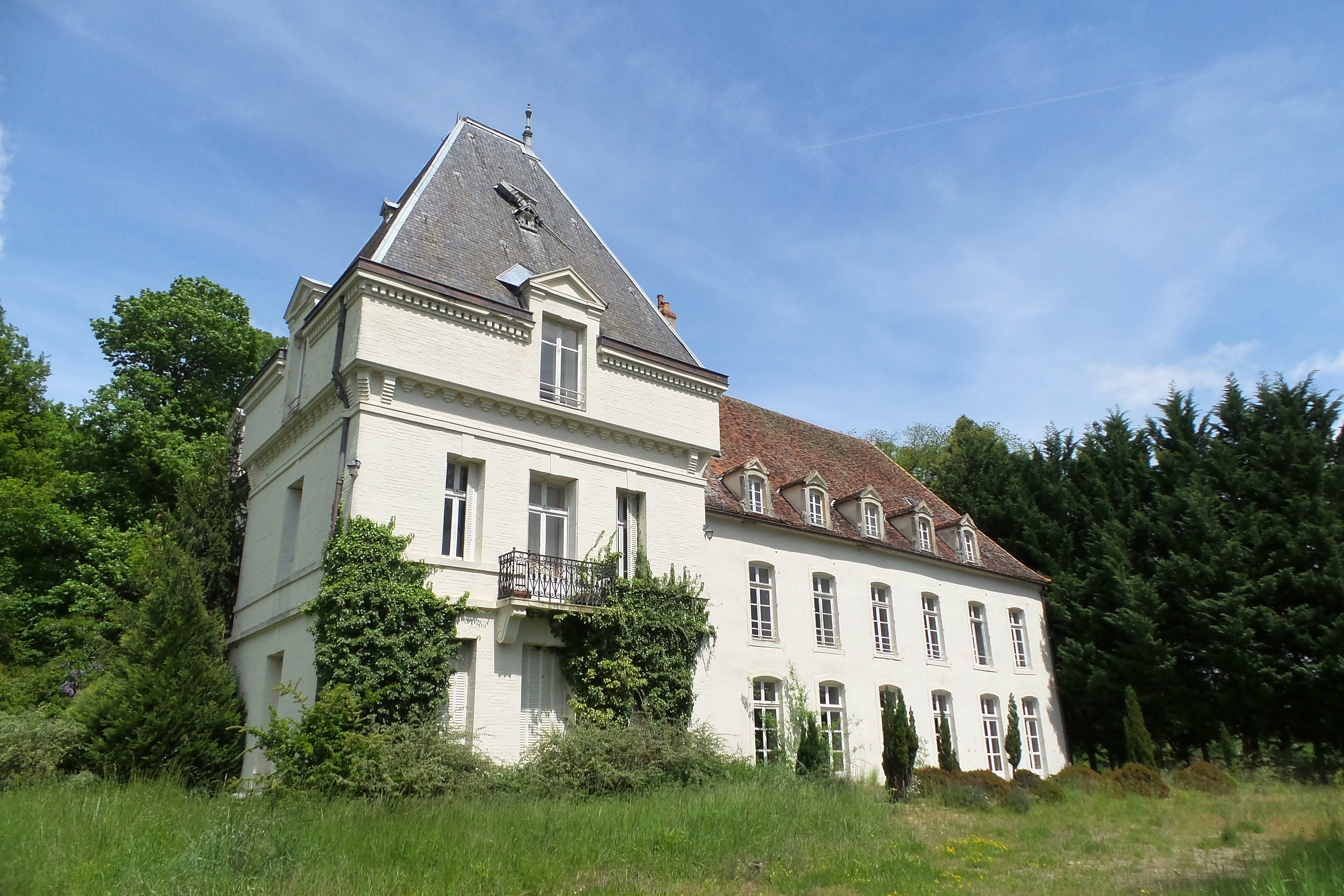
Château de Malaisy

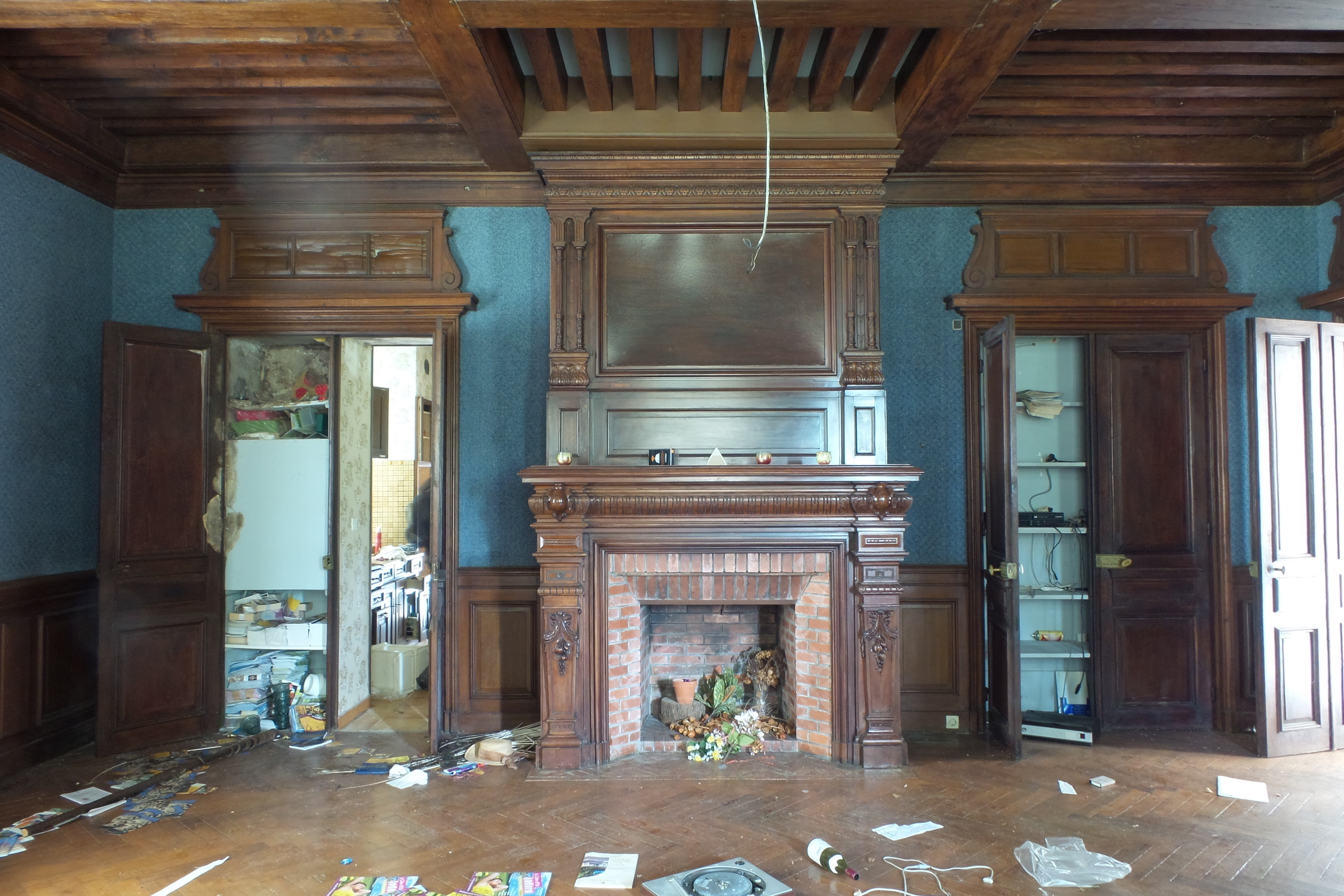
The sitting room of the château during its abandonment in 2016

== See also ==
- Communes of the Côte-d'Or department
