= Mohammad Jan Fana =

Mohammad Jan Fana Safi (born 25 June 1932) is a poet, writer, and artist. He was commonly known as Mohammad Jan Fana. Born in northern Afghanistan, he lived in Afghanistan's capital, Kabul, for most of his life.

== Personal life ==
He was married and had six children, three boys and three girls, who all lived in Kabul, Afghanistan but moved to the United States after Major Fana's death.

He played a number of musical instruments such as the mandolin, harmonium and accordion.

== Writings and Artwork ==
=== Poetry and Writing ===
Mohammad Jan Fana Safi has 13 published books and has written countless poems. He wrote poetry in three languages: Pashto, Dari, and English.

=== Artwork ===
Mohammad Jan Fana Safi has had many of his illustrations published in newspapers and magazines.
