= Lisa Fain =

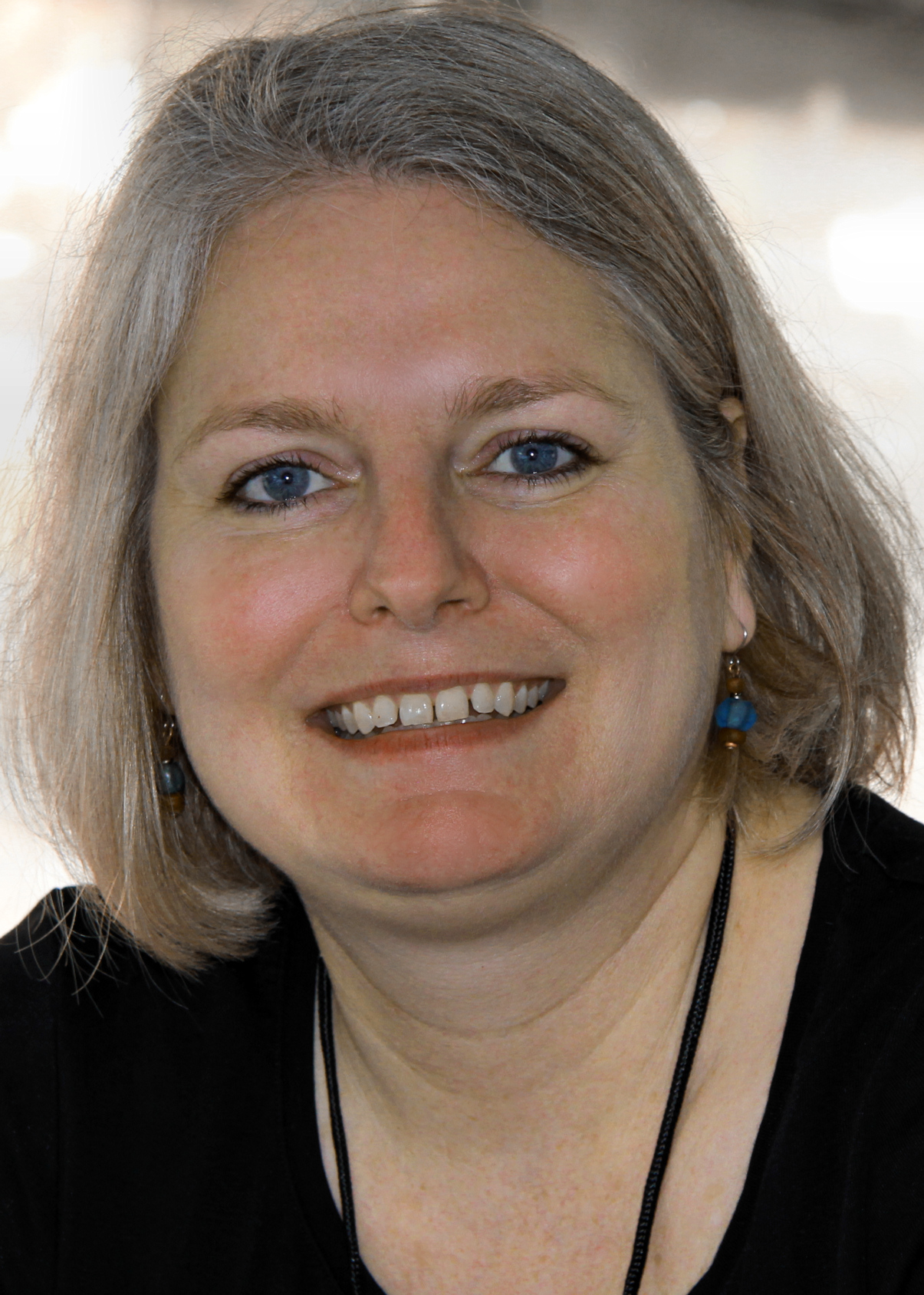
- Lisa Fain at the 2014 Texas Book Festival.
- Born: Houston, Texas, U.S.
- Occupation: Food Writer

Lisa Fain is an American food writer and blogger who grew up outside of Houston, Texas, is known as the Homesick Texan and is a writer of two cookbooks. She is the winner of the 2014 James Beard Foundation award for Best Individual Food Blog.
