= Phana district =

Phana พนา
- District
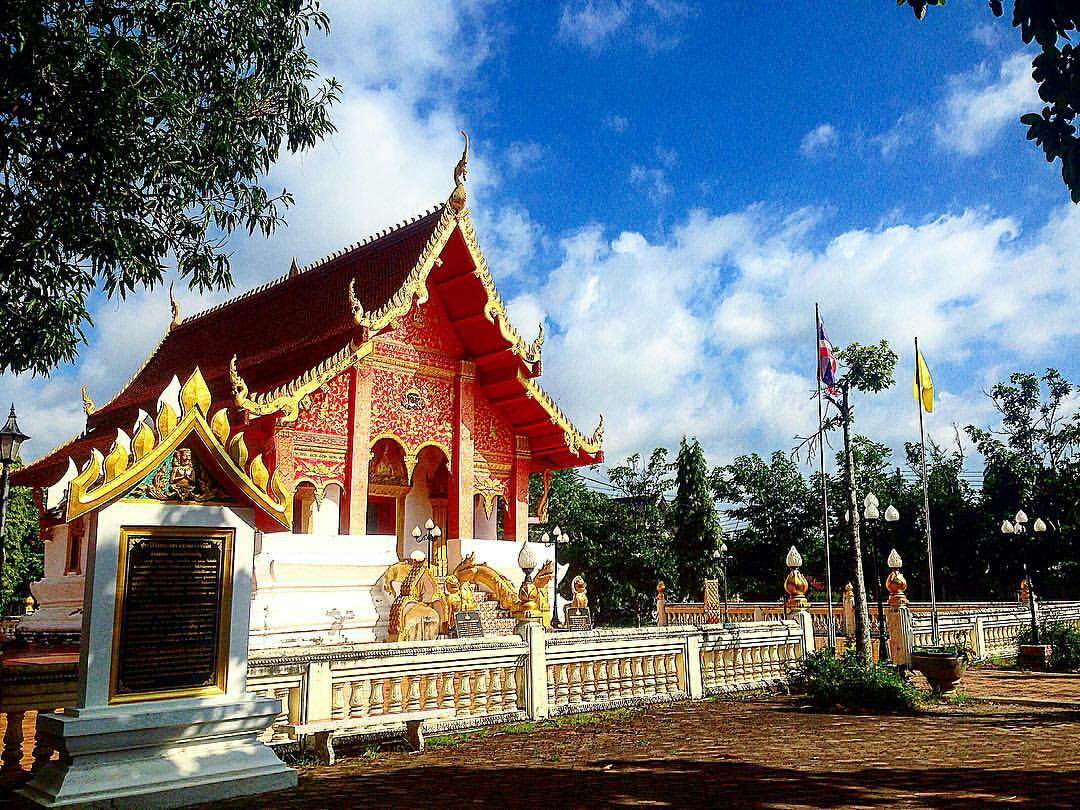
- Wat Phra Lao Thep Nimit

- District location in Amnat Charoen province
- Coordinates: 15°41′0″N 104°50′48″E
- Country: Thailand
- Province: Amnat Charoen
- Subdistricts: 4
- Mubans: 56
- District established: 1950

Area
  - Total: 235.0 km^{2} (90.7 sq mi)

Population (2010)
  - Total: 28,001
  - Density: 216.2/km^{2} (560/sq mi)
- Time zone: UTC+7 (ICT)
- Postal code: 37180
- Geocode: 3704

Phana (Thai: พนา, pronounced [pʰā.nāː]; Northeastern Thai: พนา, pronounced [pʰā.nâː]) is a district (amphoe) of Amnat Charoen province, northeastern Thailand.

== History ==
The district goes back to Mueang Phana Nikhom (พนานิคม), which was a subordinate of Mueang Ubon Ratchathani. It was converted into a district in 1914. The district office was in Ban Khulu, which is now in Trakan Phuet Phon district. On 1 December 1951 the western part of the district was split off as the minor district (king amphoe) Phana. It was upgraded to a full district on 22 July 1959. In 1993 it was one of the districts which formed the new province, Amnat Charoen.

== Geography ==
Neighboring districts are (from the west clockwise): Lue Amnat, Mueang Amnat Charoen, and Pathum Ratchawongsa of Amnat Charoen Province; and Trakan Phuet Phon, Lao Suea Kok, and Muang Sam Sip of Ubon Ratchathani province.

== Administration ==
The district is divided into four sub-districts (tambons), which are further subdivided into 56 villages (mubans). There are two sub-district municipalities (thesaban tambons). Phra Lao covers parts of tambon Phra Lao, and Phana covers further parts of tambon Phra Lao and parts of tambon Phana. There are a further three tambon administrative organizations (TAO).

No.	Name	Thai	Villages	Pop.
1.	Phana	พนา	11	4,856
2.	Chan Lan	จานลาน	18	8,535
3.	Mai Klon	ไม้กลอน	16	7,461
4.	Phra Lao	พระเหลา	11	7,149
