= Frozan Fana =

Afghan politician (born 1969)

- Born: 1969 (age 56–57); Herat, Afghanistan
- Education: Kabul University
- Occupation: Orthopaedic surgeon
- Known for: Candidate for President of Afghanistan in 2009
- Spouse: Abdul Rahman (before 2002)

Frozan Fana (born 1969) is an Afghan orthopaedic surgeon and former candidate in the 2009 Afghan presidential election.

== Early life ==
Fana was born in Herat in 1969. She attended Amina Fadawi High School and graduated from Kabul University.

== Political career ==
Fana was an independent candidate for the 2009 Afghan presidential election, with Mohammad Nasim Darmand as her running mate, after the Salam Watandar Radio Network raised the issue of a lack of female candidates. She campaigned against corruption, alleging that political rivals had assassinated her late husband for being a "dove of peace" who campaigned on reform policies.

During her campaign, Fana voiced difficulties campaigning, being ignored by a police chief in Jalalabad and lacking security personnel, forcing most of her campaign to revolve around inviting journalists and supporters to her home. Conservatives would also criticize Fana for using her own photograph in her campaign posters.

The 2009 election concluded with Fana receiving 21,512 votes, placing 7th in a field of 32 candidates.

== Personal life ==
Fana was married to aviation and tourism minister Abdul Rahman, who was assassinated in 2002. They had a son, who drowned in Salang, Parwan in 2005, and a daughter named Mehria.
