= Amnat Charoen province =

Province of Thailand

Coordinates: 15°54′5″N 104°37′22″E

Amnat Charoen อำนาจเจริญ
- Province
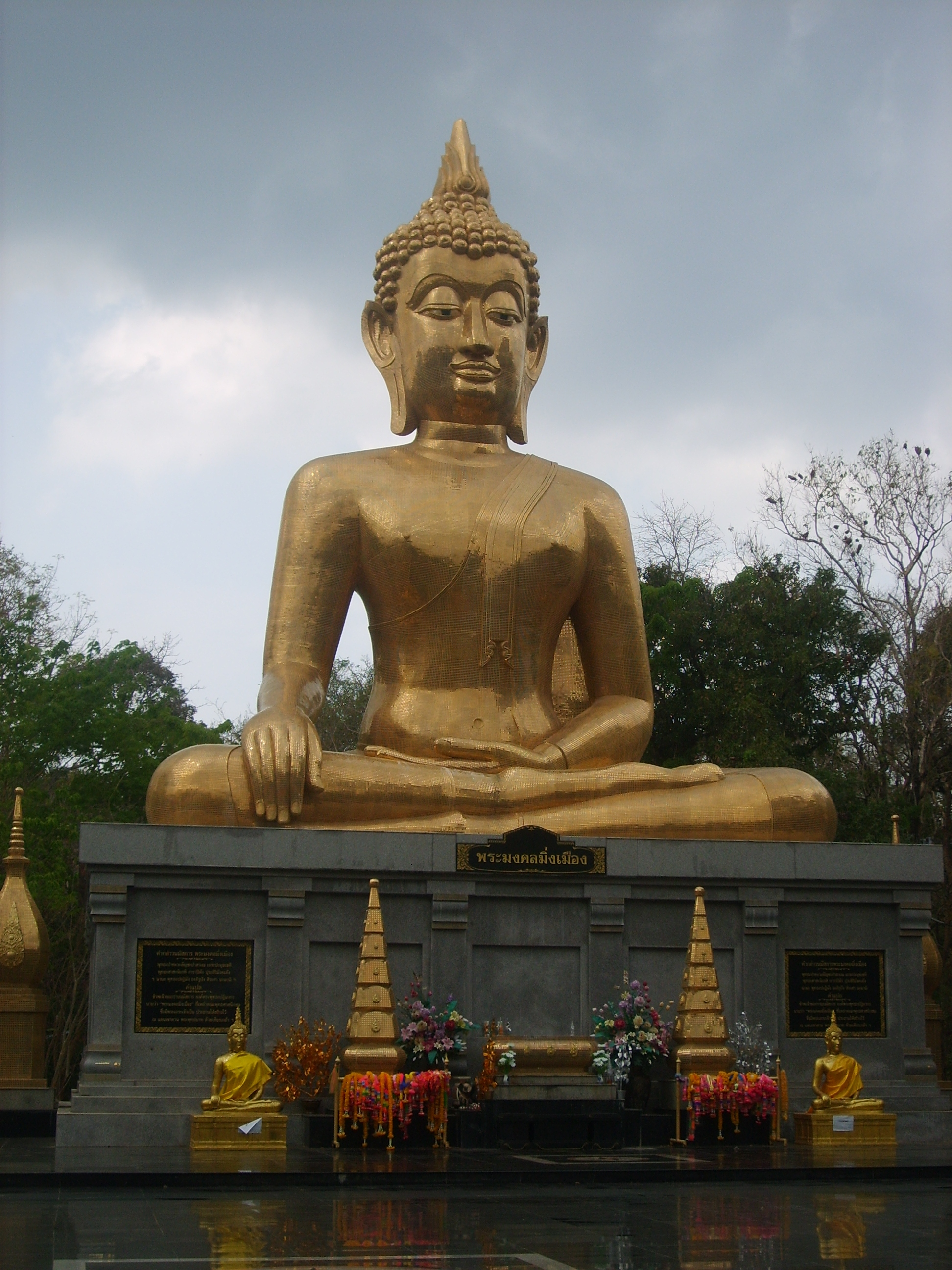
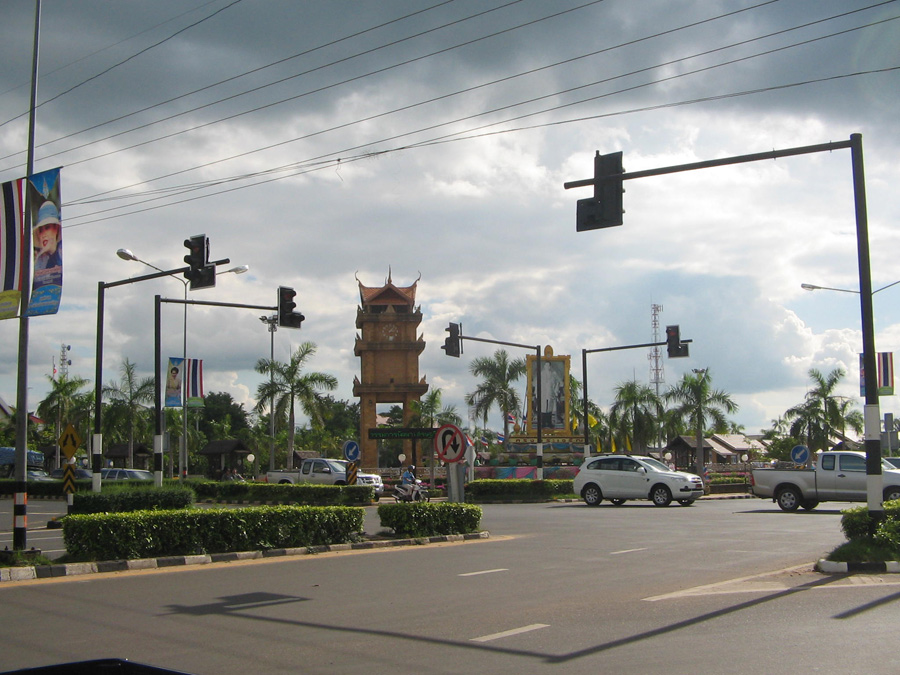
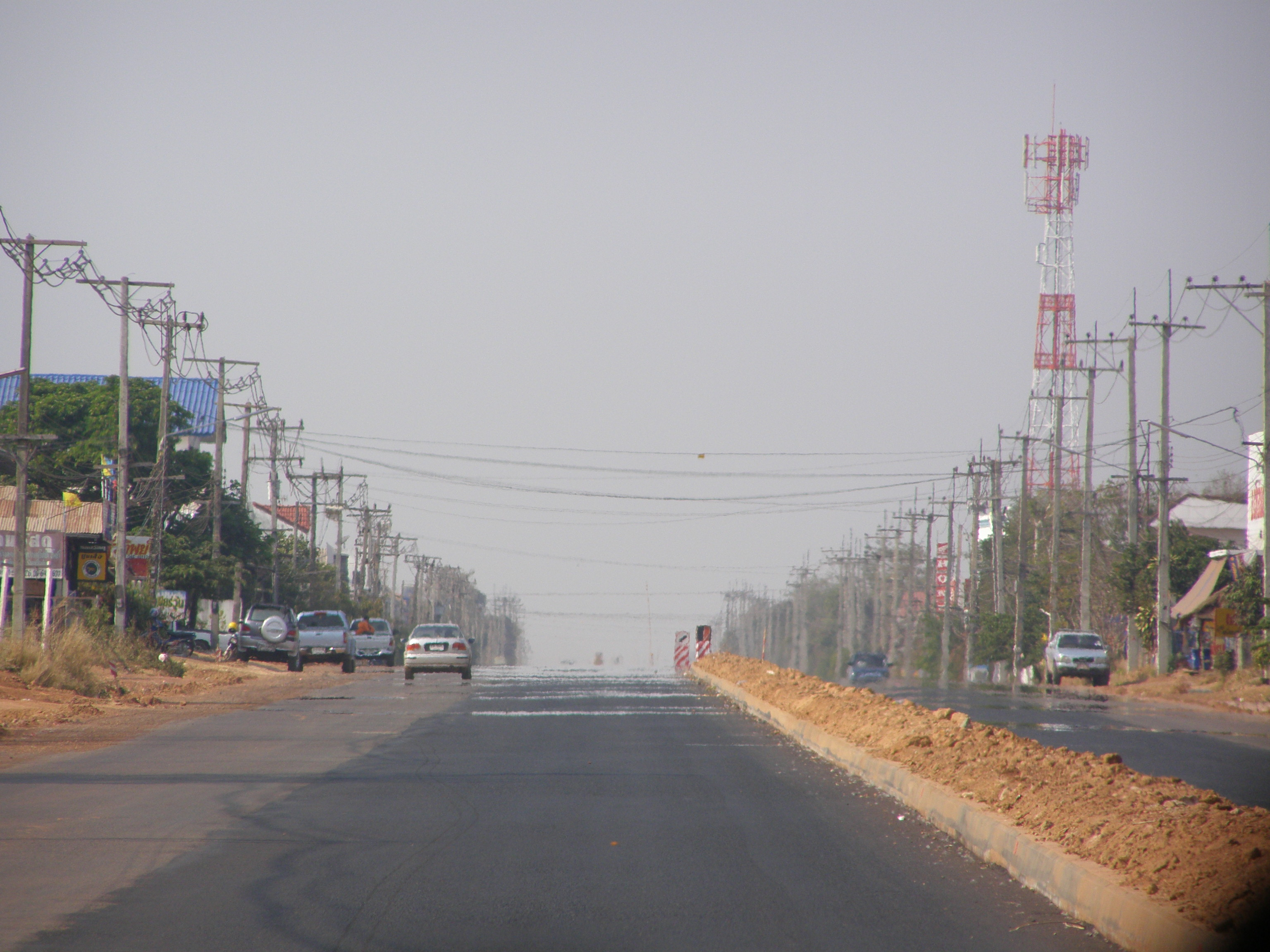
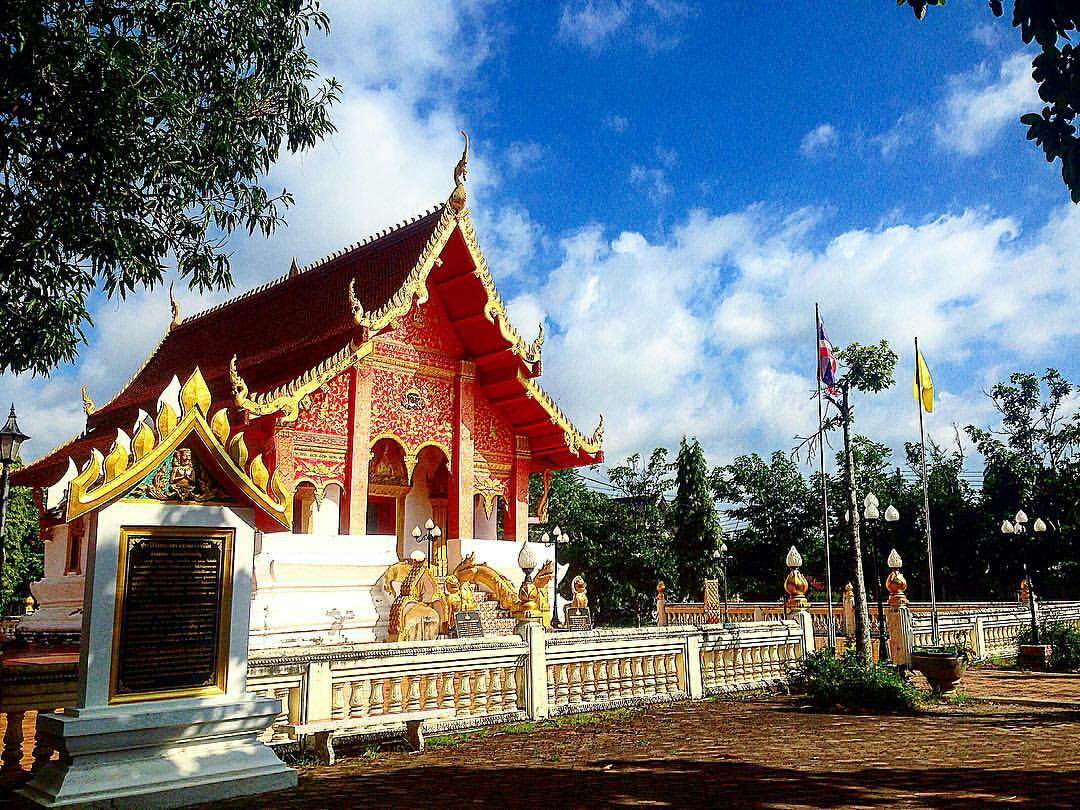
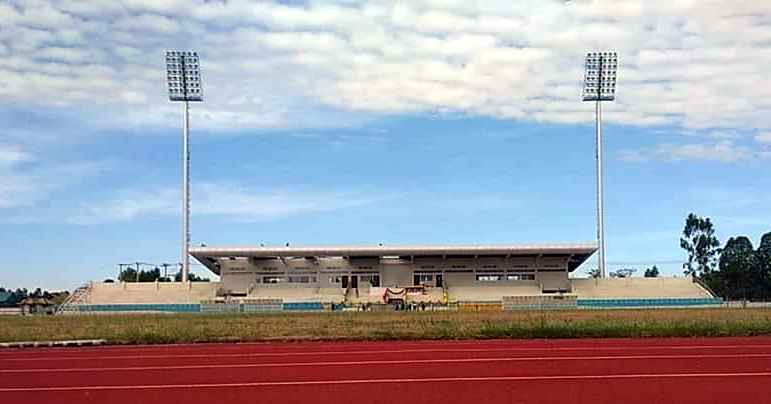
- From top left: Phra Mongkol Ming Mueang; Intersection in 2014; Road between Amnat Charoen and Mukdahan; Wat Phra Lao Thep Nimit; Amnat Charoen Province Stadium

- Flag Seal
- Mottoes: พระมงคลมิ่งเมือง แหล่งรุ่งเรืองเจ็ดลุ่มน้ำ งามล้ำถ้ำศักดิ์สิทธิ์ เทพนิมิตพระเหลา เกาะแก่งเขาแสนสวย เลอค่าด้วยผ้าไหม ราษฎร์เลื่อมใสใฝ่ธรรม ("Phra Mongkhon Ming Mueang. The source of seven great streams. Beautiful, sacred caves. Holy Buddha amulets, Beautiful rapids and mountains. Precious silk. Righteous people believing in Dharma.")
- Map of Thailand highlighting Amnat Charoen province
- Country: Thailand
- Capital: Amnat Charoen

Government
  - Type: Province and Provincial Administrative Organization
  - Body: Amnat Charoen Province and Amnat Charoen Provincial Administrative Organization
  - Governor: Seni Somkhiaowan
  - PAO Chief Executive: Panat Phanwan

Area
  - Total: 3,290 km^{2} (1,270 sq mi)
  - Rank: 59th

Population (2024)
  - Total: ▼372,183
  - Rank: 65th
  - Density: 113/km^{2} (290/sq mi)
  - Rank: 43rd

Human Achievement Index
  - HAI (2022): 0.6549 "somewhat high" Ranked 20th

GDP
  - Total: baht 18 billion (US$0.6 billion) (2019)
- Time zone: UTC+7 (ICT)
- Postal code: 37xxx
- Calling code: 045
- ISO 3166 code: TH-37
- Website: amnatcharoen.go.th amnatpao.go.th

Amnat Charoen (Thai: อำนาจเจริญ, pronounced [ʔām.nâːt tɕā.rɤ̄ːn]; Northeastern Thai: อำนาจเจริญ, pronounced [ʔàm.nâːt tɕā.lɤ̂ːn]) is one of Thailand's seventy-six provinces (changwat) and lies central northeastern Thailand, also called Isan. Neighbouring provinces are (clockwise from the south) Ubon Ratchathani, Yasothon, and Mukdahan. To the east it borders Savannakhet of Laos. Its name is a concatenation of อำนาจ ("authority, power") and เจริญ ("prosperous").

== Geography ==
The province is in the Mekong valley. In dry season, from February to May, water in Mekong River declines, and allows islands to appear. Islands include Kaeng Tanglang at Si Sombun Village, close to Amphoe Chanuman, and Kaeng Hin Khan at Ban Hin Khan, 30 kilometres south of Amphoe Chanuman. The other two rivers in the province are the Lam Sae Bok and Lam Sae Bai. The total forest area is 314 km^{2} (121 sq mi) or 9.5 percent of provincial area.

=== National Park ===
There is one national park, along with five other national parks, make up region 9 (Ubon Ratchathani) of Thailand's protected areas. (Visitors in fiscal year 2024)

Phu Sa Dok Bua National Park	231 km^{2} (89 sq mi)	(8,840)

== History ==
Amnat Charoen gained city status during the reign of King Rama III. It was first administered from Nakhon Khemarat, and later from Ubon Ratchathani. It became a province in its own right on 12 January 1993, when it was split off from Ubon Ratchathani. It is thus one of the four newest provinces of Thailand, together with Nong Bua Lam Phu and Sa Kaeo, both also established in 1993, and Bueng Kan, established in 2011.

== Economy ==
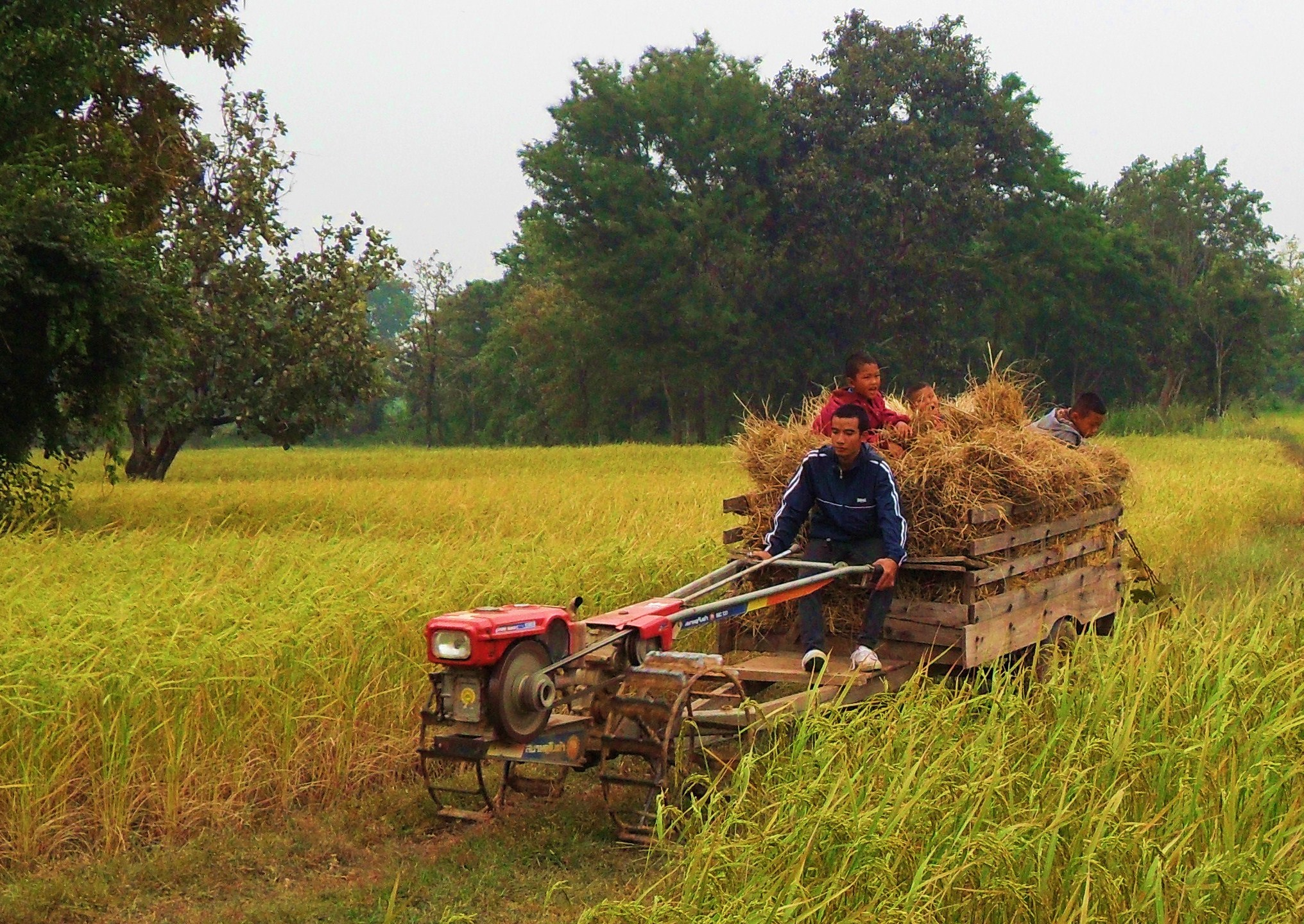
Harvesting at Non Ngam village, Pathum Ratchawongsa District

The province is overwhelmingly agricultural. In 2008, Amnat Charoen locals developed the so-called "Dhamma agriculture" model based on self-governance and aimed at making the province a hub for organic farming. According to the Office of Agriculture Economics, Amnat Charoen in 2016 had a total of 883,499 rai planted in hom Mali rice. Sugarcane plantations increased from 40,688 rai in 2015 to 51,446 rai in 2016.

=== Local Industries ===
In the Lue Amnat District the industries include Silk (ikat fabric), Khid fabric, Products processed from sedge mats, fish sauce, chili paste, and botanical arts. In the Mueang District the local industries include dried meat, fermented pork with star gooseberry leaves (Somporn Shop), Herbal Jaew Bong, Jasmin germinated brown rice, organic jasmine rice, Jasmine rice 3K, Mulberry Tea, Wood carvings, Sedge mats (khit pattern), Silky mats, Bananas wrapped in sesame seeds, Naturally dyed cotton, Plain fabric, Silk Shawl, Turtle scale pattern fabric, silk marbles, and steamed sticky rice boxing from Na Chik sub-district. Some local industries in the Phang district include, rain cloth, tie-die cloth, khit pattern cloth, sarong, silk fabric, and processed silk. In the Chanuman District some local industries include Dried Bananas from Ban Hin Khan, White towels with a woven edge, woven fabric, and Tamarind facial cleansers. In the Pathumratchawongsa District some local industries include Jasmine rice, Khat-ikat-mi-khit fabric, and the Ban Hin Kaeng Herbal Processing Group (Black Galingale Distilled Liquor). In the Senangkhanikhom District the local industry is sesame oil balm. In the Huataphan District the local industry is Ban Kham Phra woven fabric handicrafts.

== Symbols ==
In the middle of the provincial seal is an image of the Buddha called Phra Mongkol Ming Muang. Also known as Phra Yai (Big Buddha), this 20 m high statue is among the most sacred in the city of Amnat Charoen.

The provincial tree is Hopea ferrea. The provincial aquatic life is the Siamese mud carp (Henicorhynchus siamensis).

The provincial slogan is "Phra Mongkhon, seven river basins, sacred caves, Phra Lao, beautiful islands and mountain, precious silk and religious people".

== Administrative divisions ==
Districts of Amnat Charoen

=== Provincial government ===
The province is divided into seven districts (amphoe). The districts are further divided into 56 subdistricts (tambon) and 653 villages (muban).

1. Mueang Amnat Charoen
2. Chanuman
3. Pathum Ratchawongsa
4. Phana
5. Senangkhanikhom
6. Hua Taphan
7. Lue Amnat

=== Local government ===
As of 26 November 2019, there are: one Amnat Charoen Provincial Administration Organization (ongkan borihan suan changwat) and 24 municipal (thesaban) areas in the province. Amnat Charoen has town (thesaban mueang) status. Further 23 subdistrict municipalities (thesaban tambon).The non-municipal areas are administered by 39 Subdistrict Administrative Organisations - SAO (ongkan borihan suan tambon).

== Human achievement index 2022 ==
Health	Education	Employment	Income
59	48	25	65
Housing	Family	Transport	Participation
19	14	31	17
Province Amnat Charoen, with an HAI 2022 value of 0.6549 is "somewhat high", occupies place 20 in the ranking.

Since 2003, United Nations Development Programme (UNDP) in Thailand has tracked progress on human development at sub-national level using the human achievement index (HAI), a composite index covering all the eight key areas of human development. National Economic and Social Development Board (NESDB) has taken over this task since 2017.

Rank	Classification
1 - 13	"high"
14 - 29	"somewhat high"
30 - 45	"average"
46 - 61	"somewhat low"
62 - 77	"low"

Map with provinces and HAI 2022 rankings

== See also ==
- Khit cloth
