= Pravarasena =

Local ruler mentioned in a 7th-century Sanskrit inscription

Pravaraṣeṇa (also called Śrīmān Pravaraṣeṇa) was a ruler mentioned in the Don Mueang Toei inscription (K.1082). The inscription was found in Kham Khuean Kaeo district, Yasothon province, Thailand, in 1983. It is written in Sanskrit using the Pallava script and dates to around the 7th century CE.

The inscription describes Pravaraṣeṇa as the ruler of Śaṅkhapura. It also mentions Kroñcavāhu and the construction of a lingam for the worship of Shiva. The location of Śaṅkhapura is uncertain. Some scholars have suggested that it may have been at Don Mueang Toei.
