= Yasothon (disambiguation) =

Yasothon may refer to

- Yasothon town in Thailand
- Yasothon province
- Mueang Yasothon district

For Yasothon soils, see the geology of Khorat plateau

== See also ==
- Yaśodharā, wife of Gautama Buddha
