= Loeng Nok Tha district =

Loeng Nok Tha เลิงนกทา
- District
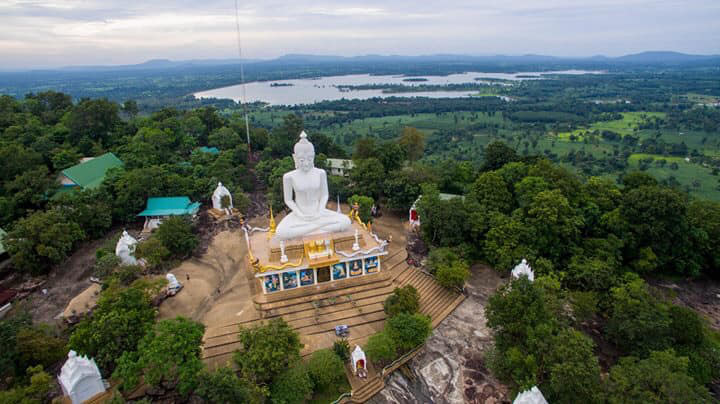
- Phu Sung Buddhist Park

- District location in Yasothon province
- Coordinates: 16°12′28″N 104°33′17″E
- Country: Thailand
- Province: Yasothon

Area
  - Total: 942.8 km^{2} (364.0 sq mi)

Population (2005)
  - Total: 93,750
  - Density: 99.4/km^{2} (257/sq mi)
- Time zone: UTC+7 (ICT)
- Postal code: 35120
- Geocode: 3508

Loeng Nok Tha (Thai: เลิงนกทา, pronounced [lɤ̄ːŋ nók tʰāː]; Northeastern Thai: เลิงนกทา, pronounced [lɤ̂ːŋ nòk tʰâː]) is a district of Yasothon province in northeastern Thailand. Loeng Nok Tha town, the administrative center of the district, lies 69 km from Mueang Yasothon, and approximately 600 km from Bangkok.

== History ==
Loeng Nok Tha was established as a minor district (king amphoe), under jurisdiction of Mueang Amnat Charoen district in Ubon Ratchathani province on 1 September 1937. It then consisted of the three tambons Kut Chiang Mi, Bung Kha, and Som Pho.

On 1 November 1947, Loeng Nok Tha was elevated to district (amphoe) status in Ubon Ratchathani Province. When Yasothon was established as a province in 1972, Loeng Nok Tha was one of six districts reassigned to the new province.

== Etymology ==
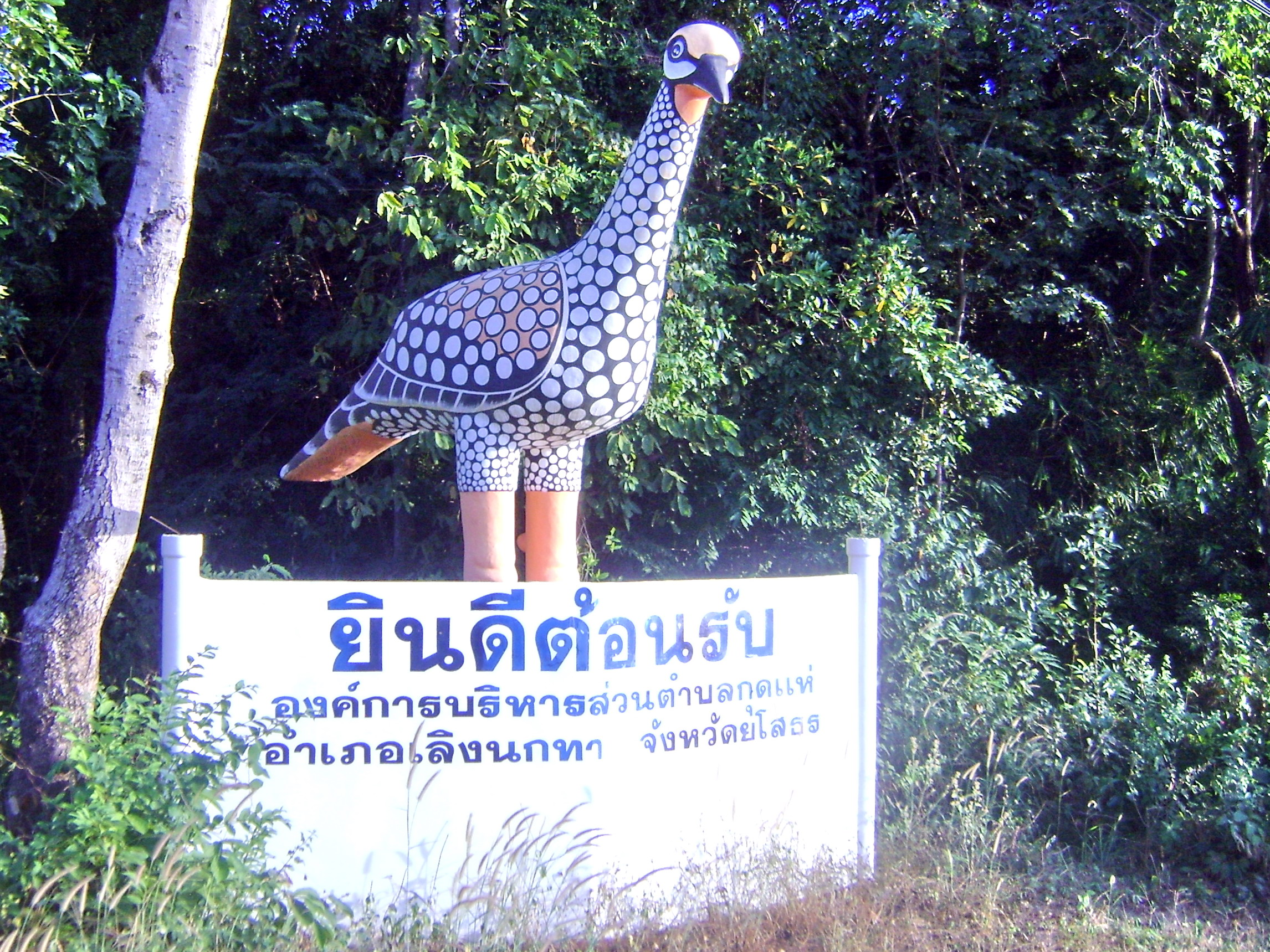
Nok Tha

The name Loeng Nok Tha consists of two parts:

Loeng, Isan for a 'low-lying swampy basin'.
Nok (fowl) Tha (painted), Isan for a species of bird similar to the guineafowl.

The area of Loeng Nok Tha is so called because there once were large numbers of nok tha living around the swamps of the region, but they have now disappeared almost entirely as a result of human habitation; not to be confused with similarly named Tambon Nong ('fen') Nok Tha (Thai: หนองนกทา) in Khemarat district, Ubon Ratchatani Province; or None ('hill') Nok Tha (Thai:โนนนกทา) a Thai prehistoric archaeological site in Phu Wiang district, Khon Kaen Province.

== Geography ==
Neighboring districts are (from the north clockwise) Nong Sung, Nikhom Kham Soi, and Don Tan of Mukdahan province; Chanuman and Senangkhanikhom of Amnat Charoen province; Thai Charoen and Kut Chum of Yasothon Province; and Nong Phok of Roi Et province.

== Administration ==
The district is divided into 10 sub-districts (tambons), incorporating 143 villages (mubans).

1. Bung Kha (บุ่งค้า)
2. Sawat (สวาท)
3. Hong Saeng (ห้องแซง)
4. Sammakkhi (สามัคคี)
5. Kut Chiang Mi (กุดเชียงหมี)
6. Sam Yaek (สามแยก)
7. Kut Hae (กุดแห่)
8. Khok Samran (โคกสำราญ)
9. Sang Ming (สร้างมิ่ง)
10. Si Kaeo (ศรีแก้ว)

== Education ==
=== Secondary schools ===
- Loeng Nok Tha School (โรงเรียนเลิงนกทา)
- Hong Saeng Witthayakhom School (โรงเรียนห้องแซงวิทยาคม)
- Bung Kha Witthayakhom School (โรงเรียนบุ่งค้าวิทยาคม)
- Si Kaeo Pracha San School (โรงเรียนศรีแก้วประชาสรรค์)
- Na Prong Pracha San School (โรงเรียนนาโปร่งประชาสรรค์)

=== Colleges ===
- Loeng Nok Tha College (วิทยาลัยการอาชีพเลิงนกทา)
