= Amnat Charoen (disambiguation) =

Amnat Charoen may refer to these places in Thailand:

- Amnat Charoen, a town
- Amnat Charoen Province
- Mueang Amnat Charoen district
