= Hong Saeng =

Hong Saeng ห้องแซง
- Tambon
- Location in Thailand
- Coordinates: 16°16′16.9″N 104°24′23.1″E
- Country: Thailand
- Province: Yasothon
- Amphoe: Loeng Nok Tha

Population (2018)
  - Total: 11,485
- Time zone: UTC+7 (TST)
- Postal code: 35120
- TIS 1099: 350805

Hong Saeng (Thai: ห้องแซง, pronounced [hɔ̂ŋ sɛ̄ːŋ]; Northeastern Thai: ห้องแซง, pronounced [hɔ̀ŋ sɛ̂ːŋ]) is a tambon (subdistrict) of Loeng Nok Tha District, Yasothon Province, Isan region (northeastern Thailand). As of 2018, the total population was 11,485 people.

== History ==
Hong Saeng has long been a secure home for the Phu Thai ethnic group. Their ancestors emigrated from Xépôn in Laos starting 1849–1850.

Originally, the area was called "Dong Pa Hong Ya Saeng" (ดงป่าฮ่องย่าแสง), which evolved into the present-day name "Hong Saeng".

== Geography ==
Hong Saeng is considered an area near the border of three provinces: Yasothon, Roi Et, and Amnat Charoen. Most of the area consists of lowlands in the central and western parts.

Neighboring tambons are (from the north clockwise): Kut Chiang Mi, Samakkhi, Si Kaeo, and Pha Nam Yoi of Nong Phok District, Roi Et Province.

== Economy ==
Most residents of Hong Saeng work in agriculture.

== Administration ==
=== Central administration ===
The tambon is subdivided into 19 administrative villages (muban).

| No. | Name | Thai |
|---|---|---|
| 1. | Ban Hong Saeng | บ้านห้องแซง |
| 2. | Ban Phong | บ้านโพง |
| 3. | Ban Hong Khlong | บ้านห้องคลอง |
| 4. | Ban Nong Bueng | บ้านหนองบึง |
| 5. | Ban Hong Saeng | บ้านห้องแซง |
| 6. | Ban Tha Sila | บ้านท่าศิลา |
| 7. | Ban Dong Yang | บ้านดงยาง |
| 8. | Ban Non Daeng | บ้านโนนแดง |
| 9. | Ban Pa Chat | บ้านป่าชาด |
| 10. | Ban Sok Sam | บ้านโสกสาน |
| 11. | Ban Hong Saeng Tai | บ้านห้องแซงใต้ |
| 12. | Ban Pho Thong | บ้านโพธิ์ทอง |
| 13. | Ban Nong Tio | บ้านหนองติ้ว |
| 14. | Ban Rong Kham | บ้านร่องคำ |
| 15. | Ban Phong | บ้านโพง |
| 16. | Ban Dong Yang | บ้านดงยาง |
| 17. | Ban Nong Saeng | บ้านหนองแซง |
| 18. | Ban Hong Saeng | บ้านห้องแซง |
| 19. | Ban Na Wa | บ้านนาหว้า |

=== Local administration ===
The whole area of the subdistrict is covered by the subdistrict municipality (Thesaban Tambon) Hong Saeng (เทศบาลตำบลห้องแซง).

== Local products ==
- Indigo woven clothing
- Kratip (bamboo container for holding cooked glutinous rice)
