= Dao Mayuree =

Thai singer

- ดาว มยุรี
- Born: Mayuree Pannam (Thai: มยุรี พันธุ์นาม); 24 September 1969 (age 56); Senangkhanikhom, Ubon Ratchathani Province (modern-day Amnat Charoen Province), Thailand
- Occupation: Singer
- Musical career
- Genres: Luk thung, Pop
- Years active: 1992–present
- Label: R-Siam

Dao Mayuree (Thai: ดาว มยุรี, RTGS: Dao Mayuri; born 24 September 1969) is a female Thai singer.

== Early life ==
Dao Mayuree's birthname is Mayuree Pannam (Thai: มยุรี พันธุ์นาม). She was born on 24 September 1969, and is daughter to Sombun-Sawei Pannam.

=== Career ===
She started her entertainment career on stage in 1992, with encouragement from Kitthisak Sainamthip and Prakot Chimson. She recorded her first album Hai Man Lueang Khao Wai, but her sixth studio album Mee Miea Laeaw Mai Aao made her very popular. Other popular music includes "Mi Na La", "Sao Paeng Loei", etc.

=== Family life ===
She married Manoon Pimpathong and has a daughter. However she said in a 2015 interview that she was a partner of Bim See-Four, another well-known female singer.

== Discography ==
=== Albums ===
- "Hai Ma Lueang Khao Wai" ให้มันเหลืองเข้าไว้
- "Rak Thee Thao Rai" รักที่เท่าไหร่
- "Wasana Khon Heng" วาสนาคนเฮง
- "Super Heng" ซูเปอร์เฮง
- "Oak Hak Dee Kwa" อกหักดีกว่า
- "Mee Miea Laeaw Mai Aao" มีเมียแล้วไม่เอา
- "Fan Thong" ฟันธง
- "Dao Ma Laeaw Ja" ดาวมาแล้วจ้า
- "Fak Kwam Kid Thueng" ฝากความคิดถึง
