= Hua Taphan district =

Hua Taphan หัวตะพาน
- District
- District location in Amnat Charoen province
- Coordinates: 15°41′48″N 104°29′30″E
- Country: Thailand
- Province: Amnat Charoen
- Seat: Rattanawari

Area
  - Total: 533.0 km^{2} (205.8 sq mi)

Population (2005)
  - Total: 50,524
  - Density: 94.8/km^{2} (246/sq mi)
- Time zone: UTC+7 (ICT)
- Postal code: 37240
- Geocode: 3706

Hua Taphan (Thai: หัวตะพาน, pronounced [hǔa tā.pʰāːn]; Northeastern Thai: หัวตะพาน, pronounced [hǔa tā.pʰâːn]) is a district (amphoe) of Amnat Charoen province, northeastern Thailand.

== History ==
The minor district (King Amphoe) was established on 15 August 1967, when four tambon,: Hua Taphan, Kham Phra, Nong Kaeo, and Kheng Yai, were split off from Mueang Amnat Charoen district. It was upgraded to an entire district on 17 November 1971. In 1993, it was one of the districts which formed the new province, Amnat Charoen.

== Geography ==
Neighboring districts are (from the north clockwise): Mueang Amnat Charoen and Lue Amnat of Amnat Charoen Province; Muang Sam Sip and Khueang Nai of Ubon Ratchathani province; and Kham Khuean Kaeo and Pa Tio of Yasothon province.

== Administration ==
The district is divided into eight sub-districts (tambons), which are further subdivided into 85 villages (mubans). Hua Taphan is a township (thesaban tambon) which covers parts of tambons Hua Taphan, Nong Kaeo, and Rattanawari. There are a further seven tambon administrative organizations (TAO).

| No. | Name | Thai name | Villages | Pop. |
|---|---|---|---|---|
| 1. | Hua Taphan | หัวตะพาน | 9 | 6,220 |
| 2. | Kham Phra | คำพระ | 12 | 6,882 |
| 3. | Kheng Yai | เค็งใหญ่ | 10 | 6,186 |
| 4. | Nong Kaeo | หนองแก้ว | 10 | 4,396 |
| 5. | Phon Mueang Noi | โพนเมืองน้อย | 12 | 7,086 |
| 6. | Sang Tho Noi | สร้างถ่อน้อย | 13 | 8,111 |
| 7. | Chik Du | จิกดู่ | 12 | 7,019 |
| 8. | Rattanawari | รัตนวารี | 7 | 4,624 |
