= Buriram (disambiguation) =

Buriram may refer to these places in Thailand:

- Amnat Charoen, a town
- Buriram province
- Mueang Buriram district
- Buriram Subdistrict
