= Yang Chum Noi district =

Yang Chum Noi ยางชุมน้อย
- District
- District location in Sisaket province
- Coordinates: 15°15′42″N 104°24′4″E
- Country: Thailand
- Province: Sisaket
- Seat: Yang Chum Noi

Area
  - Total: 248.8 km^{2} (96.1 sq mi)

Population (2005)
  - Total: 36,991
  - Density: 191.2/km^{2} (495/sq mi)
- Time zone: UTC+7 (ICT)
- Postal code: 33190
- Geocode: 3302

Yang Chum Noi (Thai: ยางชุมน้อย, pronounced [jāːŋ t͡ɕʰūm nɔ́ːj]) is a district (amphoe) in the northern part of Sisaket province, northeastern Thailand.

== Geography ==
Neighboring districts are (from the east clockwise): Kanthararom, Mueang Sisaket, and Rasi Salai of Sisaket Province; Kho Wang of Yasothon province; and Khueang Nai of Ubon Ratchathani province.

== History ==
The minor district (king amphoe) Yang Chum Noi was established on 1 September 1971, when the three tambons, Yang Chum Noi, Khon Kam, and Lin Fa, were split off from Mueang Sisaket district. On 25 March 1979 it was upgraded to a full district.

== Administration ==
The district is divided into seven sub-districts (tambons), which are further subdivided into 86 villages (mubans). Yang Chum Noi is a township (thesaban tambon) which covers parts of tambon Yang Chum Noi. There are a further seven tambon administrative organizations (TAO).

No.	Name	Thai name	Villages	Pop.
1.	Yang Chum Noi	ยางชุมน้อย	10	6,119
2.	Lin Fa	ลิ้นฟ้า	19	6,236
3.	Khon Kam	คอนกาม	14	5,795
4.	Non Khun	โนนคูณ	14	6,654
5.	Kut Mueang Ham	กุดเมืองฮาม	8	3,310
6.	Bueng Bon	บึงบอน	13	5,725
7.	Yang Chum Yai	ยางชุมใหญ่	8	3,152
