= Khueang Nai district =

Khueang Nai เขื่องใน
- District
- District location in Ubon Ratchathani Province
- Coordinates: 15°23′22″N 104°33′5″E
- Country: Thailand
- Province: Ubon Ratchathani
- Seat: Khueang Nai

Area
  - Total: 772.8 km^{2} (298.4 sq mi)

Population (2005)
  - Total: 109,453
  - Density: 141.6/km^{2} (367/sq mi)
- Time zone: UTC+7 (ICT)
- Postal code: 34150
- Geocode: 3404

Khueang Nai (Thai: เขื่องใน, pronounced [kʰɯ̀aŋ nāj]; Northeastern Thai: เขื่องใน, pronounced [kʰɯ̄aŋ nâj]) is a district (amphoe) in the northwestern part of Ubon Ratchathani province, northeastern Thailand.

== Geography ==
Neighboring districts are (from the east clockwise): Muang Sam Sip, Mueang Ubon Ratchathani of Ubon Ratchathani Province, Kanthararom, Yang Chum Noi of Sisaket province, Kho Wang, Maha Chana Chai, Kham Khuean Kaeo of Yasothon province and Hua Taphan of Amnat Charoen province.

== History ==
Originally named Pachin Ubon (ปจิมอุบล, 'western Ubon'), in 1913 the district was renamed Trakan Phuet Phon (ตระการพืชผล). In 1917, the district was renamed Khueang Nai.

== Administration ==
The district is divided into 18 sub-districts (tambons), which are further subdivided into 180 villages (mubans). Khueang Nai is a sub-district municipality (thesaban tambon) which covers parts of tambon Khueang Nai. There are a further 18 tambon administrative organizations (TAO).

No.	Name	Thai	Villages	Pop.
1.	Khueang Nai	เขื่องใน	12	10,182
2.	Sang Tho	สร้างถ่อ	15	9,538
3.	Kho Thong	ค้อทอง	11	6,342
4.	Ko E	ก่อเอ้	12	7,410
5.	Hua Don	หัวดอน	11	6,399
6.	Chi Thuan	ชีทวน	11	6,594
7.	Tha Hai	ท่าไห	13	9,049
8.	Na Kham Yai	นาคำใหญ่	8	3,933
9.	Daeng Mo	แดงหม้อ	6	3,248
10.	That Noi	ธาตุน้อย	10	6,294
11.	Ban Thai	บ้านไทย	12	6,615
12.	Ban Kok	บ้านกอก	6	3,913
13.	Klang Yai	กลางใหญ่	11	5,619
14.	Non Rang	โนนรัง	7	4,449
15.	Yang Khi Nok	ยางขี้นก	10	4,816
16.	Si Suk	ศรีสุข	8	5,403
17.	Sahathat	สหธาตุ	7	3,056
18.	Nong Lao	หนองเหล่า	10	5,840
