= Sankhapura =

Ancient town mentioned in a Sanskrit inscription

Śaṅkhapura (Sanskrit: शङ्खपुर; Thai: ศังขปุระ) was an ancient town mentioned in the Don Mueang Toei inscription, found in Yasothon province, Thailand. The inscription names Pravarasena as its ruler. The exact location of Śaṅkhapura is uncertain.

== Inscription ==
The Don Mueang Toei inscription (K. 1082) was found in 1983 at the ancient settlement of Don Mueang Toei in Kham Khuean Kaeo district, Yasothon province. It is written in Sanskrit using the Pallava script and has four lines. The Princess Maha Chakri Sirindhorn Anthropology Centre dates it to around the seventh century, based on the form of its letters.

The inscription names Pravarasena as the ruler of Śaṅkhapura. It also mentions Kroñcavāhu and Dharmasena. According to the inscription, Dharmasena established a lingam dedicated to Shiva.

The inscription was initially misunderstood because four photographs of different parts of the stone were treated as four separate inscriptions. The photographs were later identified as parts of the same inscription, allowing the text to be read together.

== Location ==
Don Mueang Toei is an ancient settlement surrounded by a moat and earthen embankments. It is located approximately one kilometre from Ban Song Pueai in Kham Khuean Kaeo district.

Don Mueang Toei has been proposed as the location of Śaṅkhapura. However, archaeologist Pierre Pichard noted that the inscription does not explicitly identify the settlement where it was found as Śaṅkhapura.
