= St Michael's Church, Songyae =

- วัดอัครเทวดามีคาแอล ซ่งแย้
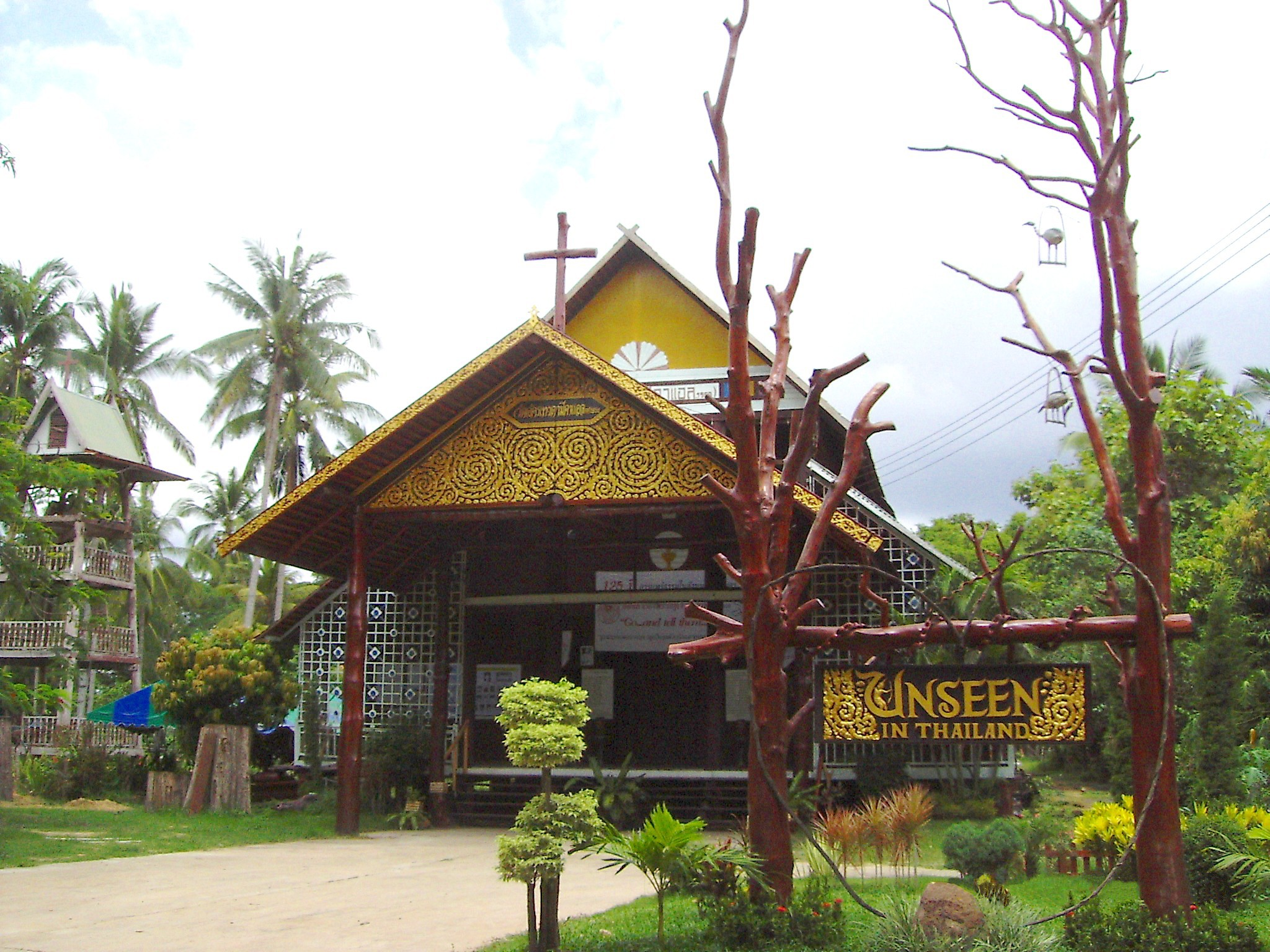
- St Michael Church, Songyae
- St Michael's Church, Songyae
- 16.067726°N 104.3802°E
- Location: Ban Nong Songyae, Kham Toei, Thai Charoen, Yasothon Province
- Country: Thailand
- Denomination: Roman Catholic
- Website: www.songyae.com

History
- Dedication: Michael (archangel)

Administration
- Diocese: Ubon Ratchathani
- Parish: St. Michael

St Michael's Church, Songyae (Thai: วัดอัครเทวดามีคาแอล ซ่งแย้; RTGS: Wat Akkhara Thewada Mikha-aeo Songyae) is a Roman Catholic parish church in the northeastern Thai village of Nong Songyae, Kham Toei Sub-district, Thai Charoen District, Yasothon Province

Nong (หนอง) indicates a fen; swampy or marshy land; Song (ซ่ง) is dialect for a group; yae (แย้) is the Beauty or Common Butterfly Lizard, Liolepis belliana.

== Background ==
According to the brochure published by the church, the Reverend Bishop Baye collected the history proper from congregational recollections, together with information from the Reverend Desaval's memoir. The first five families to settle in Ban Nong-Song-Yae arrived in 1908, some of them having been accused in their former homes of being possessed by ghosts. News of a Catholic priest in Ban-Sae-Song (บ้านเซซ่ง reached the villagers, and four of them met the Reverends Desaval and Ambrosio. The two began to taking turns making monthly visits, staying four or five days to teach the catholic faith. They soon asked that a temporary shelter be built for them, and in 1909 this shelter became the first chapel in Ban Nong-Song-Yae. In 1913 the village and congregation increased to fifteen families. In 1914 war between Germany and France resulted in about ten French missionaries being recalled to serve in the army. The reverend Gantang was left responsible for a large area, assisted by the Catechist Nai Siang Tan who was responsible for Ban Nong-Song-Yae. I By 1919 the congregation had increased to 400. A second church was built that was used for only three or four years before it proved too small. The third, built like a big terrace house with a wooden roof, bamboo walls, and six rooms, was located near Nong-Kai-Pig. Fire damaged four of the rooms, after which the congregation repaired and enlarged it, and located a priest's residence nearby.

== Resettlement ==
In 1925, some Catholics from Ban-Dong-Ma-Fai joined the community at Song-Yae. In 1933 – 34, six catholic families resettled in Ban-Phon-Sung in Udon Thani Province. In 1938, the reverend Degueir lead ten villagers to resettle at Ban-Khok-Khi-Nak, Nong Phok, Roi Et Province. In 1955 – 56 some families resettled in Ban San-Ti-Suk, Phetchabun Province. Some Song-Yae families moved a mere 10 kilometers to Ban Nong-Kae. As of 2006, there were about 200 Catholics in the community with a small chapel and St. Anthony, that remain under the pastoral care of the parish priest of St. Michael.

== Fourth construction ==
The Reverence Deguir's memoir says the villagers supplied the reverend Alazard with 60 cartloads of wood in 1936 for the construction of a new building, but the wood was confiscated by authorities. In 1947, under the direction of the reverence Montree, plans were laid for a church made of timber 57 meters long and 16 meters wide. The wooden, Thai-style church building was completed by skilled carpenters in 1953. On Sunday, 25 April 1954, the Reverend Bishop Chaudius Baye presided over and celebrated the inauguration and consecration of the fourth wooden church of St. Michael.

=== First restoration ===
In 1981, pastor Buppha Salupshua with a budget of 200,000 Baht donated by Mrs. Thanom of Bangkok, had the old wooden roof replaced with corrugated iron sheets.

=== Second restoration ===
In 1994, pastor Boonlert Promsena presided over extensive repairs of termite damage, necessitating the replacement of 124 of 227 poles, new planks for the platforms, elevation of doors and windows, and complete painting, inside and out.

=== Third restoration ===
The third restoration was a project begun in 2006 to prepare the church for its centennial celbartion in 2008. The stated objectives were (English version):

1. To conserve this largest wooden church as traditional patrimony and heritage for traditional society with regards to its worth of culture and faith.

2. To provide a round spiritual preparation for the Catholics of Ban-Nong-Song-Yae for the first centenary celebration in A.D.2008 on this soil.

3. To make a well-planned restoration of the church and its surroundings as a place for peaceful serenity and for tourism visit.

== Architecture ==
The main sanctuary is constructed of timber in a classic Thai style, and is billed as the Largest Wooden church in Thailand. It has been designated by the Tourism Authority of Thailand as a site Unseen in Thailand.

== Modern times ==
The Church is still active today. The third restoration for the 2008 centennial was followed in 2009 by the opening of a museum dedicated to the memory of the church's founder, the Reverend Desaval.

=== School ===
The church grounds of approximately 100 rai (16 hectares; 40 acres) also host a fully accredited school, Songyae Wittaya (โรงเรียนซ่งแย้วิทยา) for children in kindergarten (อนุบาล) through senior high school (มัธยมสาม) with a total enrollment of 960 students in 2010.

=== Heritage designation ===
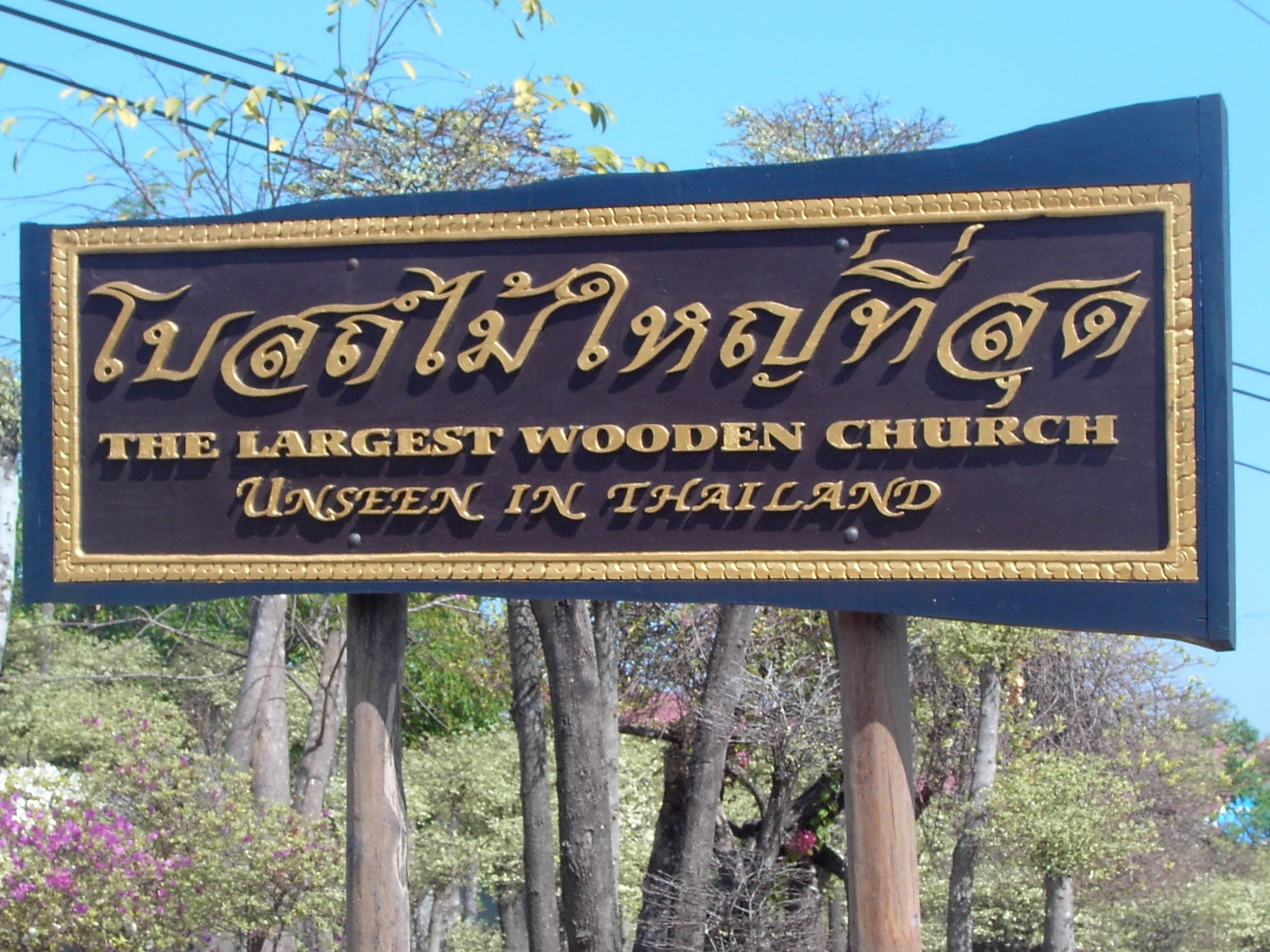

The Tourism Authority of Thailand (TAT) has designated the church as a unique cultural heritage site of the sort Unseen in Thailand.

== See also ==
- Saint Michael
