= Thai Charoen district =

Thai Charoen ไทยเจริญ
- District
- District location in Yasothon province
- Coordinates: 16°3′47″N 104°26′50″E
- Country: Thailand
- Province: Yasothon
- Seat: Thai Charoen

Area
  - Total: 272.02 km^{2} (105.03 sq mi)

Population (2005)
  - Total: 29,842
  - Density: 109.7/km^{2} (284/sq mi)
- Time zone: UTC+7 (ICT)
- Postal code: 35120
- Geocode: 3509

Thai Charoen (Thai: ไทยเจริญ, pronounced [tʰāj tɕā.rɤ̄ːn]; Northeastern Thai: ไทยเจริญ, pronounced [tʰâj tɕā.lɤ̂ːn]) is a district of Yasothon province in northeastern Thailand.

== History ==
Thai Charoen, formerly a sub-district (tambon) of Loeng Nok Tha, was established as a minor district (king amphoe) on 1 April 1992, consisting of five sub-districts formerly of Loeng Nok Tha.

On 11 October 1997, Thai Charoen was raised to district (amphoe) status, becoming Yasothon's ninth and Thailand's 784th district.

The area has been home to the Roman Catholic St Michael's Church, Songyae, since 1908.

== Geography ==
Neighboring districts are (from the south clockwise): Pa Tio, Kut Chum, and Loeng Nok Tha, of Yasothon Province; Senangkhanikhom and Mueang Amnat Charoen of Amnat Charoen province.

== Administration ==
The district is divided into five sub-districts (tambons), and 48 villages (mubans).

1. Thai Charoen (ไทยเจริญ)
2. Nam Kham (น้ำคำ)
3. Som Pho (ส้มผ่อ)
4. Kham Toei (คำเตย)
5. Kham Phai (คำไผ่)

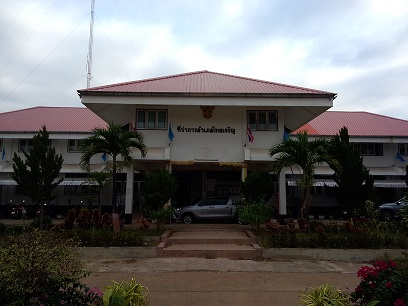
Thai Charoen District office

== Education ==
The secondary schools in Thai Charoen are:

- Kham Toei Witthaya School (โรงเรียนคำเตยวิทยา)
- Nam Kham Witthaya School (โรงเรียนน้ำคำวิทยา)
- Songyae Wittaya (โรงเรียนซ่งแย้วิทยา)
