= Pa Tio district =

Pa Tio ป่าติ้ว
- District
- District location in Yasothon province
- Coordinates: 15°49′53″N 104°23′8″E
- Country: Thailand
- Province: Yasothon
- Seat: Pho Sai

Area
  - Total: 308 km^{2} (119 sq mi)

Population (2005)
  - Total: 35,398
  - Density: 114.9/km^{2} (298/sq mi)
- Time zone: UTC+7 (ICT)
- Postal code: 35150
- Geocode: 3505

Pa Tio (Thai: ป่าติ้ว, pronounced [pàː tîw]; Northeastern Thai: ป่าติ้ว, pronounced [páː tîw]) is a district of Yasothon province in northeastern Thailand.

== History ==
Around 1889, there was an influx of Lao settlers into the Isan region after a large area of Thailand east of the Mekong River was ceded to the French. Among the villages established in this migration was Ban Pa Tio.

In 1933, the Highway Department built a road from Yasothon to Mueang Amnat Charoen district and Khemarat district, which were then all districts of Ubon Ratchathani province. The road passed through Pa Tio village, and led to its growth and expansion. In 1951, a petition was made for Pa Tio to be given minor district (king amphoe) status with jurisdiction over three (tambons): Pho Sai, Krachai, and Khok Na Ko, but it was not until 17 August 1966 that it was officially made so. It became effective on 1 September 1966.

In 1969, Pa Tio was raised to district (amphoe) status, in Ubon Ratchathani Province. When Yasothon became a separate province on 1 March 1972, Pa Tio was one of six districts assigned to the new province.

== Geography ==
Neighboring districts are (from the west clockwise): Mueang Yasothon, Kut Chum, Thai Charoen of Yasothon Province; Mueang Amnat Charoen and Hua Taphan of Amnat Charoen province; and Kham Khuean Kaeo of Yasothon Province.

== Administration ==
The district is divided into five sub-districts (tambons) with 57 villages (mubans).

No.	Name	Thai name	Villages	Pop.
1.	Pho Sai	โพธิ์ไทร	12	6,502
2.	Krachai	กระจาย	13	7,780
3.	Khok Na Ko	โคกนาโก	16	8,216
4.	Chiang Pheng	เชียงเพ็ง	7	3,621
5.	Si Than	ศรีฐาน	8	6,226
