= Sai Mun district =

Sai Mun ทรายมูล
- District
- District location in Yasothon province
- Coordinates: 15°56′22″N 104°12′32″E
- Country: Thailand
- Province: Yasothon
- Seat: Sai Mun

Area
  - Total: 272.8 km^{2} (105.3 sq mi)

Population (2005)
  - Total: 31,092
  - Density: 114/km^{2} (300/sq mi)
- Time zone: UTC+7 (ICT)
- Postal code: 35170
- Geocode: 3502

Sai Mun (Thai: ทรายมูล, pronounced [sāːj mūːn]; Northeastern Thai: ทรายมูล, pronounced [sâːj mûːn]) is a district of Yasothon province in northeastern Thailand.

== History ==
Sai Mun village was formerly a village of Yasothon District, when it was still part of Ubon Ratchathani province. The village changed locations around the time of King Rama V when an epidemic caused villagers to abandon their homes and start a new village two kilometers away. At the site of their new village, which is present-day Sai Mun village, the villagers brought sand and soil from various sacred and revered places, and scattered it around the perimeter of their new home, to drive off the epidemic. It was from this ceremony that the village received its name.

Later, Sai Mun was given tambon status, and in 1968, Sanitary district (khet sukhaphiban) Sai Mun was created.

After the separation of Yasothon from Ubon in 1972, on 15 May 1975, Sai Mun was elevated to a minor district (king amphoe), taking four tambons from Mueang Yasothon District: Sai Mun, Du Lat, Dong Mafai, and Na Wiang.

In 1978, tambon Phai was reassigned from Kut Chum district to King Amphoe Sai Mun.

On 26 July 1984, the minor district was elevated to a district, and on 25 May 1999 Sanitary District Sai Mun was elevated to township (thesaban tambon) status.

== Geography ==
Neighboring districts are (from the northeast clockwise) Kut Chum and Mueang Yasothon of Yasothon Province, and Selaphum of Roi Et province.

== Administration ==
The district is divided into five sub-districts (tambons) with 53 villages (mubans).

No.	Name	Thai name	Villages	Pop.
1.	Sai Mun	ทรายมูล	16	4,890
2.	Du Lat	ดู่ลาด	12	4,426
3.	Dong Mafai	ดงมะไฟ	9	5,740
4.	Na Wiang	นาเวียง	7	3,958
5.	Phai	ไผ่	9	5,900

== Education ==
=== Primary schools ===
As of 2003, Sai Mun had 25 primary schools with 2,737 students.

=== Secondary schools ===
As of 2003, Sai Mun had two secondary schools with 1,724 students:

- Sai Mun Witthaya School (โรงเรียนทรายมูลวิทยา)
- Dong Mafai Phitthayakhom School (โรงเรียนดงมะไฟพิทยาคม)
