= Nong Phok district =

Nong Phok หนองพอก
- District
- District location in Roi Et province
- Coordinates: 16°18′35″N 104°12′11″E
- Country: Thailand
- Province: Roi Et
- Seat: Nong Phok

Area
  - Total: 599.5 km^{2} (231.5 sq mi)

Population (2005)
  - Total: 64,646
  - Density: 107.8/km^{2} (279/sq mi)
- Time zone: UTC+7 (ICT)
- Postal code: 45210
- Geocode: 4509

Nong Phok (Thai: หนองพอก, pronounced [nɔ̌ːŋ pʰɔ̂ːk]) is a district (amphoe) in the northeastern part of Roi Et province, northeastern Thailand.

== Geography ==
Neighboring districts are (from the south clockwise): Selaphum, Phon Thong, and Moei Wadi of Roi Et Province; Nong Sung of Mukdahan province; and Loeng Nok Tha and Kut Chum of Yasothon province.

== History ==
The district history goes back to the small village Ban Nong Phok, which was part of tambon Kok Pho, Phon Thong district. It was made a minor district (king amphoe) on 16 June 1965, then consisting of the two tambons Kok Pho and Bueng Ngam. It was upgraded to a full district on 28 June 1973.

== Places ==
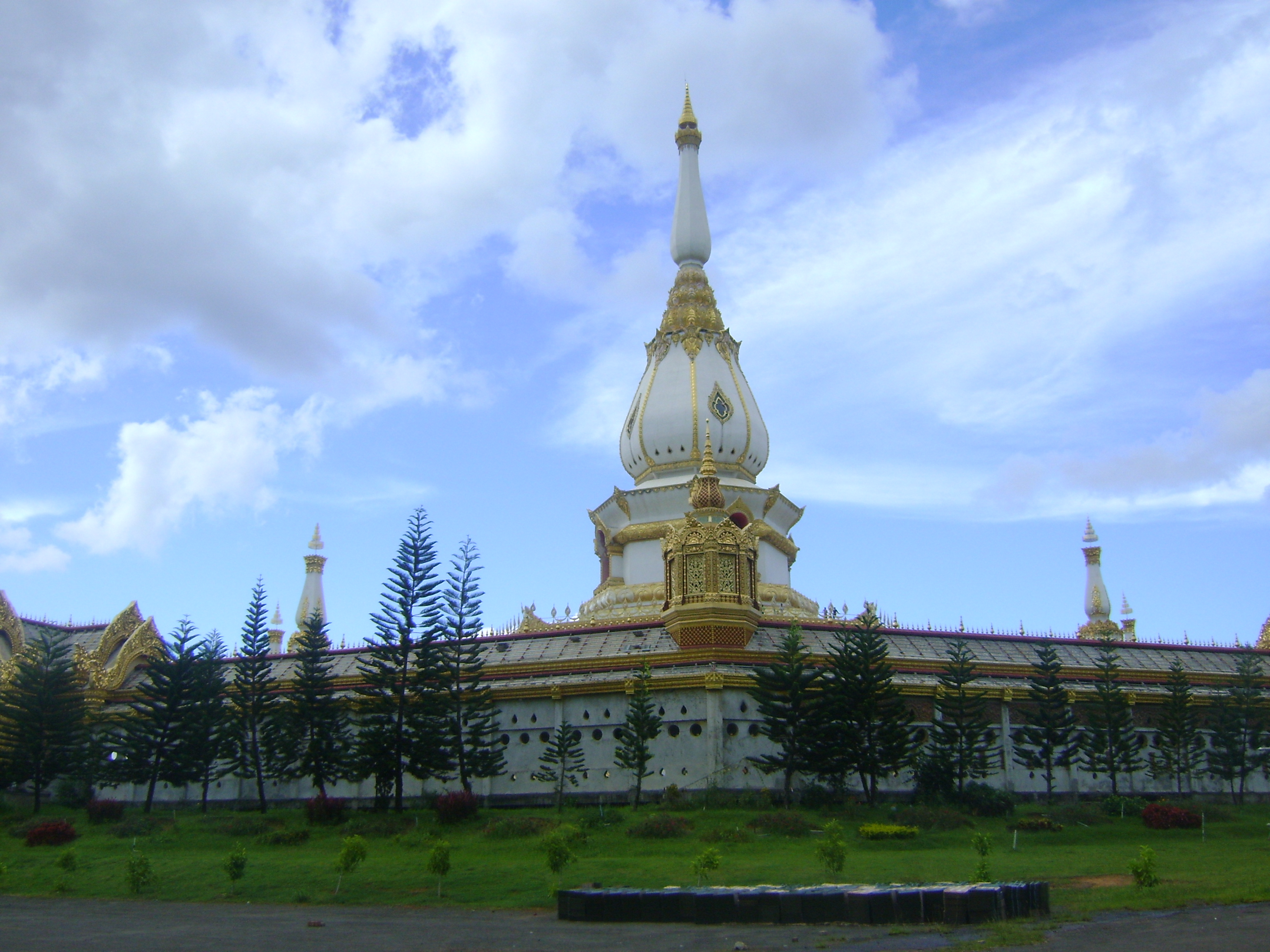
Phra Maha Chedi Chai Mongkol

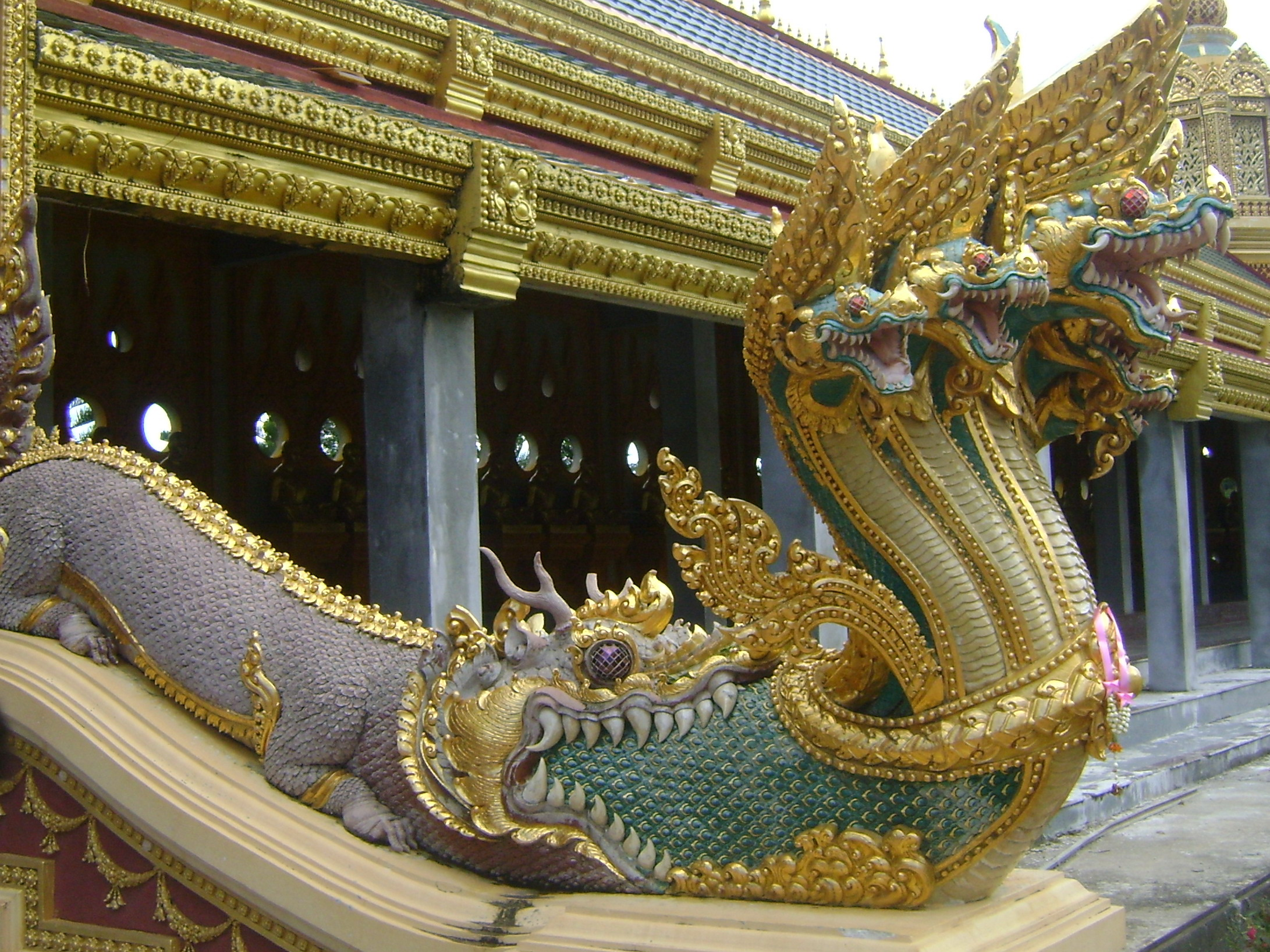
Phra Maha Chedi Chai Mongkol Naga emerging from mouth of Chinese dragon

Phra Maha Chedi Chai Mongkol (Thai: พระมหาเจดีชัยมงคล) on the premises of Wat Pha Namthip Thep Prasit Vararam is one of the largest chedis in Thailand. It measures 101 metres wide, 101 metres long, and 101 metres high. The chedi is on 101 rai (16.16 hectares, very nearly 40 acres.) The number "101" symbolises the name of the province: roi-et is one hundred one in Thai numerals. The five-tiered chedi containing Buddha relics is decorated with elaborate designs in a contemporary style. The sides of the stairway leading into the central courtyard recall legendary origins in China and the subsequent adoption of Buddhism with multi-headed Nāgas emerging from the mouth of Chinese dragons. N 16° 19.932 E 104° 19.212 Waymark Code: WM95XK

== Administration ==
The district is divided into nine sub-districts (tambons), which are further subdivided into 120 villages (mubans). Nong Phok is a township (thesaban tambon) which covers parts of tambons Nong Phok and Rop Mueang. There are a further nine tambon administrative organizations (TAO).

No.	Name	Thai name	Villages	Pop.
1.	Nong Phok	หนองพอก	14	9,118
2.	Bueng Ngam	บึงงาม	11	5,392
3.	Phukhao Thong	ภูเขาทอง	17	9,611
4.	Kok Pho	กกโพธิ์	12	6,435
5.	Khok Sawang	โคกสว่าง	10	4,651
6.	Nong Khun Yai	หนองขุ่นใหญ่	13	7,955
7.	Rop Mueang	รอบเมือง	19	9,555
8.	Pha Nam Yoi	ผาน้ำย้อย	13	6,015
9.	Tha Sida	ท่าสีดา	11	5,914
