= Kut Chum district =

Kut Chum กุดชุม
- District
- District location in Yasothon province
- Coordinates: 16°2′0″N 104°20′17″E
- Country: Thailand
- Province: Yasothon
- Seat: Kut Chum

Area
  - Total: 544.0 km^{2} (210.0 sq mi)

Population (2005)
  - Total: 65,959
  - Density: 121.25/km^{2} (314.0/sq mi)
- Time zone: UTC+7 (ICT)
- Postal code: 35140
- Geocode: 3503

Kut Chum (Thai: กุดชุม, pronounced [kùt tɕʰūm]; Northeastern Thai: กุดซุม, pronounced [kǔt su᷇m]) is a district (amphoe) of Yasothon province in northeastern Thailand.

== History ==
The village of Kut Chum was established in 1912. A minor district (king amphoe), Kut Chum was established on 1 August 1961. It was composed of the four sub-districts: Non Pueai, Phai (in 1978 reassigned to Sai Mun District), Phon Ngan, and Kammaet, all split off from Mueang Yasothon district.

On 17 July 1963, it was elevated to the level of district (amphoe), then of Ubon Ratchathani province. When Yasothon was separated from Ubon, Kut Chum was one of the districts assigned to the new province.

== Geography ==
Neighboring districts are (from the northeast clockwise): Loeng Nok Tha, Thai Charoen, Pa Tio, Mueang Yasothon, and Sai Mun of Yasothon Province, and Selaphum and Nong Phok of Roi Et province.

== Economy ==
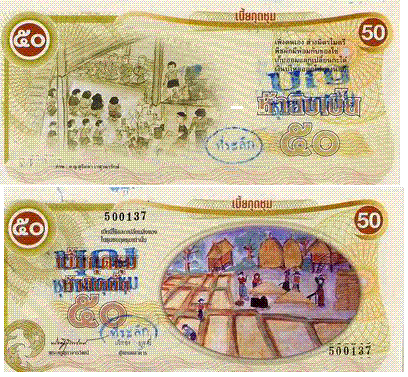

Kut Chum is known for its organic movement and organic foods, chiefly the organic farming of rice. Kut Chum is also known for issuing its own local scrip called Bia Kut Chum. Bia, Thai for 'cowry shell', was once a unit of currency equal to 1/6400 of a Thai baht, and bia is used in metaphorical expressions, so the usage ran afoul of currency laws. To side-step implications that they intended a substitute local currency, they changed to Boon Kut Chum, which are barter coupons with a fixed value in baht, that may be exchanged for goods and services in the community.

== Administration ==
The district is divided into nine sub-districts (tambons) and 125 villages (mubans).

1. Kut Chum (กุดชุม)
2. Non Pueai (โนนเปือย)
3. Kammaet (กำแมด)
4. Na So (นาโส่)
5. Huai Kaeng (ห้วยแก้ง)
6. Nong Mi (หนองหมี)
7. Phon Ngam (โพนงาม) web site (Thai)
8. Kham Nam Sang (คำน้ำสร้าง)
9. Nong Nae (หนองแหน)

=== Local administration ===
Kut Chum Phatthana is a sub-district municipality (thesaban tambon) which covers parts of sub-districts Kut Chum and Non Pueai. There are a further nine tambon administrative organizations (TAO), one for each sub-district covering the non-municipal areas.

== See also ==
- Rosana Tositrakul
