= Ban Singh Tha =

Historic neighbourhood in Northeastern Thailand

Coordinates: 15°47′29.78″N 104°8′24.35″E

Ban Singh Tha (Thai: บ้านสิงห์ท่า; also spelled Ban Sing Tha, Baan Sing Tha) is a historic neighbourhood of Mueang Yasothon District, Yasothon Province, Isan (Northeastern Thailand), regarded as an old town zone that is filled with ancient buildings that remains the same in the past. It is surrounded by Sri Sunthon, Nakhon Thum, Uthai Rammarit and Witthaya Thamrong Roads.

Before being named as Yasothon, the town was formerly called "Ban Singh Tha", which means "residence of singh (mythical lion) pier" or "residence of singh posture" in another sense. Later, in the reign of King Phutthaloetla Naphalai (Rama II), it was upgraded to be a town and royally named as "Mueang Yot Sun Thon" (เมืองยศสุนทร), meaning upholding its rank and was distorted to be "Yasothon" in the present day.

Ban Singh Tha is the old town was once a booming trading area since it was the point where the commercial ships of Chinese merchants from Korat docked and traded goods with the locals. Today, there are might be quiet and lifeless as time passes by, but traces of the past glorious days combining the local charms still remains.

Architectural buildings like mud houses over 200 years old, Sino-Portuguese style buildings that were constructed before similar buildings in Phuket, wooden row shophouses, theater, Ho trai (scripture temple hall) as well as legends, folktales and beliefs about sacred things including traditional food and the way of the locals living are evidence of the mix of culture that remain to be seen at this place.

At present, every Wednesday from 04.00 pm to 08.00 pm. It will be converted into a pedestrian street to promote tourism and preserve the local identity.
