= Senangkhanikhom district =

Senangkhanikhom เสนางคนิคม
- District
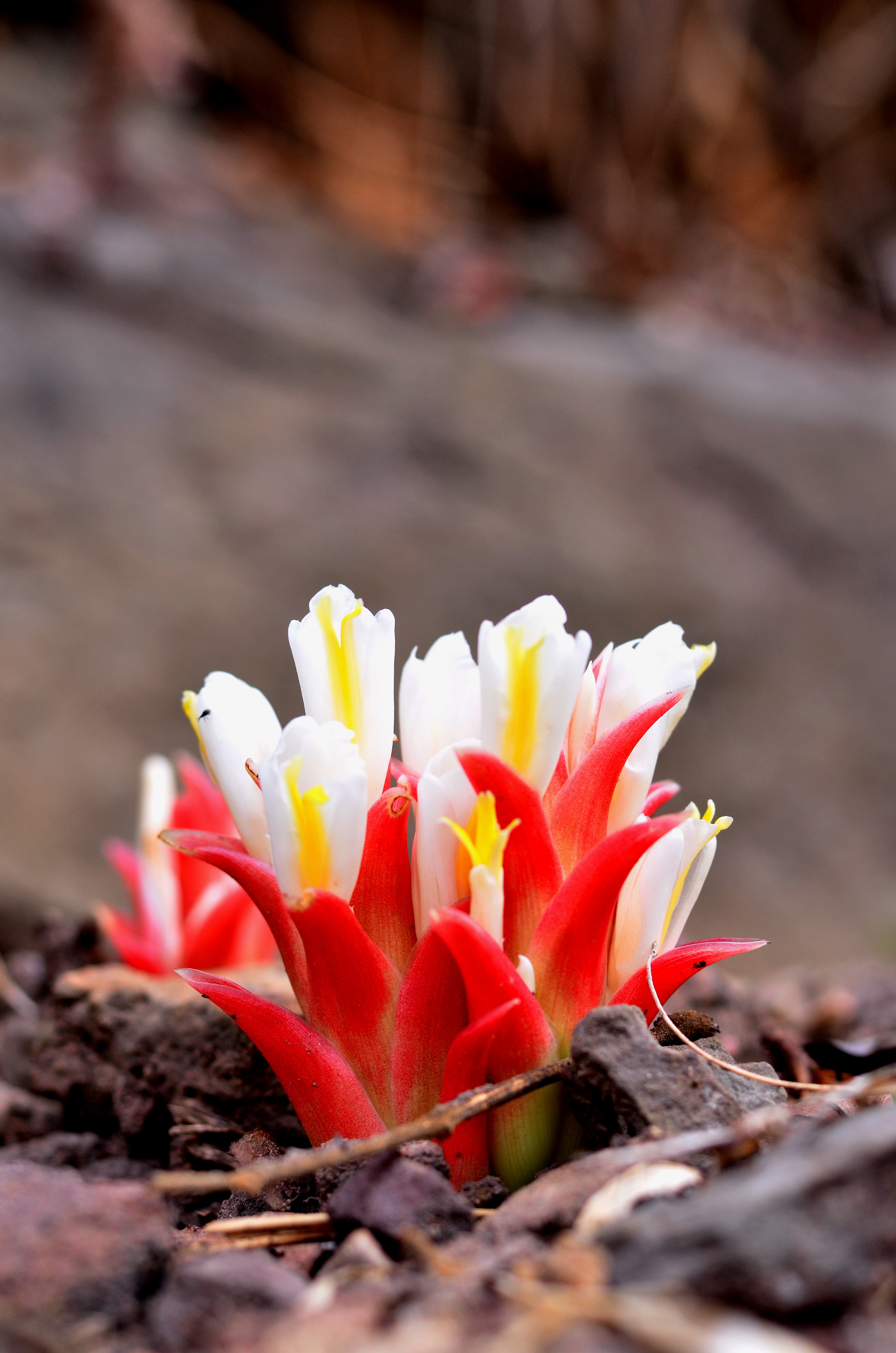
- White angel flower on Phu Phon Thong, Senangkhanikhom

- District location in Amnat Charoen province
- Coordinates: 16°2′18″N 104°40′12″E
- Country: Thailand
- Province: Amnat Charoen
- Seat: Senangkhanikhom

Area
  - Total: 526.0 km^{2} (203.1 sq mi)

Population (2005)
  - Total: 40,188
  - Density: 76.4/km^{2} (198/sq mi)
- Time zone: UTC+7 (ICT)
- Postal code: 37290
- Geocode: 3705

Senangkhanikhom (Thai: เสนางคนิคม, pronounced [sěː.nāːŋ.kʰá(ʔ).ní(ʔ).kʰōm]; Northeastern Thai: เสนางคนิคม, pronounced [sěː.nâːŋ.kʰà(ʔ).nì(ʔ).kʰôm]) is a district (amphoe) in the northern part of Amnat Charoen province, northeastern Thailand.

== Geography ==
Neighbouring districts are (from the east clockwise): Chanuman, Mueang Amnat Charoen of Amnat Charoen Province and Thai Charoen and Thai Charoen of Yasothon province.

== History ==
The minor district (king amphoe) was created on 15 December 1975, when the five tambons, Senangkhanikhom, Rai Si Suk, Phon Thong, Nong Hai, and Na Wiang were split off from Mueang Amnat Charoen district. It was upgraded to a full district on 1 April 1983. In 1993 it was one of the districts split off from Ubon Ratchathani to form the new province, Amnat Charoen.

== Administration ==
The district is divided into six sub-districts (tambons), which are further subdivided into 58 villages (mubans). Senangkhanikhom is a township (thesaban tambon) which covers parts of tambon Senangkhanikhom. There are further six tambon administrative organizations (TAO).

| No. | Name | Thai name | Villages | Pop. |
|---|---|---|---|---|
| 1. | Senangkhanikhom | เสนางคนิคม | 15 | 12,095 |
| 2. | Phon Thong | โพนทอง | 10 | 5,432 |
| 3. | Rai Si Suk | ไร่สีสุก | 9 | 5,266 |
| 4. | Na Wiang | นาเวียง | 9 | 6,651 |
| 5. | Nong Hai | หนองไฮ | 9 | 6,499 |
| 6. | Nong Sam Si | หนองสามสี | 6 | 4,245 |
