= Mueang Amnat Charoen district =

Mueang Amnat Charoen เมืองอำนาจเจริญ
- District
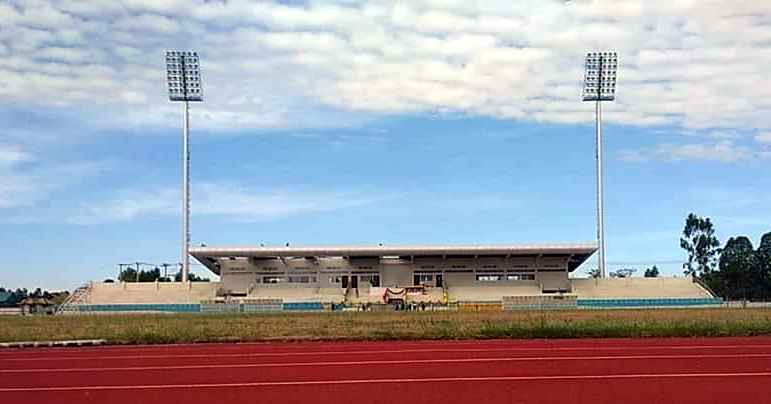
- Amnat Charoen Province Stadium

- District location in Amnat Charoen province
- Coordinates: 15°51′30″N 104°37′46″E
- Country: Thailand
- Province: Amnat Charoen
- Seat: Bung

Area
  - Total: 598.8 km^{2} (231.2 sq mi)

Population (2008)
  - Total: 128,992
  - Density: 216.2/km^{2} (560/sq mi)
- Time zone: UTC+7 (ICT)
- Postal code: 37000
- Geocode: 3701

Mueang Amnat Charoen (Thai: เมืองอำนาจเจริญ, pronounced [mɯ̄aŋ ʔām.nâːt tɕā.rɤ̄ːn]; Northeastern Thai: เมืองอำนาจเจริญ, pronounced [mɯ̂aŋ ʔàm.nâːt tɕā.lɤ̂ːn]) is the capital district (amphoe mueang) of Amnat Charoen province, northeastern Thailand.

== History ==
Originally Amnat Charoen was a mueang under Mueang Khemarat. In the Thesaphiban administrative reforms around 1900 it was reassigned to Ubon Ratchathani and converted into a district. It was later named Bung after the central tambon. In 1939 it was renamed Amnat Charoen. In 1993 the new province Amnat Charoen was created, and the district was then renamed Mueang Amnat Charoen.

== Geography ==
Neighboring districts are (from the north clockwise): Senangkhanikhom, Pathum Ratchawongsa, Phana, Lue Amnat, and Hua Taphan of Amnat Charoen Province, and Pa Tio and Thai Charoen of Yasothon province.

== Administration ==
The district is divided into 19 sub-districts (tambons), which are further subdivided into 213 villages (mubans). The town (thesaban mueang) Amnat Charoen covers parts of the tambon Bung. Nam Plik is a sub-district municipality (thesaban tambon) which covers parts of the same-named tambon. Na Wong, Na Mo Ma, and Na Yom are sub-district municipalities which cover the full same-named subdistricts. There are a further 16 tambon administrative organizations (TAO).

No.	Name	Thai	Villages	Pop.
1.	Bung	บุ่ง	23	28,931
2.	Kai Kham	ไก่คำ	13	8,111
3.	Na Chik	นาจิก	8	4,187
4.	Pla Khao	ปลาค้าว	12	5,656
5.	Lao Phruan	เหล่าพรวน	8	3,915
6.	Sang Nok Tha	สร้างนกทา	16	6,385
7.	Khuem Yai	คึมใหญ่	10	5,408
8.	Na Phue	นาผือ	12	6,728
9.	Nam Plik	น้ำปลีก	10	7,676
10.	Na Wang	นาวัง	11	4,632
11.	Na Mo Ma	นาหมอม้า	8	4,016
12.	Non Pho	โนนโพธิ์	11	6,537
13.	Non Nam Thaeng	โนนหนามแท่ง	14	7,928
14.	Huai Rai	ห้วยไร่	10	5,413
15.	Nong Masaeo	หนองมะแซว	13	4,236
16.	Kut Pla Duk	กุดปลาดุก	12	5,870
17.	Don Moei	ดอนเมย	5	2,822
18.	Na Yom	นายม	8	5,072
19.	Na Tae	นาแต้	9	5,469
