= Yasothon =

Town in Yasothon province, Thailand

Yasothon (Former Yashodharapura) ยโสธร
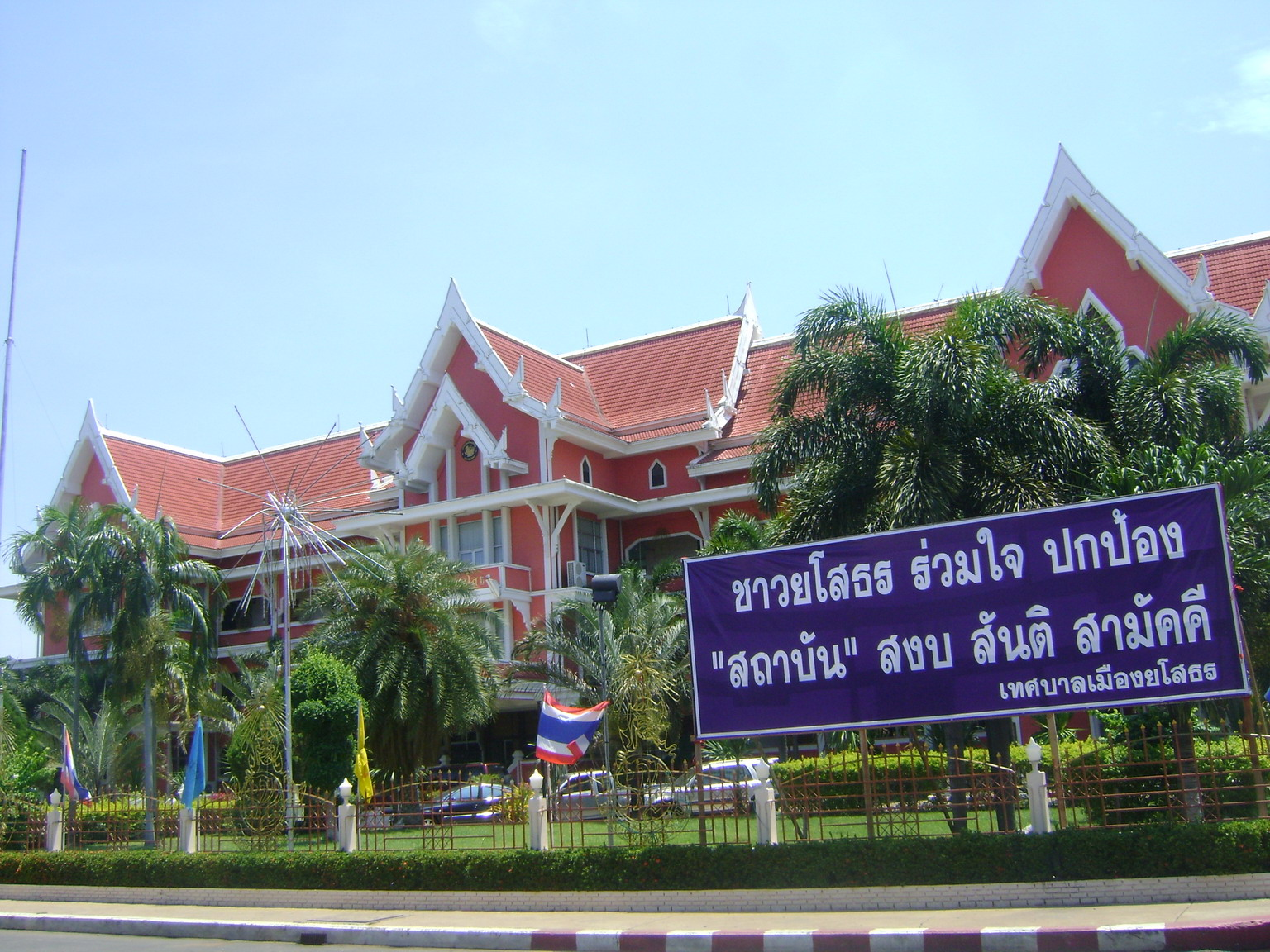
- Yasothon Municipal Hall
- Nickname: Mueang Yot Nakorn (Proud Capital City)
- Location in Thailand
- Coordinates: 15°47′50″N 104°08′35″E
- Country: Thailand
- Province: Yasothon province
- District: Mueang Yasothon district

Population (2005)
  - Total: 21,134
- Time zone: UTC+7 (ICT)
- Postal code: 35000
- Thai highway: [2169]

Yasothon (Yashodharapura) (Thai: ยโสธร, pronounced [já.sǒː.tʰɔ̄ːn]) is a town on the Chi River in the north-eastern region of Thailand. It is the capital and administrative center of Yasothon province (former Yashodharapura city) and seat of its city district. In this district, subdistrict Nai Mueang (ในเมือง 'in town') incorporates the bounds of the town proper, which had a population of 21,134 in 2005. It lies 531 km (330 mi) north-east of Bangkok.

== History ==
=== Founding ===
In 2354 B.E. (1811 CE) Chao ('lord') Racha Wong Singh (เจ้าราชวงศ์สิงห์ — 'descended from lions') more often transliterated sing, led his people to a landing on the River Chi, to found a town on a bluff near a deserted temple. The lion, Sing, was a son of Chao Phraya Wichai (เจ้าพระยาวิชัยฯ) in the capital of Champasak (นครจำปาศักดิ์). The town was first called Ban Sing Kow (บ้านสิงห์เก่า 'old lion village') or Ban Sing Tha (บ้านสิงห์ท่า). While there are numerous Khmer artifacts in and around the city, no written history is known prior to that year.

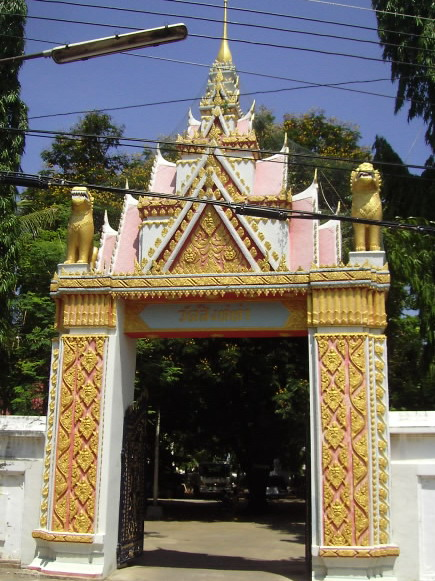
Wat Singh Tha Lion Gate

A weather-worn and now nearly illegible marker erected by Thailand's Fine Arts department (กรมศิลปากร) for a Khmer chedi by Wat Sing Tha, related that during the Thonburi Era, grandson Thao Kham Su (ท้าวคำสู) called the settlement Ban Sing Thong (บ้านสิงห์ทอง Ban Gold Lion). The wat, which had been deserted until dense jungle growth blocked the landing, was cleared, re-built and renamed after the new village. The change from Thong ('gold') to Tha (ท่า) was influenced by two factors: Tha means 'port' or 'landing'. and also pose with many connotations. Thus the change in name to Sing Tha means 'port lion', and also 'imposing lion' such as those posed on the Lion Gate, and on pedestals on the temple grounds.

=== Name changes ===
In 2357 B.E. (1814), King Rama II announced a change in the town's name to Mueang Yasothon (เมืองยโสธร). The name proposed had been Mueang Yotsunthon (เมืองยศสุนทร.) (The yaso ยโส part of the name translates as 'arrogant: one pretending to yot ยศ 'high rank'. This may not have been the intention: compare Yasodharapura and Yasovarman.) At the same time, the chao ('lord') of Yasothon received a new style (manner of address): Phra Sunthonratchawongsa (พระสุนทรราชวงศา).

Yasothon was successively governed by five Phra Sunthon Ratcha Wongsa: Singh or Sing, 1815–1823; Thao Sicha, 1823; Fai, 1823–1857; Thao Men, 1857–1873; Suphrom, 1873–1895.

During the 1827–1829 Laotian Rebellion led by Chao Anouvong, Fai was active in encouraging left (eastern) bank people to migrate to establish their muang on the right (western) bank of the Mekong. King Rama III, in recognition of his achievements, also appointed him as chao muang of Nakhon Phanom, and he briefly governed both Yasothon and Nakhon Phanom.

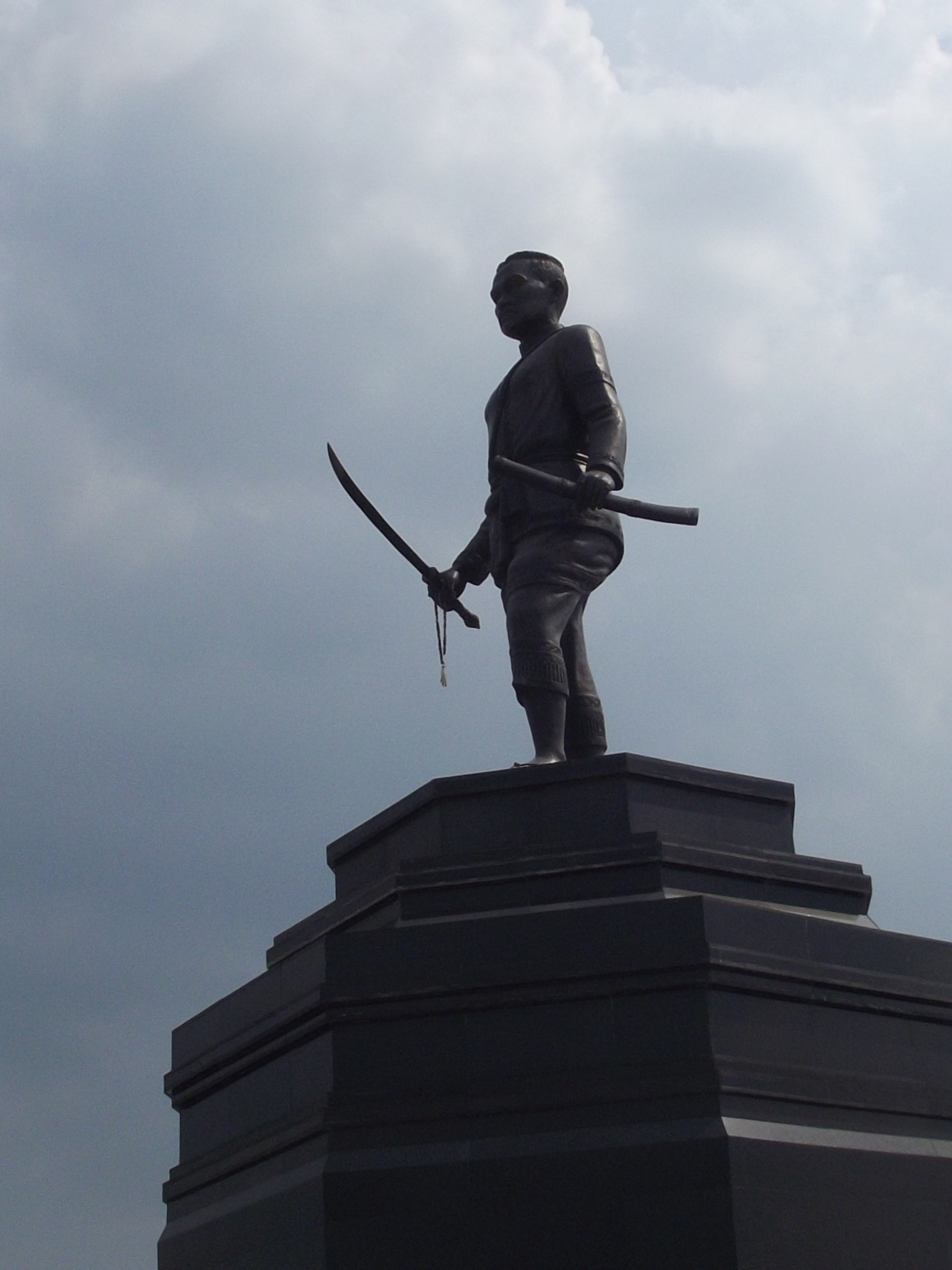
Phra Sunthon Ratcha Wongsa Singh

On 15 August 2011, a monument to Singh, the first Phra Sunthon Ratcha Wongsa, was erected on the grounds of Wat Srithammaram.

The town's unofficial nickname is Mueang Yot Nakhon เมืองยศนคร 'Proud capital'.

=== Bodindecha ===
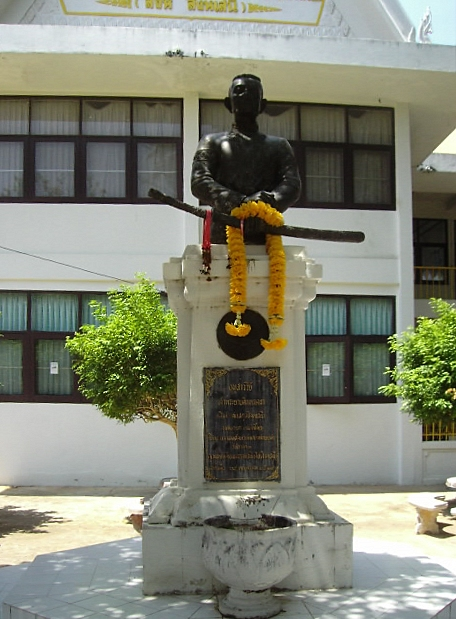
Monument to Gen. Singh at Wat Phra That Anon

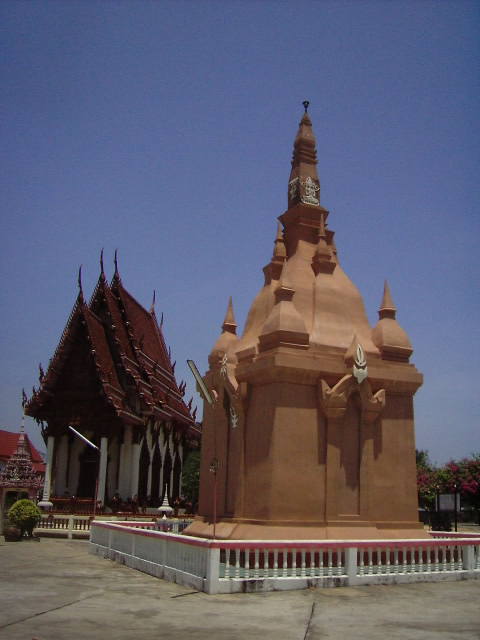
Wat Tung Sawang chedi

Chao Phraya Bodindecha (เจ้าพระยาบดินทรเดชา) (1777–1849), (given name, Singh or Sing; family name, Singhaseni (สิงห์ ต้นสกุลสิงหเสนี) was a chancellor (สมุห์บัญชี) and army general (แม่ทัพใหญ่) during the reign of Rama III (1824–1851). He led the army from Bangkok that put down the 1826–1828 Laotian Rebellion (ปราบกบฎ) of Chao Anouvong of Vientiane (เจ้าอนุวงศ์ เวียงจันทน์). General Sing then brought his army to Yasothon to regroup. The site is now Wat Tung Sawang Chaiyaphum (วัดทุ่งสว่างชัยภูมิ 'field of bright victory',) featuring a nine-spire chedi. The chedi contains the golden image of a captive, and near the south wall is a Buddha footprint.

Camp Bodindecha (ค่ายบดินทรเดชา), west of the city proper in Ban Doet (บ้านเดิด), Tambon Doet, is named in his honor. The camp has been home to the Royal Thai Army 16th Infantry Regiment (กรมทหารราบที่ ๑๖) since 23 December 1985.

=== Municipality ===
The local administration of Yasothon was created in 1944 as a subdistrict municipality. With the creation of Yasothon Province, the municipality was upgraded to a town municipality.

=== Chinese influence ===
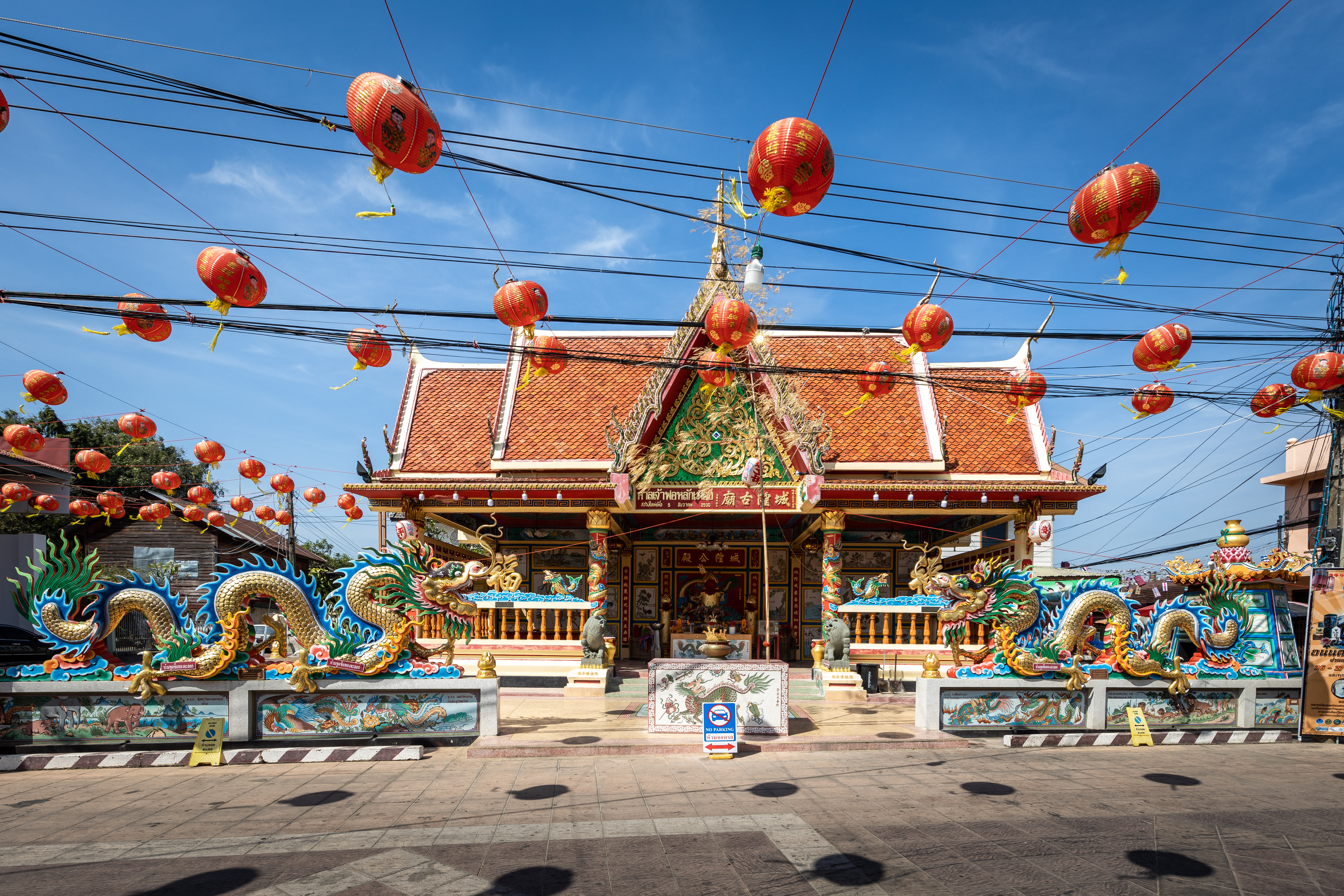
Yasothon City Pillar Shrine

The city has a significant Thai Chinese presence. The city pillar, erected in 2530 BE (1987), is housed in a shrine (ศาลเจ้าพ่อหลักเมือง) that resembles a Chinese temple. A Chinese warrior represents the city spirit in the annual parade celebrating the Chinese lunar date of the shrine's dedication.

== Rocket Festival ==
Yasothon's Rocket Festival (Thai: ประเพณีบุญบั้งไฟ, RTGS: prapheni bun bang fai) is held annually over a weekend that falls in the middle of May. The festival's origins lie in a custom of firing rockets into the sky at the start of the rice-growing season to remind King of the Sky, Phaya Thaen, to send promised rain. The festival is a competition marked by a weekend of celebration, including highly decorated floats parading through the town, accompanied by partying, dancing, music, and a fair. Friday the main thoroughfare is transformed into a parade ground lined on both sides by concert stages, which features mor lam performers throughout the evening. On Saturday, parade groups compete for prizes. Many of the traditional dances and floats have to do with the legend of Phadaeng Nang Ai, but others have to do with the year's particular theme. On Sunday, the action moves from the city center to Phaya Thaen Park at its eastern edge. The festival now takes the form of a competition to see whose rocket stays aloft the longest.

On 10 May 1999, the Yasothon Rocket Festival made world headlines when a 120 kg rocket exploded 50 meters above ground, just two seconds after launch, killing four persons and injuring 11.

== Tourism ==
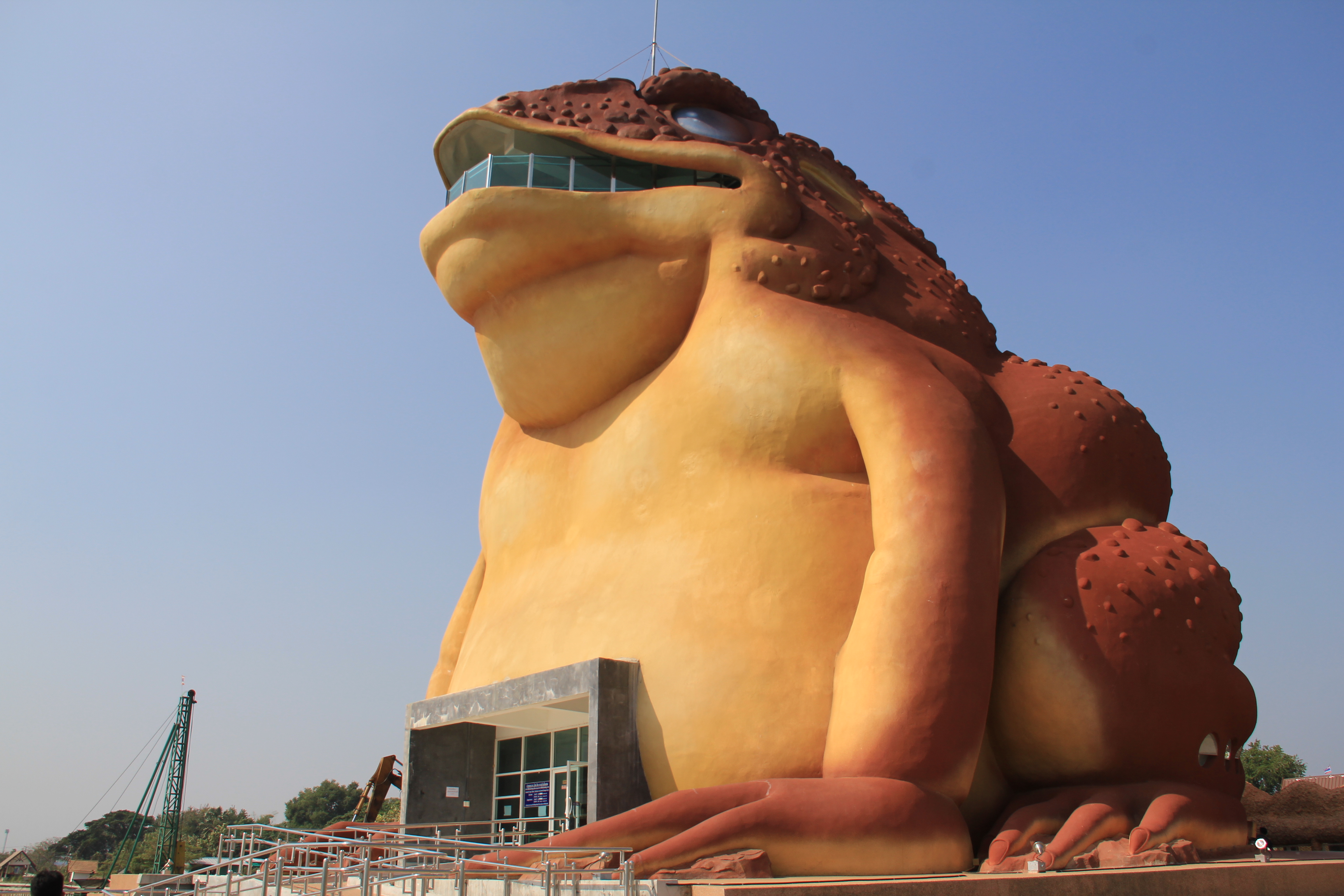
The toad museum in Yasothon is five stories tall, with exhibits and a viewing platform.

In 2015, to encourage tourism, a 5 floor museum in the shape of a toad was erected.

== Climate ==
Yasothon has three seasons: summer, rainy (monsoon) and winter. Maximum temperature is 43 °C (109.4 °F) and minimum temperature is 11 °C (51.8 °F). Average relative humidity is 71.1%. Average rainfall for the years 2009–2013 was 1,600 millimetres per year.

== Transport ==
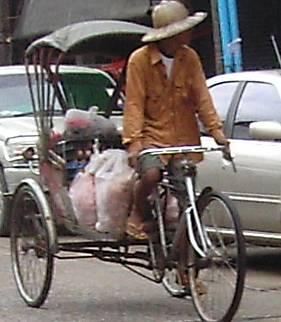
Samlo delivering goods

Yasothon city is about 500 km (310 mi) or seven hours drive from Bangkok at the intersection of Routes 23 and 202, and the southern end of Route 2169. Samlo serve the city centre, where tuk-tuks are prohibited. Motorcycle taxis with yellow license plates and drivers with identifying vests serve the city and outlying areas. Several bus lines connect daily and at frequent intervals to Bangkok's Northern Bus Terminal (Thai: หมอชิตใหม่, RTGS: mochit mai), as well as all bus terminals in the north and northeast. Ubon Ratchathani is 100 kilometres east via Route 23. Yasothon's bus terminal re-located from the city centre to Route 23 Bypass just east of the Ban Kham Noi Junction with Vittaya Thamrong Road, Rte YS-2018.15°48′35.25″N 104°9′25.43″E

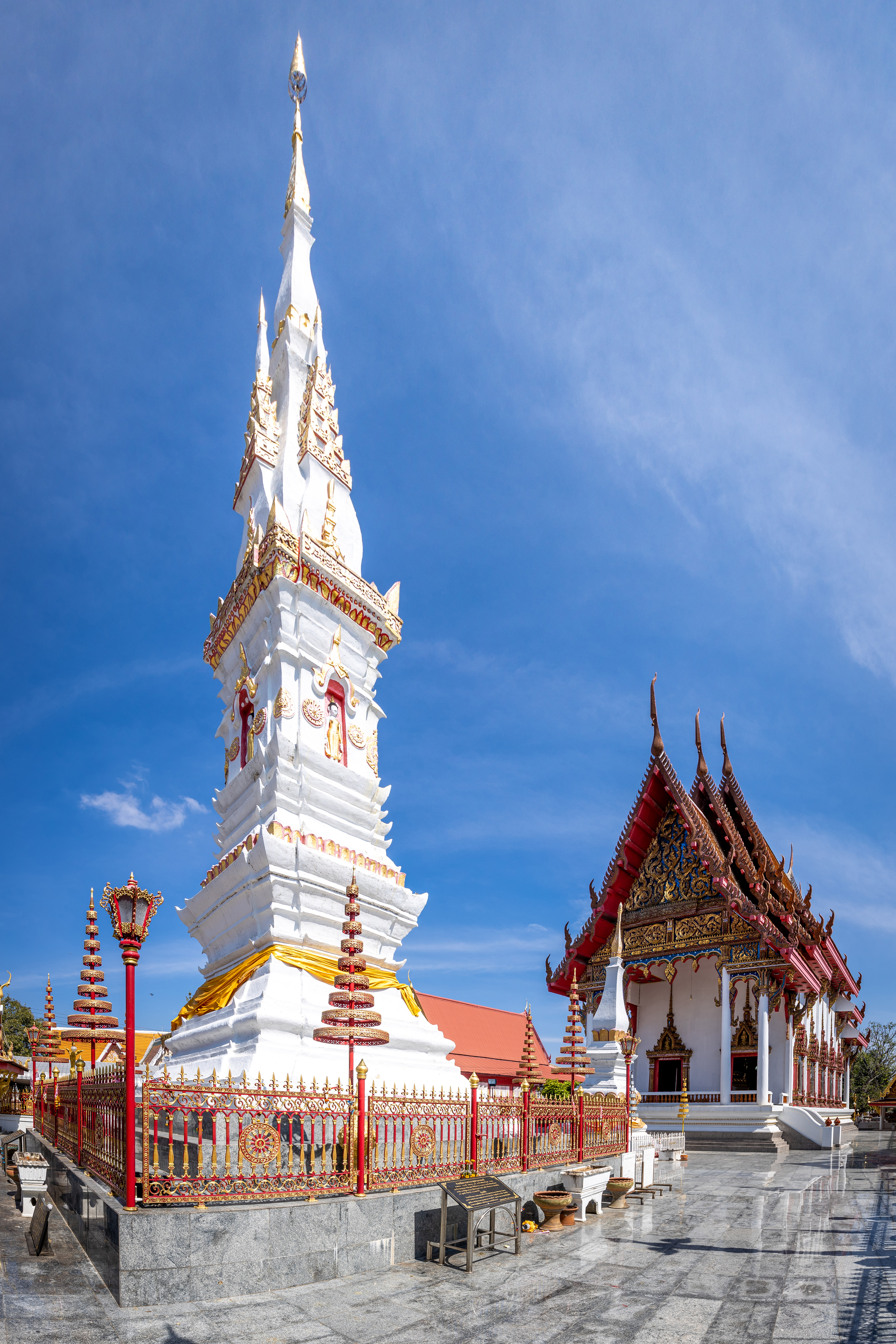
Wat That Anon
