= Mueang Yasothon district =

Mueang Yasothon เมืองยโสธร
- District
- District location in Yasothon province
- Coordinates: 15°47′41″N 104°8′26″E
- Country: Thailand
- Province: Yasothon
- Seat: Nai Mueang

Area
  - Total: 578.2 km^{2} (223.2 sq mi)

Population (2005)
  - Total: 129,999
  - Density: 224.8/km^{2} (582/sq mi)
- Time zone: UTC+7 (ICT)
- Postal code: 35000
- Geocode: 3501

Mueang Yasothon (Thai: เมืองยโสธร, pronounced [mɯ̄a̯ŋ já.sǒː.tʰɔ̄ːn]) is the capital district of Yasothon province in northeastern Thailand on the Chi River. Sub-district Nai Mueang (ในเมือง, 'in the town') defines the city limits of the town of Yasothon.

== History ==
According to the chronicles of Mueang Yasothon, in 1795 Phra Chao Worawongsa (Phra Wo), Minister of Vientiane, and several others set off to live with the king of Champassak. Along the way they came to a jungle where spirits dwelt, and seeing that it was a good place, they built a village there next to the grounds of an abandoned wat. They called it Wat Singh Tha (วัดสิงห์ท่า), which remains to this day. The village they called Ban Singh Tha (บ้านสิงห์ท่า). Singh is a mythical lion; tha (ท่า) means 'pose'.

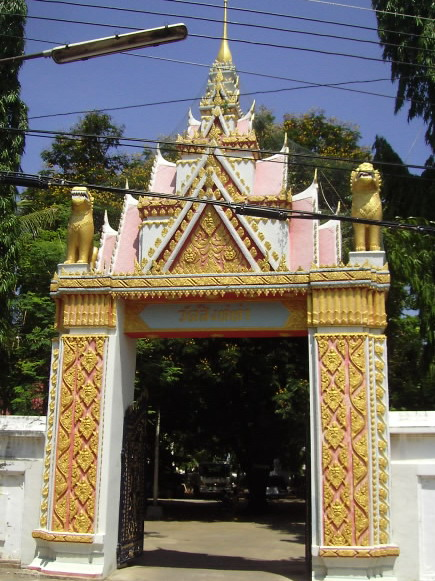
Wat Singh Tha Lion Gate

A marker for a chedi erected by Wat Singh Tha says that, during the Thonburi Period, grandson Kham Su (ท้าวคำสู) called the settlement Ban Singh Thong (บ้านสิงห์ทอง Ban Gold Lion). The wat, which had been deserted with dense jungle blocking the way to the river landing, was re-built and renamed after the new village. The change from thong ('gold') to tha (ท่า) was influenced by two factors: tha means 'port' or 'landing' and also means 'pose' with many connotations. Thus the change in name to Singh Tha means 'port lion' and also 'imposing lion' such as those posed on the Lion Gate, and on pedestals on the temple grounds.

In 1814, King Rama II renamed Ban Singh Tha to Yasothon and raised its status to mueang.

Yasothon was the national winner of the World Wildlife Fund's 2018 "One Planet City Challenge". The municipality was lauded for its efforts to curb greenhouse gas emissions, by means of recycling efforts and transport initiatives.

== Geography ==
Neighboring districts are (from the north clockwise) Sai Mun, Kut Chum, Pa Tio and Kham Khuean Kaeo of Yasothon Province; Phanom Phrai and Selaphum of Roi Et province.

== Administration ==
The district is divided into 18 sub-districts (tambons), which are further subdivided into 190 villages (muban). The town (thesaban mueang) Yasothon covers the entire tambon Nai Mueang. There are a further 17 tambon administrative organizations (TAO).

1. Nai Mueang (ในเมือง)
2. Nam Kham Yai (น้ำคำใหญ่)
3. Tat Thong (ตาดทอง)
4. Samran (สำราญ)
5. Kho Nuea (ค้อเหนือ)
6. Du Thung (ดู่ทุ่ง)
7. Doet (เดิด)
8. Khandai Yai (ขั้นไดใหญ่)
9. Thung Tae (ทุ่งแต้)
10. Sing (สิงห์)
11. Na Samai (นาสะไมย์)
12. Khueang Kham (เขื่องคำ)
13. Nong Hin (หนองหิน)
14. Nong Khu (หนองคู)
15. Khum Ngoen (ขุมเงิน)
16. Thung Nang Ok (ทุ่งนางโอก)
17. Nong Ruea (หนองเรือ)
18. Nong Pet (หนองเป็ด)

== Education ==
Private schools in Mueang Yasothon:

- Santitham Wittayakom Primary School — Baháʼí Faith (โรงเรียนสันติธรรมวิทยาคม — บาไฮ)

The secondary schools in Mueang Yasothon are:

- Yasothon Phitthayakhom School
- Yasothon Phitthayasan School

College in Mueang Yasothon

- Yasothon Technical College วิทยาลัยเทคนิคยโสธร

== Military ==
Camp Bodindecha (ค่ายบดินทรเดชา) is west of the city proper in Ban Doet (บ้านเดิด) Tambon Doet, on Route 23 (Chaeng Sanit Road ถนนแจ้งสนิท). The camp has been home to the Royal Thai Army 16th Infantry Regiment (กรมทหารราบที่ ๑๖) since 23 December 1985.
