= Amnat Charoen =

Amnat Charoen อำนาจเจริญ
- Town
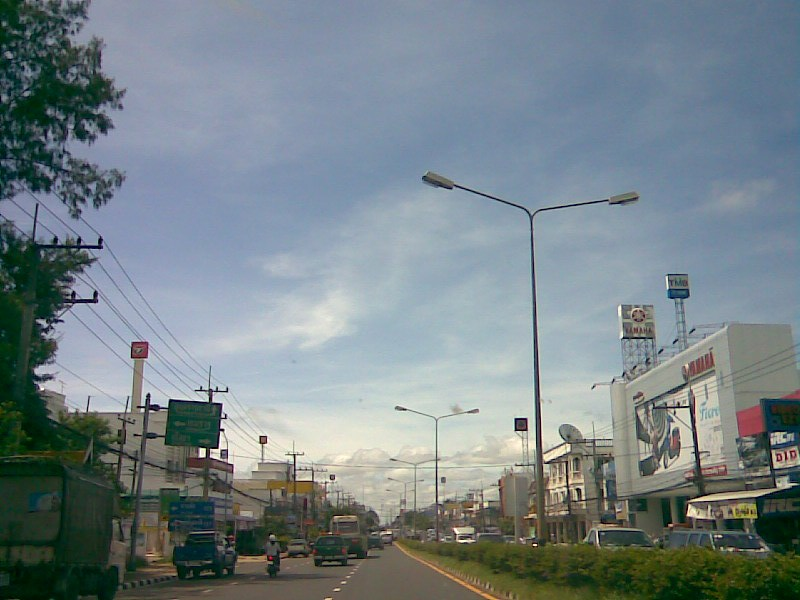
- Downtown of Amnat Charoen

- Location in Thailand
- Coordinates: 15°51′N 104°38′E
- Country: Thailand
- Province: Amnat Charoen Province
- District: Mueang Amnat Charoen district

Area
  - Total: 15 sq mi (38 km^{2})

Population (2009)
  - Total: 26,118
- Time zone: UTC+7 (ICT)
- Website: http://amnatmu.go.th/

Amnat Charoen (Thai: อำนาจเจริญ, pronounced [ʔām.nâːt t͡ɕā.rɤ̄ːn]) is a town in Thailand, the capital of Amnat Charoen Province. It occupies parts of the sub-district Bung of Mueang Amnat Charoen District. The town is 590 km east-northeast of Bangkok.
