= Kham Khuean Kaeo district =

Kham Khuean Kaeo คำเขื่อนแก้ว
- District
- District location in Yasothon province
- Coordinates: 15°39′11″N 104°18′32″E
- Country: Thailand
- Province: Yasothon
- Seat: Lumphuk

Area
  - Total: 638.40 km^{2} (246.49 sq mi)

Population (2008)
  - Total: 68,606
  - Density: 109.85/km^{2} (284.5/sq mi)
- Time zone: UTC+7 (ICT)
- Postal code: 35110
- Geocode: 3504

Kham Khuean Kaeo (Thai: คำเขื่อนแก้ว, pronounced [kʰām kʰɯ̀an kɛ̂ːw]; Northeastern Thai: คำเขื่อนแก้ว, pronounced [kʰâm kʰɯ̄an kɛ̂ːw]) is a district (amphoe) of Yasothon province in northeastern Thailand.

== History ==
In 1917, the district was renamed Lumphuk after its central sub-district. In 1953 it was returned to its original name, Kham Khuean Kaeo.

When Yasothon was separated from Ubon Ratchathani province, Kham Khuean Kaeo was one of the districts which was assigned to the new province.

== Geography ==
Neighboring districts are (from the northwest clockwise): Mueang Yasothon and Pa Tio of Yasothon Province; Hua Taphan of Amnat Charoen province; Khueang Nai of Ubon Ratchathani province; Maha Chana Chai of Yasothon Province; and Phanom Phrai of Roi Et province.

== Administration ==
The district is divided into 13 sub-districts (tambons) which make up 115 villages (mubans). Kham Khuean Kaeo is a sub-district municipality (thesaban tambon) which covers parts of the sub-district Lumphuk. Each of the sub-districts have a tambon administrative organization (TAO).

No.	Name	Thai	Villages	Pop.
1.	Lumphuk	ลุมพุก	15	13,044
2.	Yo	ย่อ	11	6,579
3.	Song Pueai	สงเปือย	9	4,346
4.	Phon Than	โพนทัน	5	3,450
5.	Thung Mon	ทุ่งมน	9	6,032
6.	Na Kham	นาคำ	6	2,765
7.	Dong Khaen Yai	ดงแคนใหญ่	13	7,904
8.	Ku Chan	กู่จาน	12	5,952
9.	Na Kae	นาแก	8	3,624
10.	Kut Kung	กุดกุง	7	4,657
11.	Lao Hai	เหล่าไฮ	6	2,960
12.	Khaen Noi	แคนน้อย	7	3,615
13.	Dong Charoen	ดงเจริญ	7	3,678
