= Yasothon province =

Coordinates: 15°48′8″N 104°8′23″E

Yasothon ยโสธร
- Province
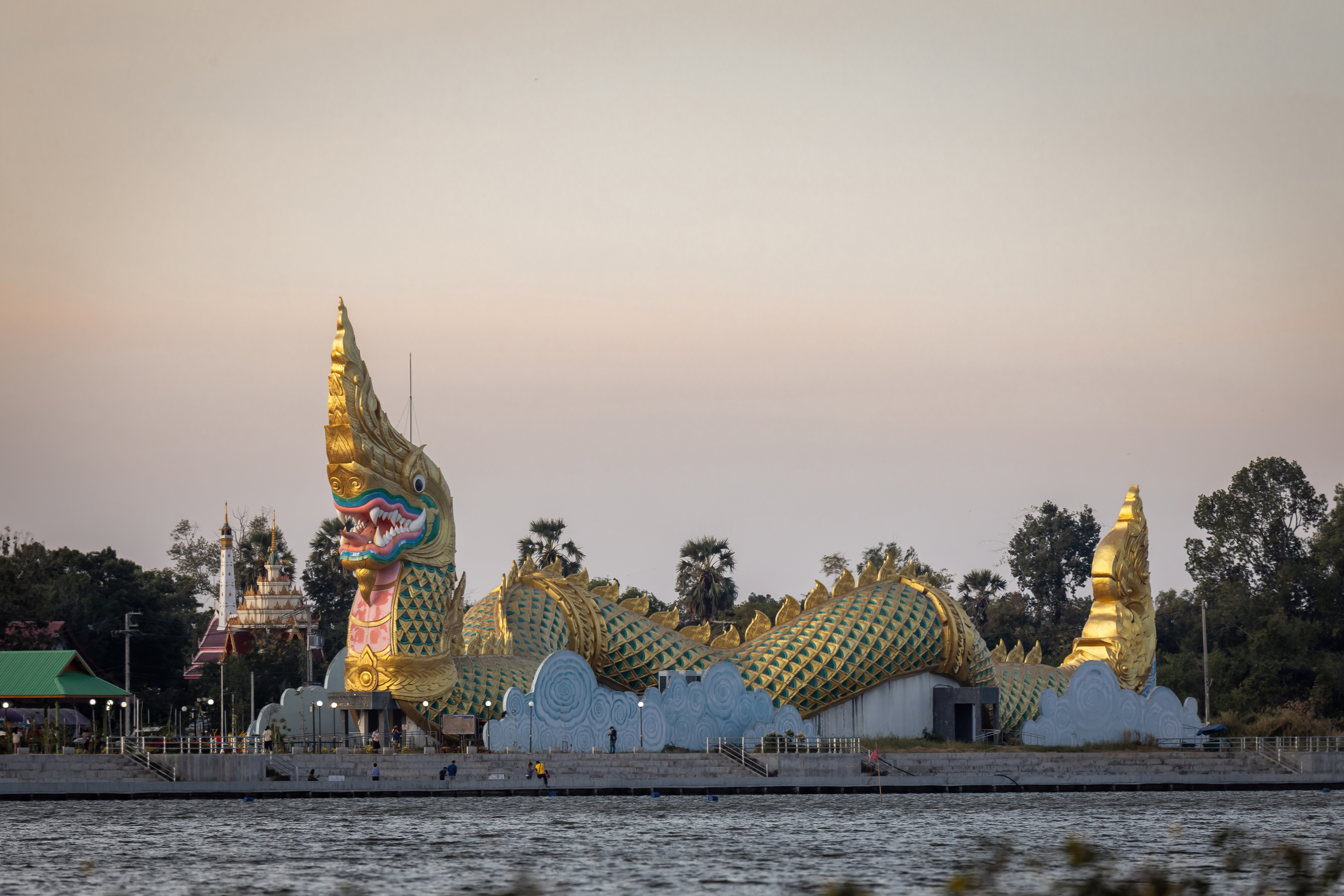
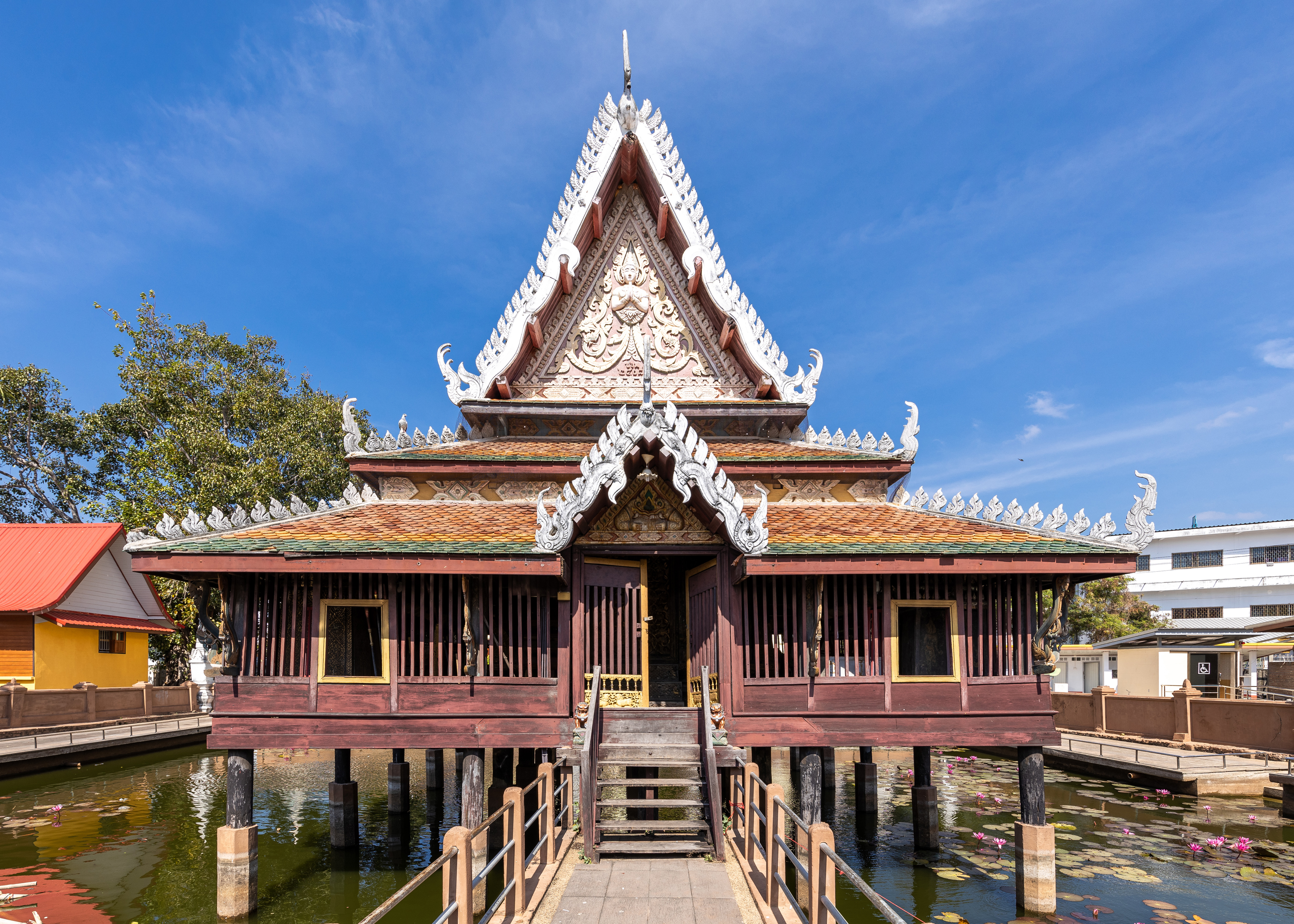
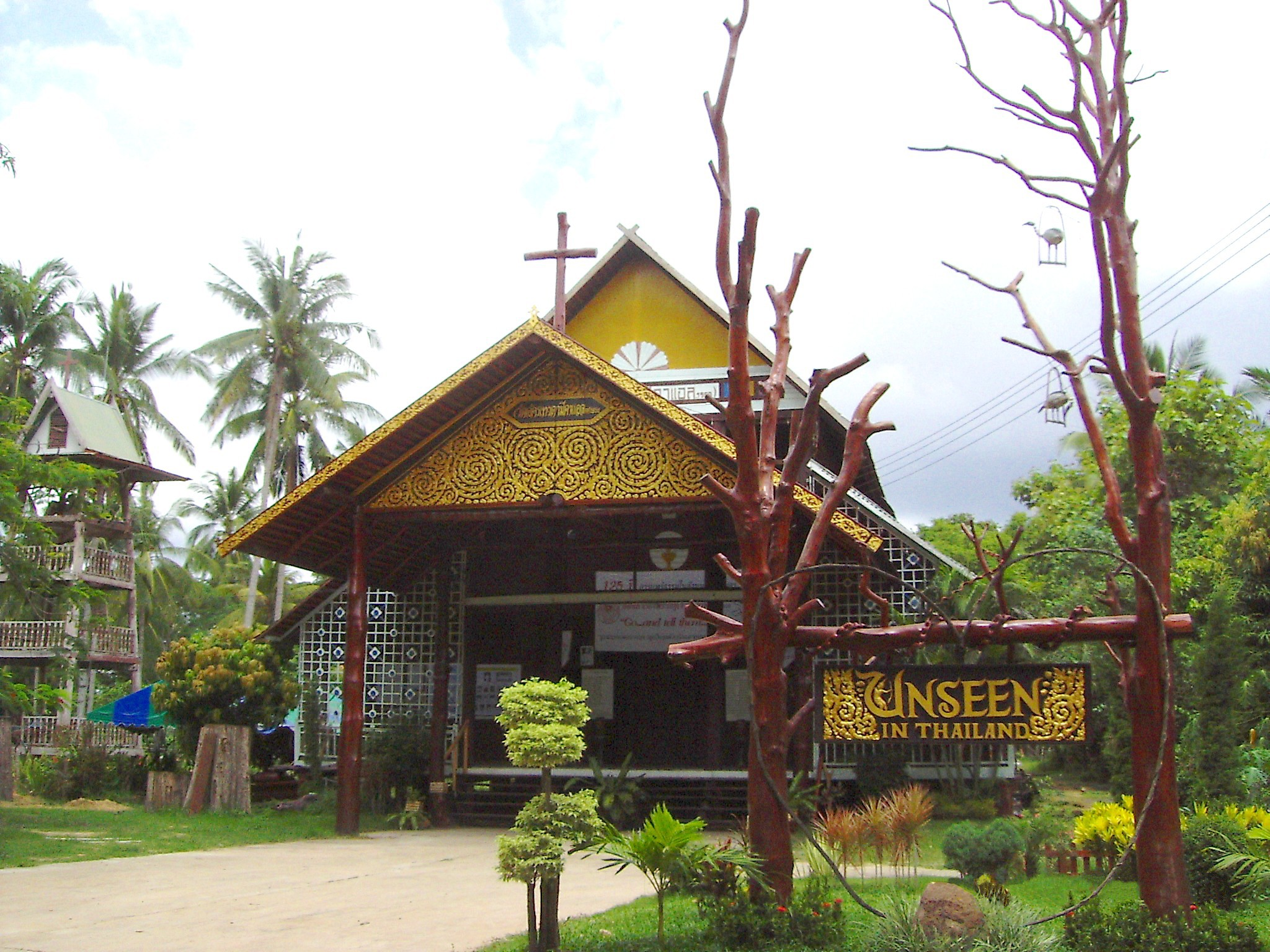
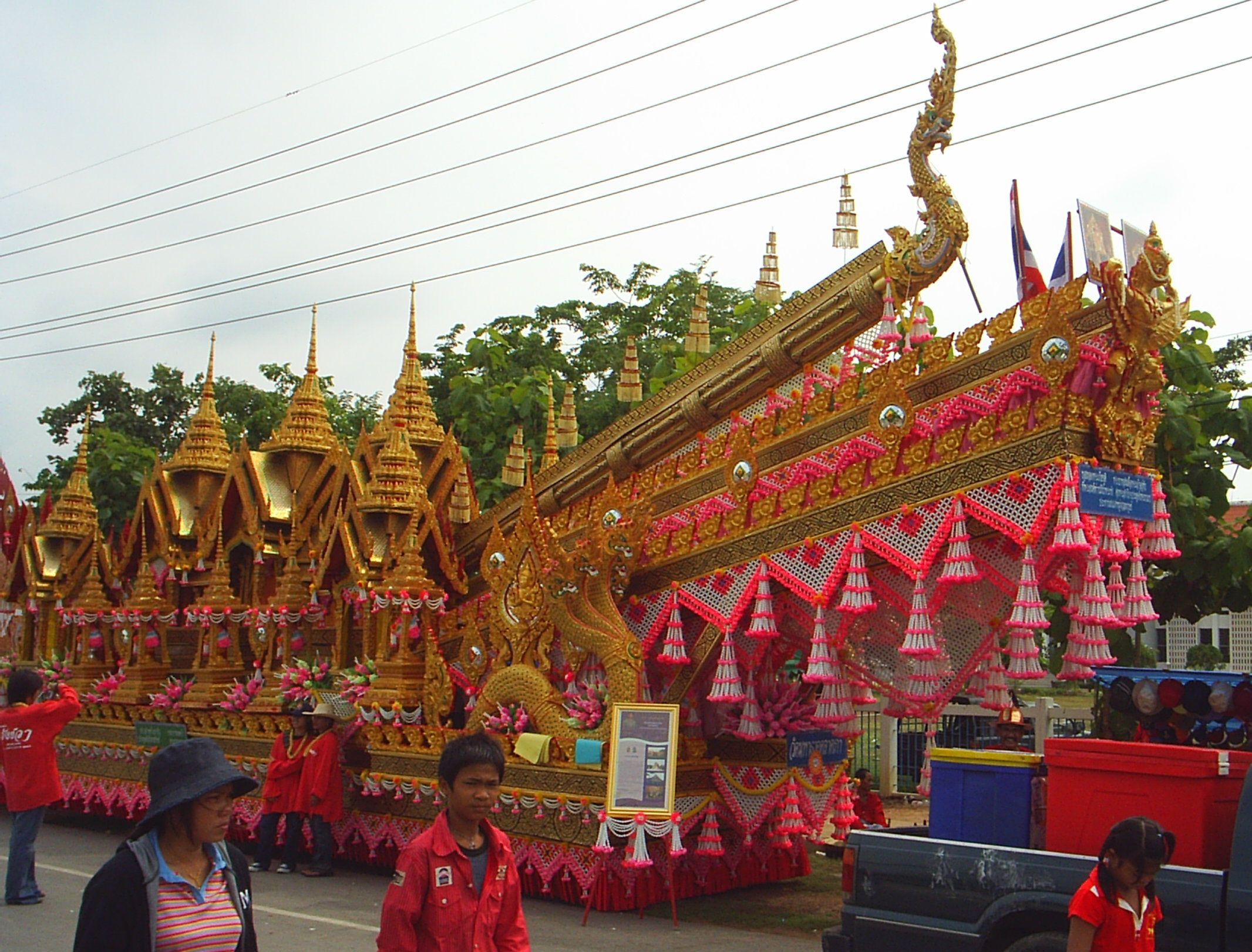
- From left to right, top to bottom : Naga building at Vimarn Phaya Thean, Phra That Kuchan, Wat Maha That, St Michael's Church, Songyae, Phra That Kong Khao Noi, Rocket Festival

- Flag Seal
- Nickname: Mueang Yot
- Motto: เมืองบั้งไฟโก้ แตงโมหวาน หมอนขวานผ้าขิด แหล่งผลิตข้าวหอมมะลิ ("Home of the amazing Bang Fai. Sweet watermelons. The mon khit pillows. Production source of white rice.")
- Map of Thailand highlighting Yasothon province
- Country: Thailand
- Capital: Yasothon

Government
  - Governor: Chanchai Sornsriwichai

Area
  - Total: 4,131 km^{2} (1,595 sq mi)
  - Rank: 52nd

Population (2024)
  - Total: ▼525,325
  - Rank: 49th
  - Density: 127/km^{2} (330/sq mi)
  - Rank: 34th

Human Achievement Index
  - HAI (2022): 0.6485 "somewhat high" Ranked 28th

GDP
  - Total: baht 26 billion (US$0.9 billion) (2019)
- Time zone: UTC+7 (ICT)
- Postal code: 35xxx
- Calling code: 045
- ISO 3166 code: TH-35
- Website: yasothon.go.th

Yasothon Provincial Administrative Organization องค์การบริหารส่วนจังหวัดยโสธร
- Provincial Administrative Organization
- Interactive map of Yasothon Provincial Administrative Organization

Government
  - Type: Local administrative divisions
  - Body: Yasothon Provincial Administrative Organization
  - President: Wichian Somwong
- Website: yst-pao.go.th

Yasothon province (Thai: ยโสธร, pronounced [já.sǒː.tʰɔ̄ːn], one of Thailand's seventy-six provinces (changwat), lies in central northeastern Thailand also called Isan. The province was established by the revolutionary council of Field Marshal Thanom Kittikachorn, after its Announcement No. 70 which came into force on 3 March 1972.

Neighboring provinces are (from north clockwise) Mukdahan, Amnat Charoen, Ubon Ratchathani, Sisaket, and Roi Et.

== Geography ==
The northern half of the province consists of plains with low hills; the southern part consists of the river lowlands of the River Chi, with ponds and swamps. Yasothon's total forested area is 358 km^{2} (138 sq mi) or 8.7% of the province.

=== Geology ===
Yasothon soils (rhodic ferralsols) formed in the Triassic before the uplift of the Khorat Plateau, are relict soils made fertile by field termites through bioturbation.

=== National park ===
There is one national park, along with five other national parks, make up region 9 (Ubon Ratchathani) of Thailand's protected areas. (Visitors in fiscal year 2024)

Phu Sa Dok Bua National Park	231 km^{2} (89 sq mi)	(8,840)

== History ==
The moated town of Dong Mueang Toei in Kham Khuean Kaeo district carries an inscription naming the place Śaṅkhapura. Chaowanee Lekkla places it about 400 km from Sambor Prei Kuk by the Chi, contemporary with that centre and working its own iron. She states that the evidence is not sufficient to place the town within Zhēnlà's area of political influence, and that a shared Shaiva cult does not establish one.

The province was created on 1 March 1972, when it was split off from Ubon Ratchathani.

== Symbols ==
The seal of the province shows two mythical lions, called singh, facing the chedi Prathat Anon, in the temple Wat Maha That in the city of Yasothon. In the legendary account of the founding of the city, a lion came out of the forest when the site was chosen; hence the city was called Ban Singh Tha (Thai: บ้านสิงห์ท่า), Home (of) Imposing Lion. At the bottom of the seal is a lotus flower (Nymphaea lotus), as the lotus is both the provincial flower of the province and of Ubon Ratchathani province, of which Yasothon was part until 1972. The provincial tree is Anisoptera costata. The provincial aquatic life is the sheatfish Ompok bimaculatus.

== Administrative divisions ==
Yasothon's nine districts

=== Provincial government ===
The province is divided into nine districts (amphoe). The districts are further subdivided into 78 subdistricts (tambon) and 885 villages (muban).

1. Mueang Yasothon
2. Sai Mun
3. Kut Chum
4. Kham Khuean Kaeo
5. Pa Tio
6. Maha Chana Chai
7. Kho Wang
8. Loeng Nok Tha
9. Thai Charoen

=== Local government ===
As of 26 November 2019 there are: one Yasothon Provincial Administration Organisation (ongkan borihan suan changwat) and 24 municipal (thesaban) areas in the province. Yasothon has town (thesaban mueang) status. Further 23 subdistrict municipalities (thesaban tambon). The non-municipal areas are administered by 63 Subdistrict Administrative Organisations - SAO (ongkan borihan suan tambon).

== Transport ==
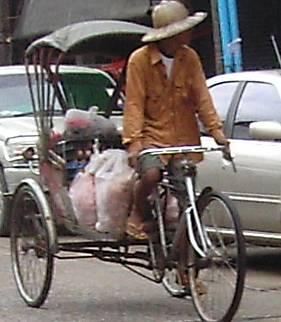
Samlor

Yasothon city is about 500 km (310 mi) from Bangkok at the intersection of Routes 23 and 202, and the south end of Route 2169. Several bus lines connect the province at frequent intervals to Bangkok's Northern Bus Terminal (Thai: หมอชิดใหม่, RTGS: mo chit mai), as well as all bus terminals in the north and northeast. Ubon Ratchathani province is 100 kilometres east on Route 23.

== Human achievement index 2022 ==
Health	Education	Employment	Income
50	6	44	54
Housing	Family	Transport	Participation
13	36	36	38
Yasothon, with an HAI 2022 value of 0.6485 is "somewhat high", occupies place 28 in the ranking.

Since 2003, the United Nations Development Programme (UNDP) in Thailand has tracked progress on human development at the provincial level using the Human Achievement Index (HAI), a composite index covering eight key areas of human development. The National Economic and Social Development Board (NESDB) has taken over this task since 2017.

Rank	Classification
1 - 13	"high"
14 - 29	"somewhat high"
30 - 45	"average"
46 - 61	"somewhat low"
62 - 77	"low"

Map with provinces and HAI 2022 rankings
