= List of tambon in Thailand (T) =

This is a list of tambon (sub-districts) in Thailand, beginning with the letter T. This information is liable to change due to border changes or reallocation.

| Tambon (sub-district) | ตำบล | Amphoe (district) | อำเภอ | Changwat (province) | จังหวัด | Region |
|---|---|---|---|---|---|---|
| Ta | ต้า | Khun Tan | ขุนตาล | Chiang Rai | เชียงราย | North |
| Ta Bai | ตะบ่าย | Si Mueang Mai | ศรีเมืองใหม่ | Ubon Ratchathani | อุบลราชธานี | North-East |
| Ta Bao | ตาเบา | Prasat | ปราสาท | Surin | สุรินทร์ | North-East |
| Ta Chan | ตาจั่น | Khong | คง | Nakhon Ratchasima | นครราชสีมา | North-East |
| Ta Chong | ตาจง | Lahan Sai | ละหานทราย | Buriram | บุรีรัมย์ | North-East |
| Ta Kao | ตาเกา | Nam Khun | น้ำขุ่น | Ubon Ratchathani | อุบลราชธานี | North-East |
| Ta Ket | ตาเกษ | Uthumphon Phisai | อุทุมพรพิสัย | Sisaket | ศรีสะเกษ | North-East |
| Ta Khan | ตาขัน | Ban Khai | บ้านค่าย | Rayong | ระยอง | East |
| Ta Khit | ตาขีด | Banphot Phisai | บรรพตพิสัย | Nakhon Sawan | นครสวรรค์ | Central |
| Ta Khong | ตาคง | Sangkha | สังขะ | Surin | สุรินทร์ | North-East |
| Ta Kong | ตาก้อง | Mueang Nakhon Pathom | เมืองนครปฐม | Nakhon Pathom | นครปฐม | Central |
| Ta Kuk | ตากูก | Khwao Sinarin | เขวาสินรินทร์ | Surin | สุรินทร์ | North-East |
| Ta Lang Nai | ตาหลังใน | Wang Nam Yen | วังน้ำเย็น | Sa Kaeo | สระแก้ว | East |
| Ta Luang | ตาหลวง | Damnoen Saduak | ดำเนินสะดวก | Ratchaburi | ราชบุรี | West |
| Ta Miang | ตาเมียง | Phanom Dong Rak | พนมดงรัก | Surin | สุรินทร์ | North-East |
| Ta Noen | ตาเนิน | Noen Sa-nga | เนินสง่า | Chaiyaphum | ชัยภูมิ | North-East |
| Ta Ong | ตาอ็อง | Mueang Surin | เมืองสุรินทร์ | Surin | สุรินทร์ | North-East |
| Ta Pek | ตาเป๊ก | Chaloem Phra Kiat | เฉลิมพระเกียรติ | Buriram | บุรีรัมย์ | North-East |
| Ta Pha Mok | ต้าผามอก | Long | ลอง | Phrae | แพร่ | North |
| Ta Phraya | ตาพระยา | Ta Phraya | ตาพระยา | Sa Kaeo | สระแก้ว | East |
| Ta Sang | ตาสัง | Banphot Phisai | บรรพตพิสัย | Nakhon Sawan | นครสวรรค์ | Central |
| Ta Sao | ตาเสา | Huai Rat | ห้วยราช | Buriram | บุรีรัมย์ | North-East |
| Ta Sit | ตาสิทธิ์ | Pluak Daeng | ปลวกแดง | Rayong | ระยอง | East |
| Ta Tum | ตาตุม | Sangkha | สังขะ | Surin | สุรินทร์ | North-East |
| Ta Ut | ตาอุด | Khukhan | ขุขันธ์ | Sisaket | ศรีสะเกษ | North-East |
| Ta Wang | ตาวัง | Buachet | บัวเชด | Surin | สุรินทร์ | North-East |
| Tabaek Ban | ตะแบกบาน | Khon Buri | ครบุรี | Nakhon Ratchasima | นครราชสีมา | North-East |
| Tabing | ตะบิ้ง | Sai Buri (Malay: Telube or Selindung Bayu) | สายบุรี | Pattani | ปัตตานี | South |
| Tabo | ตะเบาะ | Mueang Phetchabun | เมืองเพชรบูรณ์ | Phetchabun | เพชรบูรณ์ | Central |
| Tachi | ตาชี | Yaha | ยะหา | Yala | ยะลา | South |
| Tadop | ตะดอบ | Mueang Sisaket | เมืองศรีสะเกษ | Sisaket | ศรีสะเกษ | North-East |
| Tae | แต้ | Uthumphon Phisai | อุทุมพรพิสัย | Sisaket | ศรีสะเกษ | North-East |
| Taen | แตล | Sikhoraphum | ศีขรภูมิ | Surin | สุรินทร์ | North-East |
| Tak Daet | ตากแดด | Trakan Phuet Phon | ตระการพืชผล | Ubon Ratchathani | อุบลราชธานี | North-East |
| Tak Daet | ตากแดด | Mueang Phang Nga | เมืองพังงา | Phang Nga | พังงา | South |
| Tak Daet | ตากแดด | Mueang Chumphon | เมืองชุมพร | Chumphon | ชุมพร | South |
| Tak Fa | ตากฟ้า | Tak Fa | ตากฟ้า | Nakhon Sawan | นครสวรรค์ | Central |
| Tak Ok | ตากออก | Ban Tak | บ้านตาก | Tak | ตาก | West |
| Tak Tok | ตากตก | Ban Tak | บ้านตาก | Tak | ตาก | West |
| Ta Kae | ตาแกะ | Yaring (Malay: Jamu) | ยะหริ่ง | Pattani | ปัตตานี | South |
| Takang | ตะกาง | Mueang Trat | เมืองตราด | Trat | ตราด | East |
| Takat Ngao | ตะกาดเง้า | Tha Mai | ท่าใหม่ | Chanthaburi | จันทบุรี | East |
| Takha | ตะค่า | Bang Pla Ma | บางปลาม้า | Suphan Buri | สุพรรณบุรี | Central |
| Takhian | ตะเคียน | Kap Choeng | กาบเชิง | Surin | สุรินทร์ | North-East |
| Takhian | ตะเคียน | Khukhan | ขุขันธ์ | Sisaket | ศรีสะเกษ | North-East |
| Takhian | ตะเคียน | Dan Khun Thot | ด่านขุนทด | Nakhon Ratchasima | นครราชสีมา | North-East |
| Takhian Luean | ตะเคียนเลื่อน | Mueang Nakhon Sawan | เมืองนครสวรรค์ | Nakhon Sawan | นครสวรรค์ | Central |
| Takhian Pom | ตะเคียนปม | Thung Hua Chang | ทุ่งหัวช้าง | Lamphun | ลำพูน | North |
| Takhian Ram | ตะเคียนราม | Benchalak | เบญจลักษ์ | Sisaket | ศรีสะเกษ | North-East |
| Takhian Ram | ตะเคียนราม | Phu Sing | ภูสิงห์ | Sisaket | ศรีสะเกษ | North-East |
| Takhian Thong | ตะเคียนทอง | Khao Khitchakut | เขาคิชฌกูฏ | Chanthaburi | จันทบุรี | East |
| Takhian Tia | ตะเคียนเตี้ย | Bang Lamung | บางละมุง | Chonburi | ชลบุรี | East |
| Takhli | ตาคลี | Takhli | ตาคลี | Nakhon Sawan | นครสวรรค์ | Central |
| Takhop | ตะขบ | Pak Thong Chai | ปักธงชัย | Nakhon Ratchasima | นครราชสีมา | North-East |
| Takhram En | ตะคร้ำเอน | Tha Maka | ท่ามะกา | Kanchanaburi | กาญจนบุรี | West |
| Takhria | ตะเครียะ | Ranot (Malay: Renut) | ระโนด | Songkhla | สงขลา | South |
| Takhro | ตะคร้อ | Phaisali | ไพศาลี | Nakhon Sawan | นครสวรรค์ | Central |
| Takhu | ตะคุ | Pak Thong Chai | ปักธงชัย | Nakhon Ratchasima | นครราชสีมา | North-East |
| Takian Thong | ตะเคียนทอง | Kanchanadit | กาญจนดิษฐ์ | Surat Thani | สุราษฎร์ธานี | South |
| Tako | ตะโก | Huai Thalaeng | ห้วยแถลง | Nakhon Ratchasima | นครราชสีมา | North-East |
| Tako | ตะโก | Thung Tako | ทุ่งตะโก | Chumphon | ชุมพร | South |
| Tako Taphi | ตะโกตาพิ | Prakhon Chai | ประโคนชัย | Buriram | บุรีรัมย์ | North-East |
| Tako Thong | ตะโกทอง | Sap Yai | ซับใหญ่ | Chaiyaphum | ชัยภูมิ | North-East |
| Takrop | ตะกรบ | Chaiya | ไชยา | Surat Thani | สุราษฎร์ธานี | South |
| Takua Pa | ตะกั่วป่า | Takua Pa | ตะกั่วป่า | Phang Nga | พังงา | South |
| Takua Pa | ตะกั่วป่า | Nong Song Hong | หนองสองห้อง | Khon Kaen | ขอนแก่น | North-East |
| Takuk Nuea | ตะกุกเหนือ | Vibhavadi | วิภาวดี | Surat Thani | สุราษฎร์ธานี | South |
| Takuk Tai | ตะกุกใต้ | Vibhavadi | วิภาวดี | Surat Thani | สุราษฎร์ธานี | South |
| Takut | ตะกุด | Mueang Saraburi | เมืองสระบุรี | Saraburi | สระบุรี | Central |
| Takut Rai | ตะกุดไร | Chon Daen | ชนแดน | Phetchabun | เพชรบูรณ์ | Central |
| Talan | ตาลาน | Phak Hai | ผักไห่ | Phra Nakhon Si Ayutthaya | พระนครศรีอยุธยา | Central |
| Talat | ตลาด | Mueang Nakhon Ratchasima | เมืองนครราชสีมา | Nakhon Ratchasima | นครราชสีมา | North-East |
| Talat | ตลาด | Mueang Chanthaburi | เมืองจันทบุรี | Chanthaburi | จันทบุรี | East |
| Talat | ตลาด | Phra Pradaeng | พระประแดง | Samut Prakan | สมุทรปราการ | Central |
| Talat | ตลาด | Mueang Surat Thani | เมืองสุราษฎร์ธานี | Surat Thani | สุราษฎร์ธานี | South |
| Talat | ตลาด | Mueang Maha Sarakham | เมืองมหาสารคาม | Maha Sarakham | มหาสารคาม | North-East |
| Talat Bang Khen | ตลาดบางเขน | Khet Lak Si | หลักสี่ | Bangkok | กรุงเทพมหานคร | Central |
| Talat Chaiya | ตลาดไชยา | Chaiya | ไชยา | Surat Thani | สุราษฎร์ธานี | South |
| Talat Chinda | ตลาดจินดา | Sam Phran | สามพราน | Nakhon Pathom | นครปฐม | Central |
| Talat Khwan | ตลาดขวัญ | Mueang Nonthaburi | เมืองนนทบุรี | Nonthaburi | นนทบุรี | Central |
| Talat Khwan | ตลาดขวัญ | Doi Saket | ดอยสะเก็ด | Chiang Mai | เชียงใหม่ | North |
| Talat Krathum Baen | ตลาดกระทุ่มแบน | Krathum Baen | กระทุ่มแบน | Samut Sakhon | สมุทรสาคร | Central |
| Talat Kriap | ตลาดเกรียบ | Bang Pa-in | บางปะอิน | Phra Nakhon Si Ayutthaya | พระนครศรีอยุธยา | Central |
| Talat Kruat | ตลาดกรวด | Mueang Ang Thong | เมืองอ่างทอง | Ang Thong | อ่างทอง | Central |
| Talat Luang | ตลาดหลวง | Mueang Ang Thong | เมืองอ่างทอง | Ang Thong | อ่างทอง | Central |
| Talat Mai | ตลาดใหม่ | Wiset Chai Chan | วิเศษชัยชาญ | Ang Thong | อ่างทอง | Central |
| Talat Noi | ตลาดน้อย | Khet Samphanthawong | สัมพันธวงศ์ | Bangkok | กรุงเทพมหานคร | Central |
| Talat Noi | ตลาดน้อย | Ban Mo | บ้านหมอ | Saraburi | สระบุรี | Central |
| Talat Nuea | ตลาดเหนือ | Mueang Phuket | เมืองภูเก็ต | Phuket | ภูเก็ต | South |
| Talat Phlu | ตลาดพลู | Khet Thon Buri | ธนบุรี | Bangkok | กรุงเทพมหานคร | Central |
| Talat Pho | ตลาดโพธิ์ | Lam Plai Mat | ลำปลายมาศ | Buriram | บุรีรัมย์ | North-East |
| Talat Raeng | ตลาดแร้ง | Ban Khwao | บ้านเขว้า | Chaiyaphum | ชัยภูมิ | North-East |
| Talat Sai | ตลาดไทร | Chum Phuang | ชุมพวง | Nakhon Ratchasima | นครราชสีมา | North-East |
| Talat Sai | ตลาดไทร | Prathai | ประทาย | Nakhon Ratchasima | นครราชสีมา | North-East |
| Talat Yai | ตลาดใหญ่ | Mueang Phuket | เมืองภูเก็ต | Phuket | ภูเก็ต | South |
| Talat Yai | ตลาดใหญ่ | Doi Saket | ดอยสะเก็ด | Chiang Mai | เชียงใหม่ | North |
| Talat Yot | ตลาดยอด | Khet Phra Nakhon | พระนคร | Bangkok | กรุงเทพมหานคร | Central |
| Tali-ai | ตาลีอายร์ | Yaring (Malay: Jamu) | ยะหริ่ง | Pattani | ปัตตานี | South |
| Taling Chan | ตลิ่งชัน | Khet Taling Chan | ตลิ่งชัน | Bangkok | กรุงเทพมหานคร | Central |
| Taling Chan | ตลิ่งชัน | Tha Sala | ท่าศาลา | Nakhon Si Thammarat | นครศรีธรรมราช | South |
| Taling Chan | ตลิ่งชัน | Mueang Saraburi | เมืองสระบุรี | Saraburi | สระบุรี | Central |
| Taling Chan | ตลิ่งชัน | Mueang Suphanburi | เมืองสุพรรณบุรี | Suphan Buri | สุพรรณบุรี | Central |
| Taling Chan | ตลิ่งชัน | Chana (Malay: Chenok) | จะนะ | Songkhla | สงขลา | South |
| Taling Chan | ตลิ่งชัน | Ban Dan Lan Hoi | บ้านด่านลานหอย | Sukhothai | สุโขทัย | Central |
| Taling Chan | ตลิ่งชัน | Bang Pa-in | บางปะอิน | Phra Nakhon Si Ayutthaya | พระนครศรีอยุธยา | Central |
| Taling Chan | ตลิ่งชัน | Bannang Sata (Malay: Benang Setar) | บันนังสตา | Yala | ยะลา | South |
| Taling Chan | ตลิ่งชัน | Nuea Khlong | เหนือคลอง | Krabi | กระบี่ | South |
| Taling Ngam | ตลิ่งงาม | Ko Samui | เกาะสมุย | Surat Thani | สุราษฎร์ธานี | South |
| Talo | ตะโละ | Yaring (Malay: Jamu) | ยะหริ่ง | Pattani | ปัตตานี | South |
| Talo Due Raman | ตะโละดือรามัน | Kapho | กะพ้อ | Pattani | ปัตตานี | South |
| Talo Halo | ตะโล๊ะหะลอ | Raman (Malay: Reman) | รามัน | Yala | ยะลา | South |
| Talo Kapo | ตะโละกาโปร์ | Yaring (Malay: Jamu) | ยะหริ่ง | Pattani | ปัตตานี | South |
| Talo Krai Thong | ตะโละไกรทอง | Mai Kaen | ไม้แก่น | Pattani | ปัตตานี | South |
| Talo Mae Na | ตะโละแมะนา | Thung Yang Daeng | ทุ่งยางแดง | Pattani | ปัตตานี | South |
| Taluban | ตะลุบัน | Sai Buri (Malay: Telube or Selindung Bayu) | สายบุรี | Pattani | ปัตตานี | South |
| Talubo | ตะลุโบะ | Mueang Pattani (Malay: Patani) | เมืองปัตตานี | Pattani | ปัตตานี | South |
| Taluk | ตลุก | Sapphaya | สรรพยา | Chai Nat | ชัยนาท | Central |
| Taluk Du | ตลุกดู่ | Thap Than | ทัพทัน | Uthai Thani | อุทัยธานี | Central |
| Taluk Klang Thung | ตลุกกลางทุ่ง | Mueang Tak | เมืองตาก | Tak | ตาก | West |
| Taluk Thiam | ตลุกเทียม | Phrom Phiram | พรหมพิราม | Phitsanulok | พิษณุโลก | Central |
| Talung | ตะลุง | Mueang Lopburi | เมืองลพบุรี | Lopburi | ลพบุรี | Central |
| Tam Malang | ตำมะลัง | Mueang Satun (Malay: Mambang) | เมืองสตูล | Satun | สตูล | South |
| Tam Tua | ตำตัว | Takua Pa | ตะกั่วป่า | Phang Nga | พังงา | South |
| Tamayung | ตะมะยูง | Si Sakhon | ศรีสาคร | Narathiwat | นราธิวาส | South |
| Tamnak Tham | ตำหนักธรรม | Nong Muang Khai | หนองม่วงไข่ | Phrae | แพร่ | North |
| Tamnan | ตำนาน | Mueang Phatthalung | เมืองพัทลุง | Phatthalung | พัทลุง | South |
| Tamot | ตะโหมด | Tamot | ตะโหมด | Phatthalung | พัทลุง | South |
| Tamru | ตำหรุ | Ban Lat | บ้านลาด | Phetchaburi | เพชรบุรี | West |
| Tamyae | ตำแย | Phayu | พยุห์ | Sisaket | ศรีสะเกษ | North-East |
| Tan Chum | ตาลชุม | Wiang Sa | เวียงสา | Nan | น่าน | North |
| Tan Chum | ตาลชุม | Tha Wang Pha | ท่าวังผา | Nan | น่าน | North |
| Tan Diao | ตาลเดี่ยว | Lom Sak | หล่มสัก | Phetchabun | เพชรบูรณ์ | Central |
| Tan Diao | ตาลเดี่ยว | Kaeng Khoi | แก่งคอย | Saraburi | สระบุรี | Central |
| Tan Kon | ตาลโกน | Sawang Daen Din | สว่างแดนดิน | Sakon Nakhon | สกลนคร | North-East |
| Tan Lian | ตาลเลียน | Kut Chap | กุดจับ | Udon Thani | อุดรธานี | North-East |
| Tan Noeng | ตาลเนิ้ง | Sawang Daen Din | สว่างแดนดิน | Sakon Nakhon | สกลนคร | North-East |
| Tan Sum | ตาลสุม | Tan Sum | ตาลสุม | Ubon Ratchathani | อุบลราชธานี | North-East |
| Tan Tia | ตาลเตี้ย | Mueang Sukhothai | เมืองสุโขทัย | Sukhothai | สุโขทัย | Central |
| Tang Chai | ตั้งใจ | Mueang Surin | เมืองสุรินทร์ | Surin | สุรินทร์ | North-East |
| Tani | ตานี | Prasat | ปราสาท | Surin | สุรินทร์ | North-East |
| Tano Maero | ตาเนาะแมเราะ | Betong (Malay: Betung) | เบตง | Yala | ยะลา | South |
| Tano Pute | ตาเนาะปูเต๊ะ | Bannang Sata (Malay: Benang Setar) | บันนังสตา | Yala | ยะลา | South |
| Tanot | โตนด | Khiri Mat | คีรีมาศ | Sukhothai | สุโขทัย | Central |
| Tanot | โตนด | Non Sung | โนนสูง | Nakhon Ratchasima | นครราชสีมา | North-East |
| Tanot Duan | โตนดด้วน | Khuan Khanun | ควนขนุน | Phatthalung | พัทลุง | South |
| Tanyong Chueng-nga | ตันหยงจึงงา | Yaring (Malay: Jamu) | ยะหริ่ง | Pattani | ปัตตานี | South |
| Tanyong Limo | ตันหยงลิมอ | Ra-ngae | ระแงะ | Narathiwat | นราธิวาส | South |
| Tanyong Lulo | ตันหยงลุโละ | Mueang Pattani (Malay: Patani) | เมืองปัตตานี | Pattani | ปัตตานี | South |
| Tanyong Mat | ตันหยงมัส | Ra-ngae | ระแงะ | Narathiwat | นราธิวาส | South |
| Tanyong Po | ตันหยงโป | Mueang Satun (Malay: Mambang) | เมืองสตูล | Satun | สตูล | South |
| Tanyong Dalo | ตันหยงดาลอ | Yaring (Malay: Jamu) | ยะหริ่ง | Pattani | ปัตตานี | South |
| Tao Hai | เตาไห | Phen | เพ็ญ | Udon Thani | อุดรธานี | North-East |
| Tao Lao | เต่าเล่า | Bang Sai | บางซ้าย | Phra Nakhon Si Ayutthaya | พระนครศรีอยุธยา | Central |
| Tao Ngoi | เต่างอย | Tao Ngoi | เต่างอย | Sakon Nakhon | สกลนคร | North-East |
| Tao Pun | เตาปูน | Kaeng Khoi | แก่งคอย | Saraburi | สระบุรี | Central |
| Tao Pun | เตาปูน | Photharam | โพธาราม | Ratchaburi | ราชบุรี | West |
| Tao Pun | เตาปูน | Song | สอง | Phrae | แพร่ | North |
| Tap Tao | ตับเต่า | Thoeng | เทิง | Chiang Rai | เชียงราย | North |
| Tapan | ตะปาน | Phunphin | พุนพิน | Surat Thani | สุราษฎร์ธานี | South |
| Taphaen | ตะแพน | Si Banphot | ศรีบรรพต | Phatthalung | พัทลุง | South |
| Taphan Hin | ตะพานหิน | Taphan Hin | ตะพานหิน | Phichit | พิจิตร | Central |
| Taphong | ตะพง | Mueang Rayong | เมืองระยอง | Rayong | ระยอง | East |
| Tapiang Tia | ตระเปียงเตีย | Lamduan | ลำดวน | Surin | สุรินทร์ | North-East |
| Tapon | ตะปอน | Khlung | ขลุง | Chanthaburi | จันทบุรี | East |
| Tapoyo | ตะปอเยาะ | Yi-ngo (Malay: Jeringo) | ยี่งอ | Narathiwat | นราธิวาส | South |
| Tase | ตะเสะ | Hat Samran | หาดสำราญ | Trang | ตรัง | South |
| Tase | ตาเซะ | Mueang Yala | เมืองยะลา | Yala | ยะลา | South |
| Tat Kha | ตาดข่า | Nong Hin | หนองหิน | Loei | เลย | North-East |
| Tat Khwan | ตาดควัน | Phaya Mengrai | พญาเม็งราย | Chiang Rai | เชียงราย | North |
| Tat Kloi | ตาดกลอย | Lom Kao | หล่มเก่า | Phetchabun | เพชรบูรณ์ | Central |
| Tat Thong | ตาดทอง | Si That | ศรีธาตุ | Udon Thani | อุดรธานี | North-East |
| Tha Ang | ท่าอ่าง | Chok Chai | โชคชัย | Nakhon Ratchasima | นครราชสีมา | North-East |
| Tha Bo Songkhram | ท่าบ่อสงคราม | Si Songkhram | ศรีสงคราม | Nakhon Phanom | นครพนม | North-East |
| Tha Bo | ท่าบ่อ | Tha Bo | ท่าบ่อ | Nong Khai | หนองคาย | North-East |
| Tha Bon | ท่าบอน | Ranot (Malay: Renut) | ระโนด | Songkhla | สงขลา | South |
| Tha Bua | ท่าบัว | Pho Thale | โพทะเล | Phichit | พิจิตร | Central |
| Tha Bun Mi | ท่าบุญมี | Ko Chan | เกาะจันทร์ | Chonburi | ชลบุรี | East |
| Tha Chai | ท่าชัย | Mueang Chai Nat | เมืองชัยนาท | Chai Nat | ชัยนาท | Central |
| Tha Chai | ท่าชัย | Si Satchanalai | ศรีสัชนาลัย | Sukhothai | สุโขทัย | Central |
| Tha Chalom | ท่าฉลอม | Mueang Samut Sakhon | เมืองสมุทรสาคร | Samut Sakhon | สมุทรสาคร | Central |
| Tha Chalung | ท่าจะหลุง | Chok Chai | โชคชัย | Nakhon Ratchasima | นครราชสีมา | North-East |
| Tha Champa | ท่าจำปา | Tha Uthen | ท่าอุเทน | Nakhon Phanom | นครพนม | North-East |
| Tha Champi | ท่าจำปี | Mueang Phayao | เมืองพะเยา | Phayao | พะเยา | North |
| Tha Chamuang | ท่าชะมวง | Rattaphum | รัตภูมิ | Songkhla | สงขลา | South |
| Tha Chana | ท่าชนะ | Tha Chana | ท่าชนะ | Surat Thani | สุราษฎร์ธานี | South |
| Tha Chang | ท่าช้าง | Sao Hai | เสาไห้ | Saraburi | สระบุรี | Central |
| Tha Chang | ท่าช้าง | Sawang Wirawong | สว่างวีรวงศ์ | Ubon Ratchathani | อุบลราชธานี | North-East |
| Tha Chang | ท่าฉาง | Tha Chang | ท่าฉาง | Surat Thani | สุราษฎร์ธานี | South |
| Tha Chang | ท่าช้าง | Chaloem Phra Kiat | เฉลิมพระเกียรติ | Nakhon Ratchasima | นครราชสีมา | North-East |
| Tha Chang | ท่าช้าง | Ban Lat | บ้านลาด | Phetchaburi | เพชรบุรี | West |
| Tha Chang | ท่าช้าง | Mueang Nakhon Nayok | เมืองนครนายก | Nakhon Nayok | นครนายก | Central |
| Tha Chang | ท่าช้าง | Phrom Phiram | พรหมพิราม | Phitsanulok | พิษณุโลก | Central |
| Tha Chang | ท่าช้าง | Bang Klam | บางกล่ำ | Songkhla | สงขลา | South |
| Tha Chang | ท่าช้าง | Nakhon Luang | นครหลวง | Phra Nakhon Si Ayutthaya | พระนครศรีอยุธยา | Central |
| Tha Chang | ท่าช้าง | Wiset Chai Chan | วิเศษชัยชาญ | Ang Thong | อ่างทอง | Central |
| Tha Chang | ท่าช้าง | Mueang Chanthaburi | เมืองจันทบุรี | Chanthaburi | จันทบุรี | East |
| Tha Chang Khlong | ท่าช้างคล้อง | Pha Khao | ผาขาว | Loei | เลย | North-East |
| Tha Chanuan | ท่าฉนวน | Manorom | มโนรมย์ | Chai Nat | ชัยนาท | Central |
| Tha Chanuan | ท่าฉนวน | Kong Krailat | กงไกรลาศ | Sukhothai | สุโขทัย | Central |
| Tha Chao Sanuk | ท่าเจ้าสนุก | Tha Ruea | ท่าเรือ | Phra Nakhon Si Ayutthaya | พระนครศรีอยุธยา | Central |
| Tha Chi | ท่าชี | Ban Nà Sản | บ้านนาสาร | Surat Thani | สุราษฎร์ธานี | South |
| Tha Chin | ท่าจีน | Mueang Samut Sakhon | เมืองสมุทรสาคร | Samut Sakhon | สมุทรสาคร | Central |
| Tha Chumphon | ท่าชุมพล | Photharam | โพธาราม | Ratchaburi | ราชบุรี | West |
| Tha Daeng | ท่าแดง | Nong Phai | หนองไผ่ | Phetchabun | เพชรบูรณ์ | Central |
| Tha Di | ท่าดี | Lan Saka | ลานสกา | Nakhon Si Thammarat | นครศรีธรรมราช | South |
| Tha Din Daeng | ท่าดินแดง | Phak Hai | ผักไห่ | Phra Nakhon Si Ayutthaya | พระนครศรีอยุธยา | Central |
| Tha Din Dam | ท่าดินดำ | Chai Badan | ชัยบาดาล | Lopburi | ลพบุรี | Central |
| Tha Dok Kham | ท่าดอกคำ | Bueng Khong Long | บึงโขงหลง | Bueng Kan | บึงกาฬ | North-East |
| Tha Dok Kham | ท่าดอกคำ | Bueng Khong Long | บึงโขงหลง | Nong Khai | หนองคาย | North-East |
| Tha Duang | ท่าด้วง | Nong Phai | หนองไผ่ | Phetchabun | เพชรบูรณ์ | Central |
| Tha Duea | ท่าเดื่อ | Doi Tao | ดอยเต่า | Chiang Mai | เชียงใหม่ | North |
| Tha Faek | ท่าแฝก | Tha Pla | ท่าปลา | Uttaradit | อุตรดิตถ์ | North |
| Tha Hai | ท่าไห | Khueang Nai | เขื่องใน | Ubon Ratchathani | อุบลราชธานี | North-East |
| Tha Hat Yao | ท่าหาดยาว | Phon Sai | โพนทราย | Roi Et | ร้อยเอ็ด | North-East |
| Tha Hin | ท่าหิน | Mueang Lopburi | เมืองลพบุรี | Lopburi | ลพบุรี | Central |
| Tha Hin | ท่าหิน | Sawi | สวี | Chumphon | ชุมพร | South |
| Tha Hin | ท่าหิน | Sathing Phra | สทิงพระ | Songkhla | สงขลา | South |
| Tha Hin Ngom | ท่าหินโงม | Mueang Chaiyaphum | เมืองชัยภูมิ | Chaiyaphum | ชัยภูมิ | North-East |
| Tha Ibun | ท่าอิบุญ | Lom Sak | หล่มสัก | Phetchabun | เพชรบูรณ์ | Central |
| Tha It | ท่าอิฐ | Mueang Uttaradit | เมืองอุตรดิตถ์ | Uttaradit | อุตรดิตถ์ | North |
| Tha It | ท่าอิฐ | Pak Kret | ปากเกร็ด | Nonthaburi | นนทบุรี | Central |
| Tha Kamcham | ท่ากำชำ | Nong Chik | หนองจิก | Pattani | ปัตตานี | South |
| Tha Kasem | ท่าเกษม | Mueang Sa Kaeo | เมืองสระแก้ว | Sa Kaeo | สระแก้ว | East |
| Tha Kat | ทากาศ | Mae Tha | แม่ทะ | Lamphun | ลำพูน | North |
| Tha Kha | ท่าคา | Amphawa | อัมพวา | Samut Songkhram | สมุทรสงคราม | Central |
| Tha Khae | ท่าแค | Mueang Lopburi | เมืองลพบุรี | Lopburi | ลพบุรี | Central |
| Tha Khae | ท่าแค | Mueang Phatthalung | เมืองพัทลุง | Phatthalung | พัทลุง | South |
| Tha Khai | ท่าไข่ | Mueang Chachoengsao | เมืองฉะเชิงเทรา | Chachoengsao | ฉะเชิงเทรา | East |
| Tha Kham | ท่าข้าม | Hat Yai | หาดใหญ่ | Songkhla | สงขลา | South |
| Tha Kham | ท่าข้าม | Sam Phran | สามพราน | Nakhon Pathom | นครปฐม | Central |
| Tha Kham | ท่าข้าม | Khet Bang Khun Thian | บางขุนเทียน | Bangkok | กรุงเทพมหานคร | Central |
| Tha Kham | ท่าข้าม | Phunphin | พุนพิน | Surat Thani | สุราษฎร์ธานี | South |
| Tha Kham | ท่าข้าม | Palian | ปะเหลียน | Trang | ตรัง | South |
| Tha Kham | ท่าข้าม | Bang Pakong | บางปะกง | Chachoengsao | ฉะเชิงเทรา | East |
| Tha Kham | ท่าข้าม | Phanat Nikhom | พนัสนิคม | Chonburi | ชลบุรี | East |
| Tha Kham | ท่าข้าม | Mueang Phrae | เมืองแพร่ | Phrae | แพร่ | North |
| Tha Kham | ท่าข้าม | Panare (Malay: Penarik) | ปะนาเระ | Pattani | ปัตตานี | South |
| Tha Kham | ท่าข้าม | Chon Daen | ชนแดน | Phetchabun | เพชรบูรณ์ | Central |
| Tha Kham | ท่าข้าม | Khai Bang Rachan | ค่ายบางระจัน | Sing Buri | สิงห์บุรี | Central |
| Tha Kham | ท่าข้าม | Wiang Kaen | เวียงแก่น | Chiang Rai | เชียงราย | North |
| Tha Kham | ท่าข้าม | Aranyaprathet | อรัญประเทศ | Sa Kaeo | สระแก้ว | East |
| Tha Kham | ท่าข้าม | Tha Sae | ท่าแซะ | Chumphon | ชุมพร | South |
| Tha Khamin | ท่าขมิ้น | Pho Thale | โพทะเล | Phichit | พิจิตร | Central |
| Tha Khanan | ท่าขนาน | Chian Yai | เชียรใหญ่ | Nakhon Si Thammarat | นครศรีธรรมราช | South |
| Tha Khanon | ท่าขนอน | Khiri Rat Nikhom | คีรีรัฐนิคม | Surat Thani | สุราษฎร์ธานี | South |
| Tha Khantho | ท่าคันโท | Tha Khantho | ท่าคันโท | Kalasin | กาฬสินธุ์ | North-East |
| Tha Khanun | ท่าขนุน | Thong Pha Phum | ทองผาภูมิ | Kanchanaburi | กาญจนบุรี | West |
| Tha Khao Plueak | ท่าข้าวเปลือก | Mae Chan | แม่จัน | Chiang Rai | เชียงราย | North |
| Tha Khlo | ท่าคล้อ | Kaeng Khoi | แก่งคอย | Saraburi | สระบุรี | Central |
| Tha Khlo | ท่าค้อ | Mueang Nakhon Phanom | เมืองนครพนม | Nakhon Phanom | นครพนม | North-East |
| Tha Khoei | ท่าเคย | Tha Chang | ท่าฉาง | Surat Thani | สุราษฎร์ธานี | South |
| Tha Khoei | ท่าเคย | Suan Phueng | สวนผึ้ง | Ratchaburi | ราชบุรี | West |
| Tha Khoi | ท่าคอย | Tha Yang | ท่ายาง | Phetchaburi | เพชรบุรี | West |
| Tha Khon Yang | ท่าขอนยาง | Kantharawichai | กันทรวิชัย | Maha Sarakham | มหาสารคาม | North-East |
| Tha Khuen | ท่าขึ้น | Tha Sala | ท่าศาลา | Nakhon Si Thammarat | นครศรีธรรมราช | South |
| Tha Khum Ngoen | ทาขุมเงิน | Mae Tha | แม่ทะ | Lamphun | ลำพูน | North |
| Tha Khun Ram | ท่าขุนราม | Mueang Kamphaeng Phet | เมืองกำแพงเพชร | Kamphaeng Phet | กำแพงเพชร | Central |
| Tha Ko | ท่าก๊อ | Mae Suai | แม่สรวย | Chiang Rai | เชียงราย | North |
| Tha Kok Daeng | ท่ากกแดง | Seka | เซกา | Bueng Kan | บึงกาฬ | North-East |
| Tha Kok Daeng | ท่ากกแดง | Seka | เซกา | Nong Khai | หนองคาย | North-East |
| Tha Kon | ท่าก้อน | Akat Amnuai | อากาศอำนวย | Sakon Nakhon | สกลนคร | North-East |
| Tha Krachap | ท่ากระชับ | Nakhon Chai Si | นครชัยศรี | Nakhon Pathom | นครปฐม | Central |
| Tha Kradan | ท่ากระดาน | Sanam Chai Khet | สนามชัยเขต | Chachoengsao | ฉะเชิงเทรา | East |
| Tha Kradan | ท่ากระดาน | Si Sawat | ศรีสวัสดิ์ | Kanchanaburi | กาญจนบุรี | West |
| Tha Kradan | ท่ากระดาน | Khiri Rat Nikhom | คีรีรัฐนิคม | Surat Thani | สุราษฎร์ธานี | South |
| Tha Krasoem | ท่ากระเสริม | Nam Phong | น้ำพอง | Khon Kaen | ขอนแก่น | North-East |
| Tha Kum | ท่ากุ่ม | Mueang Trat | เมืองตราด | Trat | ตราด | East |
| Tha Kup | ท่ากูบ | Sap Yai | ซับใหญ่ | Chaiyaphum | ชัยภูมิ | North-East |
| Tha Kwang | ท่ากว้าง | Saraphi | สารภี | Chiang Mai | เชียงใหม่ | North |
| Tha Kwian | ท่าเกวียน | Watthana Nakhon | วัฒนานคร | Sa Kaeo | สระแก้ว | East |
| Tha Laeng | ท่าแลง | Tha Yang | ท่ายาง | Phetchaburi | เพชรบุรี | West |
| Tha Lat | ท่าลาด | Chum Phuang | ชุมพวง | Nakhon Ratchasima | นครราชสีมา | North-East |
| Tha Lat | ท่าลาด | Renu Nakhon | เรณูนคร | Nakhon Phanom | นครพนม | North-East |
| Tha Lat | ท่าลาด | Warin Chamrap | วารินชำราบ | Ubon Ratchathani | อุบลราชธานี | North-East |
| Tha Lat Khao | ท่าลาดขาว | Chok Chai | โชคชัย | Nakhon Ratchasima | นครราชสีมา | North-East |
| Tha Li | ท่าลี่ | Kumphawapi | กุมภวาปี | Udon Thani | อุดรธานี | North-East |
| Tha Li | ท่าลี่ | Tha Li | ท่าลี่ | Loei | เลย | North-East |
| Tha Lo | ท่าล้อ | Tha Muang | ท่าม่วง | Kanchanaburi | กาญจนบุรี | West |
| Tha Lo | ท่าฬ่อ | Mueang Phichit | เมืองพิจิตร | Phichit | พิจิตร | Central |
| Tha Luang | ท่าหลวง | Tha Luang | ท่าหลวง | Lopburi | ลพบุรี | Central |
| Tha Luang | ท่าหลวง | Trakan Phuet Phon | ตระการพืชผล | Ubon Ratchathani | อุบลราชธานี | North-East |
| Tha Luang | ท่าหลวง | Makham | มะขาม | Chanthaburi | จันทบุรี | East |
| Tha Luang | ท่าหลวง | Tha Ruea | ท่าเรือ | Phra Nakhon Si Ayutthaya | พระนครศรีอยุธยา | Central |
| Tha Luang | ท่าหลวง | Phimai | พิมาย | Nakhon Ratchasima | นครราชสีมา | North-East |
| Tha Luang | ท่าหลวง | Mueang Phichit | เมืองพิจิตร | Phichit | พิจิตร | Central |
| Tha Maduea | ท่ามะเดื่อ | Bang Kaeo | บางแก้ว | Phatthalung | พัทลุง | South |
| Tha Mae Lop | ทาแม่ลอบ | Mae Tha | แม่ทะ | Lamphun | ลำพูน | North |
| Tha Mafai Wan | ท่ามะไฟหวาน | Kaeng Khro | แก้งคร้อ | Chaiyaphum | ชัยภูมิ | North-East |
| Tha Mafueang | ท่ามะเฟือง | Phichai | พิชัย | Uttaradit | อุตรดิตถ์ | North |
| Tha Mai | ท่าไม้ | Krathum Baen | กระทุ่มแบน | Samut Sakhon | สมุทรสาคร | Central |
| Tha Mai | ท่าไม้ | Phran Kratai | พรานกระต่าย | Kamphaeng Phet | กำแพงเพชร | Central |
| Tha Mai | ท่าไม้ | Chum Saeng | ชุมแสง | Nakhon Sawan | นครสวรรค์ | Central |
| Tha Mai | ท่าไม้ | Tha Maka | ท่ามะกา | Kanchanaburi | กาญจนบุรี | West |
| Tha Mai | ท่าใหม่ | Tha Mai | ท่าใหม่ | Chanthaburi | จันทบุรี | East |
| Tha Mai Ruak | ท่าไม้รวก | Tha Yang | ท่ายาง | Phetchaburi | เพชรบุรี | West |
| Tha Maka | ท่ามะกา | Tha Maka | ท่ามะกา | Kanchanaburi | กาญจนบุรี | West |
| Tha Makham | ท่ามะขาม | Mueang Kanchanaburi | เมืองกาญจนบุรี | Kanchanaburi | กาญจนบุรี | West |
| Tha Makhuea | ท่ามะเขือ | Khlong Khlung | ขลุง คลองขลุง | Kamphaeng Phet | กำแพงเพชร | Central |
| Tha Manao | ท่ามะนาว | Chai Badan | ชัยบาดาล | Lopburi | ลพบุรี | Central |
| Tha Maphla | ท่ามะพลา | Lang Suan | หลังสวน | Chumphon | ชุมพร | South |
| Tha Maprang | ท่ามะปราง | Kaeng Khoi | แก่งคอย | Saraburi | สระบุรี | Central |
| Tha Miram | ท่ามิหรำ | Mueang Phatthalung | เมืองพัทลุง | Phatthalung | พัทลุง | South |
| Tha Mo Sai | ท่าหมอไทร | Chana (Malay: Chenok) | จะนะ | Songkhla | สงขลา | South |
| Tha Muang | ท่าม่วง | Tha Muang | ท่าม่วง | Kanchanaburi | กาญจนบุรี | West |
| Tha Muang | ท่าม่วง | Satuek | สตึก | Buriram | บุรีรัมย์ | North-East |
| Tha Muang | ท่าม่วง | Thepha (Malay: Tiba) | เทพา | Songkhla | สงขลา | South |
| Tha Muang | ท่าม่วง | Selaphum | เสลภูมิ | Roi Et | ร้อยเอ็ด | North-East |
| Tha Mueang | ท่าเมือง | Don Mot Daeng | ดอนมดแดง | Ubon Ratchathani | อุบลราชธานี | North-East |
| Tha Muen Ram | ท่าหมื่นราม | Wang Thong | วังทอง | Phitsanulok | พิษณุโลก | Central |
| Tha Na | ท่านา | Kapong | กะปง | Phang Nga | พังงา | South |
| Tha Nam | ท่าน้ำ | Panare (Malay: Penarik) | ปะนาเระ | Pattani | ปัตตานี | South |
| Tha Nam Oi | ท่าน้ำอ้อย | Phayuha Khiri | พยุหะคีรี | Nakhon Sawan | นครสวรรค์ | Central |
| Tha Nang | ท่านั่ง | Pho Thale | โพทะเล | Phichit | พิจิตร | Central |
| Tha Nang Naeo | ท่านางแนว | Waeng Noi | แวงน้อย | Khon Kaen | ขอนแก่น | North-East |
| Tha Nang Ngam | ท่านางงาม | Bang Rakam | บางระกำ | Phitsanulok | พิษณุโลก | Central |
| Tha Nao | ท่าน้าว | Phu Phiang | ภูเพียง | Nan | น่าน | North |
| Tha Nat | ท่านัด | Damnoen Saduak | ดำเนินสะดวก | Ratchaburi | ราชบุรี | West |
| Tha Ngam | ท่างาม | In Buri | อินทร์บุรี | Sing Buri | สิงห์บุรี | Central |
| Tha Ngam | ท่างาม | Wat Bot | วัดโบสถ์ | Phitsanulok | พิษณุโลก | Central |
| Tha Ngam | ท่างาม | Mueang Prachinburi | เมืองปราจีนบุรี | Prachin Buri | ปราจีนบุรี | East |
| Tha Ngio | ท่างิ้ว | Banphot Phisai | บรรพตพิสัย | Nakhon Sawan | นครสวรรค์ | Central |
| Tha Ngio | ท่างิ้ว | Huai Yot | ห้วยยอด | Trang | ตรัง | South |
| Tha Ngio | ท่างิ้ว | Mueang Nakhon Si Thammarat | นครศรีธรรมราช | Nakhon Si Thammarat | นครศรีธรรมราช | South |
| Tha Nuea | ทาเหนือ | Mae On | แม่ออน | Chiang Mai | เชียงใหม่ | North |
| Tha Pha | ท่าผา | Ban Pong | บ้านโป่ง | Ratchaburi | ราชบุรี | West |
| Tha Pha | ท่าผา | Mae Chaem | แม่แจ่ม | Chiang Mai | เชียงใหม่ | North |
| Tha Pha | ท่าผา | Ko Kha | เกาะคา | Lampang | ลำปาง | North |
| Tha Pha Pum | ท่าผาปุ้ม | Mae La Noi | แม่ลาน้อย | Mae Hong Son | แม่ฮ่องสอน | North |
| Tha Phae | ท่าแพ | Tha Phae | ท่าแพ | Satun | สตูล | South |
| Tha Phaya | ท่าพญา | Palian | ปะเหลียน | Trang | ตรัง | South |
| Tha Phaya | ท่าพยา | Pak Phanang | ปากพนัง | Nakhon Si Thammarat | นครศรีธรรมราช | South |
| Tha Phi Liang | ท่าพี่เลี้ยง | Mueang Suphanburi | เมืองสุพรรณบุรี | Suphan Buri | สุพรรณบุรี | Central |
| Tha Phlap | ท่าพลับ | Ban Pho | บ้านโพธิ์ | Chachoengsao | ฉะเชิงเทรา | East |
| Tha Pho | ท่าโพธิ์ | Sadao (Malay: Sendawa) | สะเดา | Songkhla | สงขลา | South |
| Tha Pho | ท่าโพ | Nong Khayang | หนองขาหย่าง | Uthai Thani | อุทัยธานี | Central |
| Tha Pho | ท่าโพธิ์ | Mueang Phitsanulok | เมืองพิษณุโลก | Phitsanulok | พิษณุโลก | Central |
| Tha Pho Chai | ท่าโพธิ์ชัย | Nong Ki | หนองกี่ | Buriram | บุรีรัมย์ | North-East |
| Tha Pho Si | ท่าโพธิ์ศรี | Det Udom | เดชอุดม | Ubon Ratchathani | อุบลราชธานี | North-East |
| Tha Phon | ท่าพล | Mueang Phetchabun | เมืองเพชรบูรณ์ | Phetchabun | เพชรบูรณ์ | Central |
| Tha Phra | ท่าพระ | Mueang Khon Kaen | เมืองขอนแก่น | Khon Kaen | ขอนแก่น | North-East |
| Tha Phraya | ท่าพระยา | Nakhon Chai Si | นครชัยศรี | Nakhon Pathom | นครปฐม | Central |
| Tha Phrik | ท่าพริก | Mueang Trat | เมืองตราด | Trat | ตราด | East |
| Tha Phutsa | ท่าพุทรา | Khlong Khlung | ขลุง คลองขลุง | Kamphaeng Phet | กำแพงเพชร | Central |
| Tha Pla | ท่าปลา | Tha Pla | ท่าปลา | Uttaradit | อุตรดิตถ์ | North |
| Tha Pla Duk | ทาปลาดุก | Mae Tha | แม่ทะ | Lamphun | ลำพูน | North |
| Tha Pracha | ท่าประจะ | Cha-uat | ชะอวด | Nakhon Si Thammarat | นครศรีธรรมราช | South |
| Tha Pradu | ท่าประดู่ | Mueang Rayong | เมืองระยอง | Rayong | ระยอง | East |
| Tha Pradu | ท่าประดู่ | Na Thawi (Malay: Nawi) | นาทวี | Songkhla | สงขลา | South |
| Tha Rae | ท่าแร่ | Mueang Sakon Nakhon | เมืองสกลนคร | Sakon Nakhon | สกลนคร | North-East |
| Tha Raeng | ท่าแร้ง | Khet Bang Khen | บางเขน | Bangkok | กรุงเทพมหานคร | Central |
| Tha Raeng | ท่าแร้ง | Ban Laem | บ้านแหลม | Phetchaburi | เพชรบุรี | West |
| Tha Raeng Ok | ท่าแร้งออก | Ban Laem | บ้านแหลม | Phetchaburi | เพชรบุรี | West |
| Tha Rahat | ท่าระหัด | Mueang Suphanburi | เมืองสุพรรณบุรี | Suphan Buri | สุพรรณบุรี | Central |
| Tha Rai | ท่าไร่ | Mueang Nakhon Si Thammarat | นครศรีธรรมราช | Nakhon Si Thammarat | นครศรีธรรมราช | South |
| Tha Rap | ท่าราบ | Mueang Phetchaburi | เมืองเพชรบุรี | Phetchaburi | เพชรบุรี | West |
| Tha Rap | ท่าราบ | Mueang Ratchaburi | เมืองราชบุรี | Ratchaburi | ราชบุรี | West |
| Tha Rong | ท่าโรง | Wichian Buri | วิเชียรบุรี | Phetchabun | เพชรบูรณ์ | Central |
| Tha Rong Chang | ท่าโรงช้าง | Phunphin | พุนพิน | Surat Thani | สุราษฎร์ธานี | South |
| Tha Ruea | ท่าเรือ | Khok Pho | โคกโพธิ์ | Pattani | ปัตตานี | South |
| Tha Ruea | ท่าเรือ | Ban Na Doem | บ้านนาเดิม | Surat Thani | สุราษฎร์ธานี | South |
| Tha Ruea | ท่าเรือ | Tha Ruea | ท่าเรือ | Phra Nakhon Si Ayutthaya | พระนครศรีอยุธยา | Central |
| Tha Ruea | ท่าเรือ | Mueang Nakhon Si Thammarat | นครศรีธรรมราช | Nakhon Si Thammarat | นครศรีธรรมราช | South |
| Tha Ruea | ท่าเรือ | Tha Phae | ท่าแพ | Satun | สตูล | South |
| Tha Ruea | ท่าเรือ | Pak Phli | ปากพลี | Nakhon Nayok | นครนายก | Central |
| Tha Ruea | ท่าเรือ | Tha Maka | ท่ามะกา | Kanchanaburi | กาญจนบุรี | West |
| Tha Ruea | ท่าเรือ | Na Wa | นาหว้า | Nakhon Phanom | นครพนม | North-East |
| Tha Sa-an | ท่าสะอ้าน | Bang Pakong | บางปะกง | Chachoengsao | ฉะเชิงเทรา | East |
| Tha Sa-at | ท่าสะอาด | Na Duang | นาด้วง | Loei | เลย | North-East |
| Tha Sa-at | ท่าสะอาด | Seka | เซกา | Bueng Kan | บึงกาฬ | North-East |
| Tha Sa-at | ท่าสะอาด | Seka | เซกา | Nong Khai | หนองคาย | North-East |
| Tha Saba | ท่าสะบ้า | Wang Wiset | เขาวิเศษ | Trang | ตรัง | South |
| Tha Sae | ท่าแซะ | Tha Sae | ท่าแซะ | Chumphon | ชุมพร | South |
| Tha Sai | ท่าสาย | Mueang Chiang Rai | เมืองเชียงราย | Chiang Rai | เชียงราย | North |
| Tha Sai | ท่าทราย | Mueang Nakhon Nayok | เมืองนครนายก | Nakhon Nayok | นครนายก | Central |
| Tha Sai | ท่าทราย | Mueang Nonthaburi | เมืองนนทบุรี | Nonthaburi | นนทบุรี | Central |
| Tha Sai | ท่าทราย | Mueang Samut Sakhon | เมืองสมุทรสาคร | Samut Sakhon | สมุทรสาคร | Central |
| Tha Sai Luat | ท่าสายลวด | Mae Sot | แม่สอด, | Tak | ตาก | West |
| Tha Sak | ท่าซัก | Mueang Nakhon Si Thammarat | นครศรีธรรมราช | Nakhon Si Thammarat | นครศรีธรรมราช | South |
| Tha Sak | ท่าสัก | Phichai | พิชัย | Uttaradit | อุตรดิตถ์ | North |
| Tha Sakae | ท่าสะแก | Chat Trakan | ชาติตระการ | Phitsanulok | พิษณุโลก | Central |
| Tha Sala | ท่าศาลา | Tha Sala | ท่าศาลา | Nakhon Si Thammarat | นครศรีธรรมราช | South |
| Tha Sala | ท่าศาลา | Mancha Khiri | มัญจาคีรี | Khon Kaen | ขอนแก่น | North-East |
| Tha Sala | ท่าศาลา | Mueang Chiang Mai | เมืองเชียงใหม่ | Chiang Mai | เชียงใหม่ | North |
| Tha Sala | ท่าศาลา | Mueang Lopburi | เมืองลพบุรี | Lopburi | ลพบุรี | Central |
| Tha Sala | ท่าศาลา | Phu Ruea | ภูเรือ | Loei | เลย | North-East |
| Tha Samet | ท่าเสม็ด | Cha-uat | ชะอวด | Nakhon Si Thammarat | นครศรีธรรมราช | South |
| Tha Sao | ท่าเสา | Krathum Baen | กระทุ่มแบน | Samut Sakhon | สมุทรสาคร | Central |
| Tha Sao | ท่าเสา | Tha Maka | ท่ามะกา | Kanchanaburi | กาญจนบุรี | West |
| Tha Sao | ท่าเสา | Mueang Uttaradit | เมืองอุตรดิตถ์ | Uttaradit | อุตรดิตถ์ | North |
| Tha Sao | ท่าเสา | Sai Yok | ไทรโยค | Kanchanaburi | กาญจนบุรี | West |
| Tha Sao | ท่าเสา | Pho Thale | โพทะเล | Phichit | พิจิตร | Central |
| Tha Sap | ท่าสาป | Mueang Yala | เมืองยะลา | Yala | ยะลา | South |
| Tha Sathon | ท่าสะท้อน | Phunphin | พุนพิน | Surat Thani | สุราษฎร์ธานี | South |
| Tha Sawan | ท่าสวรรค์ | Na Duang | นาด้วง | Loei | เลย | North-East |
| Tha Sawang | ท่าสว่าง | Mueang Surin | เมืองสุรินทร์ | Surin | สุรินทร์ | North-East |
| Tha Sen | ท่าเสน | Ban Lat | บ้านลาด | Phetchaburi | เพชรบุรี | West |
| Tha Sida | ท่าสีดา | Nong Phok | หนองพอก | Roi Et | ร้อยเอ็ด | North-East |
| Tha Sila | ท่าศิลา | Song Dao | ส่องดาว | Sakon Nakhon | สกลนคร | North-East |
| Tha Som | ท่าซอม | Hua Sai | หัวไทร | Nakhon Si Thammarat | นครศรีธรรมราช | South |
| Tha Som | ท่าโสม | Khao Saming | เขาสมิง | Trat | ตราด | East |
| Tha Song Khon | ท่าสองคอน | Mueang Maha Sarakham | เมืองมหาสารคาม | Maha Sarakham | มหาสารคาม | North-East |
| Tha Song Yang | ท่าสองยาง | Tha Song Yang | ท่าสองยาง | Tak | ตาก | West |
| Tha Sop Sao | ทาสบเส้า | Mae Tha | แม่ทะ | Lamphun | ลำพูน | North |
| Tha Sung | ท่าซุง | Mueang Uthai Thani | เมืองอุทัยธานี | Uthai Thani | อุทัยธานี | Central |
| Tha Sut | ท่าสุด | Mueang Chiang Rai | เมืองเชียงราย | Chiang Rai | เชียงราย | North |
| Tha Takhro | ท่าตะคร้อ | Nong Ya Plong | หนองหญ้าปล้อง | Phetchaburi | เพชรบุรี | West |
| Tha Takiap | ท่าตะเกียบ | Tha Takiap | ท่าตะเกีย | Chachoengsao | ฉะเชิงเทรา | East |
| Tha Tako | ท่าตะโก | Tha Tako | ท่าตะโก | Nakhon Sawan | นครสวรรค์ | Central |
| Tha Takro | ท่าตะคร้อ | Tha Muang | ท่าม่วง | Kanchanaburi | กาญจนบุรี | West |
| Tha Talat | ท่าตลาด | Sam Phran | สามพราน | Nakhon Pathom | นครปฐม | Central |
| Tha Tan | ท่าตาล | Bang Krathum | บางกระทุ่ม | Phitsanulok | พิษณุโลก | Central |
| Tha Taphao | ท่าตะเภา | Mueang Chumphon | เมืองชุมพร | Chumphon | ชุมพร | South |
| Tha Tamnak | ท่าตำหนัก | Nakhon Chai Si | นครชัยศรี | Nakhon Pathom | นครปฐม | Central |
| Tha Than | ท่าถ่าน | Phanom Sarakham | พนมสารคาม | Chachoengsao | ฉะเชิงเทรา | East |
| Tha Thewawong | ท่าเทววงษ์ | Ko Sichang | เกาะสีชัง | Chonburi | ชลบุรี | East |
| Tha Thong | ท่าทอง | Sawankhalok | สวรรคโลก | Sukhothai | สุโขทัย | Central |
| Tha Thong | ท่าทอง | Kanchanadit | กาญจนดิษฐ์ | Surat Thani | สุราษฎร์ธานี | South |
| Tha Thong | ท่าทอง | Mueang Phitsanulok | เมืองพิษณุโลก | Phitsanulok | พิษณุโลก | Central |
| Tha Thong | ท่าธง | Raman (Malay: Reman) | รามัน | Yala | ยะลา | South |
| Tha Thong Mai | ท่าทองใหม่ | Kanchanadit | กาญจนดิษฐ์ | Surat Thani | สุราษฎร์ธานี | South |
| Tha Thonglang | ท่าทองหลาง | Bang Khla | บางคล้า | Chachoengsao | ฉะเชิงเทรา | East |
| Tha Thung Luang | ทาทุ่งหลวง | Mae Tha | แม่ทะ | Lamphun | ลำพูน | North |
| Tha Ton | ท่าตอน | Mae Ai | แม่อาย | Chiang Mai | เชียงใหม่ | North |
| Tha Tum | ท่าตุ้ม | Pa Sang | ป่าซาง | Lamphun | ลำพูน | North |
| Tha Tum | ท่าตูม | Tha Tum | ท่าตูม | Surin | สุรินทร์ | North-East |
| Tha Tum | ท่าตูม | Mueang Maha Sarakham | เมืองมหาสารคาม | Maha Sarakham | มหาสารคาม | North-East |
| Tha Tum | ท่าตูม | Si Maha Phot | ศรีมหาโพธิ | Prachin Buri | ปราจีนบุรี | East |
| Tha Tum | ท่าตูม | Kaeng Khoi | แก่งคอย | Saraburi | สระบุรี | Central |
| Tha U-thae | ท่าอุแท | Kanchanadit | กาญจนดิษฐ์ | Surat Thani | สุราษฎร์ธานี | South |
| Tha Uthen | ท่าอุเทน | Tha Uthen | ท่าอุเทน | Nakhon Phanom | นครพนม | North-East |
| Tha Wang | ท่าวัง | Mueang Nakhon Si Thammarat | นครศรีธรรมราช | Nakhon Si Thammarat | นครศรีธรรมราช | South |
| Tha Wang Pha | ท่าวังผา | Tha Wang Pha | ท่าวังผา | Nan | น่าน | North |
| Tha Wang Phrao | ท่าวังพร้าว | San Pa Tong | สันป่าตอง | Chiang Mai | เชียงใหม่ | North |
| Tha Wang Tan | ท่าวังตาล | Saraphi | สารภี | Chiang Mai | เชียงใหม่ | North |
| Tha Wang Thong | ท่าวังทอง | Mueang Phayao | เมืองพะเยา | Phayao | พะเยา | North |
| Tha Wasukri | ท่าวาสุกรี | Phra Nakhon Si Ayutthaya | พระนครศรีอยุธยา | Phra Nakhon Si Ayutthaya | พระนครศรีอยุธยา | Central |
| Tha Wat | ท่าวัด | Waeng Noi | แวงน้อย | Khon Kaen | ขอนแก่น | North-East |
| Tha Wung | ท่าวุ้ง | Tha Wung | ท่าวุ้ง | Lopburi | ลพบุรี | Central |
| Tha Yaek | ท่าแยก | Mueang Sa Kaeo | เมืองสระแก้ว | Sa Kaeo | สระแก้ว | East |
| Tha Yai | ท่าใหญ่ | Nong Bua Daeng | หนองบัวแดง | Chaiyaphum | ชัยภูมิ | North-East |
| Tha Yang | ท่ายาง | Tha Yang | ท่ายาง | Phetchaburi | เพชรบุรี | West |
| Tha Yang | ท่ายาง | Thung Yai | ทุ่งใหญ่ | Nakhon Si Thammarat | นครศรีธรรมราช | South |
| Tha Yang | ท่ายาง | Mueang Chumphon | เมืองชุมพร | Chumphon | ชุมพร | South |
| Tha Yiam | ท่าเยี่ยม | Sak Lek | สากเหล็ก | Phichit | พิจิตร | Central |
| Tha Yiam | ท่าเยี่ยม | Chok Chai | โชคชัย | Nakhon Ratchasima | นครราชสีมา | North-East |
| Tha Yu | ท่าอยู่ | Takua Thung | ตะกั่วทุ่ง | Phang Nga | พังงา | South |
| Thai Ban | ท้ายบ้าน | Mueang Samut Prakan | เมืองสมุทรปราการ | Samut Prakan | สมุทรปราการ | Central |
| Thai Ban Mai | ท้ายบ้านใหม่ | Mueang Samut Prakan | เมืองสมุทรปราการ | Samut Prakan | สมุทรปราการ | Central |
| Thai Buri | ไทยบุรี | Tha Sala | ท่าศาลา | Nakhon Si Thammarat | นครศรีธรรมราช | South |
| Thai Chana Suek | ไทยชนะศึก | Thung Saliam | ทุ่งเสลี่ยม | Sukhothai | สุโขทัย | Central |
| Thai Chang | ท้ายช้าง | Mueang Phang Nga | เมืองพังงา | Phang Nga | พังงา | South |
| Thai Charoen | ไทยเจริญ | Pakham | ปะคำ | Buriram | บุรีรัมย์ | North-East |
| Thai Charoen | ไทยเจริญ | Nong Bun Mak | หนองบุญมาก | Nakhon Ratchasima | นครราชสีมา | North-East |
| Thai Dong | ท้ายดง | Wang Pong | วังโป่ง | Phetchabun | เพชรบูรณ์ | Central |
| Thai Hat | ท้ายหาด | Mueang Samut Songkhram | เมืองสมุทรสงคราม | Samut Songkhram | สมุทรสงคราม | Central |
| Thai Ko | ท้ายเกาะ | Sam Khok | สามโคก | Pathum Thani | ปทุมธานี | Central |
| Thai Mueang | ท้ายเหมือง | Thai Mueang | ท้ายเหมือง | Phang Nga | พังงา | South |
| Thai Nam | ท้ายน้ำ | Pho Thale | โพทะเล | Phichit | พิจิตร | Central |
| Thai Samakkhi | ไทยสามัคคี | Nong Hong | หนองหงส์ | Buriram | บุรีรัมย์ | North-East |
| Thai Samakkhi | ไทยสามัคคี | Wang Nam Khiao | วังน้ำเขียว | Nakhon Ratchasima | นครราชสีมา | North-East |
| Thai Samphao | ท้ายสำเภา | Phra Phrom | พระพรหม | Nakhon Si Thammarat | นครศรีธรรมราช | South |
| Thai Talat | ท้ายตลาด | Mueang Lopburi | เมืองลพบุรี | Lopburi | ลพบุรี | Central |
| Thai Thung | ท้ายทุ่ง | Tap Khlo | ทับคล้อ | Phichit | พิจิตร | Central |
| Thai Udom | ไทยอุดม | Khlong Hat | คลองหาด | Sa Kaeo | สระแก้ว | East |
| Thaiyawat | ไทยาวาส | Nakhon Chai Si | นครชัยศรี | Nakhon Pathom | นครปฐม | Central |
| Thale Bok | ทะเลบก | Don Chedi | ดอนเจดีย์ | Suphan Buri | สุพรรณบุรี | Central |
| Thale Chup Son | ทะเลชุบศร | Mueang Lopburi | เมืองลพบุรี | Lopburi | ลพบุรี | Central |
| Thale Noi | ทะเลน้อย | Khuan Khanun | ควนขนุน | Phatthalung | พัทลุง | South |
| Thale Sap | ทะเลทรัพย์ | Phato | พะโต๊ะ | Chumphon | ชุมพร | South |
| Thale Wang Wat | ทะเลวังวัด | Tha Luang | ท่าหลวง | Lopburi | ลพบุรี | Central |
| Thalung Lek | ถลุงเหล็ก | Mueang Buriram | เมืองบุรีรัมย์ | Buriram | บุรีรัมย์ | North-East |
| Thalung Lek | ถลุงเหล็ก | Khok Samrong | โคกสำโรง | Lopburi | ลพบุรี | Central |
| Tham | ถ้ำ | Takua Thung | ตะกั่วทุ่ง | Phang Nga | พังงา | South |
| Tham | ทาม | Kanthararom | กันทรารมย์ | Sisaket | ศรีสะเกษ | North-East |
| Tham Chalong | ถ้ำฉลอง | Mueang Uttaradit | เมืองอุตรดิตถ์ | Uttaradit | อุตรดิตถ์ | North |
| Tham Charoen | ถ้ำเจริญ | So Phisai | โซ่พิสัย | Bueng Kan | บึงกาฬ | North-East |
| Tham Charoen | ถ้ำเจริญ | So Phisai | โซ่พิสัย | Nong Khai | หนองคาย | North-East |
| Tham Khae | ถ้ำแข้ | Trakan Phuet Phon | ตระการพืชผล | Ubon Ratchathani | อุบลราชธานี | North-East |
| Tham Kratai Thong | ถ้ำกระต่ายทอง | Phran Kratai | พรานกระต่าย | Kamphaeng Phet | กำแพงเพชร | Central |
| Tham Lot | ถ้ำลอด | Pang Mapha | ปางมะผ้า | Mae Hong Son | แม่ฮ่องสอน | North |
| Tham Nam Phut | ถ้ำน้ำผุด | Mueang Phang Nga | เมืองพังงา | Phang Nga | พังงา | South |
| Tham Phannara | ถ้ำพรรณรา | Tham Phannara | ถ้ำพรรณรา | Nakhon Si Thammarat | นครศรีธรรมราช | South |
| Tham Rong | ถ้ำรงค์ | Ban Lat | บ้านลาด | Phetchaburi | เพชรบุรี | West |
| Tham Sing | ถ้ำสิงห์ | Mueang Chumphon | เมืองชุมพร | Chumphon | ชุมพร | South |
| Tham Singkhon | ถ้ำสิงขร | Khiri Rat Nikhom | คีรีรัฐนิคม | Surat Thani | สุราษฎร์ธานี | South |
| Tham Thalu | ถ้ำทะลุ | Bannang Sata (Malay: Benang Setar) | บันนังสตา | Yala | ยะลา | South |
| Tham Thonglang | ถ้ำทองหลาง | Thap Put | ทับปุด | Phang Nga | พังงา | South |
| Tham Wua Daeng | ถ้ำวัวแดง | Nong Bua Daeng | หนองบัวแดง | Chaiyaphum | ชัยภูมิ | North-East |
| Tham Yai | ถ้ำใหญ่ | Thung Song | ทุ่งสง | Nakhon Si Thammarat | นครศรีธรรมราช | South |
| Thamen Chai | ทะเมนชัย | Lam Plai Mat | ลำปลายมาศ | Buriram | บุรีรัมย์ | North-East |
| Thammamun | ธรรมามูล | Mueang Chai Nat | เมืองชัยนาท | Chai Nat | ชัยนาท | Central |
| Thammarong | ธำมรงค์ | Mueang Kamphaeng Phet | เมืองกำแพงเพชร | Kamphaeng Phet | กำแพงเพชร | Central |
| Thammasala | ธรรมศาลา | Mueang Nakhon Pathom | เมืองนครปฐม | Nakhon Phanom | นครพนม | North-East |
| Thammasen | ธรรมเสน | Photharam | โพธาราม | Ratchaburi | ราชบุรี | West |
| Thamnop | ทำนบ | Singhanakhon | สิงหนคร | Songkhla | สงขลา | South |
| Thamnop | ทำนบ | Tha Tako | ท่าตะโก | Nakhon Sawan | นครสวรรค์ | Central |
| Thamo | ทมอ | Prasat | ปราสาท | Surin | สุรินทร์ | North-East |
| Than Kasem | ธารเกษม | Phra Phutthabat | พระพุทธบาท | Saraburi | สระบุรี | Central |
| Than Khiri | ธารคีรี | Saba Yoi (Malay: Sebayu) | สะบ้าย้อย | Songkhla | สงขลา | South |
| Than Lalot | ธารละหลอด | Phimai | พิมาย | Nakhon Ratchasima | นครราชสีมา | North-East |
| Than Nam Thip | ธารน้ำทิพย์ | Betong (Malay: Betung) | เบตง | Yala | ยะลา | South |
| Than Prasat | ธารปราสาท | Non Sung | โนนสูง | Nakhon Ratchasima | นครราชสีมา | North-East |
| Than Tawan | ทานตะวัน | Phan | พาน | Chiang Rai | เชียงราย | North |
| Than Thahan | ธารทหาร | Nong Bua | หนองบัว | Nakhon Sawan | นครสวรรค์ | Central |
| Than Thong | ธารทอง | Phan | พาน | Chiang Rai | เชียงราย | North |
| Than To | ธารโต | Than To | ธารโต | Yala | ยะลา | South |
| Thanao Si | ตะนาวศรี | Suan Phueng | สวนผึ้ง | Ratchaburi | ราชบุรี | West |
| Thang Chang | ทางช้าง | Bang Ban | บางบาล | Phra Nakhon Si Ayutthaya | พระนครศรีอยุธยา | Central |
| Thang Khwang | ทางขวาง | Waeng Noi | แวงน้อย | Khon Kaen | ขอนแก่น | North-East |
| Thang Kwian | ทางเกวียน | Klaeng | แกลง | Rayong | ระยอง | East |
| Thang Phra | ทางพระ | Pho Thong | โพธิ์ทอง | Ang Thong | อ่างทอง | Central |
| Thang Phun | ทางพูน | Chaloem Phra Kiat | เฉลิมพระเกียรติ | Nakhon Si Thammarat | นครศรีธรรมราช | South |
| Thani | ธานี | Mueang Sukhothai | เมืองสุโขทัย | Sukhothai | สุโขทัย | Central |
| Thanon | ถนน | Mayo | มายอ | Pattani | ปัตตานี | South |
| Thanon Hak | ถนนหัก | Nang Rong | นางรอง | Buriram | บุรีรัมย์ | North-East |
| Thanon Khat | ถนนขาด | Mueang Nakhon Pathom | เมืองนครปฐม | Nakhon Phanom | นครพนม | North-East |
| Thanon Nakhon Chai Si | ถนนนครไชยศรี | Khet Dusit | ดุสิต | Bangkok | กรุงเทพมหานคร | Central |
| Thanon Phaya Thai | ถนนพญาไท | Khet Ratchathewi | ราชเทวี | Bangkok | กรุงเทพมหานคร | Central |
| Thanon Phetchaburi | ถนนเพชรบุรี | Khet Ratchathewi | ราชเทวี | Bangkok | กรุงเทพมหานคร | Central |
| Thanon Pho | ถนนโพธิ์ | Non Thai | โนนไทย | Nakhon Ratchasima | นครราชสีมา | North-East |
| Thanon Yai | ถนนใหญ่ | Mueang Lopburi | เมืองลพบุรี | Lopburi | ลพบุรี | Central |
| Thanong | ทะนง | Pho Thale | โพทะเล | Phichit | พิจิตร | Central |
| Thanu | ธนู | Uthai | อุทัย | Phra Nakhon Si Ayutthaya | พระนครศรีอยุธยา | Central |
| Thanya | ธัญญา | Kamalasai | กมลาไสย | Kalasin | กาฬสินธุ์ | North-East |
| Thap Chang | ทับช้าง | Na Thawi (Malay: Nawi) | นาทวี | Songkhla | สงขลา | South |
| Thap Chang | ทับช้าง | Khet Saphan Sung | สะพานสูง | Bangkok | กรุงเทพมหานคร | Central |
| Thap Chang | ทับช้าง | Soi Dao | สอยดาว | Chanthaburi | จันทบุรี | East |
| Thap Khang | ทับคาง | Khao Yoi | เขาย้อย | Phetchaburi | เพชรบุรี | West |
| Thap Khlo | ทับคล้อ | Tap Khlo | ทับคล้อ | Phichit | พิจิตร | Central |
| Thap Krit | ทับกฤช | Chum Saeng | ชุมแสง | Nakhon Sawan | นครสวรรค์ | Central |
| Thap Krit Tai | ทับกฤชใต้ | Chum Saeng | ชุมแสง | Nakhon Sawan | นครสวรรค์ | Central |
| Thap Kung | ทับกุง | Nong Saeng | หนองแสง | Udon Thani | อุดรธานี | North-East |
| Thap Kwang | ทับกวาง | Kaeng Khoi | แก่งคอย | Saraburi | สระบุรี | Central |
| Thap Luang | ทัพหลวง | Ban Rai | บ้านไร่ | Uthai Thani | อุทัยธานี | Central |
| Thap Luang | ทัพหลวง | Mueang Nakhon Pathom | เมืองนครปฐม | Nakhon Phanom | นครพนม | North-East |
| Thap Luang | ทัพหลวง | Nong Ya Sai | หนองหญ้าไซ | Suphan Buri | สุพรรณบุรี | Central |
| Thap Ma | ทับมา | Mueang Rayong | เมืองระยอง | Rayong | ระยอง | East |
| Thap Man | ทับหมัน | Taphan Hin | ตะพานหิน | Phichit | พิจิตร | Central |
| Thap Phrik | ทับพริก | Aranyaprathet | อรัญประเทศ | Sa Kaeo | สระแก้ว | East |
| Thap Phueng | ทับผึ้ง | Si Samrong | ศรีสำโรง | Sukhothai | สุโขทัย | Central |
| Thap Prik | ทับปริก | Mueang Krabi | เมืองกระบี่ | Krabi | กระบี่ | South |
| Thap Put | ทับปุด | Thap Put | ทับปุด | Phang Nga | พังงา | South |
| Thap Rang | ทัพรั้ง | Phra Thong Kham | พระทองคำ | Nakhon Ratchasima | นครราชสีมา | North-East |
| Thap Rat | ทัพราช | Ta Phraya | ตาพระยา | Sa Kaeo | สระแก้ว | East |
| Thap Sadet | ทัพเสด็จ | Ta Phraya | ตาพระยา | Sa Kaeo | สระแก้ว | East |
| Thap Sai | ทับไทร | Pong Nam Ron | โป่งน้ำร้อน | Chanthaburi | จันทบุรี | East |
| Thap Sakae | ทับสะแก | Thap Sakae | ทับสะแก | Prachuap Khiri Khan | ประจวบคีรีขันธ์ | West |
| Thap Sawai | ทับสวาย | Huai Thalaeng | ห้วยแถลง | Nakhon Ratchasima | นครราชสีมา | North-East |
| Thap Thai | ทัพไทย | Ta Phraya | ตาพระยา | Sa Kaeo | สระแก้ว | East |
| Thap Than | ทับทัน | Sangkha | สังขะ | Surin | สุรินทร์ | North-East |
| Thap Than | ทัพทัน | Thap Than | ทัพทัน | Uthai Thani | อุทัยธานี | Central |
| Thap Thiang | ทับเที่ยง | Mueang Trang | เมืองตรัง | Trang | ตรัง | South |
| Thap Ti Lek | ทับตีเหล็ก | Mueang Suphanburi | เมืองสุพรรณบุรี | Suphan Buri | สุพรรณบุรี | Central |
| Thap Ya | ทับยา | In Buri | อินทร์บุรี | Sing Buri | สิงห์บุรี | Central |
| Thap Yai | ทับใหญ่ | Rattanaburi | รัตนบุรี | Surin | สุรินทร์ | North-East |
| Thap Yai Chiang | ทับยายเชียง | Phrom Phiram | พรหมพิราม | Phitsanulok | พิษณุโลก | Central |
| Thap Yao | ทับยาว | Khet Lat Krabang | ลาดกระบัง | Bangkok | กรุงเทพมหานคร | Central |
| That | ธาตุ | Warin Chamrap | วารินชำราบ | Ubon Ratchathani | อุบลราชธานี | North-East |
| That | ธาตุ | Rattanaburi | รัตนบุรี | Surin | สุรินทร์ | North-East |
| That | ธาตุ | Chiang Khan | เชียงคาน | Loei | เลย | North-East |
| That | ธาตุ | Wang Hin | วังหิน | Sisaket | ศรีสะเกษ | North-East |
| That | ธาตุ | Wanon Niwat | วานรนิวาส | Sakon Nakhon | สกลนคร | North-East |
| That Choeng Chum | ธาตุเชิงชุม | Mueang Sakon Nakhon | เมืองสกลนคร | Sakon Nakhon | สกลนคร | North-East |
| That Na Weng | ธาตุนาเวง | Mueang Sakon Nakhon | เมืองสกลนคร | Sakon Nakhon | สกลนคร | North-East |
| That Noi | ธาตุน้อย | Khueang Nai | เขื่องใน | Ubon Ratchathani | อุบลราชธานี | North-East |
| That Phanom Nuea | ธาตุพนมเหนือ | That Phanom | ธาตุพนม | Nakhon Phanom | นครพนม | North-East |
| That Phanom | ธาตุพนม | That Phanom | ธาตุพนม | Nakhon Phanom | นครพนม | North-East |
| That Thong | ธาตุทอง | Phu Khiao | ภูเขียว | Chaiyaphum | ชัยภูมิ | North-East |
| That Thong | ธาตุทอง | Sawang Daen Din | สว่างแดนดิน | Sakon Nakhon | สกลนคร | North-East |
| That Thong | ธาตุทอง | Bo Thong | บ่อทอง | Chonburi | ชลบุรี | East |
| Tha To | ท่าตอ | Maha Rat | มหาราช | Phra Nakhon Si Ayutthaya | พระนครศรีอยุธยา | Central |
| Thawat Buri | ธวัชบุรี | Thawat Buri | ธวัชบุรี | Roi Et | ร้อยเอ็ด | North-East |
| Thawi Watthana | ทวีวัฒนา | Sai Noi | ไทรน้อย | Nonthaburi | นนทบุรี | Central |
| Thawi Watthana | ทวีวัฒนา | Khet Thawi Watthana | ทวีวัฒนา | Bangkok | กรุงเทพมหานคร | Central |
| Thawon | ถาวร | Chaloem Phra Kiat | เฉลิมพระเกียรติ | Buriram | บุรีรัมย์ | North-East |
| Thawon Watthana | ถาวรวัฒนา | Sai Thong Watthana | ทรายทองวัฒนา | Kamphaeng Phet | กำแพงเพชร | Central |
| Thenmi | เทนมีย์ | Mueang Surin | เมืองสุรินทร์ | Surin | สุรินทร์ | North-East |
| Thep Khiri | เทพคีรี | Na Wang | นาวัง | Nong Bua Lamphu | หนองบัวลำภู | North-East |
| Thep Krasatti | เทพกระษัตรี | Thalang | ถลาง | Phuket | ภูเก็ต | South |
| Thep Nakhon | เทพนคร | Mueang Kamphaeng Phet | เมืองกำแพงเพชร | Kamphaeng Phet | กำแพงเพชร | Central |
| Thep Nimit | เทพนิมิต | Bueng Samakkhi | บึงสามัคคี | Kamphaeng Phet | กำแพงเพชร | Central |
| Thep Nimit | เทพนิมิต | Khao Saming | เขาสมิง | Trat | ตราด | East |
| Thep Nimit | เทพนิมิต | Pong Nam Ron | โป่งน้ำร้อน | Chanthaburi | จันทบุรี | East |
| Thep Raksa | เทพรักษา | Sangkha | สังขะ | Surin | สุรินทร์ | North-East |
| Thep Sadet | เทพเสด็จ | Doi Saket | ดอยสะเก็ด | Chiang Mai | เชียงใหม่ | North |
| Thepha | เทพา | Thepha (Malay: Tiba) | เทพา | Songkhla | สงขลา | South |
| Thephalai | เทพาลัย | Khong | คง | Nakhon Ratchasima | นครราชสีมา | North-East |
| Thepharak | เทพารักษ์ | Mueang Samut Prakan | เมืองสมุทรปราการ | Samut Prakan | สมุทรปราการ | Central |
| Thepphamongkhon | เทพมงคล | Bang Sai | บางซ้าย | Phra Nakhon Si Ayutthaya | พระนครศรีอยุธยา | Central |
| Theppharat | เทพราช | Ban Pho | บ้านโพธิ์ | Chachoengsao | ฉะเชิงเทรา | East |
| Theppharat | เทพราช | Sichon | สิชล | Nakhon Si Thammarat | นครศรีธรรมราช | South |
| Thewarat | เทวราช | Chaiyo | ไชโย | Ang Thong | อ่างทอง | Central |
| Thi Wang | ที่วัง | Thung Song | ทุ่งสง | Nakhon Si Thammarat | นครศรีธรรมราช | South |
| Thiang Thae | เที่ยงแท้ | Sankhaburi | สรรคบุรี | Chai Nat | ชัยนาท | Central |
| Thoen Buri | เถินบุรี | Thoen | เถิน | Lampang | ลำปาง | North |
| Thoet Thai | เทอดไทย | Mae Fa Luang | แม่ฟ้าหลวง | Chiang Rai | เชียงราย | North |
| Thoet Thai | เทอดไทย | Thung Khao Luang | ทุ่งเขาหลวง | Roi Et | ร้อยเอ็ด | North-East |
| Thom Na Ngam | ทมนางาม | Non Sa-at | โนนสะอาด | Udon Thani | อุดรธานี | North-East |
| Thon Hong | ทอนหงส์ | Phrom Khiri | พรหมคีรี | Nakhon Si Thammarat | นครศรีธรรมราช | South |
| Thon Na Lap | ถ่อนนาลับ | Ban Dung | บ้านดุง | Udon Thani | อุดรธานี | North-East |
| Thon Samo | ถอนสมอ | Tha Chang | ท่าช้าง | Sing Buri | สิงห์บุรี | Central |
| Thong Chai | ธงชัย | Bang Saphan | บางสะพาน | Prachuap Khiri Khan | ประจวบคีรีขันธ์ | West |
| Thong Chai | ธงชัย | Mueang Phetchaburi | เมืองเพชรบุรี | Phetchaburi | เพชรบุรี | West |
| Thong Chai Nuea | ธงชัยเหนือ | Pak Thong Chai | ปักธงชัย | Nakhon Ratchasima | นครราชสีมา | North-East |
| Thong En | ทองเอน | In Buri | อินทร์บุรี | Sing Buri | สิงห์บุรี | Central |
| Thong Fa | ท้องฟ้า | Ban Tak | บ้านตาก | Tak | ตาก | West |
| Thong Lamchiak | ท้องลำเจียก | Chian Yai | เชียรใหญ่ | Nakhon Si Thammarat | นครศรีธรรมราช | South |
| Thong Lang | ทองหลาง | Huai Khot | ห้วยคด | Uthai Thani | อุทัยธานี | Central |
| Thong Mongkhon | ทองมงคล | Bang Saphan | บางสะพาน | Prachuap Khiri Khan | ประจวบคีรีขันธ์ | West |
| Thong Nian | ท้องเนียน | Khanom | ขนอม | Nakhon Si Thammarat | นครศรีธรรมราช | South |
| Thong Thani | ธงธานี | Thawat Buri | ธวัชบุรี | Roi Et | ร้อยเอ็ด | North-East |
| Thonglang | ทองหลาง | Ban Mai Chaiyaphot | บ้านใหม่ไชยพจน์ | Buriram | บุรีรัมย์ | North-East |
| Thonglang | ทองหลาง | Chakkarat | จักราช | Nakhon Ratchasima | นครราชสีมา | North-East |
| Thonglang | ทองหลาง | Ban Na | บ้านนา | Nakhon Nayok | นครนายก | Central |
| Thothae | ท้อแท้ | Wat Bot | วัดโบสถ์ | Phitsanulok | พิษณุโลก | Central |
| Thum | ทุ่ม | Mueang Sisaket | เมืองศรีสะเกษ | Sisaket | ศรีสะเกษ | North-East |
| Thung | ทุ่ง | Chaiya | ไชยา | Surat Thani | สุราษฎร์ธานี | South |
| Thung Arun | ทุ่งอรุณ | Chok Chai | โชคชัย | Nakhon Ratchasima | นครราชสีมา | North-East |
| Thung Bencha | ทุ่งเบญจา | Tha Mai | ท่าใหม่ | Chanthaburi | จันทบุรี | East |
| Thung Bua | ทุ่งบัว | Kamphaeng Saen | กำแพงแสน | Nakhon Pathom | นครปฐม | Central |
| Thung Bulang | ทุ่งบุหลัง | Thung Wa | ทุ่งหว้า | Satun | สตูล | South |
| Thung Chai | ทุ่งไชย | Uthumphon Phisai | อุทุมพรพิสัย | Sisaket | ศรีสะเกษ | North-East |
| Thung Chang | ทุ่งช้าง | Thung Chang | ทุ่งช้าง | Nan | น่าน | North |
| Thung Changhan | ทุ่งจังหัน | Non Suwan | โนนสุวรรณ | Buriram | บุรีรัมย์ | North-East |
| Thung Chomphu | ทุ่งชมพู | Phu Wiang | ภูเวียง | Khon Kaen | ขอนแก่น | North-East |
| Thung Fai | ทุ่งฝาย | Mueang Lampang | เมืองลำปาง | Lampang | ลำปาง | North |
| Thung Fon | ทุ่งฝน | Thung Fon | ทุ่งฝน | Udon Thani | อุดรธานี | North-East |
| Thung Hong | ทุ่งโฮ้ง | Mueang Phrae | เมืองแพร่ | Phrae | แพร่ | North |
| Thung Hua | ทุ่งฮั้ว | Wang Nuea | วังเหนือ | Lampang | ลำปาง | North |
| Thung Hua Chang | ทุ่งหัวช้าง | Thung Hua Chang | ทุ่งหัวช้าง | Lamphun | ลำพูน | North |
| Thung Kae | ทุ่งแก | Charoen Sin | เจริญศิลป์ | Sakon Nakhon | สกลนคร | North-East |
| Thung Kae | ทุ่งแก | Phon Na Kaeo | โพนนาแก้ว | Sakon Nakhon | สกลนคร | North-East |
| Thung Kha | ทุ่งคา | Mueang Chumphon | เมืองชุมพร | Chumphon | ชุมพร | South |
| Thung Kha Ngok | ทุ่งคาโงก | Mueang Phang Nga | เมืองพังงา | Phang Nga | พังงา | South |
| Thung Kha Wat | ทุ่งคาวัด | Lamae | ละแม | Chumphon | ชุมพร | South |
| Thung Khaeo | ทุ่งแค้ว | Nong Muang Khai | หนองม่วงไข่ | Phrae | แพร่ | North |
| Thung Khai | ทุ่งค่าย | Yan Ta Khao | ย่านตาขาว | Trang | ตรัง | South |
| Thung Khamin | ทุ่งขมิ้น | Na Mom | นาหม่อม | Songkhla | สงขลา | South |
| Thung Khanan | ทุ่งขนาน | Soi Dao | สอยดาว | Chanthaburi | จันทบุรี | East |
| Thung Khao Luang | ทุ่งเขาหลวง | Thung Khao Luang | ทุ่งเขาหลวง | Roi Et | ร้อยเอ็ด | North-East |
| Thung Khao Phuang | ทุ่งข้าวพวง | Chiang Dao | เชียงดาว | Chiang Mai | เชียงใหม่ | North |
| Thung Khla | ทุ่งคล้า | Sai Buri (Malay: Telube or Selindung Bayu) | สายบุรี | Pattani | ปัตตานี | South |
| Thung Khli | ทุ่งคลี | Doem Bang Nang Buat | เดิมบางนางบวช | Suphan Buri | สุพรรณบุรี | Central |
| Thung Khlong | ทุ่งคลอง | Kham Muang | คำม่วง | Kalasin | กาฬสินธุ์ | North-East |
| Thung Khok | ทุ่งคอก | Song Phi Nong | สองพี่น้อง | Suphan Buri | สุพรรณบุรี | Central |
| Thung Khru | ทุ่งครุ | Khet Thung Khru | ทุ่งครุ | Bangkok | กรุงเทพมหานคร | Central |
| Thung Khwai Kin | ทุ่งควายกิน | Klaeng | แกลง | Rayong | ระยอง | East |
| Thung Khwang | ทุ่งขวาง | Phanat Nikhom | พนัสนิคม | Chonburi | ชลบุรี | East |
| Thung Khwang | ทุ่งขวาง | Kamphaeng Saen | กำแพงแสน | Nakhon Pathom | นครปฐม | Central |
| Thung Kluai | ทุ่งกล้วย | Phu Sang | ภูซาง | Phayao | พะเยา | North |
| Thung Ko | ทุ่งก่อ | Wiang Chiang Rung | เวียงเชียงรุ้ง | Chiang Rai | เชียงราย | North |
| Thung Kong | ทุ่งกง | Kanchanadit | กาญจนดิษฐ์ | Surat Thani | สุราษฎร์ธานี | South |
| Thung Krabam | ทุ่งกระบ่ำ | Lao Khwan | เลาขวัญ | Kanchanaburi | กาญจนบุรี | West |
| Thung Krabue | ทุ่งกระบือ | Yan Ta Khao | ย่านตาขาว | Trang | ตรัง | South |
| Thung Kracho | ทุ่งกระเชาะ | Ban Tak | บ้านตาก | Tak | ตาก | West |
| Thung Kraphang Hom | ทุ่งกระพังโหม | Kamphaeng Saen | กำแพงแสน | Nakhon Pathom | นครปฐม | Central |
| Thung Kratat Phatthana | ทุ่งกระตาดพัฒนา | Nong Ki | หนองกี่ | Buriram | บุรีรัมย์ | North-East |
| Thung Kraten | ทุ่งกระเต็น | Nong Ki | หนองกี่ | Buriram | บุรีรัมย์ | North-East |
| Thung Kula | ทุ่งกุลา | Tha Tum | ท่าตูม | Surin | สุรินทร์ | North-East |
| Thung Kula | ทุ่งกุลา | Suwannaphum | สุวรรณภูมิ | Roi Et | ร้อยเอ็ด | North-East |
| Thung Kwao | ทุ่งกวาว | Mueang Phrae | เมืองแพร่ | Phrae | แพร่ | North |
| Thung Kwao | ทุ่งกว๋าว | Mueang Pan | เมืองปาน | Lampang | ลำปาง | North |
| Thung Laeng | ทุ่งแล้ง | Long | ลอง | Phrae | แพร่ | North |
| Thung Lan | ทุ่งลาน | Khlong Hoi Khong | คลองหอยโข่ง | Songkhla | สงขลา | South |
| Thung Luang | ทุ่งหลวง | Suwannaphum | สุวรรณภูมิ | Roi Et | ร้อยเอ็ด | North-East |
| Thung Luang | ทุ่งหลวง | Pak Tho | ปากท่อ | Ratchaburi | ราชบุรี | West |
| Thung Luang | ทุ่งหลวง | Khiri Mat | คีรีมาศ | Sukhothai | สุโขทัย | Central |
| Thung Luang | ทุ่งหลวง | Phrao | พร้าว | Chiang Mai | เชียงใหม่ | North |
| Thung Luang | ทุ่งหลวง | Lamae | ละแม | Chumphon | ชุมพร | South |
| Thung Luang | ทุ่งหลวง | Wiang Sa | เวียงสระ | Surat Thani | สุราษฎร์ธานี | South |
| Thung Luang | ทุ่งหลวง | Phon Phisai | โพนพิสัย | Nong Khai | หนองคาย | North-East |
| Thung Luilai | ทุ่งลุยลาย | Khon San | คอนสาร | Chaiyaphum | ชัยภูมิ | North-East |
| Thung Luk Nok | ทุ่งลูกนก | Kamphaeng Saen | กำแพงแสน | Nakhon Pathom | นครปฐม | Central |
| Thung Maha Charoen | ทุ่งมหาเจริญ | Wang Nam Yen | วังน้ำเย็น | Sa Kaeo | สระแก้ว | East |
| Thung Maha Mek | ทุ่งมหาเมฆ | Khet Sathon | สาทร | Bangkok | กรุงเทพมหานคร | Central |
| Thung Maphrao | ทุ่งมะพร้าว | Thai Mueang | ท้ายเหมือง | Phang Nga | พังงา | South |
| Thung Mo | ทุ่งหมอ | Sadao (Malay: Sendawa) | สะเดา | Songkhla | สงขลา | South |
| Thung Mon | ทุ่งมน | Prasat | ปราสาท | Surin | สุรินทร์ | North-East |
| Thung Na Lao | ทุ่งนาเลา | Khon San | คอนสาร | Chaiyaphum | ชัยภูมิ | North-East |
| Thung Na Ngam | ทุ่งนางาม | Lan Sak | ลานสัก | Uthai Thani | อุทัยธานี | Central |
| Thung Na Thai | ทุ่งนาไทย | Thap Than | ทัพทัน | Uthai Thani | อุทัยธานี | Central |
| Thung Nao | ทุ่งน้าว | Song | สอง | Phrae | แพร่ | North |
| Thung Nari | ทุ่งนารี | Pa Bon | ป่าบอน | Phatthalung | พัทลุง | South |
| Thung Ngam | ทุ่งงาม | Soem Ngam | เสริมงาม | Lampang | ลำปาง | North |
| Thung Noi | ทุ่งน้อย | Mueang Nakhon Pathom | เมืองนครปฐม | Nakhon Phanom | นครพนม | North-East |
| Thung Noi | ทุ่งน้อย | Pho Thale | โพทะเล | Phichit | พิจิตร | Central |
| Thung Nonsi | ทุ่งนนทรี | Khao Saming | เขาสมิง | Trat | ตราด | East |
| Thung Nui | ทุ่งนุ้ย | Khuan Kalong | ควนกาหลง | Satun | สตูล | South |
| Thung Pha Suk | ทุ่งผาสุข | Chiang Kham | ชียงคำ | Phayao | พะเยา | North |
| Thung Phala | ทุ่งพลา | Khok Pho | โคกโพธิ์ | Pattani | ปัตตานี | South |
| Thung Phaya Thai | ทุ่งพญาไท | Khet Ratchathewi | ราชเทวี | Bangkok | กรุงเทพมหานคร | Central |
| Thung Pho | ทุ่งพอ | Saba Yoi (Malay: Sebayu) | สะบ้าย้อย | Songkhla | สงขลา | South |
| Thung Pho | ทุ่งโพ | Nong Chang | หนองฉาง | Uthai Thani | อุทัยธานี | Central |
| Thung Pho | ทุ่งโพธิ์ | Na Di | นาดี | Prachin Buri | ปราจีนบุรี | East |
| Thung Pho | ทุ่งโพธิ์ | Chulabhorn | จุฬาภรณ์ | Nakhon Si Thammarat | นครศรีธรรมราช | South |
| Thung Pho | ทุ่งโพธิ์ | Taphan Hin | ตะพานหิน | Phichit | พิจิตร | Central |
| Thung Phong | ทุ่งพง | Nong Chang | หนองฉาง | Uthai Thani | อุทัยธานี | Central |
| Thung Phra | ทุ่งพระ | Khon San | คอนสาร | Chaiyaphum | ชัยภูมิ | North-East |
| Thung Phraya | ทุ่งพระยา | Sanam Chai Khet | สนามชัยเขต | Chachoengsao | ฉะเชิงเทรา | East |
| Thung Phueng | ทุ่งผึ้ง | Chae Hom | แจ้ห่ม | Lampang | ลำปาง | North |
| Thung Phueng | ทุ่งพึ่ง | Nong Khayang | หนองขาหย่าง | Uthai Thani | อุทัยธานี | Central |
| Thung Pi | ทุ่งปี้ | Mae Wang | แม่วาง | Chiang Mai | เชียงใหม่ | North |
| Thung Pong | ทุ่งโป่ง | Ubolratana | อุบลรัตน์ | Khon Kaen | ขอนแก่น | North-East |
| Thung Prang | ทุ่งปรัง | Sichon | สิชล | Nakhon Si Thammarat | นครศรีธรรมราช | South |
| Thung Rang | ทุ่งรัง | Kanchanadit | กาญจนดิษฐ์ | Surat Thani | สุราษฎร์ธานี | South |
| Thung Raya | ทุ่งระยะ | Sawi | สวี | Chumphon | ชุมพร | South |
| Thung Ruang Thong | ทุ่งรวงทอง | Chun | จุน | Phayao | พะเยา | North |
| Thung Ruang Thong | ทุ่งรวงทอง | Mae Wang | แม่วาง | Chiang Mai | เชียงใหม่ | North |
| Thung Saeng Thong | ทุ่งแสงทอง | Nang Rong | นางรอง | Buriram | บุรีรัมย์ | North-East |
| Thung Sai | ทุ่งทราย | Sai Thong Watthana | ทรายทองวัฒนา | Kamphaeng Phet | กำแพงเพชร | Central |
| Thung Sai | ทุ่งใส | Sichon | สิชล | Nakhon Si Thammarat | นครศรีธรรมราช | South |
| Thung Sai Thong | ทุ่งไทรทอง | Lam Thap | ลำทับ | Krabi | กระบี่ | South |
| Thung Saliam | ทุ่งเสลี่ยม | Thung Saliam | ทุ่งเสลี่ยม | Sukhothai | สุโขทัย | Central |
| Thung Samo | ทุ่งสมอ | Khao Kho | เขาค้อ | Phetchabun | เพชรบูรณ์ | Central |
| Thung Samo | ทุ่งสมอ | Phanom Thuan | พนมทวน | Kanchanaburi | กาญจนบุรี | West |
| Thung Sang | ทุ่งสัง | Thung Yai | ทุ่งใหญ่ | Nakhon Si Thammarat | นครศรีธรรมราช | South |
| Thung Satok | ทุ่งสะโตก | San Pa Tong | สันป่าตอง | Chiang Mai | เชียงใหม่ | North |
| Thung Sawang | ทุ่งสว่าง | Prathai | ประทาย | Nakhon Ratchasima | นครราชสีมา | North-East |
| Thung Sawang | ทุ่งสว่าง | Mueang Chan | เมืองจันทร์ | Sisaket | ศรีสะเกษ | North-East |
| Thung Sawang | ทุ่งสว่าง | Wang Hin | วังหิน | Sisaket | ศรีสะเกษ | North-East |
| Thung Si | ทุ่งศรี | Rong Kwang | ร้องกวาง | Phrae | แพร่ | North |
| Thung Si Mueang | ทุ่งศรีเมือง | Suwannaphum | สุวรรณภูมิ | Roi Et | ร้อยเอ็ด | North-East |
| Thung Si Thong | ทุ่งศรีทอง | Wiang Sa | เวียงสา | Nan | น่าน | North |
| Thung Song | ทุ่งสง | Na Bon | นาบอน | Nakhon Si Thammarat | นครศรีธรรมราช | South |
| Thung Song Hong | ทุ่งสองห้อง | Khet Lak Si | หลักสี่ | Bangkok | กรุงเทพมหานคร | Central |
| Thung Sukhla | ทุ่งสุขลา | Si Racha | ศรีราชา | Chonburi | ชลบุรี | East |
| Thung Takhrai | ทุ่งตะไคร | Thung Tako | ทุ่งตะโก | Chumphon | ชุมพร | South |
| Thung Tam Sao | ทุ่งตำเสา | Hat Yai | หาดใหญ่ | Songkhla | สงขลา | South |
| Thung Tao | ทุ่งเตา | Ban Nà Sản | บ้านนาสาร | Surat Thani | สุราษฎร์ธานี | South |
| Thung Tao Mai | ทุ่งเตาใหม่ | Ban Nà Sản | บ้านนาสาร | Surat Thani | สุราษฎร์ธานี | South |
| Thung Tha Chang | ทุ่งท่าช้าง | Sa Bot | สระโบสถ์ | Lopburi | ลพบุรี | Central |
| Thung Thoeng | ทุ่งเทิง | Det Udom | เดชอุดม | Ubon Ratchathani | อุบลราชธานี | North-East |
| Thung Thong | ทุ่งทอง | Kaset Wisai | เกษตรวิสัย | Roi Et | ร้อยเอ็ด | North-East |
| Thung Thong | ทุ่งทอง | Sai Thong Watthana | ทรายทองวัฒนา | Kamphaeng Phet | กำแพงเพชร | Central |
| Thung Thong | ทุ่งทอง | Tha Muang | ท่าม่วง | Kanchanaburi | กาญจนบุรี | West |
| Thung Thong | ทุ่งทอง | Nong Bua | หนองบัว | Nakhon Sawan | นครสวรรค์ | Central |
| Thung To | ทุ่งต่อ | Huai Yot | ห้วยยอด | Trang | ตรัง | South |
| Thung Tom | ทุ่งต้อม | San Pa Tong | สันป่าตอง | Chiang Mai | เชียงใหม่ | North |
| Thung Wa | ทุ่งหว้า | Thung Wa | ทุ่งหว้า | Satun | สตูล | South |
| Thung Wang | ทุ่งวัง | Satuek | สตึก | Buriram | บุรีรัมย์ | North-East |
| Thung Wang | ทุ่งหวัง | Mueang Songkhla (Malay: Singgora) | เมืองสงขลา | Songkhla | สงขลา | South |
| Thung Wat Don | ทุ่งวัดดอน | Khet Sathon | สาทร | Bangkok | กรุงเทพมหานคร | Central |
| Thung Yai | ทุ่งใหญ่ | Hat Yai | หาดใหญ่ | Songkhla | สงขลา | South |
| Thung Yai | ทุ่งใหญ่ | Mueang Uthai Thani | เมืองอุทัยธานี | Uthai Thani | อุทัยธานี | Central |
| Thung Yai | ทุ่งใหญ่ | Thung Fon | ทุ่งฝน | Udon Thani | อุดรธานี | North-East |
| Thung Yai | ทุ่งใหญ่ | Kantharalak | กันทรลักษ์ | Sisaket | ศรีสะเกษ | North-East |
| Thung Yai | ทุ่งใหญ่ | Thung Yai | ทุ่งใหญ่ | Nakhon Si Thammarat | นครศรีธรรมราช | South |
| Thung Yai | ทุ่งใหญ่ | Pho Prathap Chang | โพธิ์ประทับช้าง | Phichit | พิจิตร | Central |
| Thung Yang | ทุ่งยั้ง | Laplae | ลับแล | Uttaradit | อุตรดิตถ์ | North |
| Thung Yang Mueang | ทุ่งยางเมือง | Khiri Mat | คีรีมาศ | Sukhothai | สุโขทัย | Central |
| Thung Yao | ทุ่งยาว | Palian | ปะเหลียน | Trang | ตรัง | South |
| Thung Yao | ทุ่งยาว | Pai | ปาย | Mae Hong Son | แม่ฮ่องสอน | North |
| To Deng | โต๊ะเด็ง | Su-ngai Padi (Malay: Sungai Padi) | สุไหงปาดี | Narathiwat | นราธิวาส | South |
| Toei | เตย | Muang Sam Sip | ม่วงสามสิบ | Ubon Ratchathani | อุบลราชธานี | North-East |
| Tok Phrom | ตกพรม | Khlung | ขลุง | Chanthaburi | จันทบุรี | East |
| Tolang | ตอหลัง | Yaring (Malay: Jamu) | ยะหริ่ง | Pattani | ปัตตานี | South |
| Ton Mamuang | ต้นมะม่วง | Mueang Phetchaburi | เมืองเพชรบุรี | Phetchaburi | เพชรบุรี | West |
| Ton Maphrao | ต้นมะพร้าว | Mueang Phetchaburi | เมืองเพชรบุรี | Phetchaburi | เพชรบุรี | West |
| Ton Pao | ต้นเปา | San Kamphaeng | สันกำแพง | Chiang Mai | เชียงใหม่ | North |
| Ton Pho | ต้นโพธิ์ | Mueang Sing Buri | เมืองสิงห์บุรี | Sing Buri | สิงห์บุรี | Central |
| Ton Phueng | ต้นผึ้ง | Phang Khon | พังโคน | Sakon Nakhon | สกลนคร | North-East |
| Ton Tan | ต้นตาล | Song Phi Nong | สองพี่น้อง | Suphan Buri | สุพรรณบุรี | Central |
| Ton Tan | ต้นตาล | Sao Hai | เสาไห้ | Saraburi | สระบุรี | Central |
| Ton Thong | ต้นธง | Mueang Lamphun | เมืองลำพูน | Lamphun | ลำพูน | North |
| Ton Thong Chai | ต้นธงชัย | Mueang Lampang | เมืองลำปาง | Lampang | ลำปาง | North |
| Ton Yuan | ต้นยวน | Phanom | พนม | Surat Thani | สุราษฎร์ธานี | South |
| Tong Khop | ตองโขบ | Khok Si Suphan | โคกศรีสุพรรณ | Sakon Nakhon | สกลนคร | North-East |
| Tong Pit | ตองปิด | Nam Kliang | น้ำเกลี้ยง | Sisaket | ศรีสะเกษ | North-East |
| Top Hu | ตบหู | Det Udom | เดชอุดม | Ubon Ratchathani | อุบลราชธานี | North-East |
| Trai Trueng | ไตรตรึงษ์ | Mueang Kamphaeng Phet | เมืองกำแพงเพชร | Kamphaeng Phet | กำแพงเพชร | Central |
| Trakan | ตระการ | Trakan Phuet Phon | ตระการพืชผล | Ubon Ratchathani | อุบลราชธานี | North-East |
| Trakat | ตระกาจ | Kantharalak | กันทรลักษ์ | Sisaket | ศรีสะเกษ | North-East |
| Tram Dom | ตรำดม | Lamduan | ลำดวน | Surin | สุรินทร์ | North-East |
| Trang | ตรัง | Mayo | มายอ | Pattani | ปัตตานี | South |
| Trasaeng | ตระแสง | Mueang Surin | เมืองสุรินทร์ | Surin | สุรินทร์ | North-East |
| Tri Narong | ตรีณรงค์ | Chaiyo | ไชโย | Ang Thong | อ่างทอง | Central |
| Tro Bon | เตราะบอน | Sai Buri (Malay: Telube or Selindung Bayu) | สายบุรี | Pattani | ปัตตานี | South |
| Trok Nong | ตรอกนอง | Khlung | ขลุง | Chanthaburi | จันทบุรี | East |
| Trom Phrai | ตรมไพร | Sikhoraphum | ศีขรภูมิ | Surin | สุรินทร์ | North-East |
| Truat | ตรวจ | Si Narong | ศรีณรงค์ | Surin | สุรินทร์ | North-East |
| Truem | ตรึม | Sikhoraphum | ศีขรภูมิ | Surin | สุรินทร์ | North-East |
| Tum | ตูม | Si Rattana | ศรีรัตนะ | Sisaket | ศรีสะเกษ | North-East |
| Tum | ตูม | Prang Ku | ปรางค์กู่ | Sisaket | ศรีสะเกษ | North-East |
| Tum | ตูม | Pak Thong Chai | ปักธงชัย | Nakhon Ratchasima | นครราชสีมา | North-East |
| Tum Tai | ตูมใต้ | Kumphawapi | กุมภวาปี | Udon Thani | อุดรธานี | North-East |
| Tum Yai | ตูมใหญ่ | Khu Mueang | คูเมือง | Buriram | บุรีรัมย์ | North-East |
| Tuyong | ตุยง | Nong Chik | หนองจิก | Pattani | ปัตตานี | South |

== See also ==
- Organization of the government of Thailand
- List of districts of Thailand
- List of districts of Bangkok
- List of tambon in Thailand
- Provinces of Thailand
- List of municipalities in Thailand
