= Tha Kham =

Tha Kham may refer to:

- Tha Kham, Bangkok, a subdistrict (khwaeng) of Bang Khun Thian district
- Tha Kham, Chiang Mai, a subdistrict municipality (thesaban tambon) of Hot district
- Tha Kham, Chiang Rai, a subdistrict (tambon) of Wiang Kaen district
- Tha Kham, Chumphon, a subdistrict (tambon) of Tha Sae district
- Tha Kham, Surat Thani, a town municipality and subdistrict (tambon) of Phunphin district

== See also ==
- List of tambon in Thailand (T)
