= Nirut Sonkhamhan =

Thai serial killer

- Born: 5 August 1969; Nong Kung Si district, Kalasin province, Thailand
- Died: 18 April 2012 (aged 42); Khlong Wan Police Station, Prachuap Khiri Khan province, Thailand
- Cause of death: Suicide by hanging
- Other name: "The Pickup Truck Killer"
- Conviction: N/A
- Penalty: N/A

Details
- Victims: 6
- Span of crimes: 2011–2012
- Country: Thailand
- States: Kalasin, Prachuap Kiri Khan, Surat Thani, Chumphon
- Date apprehended: 16 April 2012

Nirut Sonkhamhan (Thai: นิรุต สอนคำหาร; 5 August 1969 – 18 April 2012), known as The Pickup Truck Killer (Thai: ฆาตกรรถกระบะ), was a Thai serial killer who poisoned nine taxi drivers from 2011 to 2012, six of which died as a result. Sonkhamhan was arrested and charged with the murders, but hanged himself in his jail cell before he could go to trial.

== Early life ==
Nirut Sonkhamhan was born on 5 August 1969, in the Nong Kung Si district. When he was ten years old, he moved with his father to Songkhla, where Sonkhamhan remained until the age of 25 when he moved to the village of Khok Krua. There, he married and started a family, and found a job as a taxi driver, but experienced financial difficulties due to his gambling habits.

== Murders ==
As part of his modus operandi, Sonkhamhan would hire taxi drivers to help him move things to various locations with whom he would ride. Along the way, he would stop at a gas station and order coffee, which he would then poison with pesticide. After the victim was either incapacitated or dead, Sonkhanham would dump their body by the roadside and then sell the vehicle to a gang of car thieves in the Hat Yai district.

On January 11, 2011, the body of the first victim, 67-year-old Yupin Jeonkhem, was found floating in the Lampao Dam, having been weighed down with cement blocks. By examining fingerprints imprinted in front of the victim's house, police determined that the perpetrator was Sonkhamhan, and an arrest warrant was subsequently issued for his arrest.

The next attack came in March when Sonkhamhan poisoned Montree Kalam in Prachuap Khiri Khan, who survived through his injury. After that, he poisoned Nairob Prathon in Surat Thani and dumped his body in a palm plantation, before selling his Toyota Hilux to the car thieves.

On January 3, 2012, Sonkhamhan supposedly poisoned and robbed a man named Watchara Suebchuea, whose body he dumped off a bridge between the Sawi and Thung Tako districts, but the body was never located. Later that month, Sonkhamhan attempted to do the same to a taxi driver named Charoen Daranoi, who realized that he was being poisoned and kicked him out of the car before speeding away. At the very end of January, he poisoned his sixth victim, Paitoon Pattalapho, whom he dumped at a sugarcane plantation in the Cha-am district, unaware that he had survived.

For the following three months, Sonkhamhan successfully poisoned three additional victims: the first was Julsil Salangsing, whose body was found in the Tha Sae district. For the fifth murder, during which Sonkhamhan reportedly brought along his wife, he killed Chamnong Srirachat, whose body was dumped in a grove near a canal in the Mueang Chumphon district on March 18. The final victim was a man named Somsak Srichampa, whose body was found along the Petchkasem Road in the Khlong Wan subdistrict in Prachuap Khiri Khan on April 9.

=== Arrest ===
After reviewing CCTV footage of the client last seen with the victims and Srichampa's stolen car, authorities tracked down Sonkhamhan to a hotel room in the Sam Phran district, where the Crime Suppression Division subsequently arrested him. He was subsequently brought to the Khlong Wan Police Station and put in solitary confinement, where he attempted to hang himself with an electric cord on April 17, 2012, but was saved after prison guards found him and cut it off.

On the following day, after excusing himself to the bathroom, Sonkhamhan ripped off a piece of his T-shirt and tied it to the bars of the bathroom window and around his neck before he climbed onto the toilet tank and jumped off. This was noticed by the prison guards, who again cut off the cloth and attempted to resuscitate him, but to no avail.

== See also ==
- List of serial killers by country
