= Tha Chang =

Tha Chang may refer to:

== Amphoe ==
There are two amphoe named Tha Chang in Thailand, which, however, have two different Thai spellings. It could refer to:

- Amphoe Tha Chang, Surat Thani Province (ท่าฉาง)
- Amphoe Tha Chang, Sing Buri Province (ท่าช้าง)
- Amphoe Ban Lat, Phetchaburi Province, was named Tha Chang (ท่าช้าง) till 1939
- Amphoe Chakkarat, Nakhon Ratchasima Province, was named Tha Chang (ท่าช้าง) till 1953

== Other ==
- Tha Chang subdistrict in Phrom Phiram, Phitsanulok
- Tha Chang subdistrict in Chaloem Phra Kiat, Nakhon Ratchasima
- Tha Chang Pier, pier on Chao Phraya River in Phra Nakhon District, Bangkok

== See also ==
- List of tambon in Thailand – T
- Chang (disambiguation)
