= Tha Mai, Kanchanaburi =

Tha Mai ท่าไม้
- Tambon
- Location in Thailand
- Coordinates: 13.8865°N 99.8010°E
- Country: Thailand
- Province: Kanchanaburi
- Amphoe: Tha Maka

Population (2017)
  - Total: 9,411
- Time zone: UTC+7 (ICT)
- Postal code: 71120
- TIS 1099: 710504

Tha Mai (Thai: ท่าไม้, pronounced [tʰâː máːj]) is a tambon (subdistrict) of Tha Maka District, in Kanchanaburi Province, Thailand. In 2017 it had a total population of 9,411 people.
