= Bang Sai district =

There are two districts (amphoe) romanized as Bang Sai in the Phra Nakhon Si Ayutthaya Province, Thailand, differed only by the Thai spelling and the geocode

- Amphoe Bang Sai (1404) (บางไทร)
- Amphoe Bang Sai (1413) (บางซ้าย)
