= Thawon Watthana =

Thawon Watthana ถาวรวัฒนา
- Tambon
- Interactive map of Thawon Watthana
- Coordinates: 16.292°N 99.916°E
- Country: Thailand
- Province: Kamphaeng Phet
- Amphoe: Sai Thong Watthana

Population (2019)
  - Total: 6,632
- Time zone: UTC+7 (TST)
- Postal code: 62190
- TIS 1099: 620803

Thawon Watthana (Thai: ถาวรวัฒนา, pronounced [tʰǎː.wɔ̄ːn wát.tʰā.nāː]) is a tambon (subdistrict) of Sai Thong Watthana District, in Kamphaeng Phet Province, Thailand. In 2019 it had a total population of 6,632 people.

== History ==
The subdistrict was created effective August 1, 1984 by splitting off 8 administrative villages from Wang Khaem.

== Administration ==
=== Central administration ===
The tambon is subdivided into 10 administrative villages (muban).

No.	Name	Thai
1.	Ban Thawon Watthana	บ้านถาวรวัฒนา
2.	Ban Thanon Yai	บ้านถนนใหญ่
3.	Ban Chum Nak	บ้านชุมนาก
4.	Ban Khlong Ruea	บ้านคลองเรือ
5.	Ban Thanon Noi	บ้านถนนน้อย
6.	Ban Sap Charoen	บ้านทรัพย์เจริญ
7.	Ban Bueng Samran	บ้านบึงสำราญ
8.	Ban Bueng Samran Noi	บ้านบึงสำราญน้อย
9.	Ban Khlong Pla Ra	บ้านคลองปลาร้า
10.	Ban Bueng Lom	บ้านบึงหล่ม

=== Local administration ===
The whole area of the subdistrict is covered by the subdistrict administrative organization (SAO) Thawon Watthana (องค์การบริหารส่วนตำบลถาวรวัฒนา).
