= Than Tawan =

Than Tawan ทานตะวัน
- Tambon
- Country: Thailand
- Province: Chiang Rai
- Amphoe: Phan

Population (2005)
  - Total: 6,518
- Time zone: UTC+7 (Thailand)

Than Tawan (Thai: ทานตะวัน) is a village and tambon (subdistrict) of Phan District, in Chiang Rai Province, Thailand. In 2005 it had a total population of 6,518 people. The tambon contains 11 villages.
