= Thung Luang, Chiang Mai =

Thung Luang ทุ่งหลวง
- Tambon
- Country: Thailand
- Province: Chiang Mai
- District: Phrao

Population (2005)
  - Total: 1,821
- Time zone: UTC+7 (ICT)

Thung Luang (Thai: ทุ่งหลวง) is a tambon (subdistrict) of Phrao District, in Chiang Mai Province, Thailand. In 2005 it had a population of 1,821 people. The tambon contains six villages.
