= Tha Kham, Chumphon =

Coordinates: 10.581730°N 99.114797°E

Tha Kham (Thai: ท่าข้าม) is one tambon (sub-district) in Tha Sae District, Chumphon Province, southern Thailand.

== History ==
Tha Kham is a sub-district with a history that goes back to the reign of King Chulalongkorn (Rama V) in 1897. In those days, Phra Thep Chai Burin as a Tha Sae governor, Tha Kham, also known as Ban Tha Kham was lined along the Khlong Rap Ro canal between the temples Wat Nok, Wat Nai, and Wat Lahan.

Since the past, Tha Kham was a means of transportation between different places, which was a crossing pier. Hence the name "Tha Kham" came from the word "crossing pier" or "crossing road" until now.

Presently, Tha Kham continues to be important as a largest rest stop for both buses and private cars for those traveling between Bangkok and the southern provinces. It serves the restaurant, toilets and bathrooms, souvenir shops, convenience stores as well as prayer room, etc.

== Geography ==
The terrain of Tha Kham is a plateau, consists of high and low hills, with a Khlong Rap Ro flowing through the area. Tha Kham is about 21 km (13 mi) from the Tha Sae District Office.

Neighbouring sub-districts are (from north clockwise): Tha Sae and Khuring, Rap Ro and Hin Kaeo, Hat Phan Krai, Na Kratam, respectively. All of them are in its district except Hat Phan Krai in the Mueang Chumphon District.

== Administration ==
The area of the subdistrict is governed by Subdistrict Administrative Organization (SAO) Tha Kham (องค์การบริหารส่วนตำบลท่าข้าม).

== Economy ==
Most of residents work in fruit gardening. Employment is a part-time job.

== Transportation ==
The area has convenient transportation to nearby districts, Mueang Chumphon District via Highway 4 (Phet Kasem Road), including continuity in the area and nearby sub-districts. Road of Tha Kham is a network divided into 5 asphalt roads, 86 non-asphalt roads, 3 asphalt concrete roads.

== Places ==
- Khun Sarai Restaurant & Rest Area
- Wat Kham Rap Ro
