= Thung Thong, Sai Thong Watthana =

Thung Thong ทุ่งทอง
- Tambon
- Interactive map of Thung Thong
- Coordinates: 16°20′36″N 99°51′37″E
- Country: Thailand
- Province: Kamphaeng Phet
- Amphoe: Sai Thong Watthana

Population (2019)
  - Total: 7,268
- Time zone: UTC+7 (TST)
- Postal code: 62190
- TIS 1099: 620802

Thung Thong (Thai: ทุ่งทอง, pronounced [tʰûŋ tʰɔ̄ːŋ]) is a tambon (subdistrict) of Sai Thong Watthana District, in Kamphaeng Phet Province, Thailand. In 2019 it had a total population of 7,268 people.

== History ==
The subdistrict was created effective August 1, 1984 by splitting off 8 administrative villages from Thung Sai.

== Administration ==
=== Central administration ===
The tambon is subdivided into 11 administrative villages (muban).

No.	Name	Thai
1.	Ban Non Chan	บ้านโนนจั่น
2.	Ban Non Sawan	บ้านโนนสวรรค์
3.	Ban Khlong Ton Sai	บ้านคลองต้นไทร
4.	Ban Khlong Suk Chai	บ้านคลองสุขใจ
5.	Ban Mai Thung Thong	บ้านใหม่ทุ่งทอง
6.	Ban Thung Thong	บ้านทุ่งทอง
7.	Ban Dong Charoen	บ้านดงเจริญ
8.	Ban Noen Sa-nga	บ้านเนินสง่า
9.	Ban Ubon Samakkhi	บ้านอุบลสามัคคี
10.	Ban Khlong Suk Chai Nuea	บ้านคลองสุขใจเหนือ
11.	Ban Sai Thong	บ้านทรายทอง

=== Local administration ===
The whole area of the subdistrict is covered by the subdistrict administrative organization (SAO) Thung Thong (องค์การบริหารส่วนตำบลทุ่งทอง).
