= Than Thong =

Coordinates: 19.7138°N 99.7172°E

Than Thong ธารทอง
- Tambon
- Interactive map of Than Thong
- Country: Thailand
- Province: Chiang Rai
- District: Phan

Population (2005)
  - Total: 6,636
- Time zone: UTC+7 (ICT)

Than Thong (Thai: ธารทอง) is a village and tambon (subdistrict) of Phan District, in Chiang Rai Province, Thailand. In 2005 it had a population of 6,636 people. The tambon contains 11 villages.
