= Thung Sai, Sai Thong Watthana =

Thung Sai ทุ่งทราย
- Tambon
- Interactive map of Thung Sai
- Coordinates: 16°17′44″N 99°48′32″E
- Country: Thailand
- Province: Kamphaeng Phet
- Amphoe: Sai Thong Watthana

Population (2019)
  - Total: 9,509
- Time zone: UTC+7 (TST)
- Postal code: 62190
- TIS 1099: 620801

Thung Sai (Thai: ทุ่งทราย, pronounced [tʰûŋ sāːj]) is a tambon (subdistrict) of Sai Thong Watthana District, in Kamphaeng Phet Province, Thailand. In 2019 it had a total population of 9,509 people.

== History ==
The subdistrict was created effective September 15, 1972 by splitting off 7 administrative villages from Wang Yang.

== Administration ==
=== Central administration ===
The tambon is subdivided into 17 administrative villages (muban).

| No. | Name | Thai |
|---|---|---|
| 1. | Ban Thung Sai | บ้านทุ่งทราย |
| 2. | Ban Nong Nok Khum | บ้านหนองนกชุม |
| 3. | Ban Wang Nam Daeng Nuea | บ้านวังน้ำแดงเหนือ |
| 4. | Ban Sam Chop | บ้านสามจบ |
| 5. | Ban Non Tak Daet | บ้านทุ่งตากแดด |
| 6. | Ban Noi | บ้านน้อย |
| 7. | Ban Nong Phai | บ้านหนองไผ่ |
| 8. | Ban Nong Phai Nuea | บ้านหนองไผ่เหนือ |
| 9. | Ban Sai Yoi | บ้านไทรย้อย |
| 10. | Ban Thung Sai Klang | บ้านทุ่งทรายกลาง |
| 11. | Ban Thung Sai Ok | บ้านทุ่งทรายออก |
| 12. | Ban Si Sakuna | บ้านศรีสกุณา |
| 13. | Ban Nong Nok Khum Tai | บ้านหนองนกชุมใต้ |
| 14. | Ban Wang Nam Daeng Tai | บ้านวังน้ำแดงใต้ |
| 15. | Ban Thung Sai Nuea | บ้านทุ่งทรายเหนือ |
| 16. | Ban Rom Yen | บ้านร่มเย็น |
| 17. | Ban Wang Nam Daeng | บ้านวังน้ำแดง |

=== Local administration ===
The whole area of the subdistrict is covered by the subdistrict municipality (Thesaban Tambon) Thung Sai (เทศบาลตำบลทุ่งทราย).
