= Thep Mongkhon =

Thep Mongkhon เทพมงคล
- Tambon
- Country: Thailand
- Province: Phra Nakhon Si Ayutthaya
- Amphoe: Bang Sai

Population (2017)
  - Total: 3,851
- Time zone: UTC+7 (ICT)
- Postal code: 13270
- TIS 1099: 141305

Thep Mongkhon (Thai: เทพมงคล, pronounced [tʰêːp mōŋ.kʰōn]) is a tambon (subdistrict) of Bang Sai District, in Phra Nakhon Si Ayutthaya Province, Thailand. In 2017 it had a total population of 3,851 people.

== Administration ==
=== Central administration ===
The tambon is subdivided into 8 administrative villages (muban).

No.	Name	Thai
1.	Ban Nong Phangphuai	บ้านหนองพังพวย
2.	Ban Bueng Krasang	บ้านบึงกระสังข์
3.	Ban Phaeng Loi	บ้านแผงลอย
4.	Ban Rang Ai Thuem	บ้านรางอ้ายทึม
5.	Ban Thep Mongkhon	บ้านเทพมงคล
6.	Ban Nong Khot	บ้านหนองคต
7.	Ban Khok Huai	บ้านโคกห้วย
8.	Ban Rang Nuea Tai	บ้านรางเนื้อตาย

=== Local administration ===
The whole area of the subdistrict is covered by the subdistrict administrative organization (SAO) Thep Mongkhon (องค์การบริหารส่วนตำบลเทพมงคล).
