= Sai Thong Watthana district =

Sai Thong Watthana ทรายทองวัฒนา
- District
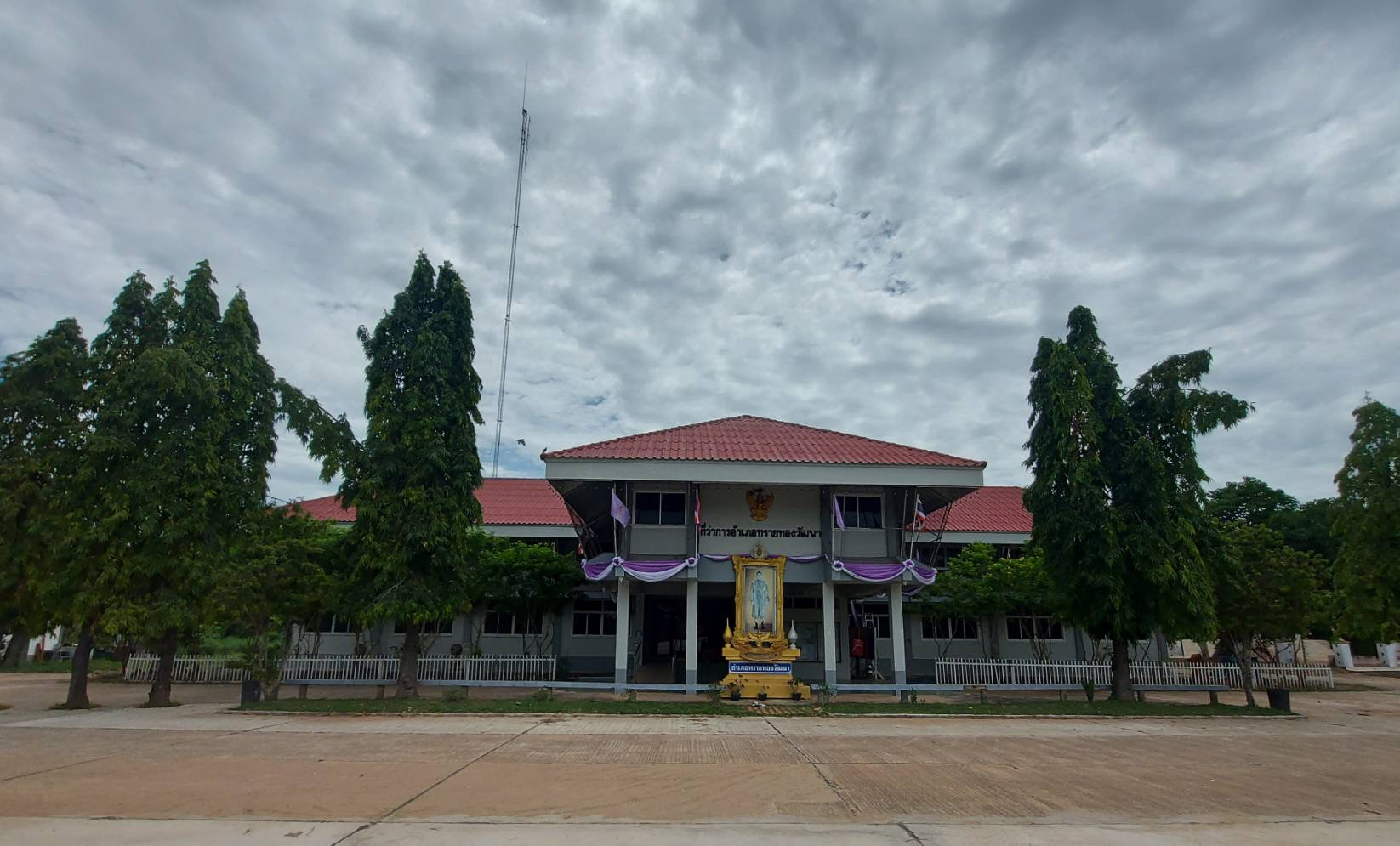
- Sai Thong Watthana District office

- District location in Kamphaeng Phet province
- Coordinates: 16°18′44″N 99°49′52″E
- Country: Thailand
- Province: Kamphaeng Phet
- Seat: Thung Sai

Area
  - Total: 253.0 km^{2} (97.7 sq mi)

Population (2005)
  - Total: 23,971
  - Density: 94.7/km^{2} (245/sq mi)
- Time zone: UTC+7 (ICT)
- Postal code: 62190
- Geocode: 6208

Sai Thong Watthana (Thai: ทรายทองวัฒนา, pronounced [sāːj tʰɔ̄ːŋ wát.tʰā.nāː]) is a district (amphoe) of Kamphaeng Phet province, central Thailand.

== Geography ==
Neighbouring districts are (from the south clockwise): Bueng Samakkhi, Khlong Khlung, and Sai Ngam of Kamphaeng Phet Province; and Sam Ngam of Phichit province.

== History ==
The minor district (king amphoe) was established on 1 April 1992 by splitting off three tambons from Khlong Khlung district. Originally named Thung Sai after the central tambon, it was renamed Sai Thong Watthana in 1995. It was upgraded to a full district on 11 October 1997.

== Administration ==
=== Central administration ===
The district Sai Thong Watthana is subdivided into 3 subdistricts (Tambon), which are further subdivided into 38 administrative villages (Muban).

No.	Name	Thai	Villages	Pop.
1.	Thung Sai	ทุ่งทราย	17	9,509
2.	Thung Thong	ทุ่งทอง	11	7,268
3.	Thawon Watthana	ถาวรวัฒนา	10	6,632

=== Local administration ===
There is one subdistrict municipality (Thesaban Tambon) in the district:

- Thung Sai (Thai: เทศบาลตำบลทุ่งทราย) consisting of the complete subdistrict Thung Sai.

There are 2 subdistrict administrative organizations (SAO) in the district:

- Thung Thong (Thai: องค์การบริหารส่วนตำบลทุ่งทอง) consisting of the complete subdistrict Thung Thong.
- Thawon Watthana (Thai: องค์การบริหารส่วนตำบลถาวรวัฒนา) consisting of the complete subdistrict Thawon Watthana.
