= Tha Ko =

Tha Ko ท่าก๊อ
- Tambon
- Country: Thailand
- Province: Chiang Rai
- District: Mae Suai

Population (2005)
  - Total: 18,597
- Time zone: UTC+7 (ICT)

Tha Ko (Thai: ท่าก๊อ) is a village and tambon (sub-district) of Mae Suai District, in Chiang Rai Province, Thailand. In 2005 it had a population of 18,597 people. The tambon contains 27 villages.
