= Tha Kham, Chiang Rai =

Coordinates: 20.0561°N 100.5053°E

Tha Kham ท่าข้าม
- Tambon
- Interactive map of Tha Kham
- Country: Thailand
- Province: Chiang Rai
- District: Wiang Kaen

Population (2005)
  - Total: 5,425
- Time zone: UTC+7 (ICT)

Tha Kham (Thai: ท่าข้าม) is a village and tambon (subdistrict) of Wiang Kaen District, in Chiang Rai Province, Thailand. In 2005 it had a population of 5,425 people. The tambon contains six villages.
