= Tha Sae district =

Tha Sae ท่าแซะ
- District
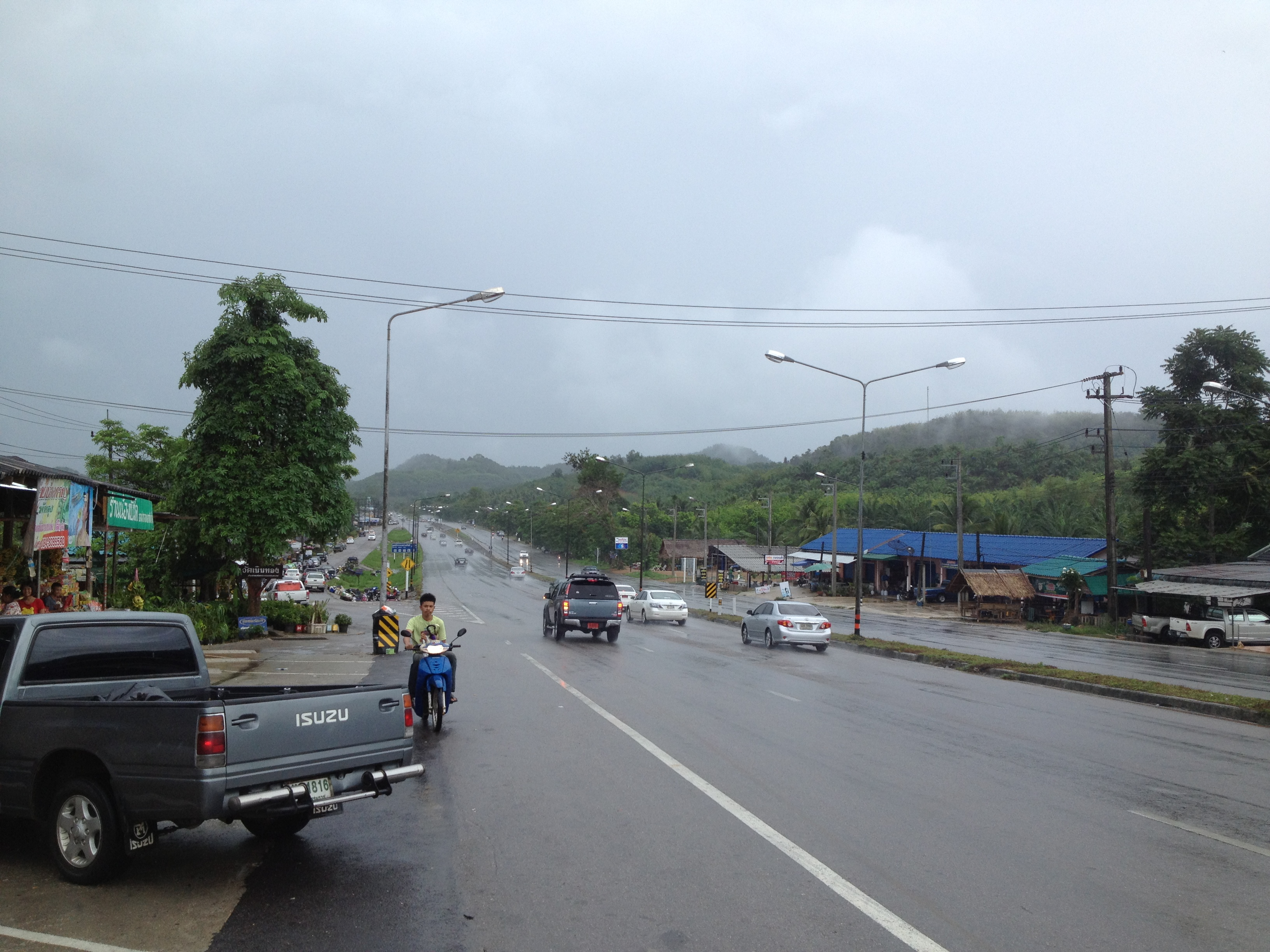
- Phetkasem Road (Highway 4) km 453-454 near Pho Ta Hin Chang Shrine, Tha Sae

- District location in Chumphon province
- Coordinates: 10°39′54″N 99°10′24″E
- Country: Thailand
- Province: Chumphon
- Seat: Tha Sae

Area
  - Total: 1,485.0 km^{2} (573.4 sq mi)

Population (2005)
  - Total: 76,947
  - Density: 51.8/km^{2} (134/sq mi)
- Time zone: UTC+7 (ICT)
- Postal code: 86140
- Geocode: 8602

Tha Sae (Thai: ท่าแซะ, pronounced [tʰâː sɛ́ʔ]) is a district (amphoe) in the northwestern part of Chumphon province, southern Thailand.

== History ==
Mueang Tha Sae was under Mueang Chumphon, with its governor having the rank phra. King Chulalongkorn downgraded Mueang Tha Sae to a district of Chumphon Province. In 1920 the government downgraded Tha Sae to a minor district (king amphoe) of Pathio district. It was officially upgraded to a full district again in 1940.

The district name originates from the public canal pier (in Thai: tha), where plenty of catechu trees (Callerya atropurpurea) grow.

== Geography ==
Neighboring districts are (from the north clockwise) Bang Saphan Noi of Prachuap Khiri Khan province, Pathio and Mueang Chumphon of Chumphon Province, and Kra Buri of Ranong province. To the west is the Tanintharyi Division of Myanmar.

The important water resources are the Tha Sae and Rap Ro Rivers.

== Administration ==
The district is divided into 10 sub-districts (tambons), which are further subdivided into 116 villages (mubans). Tha Sae is a township (thesaban tambon) covering parts of the tambon Tha Sea. Noen Sam Thi covers further parts of tambon Tha Sae. There are a further 10 tambon administrative organizations (TAO).

No.	Name	Thai	Villages	Pop.
1.	Tha Sae	ท่าแซะ	18	10,726
2.	Khuring	คุริง	7	3,411
3.	Salui	สลุย	8	7,425
4.	Na Kratam	นากระตาม	11	5,049
5.	Rap Ro	รับร่อ	23	16,128
6.	Tha Kham	ท่าข้าม	15	6,823
7.	Hong Charoen	หงษ์เจริญ	14	10,963
8.	Hin Kaeo	หินแก้ว	6	4,303
9.	Sap Anan	ทรัพย์อนันต์	7	3,854
10.	Song Phi Nong	สองพี่น้อง	7	8,265

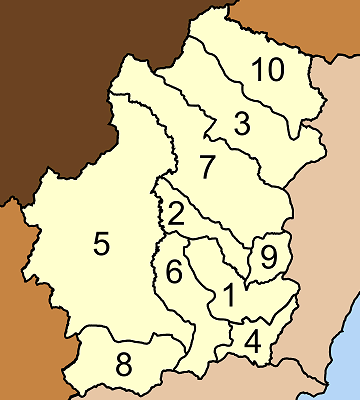

== Economy ==
The coffee-growing valley of Ban Panwal in the district includes 178,283 rai of robusta coffee plantations. It produces more than 24 million tonnes a year. Chumphon Province contributes 60 percent of Thailand's total coffee production, much of it from here. Local brands include Thamsing, ST Chumphon, and Khao Tha-Lu Chumporn.
