= Tha Maka district =

Tha Maka ท่ามะกา
- District
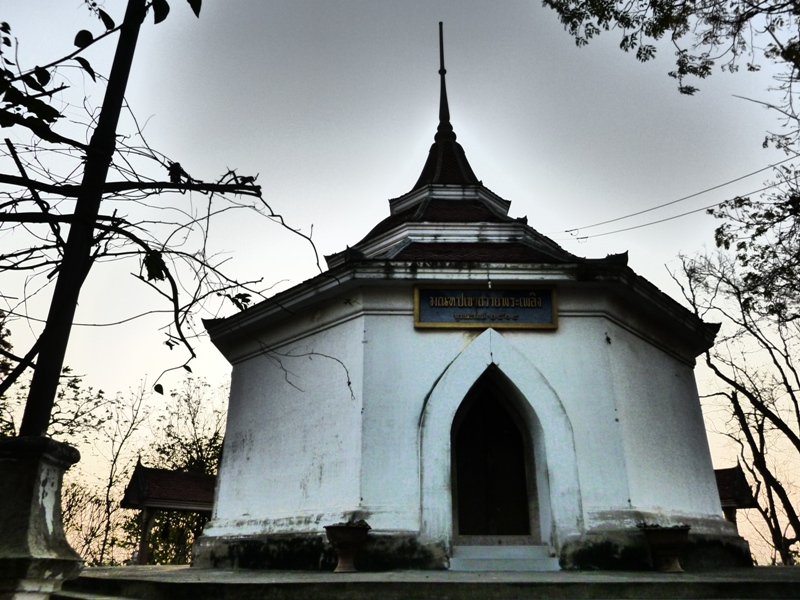
- Wat Phra Thaen Dong Rang

- District location in Kanchanaburi province
- Coordinates: 13°55′15″N 99°45′56″E
- Country: Thailand
- Province: Kanchanaburi
- Seat: Tha Maka

Area
  - Total: 341 km^{2} (132 sq mi)

Population (2024)
  - Total: 131,797
  - Density: 386/km^{2} (1,000/sq mi)
- Time zone: UTC+7 (ICT)
- Postal code: 71120 + 71130 + 70190
- Calling code: 034
- ISO 3166 code: TH-7105

Tha Maka (Thai: ท่ามะกา, pronounced [tʰâː má.kāː]) is the southeasternmost district (amphoe) of Kanchanaburi province, central Thailand and is located west of Bangkok.

== Geography ==
Neighbouring districts are (from the west clockwise) Tha Muang, Phanom Thuan of Kanchanaburi Province, Song Phi Nong of Suphanburi province, Kamphaeng San of Nakhon Pathom province, and Ban Pong of Ratchaburi province.

The important water resource is the Mae Klong River.

== Administration ==
=== Provincial administration ===
The district is divided into seventeen subdistricts (tambons), which are further subdivided into 154 administrative villages (mubans).

No.	Subdistrict	Thai	Villages	Pop.
1.	Phong Tuek	พงตึก	6	4,077
2.	Yang Muang	ยางม่วง	9	6,740
3.	Don Cha-em	ดอนชะเอม	10	7,197
4.	Tha Mai	ท่าไม้	10	8,884
5.	Takhram En	ตะคร้ำเอน	16	18,745
6.	Tha Maka	ท่ามะกา	11	13,636
7.	Tha Ruea	ท่าเริอ	-	5,301
8.	Khok Tabong	โคกตะบอง	8	3,989
9.	Don Khamin	ดอนขมิ้น	9	7,604
10.	Ulok Si Muen	อุโลกสี่หมืน	8	7,083
11.	Khao Samsip Hap	เขาสามสิบหาบ	8	5,957
12.	Phra Thaen	พระแท่น	16	9,817
13.	Wai Niao	หวายเหนียว	7	6,638
14.	Saen To	แสนตอ	13	9,171
15.	Sanam Yae	สนามแย้	7	7,022
16.	Tha Sao	ท่าเสา	8	5,193
17.	Nong Lan	หนองลาน	8	4,743
		Total	154	131,797

=== Local government ===
==== Municipalities ====
As of December 2024 there are: nine municipal (thesaban) areas in the district: Tha Ruea Phra Thaen (ท่าเรือพระแท่น) is a town municipality (thesaban mueang) and covers parts of Tha Ruea and Takhram En subdistricts. Further there are eight subdistrict municipalities (thesaban tambons) of which Nong Lan and Tha Mai both cover the whole subdistrict; Phra Thaen and Phra Thaen Lam Phraya cover the entire Phra Thaen subdistrict; Don Khamin, Wai Niao and Tha Maka cover parts of the same named subdistrict.

Tha Ruea Phra Thaen town municipality	Pop.	04710501	trpcity.go.th
Tha Ruea	5,301		
Takhram En	5,056		
Total	10,357		

Subdistrict municipality	Pop.	LAO code	website
Tha Mai	8,884	05710504	thamaikan.go.th
Tha Maka	8,027	05710503	thamaka.go.th
Phra Thaen	6,195	05710505	pratancity.go.th
Nong Lan	4,743	05710502	nonglan.go.th
Wai Niao	4,389	05710507	whaynieo.go.th
Don Khamin	4,299	05710508	donkhamin.go.th
Phra Thaen Lam Phraya	3,622	05710520	pratanlumpraya.go.th

Luk Kae subdistrict mun.	Pop.	05710506	lukkae.go.th
Don Khamin	3,305		

==== Subdistrict administrative organizations ====
The non-municipal areas are administered by twelve subdistrict administrative organizations - SAO (ongkan borihan suan tambon - o bo toh).

Subdistrict adm.org - SAO	Pop.	LAO code	website
Takhram En SAO	13,689	06710509	takram-en.go.th
Saen To SAO	9,171	06710513	saentor.go.th
Don Cha-em SAO	7,197	06710516	donchaem.go.th
Ulok Si Muen	7,083	06710521	uloksemun.com
Sanam Yae SAO	7,022	06710512	sanamyae.go.th
Yang Muang SAO	6,740	06710511	yangmuang.go.th
Khao Samsip Hap SAO	5,957	06710514	khaosamsibhab.go.th
Tha Maka SAO	5,609	06710517	tamaka.go.th
Tha Sao SAO	5,193	06710518	thasao-tmk.go.th
Phong Tuek SAO	4,077	06710519	pongtuk.go.th
Khok Tabong SAO	3,989	06710515	khoktabong.go.th
Wai Niao SAO	2,249	06710510	wnsao.go.th

== Education ==
- 56 primary schools
- 7 secondary schools

== Healthcare ==
=== Hospital ===
Tha Maka district is served by two hospitals

- Makarak Hospital with 280 beds.
- Tha Ruea Hospital with 29 beds.

=== Health promoting hospitals ===
In the district there are fifteen health-promoting hospitals in total; except for Tha Maka and Tha Ruea, all subdistricts have a health promoting hospital.

== Religion ==
There are forty-six Theravada Buddhist temples in the district.

1 Ulok Si Muen	1 Wai Niao	2 Don Khamin	2 Khok Tabong	2 Saman Yae
2 Tha Mai	2 Tha Maka	2 Tha Ruea	2 Tha Sao	2 Yang Muang
3 Don Cha-em	3 Phong Tuek	3 Saen To	4 Takhram En	5 Khao Samsip Hap
5 Nong Lan	5 Phra Thaen

The Christians have six churches and muslims have one mosque.
