= Mueang Chumphon district =

Mueang Chumphon เมืองชุมพร
- District
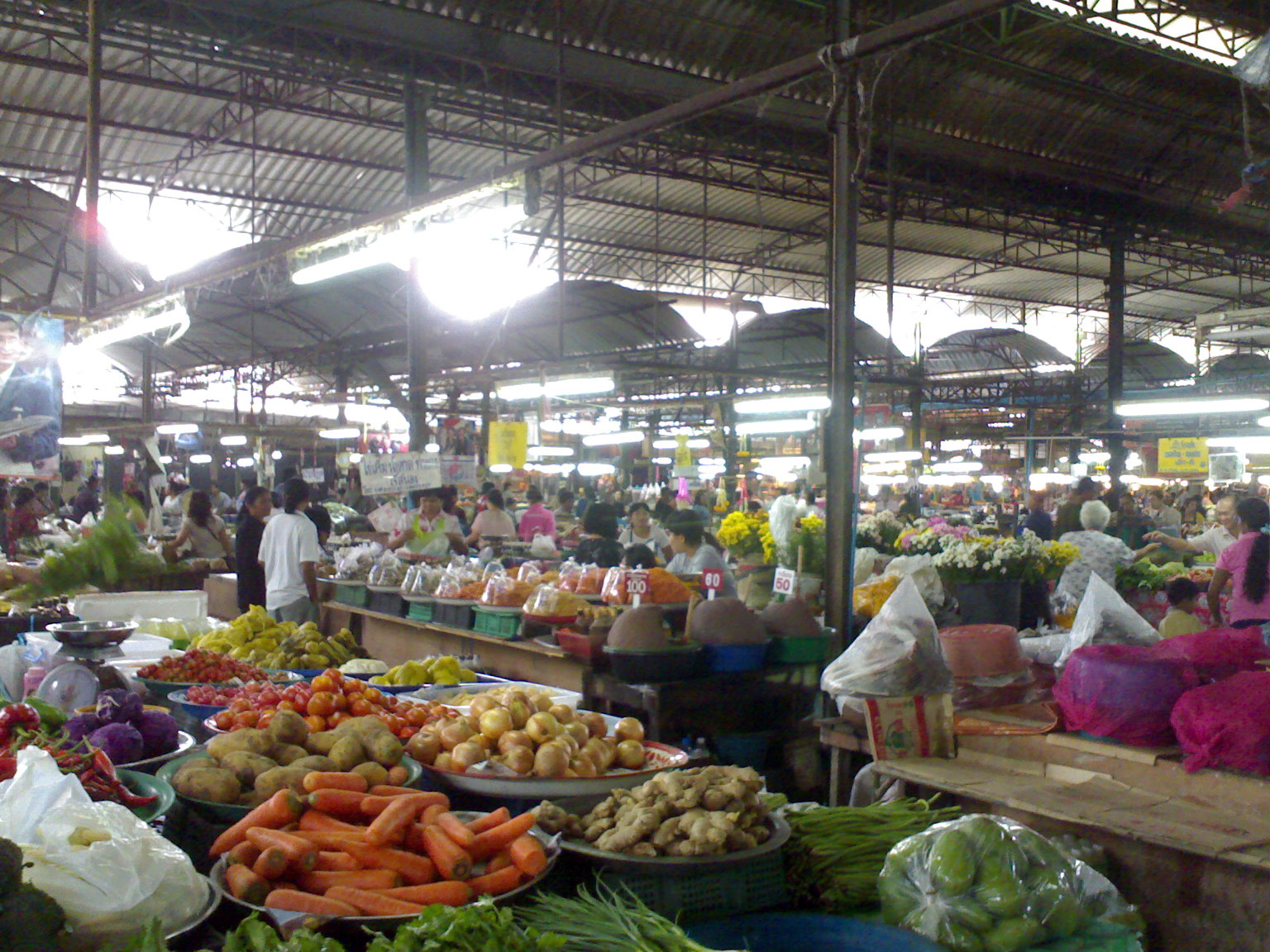
- Atmosphere of wet market in Tha Taphao

- District location in Chumphon province
- Coordinates: 10°29′35″N 99°10′49″E
- Country: Thailand
- Province: Chumphon
- Seat: Tha Taphao

Area
  - Total: 748.39 km^{2} (288.95 sq mi)

Population (9 June 1996)
  - Total: 144,682
  - Density: 213/km^{2} (550/sq mi)
- Time zone: UTC+7 (ICT)
- Postal code: 86000
- Geocode: 8601

Mueang Chumphon (Thai: เมืองชุมพร, pronounced [mɯ̄a̯ŋ t͡ɕʰūm.pʰɔ̄ːn]) is the capital district (amphoe mueang) of Chumphon province, southern Thailand.

== Geography ==
Neighboring districts are (from the south clockwise) Sawi of Chumphon Province, Kra Buri of Ranong province, Tha Sae and Pathio of Chumphon Province.

== History ==
On 29 April 1917 the district's name was changed from Mueang to Tha Tapao (ท่าตะเภา). On 14 November 1938 it was renamed Mueang Chumphon.

== Administration ==
The district is divided into 17 sub-districts (tambons), which are further subdivided into 165 villages (mubans). Chumphon is a town (thesaban mueang) which covers the whole tambon Tha Taphao and parts of tambon Bang Mak, Na Thung, Tak Daet, Khun Krathing, and Wang Phai. There are a further three townships (thesaban tambons): Paknam Chumphon covers parts of tambon Paknam, Tha Yang the whole tambon Tha Yang, and Wang Phai parts of tambon Wang Phai. There are a further 16 tambon administrative organization.

No.	Name	Thai name	Villages	Pop.
1.	Tha Taphao	ท่าตะเภา	-	12,622
2.	Pak Nam	ปากน้ำ	10	13,245
3.	Tha Yang	ท่ายาง	11	10,148
4.	Bang Mak	บางหมาก	13	12,188
5.	Na Thung	นาทุ่ง	10	10,803
6.	Na Cha-ang	นาชะอัง	9	6,189
7.	Tak Daet	ตากแดด	9	10,808
8.	Bang Luek	บางลึก	12	7,718
9.	Hat Phan Krai	หาดพันไกร	12	5,243
10.	Wang Phai	วังไผ่	13	11,132
11.	Wang Mai	วังใหม่	9	9,188
12.	Ban Na	บ้านนา	13	8,254
13.	Khun Krathing	ขุนกระทิง	8	3,976
14.	Thung Kha	ทุ่งคา	11	7,066
15.	Wisai Nuea	วิสัยเหนือ	12	6,260
16.	Hat Sai Ri	หาดทรายรี	7	3,893
17.	Tham Sing	ถ้ำสิงห์	6	3,032

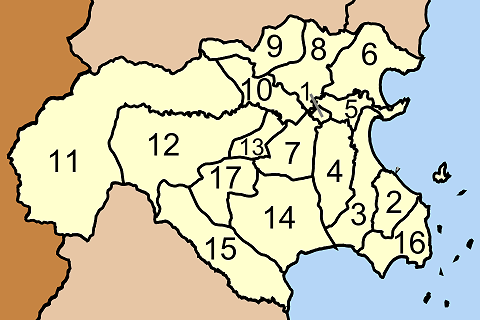
