= Chan Sen =

Chan Sen จันเสน
- Tambon
- Interactive map of Chan Sen
- Coordinates: 15°07′23.6″N 100°27′29.0″E
- Country: Thailand
- Province: Nakhon Sawan
- District: Takhli

Government
  - Type: Subdistrict Administrative Organization (SAO)
  - Mayor: Nonrasit Samakkan

Area
  - Total: 64.178 km^{2} (24.779 sq mi)

Population
  - Total: 6,259
  - Density: 97.53/km^{2} (252.6/sq mi)
- Time zone: UTC+7 (ICT)
- Postcode: 60260
- Area code: (+66) 02
- Website: https://www.chansen.go.th/frontpage

Chan Sen, also written as Chansen (Thai: จันเสน, pronounced [t͡ɕān.sěːn]) is a tambon (subdistrict) in Takhli District, Nakhon Sawan Province, upper central Thailand.

== History ==
Chan Sen's history dates back more than 2,000–3,000 years and is considered an ancient town in the late Iron Age and continued until the early Dvaravati period, contemporary with Funan in present-day Vietnam and Suphan Buri's U Thong. This is confirmed by the discovery of human skeletons, fragments of pottery, stone axes and iron tools on Khao Chong Khae Hill in the area and at Ban Mai Chaimongkol Village in its district as well as the neighbouring areas.

The condition of the ancient town of Chan Sen was first discovered from aerial photographs in 1966 by Thai architect and national artist Nij Hincheerana.

In addition, Chan Sen used to be an important trading route in the Lop Buri–Pasak basin.

== Geography ==
It is a southern part of the district, about 28 km (17.4 mi) from downtown Takhli. The topography can be divided into two main parts: non-irrigated area, an upland; and irrigated area which is a lowland.

The area is bounded by other subdistricts (from the north clockwise): Huai Hom in its district, Lat Thippharot in its district and Sai Huai Kaeo with Phai Yai in Ban Mi District of Lop Buri Province, Thong En in In Buri District of Sing Buri Province, Soi Thong, Phrom Nimit, and Chong Khae in its district, respectively.

Chan Sen has a total area of 35,634 rai or approximately 64.178 km^{2}.

== Administration ==
=== Central administration ===
The entire area is governed by the Subdistrict Administrative Organization Chan Sen (SAO Chan Sen).

=== Local administration ===
It was also divided into 10 muban (village)

No.	Name	Thai
1.	Ban Lat Thippharot	บ้านลาดทิพรส
2.	Ban Khok Chan Sen	บ้านโคกจันเสน
3.	Ban Dong Man	บ้านดงมัน
4.	Ban Nong Tham Wua	บ้านหนองถ้ำวัว
5.	Ban Nong Tako	บ้านหนองตะโก
6.	Ban Nong Ta Mi	บ้านหนองตามี
7.	Ban Sa Kae-ngo (Nong Krajao)	บ้านสะแกโง๊ะ (หนองกระเจา)
8.	Ban Chan Sen	บ้านจันเสน
9.	Ban Nong Mai Daeng	บ้านหนองไม้แดง
10.	Ban Nong Krathum	บ้านหนองกระทุ่ม

== Population ==
Chan Sen has a total population of 6,259 in 1,627 households.

== Places ==
- Wat Chan Sen
- Chan Sen Museum
- Chan Sen Ancient Town
- Chansen railway station
