= Khao Kala =

Khao Kala เขากะลา
- Tambon
- Khao Kala
- Etymology: "coconut shell mountain"
- Interactive map of Khao Kala
- Coordinates: 15°34′0″N 100°17′0″E
- Country: Thailand
- Province: Nakhon Sawan
- District: Phayuha Khiri
- Named for: Kala mountains

Government
  - Type: Subdistrict Administrative Organization (SAO)
  - Mayor: Prachuap Meethong
  - Vice mayor: FS1 Samran Khlaisaeng

Area
  - Total: 217.23 km^{2} (83.87 sq mi)

Population
  - Total: 8,458
- Time zone: UTC+7 (ICT)
- Postcode: 60130
- Area code: (+66) 02

Khao Kala (Thai: เขากะลา, pronounced [kʰǎw kā.lāː]) is a tambon (sub-district) and neighbourhood in Nakhon Sawan Province, upper central Thailand.

== Geography ==
Khao Kala is a line of low mountains shaped like an inverted coconut shell. This unique form gave rise to its name, "Khao Kala", which means "coconut shell hill". The range extends from Tambon Khao Kala in Phayuha Khiri District to Tambon Phra Non in Mueang Nakhon Sawan District, the provincial capital. From the top of Khao Kala, visitors can enjoy a panoramic view stretching far into the horizon, including the vast Bung Boraphet, Thailand's largest freshwater lake.

Most of the area is plateau and mountainous. Khao Kala is located about 24 km (14.9 mi) east of downtown Phayuha Khiri.

Khao Kala has a total area of 217.23 square kilometers (about 135,768.75 rais).

Adjoining areas are (from north clockwise): Phra Non in Mueang Nakhon Sawan District, Hua Thanon in Tha Tako District, Nikhom Khao Bo Kaeo in its district, Udom Thanya in Tak Fa District, and Khao Thong with Nikhom Khao Bo Kaeo in its district, respectively.

== Demography ==
Total population of 8,458 people (4,114 men, and 4,344 women) in 2,999 households.

== Economy ==
Most of the population has a career in sugarcane farming. The occupation of the rice farmers is a minority.

== Administration ==
Khao Kala is governed by the Subdistrict Administrative Organization (SAO) Khao Kala (เทศบาลตำบลเขากะลา).

The tambon is divided into 19 administrative mubans (village)

No.	Name	Thai
1.	Ban Huai Bong	บ้านห้วยบง
2.	Ban Khao Sam Yot	บ้านเขาสามยอด
3.	Ban Phu Wa	บ้านพุหว้า
4.	Ban Nong Tao	บ้านหนองเต่า
5.	Ban Than Lamyai	บ้านธารลำไย
6.	Ban Nong Khloi	บ้านหนองกลอย
7.	Ban Sab Pakkard	บ้านซับผักกาด
8.	Ban Sa Bua	บ้านสระบัว
9.	Ban Sa Bua Tai	บ้านสระบัวใต้
10.	Ban Phu Wiset	บ้านพุวิเศษ
11.	Ban Hua Khao Phra Krai	บ้านหัวเขาพระไกร
12.	Ban Khao Sanam Chai	บ้านเขาสนามชัย
13.	Ban Phu Ta Mueang	บ้านพุตาเมือง
14.	Ban Khao Khat	บ้านเขาขาด
15.	Ban Dong Man	บ้านดงมัน
16.	Ban Hang Nam	บ้านหางน้ำ
17.	Ban Khao Wong Nuea	บ้านเขาวงค์เหนือ
18.	Ban Khao Wong Klang	บ้านเขาวงค์กลาง
19.	Ban Mai Tha Nam Oi	บ้านใหม่ท่าน้ำอ้อย

== Utilities ==
Khao Kala has four local hospitals, 19 local health centres, four drugstores.

There are a total of nine temples and two abbeys.

In education, Khao Kala consists of five child development centres, six primary schools, one secondary school, six public libraries, and one non-formal education centre.

In communication, there are two post offices, 16 public telephone booths.

Every household has electricity and water supply.

== UFO hotspot ==
Khao Kala is best known as Thailand's only UFO hotspot. Some locals believe it is a place where UFOs frequently appear or may even land, although others, including many locals and outsiders, remain skeptical. Nevertheless, Khao Kala has earned the nickname "Thailand's Area 51".
