= Dong Maku railway station =

Railway station in Thailand

Coordinates: 15.3053°N 100.3313°E

Dong Maku ดงมะกุ
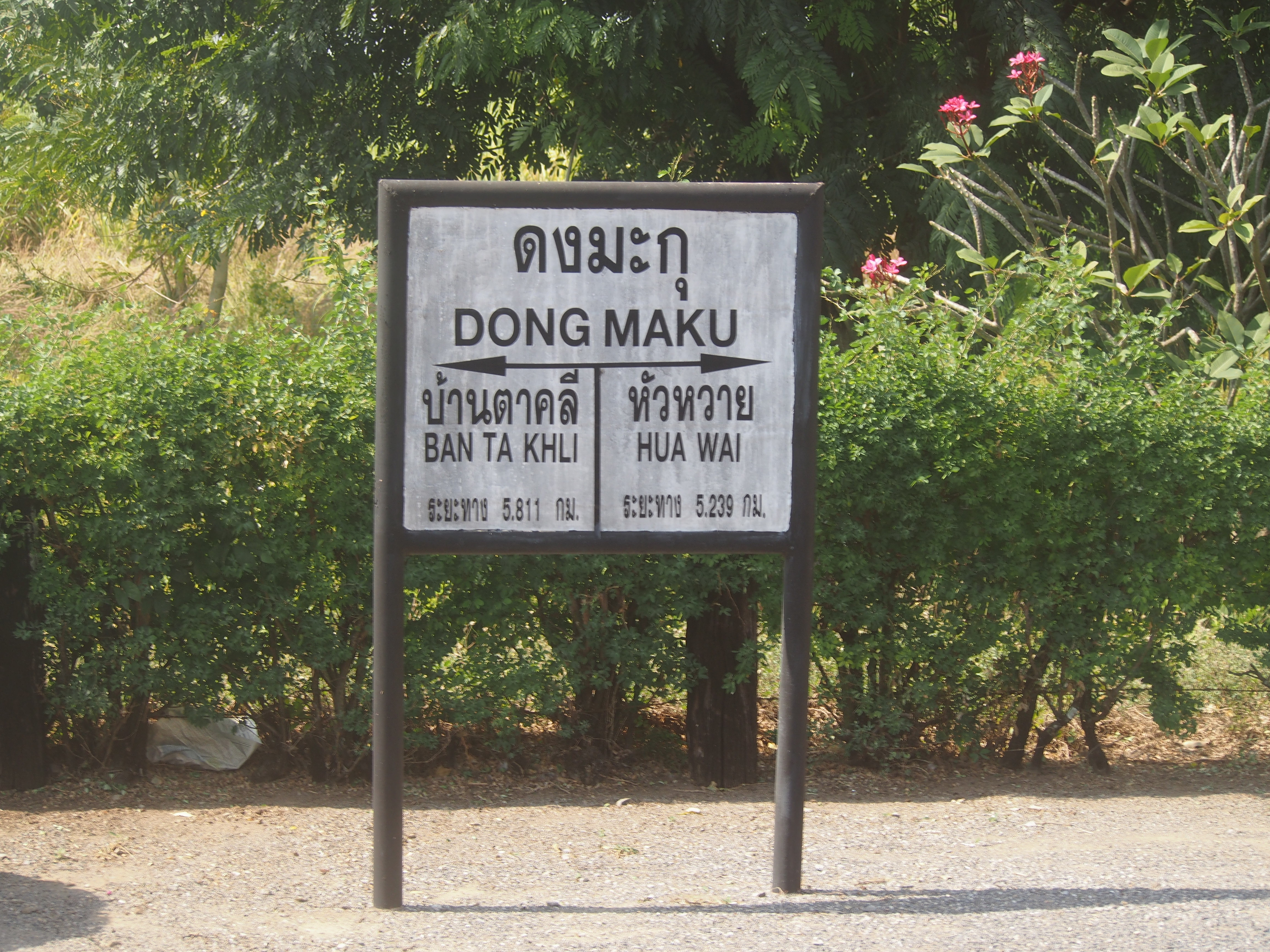
- Signage

General information
- Location: Mu 18 (Ban Maku), Takhli Subdistrict, Takhli District, Nakhon Sawan
- Owner: State Railway of Thailand
- Line: Northern Line
- Platforms: 1
- Tracks: 2

Other information
- Station code: ดง.

Services
Preceding station	State Railway of Thailand	Following station
Ban Takhli towards Hua Lamphong or Krung Thep Aphiwat	Northern Line	Hua Wai towards Chiang Mai
Location

Dong Maku station (Thai: สถานีดงมะกุ) is a railway station located in Takhli Subdistrict, Takhli District, Nakhon Sawan. It is located 198.800 km from Bangkok railway station and is a class 3 railway station. It is on the Northern Line of the State Railway of Thailand.
