= Wat Woranat Banphot =

Buddhist Temple in Nakhon Sawan, Thailand

- Wat Khao Kob
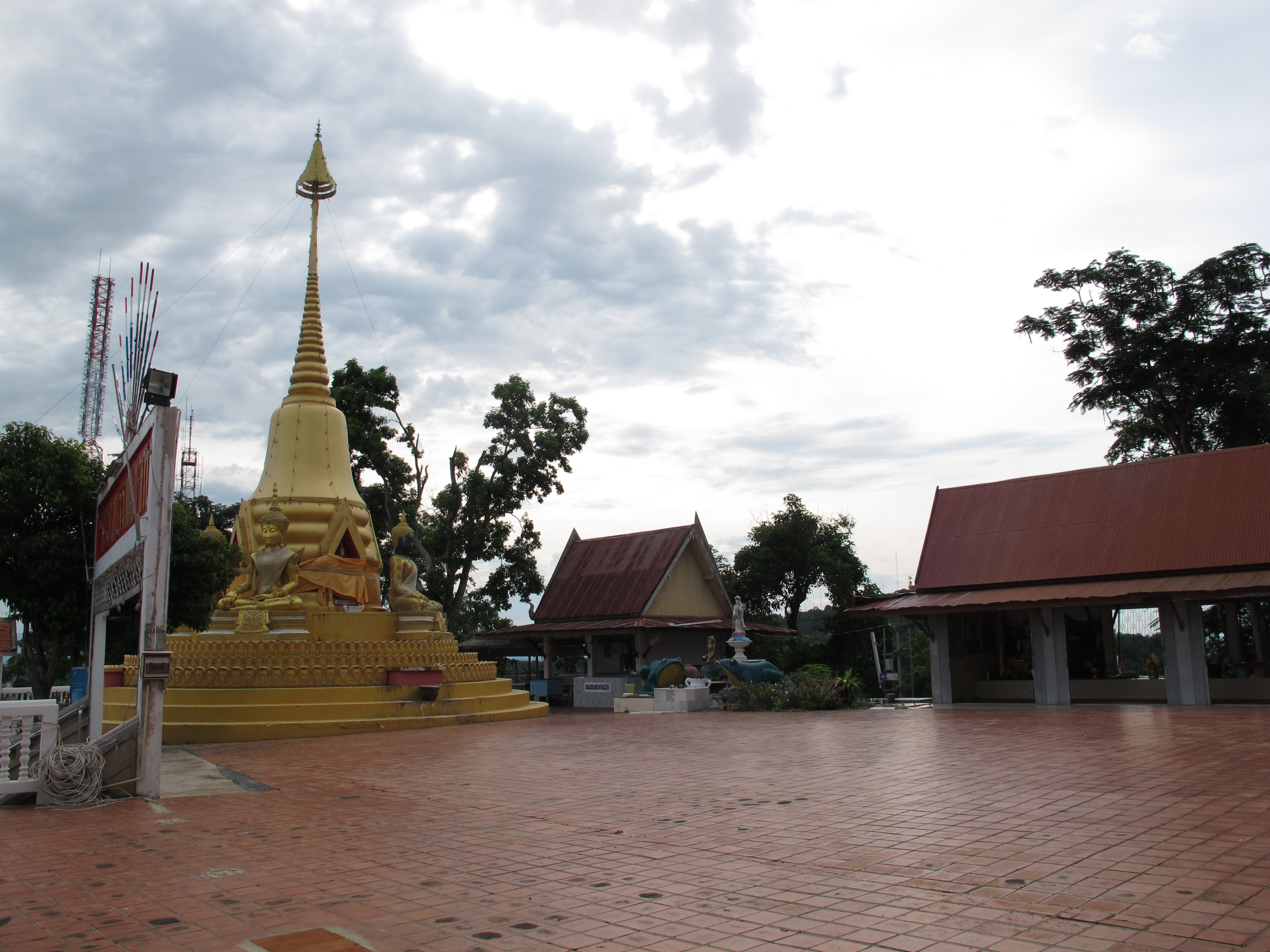
- Wat Woranat Banphot in September 2016

- Location within Thailand

Religion
- Affiliation: Buddhism
- Status: Royal monastery

Location
- Location: 188 Thammawithi Road, Pak Nam Pho, Mueang Nakhon Sawan, Nakhon Sawan Province
- Country: Thailand
- Interactive map of Wat Woranat Banphot
- Coordinates: 15.7153°N 100.1337°E

Architecture
- Founder: Lord Ban Mueang

Wat Woranat Banphot (Thai: วัดวรนาถบรรพต) also colloquially known as Wat Khao Kob (วัดเขากบ) is an ancient Buddhist temple in Mahā Nikāya sect, regarded as one of the famous and well-known temples of Nakhon Sawan Province.

== Description ==
It is an old temple on the peak of Khao Kob hill 185.5 m (608.6 ft) above mean sea level in the centre of Nakhon Sawan, a capital of the province. Khao Kob (frog mountain), the location of the temple, is regarded as the highest mountain in Nakhon Sawan. Hence the name "Wat Khao Kob".

This temple was built since the Sukhothai period by Lord Ban Mueang to dedicate to his younger brother, Lord Ram, who died in war. At that time it was called "Wat Pak Phra Bang" (วัดปากพระบาง).

The temple has a replica of Lord Buddha footprint and a pagoda encasing the relic of Lord Buddha built since the Sukhothai period. It was praised by the Department of Religious Affairs as the best development temple of 1966.

One of the former abbots of the temple, Luang Phor Thong (หลวงพ่อทอง), a monk who was highly respected by both Nakhon Sawan residents and the general public. Originally, he was a monk traveling from distant Thung Yang, Uttaradit Province, he comes to live at the peak of the desolated Khao Kob annually. With his practice, he was widely revered. Therefore, he was invited to be the abbot of Wat Khao Kob.

He has developed the temple for more than 10 years until it has the condition it is today. In addition, he was also known for being a monk with miraculous powers. Rumour has it that he was able to miraculously disappear. Luang Phor Thong was an abbot for 45 years, and died in 1941 when he was about 80 years old. Until today, his sacred objects are still popular and discussed in the circle of Thai amulet collectors.

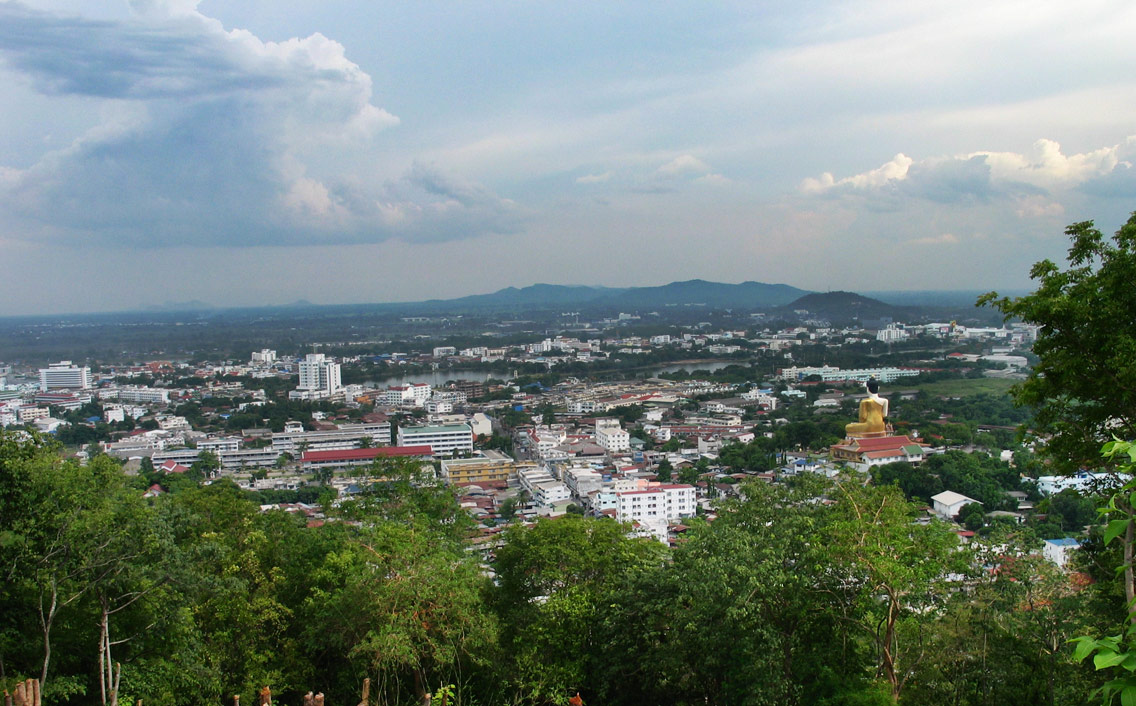
View of city of Nakhon Sawan seen from the temple

== Tourism ==
Khao Kob is regarded as a viewpoint of Nakhon Sawan City, from this point, tourists can clearly see the whole city of Nakhon Sawan, including Bueng Boraphet, a largest freshwater lake in Thailand or several mountains in adjacent district Phayuha Khiri.

There are two ways up; a stairway of 439 steps (more than Golden Mount in Bangkok 95 steps) and an asphalt road 3 m (9.8 ft) wide. Wat Woranat Banphot in the Wan Ok Phansa (Buddhist Lent Festival), is a venue where Tak Bat Thewo, a great merit-making tradition is held. The procession of monks will descend from the hill to receive alms of Buddhists as if descending from heaven.

Wat Kob covers an area of over 46 acres, mostly mountainous. Most of the monastery's income has come from its on-premises crematorium.
