= Hua Wai railway station =

Railway station in Thailand

Coordinates: 15.3488°N 100.3130°E

Hua Wai หัวหวาย

General information
- Location: Mu 1 (Ban Hua Wai), Hua Wai Subdistrict, Takhli District, Nakhon Sawan
- Owner: State Railway of Thailand
- Line: Northern Line
- Platforms: 1
- Tracks: 3

Other information
- Station code: หว.

History
- Opened: 31 October 1905; 120 years ago

Services
Preceding station	State Railway of Thailand	Following station
Dong Maku towards Hua Lamphong or Krung Thep Aphiwat	Northern Line	Nong Pho towards Chiang Mai
Location

Hua Wai railway station is a railway station located in Hua Wai Subdistrict, Takhli District, Nakhon Sawan. It is located 204.062 km from Bangkok railway station and is a class 3 railway station. It is on the Northern Line of the State Railway of Thailand. The station opened on 31 October 1905 as part of the Northern Line extension from Lop Buri to Pak Nam Pho.
