= Festival of Floral Offerings =

Thai Buddhist festival in Saraburi

- Status: Active
- Genre: Buddhist festival
- Frequency: Yearly
- Locations: Saraburi, Thailand

The Festival of Floral Offerings, or Tak Bat Dokmai, is a traditional merit making ceremony where takes place at Wat Phra Phuttabat in Saraburi province.

== Overview ==
At the beginning of Buddhist Lent in July, people gather together at Wat Phra Phuttabat to offer food to the monks. After that, they go out to collect the flower, Dok Khao-Phansa, to offer to the monks in the afternoon respectively. Dok Khao-Phansa is a special kind of flower that only found in the Saraburi province in Central Thailand. The colors of this flower are either white or purple. It blooms during the Buddhist Lent festival which is the reason why it is called Buddhist Lent Flower.

== Legend ==
In Buddha’s lifetime, Sumonmala had a duty to collect eight flowers of jasmine for offering to the king of Ratchakuek kingdom, Phra Chao Pimpisarn.

One day, Sumonmalal encountered the Lord Buddha and his monastic disciples when he was picking flowers for Phra Chao Pimpisarn. Being faithful, he offered the flowers to the Lord Buddha instead of Phra Chao Pimpisarn. However, known the reason, Phra Chao Pimpisarn did not get angry with him. Moreover, he gave the price to Sumonmala which helped him to have a better living afterwards.

== History ==
A long time ago, Dok Khao-Phansa was elegant. It had so many because of the abundance of the forest, the proper amount of rainfall. In addition, no one deforested. As a result, the people could bring them to offer the monk frequently. They went to the forest to collect the flowers together. Then, they packed these flowers with the joss sticks and candles. This activity brought them to be harmonized to each other closely. Nowadays, this ceremony was restored in 1987 which was the year of changing and removing Thai’s recitation. People took interest in it increasingly.

In this ceremony, it is performed in the afternoon of Buddhist Lent Day. People stand in the two long lines with a two-meter space between them. Then, the monks walk in that space to receive the flowers from the people. Afterwards, the monks ascend to the mondop of Wat Phra Phutthabat to the north letting the people to pour water onto their feet to wash away the sins of the people according to their belief. On the occasion, there are folk dances, folk music and exhibitions of the art. There is also a parade of the Lent Candle with long drums moving along the streets to the temple.

== See also ==
- Asalha Puja
- Kathina
- Pavarana
- Vassa
- Wan Ok Phansa
- Chak Phra
- Tak Bat Devo
- Ubon Ratchathani Candle Festival
- List of festivals in Thailand
