= Phon Thong railway station =

Railway station in Thailand

Coordinates: 15.2205°N 100.3666°E

Phon Thong โพนทอง

General information
- Location: Talat Phon Thong Community, Takhli Subdistrict, Takhli District, Nakhon Sawan
- Owner: State Railway of Thailand
- Line: Northern Line
- Platforms: 1
- Tracks: 4

Other information
- Station code: โพ.

History
- Opened: 31 October 1905; 120 years ago

Services
Preceding station	State Railway of Thailand	Following station
Thale Wa Halt towards Hua Lamphong or Krung Thep Aphiwat	Northern Line	Ban Takhli towards Chiang Mai
Location

Phon Thong railway station is a railway station located in Takhli Subdistrict, Takhli District, Nakhon Sawan, Thailand. It is located 188.650 km from Bangkok railway station and is a class 2 railway station. It is on the Northern Line of the State Railway of Thailand. Some freight services operate from this station as it is located adjacent to the Chonlaprathan Cement Factory.
