= Pang Sila Thong district =

Pang Sila Thong ปางศิลาทอง
- District
- District location in Kamphaeng Phet province
- Coordinates: 16°5′48″N 99°29′24″E
- Country: Thailand
- Province: Kamphaeng Phet
- Seat: Pho Thong

Area
  - Total: 480.5 km^{2} (185.5 sq mi)

Population (2005)
  - Total: 30,591
  - Density: 63.7/km^{2} (165/sq mi)
- Time zone: UTC+7 (ICT)
- Postal code: 62120
- Geocode: 6209

Pang Sila Thong (Thai: ปางศิลาทอง, pronounced [pāːŋ sì.lāː tʰɔ̄ːŋ]) is the southwesternmost district (amphoe) of Kamphaeng Phet province, central Thailand.

== History ==
The government split tambons Pang Ta Wai, Hin Dat, and Pho Thong from Khlong Khlung district and created the minor district (king amphoe) Pang Sila Thong on 31 May 1993. It was upgraded to a full district on 11 October 1997.

The name Pang Sila Thong stands for the three tambons comprising the district: Pang for Pang Ta Wai, Sila for Hin Dat and Thong for Pho Thong.

== Geography ==
Neighboring districts are (from the north clockwise): Khlong Lan, Khlong Khlung, Khanu Woralaksaburi of Kamphaeng Phet Province; Mae Wong of Nakhon Sawan province and Umphang of Tak province.

== Administration ==
The district is divided into three subdistricts (tambons), which are further subdivided into 42 villages (mubans). There are no municipal (thesaban) areas. There are three tambon administrative organizations (TAO).

No.	Name	Thai name	Villages	Pop.
1.	Pho Thong	โพธิ์ทอง	17	11,729
2.	Hin Dat	หินดาต	14	10,665
3.	Pang Ta Wai	ปางตาไว	11	8,197
