= Khanu Woralaksaburi district =

Khanu Woralaksaburi ขาณุวรลักษบุรี
- District
- District location in Kamphaeng Phet province
- Coordinates: 16°3′41″N 99°51′38″E
- Country: Thailand
- Province: Kamphaeng Phet
- Seat: Saen To
- Subdistrict: 11
- Muban: 143

Area
  - Total: 1,143.1 km^{2} (441.4 sq mi)

Population (2014)
  - Total: 106,564
  - Density: 94.2/km^{2} (244/sq mi)
- Time zone: UTC+7 (ICT)
- Postal code: 62180
- Geocode: 6204

WannaJaiseangKhanu Woralaksaburi (Thai: ขาณุวรลักษบุรี, pronounced [kʰǎː.núʔ wɔ̄ː.rā.lák.sà.bū.rīː]) is a district (amphoe) in the southern part of Kamphaeng Phet province, central Thailand.

== History ==
In 1987 history students from Silpakorn University surveyed the Khanu Woralaksaburi District. They found stone axes, clay pots, and beads of the Khao Kalon community. They estimated the age of the community to be around 5,000-1,000 years before historic era.

Tambon Saen To, Salok Bat, Bo Tham, Yang Sung and Rahan were separated from Khlong Khlung district and created to form a minor district (king amphoe) named Khanu, which was renamed Saen To in 1917. The minor district was renamed Khanu Woralaksaburi in 1939. It was upgraded to a full district in 1948.

== Geography ==
Neighboring districts are (from the west clockwise): Pang Sila Thong, Khlong Khlung, Bueng Samakkhi of Kamphaeng Phet Province; Banphot Phisai, Lat Yao, and Mae Wong of Nakhon Sawan province.

== Administration ==
=== Central administration ===
Khanu Woralaksaburi is divided into 11 subdistricts (tambons), which are further subdivided into 143 administrative villages (mubans).

No.	Name	Thai	Villages	Pop.
3.	Yang Sung	ยางสูง	9	7,522
4.	Pa Phutsa	ป่าพุทรา	16	9,869
5.	Saen To	แสนตอ	7	9,330
6.	Salokbat	สลกบาตร	7	11,994
7.	Bo Tham	บ่อถ้ำ	18	13,118
8.	Don Taeng	ดอนแตง	9	4,894
9.	Wang Chaphlu	วังชะพลู	20	13,872
10.	Khong Phai	โค้งไผ่	13	6,461
11.	Pang Makha	ปางมะค่า	24	17,441
12.	Wang Hamhae	วังหามแห	12	7,794
13.	Ko Tan	เกาะตาล	8	4,269

Missing numbers are districts which now form Bueng Samakkhi District.

=== Local administration ===
There is one town (thesaban mueang) in the district:

- Pang Makha (Thai: เทศบาลเมืองปางมะค่า) consisting of subdistrict Pang Makha.

There are two subdistrict municipalities (thesaban tambons) in the district:

- Khanu Woralaksaburi (Thai: เทศบาลตำบลขาณุวรลักษบุรี) consisting of parts of subdistricts Yang Sung, Pa Phutsa, and Saen To.
- Salokbat (Thai: เทศบาลตำบลสลกบาตร) consisting of parts of subdistrict Salokbat.

There are 10 subdistrict administrative organizations (SAO) in the district:

- Yang Sung (Thai: องค์การบริหารส่วนตำบลยางสูง) consisting of parts of subdistrict Yang Sung.
- Pa Phutsa (Thai: องค์การบริหารส่วนตำบลป่าพุทรา) consisting of parts of subdistrict Pa Phutsa.
- Saen To (Thai: องค์การบริหารส่วนตำบลแสนตอ) consisting of parts of subdistrict Saen To.
- Salokbat (Thai: องค์การบริหารส่วนตำบลสลกบาตร) consisting of parts of subdistrict Salokbat.
- Bo Tham (Thai: องค์การบริหารส่วนตำบลบ่อถ้ำ) consisting of subdistrict Bo Tham.
- Don Taeng (Thai: องค์การบริหารส่วนตำบลดอนแตง) consisting of subdistrict Don Taeng.
- Wang Chaphlu (Thai: องค์การบริหารส่วนตำบลวังชะพลู) consisting of subdistrict Wang Chaphlu.
- Khong Phai (Thai: องค์การบริหารส่วนตำบลโค้งไผ่) consisting of subdistrict Khong Phai.
- Wang Hamhae (Thai: องค์การบริหารส่วนตำบลวังหามแห) consisting of subdistrict Wang Hamhae.
- Ko Tan (Thai: องค์การบริหารส่วนตำบลเกาะตาล) consisting of subdistrict Ko Tan.
