= Mae Wong Dam =

- Location within Thailand
- Country: Thailand
- Location: Mae Wong, Nakhon Sawan
- Coordinates: 15°55′01.74″N 99°19′39.18″E
- Purpose: Flood control, irrigation
- Status: Proposed
- Owner: Royal Irrigation Department

Dam and spillways
- Type of dam: Embankment, earth-fill clay-core
- Impounds: Sakae Krang River
- Height: 56 m (184 ft)
- Length: 903 m (2,963 ft)
- Width (crest): 12 m (39 ft)

Reservoir
- Total capacity: 258,000,000 m^{3} (209,000 acre⋅ft)
- Surface area: 12.3 km^{2} (4.7 mi^{2})

The Mae Wong Dam (Thai: เขื่อนแม่วงก์, RTGS: Khuean Mae Wong, pronounced [kʰɯ̀a̯n mɛ̂ː wōŋ]) is a planned embankment dam on the Mae Wong River, a tributary of the Sakae Krang River, in Mae Wong District of Nakhon Sawan Province in western Thailand. The purpose of the dam is to control floods and supply water for irrigation. The dam's reservoir would be within Mae Wong National Park, which has drawn opposition.

== Background ==
On 10 April 2012, Thailand's cabinet approved in principle the 13.2 billion baht dam project in response to water shortages in the dry season and heavy floods in the wet season. Opponents of the project state that it will eliminate around 1,760 hectares (17.6 km^{2}) of low-lying forest, and reduce the habitat for animals in the national park which covers 900 km^{2}.

In July 2012, a case was filed at Central Administrative Court against Yingluck Shinawatra, the cabinet, the director-general of the Royal Irrigation Department, and the Minister of Agriculture and Cooperatives by the Stop Global Warming Association and 151 persons representing environmental groups.

On 22 September 2013, the Bangkok Post said that in Bangkok, "Thousands of supporters turned out on Sunday to welcome the environmental campaigner Sasin Chalermlap, who arrived in Bangkok after a 388 km walk to protest plans to build a dam in Mae Wong National Park". Days later the Thai government announced that they would study an alternative to the dam. During a November 2013 hearing, locals reportedly supported the projects benefits and asked the government to pursue it. On 23 September 2013 the science and technology minister stated that construction of the dam will push forward.

Prime Minister Prayut Chan-o-cha visited the area on 26 February 2016 and instructed his government to assess the pros and cons of the dam. He said that construction of the dam would be worthwhile if it could ensure water for 300,000 rai of farmland. The dam's reservoir would cover about 13,000 rai in Mae Wong National Park and would hold up to 250 million cubic metres of water. Critics say the dam would inundate 10,000-13,000 rai of forest.

In November 2016, the Central Administrative Court ruled that the cabinet resolution in favour of the dam should stand. It said that the government must complete all environmental and health impact assessment (EHIA) studies set out under the law before the dam can go ahead. According to the court, the cabinet resolution is only a procedure to seek endorsement for proceeding with construction. As a result, the cabinet resolution is legal and can stand.
