= Ko Lamphu =

Island in Tapi River, Surat Thani, Thailand

เกาะลำพู
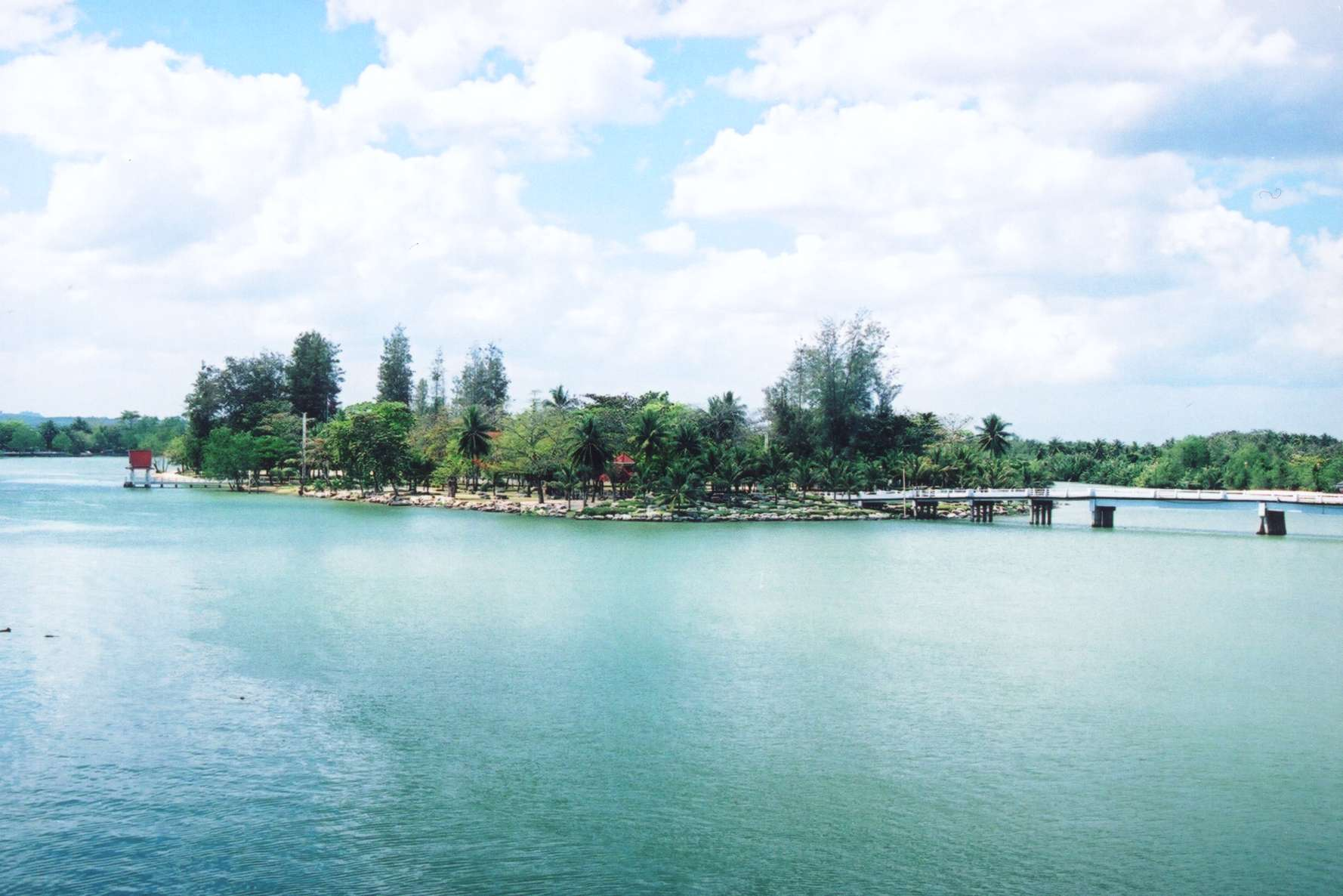

- Location within Thailand

Geography
- Location: Tapi River, Surat Thani, Thailand
- Coordinates: 09°08′14″N 99°18′56″E
- Type: River island
- Length: 0.75 km (0.466 mi)

Ko Lamphu (เกาะลำพู) is a river island on the Tapi River in Thailand. It is located near Surat Thani's city centre, about 9 km (5.6 miles) from the river's mouth. It is connected to the mainland by a bridge near the city pillar shrine.

Ko Lamphu is mostly flat and 0.75 km (0.47 mi) long. There is a small park on the island, mainly used for picnics and sports. Food stalls are often set up at various spots on the island, serving the visitors with snacks and food. Koh Lamphu offers a view of Surat Thani's skyline with its promenade by the riverfront.

== Festivals ==
The Chak Phra and the Thot Phapa Buddhist ceremonies are celebrated on the same day in October at Ko Lamphu. At the Thot Phapa event Buddha images on elaborately decorated carriages are pulled by local people during land- and water-borne processions. This ceremony takes place at dawn. Chak Phra, celebrated later in the day, consists of offering saffron robes to monks and donations to temples at the end of the Buddhist Rains Retreat.

== See also ==
- List of islands of Thailand
