= Mae Poen district =

Mae Poen แม่เปิน
- District
- District location in Nakhon Sawan province
- Coordinates: 15°39′28″N 99°28′9″E
- Country: Thailand
- Province: Nakhon Sawan
- Seat: Mae Poen

Area
  - Total: 260.2 km^{2} (100.5 sq mi)

Population (2005)
  - Total: 19,730
  - Density: 75.83/km^{2} (196.4/sq mi)
- Time zone: UTC+7 (ICT)
- Postal code: 60150
- Geocode: 6014

Mae Poen (Thai: แม่เปิน, pronounced [mɛ̂ː pɤ̄n]) is a district (amphoe) in the western part of Nakhon Sawan province, central Thailand.

== History ==
Tambon Mae Poen was separated from Lat Yao district to become a minor district (king amphoe) on 15 July 1996.

On 15 May 2007, all of Thailand's 81 minor districts were upgraded to full districts. With publication in the Royal Gazette on 24 August, the upgrade became official .

== Geography ==
Neighboring districts are (from the north clockwise): Mae Wong and Chum Ta Bong of Nakhon Sawan Province, Lan Sak and Ban Rai of Uthai Thani province, and Umphang of Tak province.

== Administration ==
The district is divided into a single sub-district (tambon), which is further subdivided into 24 villages (mubans). There are no municipal (thesaban) areas, and a single tambon administrative organization (TAO).

No.	Name	Thai name	Villages	Pop.
1.	Mae Poen	แม่เปิน	24	19,730
