= Chansen railway station =

Railway station in Thailand

Coordinates: 15.1222°N 100.4598°E

Chansen จันเสน

General information
- Location: Mu 8 (Ban Chansen), Chansen Subdistrict, Takhli District, Nakhon Sawan
- Owner: State Railway of Thailand
- Line: Northern Line
- Platforms: 1
- Tracks: 3

Other information
- Station code: จส.

History
- Opened: 31 October 1905

Services
Preceding station	State Railway of Thailand	Following station
Rong Rien Chansen Halt towards Hua Lamphong or Krung Thep Aphiwat	Northern Line	Ban Kok Kwaow Halt towards Chiang Mai
Location

Chansen station (Thai: สถานีจันเสน) is a railway station located in Chansen Subdistrict, Takhli District, Nakhon Sawan. It is located 173.864 km from Bangkok railway station and is a class 2 railway station. It is on the Northern Line of the State Railway of Thailand. The station opened on 31 October 1905 as part of the Northern Line extension from Lop Buri to Pak Nam Pho.
