= Sala Daeng Subdistrict =

Sala Daeng Subdistrict may refer to the following subdistricts (tambon) of Thailand:

- Sala Daeng Subdistrict in Bang Nam Priao District, Cha Choeng Sao Province
- Sala Daeng Subdistrict in Krok Phra District, Nakhon Sawan Province
- Sala Daeng Subdistrict in Mueang Ang Thong District
