= Umphang district =

Umphang อุ้มผาง
- District
- District location in Tak province
- Coordinates: 16°1′0″N 98°51′46″E
- Country: Thailand
- Province: Tak

Area
  - Total: 4,325.4 km^{2} (1,670.0 sq mi)

Population (2005)
  - Total: 25,757
  - Density: 6/km^{2} (16/sq mi)
- Time zone: UTC+7 (ICT)
- Postal code: 63170
- Geocode: 6308

Umphang (Thai: อุ้มผาง, pronounced [ʔûm.pʰǎːŋ]) is the southernmost district (amphoe) of Tak province, Thailand, established by the Royal Decree Establishing Amphoe Umphang, BE 2502 (1959), which came into force on 6 May 1959.

The district is on the Thai-Burmese border. It is also the name of the town center of the district. Neighboring districts are (north from clockwise): Phop Phra district; Khlong Lan district, and Pang Sila Thong district of Kamphaeng Phet province; Mae Wong district and Mae Poen district of Nakhon Sawan province; Ban Rai district of Uthai Thani province; and Thong Pha Phum district and Sangkhla Buri district of Kanchanaburi province. The western edge of the district has a long boundary with Burma. Surrounded by national parks and wildlife reserves, it is one of the least accessible districts in Thailand. Nevertheless, it has one major tourist attraction, Thi Lo Su Waterfall (น้ำตกทีลอซู), the largest waterfall in Thailand.

== History ==
Umphang was established as a district in 1898. It was named Mae Klong (อำเภอแม่กลอง) back then and was part of Uthai Thani province. In 1906 it was renamed Umphang and moved to Kamphaeng Phet province. Its status was changed to a king amphoe and moved to Tak Province effective 1 January 1926. Finally in 1959 it was promoted back to district status.

== Etymology ==
It was thought that the name Umphang came from Karen word Umpa, meaning the act of opening a bamboo container. This was performed by Burmese to show passports stored in the bamboo to Thai immigration officers.

== Geography ==
Most of Umphang is mountainous, geographically separated from the east part of Tak Province by the Thanon Thongchai Range (ทิวเขาถนนธงชัย). In the southern part of Umphang are the Dawna Hills and the Thungyai Naresuan Wildlife Sanctuary while in the central part near Umphang town there is the Umphang Wildlife Sanctuary. Directly east of Umphang Wildlife Sanctuary is Mae Wong National Park (in Tak and Kamphaeng Phet Province) and Khlong Lan National Park (in Kamphaeng Phet Province). The area, due to its difficulty of access, was used as a base by the Communist Party of Thailand.

An important river in Umphang is Mae Klong River (แม่น้ำแม่กลอง) which originates here and flows south into Kanchanaburi province.

== Climate ==
Climate data for Umphang (1991–2020, extremes 1977-present)
Month	Jan	Feb	Mar	Apr	May	Jun	Jul	Aug	Sep	Oct	Nov	Dec	Year
Record high °C (°F)	35.2 (95.4)	37.0 (98.6)	39.7 (103.5)	41.0 (105.8)	40.0 (104.0)	35.2 (95.4)	34.8 (94.6)	34.2 (93.6)	34.8 (94.6)	34.7 (94.5)	35.0 (95.0)	33.7 (92.7)	41.0 (105.8)
Mean daily maximum °C (°F)	30.6 (87.1)	32.8 (91.0)	34.6 (94.3)	34.9 (94.8)	32.4 (90.3)	30.2 (86.4)	29.1 (84.4)	28.8 (83.8)	29.8 (85.6)	30.4 (86.7)	30.2 (86.4)	29.4 (84.9)	31.1 (88.0)
Daily mean °C (°F)	20.5 (68.9)	22.0 (71.6)	24.6 (76.3)	26.2 (79.2)	26.0 (78.8)	25.3 (77.5)	24.7 (76.5)	24.4 (75.9)	24.7 (76.5)	24.2 (75.6)	22.5 (72.5)	20.4 (68.7)	23.8 (74.8)
Mean daily minimum °C (°F)	12.9 (55.2)	13.3 (55.9)	16.4 (61.5)	19.6 (67.3)	21.5 (70.7)	21.9 (71.4)	21.6 (70.9)	21.7 (71.1)	21.5 (70.7)	20.1 (68.2)	17.0 (62.6)	13.9 (57.0)	18.5 (65.2)
Record low °C (°F)	4.3 (39.7)	2.3 (36.1)	6.5 (43.7)	11.8 (53.2)	13.6 (56.5)	18.2 (64.8)	17.6 (63.7)	18.2 (64.8)	15.4 (59.7)	11.2 (52.2)	6.0 (42.8)	0.8 (33.4)	0.8 (33.4)
Average precipitation mm (inches)	8.9 (0.35)	10.2 (0.40)	55.9 (2.20)	98.9 (3.89)	180.8 (7.12)	188.0 (7.40)	245.1 (9.65)	260.9 (10.27)	258.0 (10.16)	145.1 (5.71)	26.0 (1.02)	8.1 (0.32)	1,485.9 (58.50)
Average precipitation days (≥ 1.0 mm)	1.1	1.2	4.4	7.6	15.2	19.8	23.8	24.9	21.1	12.4	2.5	0.8	134.8
Average relative humidity (%)	74.1	68.1	65.9	70.9	79.4	83.6	86.0	87.1	86.2	83.5	80.1	77.7	78.6
Mean monthly sunshine hours	275.9	259.9	275.9	243.0	158.1	57.0	58.9	58.9	54.0	142.6	252.0	275.9	2,112.1
Mean daily sunshine hours	8.9	9.2	8.9	8.1	5.1	1.9	1.9	1.9	1.8	4.6	8.4	8.9	5.8
Source 1: World Meteorological Organization
Source 2: Office of Water Management and Hydrology, Royal Irrigation Department (sun 1981–2010)(extremes)

== Demographics ==
A large number of the 28,000 population are hill tribes with Karen people making up the largest proportion. Karen were the original settlers here before Thais began to migrate into the area, and many place names are in the Karen language.

== Transportation ==
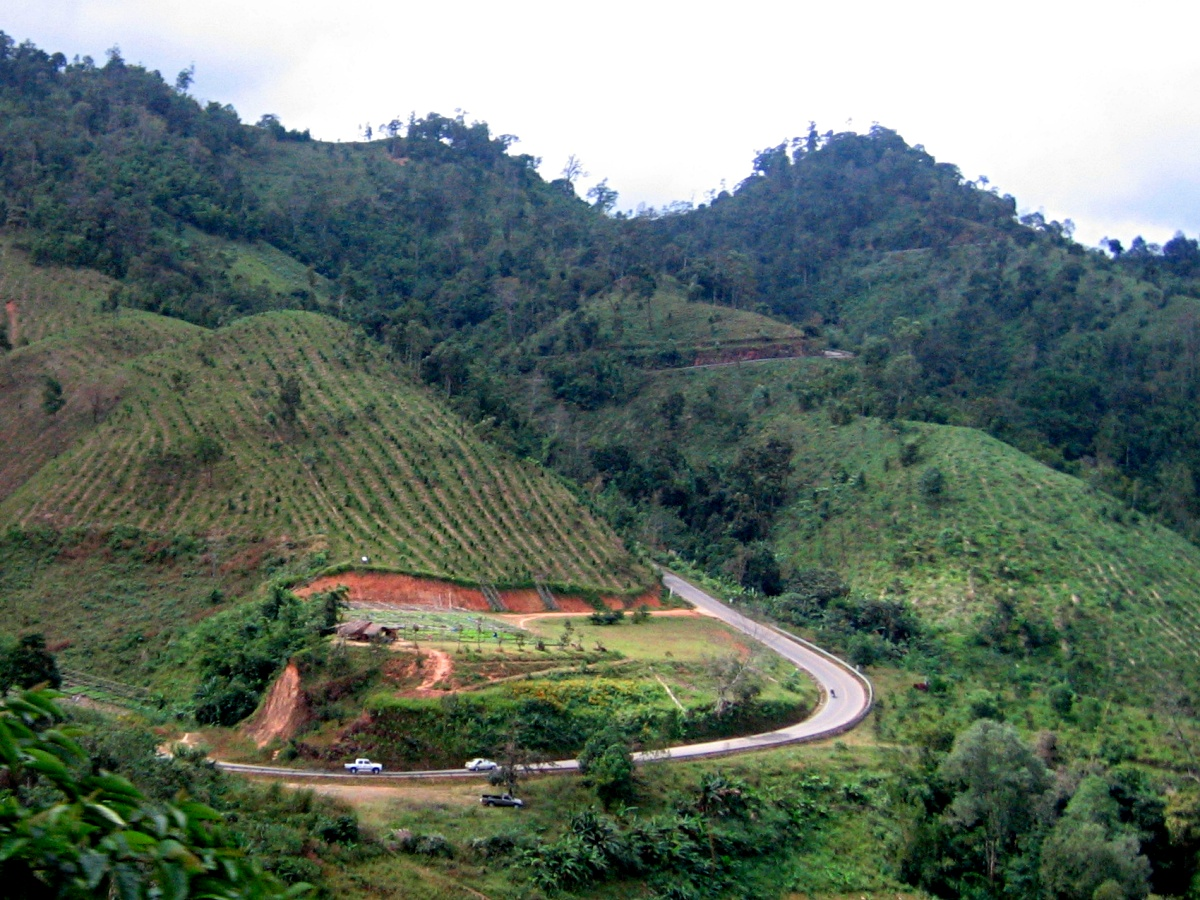
Curvy section of Highway 1090

Highway 1090 (Mae Sot-Umphang) is the only road linking Umphang to other parts of Thailand. Another highway, Highway 1167, connects Umphang town to the Burmese border. Highway 1090, 164 km in total, has two lanes during much of the way and contains 1,219 curves, a number proudly displayed at numerous places in Umphang. It is one of the more unpleasant roads for those who suffer from motion sickness. The journey from Mae Sot takes from three to four hours. The journey from Bangkok takes about 12 hours.

In the late-1970s, construction started on Highway 1117, (Khlong Lan-Umphang) a project that would have provided a connection from Amphoe Khlong Lan, Kamphaeng Phet province. It was part of a military effort to combat communist insurgency in the region. The project was shelved in 1987 pending an environmental study. About 115 km of the highway beginning in Khlong Lan was constructed, leaving the last 28 km on the Umphang side where it stopped at Umphang Wildlife Sanctuary in 1990. Efforts to finish this project surfaced a few times, but was eventually rejected due to the virgin forest in the path of the road. Another project linking Umphang to Amphoe Sangkhla Buri, Kanchanaburi Province was proposed in 2004, but was immediately rejected. Highway 1117 would have shortened the journey from Bangkok by five hours, and by-passed Mae Sot entirely.

There is a municipal airport in Umphang. Scheduled flights here were scrapped due to low demand.

== Places ==
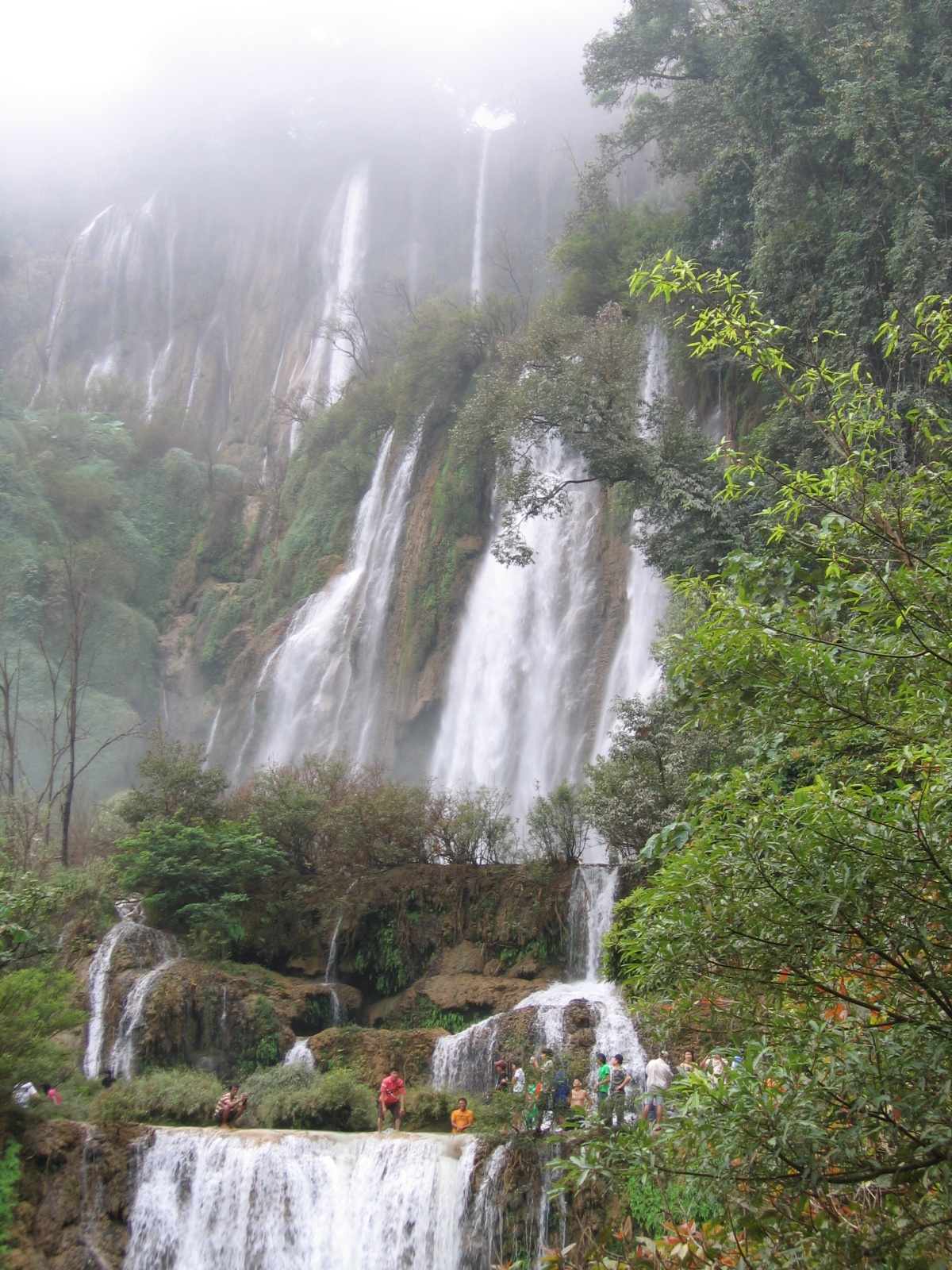
Thi Lo Su Waterfall

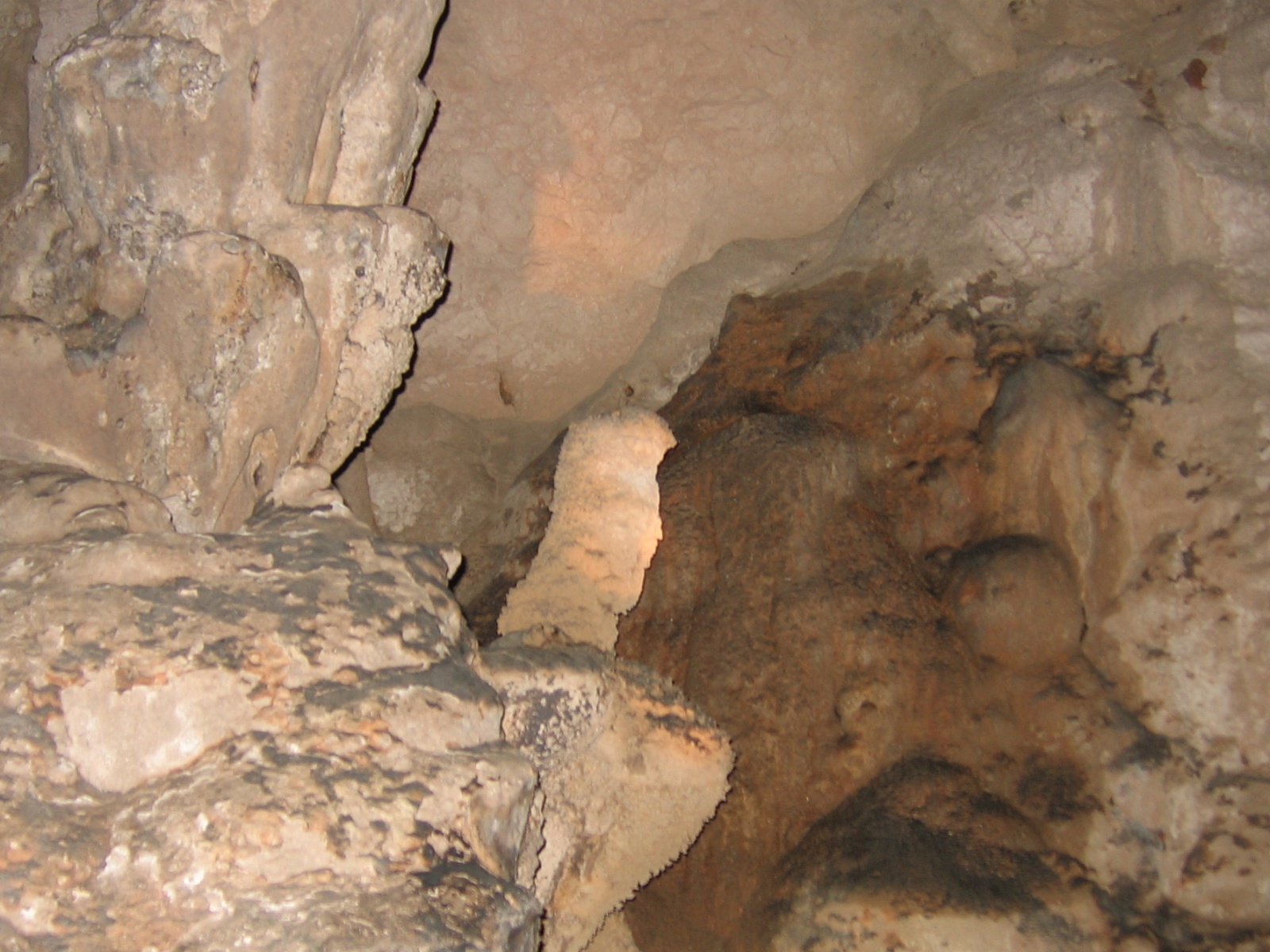
Speleothem inside Ta Ko Bi Cave

Thi Lo Su Waterfall is the main reason people travel to Umphang. It is the largest waterfall in Thailand, with a height of about 200 meters and total width is about 400 meters. It is fullest during rainy season from June to November because of the larger water flow. However, during this period, road access to the waterfall is closed for safety reasons and some hiking is required. The peak season for tourism is in December and January when the water level is still high and the road to waterfall (25 km) is open to the public. Only cars with four wheel drive can pass this steep and slippery road. An alternative way to reach the waterfall is by whitewater rafting downstream along the calm section of Klong River and then continuing overland on foot or by car for another about 12 km. Travelling this way, two waterfalls dropping into Klong River can be seen: Thi Lor Jor Waterfall (น้ำตกทีลอจ่อ), and Sai Rung Waterfall (น้ำตกสายรุ้ง). The name Thi Lo Su, in Karen language, means giant waterfall or black waterfall.

It is only recently that Thi Lo Re Waterfall (น้ำตกทีลอเร) has been promoted. It is a waterfall dropping directly into Klong River deep in Thungyai Naresuan Wildlife Sanctuary with no road access. Only traveling with tour companies is possible. The journey to the waterfall typically involves white water rafting the Klong River of about 40 km through rapids of Class 4 or 5 while the journey back is by walking or riding elephants. The trip takes two to three days.

Pre To Lo Su (น้ำตกเปรโต๊ะลอซู) or Pi Tu Kro Lo Su (น้ำตกปี๊ตรุโกรลอซู) is another recently discovered waterfall. It is on Ma Muang Sam Muen (เขามะม่วงสามหมี่น). Two steams fall to combine to become a heart-shaped waterfall. Travel to and from the waterfall requires a few days of hiking.

Some other places of interest are Takobi Cave (ถ้ำตะโค๊ะบิ), a cave formerly used by Communist Party of Thailand; Doi Hua Mot (ดอยหัวหมด), a viewpoint above the clouds; and Ban Pa La Ta (บ้านปะละทะ), a Karen village dating back 250 years.

== Administration ==
The district is divided into six sub-districts (tambons), which are further subdivided into 38 villages (mubans). The township (thesaban tambon) Umphang covers parts of the tambon Umphang.

No.	Name	Thai name	Villages	Pop.
1.	Umphang	อุ้มผาง	6	4,138
2.	Nong Luang	หนองหลวง	4	2,013
3.	Mokro	โมโกร	7	5,488
4.	Mae Chan	แม่จัน	12	10,246
5.	Mae Lamung	แม่ละมุ้ง	5	1,650
6.	Mae Khlong	แม่กลอง	4	2,222
