= Chum Ta Bong district =

Chum Ta Bong ชุมตาบง
- District
- District location in Nakhon Sawan province
- Coordinates: 15°37′54″N 99°33′10″E
- Country: Thailand
- Province: Nakhon Sawan
- Seat: Chum Ta Bong

Area
  - Total: 379.04 km^{2} (146.35 sq mi)

Population (2016)
  - Total: 18,997
  - Density: 50.119/km^{2} (129.81/sq mi)
- Time zone: UTC+7 (ICT)
- Postal code: 60150
- Geocode: 6015

Chum Ta Bong (Thai: ชุมตาบง, pronounced [t͡ɕʰūm tāː bōŋ]) is a district (amphoe) in the western part of Nakhon Sawan province, central Thailand.

== History ==
The Chum Ta Bong community was established by the people from Tambon Wang Mueang, Lat Yao district in 1967. They had Mr. Bong Charawan (นายบง ชาระวัน) as their leader. The community was in Tambon Huai Nam Hom.

When the government established the minor district Mae Wong in 1992, Huai Nam Hom was included in the district. Later Huai Nam Hom was divided to become three tambons: Huai Nam Hom, Chum Ta Bong, and Pang Sawan.

Effective on 1 July 1997, Tambon Chum Ta Bong and Pang Sawan were separated from Mae Wong to become the minor district (king amphoe) Chum Ta Bong.

On 15 May 2007, all of Thailand's 81 minor districts were upgraded to full districts. With publication in the Royal Gazette on 24 August the upgrade became official .

== Geography ==
Neighboring districts are (from the north clockwise) Mae Wong and Lat Yao of Nakhon Sawan Province, Sawang Arom and Lan Sak of Uthai Thani province, and Mae Poen of Nakhon Sawan.

== Administration ==
The district is divided into two sub-districts (tambons), which are further subdivided into 22 villages (mubans). There are no municipal (thesaban) areas, and two tambon administrative organizations (TAO).

No.	Name	Thai name	Villages	Pop.
1.	Chum Ta Bong	ชุมตาบง	12	11,623
2.	Pang Sawan	ปางสวรรค์	10	6,746
