= Ban Takhli railway station =

Railway station in Thailand

Coordinates: 15.2563°N 100.3501°E

Ban Takhli บ้านตาคลี

General information
- Location: Pracha Takhli Road, Takhli Subdistrict, Takhli District, Nakhon Sawan
- Owner: State Railway of Thailand
- Line: Northern Line
- Platforms: 1
- Tracks: 4

Other information
- Station code: ตล.

History
- Opened: 31 October 1905; 120 years ago
- Former names: Takhli

Services
Preceding station	State Railway of Thailand	Following station
Phon Thong towards Hua Lamphong or Krung Thep Aphiwat	Northern Line	Dong Maku towards Chiang Mai
Location

Ban Takhli station (Thai: สถานีบ้านตาคลี) is a railway station located in Takhli Subdistrict, Takhli District, Nakhon Sawan, Thailand. It is located 193.017 km from Bangkok railway station and is a class 1 railway station. It is on the Northern Line of the State Railway of Thailand. The station opened on 31 October 1905 as part of the Northern Line extension from Lopburi to Pak Nam Pho.
