= Nakhon Sawan United F.C. =

Thai football club

Nakhon Sawan United นครสวรรค์ ยูไนเต็ด
- Full name: Nakhon Sawan United Football Club สโมสรฟุตบอลนครสวรรค์ ยูไนเต็ด
- Founded: 2017; 8 years ago
- Ground: ? Nakhon Sawan, Thailand
- League: 2017 Thailand Amateur League Northern Region

Nakhon Sawan United Football Club (Thai สโมสรฟุตบอลนครสวรรค์ ยูไนเต็ด), is a Thai football club based in Nakhon Sawan, Thailand. The club was formed in August 2017. The club is currently playing in the 2017 Thailand Amateur League Northern Region.

== Record ==
Season	League									FA Cup	League Cup	Top goalscorer	
Season	Division	P	W	D	L	F	A	Pts	Pos	FA Cup	League Cup	Name	Goals
2017	TA North									Not Enter	Can't Enter		
2018	TA North									Not Enter	Can't Enter		

Champions	Runners-up	Promoted	Relegated
