= Lan Sak district =

Lan Sak ลานสัก
- District
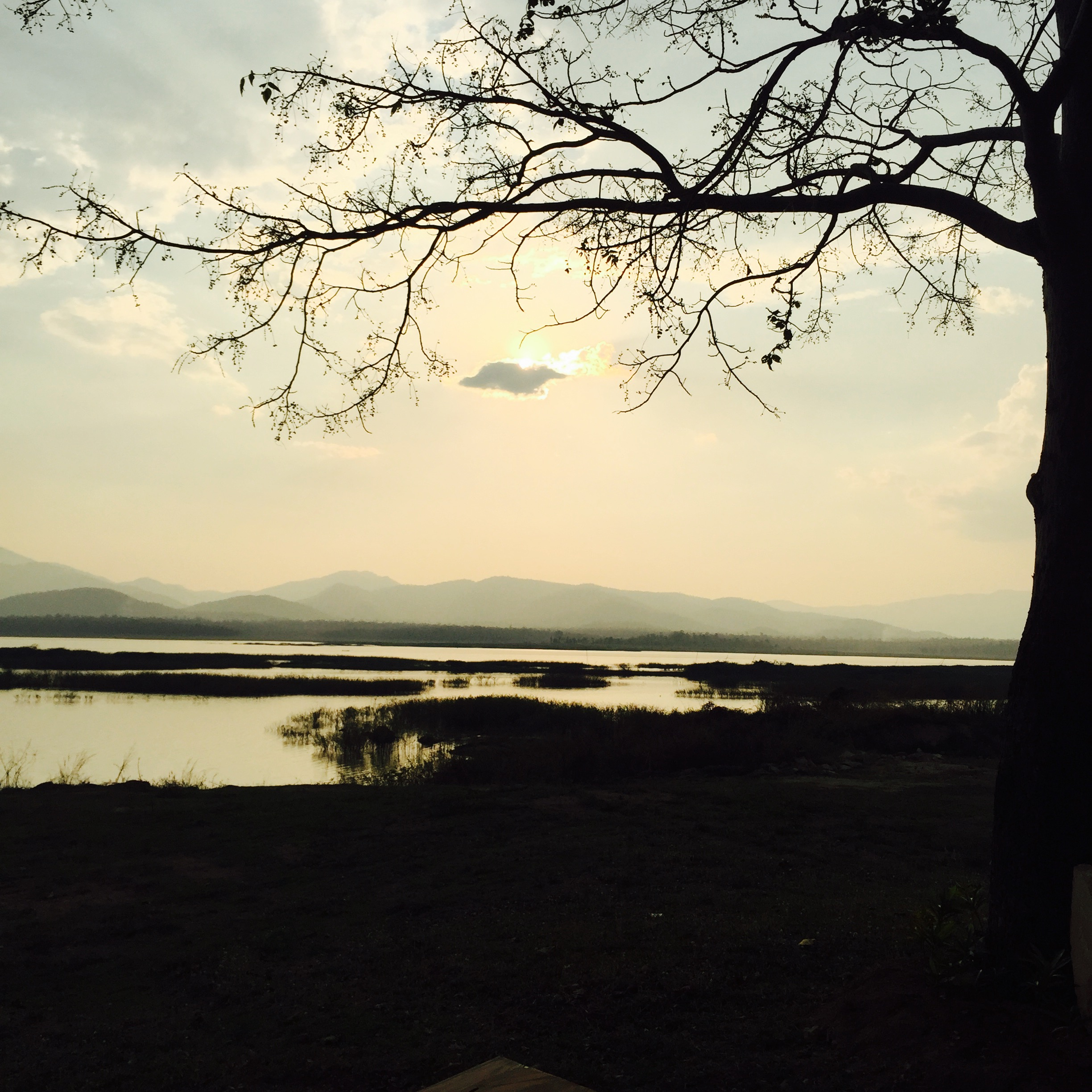
- View of Rabam

- District location in Uthai Thani province
- Coordinates: 15°27′10″N 99°34′34″E
- Country: Thailand
- Province: Uthai Thani
- Seat: Lan Sak

Area
  - Total: 1,080.4 km^{2} (417.1 sq mi)

Population (2005)
  - Total: 57,548
  - Density: 53.3/km^{2} (138/sq mi)
- Time zone: UTC+7 (ICT)
- Postal code: 61160
- Geocode: 6107

Lan Sak (Thai: ลานสัก, pronounced [lāːn sàk]) is a district (amphoe) in northern Uthai Thani province, northern Thailand.

== History ==
Tambons Lan Sak and Pradu Yuen of Ban Rai district were combined as a minor district (king amphoe) on 15 October 1975. The minor district office was in Ban Pak Muean. It was upgraded to a full district on 13 July 1981. At the same time, the office was moved to Ban Kao.

== Geography ==
Neighboring districts are (from the east clockwise) Sawang Arom, Thap Than, Nong Chang, Huai Khot, and Ban Rai of Uthai Thani Province; Mae Poen and Chum Ta Bong of Nakhon Sawan province.

The important water resources are the Huai Thap Salao reservoir and Kha Khaeng River (Huai Kha Khaeng).

== Administration ==
The district is divided into six sub-districts (tambons), which are further subdivided into 81 villages (mubans). The township (thesaban tambon) Lan Sak covers parts of tambons Lan Sak and Pradu Yuen. There are a further six tambon administrative organizations (TAO).

No.	Name	Thai name	Villages	Pop.
1.	Lan Sak	ลานสัก	10	13,905
2.	Pradu Yuen	ประดู่ยืน	12	6,697
3.	Pa O	ป่าอ้อ	10	7,358
4.	Rabam	ระบำ	19	12,573
5.	Nam Rop	น้ำรอบ	18	9,635
6.	Thung Na Ngam	ทุ่งนางาม	12	7,380

== Nature ==
Hup Pa Tat is a broad valley located in the north of Uthai Thani Province.
