= Salokbat =

Salokbat สลกบาตร
- Tambon
- Interactive map of Salokbat
- Coordinates: 15°59′59.2″N 99°48′18.7″E
- Country: Thailand
- Province: Kamphaeng Phet
- Amphoe: Khanu Woralaksaburi

Population (2018)
  - Total: 11,789
- Time zone: UTC+7 (TST)
- Postal code: 62140
- TIS 1099: 620406

Salokbat (Thai: สลกบาตร, pronounced [sā.lòk.bāːt]) is a tambon (sub-district) of Amphoe Khanu Woralaksaburi, Kamphaeng Phet Province, upper central Thailand. In 2018 it had a total population of 11,789 people.

It is important as a rest area for buses that travel between Bangkok and many provinces in the north. There are restrooms and souvenir shops with restaurants serving buffet for passengers of some bus companies.

== Administration ==
=== Central administration ===
The tambon is subdivided into 7 administrative villages (muban).

No.	Name	Thai
1.	Ban Salokbat	บ้านสลกบาตร
2.	Ban Non Po Daeng	บ้านโนนปอแดง
3.	Ban Non Po Daeng	บ้านโนนปอแดง
4.	Ban Wang Salak Phra	บ้านวังสลักพระ
5.	Ban Nuea	บ้านเหนือ
6.	Ban Rang Thaeo	บ้านรังแถว
7.	Ban Utsahakam Ying Charoen	บ้านอุตสาหกรรมยิ่งเจริญ

=== Local administration ===
The area of the subdistrict is shared by 2 local governments.

- the subdistrict municipality (Thesaban Tambon) Salokbat (เทศบาลตำบลสลกบาตร)
- the subdistrict administrative organization (SAO) Salokbat (องค์การบริหารส่วนตำบลสลกบาตร)
