= Lat Yao district =

Lat Yao ลาดยาว
- District
- District location in Nakhon Sawan province
- Coordinates: 15°45′15″N 99°47′26″E
- Country: Thailand
- Province: Nakhon Sawan

Area
  - Total: 691.1 km^{2} (266.8 sq mi)

Population (2005)
  - Total: 91,704
  - Density: 132.7/km^{2} (343.7/sq mi)
- Time zone: UTC+7 (ICT)
- Postal code: 60150
- Geocode: 6011

Lat Yao (Thai: ลาดยาว, pronounced [lâːt jāːw]) is a district (amphoe) of Nakhon Sawan province, central Thailand.

== History ==
Originally, Lat Yao was part of Krok Phra district. Khun Lat Boriban (ขุนลาดบริบาล), the head of the tambon, developed the infrastructure of the tambon. In 1913, he proposed to the governor of Nakhon Sawan that the tambon should be upgraded to a district. The proposal was approved and the new district created.

== Geography ==
Neighboring districts are (from the north clockwise): Khanu Woralaksaburi of Kamphaeng Phet province, Banphot Phisai, Mueang Nakhon Sawan and Krok Phra of Nakhon Sawan Province, Sawang Arom of Uthai Thani province, and Chum Ta Bong and Mae Wong of Nakhon Sawan.

== Environment ==
The Sakrae Krang River flows through the district. The Department of Royal Irrigation (RID) has declared its intention to build a dam on the river in the district. The dam has attracted significant local opposition. Opponents have rejected four health and environment impact assessments (EHIA), pointing out that they fail to address mitigation and the impact on the forest ecology.

== Administration ==
The district is divided into 12 sub-districts (tambons), which are further subdivided into 149 villages (mubans). Lat Yao and Sanchao Kai To are two townships (thesaban tambon), each covering parts of the same-named tambon. There are a further 12 tambon administrative organizations (TAO).

No.	Name	Thai name	Villages	Pop.
1.	Lat Yao	ลาดยาว	21	18,811
2.	Huai Nam Hom	ห้วยน้ำหอม	9	6,773
3.	Wang Ma	วังม้า	16	6,883
4.	Wang Mueang	วังเมือง	10	3,082
5.	Soi Lakhon	สร้อยละคร	10	2,693
6.	Map Kae	มาบแก	7	2,590
7.	Nong Yao	หนองยาว	9	4,823
8.	Nong Nom Wua	หนองนมวัว	9	5,149
9.	Ban Rai	บ้านไร่	24	12,611
10.	Noen Khilek	เนินขี้เหล็ก	12	6,506
16.	Sanchao Kai To	ศาลเจ้าไก่ต่อ	12	13,491
17.	Sa Kaeo	สระแก้ว	10	8,292

The missing numbers 11-15 were split off as Mae Wong district

== Places ==
- Wat Khao Samuk

== In media ==
Lat Yao, especially Nong Nom Wua, was the backdrop for 2015's popular TV drama, Channel 3's Sud Kaen Saen Ruk.
