= Mae Wong district =

Mae Wong แม่วงก์
- District
- District location in Nakhon Sawan province
- Coordinates: 15°46′52″N 99°31′9″E
- Country: Thailand
- Province: Nakhon Sawan
- Seat: Mae Wong

Area
  - Total: 766.8 km^{2} (296.1 sq mi)

Population (2005)
  - Total: 52,705
  - Density: 68.73/km^{2} (178.0/sq mi)
- Time zone: UTC+7 (ICT)
- Postal code: 60150
- Geocode: 6013

Mae Wong (Thai: แม่วงก์, pronounced [mɛ̂ː wōŋ]) is a district (amphoe) in the western part of Nakhon Sawan province, central Thailand.

== History ==
The minor district (king amphoe) Mae Wong was created on 1 April 1992, when the six tambons: Mae Wong, Mae Le, Wang San, Khao Chon Kan, Pang Sawan, and Huai Nam Hom were split off from Lat Yao district. Huai Nam Hom was returned to Lat Yai District on 1 December 1994. On 11 October 1997 the minor district was upgraded to a full district.

== Geography ==
Mae Wong is the name of the river in Mae Wong National Park.

Neighboring districts are (from the north clockwise): Pang Sila Thong and Khanu Woralaksaburi of Kamphaeng Phet province, Lat Yao, Chum Ta Bong, and Mae Poen of Nakhon Sawan Province, and Umphang of Tak province.

== Administration ==
The district is divided into four sub-districts (tambons), which are further subdivided into 67 villages (mubans). There are no municipal (thesaban) areas and a further four tambon administrative organizations (TAO).

No.	Name	Thai name	Villages	Pop.
1.	Mae Wong	แม่วงก์	9	6,914
3.	Mae Le	แม่เล่ย์	26	18,751
4.	Wang San	วังซ่าน	14	12,569
5.	Khao Chon Kan	เขาชนกัน	18	14,471

The missing number 2 was given to Huai Nam Hom, which was reassigned back to Lat Yao district.

== See also ==
- Mae Wong Dam
