= Rabam =

Subdistrict of Thailand

Coordinates: 15.550033°N 99.446372°E

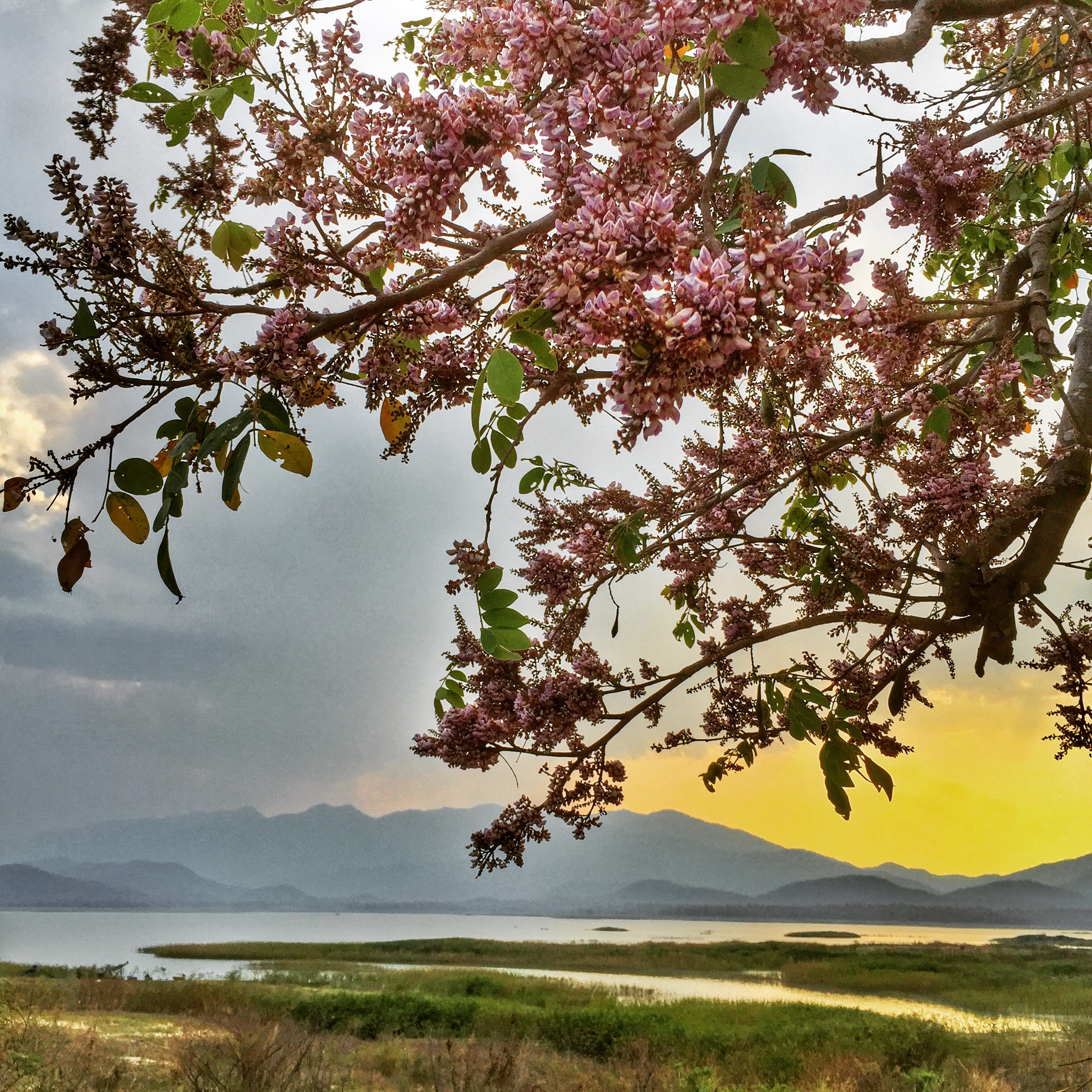
View of Rabam

Rabam (Thai: ระบำ) is a tambon (subdistrict) of Lan Sak district, Uthai Thani province, central Thailand.

== Toponymy & geography ==
Rabam is the name comes from a mountain called "Nangram" (นางรำ). However, when the name of the subdistrict was established, the folks felt that it was not sweetly. So the name was changed to Rabam, which has a similar pronunciation.

The area is the forest margin of Huai Kha Khaeng Wildlife Sanctuary, a UNESCO-certified World Heritage site known for its rich biodiversity.

Tabsalao Reservoir is a main water resource and also a landmark, an abundant fishing ground with breathtaking landscapes where elephants, gaurs, deer and various bird species are commonly spotted foraging.

== Demography ==
The majority of the population is immigrants from all over the region. Some people come from Prachinburi province. Because of the abundance of the area.

In late 2022, it had a total population of 13,548 people.

== Administration ==
The whole area of the subdistrict is covered by Rabam Subdistrict Administrative Organization (องค์การบริหารส่วนตำบลระบำ).

Rabam is also divided into 19 mubans (villages).

== Transportation ==
Highway 3438 is a main road.
