= Sawang Arom district =

Sawang Arom สว่างอารมณ์
- District
- District location in Uthai Thani province
- Coordinates: 15°35′2″N 99°51′39″E
- Country: Thailand
- Province: Uthai Thani
- Seat: Sawang Arom
- District established: 1960

Area
  - Total: 341.4 km^{2} (131.8 sq mi)

Population (2008)
  - Total: 31,092
  - Density: 91.1/km^{2} (236/sq mi)
- Time zone: UTC+7 (ICT)
- Postal code: 61150
- Geocode: 6103

Sawang Arom (Thai: สว่างอารมณ์, pronounced [sā.wàːŋ ʔāː.rōm]) is a district (amphoe) in the northern part of Uthai Thani province, northern Thailand.

== History ==
This area was originally called Ban Sawang Chaeng Sabai Chai. In a Thai-Burmese war of Ayutthaya era, the troops began fighting in the Lat Yao district area at night and finished at the village in the morning. To commemorate this battle the government renamed the village Sawang Arom in 1961.

The Sawang Arom minor district (king amphoe) was established in 1960 as a subordinate of Thap Than district by splitting off four sub-districts from Thap Than. It was upgraded to a full district in 1963.

== Geography ==
Neighboring districts are (from the east clockwise) Thap Than, Lan Sak of Uthai Thani Province, Lat Yao and Krok Phra of Nakhon Sawan province.

== Administration ==
The district is divided into five sub-districts (tambons), which are further subdivided into 64 villages (mubans). Sawang Arom is a sub-district municipality (thesaban tambon) which covers parts of tambon Sawang Arom. There are a further five tambon administrative organizations (TAO).

No.	Name	Thai	Villages	Pop.
1.	Sawang Arom	สว่างอารมณ์	10	4,967
2.	Nong Luang	หนองหลวง	10	4,128
3.	Phluang Song Nang	พลวงสองนาง	8	5,360
4.	Phai Khiao	ไผ่เขียว	24	11,693
5.	Bo Yang	บ่อยาง	12	5,236
