= Bueng Samakkhi district =

Bueng Samakkhi บึงสามัคคี
- District
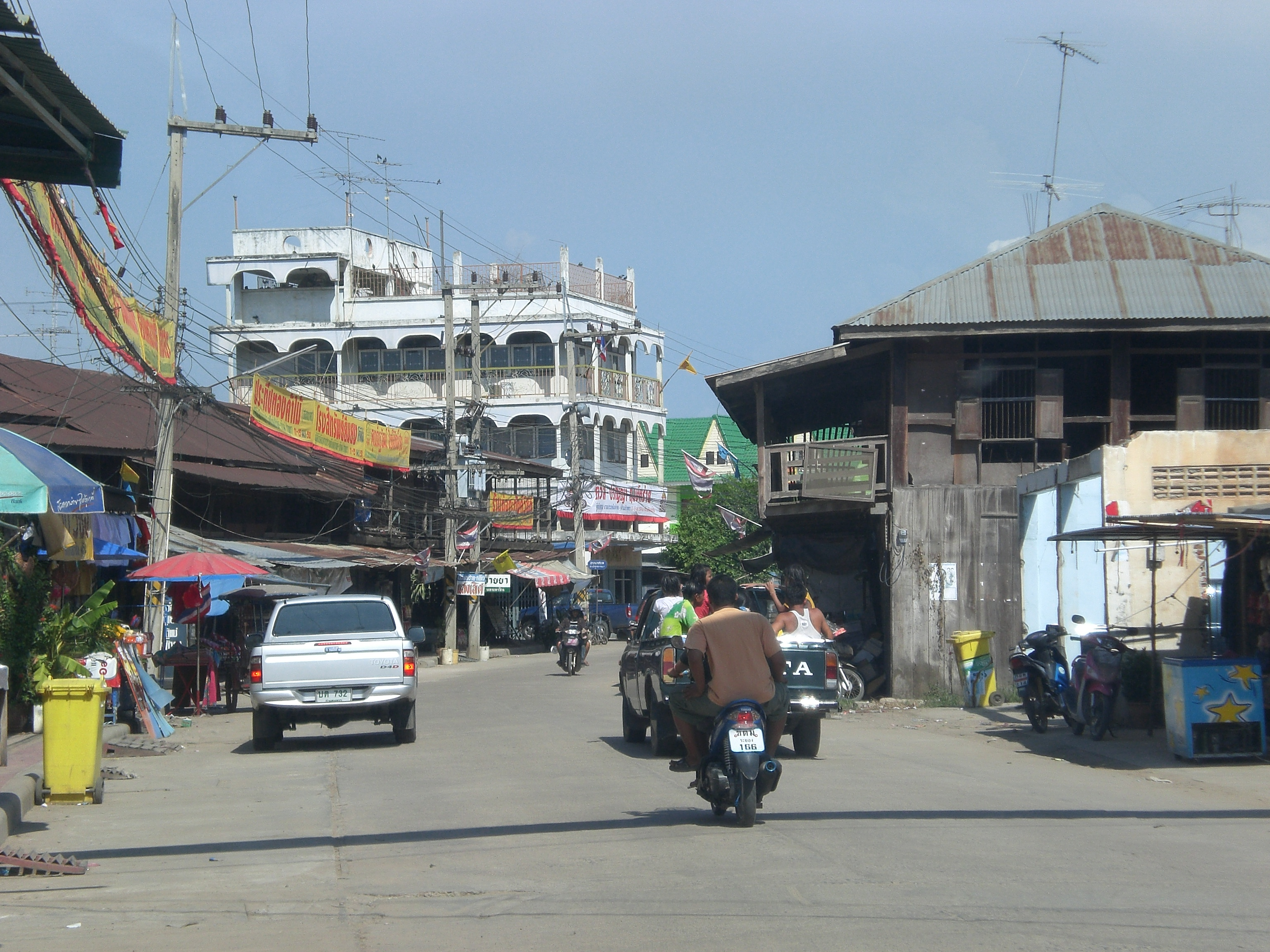
- Bueng Samakkhi

- District location in Kamphaeng Phet province
- Coordinates: 16°11′18″N 99°58′39″E
- Country: Thailand
- Province: Kamphaeng Phet
- Seat: Wang Cha-on

Area
  - Total: 377.186 km^{2} (145.632 sq mi)

Population (2005)
  - Total: 26,663
  - Density: 70.7/km^{2} (183/sq mi)
- Time zone: UTC+7 (ICT)
- Postal code: 62210
- Geocode: 6210

Bueng Samakkhi (Thai: บึงสามัคคี, pronounced [bɯ̄ŋ sǎː.mák.kʰīː]) is a district (amphoe) in the eastern part of Kamphaeng Phet province, central Thailand.

== History ==
Tambon Rahan, Wang Cha-on, and Bueng Samakkhi were separated from Khanu Woralaksaburi district to form the minor district (king amphoe) Bueng Samakkhi on 30 April 1994. The government selected the name Bueng Samakkhi to commemorate the unity of the people in the district.

On 15 May 2007, all 81 minor districts were upgraded to full districts. On August 24 the upgrade became official.

== Geography ==
Neighboring districts are (from the south clockwise) Khanu Woralaksaburi, Khlong Khlung, Sai Thong Watthana of Kamphaeng Phet Province, Sam Ngam, Pho Prathap Chang and Bueng Na Rang of Phichit province.

== Administration ==
The district is divided into four sub-districts (tambons), which are further subdivided into 45 villages (mubans). There are no municipal (thesaban) areas. There are four tambon administrative organizations (TAO).

No.	Name	Thai name	Villages	Pop.
1.	Bueng Samakkhi	บึงสามัคคี	12	4,917
2.	Wang Cha-on	วังชะโอน	14	9,028
3.	Rahan	ระหาน	10	7,532
4.	Thep Nimit	เทพนิมิต	9	5,186
