= Khlong Khlung district =

Khlong Khlung คลองขลุง
- District
- District location in Kamphaeng Phet province
- Coordinates: 16°13′0″N 99°43′12″E
- Country: Thailand
- Province: Kamphaeng Phet
- Seat: Khlong Khlung

Area
  - Total: 1,185.4 km^{2} (457.7 sq mi)

Population (2005)
  - Total: 74,812
  - Density: 63.1/km^{2} (163/sq mi)
- Time zone: UTC+7 (ICT)
- Postal code: 62120
- Geocode: 6205

Khlong Khlung (Thai: คลองขลุง, pronounced [kʰlɔ̄ːŋ kʰlǔŋ]) is a district (amphoe) in the central part of Kamphaeng Phet province, central Thailand.

== Geography ==
Neighbouring districts are (from the north clockwise): Mueang Kamphaeng Phet, Sai Thong Watthana, Bueng Samakkhi, Khanu Woralaksaburi, Pang Sila Thong and Khlong Lan of Kamphaeng Phet Province.

== History ==
The district Khanu was renamed Khlong Khlung in 1939.

== Administration ==
The district is divided into 10 subdistricts (tambons), which are further subdivided into 101 villages (mubans). There are three townships (thesaban tambons): Khlong Khlung, Tha Makhuea, and Tha Phutsa. Each cover parts of the same-named tambon. There are a further 10 tambon administrative organizations (TAO).

No.	Name	Thai name	Villages	Pop.
1.	Khlong Khlung	คลองขลุง	13	13,503
2.	Tha Makhuea	ท่ามะเขือ	9	8,551
4.	Tha Phutsa	ท่าพุทรา	7	4,950
5.	Mae Lat	แม่ลาด	6	4,015
6.	Wang Yang	วังยาง	9	5,999
7.	Wang Khaem	วังแขม	15	10,296
8.	Hua Thanon	หัวถนน	9	5,181
9.	Wang Sai	วังไทร	14	10,957
13.	Wang Bua	วังบัว	10	7,158
16.	Khlong Sombun	คลองสมบูรณ์	9	4,202

Missing numbers are tambon which now form districts Sai Thong Watthana and Pang Sila Thong.
