= Phayuha Khiri district =

Phayuha Khiri พยุหะคีรี
- District
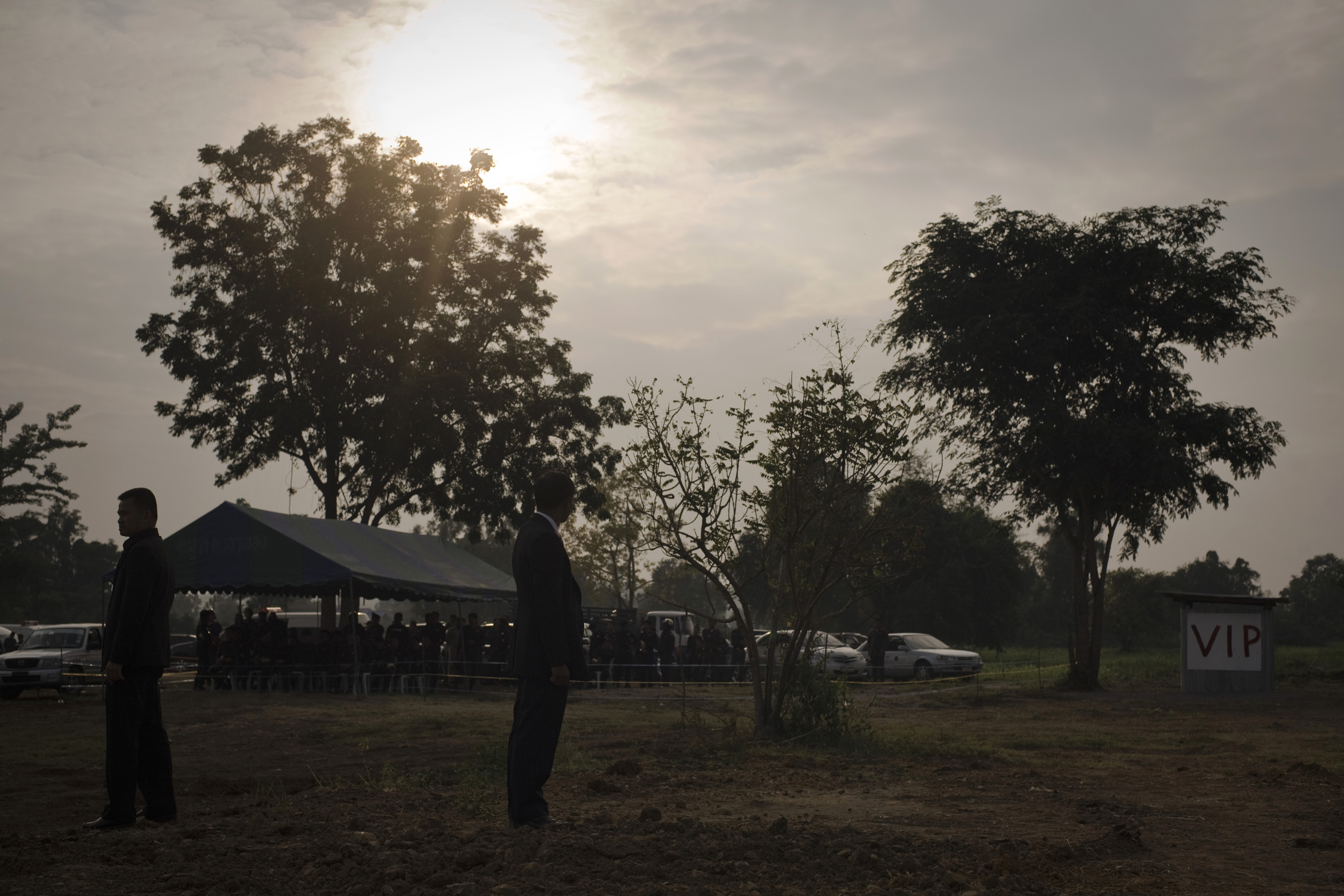
- Khao Thong, Phayuha Khiri on November 6, 2010

- District location in Nakhon Sawan province
- Coordinates: 15°29′14″N 100°8′24″E
- Country: Thailand
- Province: Nakhon Sawan
- Tambon: 11
- Muban: 125

Area
  - Total: 740.8 km^{2} (286.0 sq mi)

Population (2012)
  - Total: 62,508
  - Density: 84.38/km^{2} (218.5/sq mi)
- Time zone: UTC+7 (ICT)
- Postal code: 60130
- Geocode: 6010

Phayuha Khiri (Thai: พยุหะคีรี, pronounced [pʰā.jú.hàʔ kʰīː.rīː]) is a district (amphoe) in Nakhon Sawan province, central Thailand.

== History ==
Phayuha Khiri is an ancient city. It was at the midpoint of two larger cities, Phra Bang (today Nakhon Sawan) and Chainat Buri (today Chai Nat), along the standard military route used by troops of Sukhothai and Ayutthaya.

Recently the district office was relocated to Tambon Sa Thale.

Its name "Phayuha Khiri" meaning "procession of the mountains", since the area consists of many small and large hills. Some hills are beautiful and are home to both temples and Buddha statues on the top.

== Geography ==
Neighbouring districts are (from the north clockwise): Krok Phra, Mueang Nakhon Sawan, Tha Tako, Tak Fa, and Takhli of Nakhon Sawan Province; Manorom of Chai Nat province; and Mueang Uthai Thani of Uthai Thani province.

== Administration ==
The district is divided into 11 sub-districts (tambons), which are further subdivided into 125 villages (mubans). There are two sub-district municipalities (thesaban tambon): Phayuha covering parts of tambon Phayuha, and Tha Nam Oi covering tambons Tha Nam Oi and Muang Hak. There are a further nine tambon administrative organizations (TAO).

No.	Name	Thai	Villages	Pop.
1.	Phayuha	พยุหะ	9	10,851
2.	Noen Makok	เนินมะกอก	12	5,803
3.	Nikhom Khao Bo Kaeo	นิคมเขาบ่อแก้ว	16	6,369
4.	Muang Hak	ม่วงหัก	10	2,299
5.	Yang Khao	ยางขาว	9	3,907
6.	Yan Matsi	ย่านมัทรี	7	4,785
7.	Khao Thong	เขาทอง	12	7,488
8.	Tha Nam Oi	ท่าน้ำอ้อย	8	2,840
9.	Nam Song	น้ำทรง	11	6,386
10.	Khao Kala	เขากะลา	19	8,552
11.	Sa Thale	สระทะเล	12	3,228

== Education ==
Phayuha Khiri is the location of Mahidol University Nakhon Sawan Campus.
