= Takhli =

Coordinates: 15°16′N 100°21′E

- Village
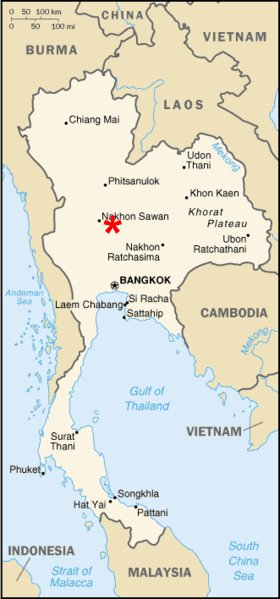
- Location of Takhli RTAFB, Thailand
- Interactive map of Takhli
- Country: Thailand
- Province: Chiang Mai
- Regency: Bangkok

Takhli is a town in the province of Nakhon Sawan in northern Thailand. The population (2005) is 42,700. It is the site of the Takhli Royal Thai Air Force Base.

The town lies on the train line between Bangkok and Chiang Mai and at the Highway 11.
