= Tak Fa district =

Tak Fa ตากฟ้า
- District
- District location in Nakhon Sawan province
- Coordinates: 15°20′55.8″N 100°29′44.8″E
- Country: Thailand
- Province: Nakhon Sawan
- Seat: Tak Fa

Area
  - Total: 570.7 km^{2} (220.3 sq mi)

Population (2005)
  - Total: 41,192
  - Density: 72.18/km^{2} (186.9/sq mi)
- Time zone: UTC+7 (ICT)
- Postal code: 60190
- Geocode: 6012

Tak Fa (Thai: ตากฟ้า, pronounced [tàːk fáː]) is a district (amphoe) in southeastern part of Nakhon Sawan province.

== History ==
When Thai government built the Phahonyothin Highway, the district was formed by territory taken from Takhli district. It became a district on 13 October 1970.

The name "Tak Fa" is derived from the Thai phrase meaning "sun drying" or "sunbath." In the past, the area consisted mainly of open ground and forest, so villagers would spread their clothes out to dry in the sun and referred to the place as "Lan Tak Pha" (ลานตากผ้า, pronounced [lǎːn tàːk pʰâː], lit. 'clothes-drying ground'). Over time, the name gradually changed in pronunciation to "Tak Fa."

Historically, Tak Fa was the hometown of Luang Si Yot, a nobleman during the Ayutthaya period. He was among the conspirators who overthrew Khun Worawongsathirat, the usurper king of Ayutthaya, and Lady Sisudachan. His allies included Khun Pirenthorathep (later King Maha Thammaracha), Muen Racha Saneha, and Khun Intharathep. The Siamese chronicles record him as "Luang Si Yot of Ban Lan Tak Fa."

== Geography ==
Neighboring districts are (from the southwest clockwise): Takhli, Phayuha Khiri, Tha Tako, and Phaisali of Nakhon Sawan Province, and Nong Muang of Lopburi province.

== Administration ==
The district is divided into seven sub-districts (tambons), which are further subdivided into 77 villages (mubans). The township (thesaban tambon) of Tak Fa covers parts of the tambon Tak Fa and Suk Samran. There are a further seven tambon administrative organizations (TAO).

No.	Name	Thai name	Villages	Pop.
1.	Tak Fa	ตากฟ้า	10	7,292
2.	Lam Phayon	ลำพยนต์	12	4,724
3.	Suk Samran	สุขสำราญ	11	7,628
4.	Nong Phikun	หนองพิกุล	10	3,471
5.	Phu Nok Yung	พุนกยูง	16	3,850
6.	Udom Thanya	อุดมธัญญา	9	10,438
7.	Khao Chai Thong	เขาชายธง	9	3,789
