= Krok Phra district =

Krok Phra โกรกพระ
- District
- District location in Nakhon Sawan province
- Coordinates: 15°33′24″N 100°4′24″E
- Country: Thailand
- Province: Nakhon Sawan
- Tambon: 9
- Muban: 65

Area
  - Total: 297.194 km^{2} (114.747 sq mi)

Population (2015)
  - Total: 35,923
  - Density: 120.87/km^{2} (313.06/sq mi)
- Time zone: UTC+7 (ICT)
- Postal code: 60170
- Geocode: 6002

Krok Phra (Thai: โกรกพระ, pronounced [kròːk pʰráʔ]) is a district (amphoe) in Nakhon Sawan province, central Thailand.

== History ==
Originally, the district was named Noen Sala. However, as the old location was not convenient, the district office was moved to the west bank of the Chao Phraya River at Ban Krok Phra in 1899. The name of the district was then changed accordingly.

At first, the area was called Ban Krok which means 'village at a steep cliff'. According to the local lore, once an old rich couple from Ayutthaya wanted to move a big Buddha's image from Sukhothai to Ayutthaya on the Chao Phraya River. When it passed Ban Krok, the log broke and the Buddha image sunk into the river and could not be recovered. The residents then started calling their settlement Ban Krok Phra, adding the word phra, meaning 'venerable', to commemorate the event.

== Geography ==
Neighboring districts are (from the north clockwise): Mueang Nakhon Sawan and Phayuha Khiri of Nakhon Sawan Province, and Mueang Uthai Thani, Thap Than, and Sawang Arom of Uthai Thani province.

== Administration ==
=== Central administration ===
Krok Phra is divided into nine sub-districts (tambons), which are further subdivided into 65 administrative villages (mubans).

| No. | Name | Thai | Villages | Pop. |
|---|---|---|---|---|
| 1. | Krok Phra | โกรกพระ | 8 | 8,570 |
| 2. | Yang Tan | ยางตาล | 9 | 4,253 |
| 3. | Bang Mafo | บางมะฝ่อ | 6 | 4,256 |
| 4. | Bang Pramung | บางประมุง | 8 | 5,053 |
| 5. | Na Klang | นากลาง | 8 | 3,068 |
| 6. | Sala Daeng | ศาลาแดง | 5 | 2,850 |
| 7. | Noen Kwao | เนินกว้าว | 7 | 2,977 |
| 8. | Noen Sala | เนินศาลา | 8 | 2,971 |
| 9. | Hat Sung | หาดสูง | 6 | 1,925 |

=== Local administration ===
There are three sub-district municipalities (thesaban tambons) in the district:

- Krok Phra (Thai: เทศบาลตำบลโกรกพระ) consisting of parts of sub-district Krok Phra.
- Bang Pramung (Thai: เทศบาลตำบลบางประมุง) consisting of sub-district Bang Pramung.
- Bang Mafo (Thai: เทศบาลตำบลบางมะฝ่อ) consisting of sub-district Bang Mafo.

There are seven sub-district administrative organizations (SAO) in the district:

- Krok Phra (Thai: องค์การบริหารส่วนตำบลโกรกพระ) consisting of parts of sub-district Krok Phra.
- Yang Tan (Thai: องค์การบริหารส่วนตำบลยางตาล) consisting of sub-district Yang Tan.
- Na Klang (Thai: องค์การบริหารส่วนตำบลนากลาง) consisting of sub-district Na Klang.
- Sala Daeng (Thai: องค์การบริหารส่วนตำบลศาลาแดง) consisting of sub-district Sala Daeng.
- Noen Kwao (Thai: องค์การบริหารส่วนตำบลเนินกว้าว) consisting of sub-district Noen Kwao.
- Noen Sala (Thai: องค์การบริหารส่วนตำบลเนินศาลา) consisting of sub-district Noen Sala.
- Hat Sung (Thai: องค์การบริหารส่วนตำบลหาดสูง) consisting of sub-district Hat Sung.
