= Chak Phra =

Buddhist festival celebrated in Thailand and Malaysia

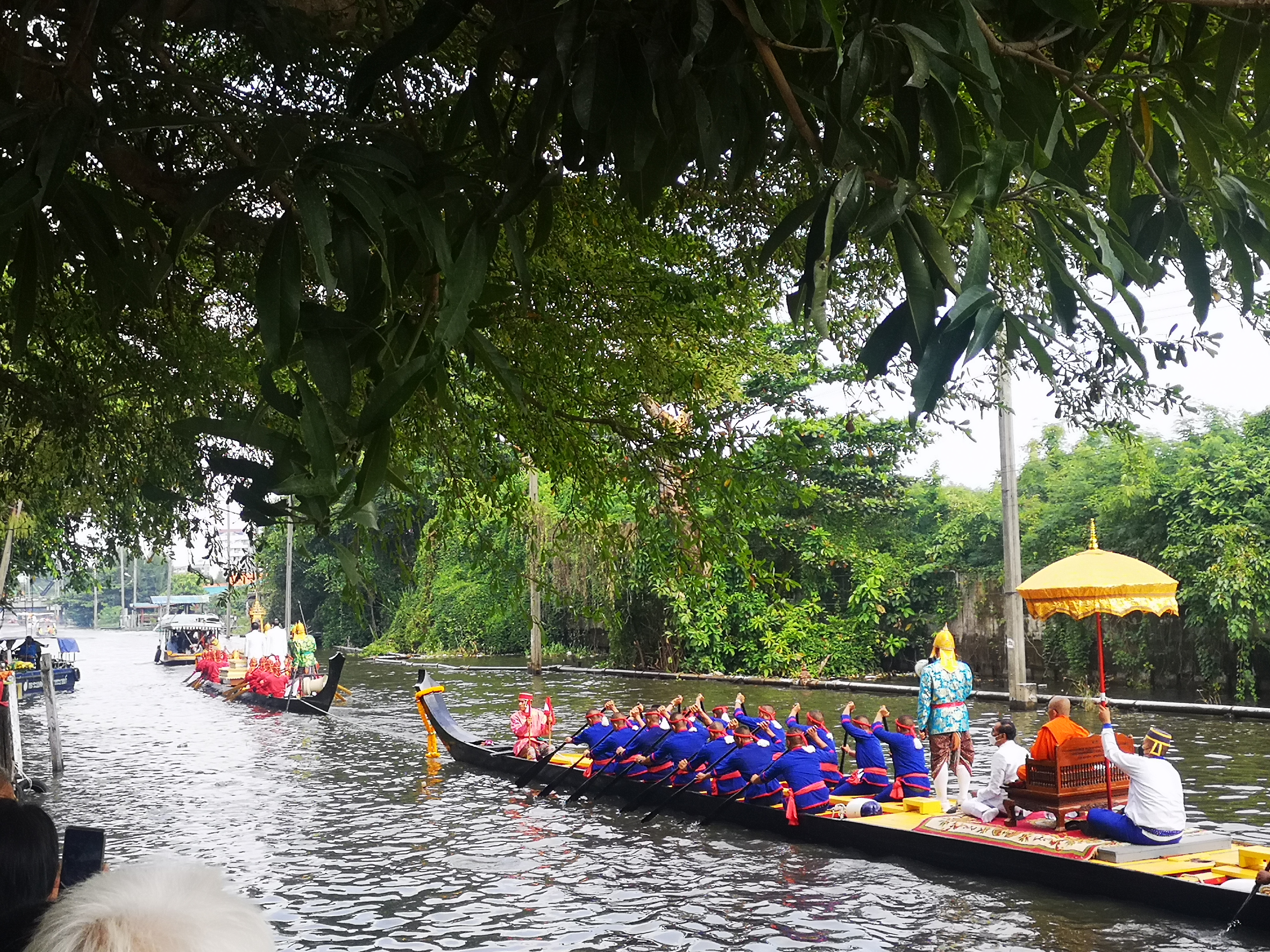
- Official name: Thai: ชักพระ
- Observed by: Thai Buddhists, Malaysian Siamese
- Type: Buddhist
- Significance: Celebrates Buddha’s symbolic return to earth at the end of Buddhist Lent
- Date: 1st waning moon of the 11th lunar month of the Thai lunar calendar
- Frequency: Annual
- Related to: Tak Bat Devo, Wan Ok Phansa

Chak Phra (Thai: ชักพระ, pronounced [t͡ɕʰák pʰráʔ]) is a Buddhist festival that is celebrated annually in Southern Thailand and Northern Malaysia. The name "Chak Phra" could be translated as “Pulling the Buddha”, “pulling of the Buddhist monks”, or “pulling of ceremonial Buddha image carriages”.

Chak Phra takes place in the eleventh lunar month of the traditional Thai lunar calendar on the first day of the waning moon. In the western calendar it usually falls in the month of October. Because the festival is based on a lunar calendar, the exact dates when it takes place change every year.

The largest celebration takes place in Mueang Surat Thani, along the Tapi River. This festival lasts nine days and nine nights. Smaller celebrations also take place throughout the south including: Nakhon Si Thammarat, Phatthalung, Pattani, and Ko Samui.

== Etymology ==
"Chak" (Thai: ชัก) means "to pull" and "Phra" (Thai: พระ) can refer to a monk, god, or Buddha image.

== Origin ==
The tradition is based on the following Buddhist legend:

The Buddha’s mother, Maya, had died seven days after the Buddha-to-be was born. As she had no access to the Buddha’s teachings, he went up to Tavatimsa heaven, where she had been reborn, in order to give her the benefit of hearing the Dhamma. Upon his return to earth, the Buddha descended upon a ladder of crystal accompanied by two Hindu gods who acted as his witnesses and acolytes: Brahma on a ladder of gold at right and Indra on a ladder of silver at left.

— Carol Stratton, "The Legend: The Buddha Descends from Tavatimsa Heaven", Buddhist Sculpture of Northern Thailand (2004)

It is said, that once Buddha had returned to earth, a large crowd gathered to welcome him. He was offered large amounts of food and was invited to ride in a busabok throne.

== Overview ==
Chak Phra is assumed to take place in India under the doctrine of Brahmanism which is a popularly used Buddha statue in a procession on various occasion. Later on, Chak Phra transferred to the Southern Thailand and Northern Malaysia and has been put into practice and became a traditional festival for nowadays. People believe that Chak Phra will cause rainfall during the rainy season because people who are in the ceremony are mainly farmers.

== Description ==
There are two types for this festival. Pulling the Buddha on the land or in the river. Pulling the Buddha Statue on the land is to invite the Buddha statue to the destination which is the temple. This festival is suitable for the temple which is far away from the river. Dragging in the river is to invite the Buddha statue enshrined on the boat and then flock to the destination. This festival is suitable for the temple that is near the river.

=== Ceremonial floats ===
- land floats (Thai: เรือพนมพระทางบก; RTGS: ruea phanom phra thang bok)
- river floats (Thai: เรือพนมพระ; RTGS: ruea phanom phra)

== Customs ==
The main activities during Chak Phra in Mueang Surat Thani include:

- Putting up donation trees (Thai: ชักพุ่มผ้าป่า; RTGS: chak phum pha pa) in front of houses for the Buddhist monks. These donation trees are like Buddhist Christmas trees decorated with money, food, toiletries, and other items that the monks may need. There are over 2,000 registered donation trees around Mueang Surat Thani.
- Display of ceremonial land floats (Thai: เรือพนมพระทางบก; RTGS: ruea phanom phra thang bok) from over 100 local Buddhist temples
- Pulling of the ceremonial land floats (Thai: ชักพระ; RTGS: chak phra) during a morning parade
- Long-boat Races (Thai: แข่งเรือยาว; RTGS: khaeng ruea yao)
- Ceremonial river floats (Thai: เรือพนมพระ; RTGS: ruea phanom phra)
- Colourful displays of the Lord Buddha’s life cycle (Thai: พุ่มผ้าป่า; RTGS: phum pha pa)
- Eating the traditional boiled rice snack of “belief & generosity” (Thai: ขนมต้ม; RTGS: khanom tom)

=== Khanom tom ===
Khanom tom (Thai: ขนมต้ม; literally "boiled snack") is a Southern Thai snack made from sticky rice, coconut milk, sugar, and salt. The mixture is wrapped in young Mangrove Fan Palm leaves (Thai: ใบกะพ้อ), formed into a triangle shape, and then boiled or steamed until cooked. To show their generosity to those who participate in the Chak Phra parade, the snack is usually made in large volumes by community members the day before the parade at various temples around town, the most prominent being Wat Tha Sai in Kanchanadit District, Surat Thani.

Outside of Southern Thailand, khanom tom is usually referred to as "khao tom luk yon" (Thai: ข้าวต้มลูกโยน), as “khanom tom” is also the name of Central Thailand snack made from glutinous boiled rice balls covered in shredded coconut.
