= Takhli district =

Thakli ตาคลี
- District
- District location in Nakhon Sawan province
- Coordinates: 15°15′47″N 100°20′37″E
- Country: Thailand
- Province: Nakhon Sawan
- Seat: Takhli

Area
  - Total: 854.1 km^{2} (329.8 sq mi)

Population (2005)
  - Total: 114,912
  - Density: 134.5/km^{2} (348.5/sq mi)
- Time zone: UTC+7 (ICT)
- Postal code: 60140
- Geocode: 6007

Thakhli (Thai: ตาคลี, pronounced [tāː.kʰlīː]) is the southernmost district (amphoe) of Nakhon Sawan province, Thailand.

== History ==
The name of district originates from the tikli (polo) ground in Sang Thong, a royal novel by King Rama II. The story of Sang Thong was adapted from local folklore of Takhli, which is why many of the district's streets and public utilities are named after characters in the tale.

During the Vietnam War era, Takhli was the site of a United States Air Force base. Today, it remains home to the Takhli Royal Thai Air Force Base, operated by the Royal Thai Air Force (RTAF).

The establishment of the U.S. base led to Takhli becoming a well-known red-light district catering to American G.I.s. In particular, the area around Ban Takhli railway station was filled with pubs, bars, and brothels, earning it the local nickname Thanon Daeng (ถนนแดง, pronounced [tʰā.nǒn dɛ̄ːŋ], lit. 'red street'). Not all of the prostitutes were from Takhli itself; many came from nearby districts such as Taphan Hin, Bang Mun Nak, Thap Khlo, Chum Saeng, and Thap Krit. Today, these once-bustling quarters have long fallen into decline.

== Geography ==
Neighbouring districts are (from the north clockwise): Phayuha Khiri and Tak Fa of Nakhon Sawan; Nong Muang and Ban Mi of Lopburi province; In Buri of Singburi province; and Sapphaya, Mueang Chai Nat, and Manorom of Chai Nat province.

Takhli is 70 km (43.5 mi) south of Mueang Nakhon Sawan, the capital district of the province.

== Administration ==
The district is divided into 11 sub-districts (tambons), which are further subdivided into 128 villages (mubans). Takhli itself has town status (thesaban mueang) and covers part of tambon Takhli. Chong Khae is a township (thesaban tambon) and covers parts of tambons Chong Khae and Phrom Nimit. There are a further 10 tambon administrative organizations (TAO).

No.	Name	Thai name	Villages	Pop.
1.	Takhli	ตาคลี	24	53,322
2.	Chong Khae	ช่องแค	12	9,160
3.	Chan Sen	จันเสน	11	8,131
4.	Huai Hom	ห้วยหอม	11	4,914
5.	Hua Wai	หัวหวาย	14	9,399
6.	Nong Pho	หนองโพ	15	10,519
7.	Nong Mo	หนองหม้อ	7	3,862
8.	Soi Thong	สร้อยทอง	10	4,618
9.	Lat Thippharot	ลาดทิพรส	11	5,201
10.	Phromnimit	พรหมนิมิต	9	5,786

== See also ==
- Takhli
