= Tak Bat Devo =

Buddhist festival celebrated in Thailand

- Official name: Thai: ตักบาตรเทโว
- Observed by: Thai Buddhists
- Type: Buddhist
- Significance: Celebrates Buddha's symbolic return to earth at the end of Buddhist Lent
- Frequency: Annual
- Related to: Chak Phra, Wan Ok Phansa

Tak Bat Devo (Thai: ตักบาตรเทโว, RTGS: Tak Bat Thewo, pronounced [tàk bàːt tʰēː.wōː]) is a Buddhist festival that is celebrated annually in Central Thailand a day after Wan Ok Phansa, the first day of the 11th waning moon. This is the celebration of Shakyamuni Buddha's return to Earth after delivering a sermon to his dead mother in heaven.

== Etymology ==
"Tak Bat" (Thai: ตักบาตร) means "to present food to a monk or Buddhist priest". "Devo" (Thai: เทโว) is derived from the word "Theworona" (Thai: เทโวโรหณะ) which is "The Buddhas descent from the celestial world".

== The starting point of Tak Bat Thewo ==
In the seventh year after Buddha's intuition, he decided to give a sermon to his dead mother, Sirimahamaya, in Dusit heaven, so he stayed in the heaven for three months from Khao Phansa day to Ok Phansa day. On Ok Phansa day, the 15th day of the 11th waxing moon, Buddha had come back to Earth and made the miracle that all realms (heaven, human, and hell) can see each other while he was going down. The next morning, most citizens made a big "Tak Bat" event as they had not seen Buddha for almost three months. That event was originally called "Tak Bat Theworohana", but as the time passed, it had derived to only "Tak Bat Thewo". To memorize that event, people made it a festival till now.

== The meaning of Theworohana ==
Theworohana means coming down from the heaven of Buddha. It is the part of Buddha's life. The legend said that, when he come back, Indra had made three ladders for him (gold, silver, and crystal). Their heads were put on the top of a mountain and their bases were at the door of Sanggas Nakorn city. When Buddha come down, he used the crystal ladder while the angels used gold ladder and the archangels used silver ladder. That is called Theworohana.

== Special of Tak Bat Thewo ==
Tak Bat Thewo is the special day that they will install the statue of Buddha on a small moving boat and with a monk's alms bowl in the front. There will be some person pulling it slowly while the monks walk in line in the back and the buddish sit on the side and throw the rice balls into that bowl, which is at the front of the statue. Some people will take some sermon in the temple too.

== Tak Bat Thewo in Thailand ==
In Thailand there are countries which do Tak Bat Thewo festival, such as:

1. In Uthai Thani at Wat Sangkat Rattanakhiri, there are about 500 monks walking 449 steps of the staircase down from Sakaekrang hill to receive alms from locals and tourists.
2. In Chon Buri, monks walk in a long line around the Muang district to join Tak Bat Thewo festival.
3. In Buri Ram, about two thousand people joined in merit-making ritual with 199 monks in this festival.
