= Nakhon Sawan province =

Coordinates: 15°41′26″N 100°6′50″E

Nakhon Sawan province จังหวัดนครสวรรค์
- Province
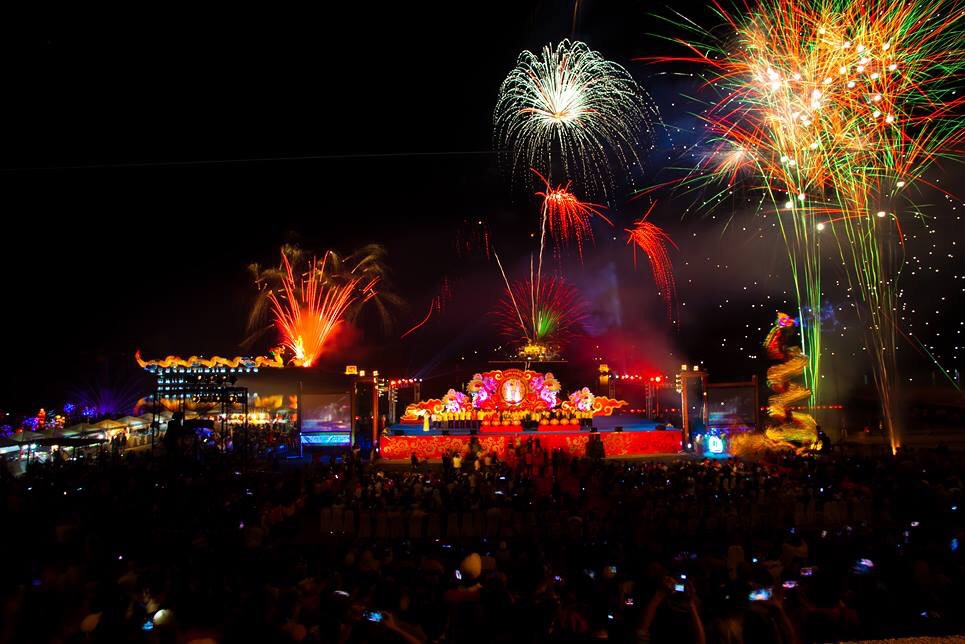
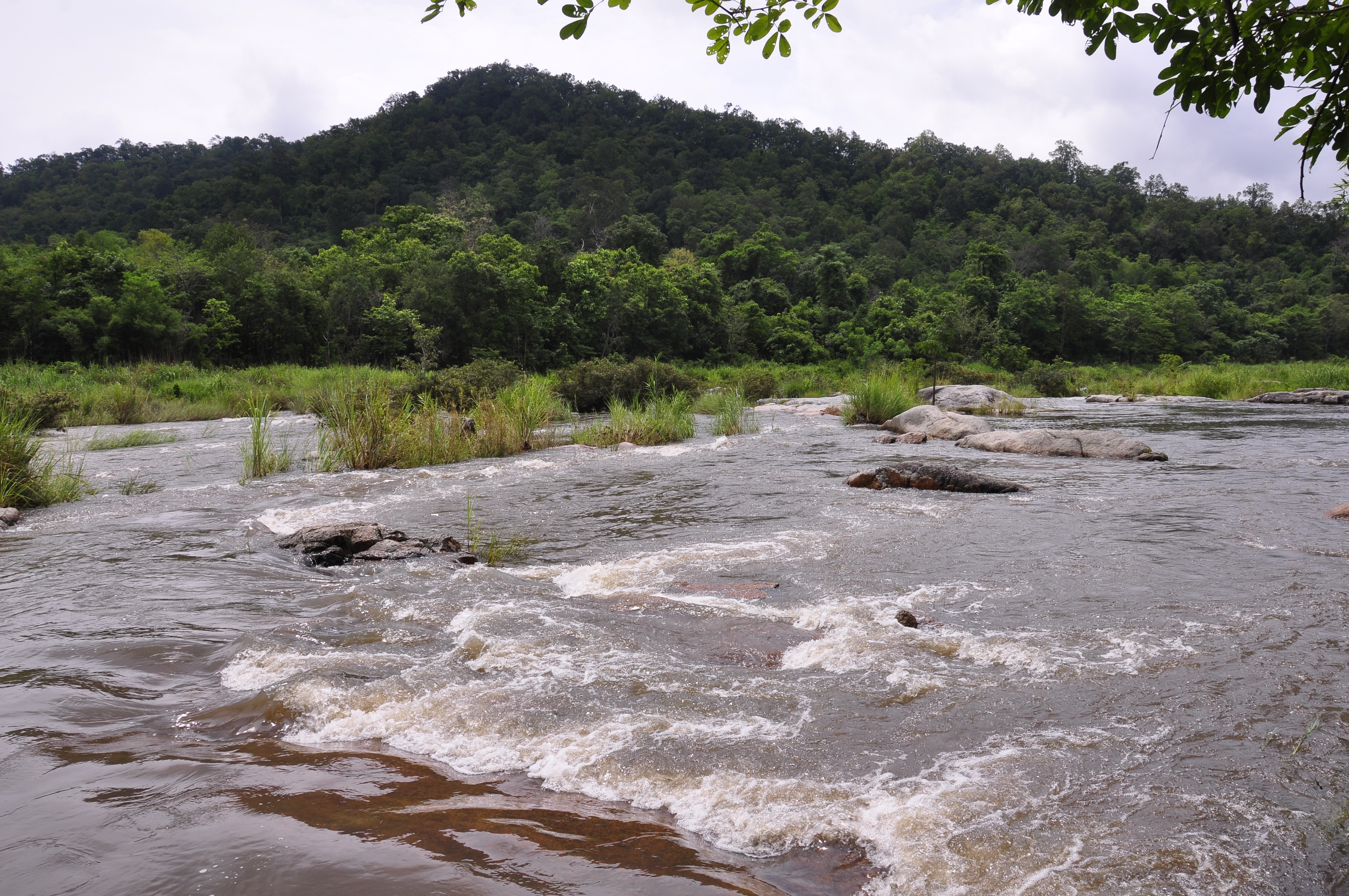
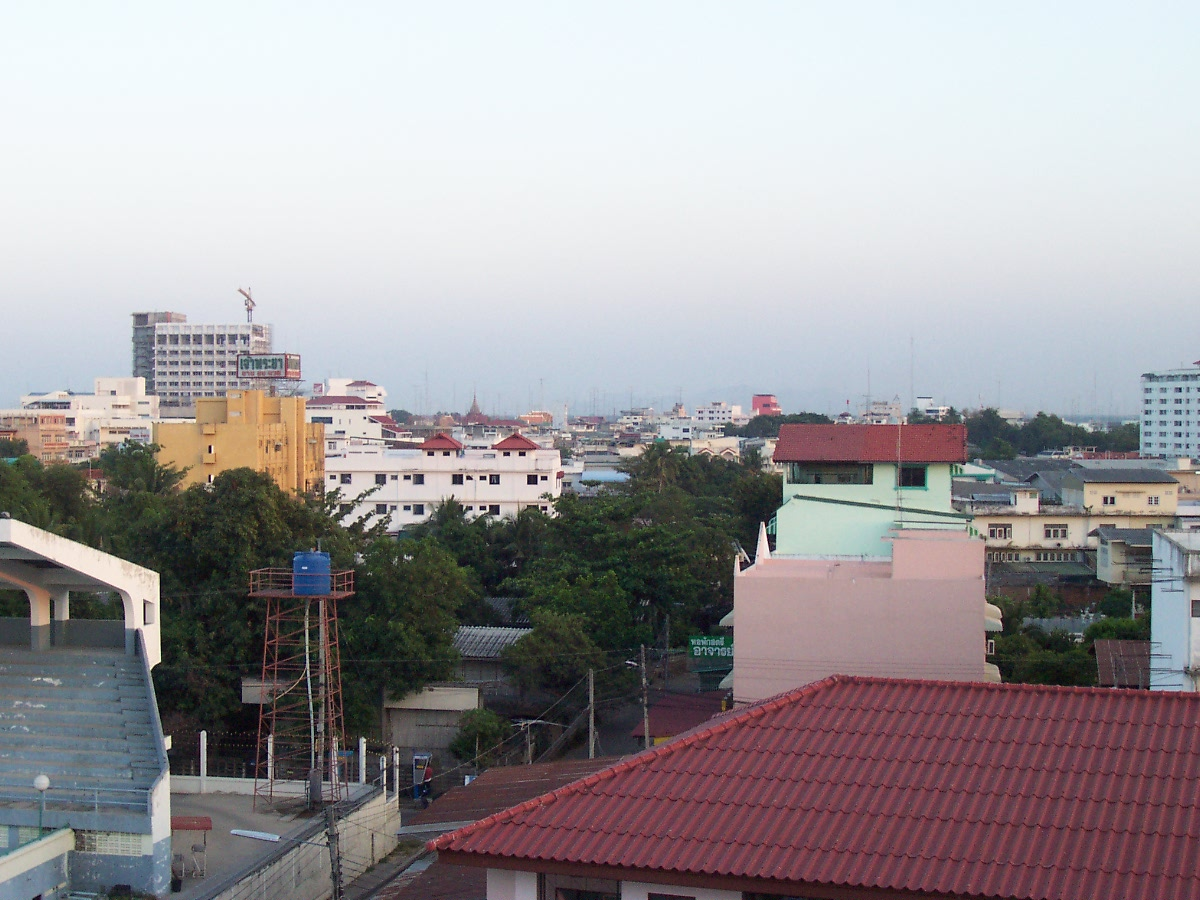
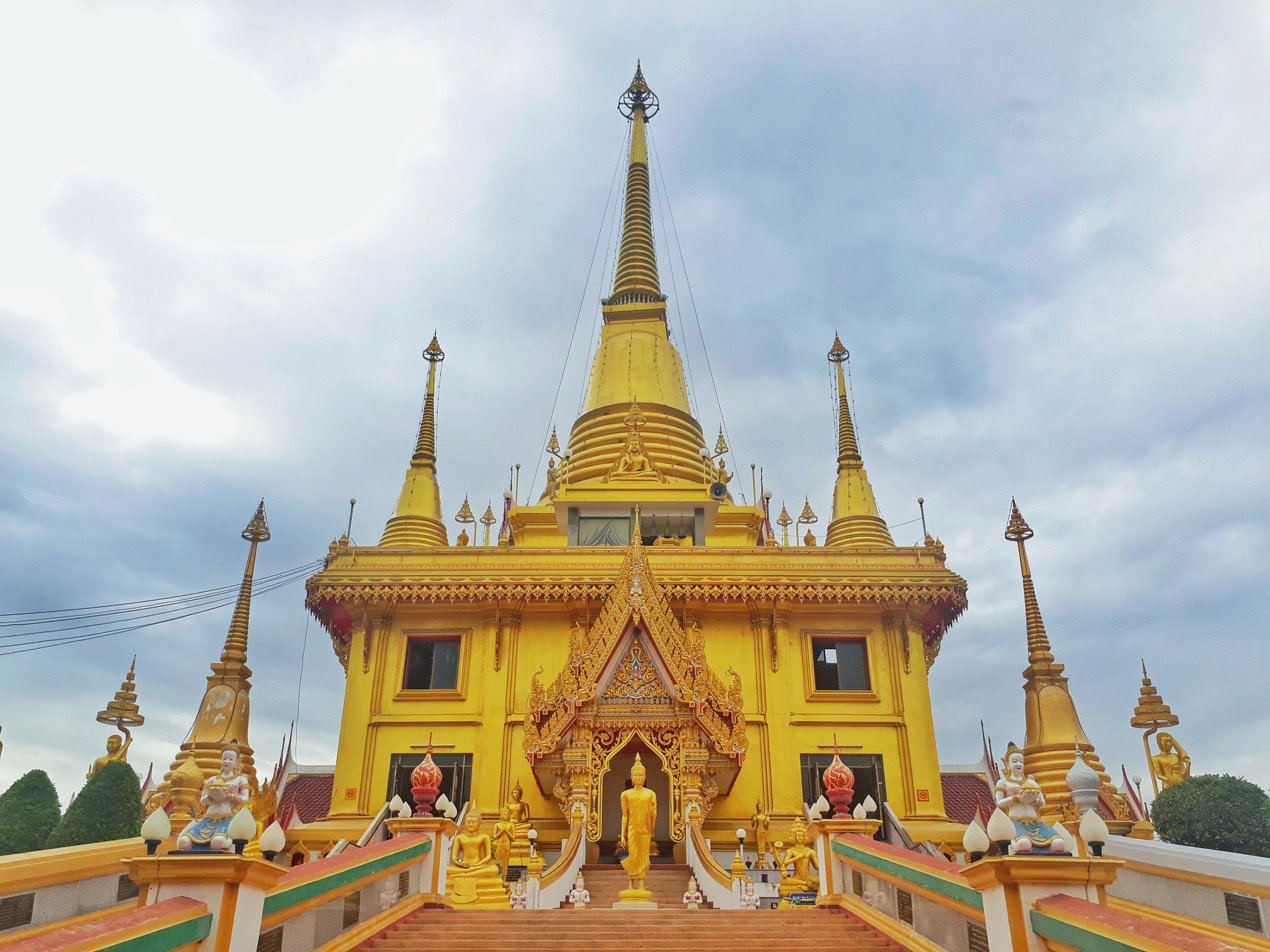
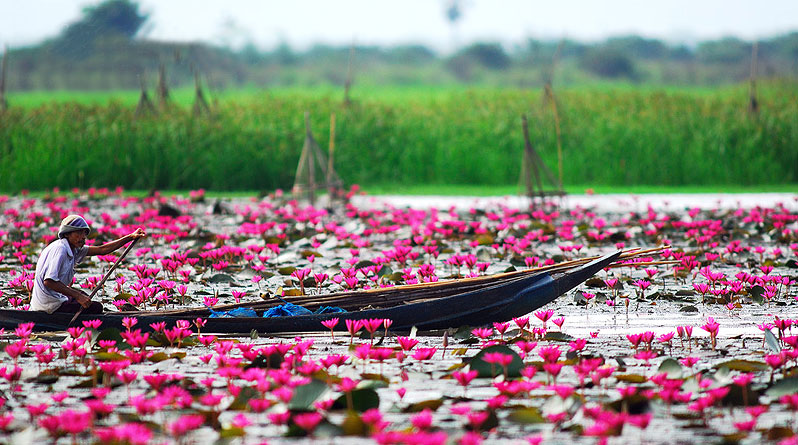
- From top left: 2018 Nakhon Sawan or Pak Nam Pho Chinese New Year Festival, Rapids in Mae Wong National Park, View of Nakhon Sawan city or Pak Nam Pho, Chumamani Chedi, Bueng Boraphet

- Flag Seal
- Nicknames: Pak Nam Pho (Thai: ปากน้ำโพ); Khon Wan (Thai: คอนหวัน); Mueang Si Khwae (Thai: เมืองสี่แคว) (city of four tributaries)
- Mottoes: เมืองสี่แคว แห่มังกร พักผ่อนบึงบอระเพ็ด ปลารสเด็ดปากน้ำโพ ("City of four tributaries. Dragon festival. Rest at Bueng Boraphet. Delicious fish of Pak Nam Pho.")
- Map of Thailand highlighting Nakhon Sawan province
- Country: Thailand
- Capital: Nakhon Sawan city

Government
  - Type: Province and Provincial Administrative Organization
  - Body: Nakhon Sawan Province and Nakhon Sawan Provincial Administrative Organization
  - Governor: Chutiphon Sechang (Indep.)
  - PAO Chief Executive: Somsak Chantaping

Area
  - Total: 9,526 km^{2} (3,678 sq mi)
  - Rank: 20th

Population (2024)
  - Total: ▲1,014,401
  - Rank: 21st
  - Density: 106/km^{2} (270/sq mi)
  - Rank: 47th

Human Achievement Index
  - HAI (2022): 0.6288 "somewhat low" Ranked 57th

GDP
  - Total: baht 107 billion (US$3.7 billion) (2019)
- Time zone: UTC+7 (ICT)
- Postal code: 60xxx
- Calling code: 056
- ISO 3166 code: TH-60
- Website: nakhonsawan.go.th nakhonsawanpao.go.th

Nakhon Sawan province (Thai: จังหวัดนครสวรรค์, pronounced [ná(ʔ).kʰɔ̄ːn sā.wǎn], lit. 'Heavenly City') is one of Thailand's seventy-six provinces (changwat). It lies in lower northern Thailand, neighbouring the provinces of Kamphaeng Phet, Phichit, Phetchabun, Lopburi, Sing Buri, Chai Nat, Uthai Thani, and Tak (clockwise from north).

== Toponymy ==
The word nakhon originates from the Sanskrit word nagara meaning 'city', and the word sawan from Sanskrit svarga meaning 'heaven'. Hence the name of the province literally means 'city of heaven' or 'heavenly city'.

== History ==
Nakhon Sawan province was a city since Dvaravati era. While part of the Sukhothai Kingdom, it was called Mueang Phra Bang, the southern frontier city of Sukhothai. Later within the Ayutthaya kingdom it was an important trade center because of its location at the two major rivers from the north. It also was the common meeting point of Burmese troops before moving to attack Ayutthaya. In the reign of King Taksin the Great, Phra Bang became a Siamese military base to prevent further Burmese attacks.

When King Mongkut signed the Bowring Treaty with Britain the peak period of Nakhon Sawan began, as it became the main rice and teak trading centre. However the opening of the northern railway in 1922, the economic crisis before 1932 revolution, and finally the opening of Dejativongse bridge and Phahonyothin highway in 1950 each decreased the importance of water transportation and thus made Nakhon Sawan less important.

When in 1895 King Chulalongkorn established the monthon as part of the Thesaphiban administrative reform, Nakhon Sawan became capital city of Monthon Nakhon Sawan.

The 4th Infantry Regiment of the 3rd Area Army is based in Nakhon Sawan. It is responsible for defending the northwestern border with Burma, from Mae Hong Son in the north to Kanchanaburi in the south.

== Geography ==
The Ping and Nan rivers merge near the city of Nakhon Sawan to form the Chao Phraya River. Mae Wong National Park, on the border with Khamphaeng Phet province, was created in 1987 to preserve the woodlands of Mae Wong-Mae Poen. The forested area covers 927 km^{2} (358 sq mi) or 9.7 percent of provincial area.

Bueng Boraphet is the largest freshwater wetland in Thailand, in total covering 212 km^{2}. The swamp is directly east of the town Nakhon Sawan and extends into the districts of Tha Tako and Chum Saeng. During the winter months many waterfowl migrate there. Parts of the swamp, covering 106 km^{2}, are protected as a non-hunting area.

There is one national park, along with two other national parks, make up region 12 (Nakhon Sawan) of Thailand's protected areas.

=== National park ===
- Mae Wong National Park, 894 km^{2} (345 sq mi)

with 73,914 visitors in fiscal year 2024.

== Symbols ==
The provincial seal shows a Wiman, a mythological heavenly castle. This relates to the name of the province which translates to 'Heavenly City'.

The provincial tree as well as the flower is Lagerstroemia loudonii (Loudon's crape myrtle). Iridescent shark (Pangasianodon hypophthalmus) is the provincial fish.

== Administrative divisions ==
=== Provincial government ===
The province is divided in 15 districts (amphoe). These are further divided into 130 subdistricts (tambon) and 1,328 villages (muban).

- 1 Mueang Nakhon Sawan
- 2 Krok Phra
- 3 Chum Saeng
- 4 Nong Bua
- 5 Banphot Phisai
- 6 Kao Liao
- 7 Takhli
- 8 Tha Tako
- 9 Phaisali
- 10 Phayuha Khiri
- 11 Lat Yao
- 12 Tak Fa
- 13 Mae Wong
- 14 Mae Poen
- 15 Chum Ta Bong

=== Local government ===
As of 26 November 2019 there are: one Nakhon Sawan Provincial Administration Organisation (ongkan borihan suan changwat) and 21 municipal (thesaban) areas in the province. Nakhon Sawan has city (thesaban nakhon) status and Takhli and Chum Saeng have town (thesaban mueang) status. Further 18 subdistrict municipalities (thesaban tambon). The non-municipal areas are administered by 121 Subdistrict Administrative Organisations - SAO (ongkan borihan suan tambon).

== Transport ==
=== Roads ===
Nakhon Sawan lies on Route 1 (Phahonyothin Road), which runs from Bangkok through Ayutthaya and Saraburi before passing through Nakhon Sawan, then continues through Kamphaeng Phet, Lampang, and Chiang Rai until it reaches the border with Burma at Mae Sai. Route 117 leads north to Phitsanulok, and Route 225 leads east to Chaiyaphum.

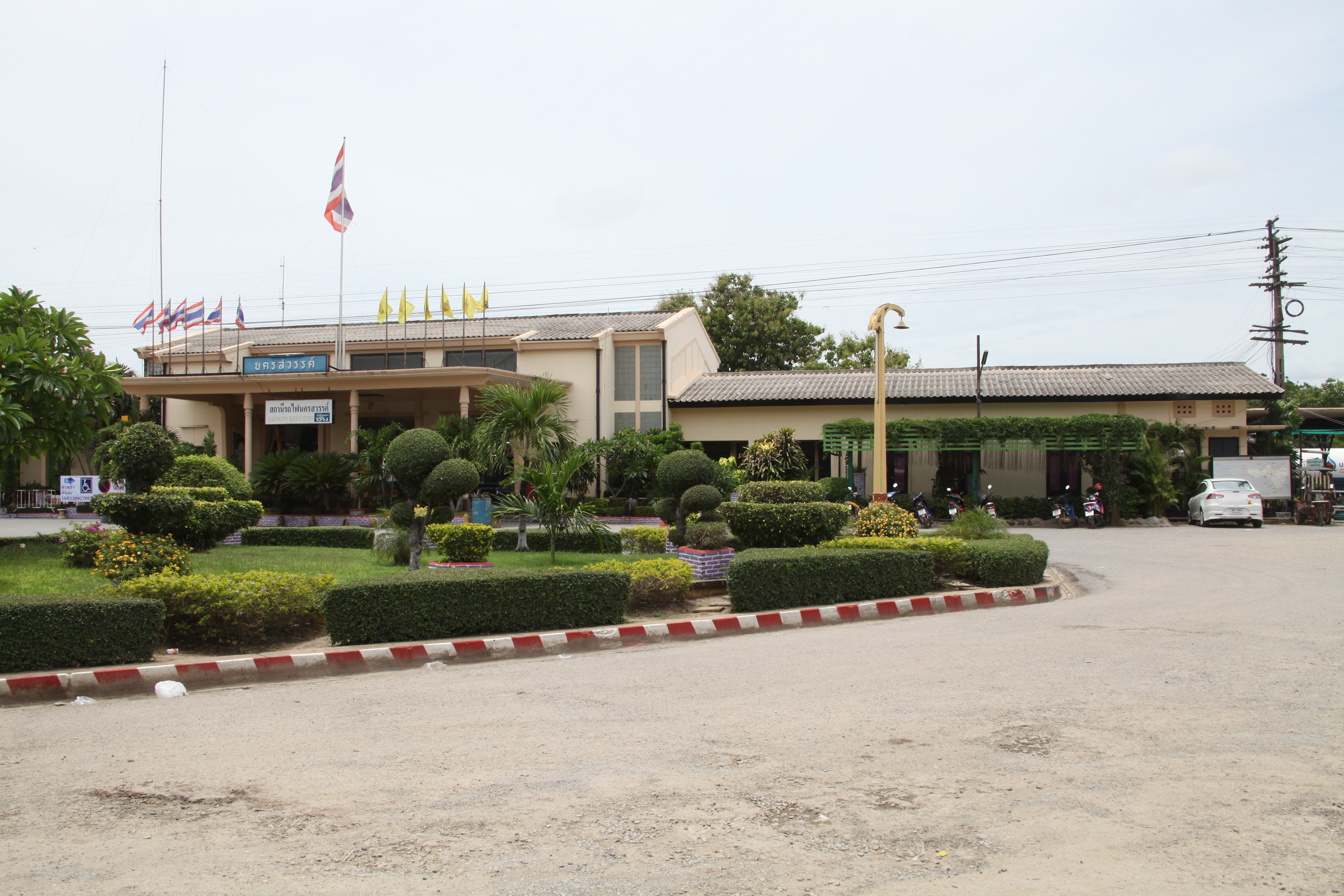
Nakhon Sawan Railway Station

=== Rail ===
Nakhon Sawan has a station, Nakhon Sawan Railway Station, on the Northern Line of the State Railway of Thailand. The station is on the east side of the river, opposite the main city on the west side.

=== Air ===
Nakhon Sawan is served by Nakhon Sawan Airport.

== Health ==
Sawanpracharak Hospital is the main hospital of the province.

== Human achievement index 2022 ==
Health	Education	Employment	Income
18	35	59	28
Housing	Family	Transport	Participation
33	71	65	48
Province Nakhon Sawan, with an HAI 2022 value of 0.6288 is "somewhat low", occupies place 57 in the ranking.

Since 2003, United Nations Development Programme (UNDP) in Thailand has tracked progress on human development at sub-national level using the Human achievement index (HAI), a composite index covering all the eight key areas of human development. National Economic and Social Development Board (NESDB) has taken over this task since 2017.

Rank	Classification
1–13	"High"
14–29	"Somewhat high"
30–45	"Average"
46–61	"Somewhat low"
62–77	"Low"

Map with provinces and HAI 2022 rankings

== Festivals ==
- Pak Nam Pho Chinese New Year Festival: Nakhon Sawan is considered a province with a large population of Thai Chinese descent. The Chinese New Year festival here is therefore a great celebration and held continuously for over 100 years along with attracts tourists from all over, both domestically and internationally.
- Tak Bat Theworohana Festival: The tradition of offering food to monks during the Buddhist Lent Festival (around late October to early November before Loi Krathong) at Wat Khao Kob, a temple on the highest mountaintop of Nakhon Sawan city.

== Attractions ==
- Bueng Boraphet
- Mae Wong National Park
- Wat Koei Chai Nuea (Borommathat)
