= Uthai Thani (disambiguation) =

Uthai Thani may refer to these places in Thailand:

- the town Uthai Thani
- Uthai Thani Province
- Mueang Uthai Thani district
