= Khung Samphao =

Coordinates: 15.308376°N 100.081907°E

Khung Samphao (Thai: คุ้งสำเภา, pronounced [kʰûŋ.sǎm.pʰǎo]) is a tambon (sub-district) of Manorom District, north of Chai Nat Province, central Thailand. It is a location of district office.

== History ==
The name Khung Samphao meaning "bended watercourse of junk", because the area is an area adjacent to the Chao Phraya River. In the past, there were many types of junks and merchant ships docked for trading. Therefore, Khung Samphao was an important inland harbour and a stopover during the boat trip of Chai Nat more than 200 years ago. It was a very lively marketplace and community.

At present, Khung Samphao has been developed to return to life as it was in the past. The walls on the streets are painted in street art style, reflecting the prosperous local society in the past. There is also a large teak junk, more than 70 years old, salvaged from the Chao Phraya River to repair and paint the whole body gold installed on the river as a landmark.

The local pedestrian street is about 1.5 km (0.9 mi) long, starts from the car ferry area up till the Bodhi courtyard in front of the Guan Yu Shrine.

== Geography ==
Khung Samphao is a riverside area where waterways Chao Phraya meet Sakae Krang, forming a river of two colours. It is the confluence between the greenish tone Sakae Krang River and the wider, dark red Chao Phraya River.

Its terrain is a narrow shape along the Chao Phraya River from north to south. The area is characterized by a lowland. The Chao Phraya River is a main watersource for the consumption, therefore, it suffers some deluging in some seasons.

The tambon is bounded by neighbouring areas (from north clockwise): Wat Khok in its district, Hang Nam Sakhon in its district, Thammamun in Mueang Chai Nat, and Tha Sung of Mueang Uthai Thani, Uthai Thani Province (across Chao Phraya River), respectively.

== Transportation ==
Phahonyothin Road (Highway 1) cut through the entire area. In the past, the Chao Phraya River Car Ferry Pier was an important travel route to Uthai Thani in the area near Wat Chantaram (Wat Tha Sung), the temple of highly respected monk Luang Phor Lersi Lingdam.

The Chao Phraya River Car Ferry Pier was discontinued in 2019 due to the completion of the construction of a bridge over the Chao Phraya River.

== Administration ==
Khung Samphao is governed by the Subdistrict-Municipality Khung Samphao (เทศบาลตำบลคุ้งสำเภา).

The area also consists of four administrative villages (muban).

== Economy ==
The occupation of the inhabitants is equal to the proportion of civil service, trade, labour and farmers. The average per capita income is more than 20,000 baht.

== Places ==
- Khung Samphao Old Market
- Guan Yu Shrine
- Wat Pikul Ngam Temple and Macaque Area
- Bridge Over Chao Phraya River (shares with Tha Sung of Uthai Thani)
