= Nong Mamong district =

Nong Mamong หนองมะโมง
- District
- District location in Chai Nat province
- Coordinates: 15°16′36″N 99°52′0″E
- Country: Thailand
- Province: Chai Nat
- Seat: Nong Mamong
- District established: 1996

Area
  - Total: 291.0 km^{2} (112.4 sq mi)

Population (2008)
  - Total: 19,330
  - Density: 67.1/km^{2} (174/sq mi)
- Time zone: UTC+7 (ICT)
- Postal code: 17100
- Geocode: 1807

Nong Mamong (Thai: หนองมะโมง) is the northwesternmost district (amphoe) of Chai Nat province, central Thailand.

== Geography ==
Neighboring districts are (from the east clockwise) Wat Sing and Hankha of Chainat Province, Ban Rai, Huai Khot, Nong Chang and Nong Khayang of Uthai Thani province.

== History ==
The minor district (king amphoe) was established on 15 July 1996 with four tambons split off from Wat Sing district.

On 15 May 2007, all 81 minor districts were upgraded to full districts. With publication in the Royal Gazette on 24 August the upgrade became official.

== Administration ==
The district is divided into four sub-districts (tambons), which are further subdivided into 42 villages (mubans). There are no municipal (thesaban) areas, and a further four tambon administrative organizations (TAO).

No.	Name	Thai	Pop.
1.	Nong Mamong	หนองมะโมง	12	5,179
2.	Wang Takhian	วังตะเคียน	14	6,596
3.	Saphan Hin	สะพานหิน	10	5,130
4.	Kut Chok	กุดจอก	6	2,425
