= Manorom district =

Manorom มโนรมย์
- District
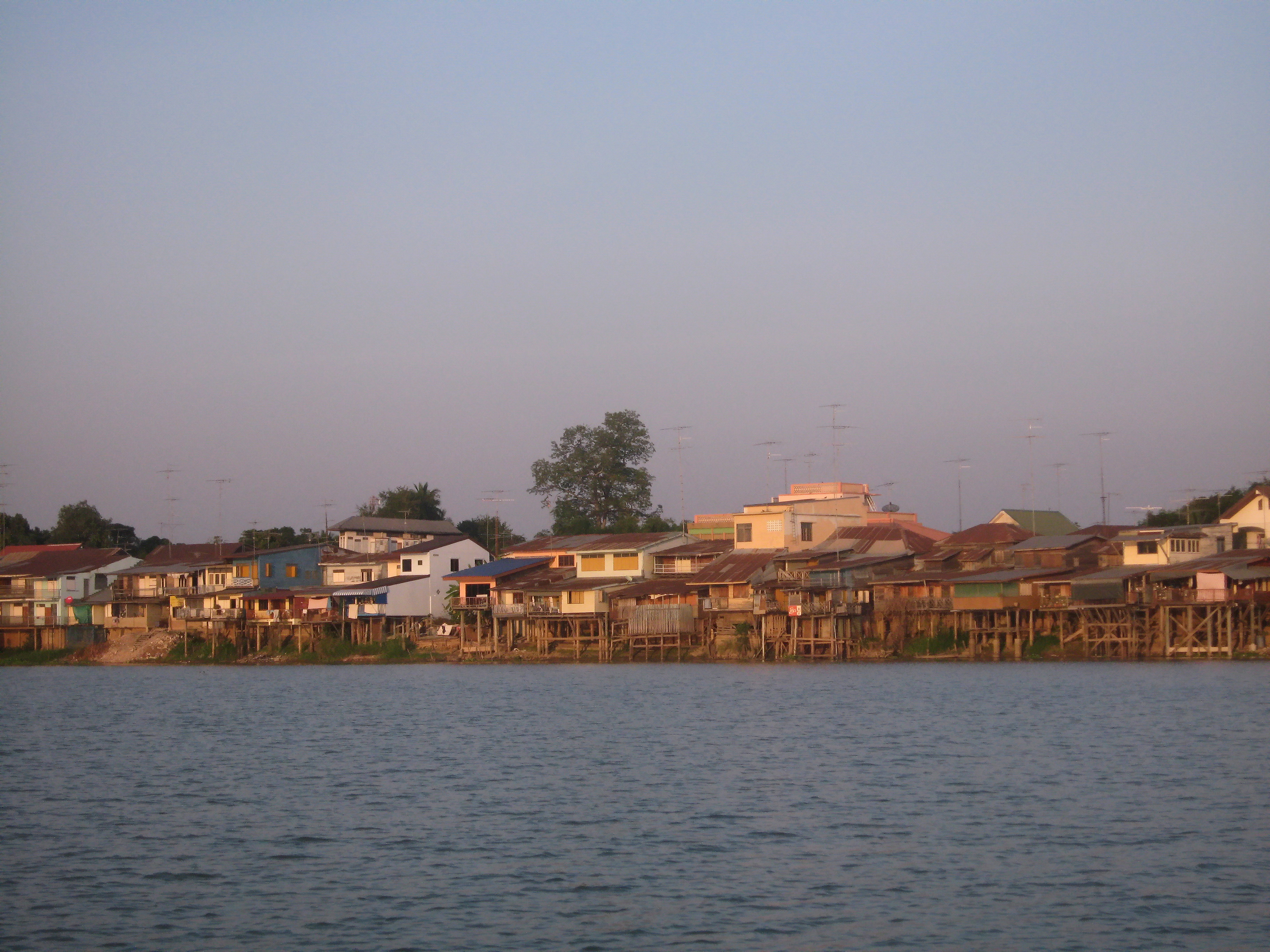
- Chao Phraya River flows through Manorom community

- District location in Chai Nat province
- Coordinates: 15°18′34″N 100°5′2″E
- Country: Thailand
- Province: Chai Nat
- Seat: Khung Samphao

Area
  - Total: 225.644 km^{2} (87.122 sq mi)

Population (2014)
  - Total: 32,847
  - Density: 147.9/km^{2} (383/sq mi)
- Time zone: UTC+7 (ICT)
- Postal code: 17110
- Geocode: 1802

Manorom (Thai: มโนรมย์, pronounced [mā.nōː.rōm]) is a district (amphoe) in the northeastern part of Chai Nat province, central Thailand.

== Geography ==
Neighboring districts are (from the south clockwise) Mueang Chainat and Wat Sing of Chainat Province; Mueang Uthai Thani of Uthai Thani province; Phayuha Khiri and Takhli of Nakhon Sawan province.

== History ==
Two moated ancient towns with ramparts stand in the district, Muang Nakhon Noi and U-Ta Pao, the second of them on the edge of the Hang Nam Sakorn waterway. In October 1988 workers in a field in Village No. 5 of Hang Nam Sakhon subdistrict, 1.7 km south-west of Muang Nakhon Noi and 1.8 km north-east of U-Ta Pao, uncovered a broken stone wheel of the law and a fragment of an octagonal pillar, both carrying Pāli inscriptions. Excavation in 1990 by Charuk Wilaikaeo exposed a circular brick platform in two layers, 7 metres across and 37 centimetres high. Eng Jin Ooi and Peter Skilling read it as the base for a pillar carrying a wheel of about 180 centimetres. Spoke fragments, broken pieces of the wheel, parts of the mouth, nose and ear of a deer statue and about ten pot and basin sherds lay one to four metres from it, between 20 and 140 centimetres below the surface.

Two lion sculptures in the Dvāravatī style were found among the fragments. A stone block recovered with them is thought to be part of the bracket that held the wheel upright. Ooi and Skilling reconstruct the monument as the brick base carrying the octagonal pillar, the bracket and the wheel, with the lions set below it. The objects have been in the Chainatmuni National Museum since 2018. Dvāravatī material has been recovered west, east and south of U-Ta Pao, and iron slag and kilns on the northern side of that town indicate activity from the prehistoric period.

== Administration ==
=== Central ===
Manorom is divided into seven sub-districts (tambons), which are further subdivided into 40 administrative villages (mubans).

| No. | Name | Thai | Villages | Pop. |
|---|---|---|---|---|
| 1. | Khung Samphao | คุ้งสำเภา | 4 | 5,719 |
| 2. | Wat Khok | วัดโคก | 5 | 3,817 |
| 3. | Sila Dan | ศิลาดาน | 6 | 3,509 |
| 4. | Tha Chanuan | ท่าฉนวน | 10 | 6,796 |
| 5. | Hang Nam Sakhon | หางน้ำสาคร | 5 | 5,743 |
| 6. | Rai Phatthana | ไร่พัฒนา | 5 | 3,830 |
| 7. | U Taphao | อู่ตะเภา | 5 | 3,433 |

=== Local ===
There are four sub-district municipalities (thesaban tambon) in the district:

- Khung Samphao (Thai: เทศบาลตำบลคุ้งสำเภา) consisting of parts of sub-district Khung Samphao.
- Hang Nam Sakhon (Thai: เทศบาลตำบลหางน้ำสาคร) consisting of sub-district Hang Nam Sakhon and parts of sub-district U Taphao.
- Manorom (Thai: เทศบาลตำบลมโนรมย์) consisting of parts of sub-district Khung Samphao.
- Sila Dan (Thai: เทศบาลตำบลศิลาดาน) consisting of sub-district Sila Dan.

There are four sub-district administrative organizations (SAO) in the district:

- Wat Khok (Thai: องค์การบริหารส่วนตำบลวัดโคก) consisting of sub-district Wat Khok.
- Tha Chanuan (Thai: องค์การบริหารส่วนตำบลท่าฉนวน) consisting of sub-district Tha Chanuan.
- Rai Phatthana (Thai: องค์การบริหารส่วนตำบลไร่พัฒนา) consisting of sub-district Rai Phatthana.
- U Taphao (Thai: องค์การบริหารส่วนตำบลอู่ตะเภา) consisting of parts of sub-district U Taphao.
