= Wat Chantharam =

Buddhist temple in Thailand

- Wat Tha Sung
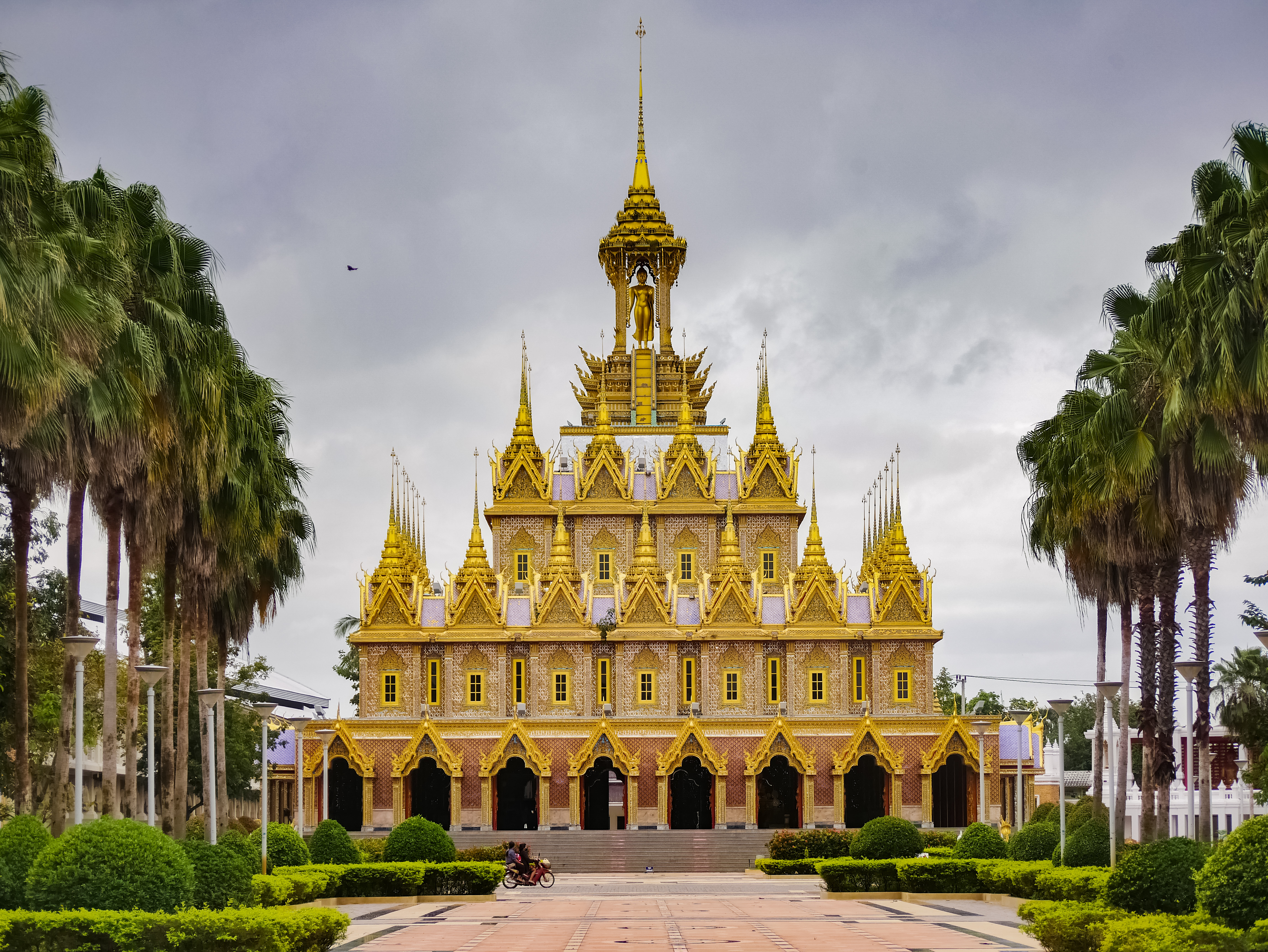
- The Golden Castle

- Location within Thailand

Religion
- Affiliation: Buddhism
- Sect: Theravāda Mahā Nikāya
- Status: Civil temple

Location
- Location: Mu 1 Nam Suem, Uthai Thani, Uthai Thani 61000
- Country: Thailand
- Interactive map of Wat Chantharam
- Coordinates: 15.327968°N 100.071219°E

Architecture
- Completed: 1928 (officially)

Website
- http://www.watthasung.com/home.php

Wat Chantharam (วัดจันทาราม), also commonly known as Wat Tha Sung (วัดท่าซุง) or Wat Luang Pho Ruesi Ling Dam, is an ancient Buddhist temple (wat) in Mueang Uthai Thani District, Uthai Thani Province, Thailand. The temple belongs to the Mahanikaya order and covers an area of 510 rai, divided into 280 rai of temple grounds and 230 rai of forest land.

== History ==
The temple was originally built during the Ayutthaya period, around the reign of King Narai. At that time, logs were often transported along the Sakae Krang River in front of the temple, leading locals to call it Wat Tha Sung — tha (ท่า) meaning "pier" and sung (ซุง) meaning "log" in Thai.

Wat Chantaram (Wat Tha Sung) was officially established in 1928 (B.E. 2471) and was granted Visungkhamsima (ordination boundary) on October 25, 1939 (B.E. 2482), covering an area 40 meters wide and 80 meters long.

The temple was named after its early abbot, Luang Pho Chan, a former soldier during the reign of King Narai. After returning from the Chiang Mai campaign and being unable to find his wife, he ordained at the temple and later became its abbot.

In 1789 (B.E. 2332), Luang Pho Yai came on pilgrimage and stayed in a forest hut near Tha Sung village. The villagers, impressed by his virtue and teachings, invited him to reside permanently at the temple.

By the mid-20th century, the temple had fallen into disrepair. In 1968, Luang Phor Ruesi Lingdam (Phra Ratchaprommayan, Wira Thavaro) became abbot and began extensive renovations, developing the temple into one of the most renowned meditation centers in Thailand. Luang Phor Ruesi Lingdam was widely respected for his mastery of Vipassana practice.

== Temple Buildings ==
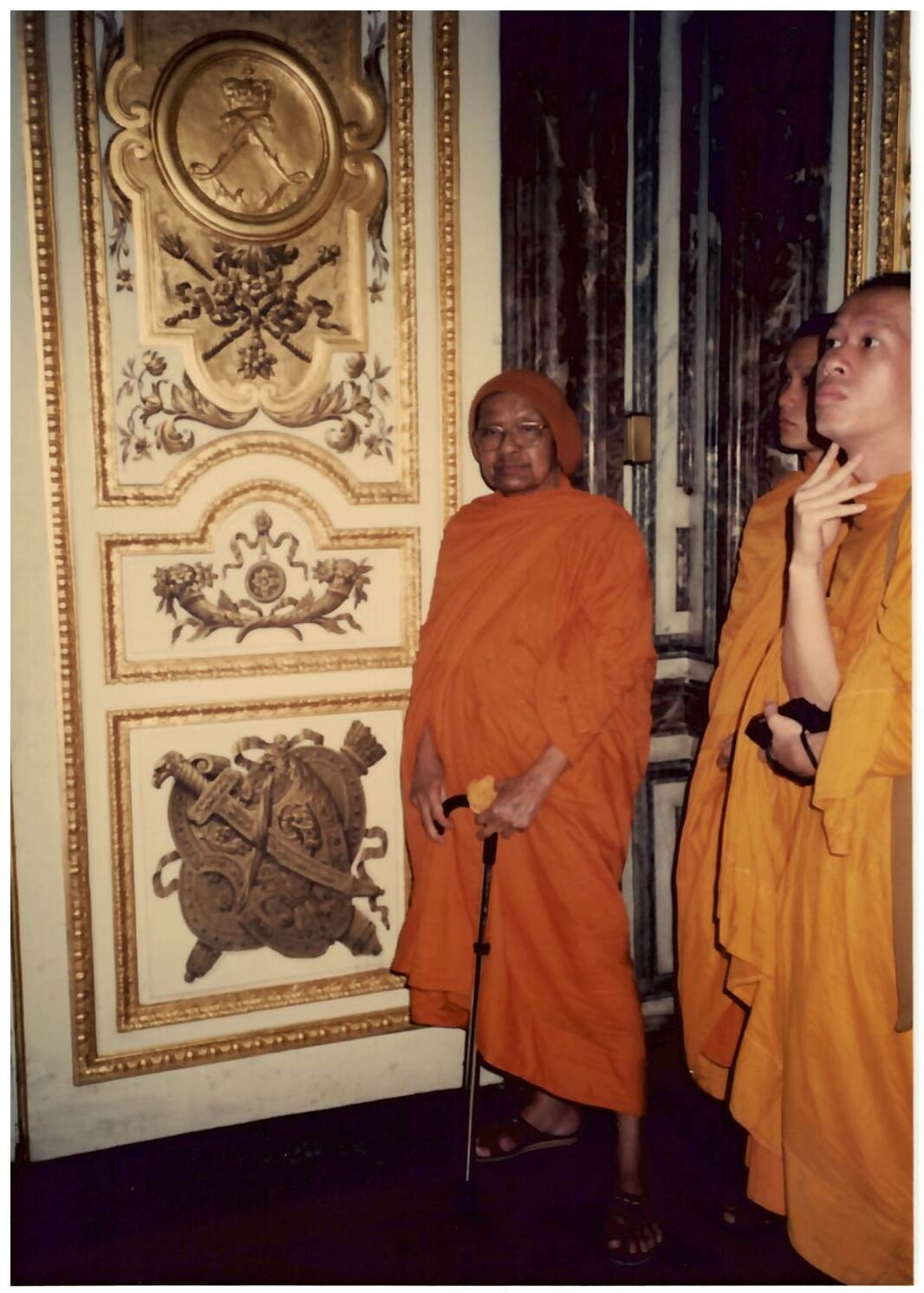
Phra Ratchaprommayan, former abbot

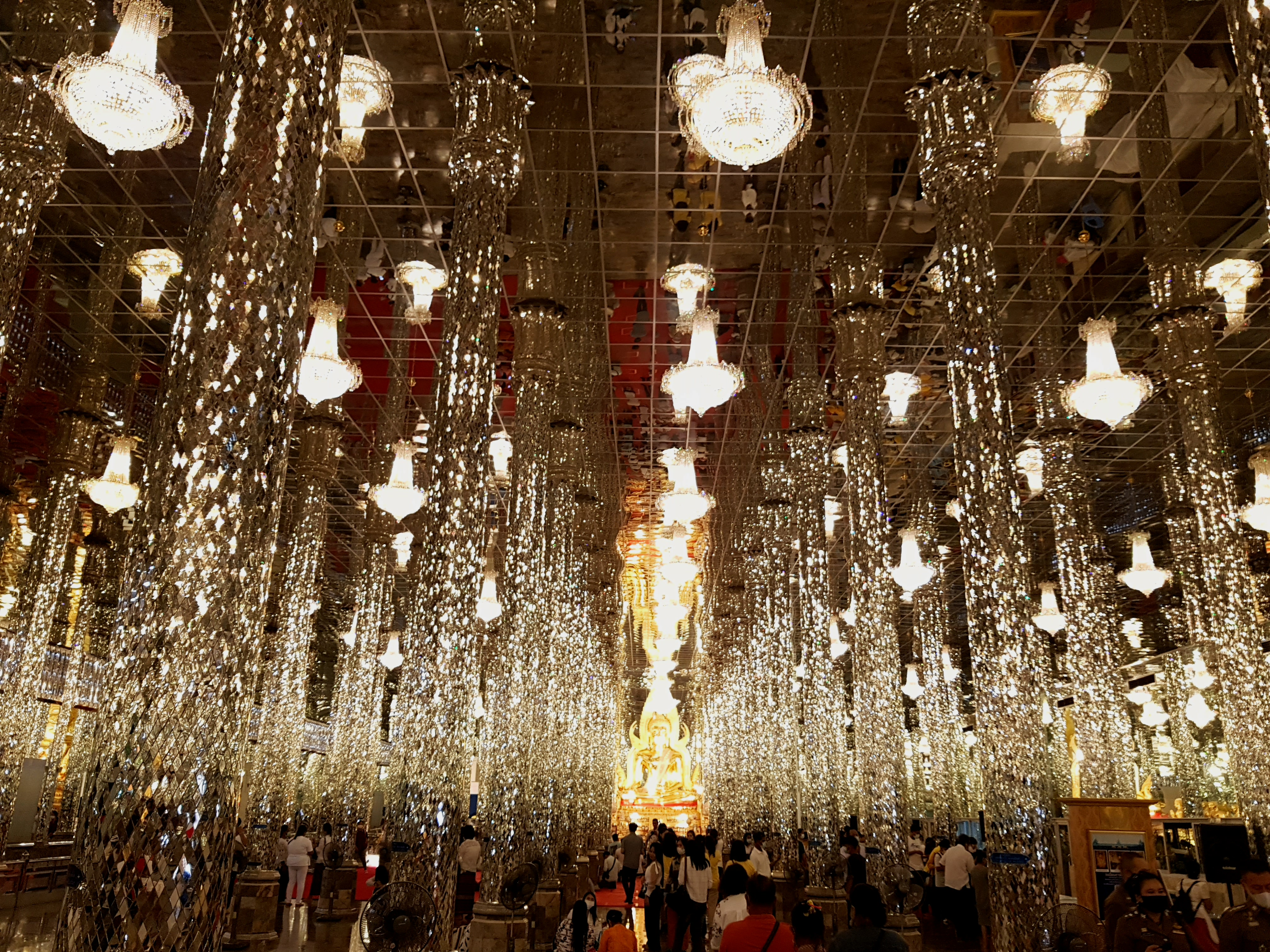
Wihan Kaew 100 Meter

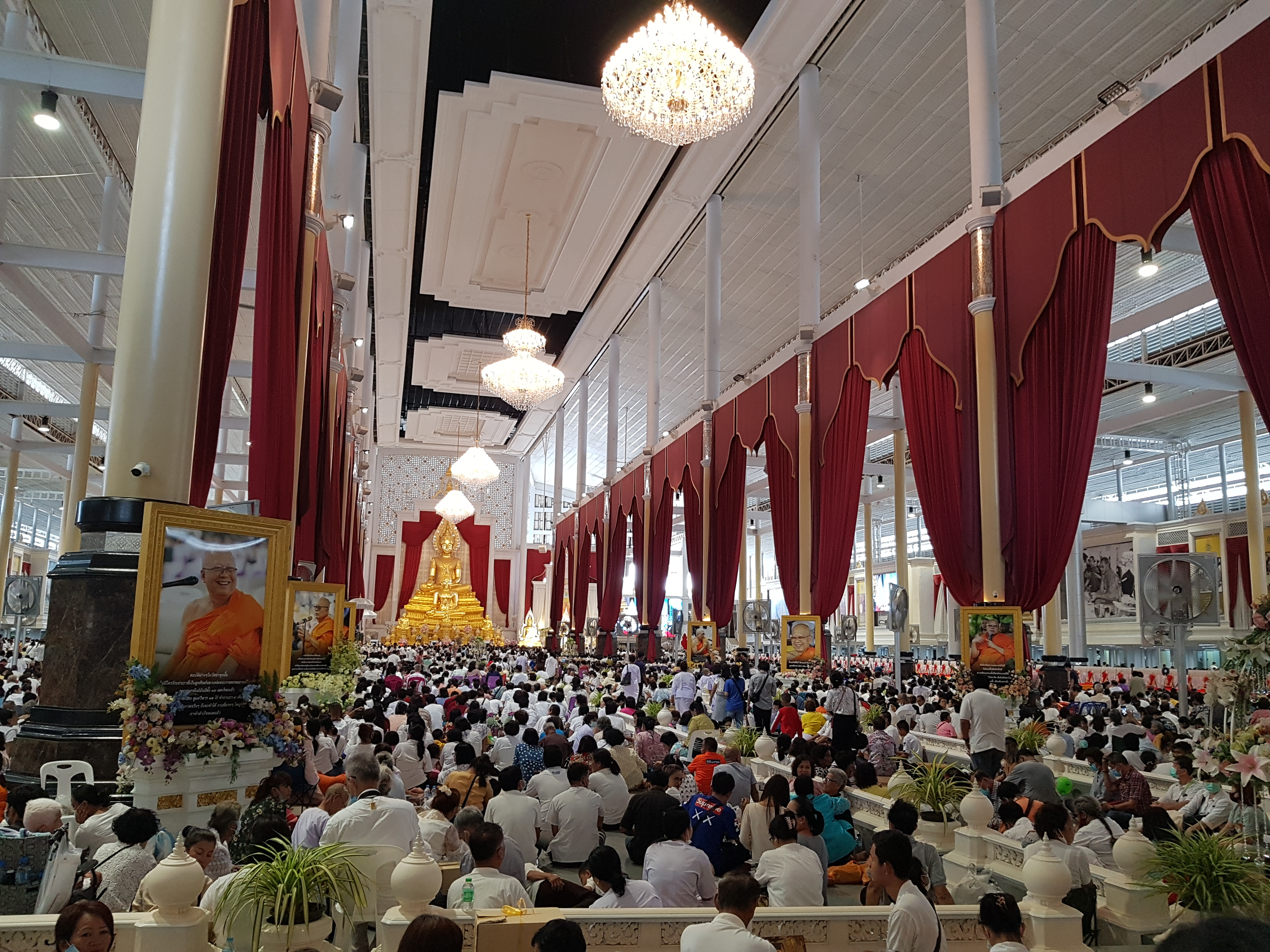
Maha Vihara 100 Pi Phra Ratchaprommayan (Sala 12 Rai)

The main structures within the temple include the ordination hall (ubosot), sermon hall, crematorium, and numerous vihara and pavilions.

- The ordination hall measures 4.5 m × 20.5 m.
- The sermon hall (built 1981, restored 2006) measures 18 m × 21 m.
- The crematorium measures 4.5 m × 10.5 m.

Other significant structures include:

- The 100-Meter Great Vihara (Wihan Kaew 100 Meter) — a 100 m (328.1 ft)-long glass vihara lined with mirrors and chandeliers, housing a replica of the Phra Phuttha Chinnarat image.
- The Golden Palace (Prasat Thong) — entirely decorated in gold, later officially renamed “Prasat Thong Kanchanaphisek” by the Bureau of the Royal Household.
- The Vihara of Luang Phor Saksit, Pavilion of the 12 Zodiac Buddha Footprints, Phra Chulamani Chedi, Pavilion of the Four Great Kings, and six royal monuments.

The temple also houses Phra Suthammayan Thera Wittaya School, which provides education for novice monks and local students.

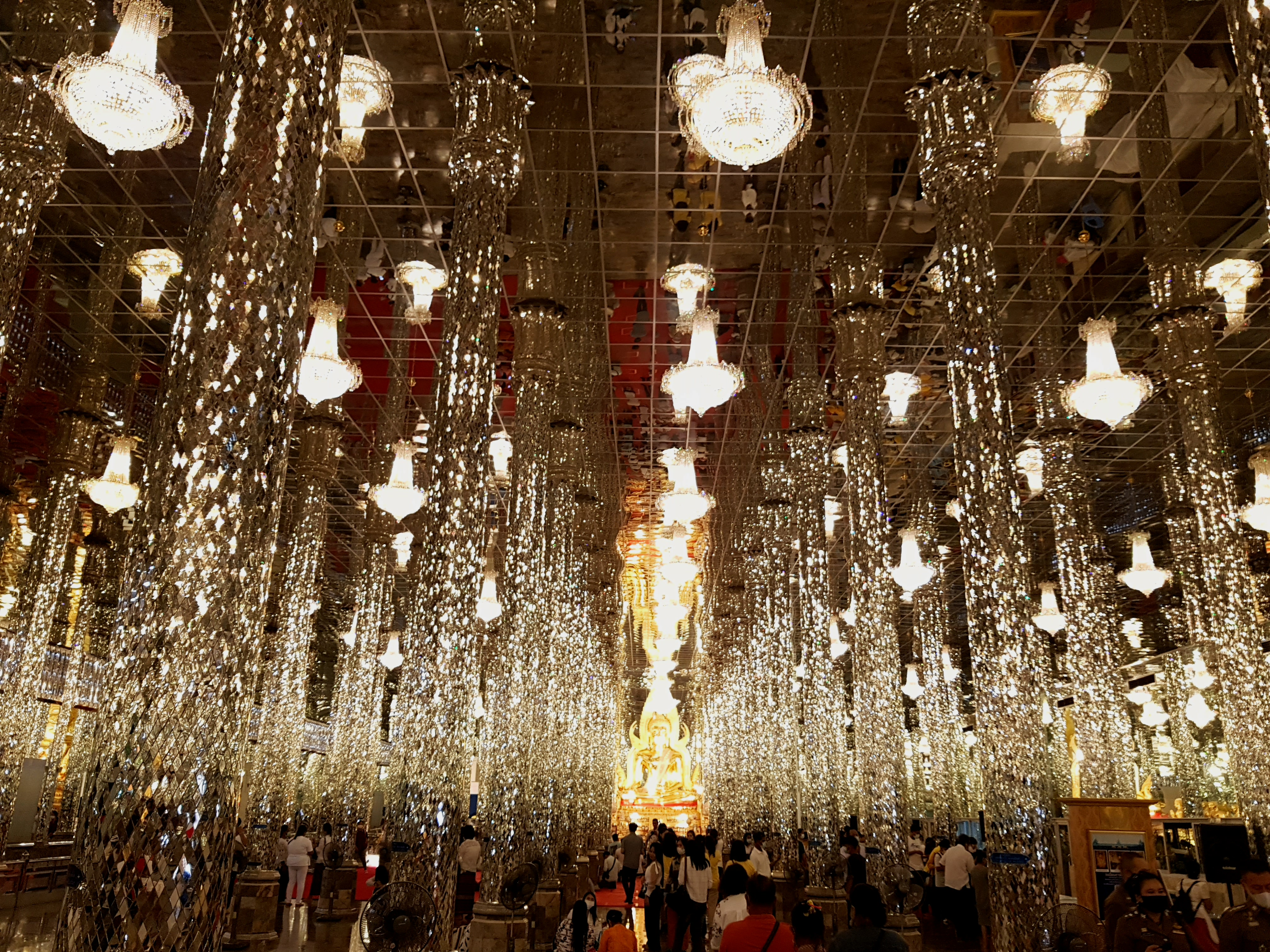
Inside the Crystal Mandapa

== Highlights ==
Visitors often come to admire the Crystal Mandapa, Golden Castle, and Vihara of Luang Phor Saksit, among others. The temple’s riverfront area is a Fish Sanctuary, home to large numbers of iridescent shark and other species, where visitors can feed fish and relax.

== Location ==
Wat Tha Sung is located in the southwest part of Mueang Uthai Thani District on the banks of the Sakae Krang River, near its confluence with the Chao Phraya River, forming the boundary between Uthai Thani and Chai Nat.

== List of Abbots ==
- Luang Pho Chan
- Luang Pho Yai (1789)
- Luang Pho Seng (Luang Pho Khanom Chin)
- Luang Pho Leng
- Phra Ajahn Arun Aruṇo (disrobed)
- Luang Phor Ruesi Lingdam (1968–1992)
- Phra Ratchaphawanakoson W. (Anan Phutthayano) (1993–2018)
- Phra Phawanawachirophas W. (Somnuek Sutammatthirasaddho) (2018–present)

== Gallery ==
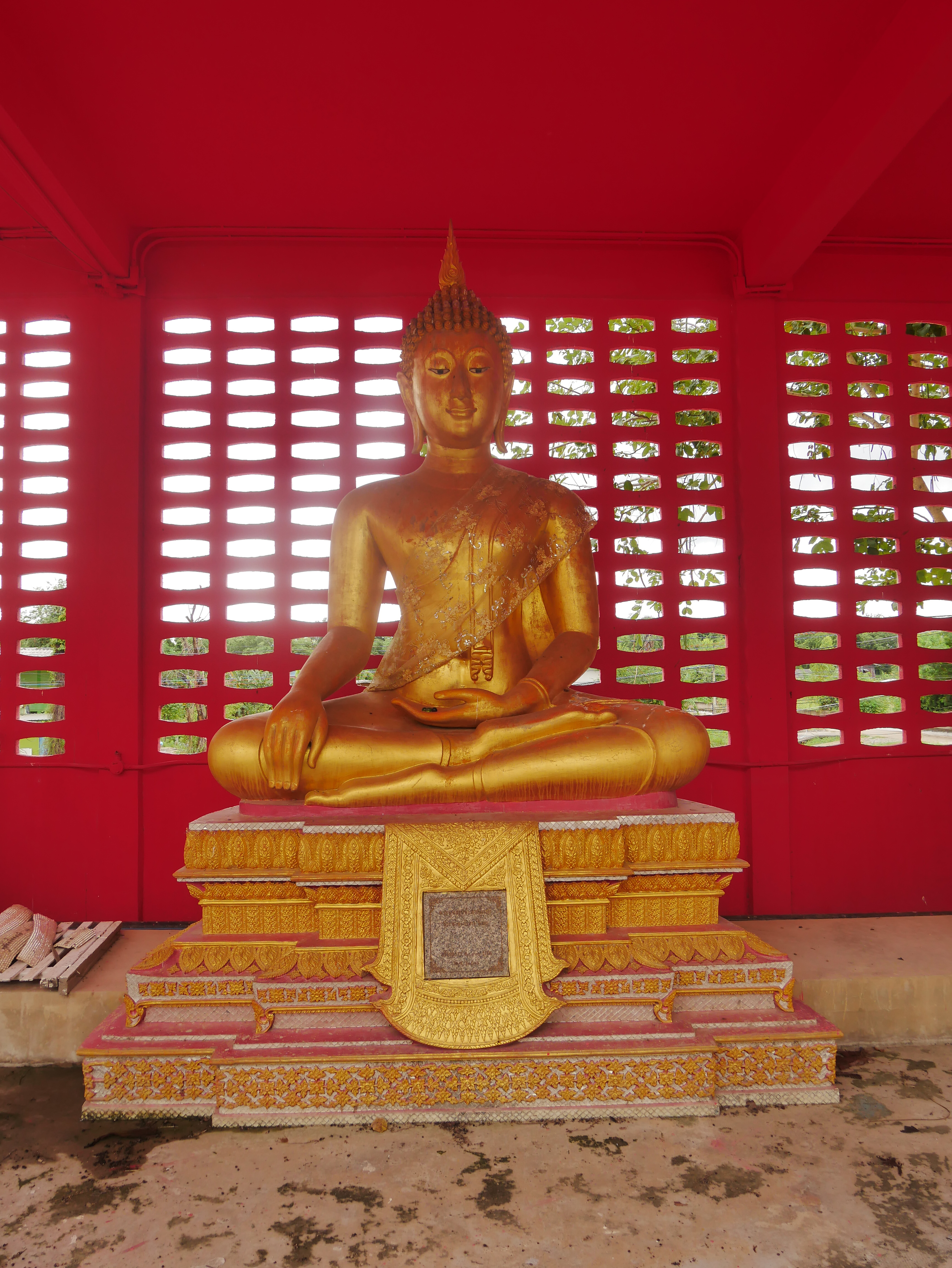
Vihara of Phra Samana Kodom

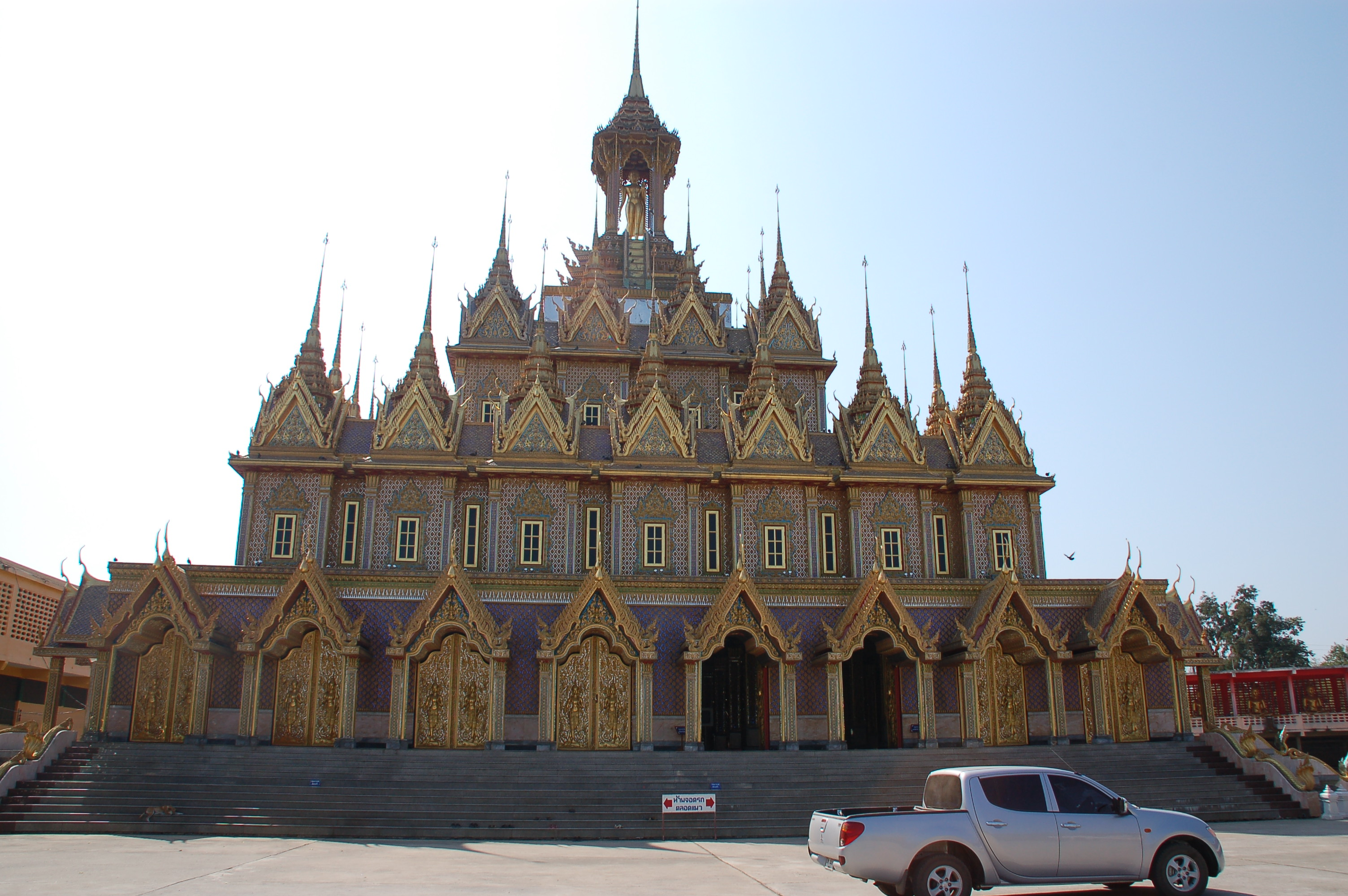
Golden Palace within the temple

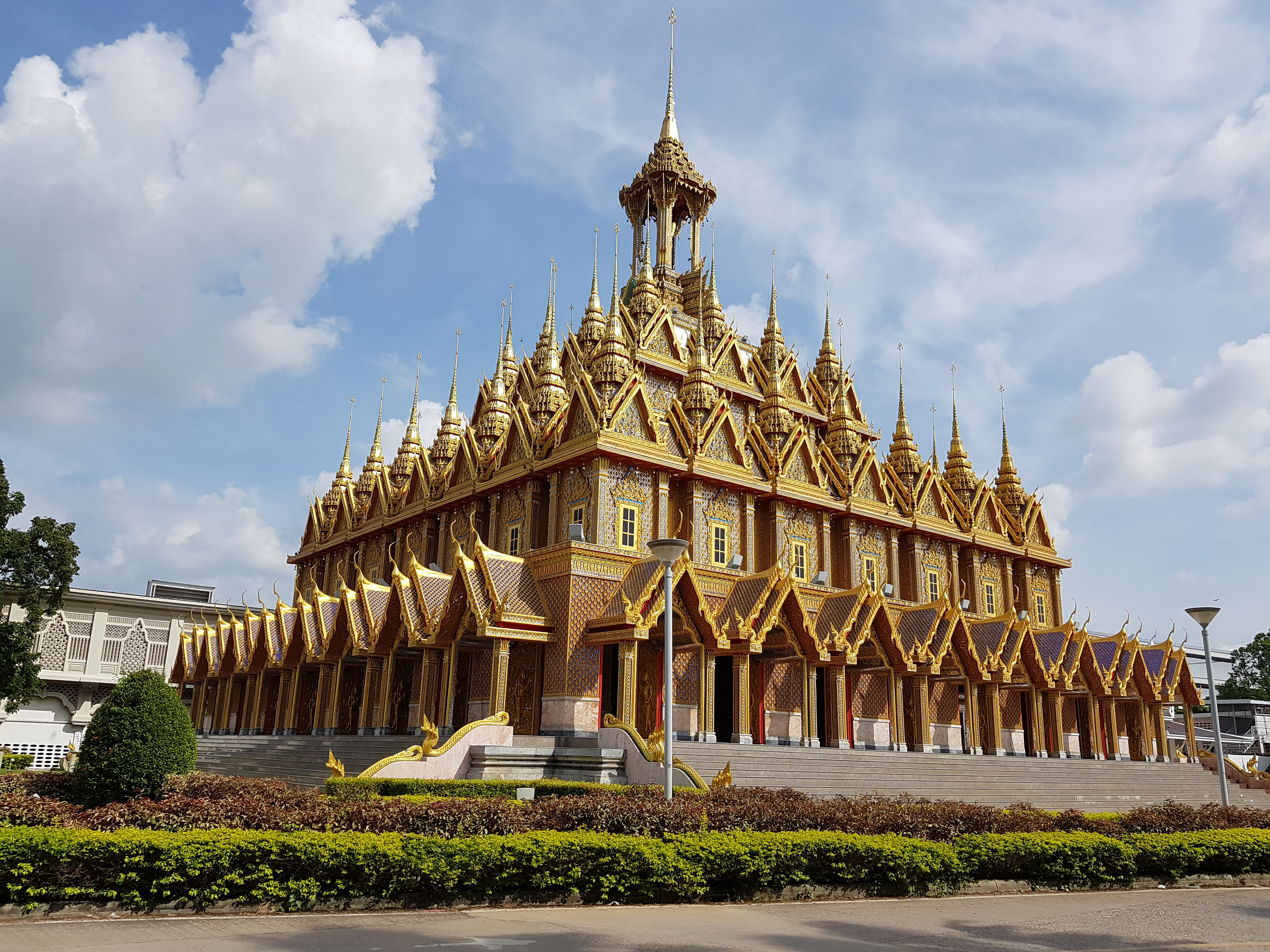
Golden Palace

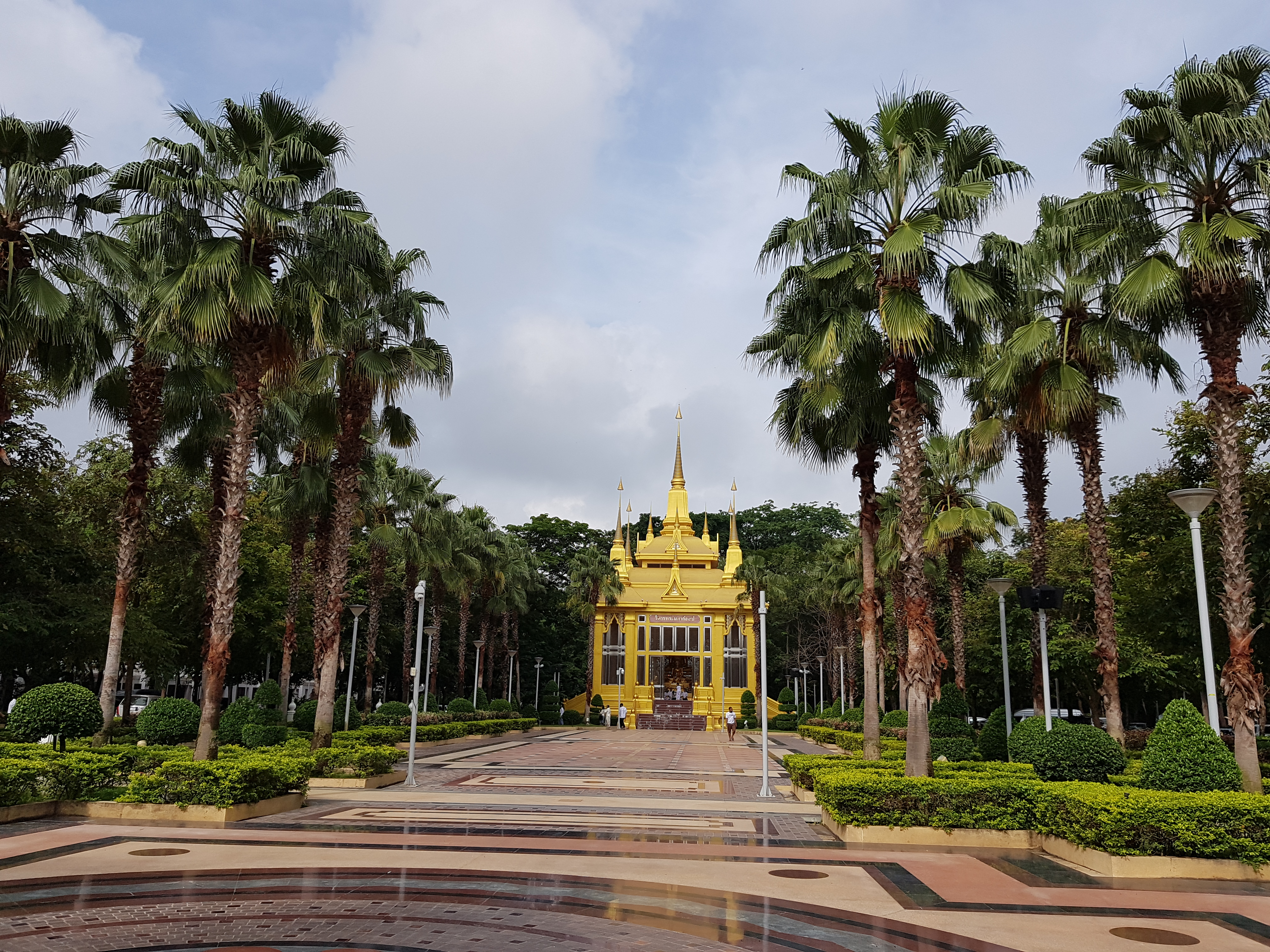
Vihara of Phra Maha Kassapa

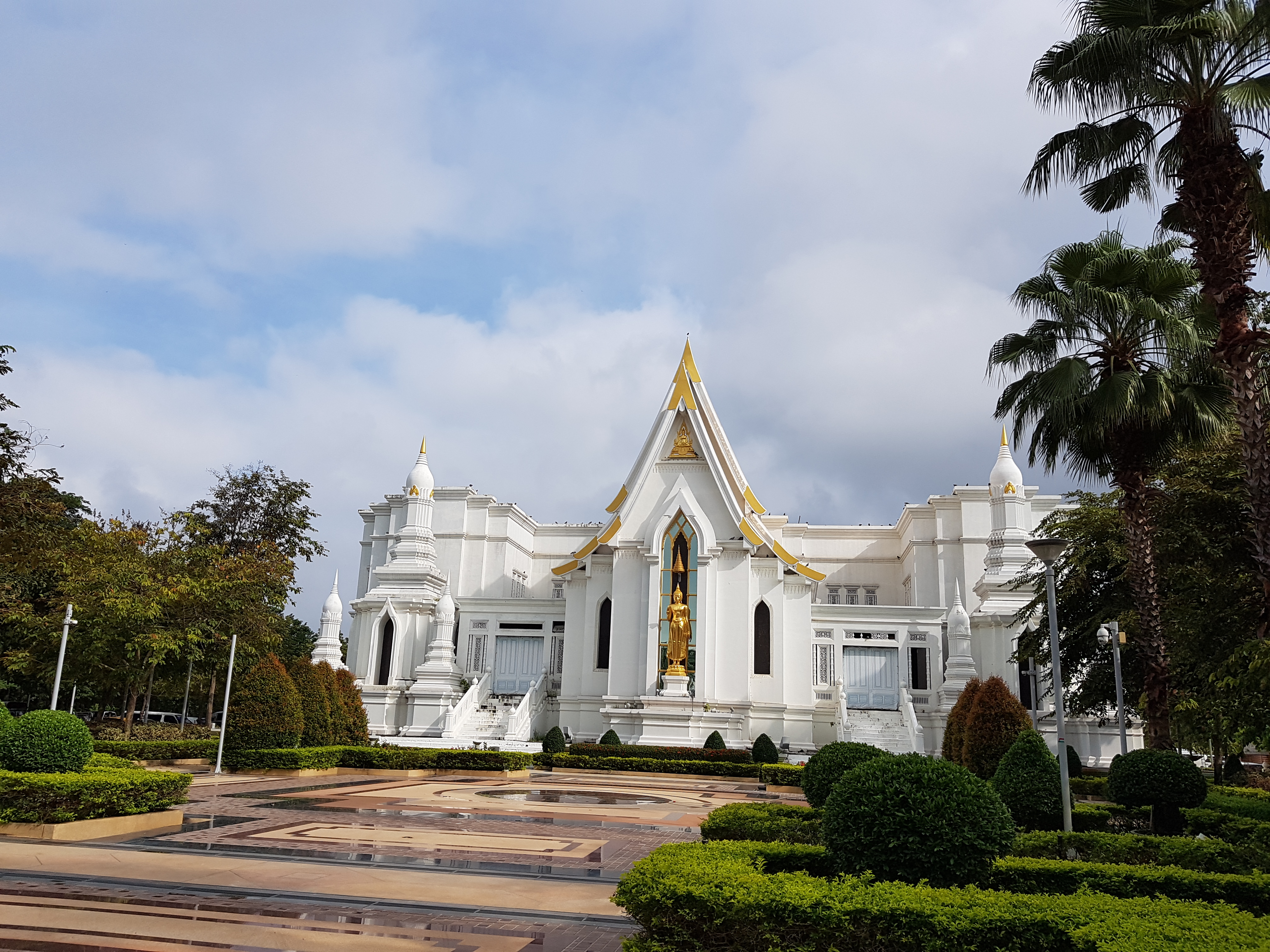
Som Bat Pho Hai Museum Building

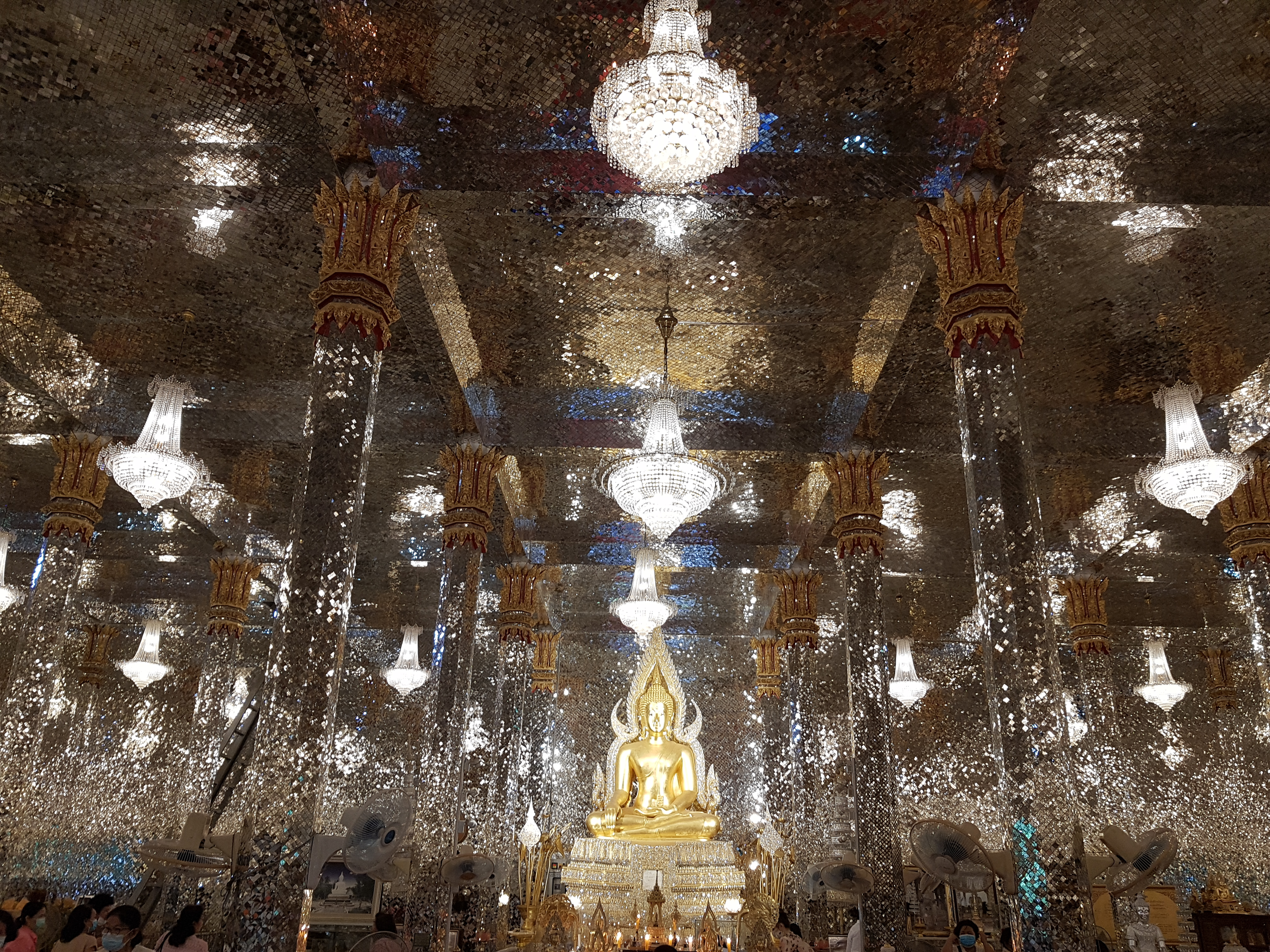
Vihara of Phra Somdet Ong Pathom

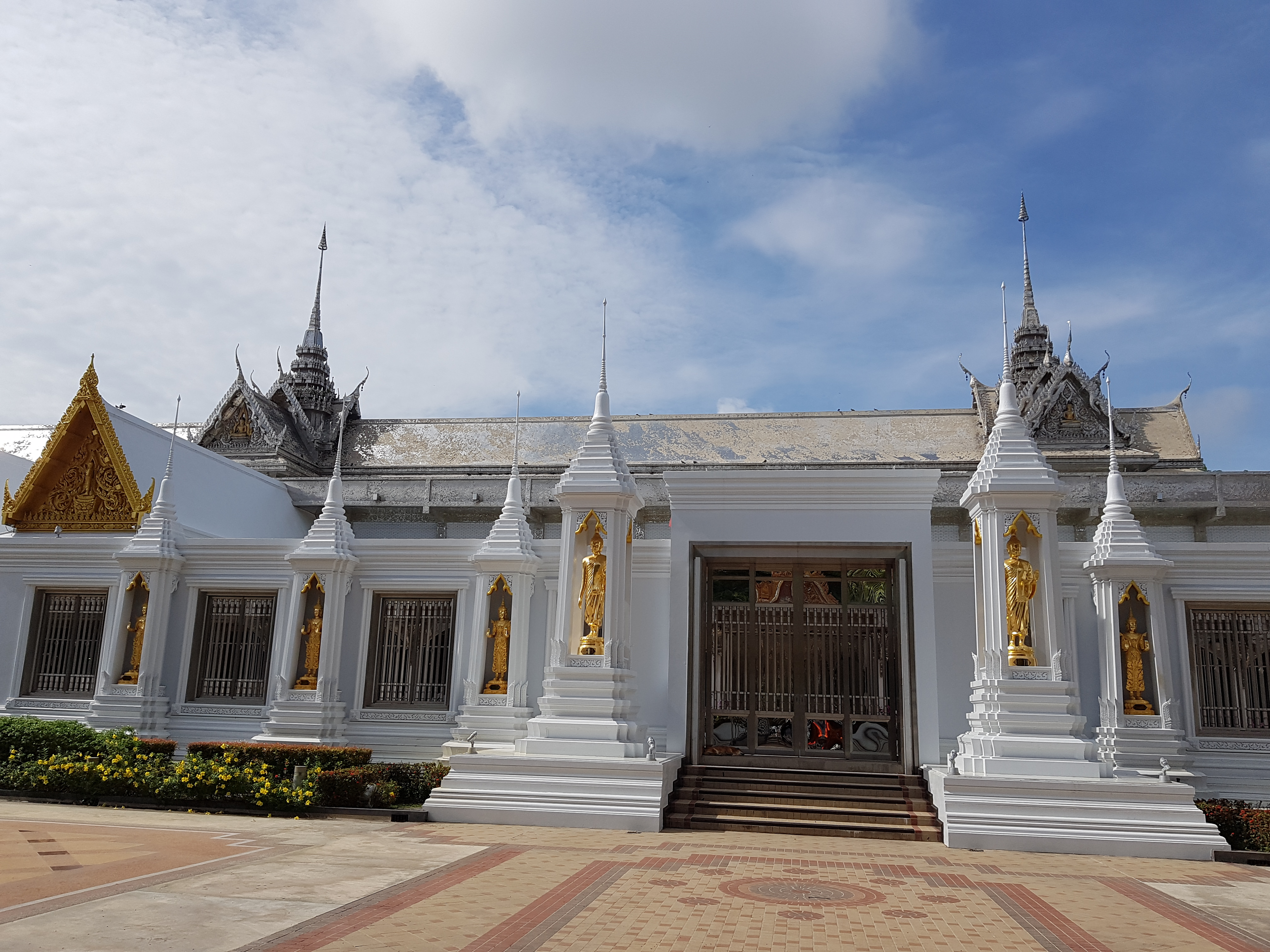
Vihara Kaew 100 Meter

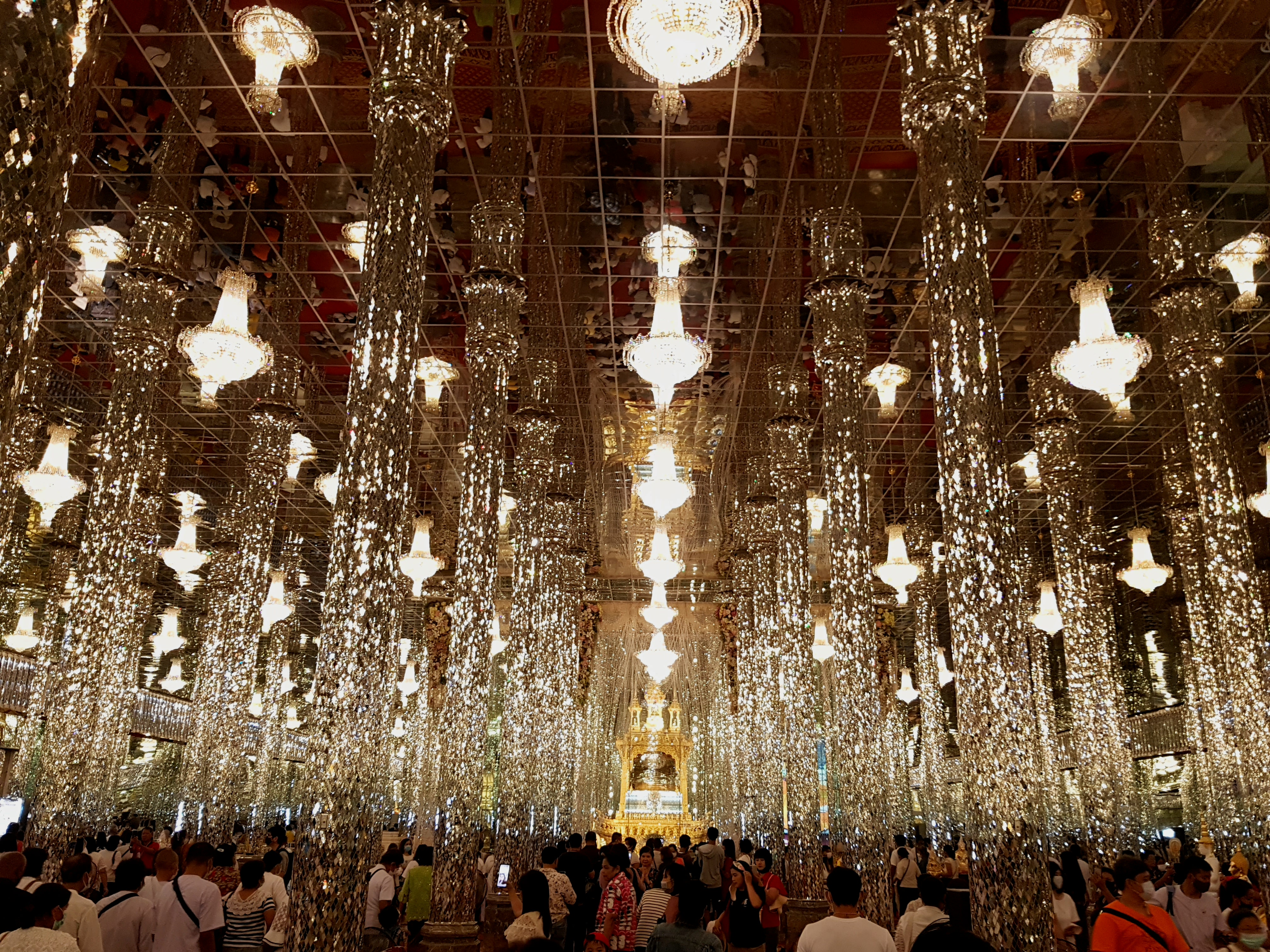
Busabok enshrining Phra Ratchaprommayan’s body in the 100-Meter Glass Vihara

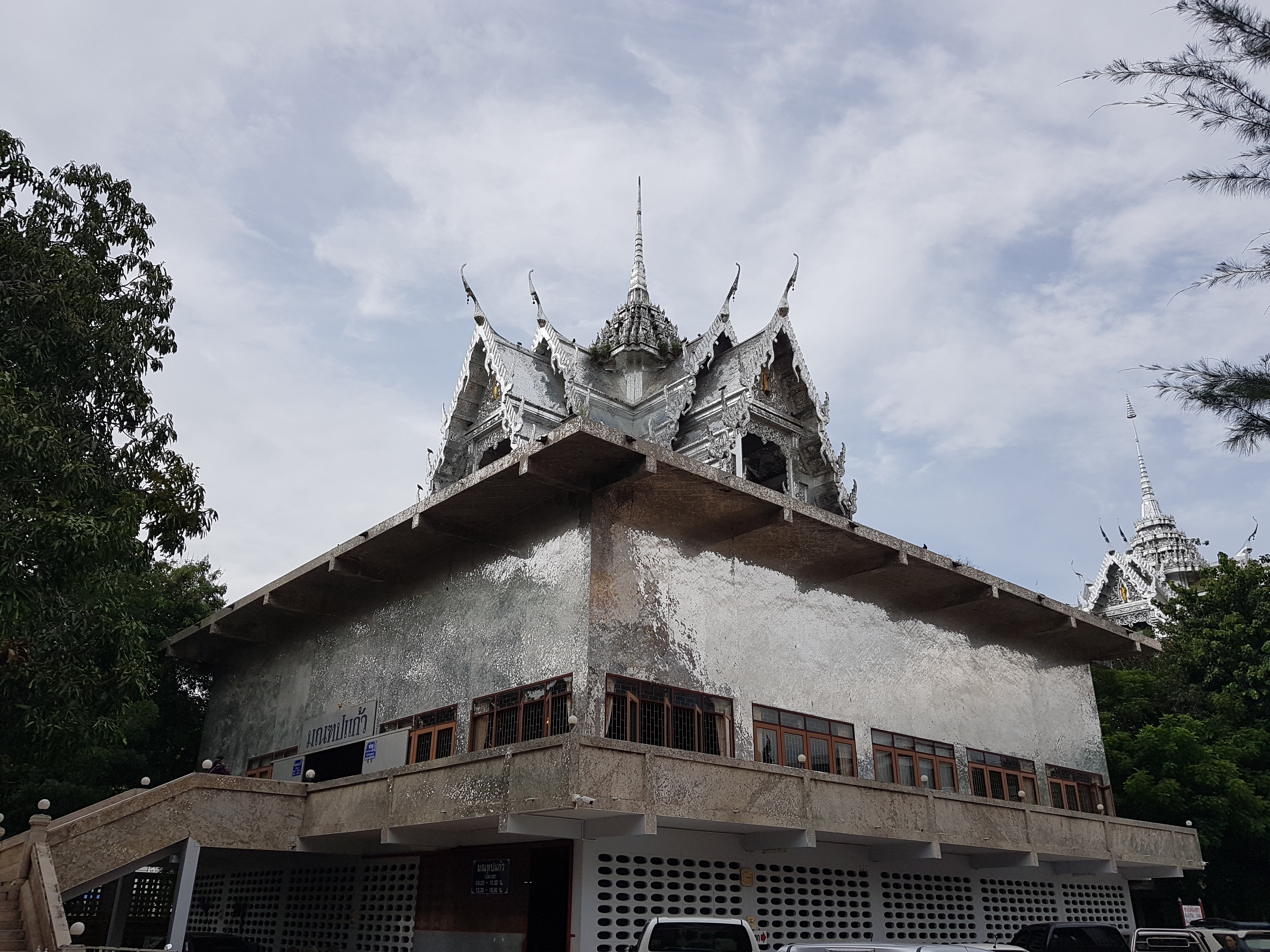
Mondop Kaew

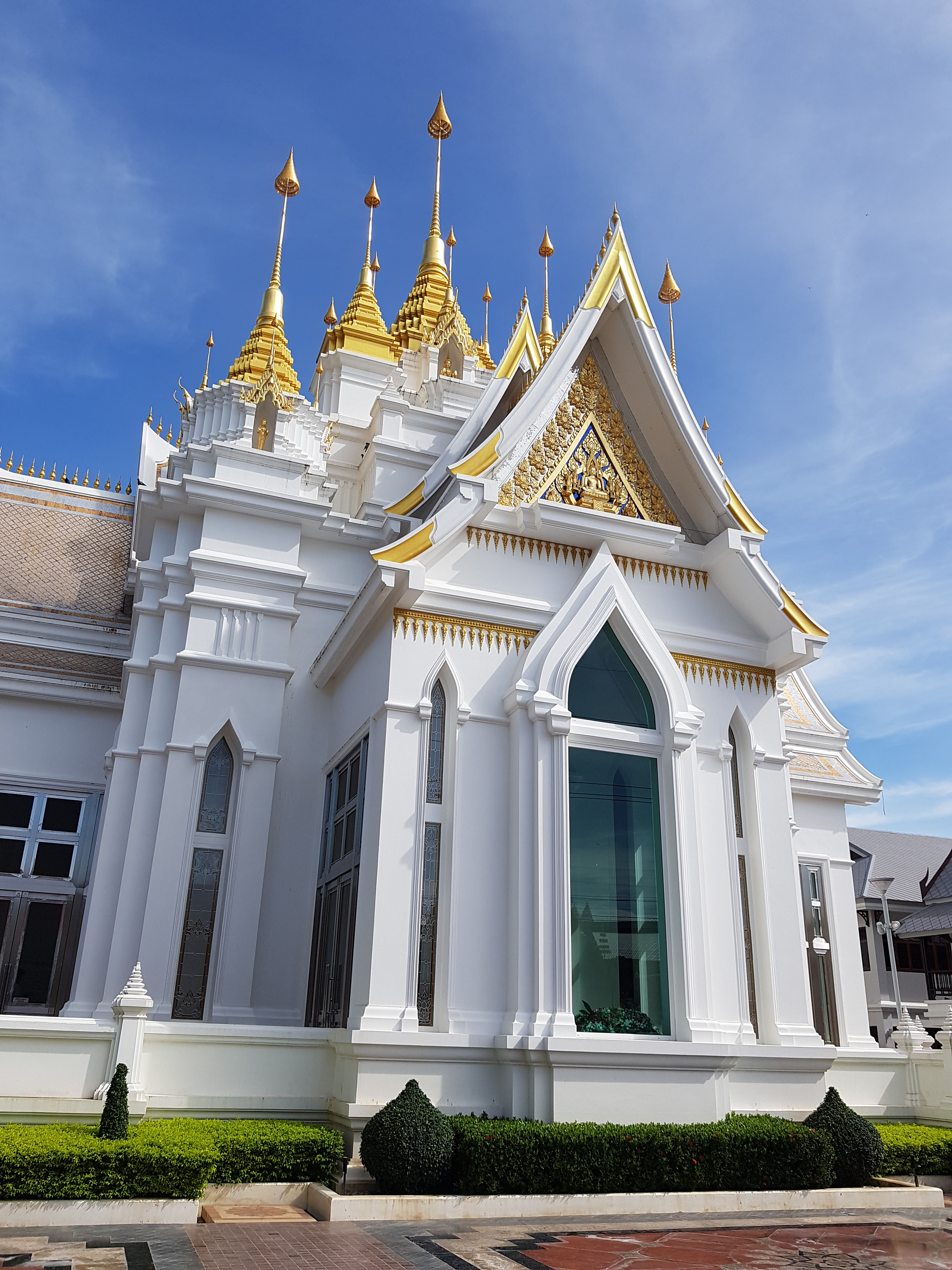
Vihara of the Five Buddhas

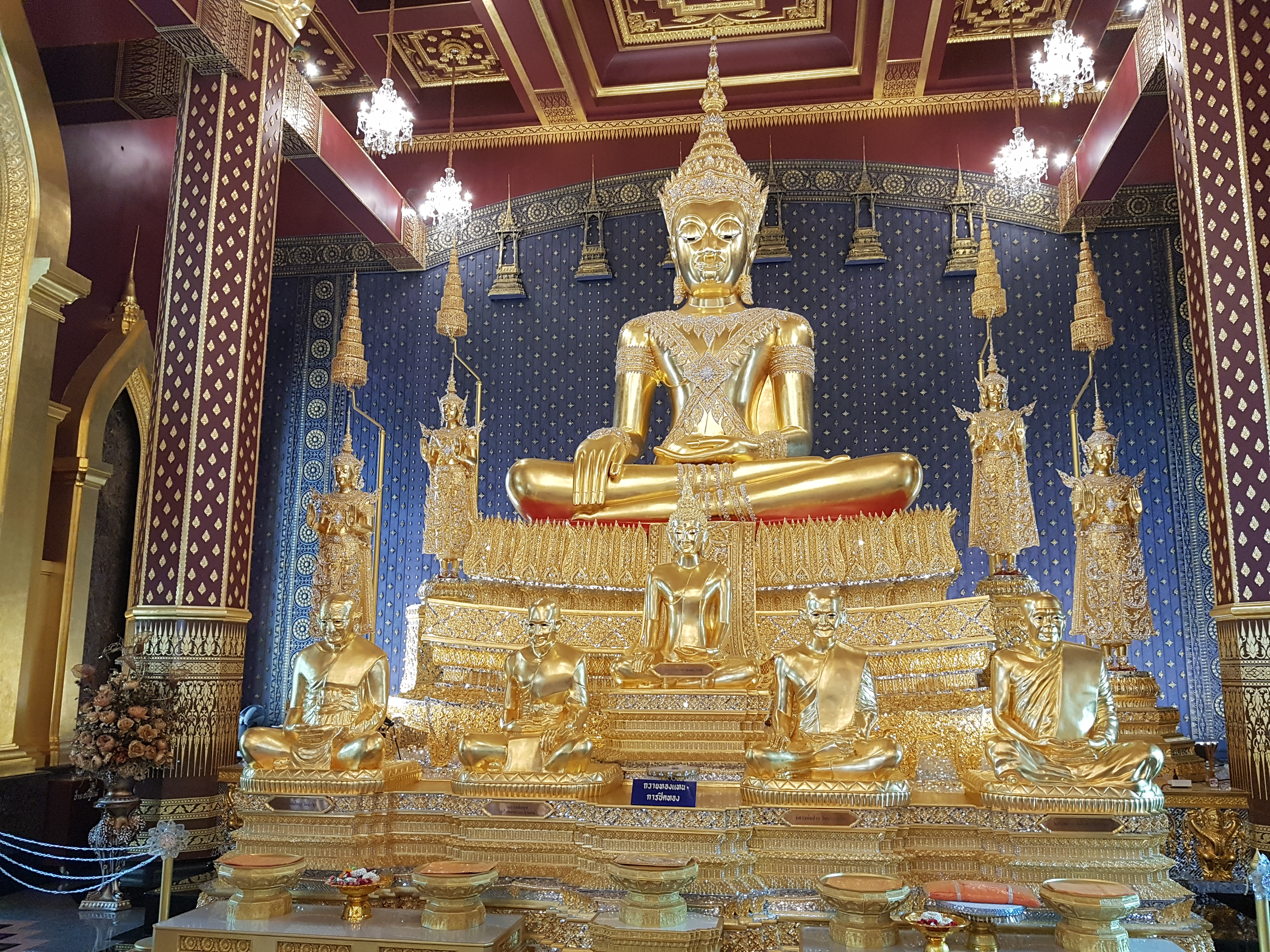
Inside the Vihara of the Five Buddhas

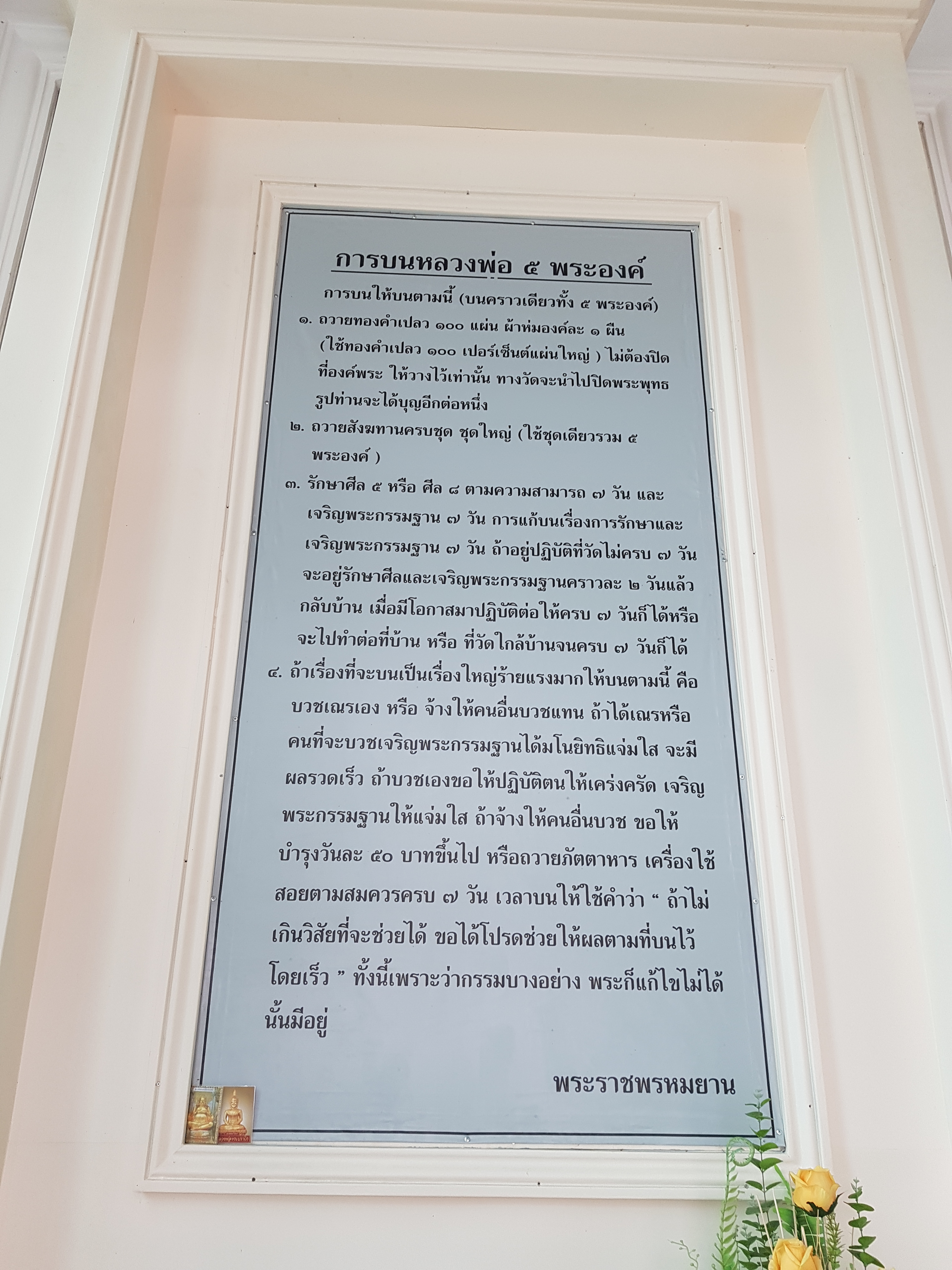
Devotional offerings to the Five Buddhas

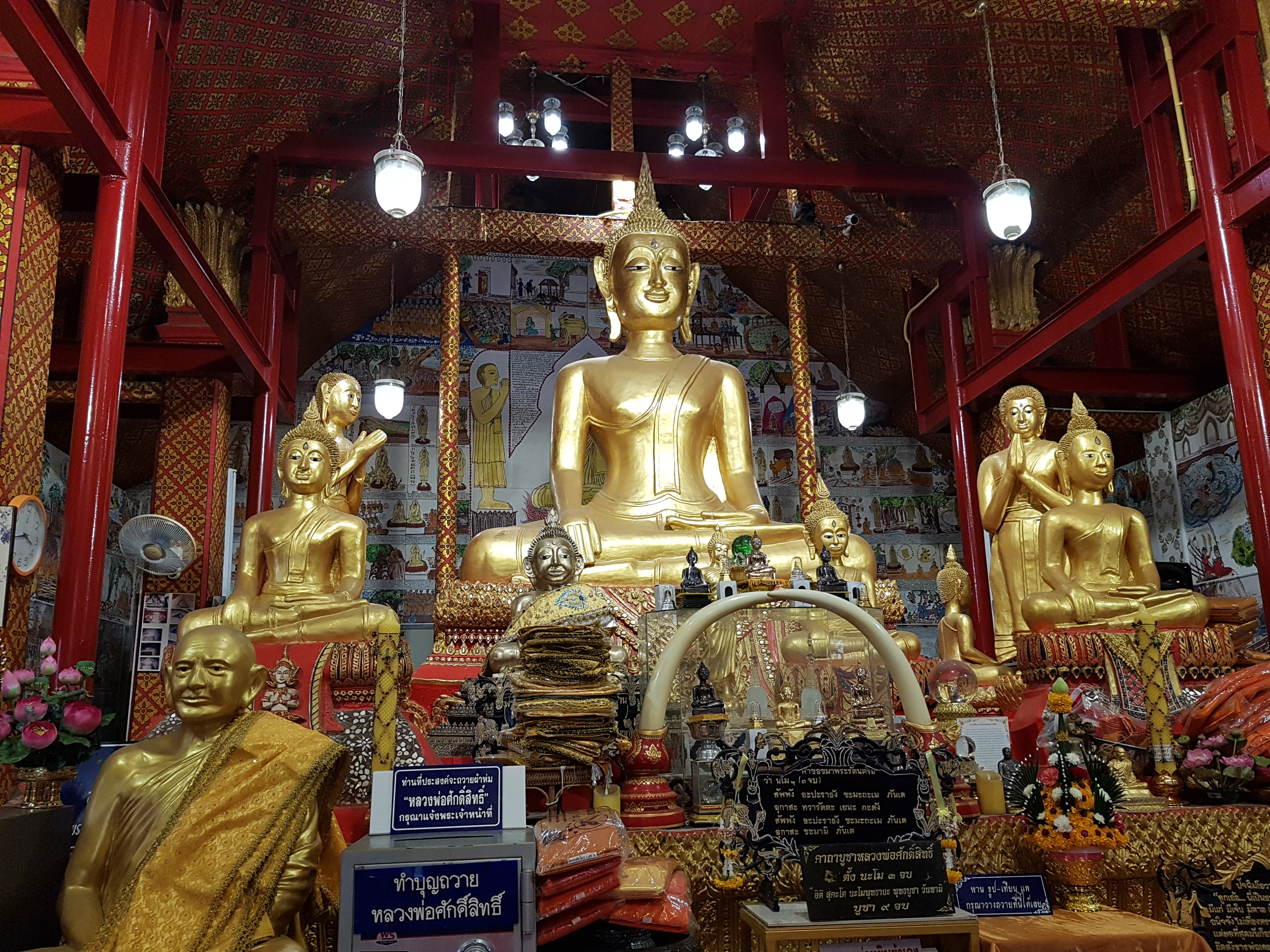
Vihara of Luang Pho Saksit

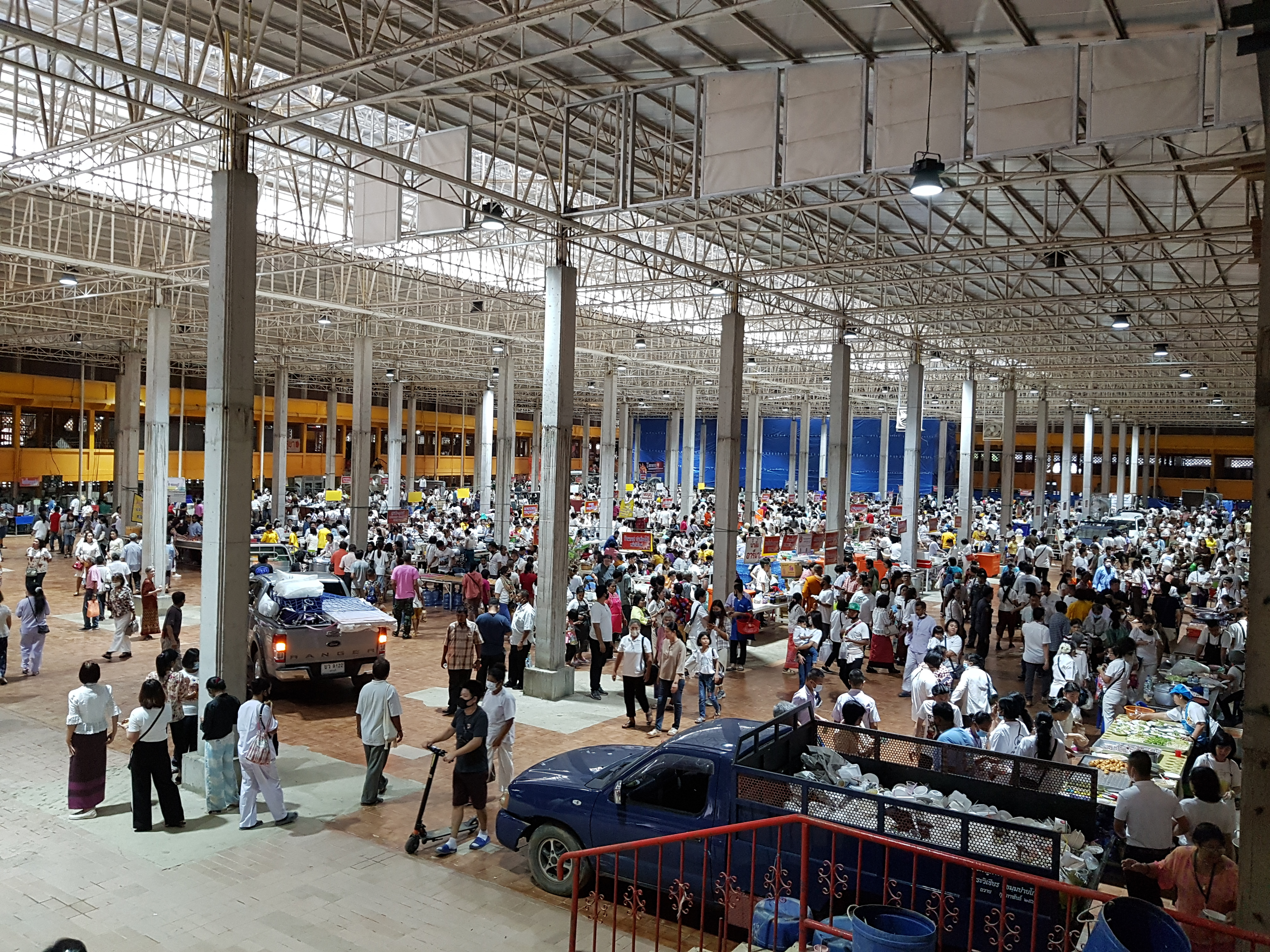
Kathina Festival Dining Hall
