= Wat Sing district =

Wat Sing วัดสิงห์
- District
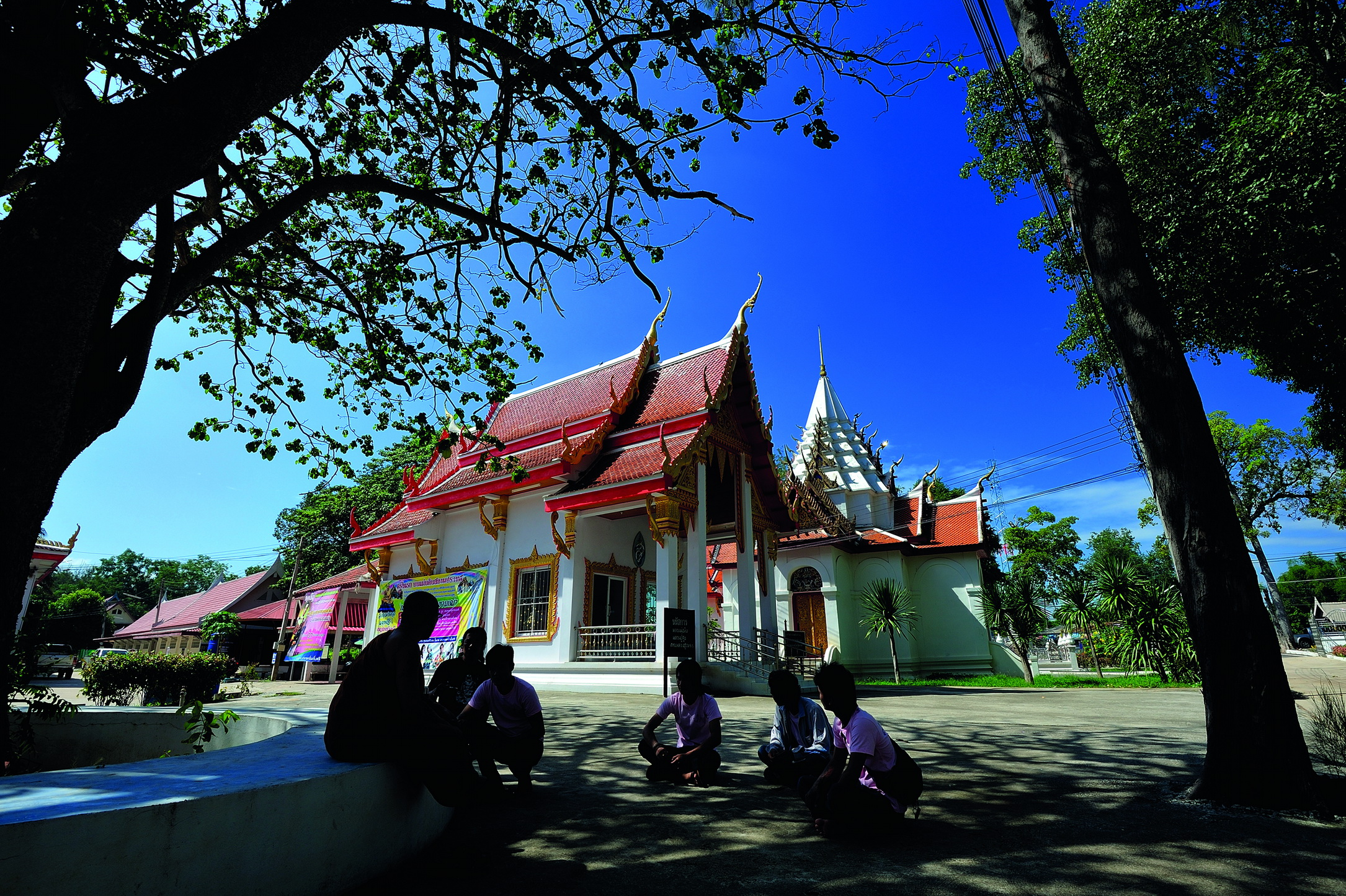
- Wat Pak Khlong Makham Thao in tambon Makham Thao

- District location in Chai Nat province
- Coordinates: 15°15′19″N 100°2′17″E
- Country: Thailand
- Province: Chai Nat
- Seat: Makham Thao

Area
  - Total: 315.318 km^{2} (121.745 sq mi)

Population (2008)
  - Total: 26,389
  - Density: 83.5/km^{2} (216/sq mi)
- Time zone: UTC+7 (ICT)
- Postal code: 17120
- Geocode: 1803

Wat Sing (Thai: วัดสิงห์, pronounced [wát sǐŋ]) is a district (amphoe) in the northern part of Chai Nat province, central Thailand.

== Geography ==
Neighboring districts are (from the northeast clockwise) Manorom, Mueang Chai Nat, Hankha and Nong Mamong of Chai Nat Province; Nong Khayang and Mueang Uthai Thani of Uthai Thani province.

== Administration ==
The district is divided into seven sub-districts (tambons), which are further subdivided into 47 villages (mubans). Wat Sing is a sub-district municipality (thesaban tambon) which covers tambon Wat Sing. There are a further six tambon administrative organizations (TAO).

No.	Name	Thai	Villages	Pop.
1.	Wat Sing	วัดสิงห์	-	4,028
2.	Makham Thao	มะขามเฒ่า	11	5,174
3.	Nong Noi	หนองน้อย	8	3,744
4.	Nong Bua	หนองบัว	5	2,755
6.	Nong Khun	หนองขุ่น	8	3,443
7.	Bo Rae	บ่อแร่	7	2,886
11.	Wang Man	วังหมัน	8	4,359

Missing numbers are tambon which now form Nong Mamong District.
