= Huai Thap Salao =

Watercourse in Thailand

Coordinates: 15°24′N 99°47′E

Huai Thap Salao Reservior

Huai Thap Salao (Thai: ห้วยทัพเสลา, pronounced [hûa̯j tʰáp sā.lǎw]) is a river located in Uthai Thani Province, Thailand. It is a tributary of the Sakae Krang River, part of the Chao Phraya River basin.

== Geography ==
The headwaters of Huai Thap Salao originate in the mountain of western Uthai Thani Province. The River flows Southeastward through Lan Sak and Nong Chang Districts. After reaching Ban Thap Salao in Nong Chang District, the watercourse divides into two branches. One branch flows through Thap Than District towaed Ban Khok Mo, while the other passes through Nong Chang and Nong Khayang districts before joining the Sakae Krang River at Ban Pak Kabat in Mueang Uthai Thani District.

== Thap Salao Dam ==
The Thap Salao Dam is constructed acros the Huai Thap Salao, creating a reservior upstream of Dam. The reservior has a normal storage capacity of approximately 160 milions cubic metres.

== Watershed ==
The Huai Thap Salao sub-basin covers an area of 755.24 square kilometers, representing approximately 15.39 percent of the total area of Sakae Krang River.

== Hydrology ==
The Royal Irrigation Department operates gauging station Ct.20 om the lower Huai Thap Salao at Ban Saphan Leak in Lan Sak District. The station monitors a drainage are of 674 square kilometers, with hydrological records avaliable from 2002 onward.

== Land use ==
A study of land-use changes Huai Thap Salao watershed reported a decline in forest cover between 1988 and 2007, while the use for agriculture, build-up land, and water bodies increased during the same period.

== Wildlife sanctuary ==
Most of the upper catchment of Huai Thap Salao is located within the Huai Tha Khaeng Wildlife Sanctuary, which is part of the Thungyai-Huai Kha Khaeng Wildlife Sanctuaries World Heritage Site.
