= Sakae Krang River =

Coordinates: 15°18′09″N 100°04′50″E

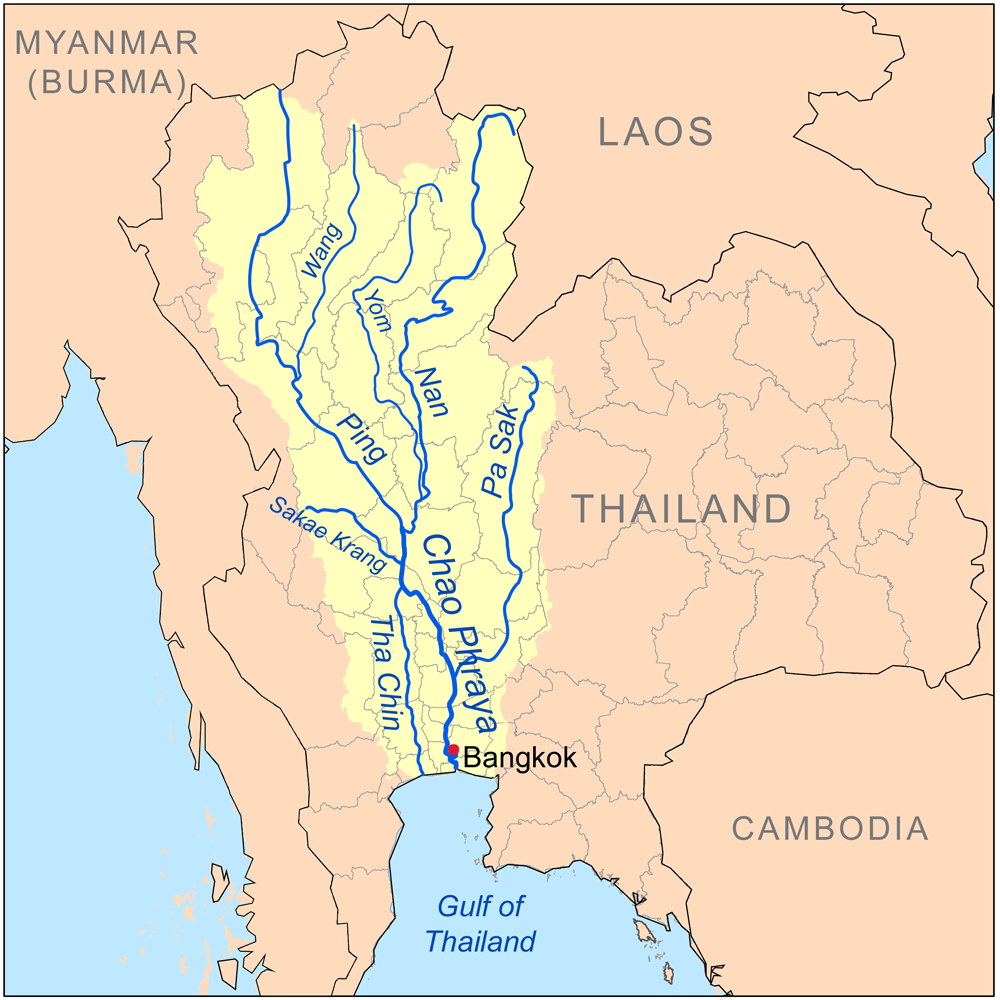
- Map of the Chao Phraya River drainage basin showing the Sakae Krang River

Location
- Country: Thailand

Physical characteristics
- Source
  - location: Khao Plai Huai Kha Khaeng, Mae Wong National Park, Nakhon Sawan Province
- Mouth
  - location: Chao Phraya River in Uthai Thani city
- Length: 225 km (140 mi)
- Basin size: 5,191 km^{2} (2,004 sq mi)

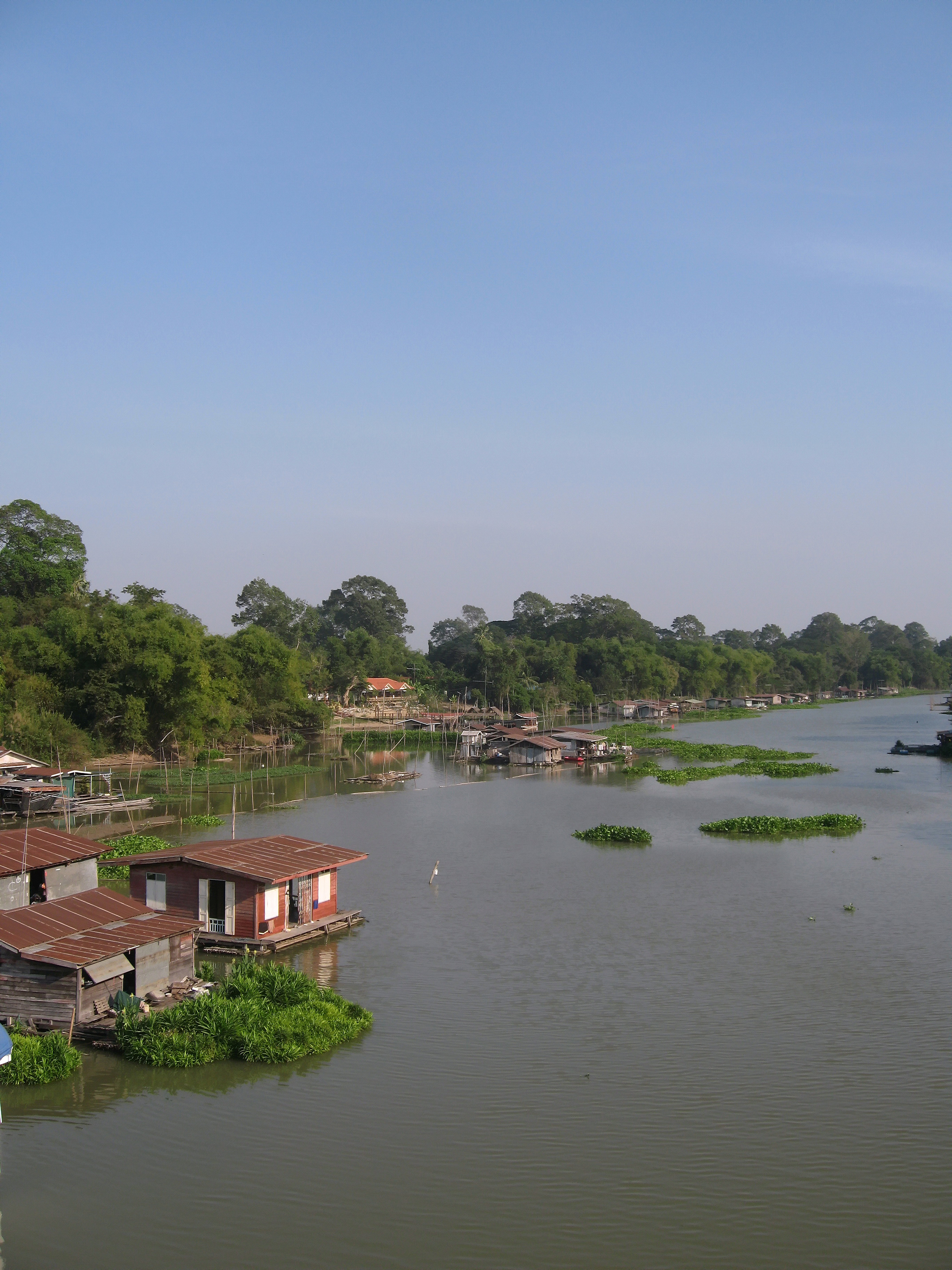
Sakae Krang River in the Uthai Thani city

The Sakae Krang River (Thai: แม่น้ำสะแกกรัง, RTGS: Maenam Sakae Krang, pronounced [mɛ̂ː.náːm sā.kɛ̄ː krāŋ]) is a tributary of the Chao Phraya River. It originates in Mae Wong National Park, Nakhon Sawan Province. It is 225 kilometres (140 mi) long, with most of its length in Uthai Thani Province. It joins the Chao Phraya River in Uthai Thani city near the Wat Tha Sung (Tha Sung Temple).

According to the Tourism Authority of Thailand, the people of Uthai Thani use the Sakae Krang River to grow pandanus and to raise fish in floating baskets, which is the primary occupation of the Uthai Thani people.

== Local names ==
The Sakae Krang River has several local names. From its origin in the Western Forest Complex in Nakhon Sawan, it is called Huai Pha Daeng (Thai: ห้วยผาแดง) and then Huai Duea (ห้วยเดื่อ); while flowing along the border between Nakhon Sawan and Kamphaeng Phet provinces, it is known as Huai Mae Wong (ห้วยแม่วงก์) or Nam Mae Wong (น้ำแม่วงก์); while flowing through Nakhon Sawan again, it is sequentially called Nam Mae Wong, Nam Wang Ma (น้ำวังม้า) and Nam Tak Daet (น้ำตากแดด); it becomes the Tak Daet River (แม่น้ำตากแดด) while passing Sawang Arom and Thap Than districts of Uthai Thani, and while forming the border between Mueang Uthai Thani District of Uthai Thani and Krok Phra District of Nakhon Sawan. Only its final section in Mueang Uthai Thani District is called the Sakae Krang River, which empties into the Chao Phraya River.

== Tributaries ==
The main tributaries of the Sakae Krang River include Huai Thap Salao and Khlong Pho.

== Sakae Krang Basin ==
The Sakae Krang is part of the Chao Phraya Watershed. The total land area drained by the Sakae Krang River is 5,191 square kilometres (2,004 sq mi).

== Flood of 2011 ==
In 2011, after high rainfall and poor flood control management, much of the Sakae Krang River overflowed its banks between September and November that year. The main riverside market in Uthai Thani City was under up to 160 centimetres (5 ft) of water for over seven weeks. The new market a few kilometers away was also severely flooded for almost as long.
