= Khlong Pho (Sakae Krang tributary) =

River in Thailand

Khlong Pho (Thai: คลองโพธิ์ or คลองโพ, pronounced [kʰlɔ̄ːŋ pʰōː]) is a watercourse in the provinces of Nakhon Sawan and Uthai Thani, Thailand. It is a tributary of the Sakae Krang River, part of the Chao Phraya River basin.
