= Ban Rai district =

Ban Rai บ้านไร่
- District
- District location in Uthai Thani province
- Coordinates: 15°5′2″N 99°31′16″E
- Country: Thailand
- Province: Uthai Thani

Area
  - Total: 3,621.5 km^{2} (1,398.3 sq mi)

Population (2005)
  - Total: 66,167
  - Density: 18.3/km^{2} (47/sq mi)
- Time zone: UTC+7 (ICT)
- Postal code: 61140
- Geocode: 6106

Ban Rai (Thai: บ้านไร่, pronounced [bâːn râj]) is a district (amphoe) in Uthai Thani province in western Thailand.

== Geography ==
The district covers more than half of the province of Uthai Thani and is also the third-largest district in Thailand. A large part of the district is part of the Huai Kha Khaeng Wildlife Sanctuary.

Neighboring districts are (from the north clockwise) Mae Poen of Nakhon Sawan province; Lan Sak, Huai Khot, and Nong Chang of Uthai Thani Province; Nong Mamong, Hankha, and Noen Kham of Chai Nat province; Dan Chang of Suphan Buri province; Si Sawat and Thong Pha Phum of Kanchanaburi province; and Umphang of Tak province.

== Administration ==
The district is divided into 13 sub-districts (tambons), which are further subdivided into 134 villages (mubans). There are two townships (thesaban tambon). Ban Rai covers parts of tambons Ban Rai and Ban Bueng, and Mueang Ka Rung covers parts of the same-named tambon. There are a further 12 tambon administrative organizations (TAO).

No.	Name	Thai name	Villages	Pop.
1.	Ban Rai	บ้านไร่	11	8,616
2.	Thap Luang	ทัพหลวง	15	7,988
3.	Huai Haeng	ห้วยแห้ง	9	4,748
4.	Khok Khwai	คอกควาย	16	7,154
5.	Wang Hin	วังหิน	6	3,502
6.	Mueang Ka Rung	เมืองการุ้ง	13	6,905
7.	Kaen Makrut	แก่นมะกรูด	4	1,621
9.	Nong Chok	หนองจอก	15	5,296
10.	Hu Chang	หูช้าง	13	6,556
11.	Ban Bueng	บ้านบึง	7	3,320
12.	Ban Mai Khlong Khian	บ้านใหม่คลองเคียน	8	3,219
13.	Nong Bom Kluai	หนองบ่มกล้วย	10	3,318
14.	Chao Wat	เจ้าวัด	7	3,924

== Economy ==
The village of Baan Tab Klai is known for its cultivation of eri silkworms to produce eri silk. Silkworm farmers have created a collective to produce the fibre using clean technologies such as all-natural dyes. The moths that produce the cocoons are not harmed in the process, leading some to call it "peace silk".
