= Nong Khayang district =

Nong Khayang หนองขาหย่าง
- District
- District location in Uthai Thani province
- Coordinates: 15°21′51″N 99°55′45″E
- Country: Thailand
- Province: Uthai Thani

Area
  - Total: 347.776 km^{2} (134.277 sq mi)

Population (2005)
  - Total: 16,369
  - Density: 47.1/km^{2} (122/sq mi)
- Time zone: UTC+7 (ICT)
- Postal code: 61130
- Geocode: 6105

Nong Khayang (Thai: หนองขาหย่าง, pronounced [nɔ̌ːŋ kʰǎː.jàːŋ]) is a district (amphoe) of Uthai Thani province, northern Thailand.

== History ==
Nong Luang (หนองหลวง) was an important border checkpoint since the Ayutthaya Era. In 1917 when the government changed the district status khwaeng to amphoe as in other provinces, Nong Luang was a district of Uthai Thani Province. The following year the district office of Nong Luang was moved to Noen Po and the district renamed Nong Khayang.

== Geography ==
Neighbouring districts are (from the west clockwise) Nong Chang, Thap Than, and Mueang Uthai Thani of Uthai Thani Province; Wat Sing and Nong Mamong of Chai Nat province.

== Administration ==
The district is divided into nine sub-districts (tambons), which are further subdivided into 53 villages (mubans). Nong Khayang is a township (thesaban tambon) which covers parts of tambon Nong Khayang. There are a further five tambon administrative organizations (TAO).

No.	Name	Thai name	Villages	Pop.
1.	Nong Khayang	หนองขาหย่าง	8	2,770
2.	Nong Phai	หนองไผ่	9	2,502
3.	Don Kloi	ดอนกลอย	6	1,240
4.	Huai Rop	ห้วยรอบ	3	503
5.	Thung Phueng	ทุ่งพึ่ง	7	1,461
6.	Tha Pho	ท่าโพ	4	2,266
7.	Mok Thaeo	หมกแถว	3	605
8.	Lum Khao	หลุมเข้า	7	2,524
9.	Dong Khwang	ดงขวาง	6	2,498
