= Tewa Promma =

Thai footballer

Personal information
- Full name: Tewa Promma
- Date of birth: April 20, 1988 (age 38)
- Place of birth: Uthai Thani, Thailand
- Height: 1.72 m (5 ft 7 1/2 in)
- Position: Striker

Team information
- Current team: Suphanburi
- Number: 27

Senior career*
Years	Team	Apps	(Gls)
2007–2008	Royal Thai Police	19	(2)
2009	Samut Songkhram	8	(0)
2009–present	Suphanburi	12	(1)
- * Club domestic league appearances and goals as of 14 October 2008

Tewa Promma is a Thai footballer. He currently plays for Thai Division 1 League clubside Suphanburi.

== See also ==
- Football in Thailand
- List of football clubs in Thailand
