= Uthai Thani =

Town in Uthai Thani province, Thailand

Coordinates: 15°22′48″N 100°01′30″E

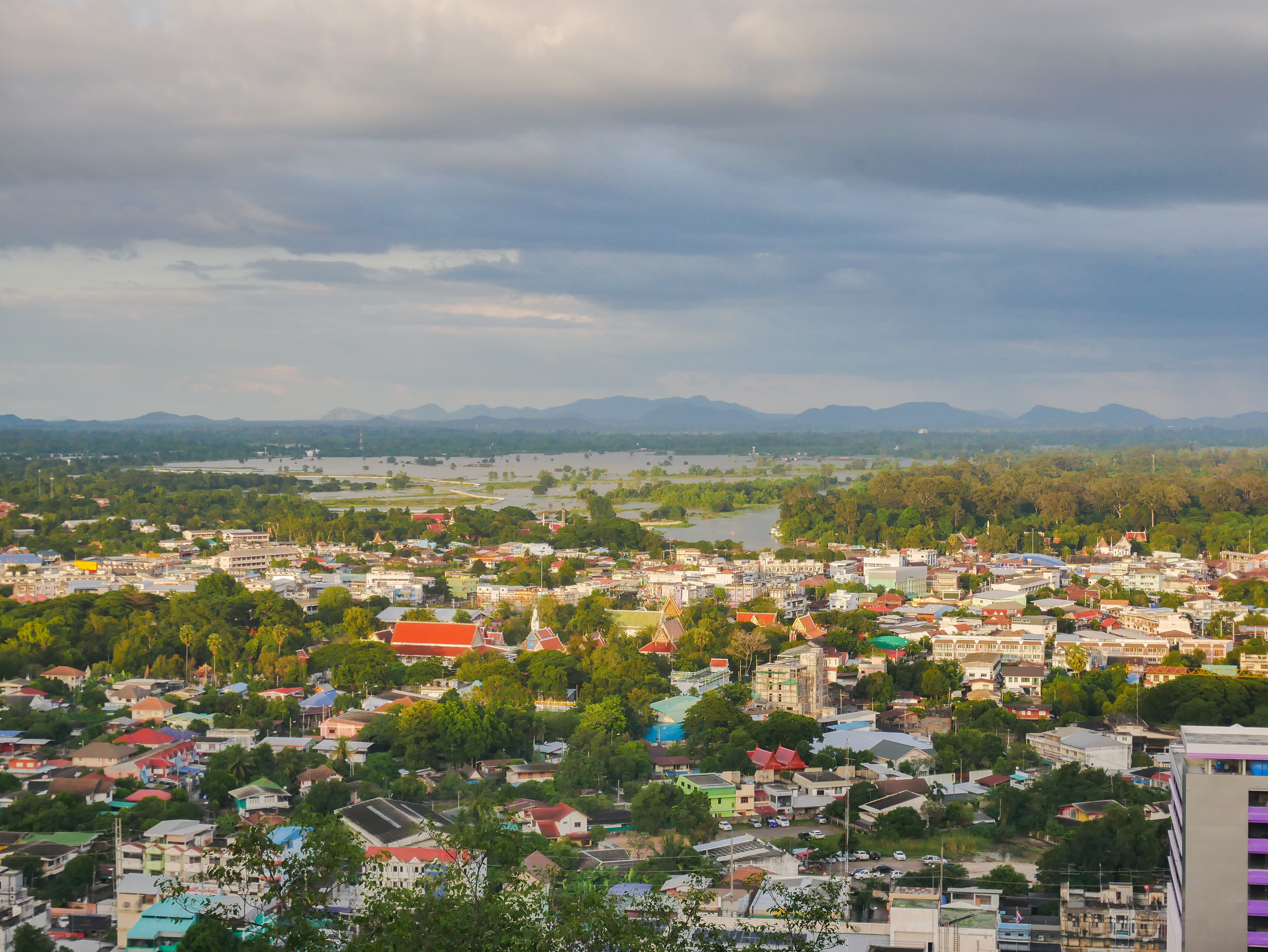
View of Uthai Thani

Uthai Thani (Thai: อุทัยธานี, pronounced [ʔù.tʰāj tʰāː.nīː]) is a town (thesaban mueang) in Thailand, capital of the Uthai Thani Province, in the upper central region of the country. The town lies approximately 200 km north-west of Bangkok. It includes the entire tambon Uthai Mai of Mueang Uthai Thani district. The town is on the right bank of the Sakae Krang River, a few kilometers upstream from where it flows into the Chao Phraya. In 2008 it had a population of 16,787.

== Notable people ==
- Tewa Promma (born 1988), Thai footballer
