= Huai Khot district =

Huai Khot ห้วยคต
- District
- District location in Uthai Thani province
- Coordinates: 15°17′29″N 99°37′0″E
- Country: Thailand
- Province: Uthai Thani
- Seat: Huai Khot

Area
  - Total: 424.17 km^{2} (163.77 sq mi)

Population (2005)
  - Total: 19,547
  - Density: 46.1/km^{2} (119/sq mi)
- Time zone: UTC+7 (ICT)
- Postal code: 61170
- Geocode: 6108

Huai Khot (Thai: ห้วยคต, pronounced [hûa̯j kʰót]) is a district (amphoe) in the central part of Uthai Thani province, northern Thailand.

== History ==
Tambons Huai Khot, Suk Ruethai and Thong Lang were separated from Ban Rai district and formed Huai Khot minor district (king amphoe) on 1 August 1984. It was upgraded to a full district on 3 November 1993.

== Geography ==
Neighbouring districts are (from the south clockwise) Ban Rai, Lan Sak and Nong Chang of Uthai Thani Province.

== Administration ==
The district is divided into three sub-districts (tambons), which are further subdivided into 31 villages (mubans). There are no municipal (thesaban) areas. There are a further three tambon administrative organizations (TAO).

| No. | Name | Thai name | Villages | Pop. |
|---|---|---|---|---|
| 1. | Suk Ruethai | สุขฤทัย | 13 | 6,564 |
| 2. | Thong Lang | ทองหลาง | 8 | 7,043 |
| 3. | Huai Khot | ห้วยคต | 10 | 5,940 |
