= Nong Chang district =

Nong Chang หนองฉาง
- District
- District location in Uthai Thani province
- Coordinates: 15°23′29″N 99°50′29″E
- Country: Thailand
- Province: Uthai Thani
- Seat: Nong Chang

Area
  - Total: 341.2 km^{2} (131.7 sq mi)

Population (2008)
  - Total: 44,366
  - Density: 131.4/km^{2} (340/sq mi)
- Time zone: UTC+7 (ICT)
- Postal code: 61110
- Geocode: 6104

Nong Chang (Thai: หนองฉาง, pronounced [nɔ̌ːŋ t͡ɕʰǎːŋ]) is a district (amphoe) of Uthai Thani province, northern Thailand.

== Geography ==
Neighboring districts are (from the southwest clockwise) Huai Khot, Lan Sak, Thap Than, Nong Khayang of Uthai Thani Province and Nong Mamong of Chai Nat province.

== History ==
In 1917 the district was renamed from Uthai Kao (อุทัยเก่า) to Nong Chang.

== Administration ==
The district is divided into 10 sub-districts (tambons), which are further subdivided into 96 villages (mubans). There are two sub-district municipalities (thesaban tambon) in the district: Khao Bang Kraek covers tambon Khao Bang Kraek, and Nong Chang covers parts of tambon Nong Chang and Nong Suang.

No.	Name	Thai	Villages	Pop.
1.	Nong Chang	หนองฉาง	7	5,173
2.	Nong Yang	หนองยาง	10	5,588
3.	Nong Nang Nuan	หนองนางนวล	10	3,129
4.	Nong Suang	หนองสรวง	5	2,616
5.	Ban Kao	บ้านเก่า	9	1,405
6.	Uthai Kao	อุทัยเก่า	10	2,487
7.	Thung Pho	ทุ่งโพ	15	7,973
8.	Thung Phong	ทุ่งพง	11	2,156
9.	Khao Bang Kraek	เขาบางแกรก	7	6,556
10.	Khao Kwang Thong	เขากวางทอง	12	7,283
