= Thap Than district =

Thap Than ทัพทัน
- District
- District location in Uthai Thani province
- Coordinates: 15°27′35″N 99°53′12″E
- Country: Thailand
- Province: Uthai Thani

Area
  - Total: 323.633 km^{2} (124.955 sq mi)

Population (2008)
  - Total: 38,631
  - Density: 119.3/km^{2} (309/sq mi)
- Time zone: UTC+7 (ICT)
- Postal code: 61120
- Geocode: 6102

Thap Than (Thai: ทัพทัน, pronounced [tʰáp tʰān]) is a district (amphoe) in the northern part of Uthai Thani province, northern Thailand.

== History ==
In a Siamese-Burmese war of Ayutthaya era, the troops of Ayutthaya followed the Burmese troops and overtook them in the area of the district. They fought and the Siamese troops won. The people named the area Ban Thap Than.

In 1906 the district was renamed from Nong Kradi to Thap Than.

In 1917, Thap Than district was added to Uthai Thani Province.

== Geography ==
Neighboring districts are (from the southeast clockwise) Mueang Uthai Thani, Nong Khayang, Nong Chang, Lan Sak, and Sawang Arom of Uthai Thani Province; Krok Phra of Nakhon Sawan province.

== Administration ==
The district is divided into 10 sub-districts (tambons), which are further subdivided into 90 villages (mubans). The sub-district municipality (thesaban tambon), Thap Than, covers tambons Thap Than, Thung Na Thai, Khao Khi Foi, and Nong Ya Plong. The sub-district municipality Taluk Du covers the tambon Taluk Du. There are a further five tambon administrative organizations (TAO).

List of tambons in Thap Than District
No.	Name	Thai	Villages	Pop.
1.	Thap Than	ทัพทัน	8	4,533
2.	Thung Na Thai	ทุ่งนาไทย	7	1,587
3.	Khao Khi Foi	เขาขี้ฝอย	6	1,340
4.	Nong Ya Plong	หนองหญ้าปล้อง	6	1,687
5.	Khok Mo	โคกหม้อ	5	2,312
6.	Nong Yai Da	หนองยายดา	8	3,126
7.	Nong Klang Dong	หนองกลางดง	11	3,051
8.	Nong Krathum	หนองกระทุ่ม	15	7,240
9.	Nong Sa	หนองสระ	7	2,124
10.	Taluk Du	ตลุกดู่	17	11,631
