= Mueang Uthai Thani district =

Mueang Uthai Thani เมืองอุทัยธานี
- District
- District location in Uthai Thani province
- Coordinates: 15°22′46″N 100°1′29″E
- Country: Thailand
- Province: Uthai Thani

Area
  - Total: 250.1 km^{2} (96.6 sq mi)

Population (2005)
  - Total: 52,591
  - Density: 210.3/km^{2} (545/sq mi)
- Time zone: UTC+7 (ICT)
- Postal code: 61000
- Geocode: 6101

Mueang Uthai Thani (Thai: เมืองอุทัยธานี, pronounced [mɯ̄a̯ŋ ʔù.tʰāj tʰāː.nīː]) is the capital district (amphoe mueang) of Uthai Thani province, northern Thailand.

== Geography ==
Neighboring districts are (from the west clockwise) Nong Khayang and Thap Than, of Uthai Thani Province; Krok Phra and Phayuha Khiri of Nakhon Sawan province; Manorom and Wat Sing of Chai Nat province.

== Administration ==
The district is divided into 14 sub-districts (tambons), which are further subdivided into 86 villages (mubans). The town (thesaban mueang) Uthai Thani covers the whole tambon Uthai Mai. There are a further eight tambon administrative organizations (TAO).

No.	Name	Thai name	Villages	Pop.
1.	Uthai Mai	อุทัยใหม่	-	17,510
2.	Nam Suem	น้ำซึม	7	6,148
3.	Sakae Krang	สะแกกรัง	8	4,773
4.	Don Khwang	ดอนขวาง	7	3,197
5.	Hat Thanong	หาดทนง	6	2,036
6.	Ko Thepho	เกาะเทโพ	6	2,480
7.	Tha Sung	ท่าซุง	8	3,951
8.	Nong Kae	หนองแก	6	2,059
9.	Non Lek	โนนเหล็ก	6	1,406
10.	Nong Tao	หนองเต่า	6	1,768
11.	Nong Phai Baen	หนองไผ่แบน	6	2,356
12.	Nong Phang Kha	หนองพังค่า	6	1,654
13.	Thung Yai	ทุ่งใหญ่	5	909
14.	Noen Chaeng	เนินแจง	9	2,344
