= Uthai Thani province =

Province of Thailand

Coordinates: 15°22′24″N 100°02′19″E

Uthai Thani อุทัยธานี
- Province
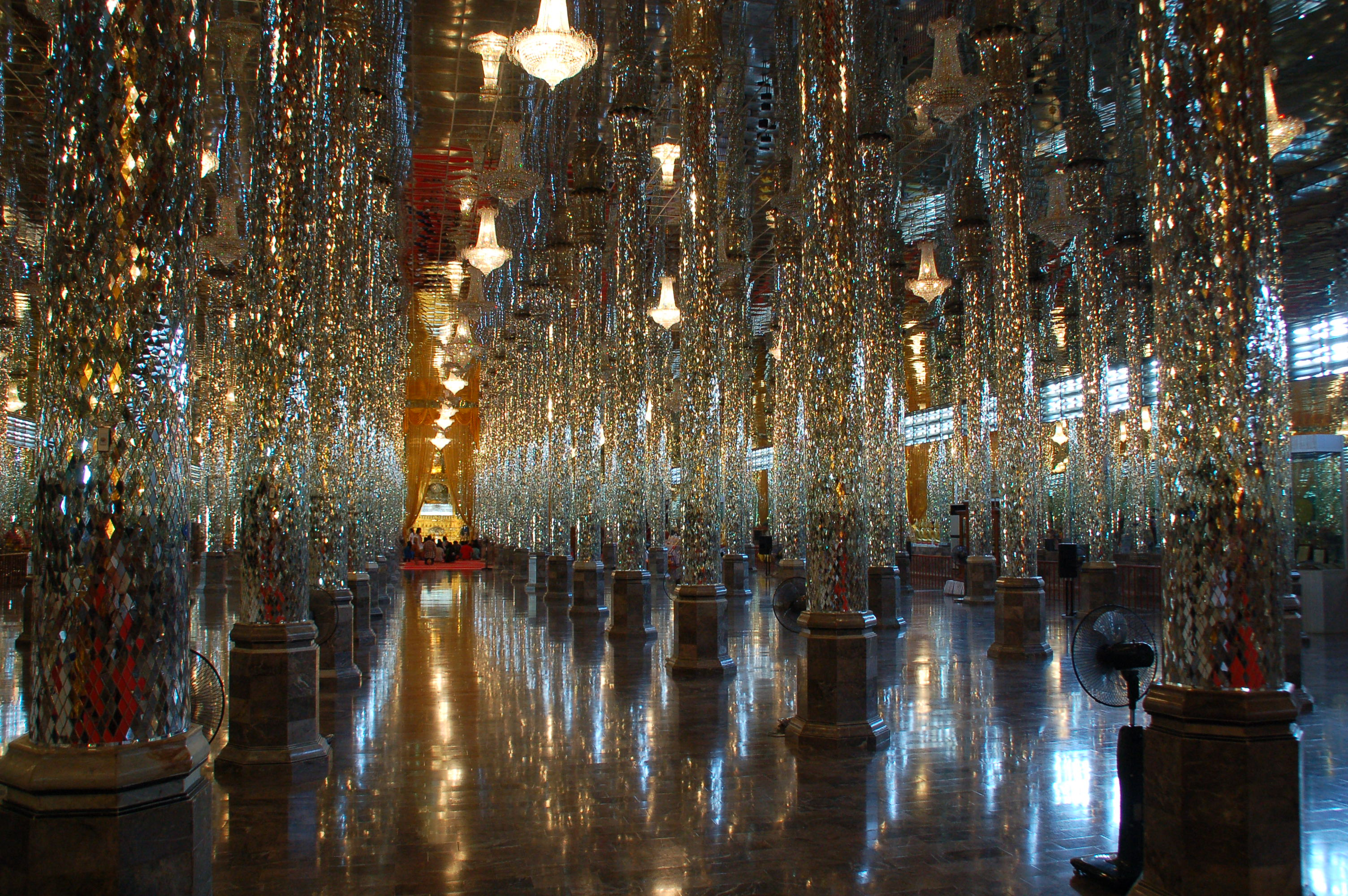
- Wat Chan Tharam

- Flag Seal
- Nickname: Uthai
- Motto: อุทัยธานี เมืองพระชนกจักรี ปลาแรดรสดี ประเพณีเทโว ส้มโอบ้านน้ำตก มรดกโลกห้วยขาแข้ง แหล่งต้นน้ำสะแกกรัง ตลาดนัดดังโคกระบือ ("Uthai Thani. City of the father of Chakri (dynasty). Tasty giant gourami fish. (Tak Bat) Devo festival. Ban Namtok's pomelos. Huai Kha Khaeng world heritage. Source of the Sakae Krang river. Famous cattle market.")
- Map of Thailand highlighting Uthai Thani province

- Location in Thailand
- Country: Thailand
- Capital: Uthai Thani

Government
  - Governor: Teerapat Katchamat

Area
  - Total: 6,647 km^{2} (2,566 sq mi)
  - Rank: 30th

Population (2024)
  - Total: ▼320,445
  - Rank: 68th
  - Density: 48/km^{2} (120/sq mi)
  - Rank: 73rd

Human Achievement Index
  - HAI (2022): 0.6369 "average" Ranked 44th

GDP
  - Total: baht 29 billion (US$1.0 billion) (2019)
- Time zone: UTC+7 (ICT)
- Postal code: 61xxx
- Calling code: 056
- ISO 3166 code: TH-61
- Website: uthaithani.go.th

Uthai Thani Provincial Administrative Organization องค์การบริหารส่วนจังหวัดอุทัยธานี
- Provincial Administrative Organization
- Interactive map of Uthai Thani Provincial Administrative Organization

Government
  - Type: Local administrative divisions
  - Body: Uthai Thani Provincial Administrative Organization
  - President: Phadet Nuipree
- Website: uthaipao.go.th

Uthai Thani (Thai: อุทัยธานี, pronounced [ʔù.tʰāj tʰāː.nīː]), one of Thailand's seventy-six provinces (changwat) lies in lower northern Thailand. Neighbouring provinces are (from north clockwise) Nakhon Sawan, Chai Nat, Suphan Buri, Kanchanaburi and Tak. It lies somewhat off the route between Bangkok, 200 km distant and Chiang Mai.

== Geography ==
The province stretches from the upper plains of the Chao Phraya River valley, to forested mountains in the west. The Sakae Krang River, a tributary of the Chao Phraya River, is the main watercourse of in the province. The total forest area is 3,419 km^{2} (1,320 sq mi) or 51.4 percent of provincial area.
The Huai Kha Khaeng wildlife sanctuary, at the western boundary bordering Tak province, was declared a World Heritage Site in 1991. It is home to most of the forest animals of Southeast Asia, including tigers and elephants.
Huai Kha Kaeng wildlife sanctuary, along with one other wildlife sanctuary, make up region 12 (Nakhon Sawan) of Thailand's protected areas.

- Huai Kha Khaeng Wildlife Sanctuary, 2,780 km^{2} (1,070 sq mi)

Location protected area of Uthai Thani
Uthai Thani protected area: / Wildlife sanctuary; 1 / Huai Kha Khaeng

== History ==
Originally Mon and Lawa settled in the area. The first Thai settlement in the area was Muang U Thai during the Sukhothai Kingdom, but it was later abandoned when the river changed course. The Patabeut people, of Karen ethnicity, revived the settlement at its current site during the Ayutthaya Kingdom. It served as a fort protecting the boundary of the kingdom.

Uthai Thani is the hometown of the father of King Rama I. He later changed the city's old name Uthai to Uthai Thani.

In 1892, King Chulalongkorn (Rama V) added the area of Uthai Thani to the Monthon Nakhon Sawan and in 1898 formed the province.

== Symbols ==
The provincial seal depicts the pavilion at Wat Khao Sakae Krang. It houses the statue of Thongdee, the father of King Rama I and a Buddha footprint. The mountain in the background symbolizes the location of the pavilion on top of Khao Sakae Krang.

The provincial flower is the yellow cotton tree (Cochlospermum regium). The provincial tree is the neem (Azadirachta indica v. siamensis). Giant gourami (Osphronemus goramy) is the provincial aquatic animal.

The flag of Uthai Thani depicts the provincial seal of Uthai Thani in the middle. The yellow colour at the top of the flag is the colour of the Chakri dynasty, symbolizing gold. The green colour at the bottom is the colour of King Rama I as he was born on a Wednesday, which is associated with green in the Thai calendar. The text below the seal says Uthai Thani province.

== Administrative divisions ==
=== Provincial government ===
Map of eight districts

The province is divided into eight districts (amphoes). These are further divided into 70 subdistricts (tambons) and 642 villages (mubans).

1. Mueang Uthai Thani
2. Thap Than
3. Sawang Arom
4. Nong Chang
5. Nong Khayang
6. Ban Rai
7. Lan Sak
8. Huai Khot

=== Local government ===
As of 26 November 2019 there are: one Uthai Thani Provincial Administration Organisation (ongkan borihan suan changwat) and 14 municipal (thesaban) areas in the province. Uthai Thani has town (thesaban mueang) status. There are a further 13 subdistrict municipalities (thesaban tambon). The non-municipal areas are administered by 49 Subdistrict Administrative Organisations (SAO) (ongkan borihan suan tambon).

== Human achievement index 2022 ==
Health	Education	Employment	Income
42	46	49	51
Housing	Family	Transport	Participation
12	57	68	18
Uthai Thani province, with an HAI 2022 value of 0.6369 is "average", occupies place 44 in the ranking.

In 2003, United Nations Development Programme (UNDP) in Thailand began tracking progress on human development at the sub-national level using the Human achievement index (HAI), a composite index covering all the eight key areas of human development. National Economic and Social Development Council (NESDB) has taken over this task since 2017.

Rank	Classification
1 - 13	"high"
14 - 29	"somewhat high"
30 - 45	"average"
46 - 61	"somewhat low"
62 - 77	"low"

Map with provinces and HAI 2022 rankings
