= Thap Krit =

Coordinates: 5.7553946271°N 100.256861621°E

Thap Krit (Thai: ทับกฤช) is a tambon (subdistrict) in Chum Saeng district, Nakhon Sawan province, upper central Thailand.

== History and toponymy ==
The name Thap Krit consists of two elements. The first element Thap means crash (by car or train), the second element Krit is a person's name.

According to local stories. In the past, a man named Krit was killed by a train here. Locals therefore call this place Thap Ai Krit (ทับอ้ายกฤช, "Mr. Krit got clipped by a train"), after that, the name was only left Thap Krit as in the present.

Thap Krit was elevated from the Subdistrict Council to a Subdistrict Administrative Organization (SAO) on January 19, 1996.

== Geography ==
Thap Krit has a total area of 7,9312.5 rais (126.90 km^{2}), away from downtown Chum Saeng via Highway 225 for about 20 km (12.4 mi) and 21 km (13.0 mi) from the city of Nakhon Sawan.

The terrain is like a basin that receiving water from the north and east. During the rainy season (May–October) there will be deluges everywhere. There are no mountains or forests, because it is a wide plain area and cant down to Bueng Boraphet in the south.

The general topography is wetlands that are full of a wide variety of edible aquatic resources.

Adjoining subdistricts are, clockwise from the north, Phan Lan and Phai Sing in its district, Phanom Set in Tha Tako district, across the Bueng Boraphet, Kriangkrai in Mueang Nakhon Sawan district, and across the Nan river, Thap Krit Tai in its district.

== Administration ==
The entire area is under the administration of two government bodies; Thap Krit Subdistrict Administrative Organization and Thap Krit Subdistrict Municipality.

The subdistrict can also be divided into 19 administrative mubans (villages).

== Transportation ==
Thap Krit can be accessed by Highway 225 (Nakhon Sawan–Chaiyaphum route) from Bueng Boraphet T junction in the city of Nakhon Sawan.

The area is also served by the Thap Krit and Khlong Pla Kot railway stations of the State Railway of Thailand (SRT), whose northern line runs through neighbouring Thap Krit Tai.
