= Thap Krit Tai =

Thap Krit Tai ทับกฤชใต้
- Tambon
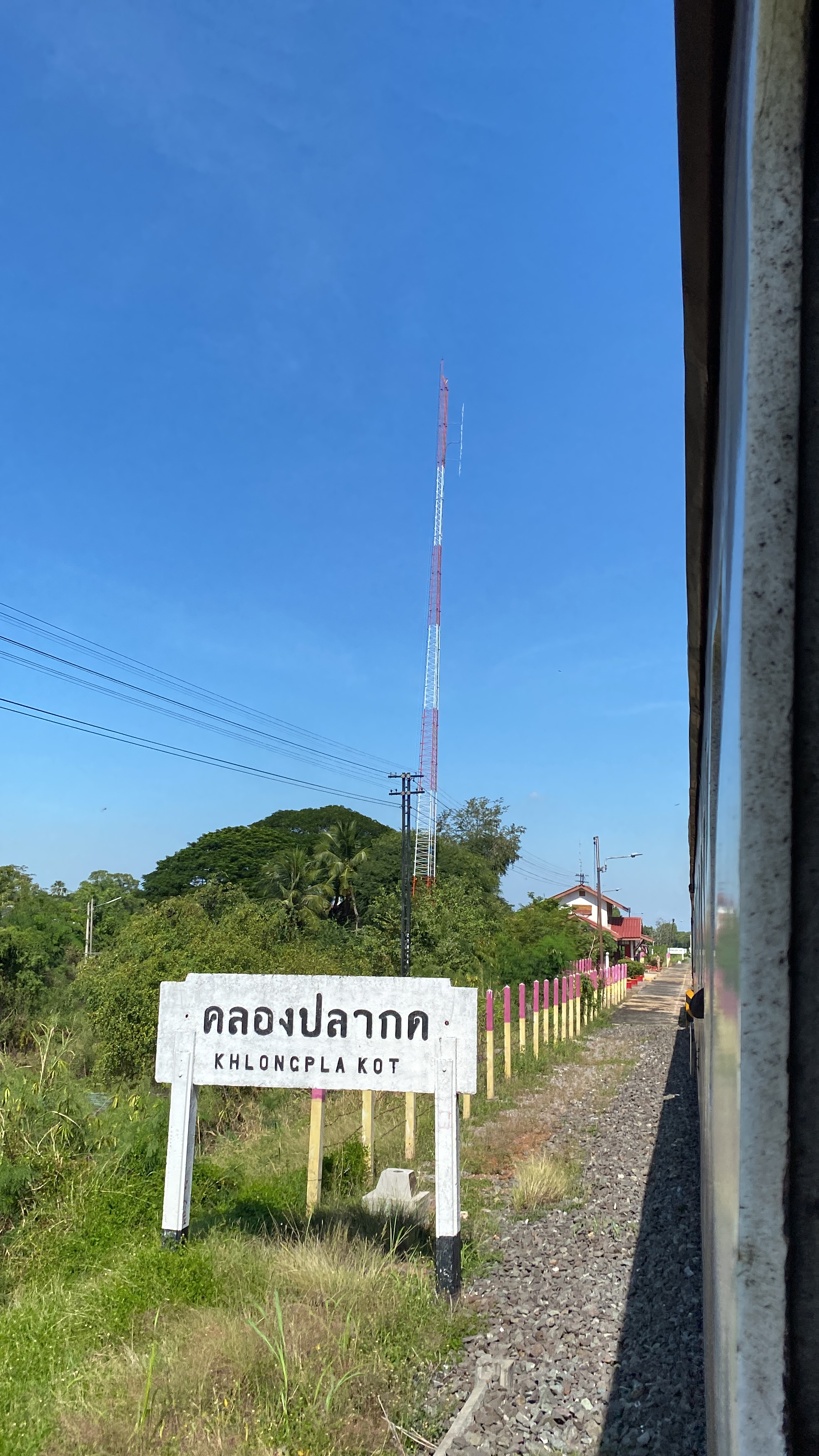
- Khlong Pla Kot railway station in 2022
- Etymology: "South Thap Krit"
- Interactive map of Thap Krit Tai
- Coordinates: 15°44′51.8″N 100°14′37.2″E
- Country: Thailand
- Province: Nakhon Sawan
- District: Chum Saeng
- Named for: Former Village

Government
  - Type: Subdistrict Administrative Organization (SAO)
  - Mayor: Wichian Chumjit

Area
  - Total: 31.54 km^{2} (12.18 sq mi)

Population
  - Total: 3,394
  - Density: 107.61/km^{2} (278.7/sq mi)
- Time zone: UTC+7 (ICT)
- Postcode: 60250
- Area code: (+66) 02
- Website: https://www.thapkrittai.go.th/home

Thap Krit Tai (Thai: ทับกฤชใต้) is a tambon (subdistrict) in Chum Saeng district, Nakhon Sawan province, Thailand.

== History ==
Originally, Thap Krit Tai (lit "south Thap Krit") was a muban (village) in Thap Krit subdistrict, which consists of Thap Krit Nuea ("north Thap Krit), Thap Krit Klang ("central Thap Krit"), and Thap Krit Tai.

Later in the year 1997, when there is a lot more population, therefore officially split into a subdistrict.

== Geography ==
Thap Krit Tai is a northern part of Nakhon Sawan province. It is located 21 km (13.0 mi) from downtown Chum Saeng and about 19 km (11.8 mi) from downtown Nakhon Sawan.

Nan river and Bueng Thap Krit Tai are important sources of water.

Neighbouring subdistricts are, clockwise from the north, Khok Mo and Thap Krit in its district, Kriangkrai and Bang Phra Luang in Mueang Nakhon Sawan district.

== Administration ==
=== Central administration ===
The entire area is under the administration of Subdistrict Administrative Organization (SAO) Thap Krit Tai.

The emblem of SAO Thap Krit Tai features paddy field and freshwater lake with mountains in the background inside the ears of rice frame.

=== Local administration ===
The area also consists of eight administrative villages.

No.	Name	Thai
1.	Ban Krit Thong	บ้านกฤชทอง
2.	Ban Yan Sawai	บ้านย่านสวาย
3.	Ban Map Chum Saeng Phatthana	บ้านมาบชุมแสงพัฒนา
4.	Ban Dong Sawat	บ้านดงสวาท
5.	Ban Khlong Sanuan	บ้านคลองสนวน
6.	Ban Don Sanuan	บ้านดอนสนวน
7.	Ban Thap Krit Tai	บ้านทับกฤชใต้
8.	Ban Tha Chang	บ้านท่าช้าง

== Transportation ==
Thap Krit Tai is served by the Thap Krit and Khlong Pla Kot railway stations of the State Railway of Thailand (SRT), whose northern line runs through the area.
