= Bueng Boraphet railway station =

Railway station in Kriangkrai, Thailand

Coordinates: 15.7243°N 100.2108°E

Bueng Boraphet บึงบอระเพ็ด
- Station in 2026

General information
- Location: Mu 3 (Ban Tha Din Daeng), Kriang Krai Subdistrict, Nakhon Sawan City
- Owner: State Railway of Thailand
- Line: Northern Line
- Platforms: 1
- Tracks: 2

Other information
- Station code: เพ.

History
- Opened: 9 October 1989

Services
| Preceding station | State Railway of Thailand | Following station |
|---|---|---|
| Pak Nam Pho towards Hua Lamphong or Krung Thep Aphiwat | Northern Line | Thap Krit towards Chiang Mai |
Location

Bueng Boraphet railway station is a railway station located in Kriang Krai Subdistrict, Mueang Nakhon Sawan District, Nakhon Sawan. It is located 257.200 km from Bangkok railway station and is a class 3 railway station. It is on the Northern Line of the State Railway of Thailand. The station is named after Bueng Boraphet, Thailand's largest freshwater swamp, of which the station is located near to.

The station opened on October 9th, 1989. It is the only station in Nakhon Sawan to use lever frame system.

== Gallery ==
Station building
