= Phanom Set =

Phanom Set พนมเศษ
- Subdistrict Administrative Organization
- Interactive map of Phanom Set
- Coordinates: 15°42′46.1″N 100°20′39.9″E
- Country: Thailand
- Province: Nakhon Sawan
- District: Tha Tako
- Named for: Khao Phanom Set

Government
  - Mayor: Nisa Jaiuea

Area
  - Total: 69.68 km^{2} (26.90 sq mi)

Population
  - Total: 5,036
  - Density: 27.90/km^{2} (72.27/sq mi)
- Time zone: UTC+7 (ICT)
- Postcode: 60160
- Area code: (+66) 02
- Website: https://www.phanomset.go.th/home

Phanom Set (Thai: พนมเศษ, pronounced [pʰā.nōm sèːt]) is a tambon (subdistrict) of Tha Tako District, Nakhon Sawan Province.

== History ==
Phanom Set separated from Phanom Rok in 1933. Its named "Phanom Set" after a mountain named "Khao Phanom Set" that stands prominently in the middle of the area.

== Geography ==
Phanom Set has a mostly flat terrain with Khao Phanom Set located in the middle of the area. In the rainy season, agricultural areas will be flooded and some villages in the dry season will lack water for farming.

Adjacent subdistricts are (from the north clockwise): Wang Yai in its district and Phai Sing in Chum Saeng District, Phanom Rok in its district, Wang Mahakon in its district, Thap Krit in Chum Saeng District.

It is about 25 km (15.5 mi) from downtown Tha Tako, with a total area of approximately 43,547 rai or approximately 69.68 square kilometers.

== Administration ==
Phanom Set is governed by the Subdistrict Administrative Organization (SAO) Phanom Set (อบต.พนมเศษ).

The area also consists of 11 administrative villages (muban).

| No. | Name | Thai |
|---|---|---|
| 1. | Ban Phanom Set Tai | บ้านพนมเศษใต้ |
| 2. | Ban Nong Chik Khong | บ้านหนองจิกโค้ง |
| 3. | Ban Krathum Chao | บ้านกระทุ่มเจ้า |
| 4. | Ban Khro Riangrai | บ้านคร่อเรียงราย |
| 5. | Ban Nong Khrok | บ้านหนองครก |
| 6. | Ban Phanom Set Nuea | บ้านพนมเศษเหนือ |
| 7. | Ban Hua Prik | บ้านหัวปริก |
| 8. | Ban Laem Krathum | บ้านแหลมกระทุ่ม |
| 9. | Ban Khlong Khut | บ้านคลองขุด |
| 10. | Ban Laem Prada | บ้านแหลมประดา |
| 11. | Ban Rang Bua Phatthana | บ้านรางบัวพัฒนา |

The emblem of SAO Phanom Set shows a Khao Phanom Set along with the ears of rice adorned as a frame.

== Demography ==
It has a total population of 5,036 people (2,432 men, 2,604 women) in 1,793 households.

== Economy ==
Most of the people in Phanom Set are engaged in agriculture, followed by employed.

Watermelon is an important local product.

== Utilities ==
Phanom Set has electricity for all 11 villages (except for some areas outside the electric service area using solar power). While tap water is only available in some villages (Ban Phanom Set Tai, Ban Khro Riangrai, Ban Hua Prik, Ban Khlong Khut).

There are four gas stations in total.

== Places ==
- Wat Phanom Set Tai
- Wat Phanom Set Nuea
- Khao Phanom Set Scenic Viewpoint
- Guanyin Shrine
