= Sermkhun Kunawong =

Thai businessman

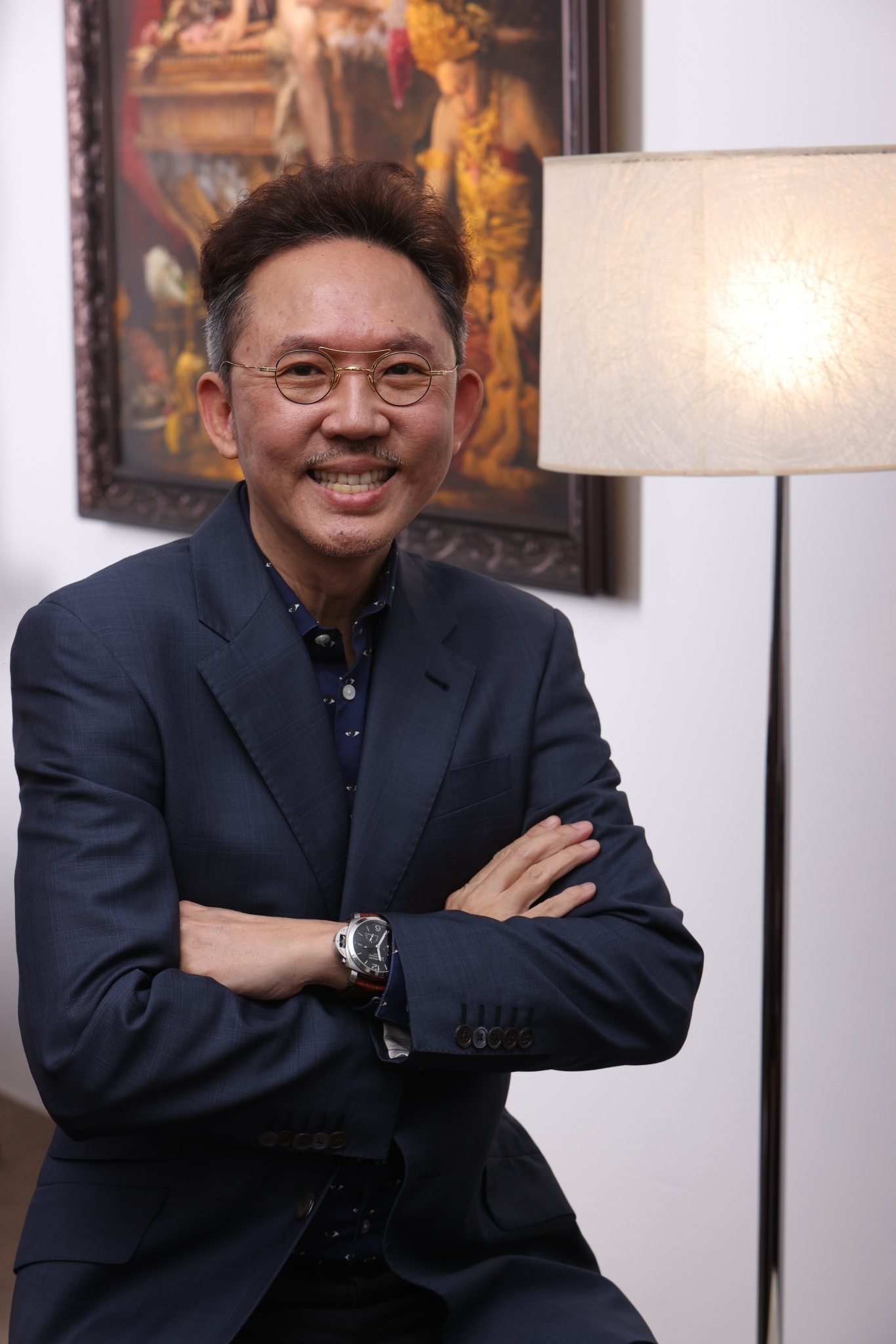

Sermkhun Kunawong or "Mr. Jok" is the founder and CEO of CMO PLC, a Thai creative and event management company. He is the founder and owner of the Bangkok Sculpture Center and a contemporary photographer, who has successfully hosted four solo photo exhibitions.

== Biography ==
Sermkhun was born on 5 July 1960 in Nakhon Sawan, Thailand. He attended Bodindecha (Sing Singhaseni) School and obtained a bachelor's degree in communication arts, Chulalongkorn University.

Sermkhun started his career as a freelance photographer, specialized in both still and motion pictures. In 1986, he established a company called "The Eyes". In 1990, he founded PM Center, aiming to become the biggest light and sound rental service provider in ASEAN.

In 1991, he established CM Organizer (or CMO Group) as an event management business. The company was listed in the stock market with registered capital of US$3.75 million in 2004, making it the first event company to be registered on the Stock Exchange of Thailand (SET). In 2011, it was renamed CMO Public Company Limited.

Beside his role as a businessperson, Sermkhun is also prominent in the Thai art scene. His passion for Thai modern art led to the establishment of the Bangkok Sculpture Center, which is the largest sculpture exhibition center in Thailand. On a four rai site, the center welcomes all interested visitors free of charge.
