= Chumsaeng railway station =

Railway station in Thailand

Coordinates: 15.8947°N 100.3100°E

Chumsaeng ชุมแสง
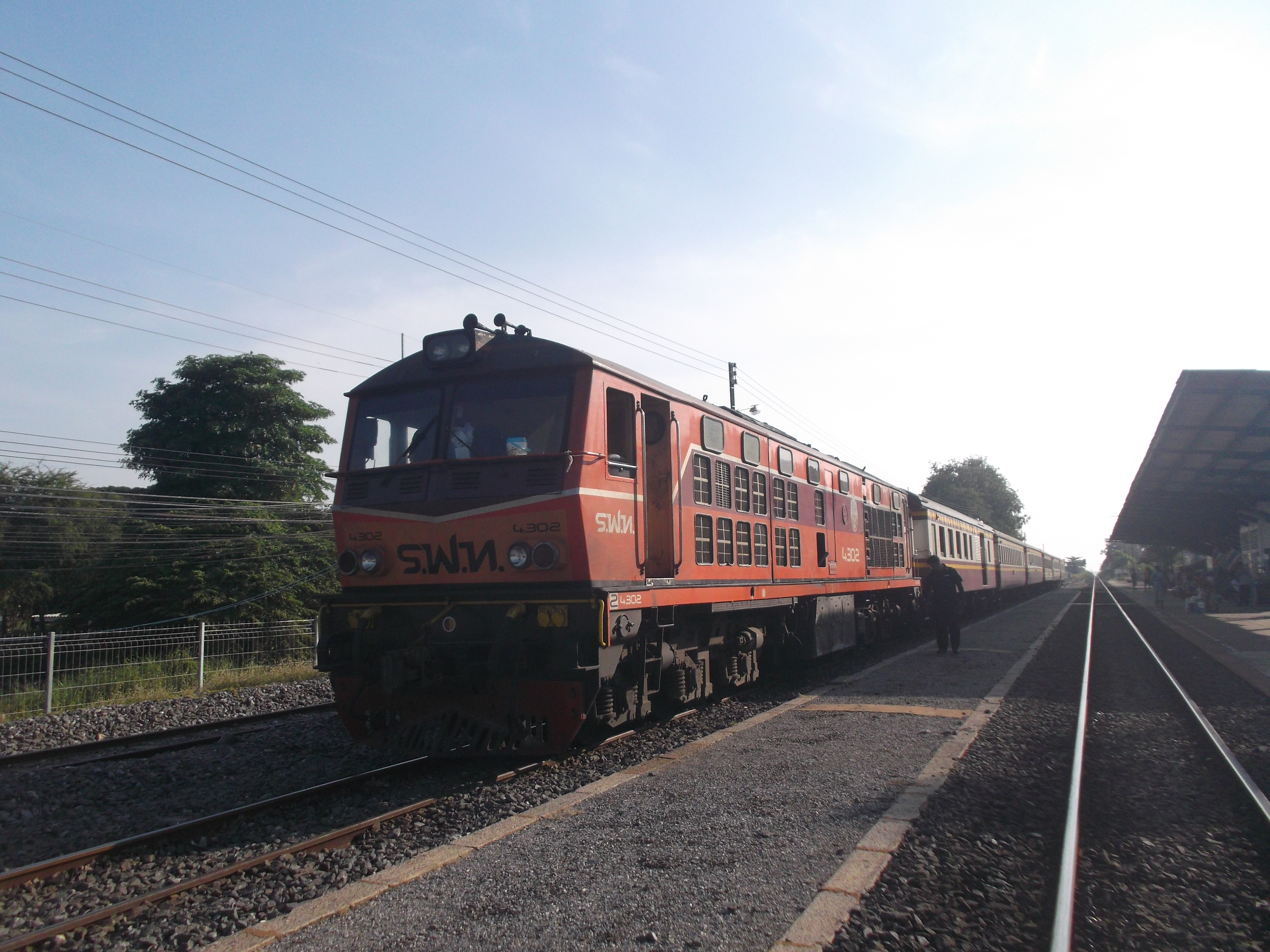
- Ordinary train No. 201 at Chumsaeng Station.

General information
- Location: Thesaban Phattana 1 Road, Chumsaeng Subdistrict, Chumsaeng District, Nakhon Sawan
- Owner: State Railway of Thailand
- Line: Northern Line
- Platforms: 2
- Tracks: 3

Other information
- Station code: ชส.

History
- Opened: 24 January 1908; 118 years ago

Services
Preceding station	State Railway of Thailand	Following station
Khlong Pla Kot towards Hua Lamphong or Krung Thep Aphiwat	Northern Line	Wang Krang towards Chiang Mai
Location

Chumsaeng railway station is a railway station located in Chumsaeng Subdistrict, Chumsaeng District, Nakhon Sawan. It is located 280.294 km from Bangkok railway station and is a class 1 railway station. It is on the Northern Line of the State Railway of Thailand. The station opened on 24 January 1908 as part of the Northern Line extension from Pak Nam Pho to Phitsanulok.
