= Pak Nam Pho =

Pak Nam Pho ปากน้ำโพ
- Tambon
- Interactive map of Pak Nam Pho
- Coordinates: 15°42′00.3″N 100°08′31.6″E
- Country: Thailand
- Province: Nakhon Sawan
- District: Mueang Nakhon Sawan

Government
  - Type: City Municipality
- Time zone: UTC+7 (ICT)
- Postcode: 60000
- Area code: (+66) 02
- Website: http://www.nsm.go.th

Pak Nam Pho (Thai: ปากน้ำโพ, pronounced [pàːk náːm pʰōː]) is a tambon (sub-district) in Mueang Nakhon Sawan District, Nakhon Sawan Province, upper central Thailand.

== Toponymy and history ==
Usually, the name Pak Nam Pho refers to Mueang Nakhon Sawan District, the capital district of Nakhon Sawan Province, though it is often used to mean the entire province. The name is believed to be a distortion of Pak Nam Phlo (ปากน้ำโผล่, lit. 'estuary emerges'), since this is the point where the Ping and Nan Rivers converge to form the Chao Phraya River, the main artery of central Thailand.

Another explanation suggests that Pho was once the old name of the Nan River, making Pak Nam Pho means "the mouth of the Nan River." The word Pak Nam (also spelled Paknam) itself means "estuary" or "river mouth." An older name for Pak Nam Pho was given by King Rama V, who called it Ban Yon Tawan (บ้านย้อนตะวัน), meaning "a settlement facing the morning sun." Locals are still sometimes referred to as Ban Chon Tawan (บ้านชอนตะวัน). In that period, despite being a town center, the area was still teeming with wildlife such as deer and tigers. Tigers were often reported to prey on deer and even domestic dogs.

Pak Nam Pho has long been home to large communities of ethnic Chinese immigrants, including Teochew, Hainanese, Hoklo, Cantonese, and Hakka. To this day, these groups have preserved many traditional cultural practices, such as folk music, which continues to be passed down through generations. The town is also renowned for hosting Thailand's grand Chinese New Year celebrations, lasting up to 12 consecutive days and nights.

== Administration ==
Pak Nam Pho is under the administration of Nakhon Sawan Municipality like other nearby sub-districts.
