= Pak Nam Pho railway station =

Railway station in Pak Nam Pho, Thailand

Coordinates: 15.7043°N 100.1538°E

Pak Nam Pho ปากน้ำโพ

General information
- Location: Pak Nam Pho Subdistrict, Nakhon Sawan City
- Owner: State Railway of Thailand
- Line: Northern Line
- Platforms: 2
- Tracks: 6

Other information
- Station code: ปพ.

History
- Opened: 31 October 1905; 120 years ago

Services
| Preceding station | State Railway of Thailand | Following station |
|---|---|---|
| Nakhon Sawan towards Hua Lamphong or Krung Thep Aphiwat | Northern Line | Bueng Boraphet towards Chiang Mai |
Location

Pak Nam Pho railway station is a railway station in the Pak Nam Pho Sub-district, Nakhon Sawan City, Nakhon Sawan Province. It is 250.559 km from Bangkok railway station and is a class 1 railway station. It is on the Northern Line of the State Railway of Thailand.

== History ==
The station opened on 31 October 1905 as part of the Northern Line extension from Lopburi to Pak Nam Pho. The line continued to Phitsanulok in 1908. Originally, the station served as the main railway station of Nakhon Sawan Province. Passengers arriving here would often continue their journey to the city center, commonly known as Pak Nam Pho, where the Pak Nam Pho Market is located. Since the station is situated on the east bank of the Nan River, while the city center lies at the confluence of the west bank of the Nan River and the Ping River, which later forms the Chao Phraya River, passengers had to take a diesel-powered ferry downstream for a short distance to reach the end of the Nan River. The boatmen navigated carefully due to the strong currents at this point before docking at Pak Nam Pho Market. However its main purpose was removed as the new railway station built at Nong Pling replaced its role. Today, the station acts as a rail yard, a railway maintenance centre, and a former junction for a freight line to Kamnansong Rice Mill.

Pak Nam Pho station is notable for its track layout, where the station building is located on the furthermost passing loop. Therefore, the station building is usually obstructed by the trains in the yard when viewing from the main line.

== Sub-divisions ==
These are the sub-divisions within the area of Pak Nam Pho railway station:

1. Pak Nam Pho Branch of Railcars Department
2. Railway Medical Team Office, Pak Nam Pho District
3. Railway Workers' Union, Pak Nam Pho Branch
