= Street to Kitchen =

Restaurant in Houston, Texas, U.S.

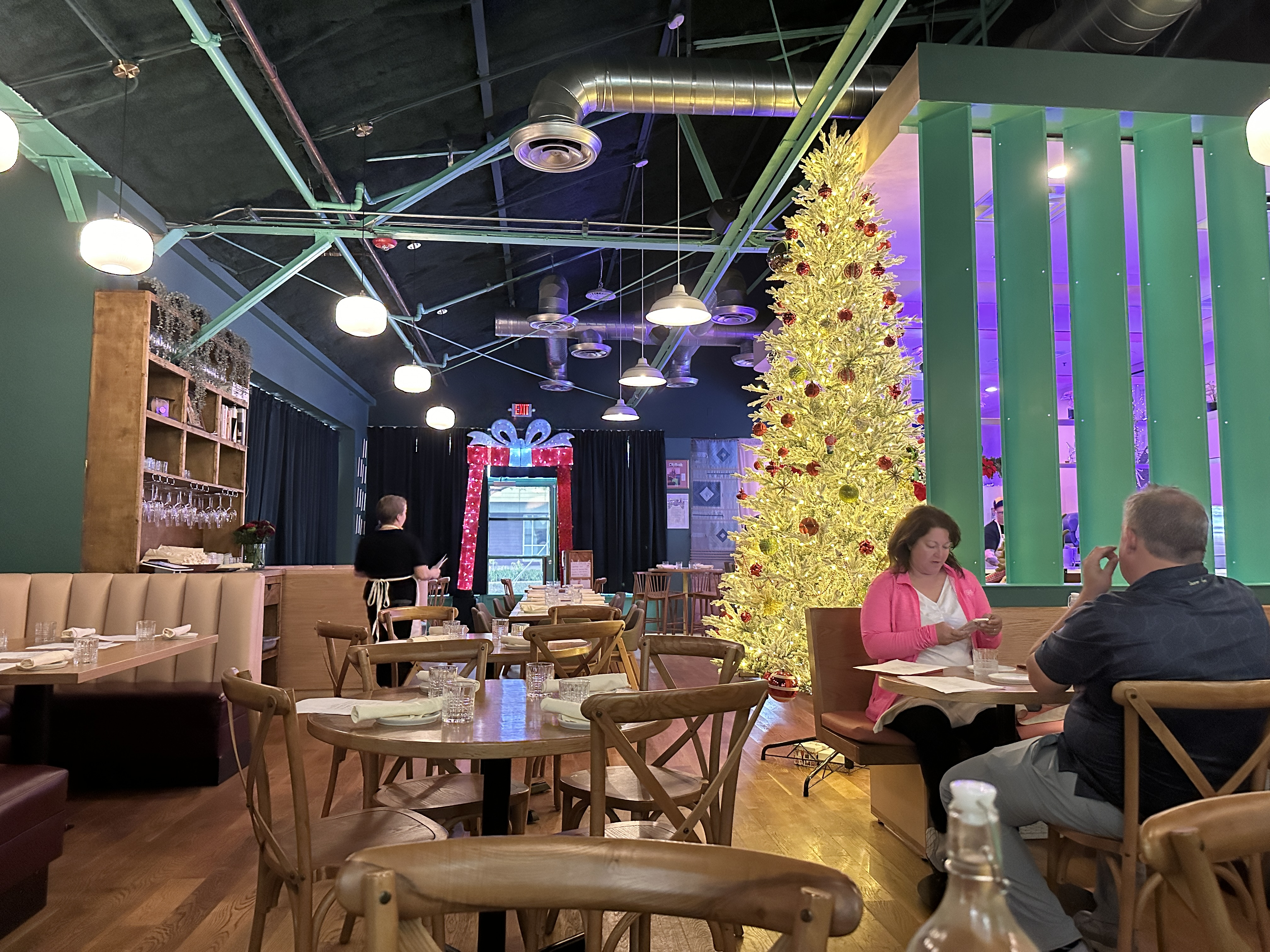
- Interior of Street to Kitchen at the 2023 location
- Interactive map of Street to Kitchen

Restaurant information
- Established: 2020
- Food type: Thai
- Location: 3401 Harrisburg Boulevard, Houston, Texas, United States
- Coordinates: 29.7488°N 95.3408°W

Street to Kitchen is a restaurant in Houston, in the U.S. state of Texas. Established in 2020, during the COVID-19 pandemic, the restaurant earned chef Benchawan Jabthong Painter a James Beard Foundation Award for Best Chef: Texas in 2023.

The restaurant moved in November 2023 to a larger space.

== See also ==
- James Beard Foundation Award: 2020s
- List of Michelin Bib Gourmand restaurants in the United States
- List of restaurants in Houston
