= Nakhon Sawan Airport =

Nakhon Sawan Airport ท่าอากาศยาน นครสวรรค์
- IATA: none; ICAO: VTPN

Summary
- Airport type: Public
- Location: Nakhon Sawan
- Elevation AMSL: 113 ft (34 m)
- Coordinates: 15°40′22″N 100°08′12″E

Map
- Location of airport in Thailand

Runways
| Direction | Length | | Surface |
| Direction | ft | m | Surface |
|---|---|---|---|
| 05/23 | 4,481 | 1,366 | Asphalt |

Nakhon Sawan Airport (ICAO: VTPN), is an airport in Nakhon Sawan, the capital city of Nakhon Sawan Province, Thailand.

== See also ==
•

== rnal links ==
- Nakhon Sawan travel guide from Wikivoyage
