= Koei Chai =

Sub-district in Chum Saeng, Thailand

Coordinates: 15°52′15.1″N 100°16′19.7″E

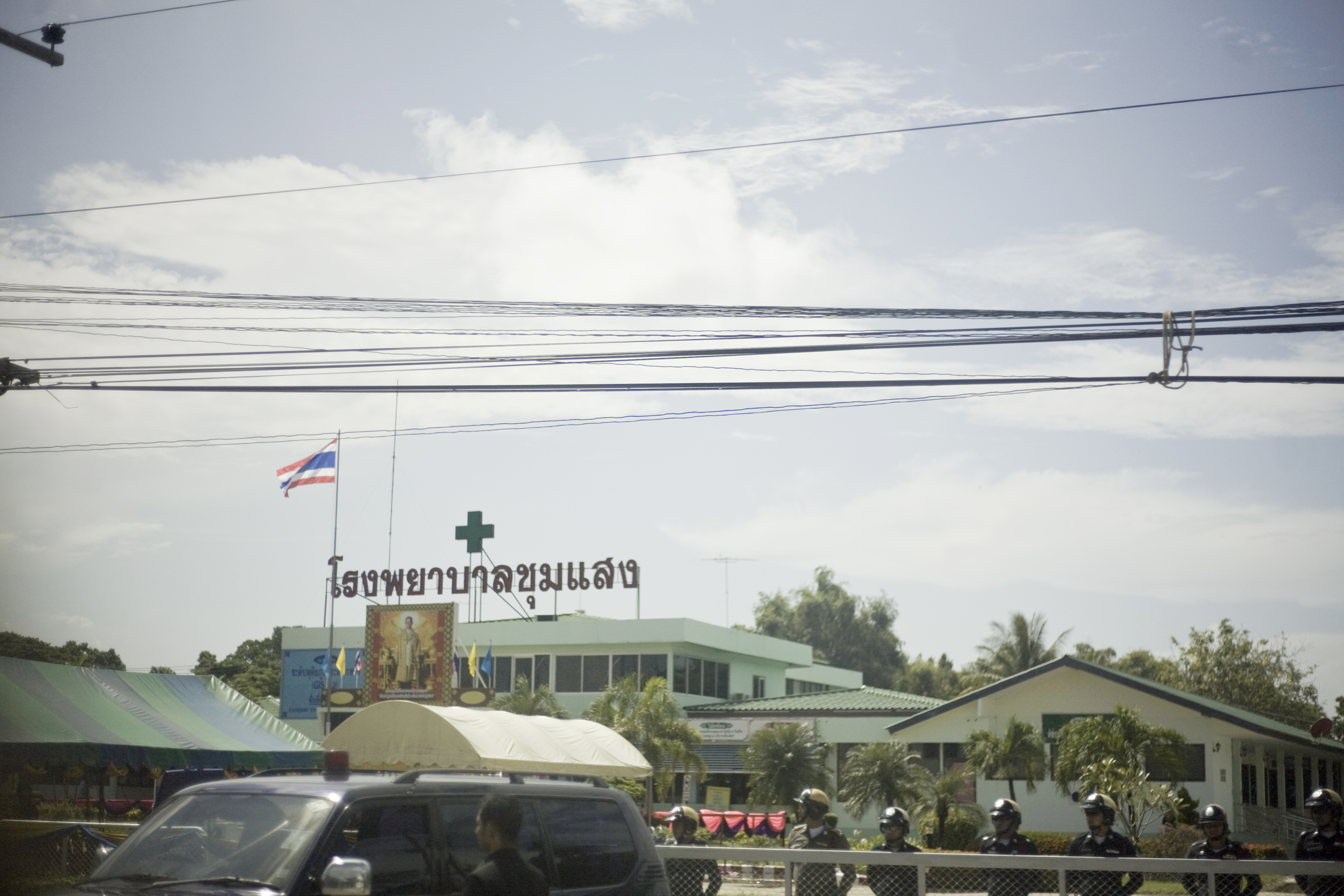
Chum Saeng Hospital

Koei Chai (Thai: เกยไชย, pronounced [kɤ̄ːj t͡ɕʰāj]) is a tambon (sub-district) of Chum Saeng District, Nakhon Sawan Province, upper central Thailand.

== History ==
Koei Chai dates back to the Ayutthaya period, at that time it was called "Koei Sai" (เกยทราย, literally: beached sand), which at the confluence of the Nan and Yom Rivers was the place where the hydraulic lime tanker falls in the reign of King Suriyenthrathibodi (Sanphet VIII), also known as Tiger King. At present, it is the location of Wat Koei Chai Neua, an ancient temple with a pagoda that contained the relics of Lord Buddha.

In the Thonburi period, King Taksin stopped his army here and was shot in the shin before retreating to the Thonburi Kingdom. Therefore is the source of his monument along the Nan River in downtown Chum Saeng today.

In the reign of King Chulalongkorn (Rama V) in Rattanakosin period, this district was also famous for its large man-eating crocodile, named "Ai Dang Koei Chai" (ไอ้ด่างเกยไชย), it was said that the body was so large that it can across from one side to the opposite side of Nan River. According to a short note, only two lines of Prince Damrong stated that its skull was very large and was preserved here, but at that time it had already been sold to a foreigner in Bangkok.

== Geography ==
Neighbouring tambons are (from the north clockwise): Chum Saeng, Phikun, Nong Krachao, Phikun, Khok Mo, Phan Lan, Phai Sing, Tha Mai, Phai Sing.

Koei Chai is also a place full of over 20,000 toddy palm trees, some of which are older than 300 years old.

== Administration ==
=== Central administration ===
Koei Chai subdivided into 16 administrative mubans (villages)

No.	Name	Thai
1.	Ban Lat Plang (Mu 1)	บ้านลาดปลัง (หมู่ 1)
2.	Ban Lat Plang (Mu 2)	บ้านลาดปลัง (หมู่ 2)
3.	Ban Koei Chai Nuea	บ้านเกยไชยเหนือ
4.	Ban Koei Chai (Mu 4)	บ้านเกยไชย (หมู่ 4)
5.	Ban Koei Chai (Mu 5)	บ้านเกยไชย (หมู่ 5)
6.	Ban Koei Chai Tai (Mu 6)	บ้านเกยไชยใต้ (หมู่ 6)
7.	Ban Koei Chai Tai (Mu 7)	บ้านเกยไชยใต้ (หมู่ 7)
8.	Ban Koei Chai Tai (Mu 8)	บ้านเกยไชยใต้ (หมู่ 8)
9.	Ban Koei Chai Tai (Mu 9)	บ้านเกยไชยใต้ (หมู่ 9)
10.	Ban Phai Lom	บ้านไผ่ล้อม
11.	Ban Nong Khang	บ้านหนองคาง
12.	Ban Tha Na	บ้านท่านา
13.	Ban Lat Plang (Mu 13)	บ้านลาดปลัง (หมู่ 13)
14.	Ban Koei Chai (Mu 14)	บ้านเกยไชย (หมู่ 14)
15.	Ban Lat Plang (Mu 15)	บ้านลาดปลัง (หมู่ 15)
16.	Ban Pho Nong Yao	บ้านโพธิ์หนองยาว

=== Local administration ===
Koei Chai is administered by the Subdistrict Administrative Organization (SAO) Koei Chai (องค์การบริหารส่วนตำบลเกยไชย), established in 1996.

== Places ==
- Wat Koei Chai Neua
- Wat Koei Chai Tai
- Chum Saeng Hospital

== Local products ==
Because it is a place that has a lot of toddy palm trees, the villagers therefore have a career in palm and processing products from these fruits

- Palm fruit sap
- Nam phrik (Thai chili paste)
