= Kao Liao district =

Kao Liao เก้าเลี้ยว
- District
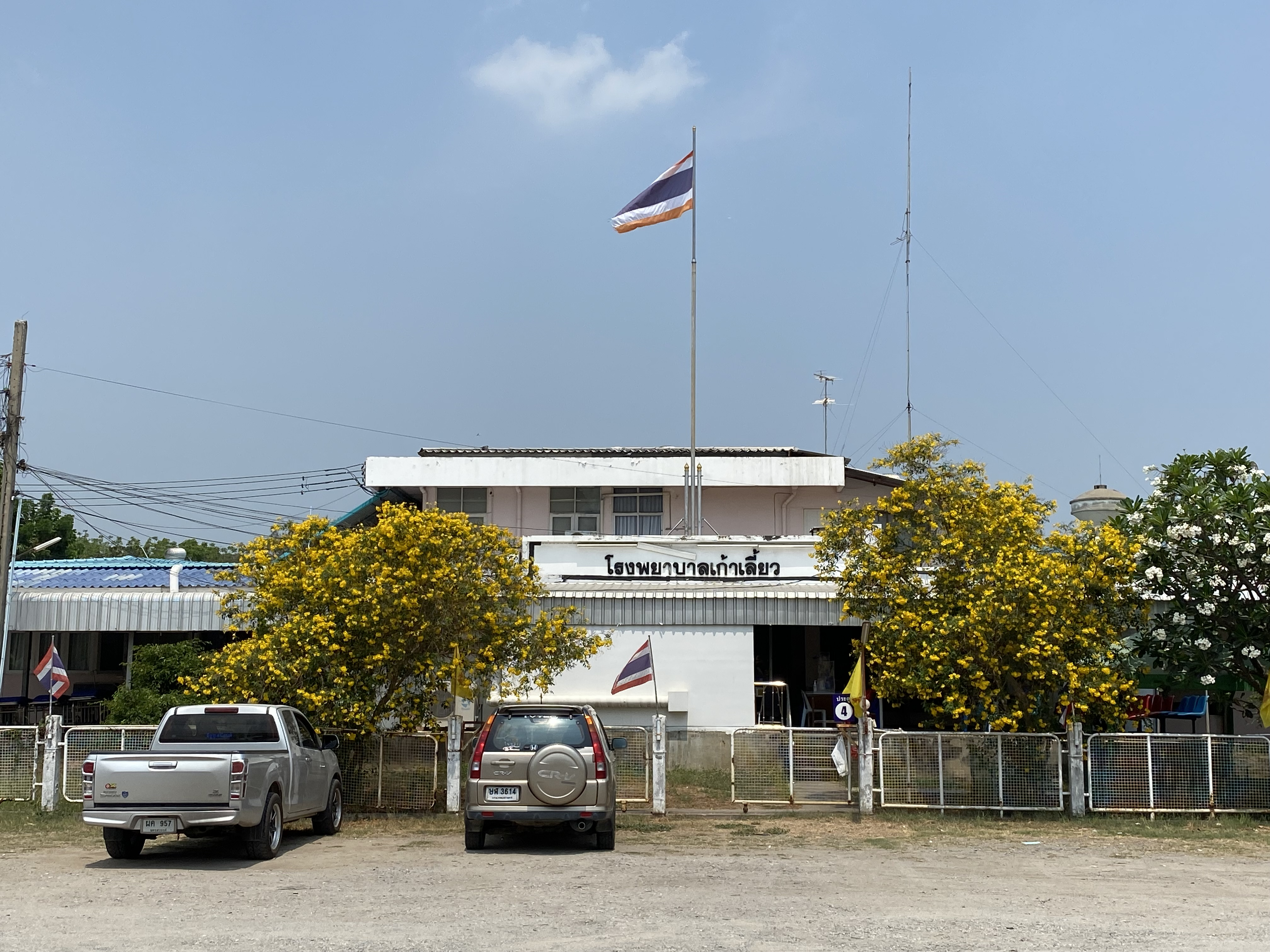
- Kao Liao Hospital

- District location in Nakhon Sawan province
- Coordinates: 15°51′1″N 100°4′43″E
- Country: Thailand
- Province: Nakhon Sawan
- Seat: Kao Liao

Area
  - Total: 256.73 km^{2} (99.12 sq mi)

Population (2013)
  - Total: 34,852
  - Density: 135.75/km^{2} (351.60/sq mi)
- Time zone: UTC+7 (ICT)
- Postal code: 60230
- Geocode: 6006

Kao Liao (Thai: เก้าเลี้ยว, pronounced [kâːw lía̯w]) is a district (amphoe) of Nakhon Sawan province, central Thailand.

== History ==
The minor district (king amphoe) was created on 1 October 1969, when five tambons were split off from Banphot Phisai district. It was upgraded to a full district on 28 June 1973.

== Geography ==
Neighboring districts are (from the north clockwise): Banphot Phisai of Nakhon Sawan province; Pho Thale of Phichit province; Chum Saeng and Mueang Nakhon Sawan of Nakhon Sawan.

== Administration ==
The district is divided into five sub-districts (tambons), which are further subdivided into 44 villages (mubans). Kao Liao is a township (thesaban tambon) which covers the whole tambon Kao Liao. There are a further four tambon administrative organizations (TAO) in the district.

No.	Name	Thai name	Villages	Pop.
1.	Maha Phot	มหาโพธิ	5	5,986
2.	Kao Liao	เก้าเลี้ยว	5	4,988
3.	Nong Tao	หนองเต่า	10	6,922
4.	Khao Din	เขาดิน	12	7,149
5.	Hua Dong	หัวดง	12	9,798
