= Benchawan Jabthong Painter =

American Chef

- Born: 1993 or 1994 (age 32–33)
- Spouse: Graham Painter
- Culinary career
- Cooking style: Thai street food
- Current restaurants: Street to Kitchen; ThPrsv at eculent Jantra
- Award won: Best Chef/Texas 2023 James Beard Awards
- Website: Street to Kitchen

Benchawan Jabthong Painter is a chef and restaurateur in Houston, Texas. In 2023 she was named Best Chef/Texas by the James Beard Foundation.

Painter was raised in Nakhon Sawan, Thailand and learned to cook in her grandmother's restaurant there, starting at age 6. She worked in Bangkok restaurants before meeting her husband and moving to the United States with him.

Painter moved to Houston in 2015. She worked at SaltAir and at Justin Yu's Theodore Rex; missing food from Thailand that wasn't adjusted for American tastes, she started opening popups.

Painter and her husband, Graham Painter, opened Street to Kitchen, a restaurant serving Thai street food, in Houston's Greater East End neighborhood in 2020. The couple also co-owns Th Prsrv in Kemah, Texas.

== See also ==
- List of people from Houston
