= Wat Koei Chai Nuea (Borommathat) =

Historic temple in Koei Chai, Thailand

Coordinates: 15°52′12″N 100°16′12″E

- วัดเกยไชยเหนือ (บรมธาตุ)
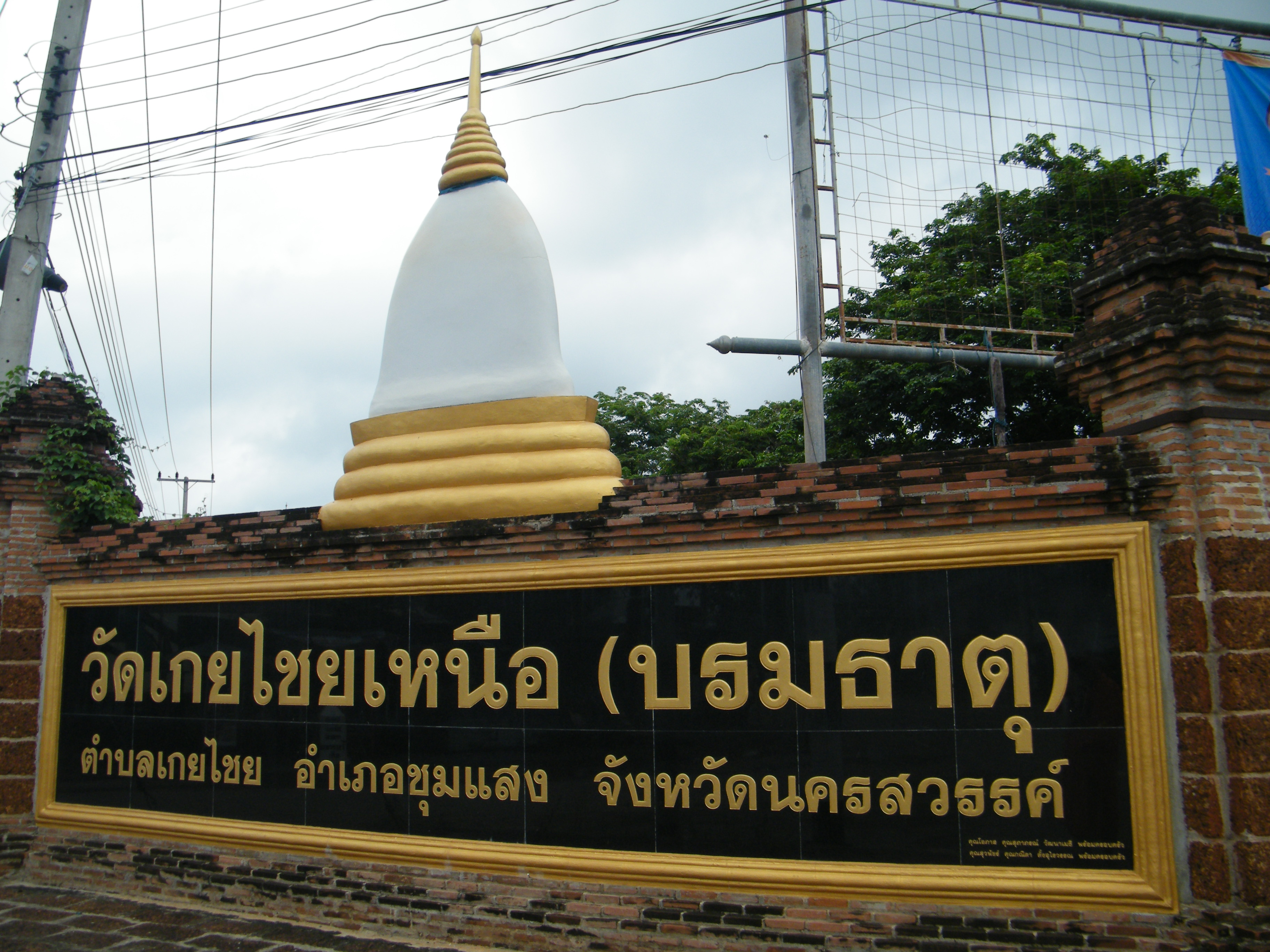
- Sign of the temple

- Location within Thailand

Religion
- Affiliation: Buddhism
- Sect: Theravāda, Mahānikāya

Location
- Location: Mu 4, Koei Chai Sub-district, Chum Saeng District, Nakhon Sawan Province
- Country: Thailand
- Interactive map of Wat Koei Chai Nuea (Borommathat)

Wat Koei Chai Nuea (Borommathat) (Thai: วัดเกยไชยเหนือ (บรมธาตุ)), or simply Wat Koei Chai Nuea (วัดเกยไชยเหนือ), is an old temple and historical site in Koei Chai Sub-district, Chum Saeng District, Nakhon Sawan Province upper central Thailand. It is located on the bank of the Yom River, where the confluence of rivers Yom and Nan.

The temple dates back to the reign of King Suriyenthrathibodi (Sanphet VIII) of Ban Phlu Luang Dynasty in the late Ayutthaya period. Its original name is Wat Tha Borommathat (วัดท่าบรมธาตุ). In the temple is an ancient pagoda built in the Sukhothai period, it is contained the Lord Buddha's relics and there are museums designed accordingly to Thai style to display potteries, old televisions, irons, old notes, old coins, guns, products made of glass and other ancient utensils.

Another interesting thing here is museum of the giant king crocodile "Phaya Dang Koei Chai" (พญาด่างเกยไชย), the place to display the legendary giant crocodile statue named "Ai Dang Koei Chai" (ไอ้ด่างเกยไชย), whose name is the origin of the name of Kei Chai Sub-District. It is believed to be a real crocodile in the reign of King Chulalongkorn (Rama V) of Rattanakosin period, according to the records of Prince Damrong Rajanubhab. The statue has a body size of 7.60 m (24 ft) in width, 44 m (144 ft) in length and 6.30 m (20 ft) in height. It is currently the largest crocodile statue in Thailand and probably the largest in the world. Inside the statue is a place for worship, for meditation and the showcases for stuffed crocodiles as well as information about the ethnicity of the all crocodiles . This purpose is for education to the young generation, and for the general public to use as the resource of study.
