= Tha Tako district =

Tha Tako ท่าตะโก
- District
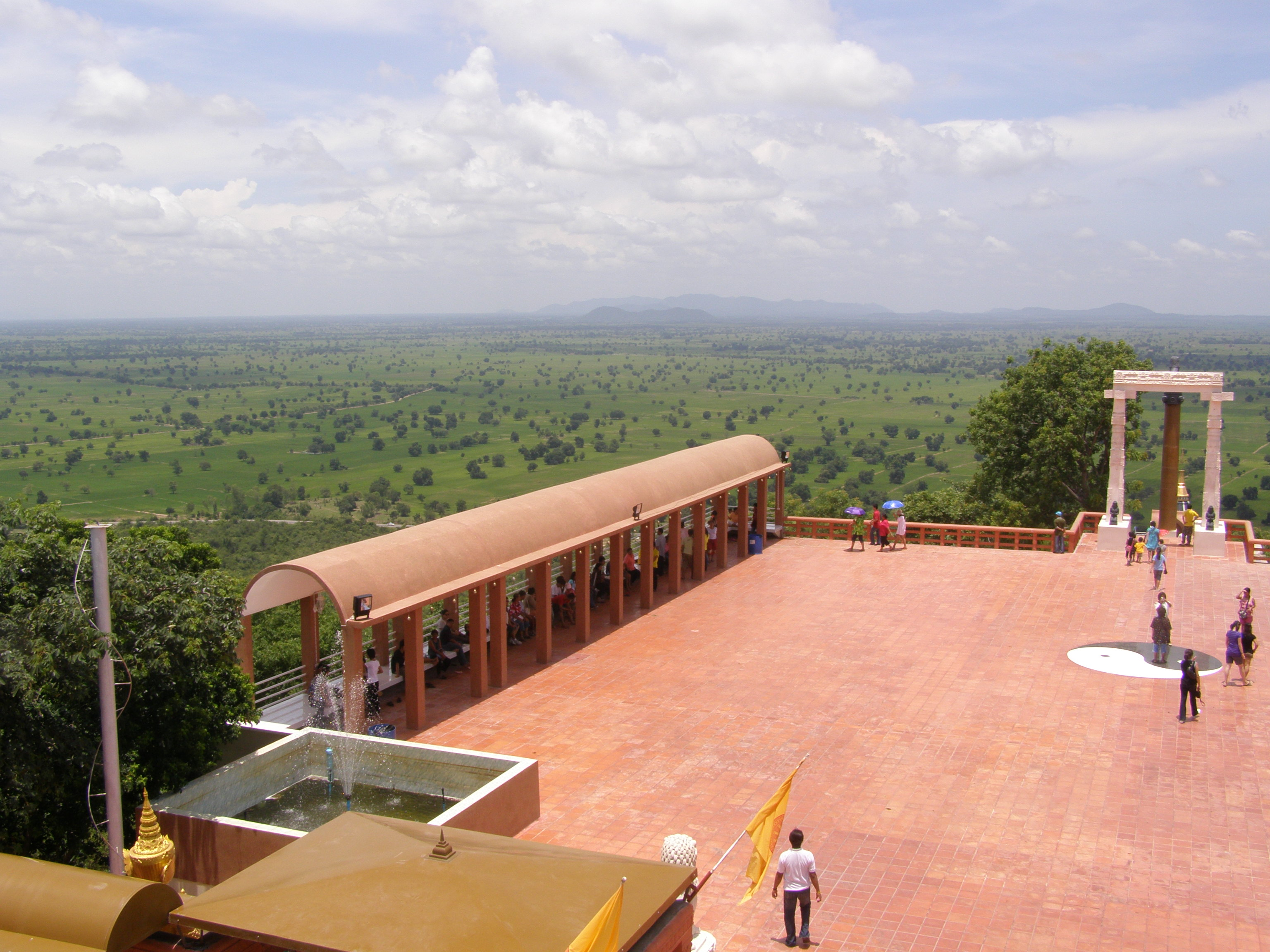
- View from Wat Pa Siriwattanawisuth

- District location in Nakhon Sawan province
- Coordinates: 15°38′30″N 100°28′57″E
- Country: Thailand
- Province: Nakhon Sawan

Area
  - Total: 607.2 km^{2} (234.4 sq mi)

Population (2005)
  - Total: 69,160
  - Density: 113.9/km^{2} (295.0/sq mi)
- Time zone: UTC+7 (ICT)
- Postal code: 60160
- Geocode: 6008

Tha Tako (Thai: ท่าตะโก, pronounced [tʰâː tā.kōː]) is a district (amphoe) in the eastern part of Nakhon Sawan province, central Thailand.

== History ==
The district was established at Ban Khao Noi, Tambon Tha Tako, in 1900. At first there was confusion whether the name was Khao Noi or Don Kha. It got its official name Tha Tako in 1917.

In the past, the people in the district used to visit a substantial river pier (in Thai tha) to bathe and give water to their cattle. At that pier several big Tako trees (Diospyros sp.) grew, so that pier was called Tha Tako.

== Geography ==
Neighbouring districts are (from the north clockwise): Nong Bua, Phaisali, Tak Fa, Phayuha Khiri, Mueang Nakhon Sawan, and Chum Saeng.

== Administration ==
The district is divided into 10 sub-districts (tambons), which are further subdivided into 109 villages (mubans). Tha Tako is a township (thesaban tambon) which covers parts of tambon Tha Tako. There are a further 10 tambon administrative organizations (TAO) in the district.

No.	Name	Thai name	Villages	Pop.
1.	Tha Tako	ท่าตะโก	7	9,397
2.	Phanom Rok	พนมรอก	13	6,556
3.	Hua Thanon	หัวถนน	10	8,251
4.	Sai Lamphong	สายลำโพง	16	8,193
5.	Wang Mahakon	วังมหากร	11	6,657
6.	Don Kha	ดอนคา	17	12,167
7.	Thamnop	ทำนบ	6	3,799
8.	Wang Yai	วังใหญ่	9	2,585
9.	Phanom Set	พนมเศษ	10	5,407
10.	Nong Luang	หนองหลวง	10	6,148
