= Thap Krit railway station =

Railway station in Thailand

Coordinates: 15.7552°N 100.2575°E

Thap Krit ทับกฤช
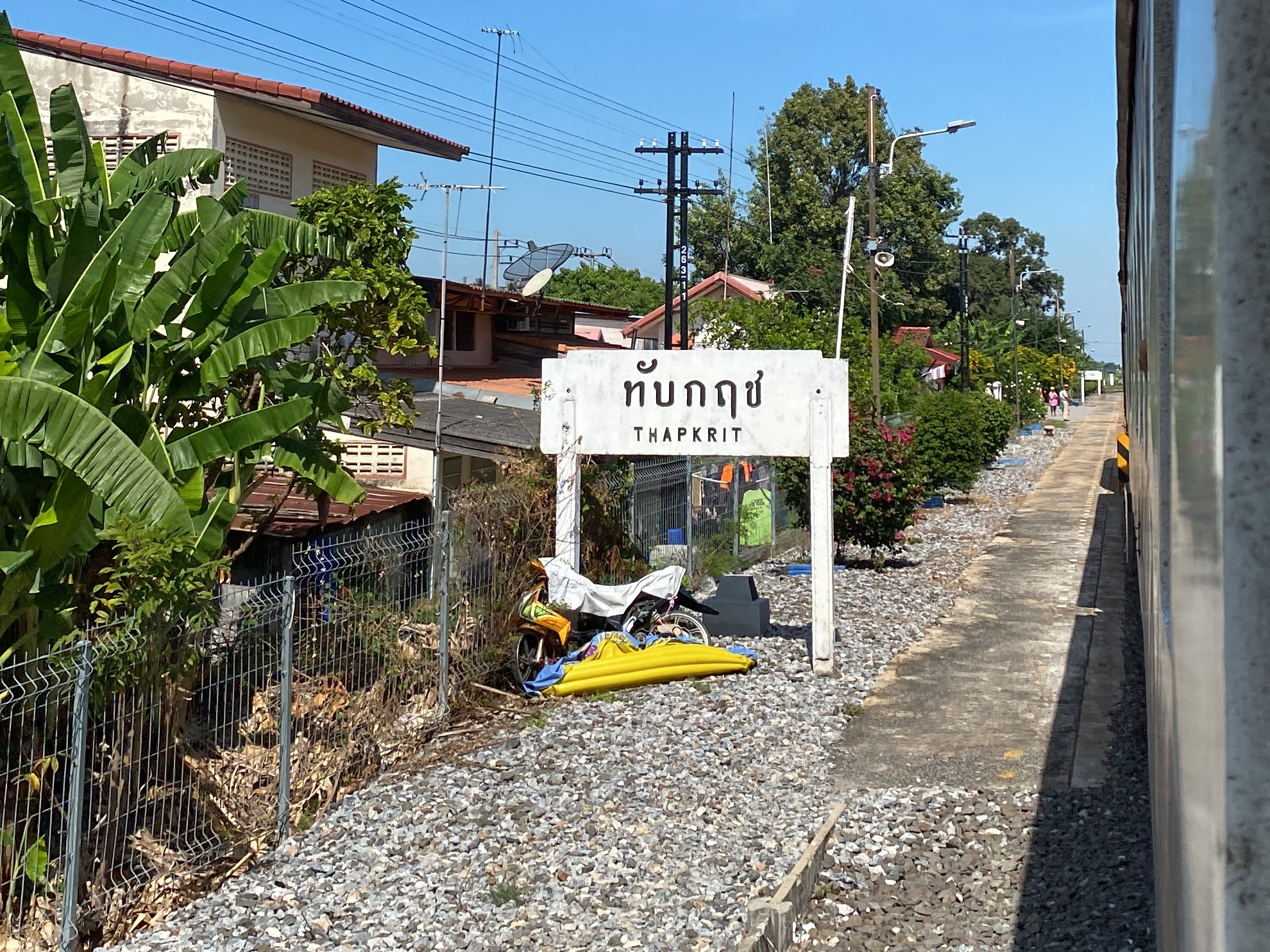
- The station in 2022

General information
- Location: Thap Krit Subdistrict, Chumsaeng District, Nakhon Sawan
- Owner: State Railway of Thailand
- Line: Northern Line
- Platforms: 1
- Tracks: 3

Other information
- Station code: ทก.

History
- Opened: 24 January 1908

Services
Preceding station	State Railway of Thailand	Following station
Bueng Boraphet towards Hua Lamphong or Krung Thep Aphiwat	Northern Line	Khlong Pla Kot towards Chiang Mai
Location

Thap Krit railway station is a railway station located in Tha Krit Subdistrict, Chumsaeng District, Nakhon Sawan. It is located 263.687 km from Bangkok railway station and is a class 2 railway station. It is on the Northern Line of the State Railway of Thailand. The station opened on 24 January 1908 as part of the Northern Line extension from Pak Nam Pho to Phitsanulok.
