= Chum Saeng district =

Chum Saeng ชุมแสง
- District
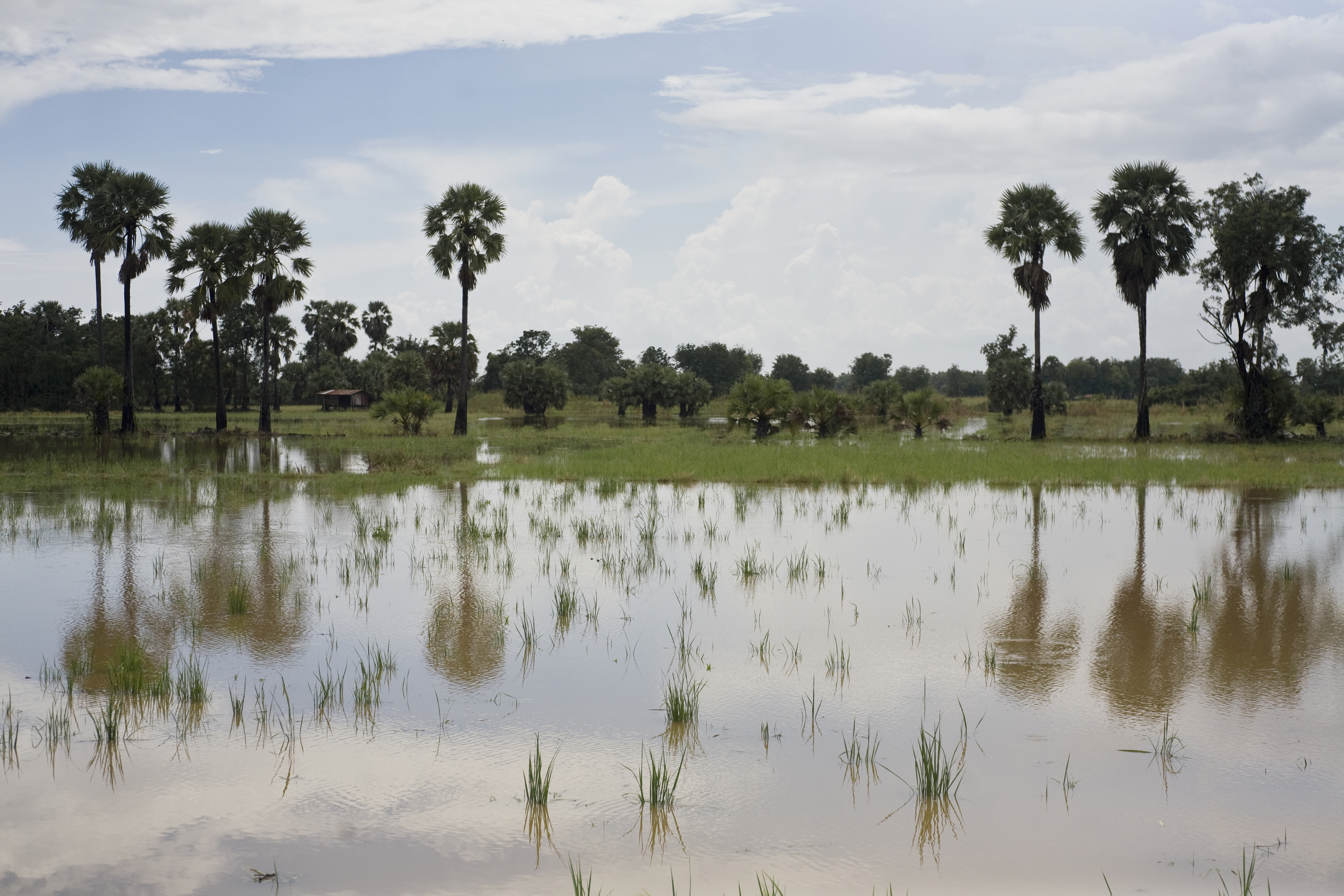
- Asian palmyra palms and rice field, Koei Chai, Chum Saeng on October 17, 2009

- District location in Nakhon Sawan province
- Coordinates: 15°52′52″N 100°18′9″E
- Country: Thailand
- Province: Nakhon Sawan

Area
  - Total: 716.762 km^{2} (276.743 sq mi)

Population (2005)
  - Total: 67,489
  - Density: 94.158/km^{2} (243.87/sq mi)
- Time zone: UTC+7 (ICT)
- Postal code: 60150
- Geocode: 6003

Chum Saeng (Thai: ชุมแสง, pronounced [t͡ɕʰūm sɛ̌ːŋ]) is a district (amphoe) in Nakhon Sawan province, upper central Thailand.

== History ==
Chum Saeng is an old district of Nakhon Sawan. The government separated some parts of Mueang Nakhon Sawan district to establish Tambon Koei Chai. In 1903, the Interior ministry upgraded the tambon to Phan Lan District, named after the central tambon. A few years later, the name was changed back to Koei Chai. The district office was moved to the west bank of the Nan River and renamed to Chum Saeng in 1915.

The name Chum Saeng in Thai is the name of a herb tree that look like Chaeng trees (ต้นแจง) (Maerua siamensis (Kurz) Pax.). Another possible origin of the name may date back to the reign of King Taksin, when in the area was a weapons warehouse, named Khlang Saeng (คลังแสง) in Thai.

Chum Saeng's ethnic group includes the Tai Dam, who reside in Ban Phai Sing, Phai Sing Sub-district.

During the reign of King Rama V, Chum Saeng was regarded as a Sino Thai community and served as a major center of the rice trade along the waterways. This was because it lies at the confluence of the Nan and Yom Rivers, with the northern railway line also passing through. Chum Saeng reached its peak of activity during the 1960s–70s. At that time, the town was still filled with gold shops, and trains were the preferred mode of travel. However, with the expansion of road networks, both river and rail transport gradually declined, leading to the district's reduced importance over time.

== Geography ==
Neighboring districts are (from the north clockwise): Pho Thale and Bang Mun Nak of Phichit province, Nong Bua, Tha Tako, Mueang Nakhon Sawan and Kao Liao of Nakhon Sawan Province.

Chum Saeng is about 39 km (24 mi) from Mueang Nakhon Sawan.

== Administration ==
The district is divided into 12 sub-districts (tambons), which are further subdivided into 131 villages (mubans). Chum Saeng is a town (thesaban mueang) covering tambon Chum Saeng. Thap Krit is a township (thesaban tambon) covering parts of the same-named tambon. There are a further 11 tambon administrative organizations (TAO).

No.	Name	Thai name	Villages	Pop.
1.	Chum Saeng	ชุมแสง	-	9,816
2.	Thap Krit	ทับกฤช	19	9,614
3.	Phikun	พิกุล	10	3,402
4.	Koei Chai	เกยไชย	17	7,834
5.	Tha Mai	ท่าไม้	15	8,207
6.	Bang Khian	บางเคียน	14	5,121
7.	Nong Krachao	หนองกระเจา	14	4,508
8.	Phan Lan	พันลาน	8	4,362
9.	Khok Mo	โคกหม้อ	8	4,420
10.	Phai Sing	ไผ่สิงห์	10	3,101
11.	Khamang	ฆะมัง	8	3,842
12.	Thap Krit Tai	ทับกฤชใต้	8	3,262

== Economy ==
Asian palmyra palm (Borassus flabellifer L.) is an important industrial crop of the district. Approximately 24,000 palm trees are planted throughout the area, some of which are hundreds of years old.

== Transportation ==
The district is served by the three railway stations, Thap Krit, Khlong Pla Kot, and Chum Saeng of the State Railway of Thailand (SRT).

There is also a minibus service from Mo Chit 2 Station in Bangkok to Chum Saeng. The minibus terminal is behind the Chum Saeng railway station near Chum Saeng Old Market.

== Tourism ==
At present, Chum Saeng has managed to preserve much of its old-town character, making it well-suited for cultural tourism. The district offers many attractions, such as the Chum Saeng Old Market, which is over 100 years old, the Chum Saeng Railway Station, a classic station and the last stop in Nakhon Sawan before entering Phichit, Wat Koei Chai Neua, the King Taksin Statue on the bank of the Nan River, Hiran Narumit Bridge, and the Chao Pho–Chao Mae Chum Saeng Shrine, among others.

Chum Saeng also served as the backdrop for Channel 3's hit 2019 TV drama Krong Kam, which boosted the district's profile and attracted visitors ranging from fans of the series to the general public.
