= Khlong Pla Kot railway station =

Railway station in Thailand

Coordinates: 15.8152°N 100.2834°E

Khlong Pla Kot คลองปลากด
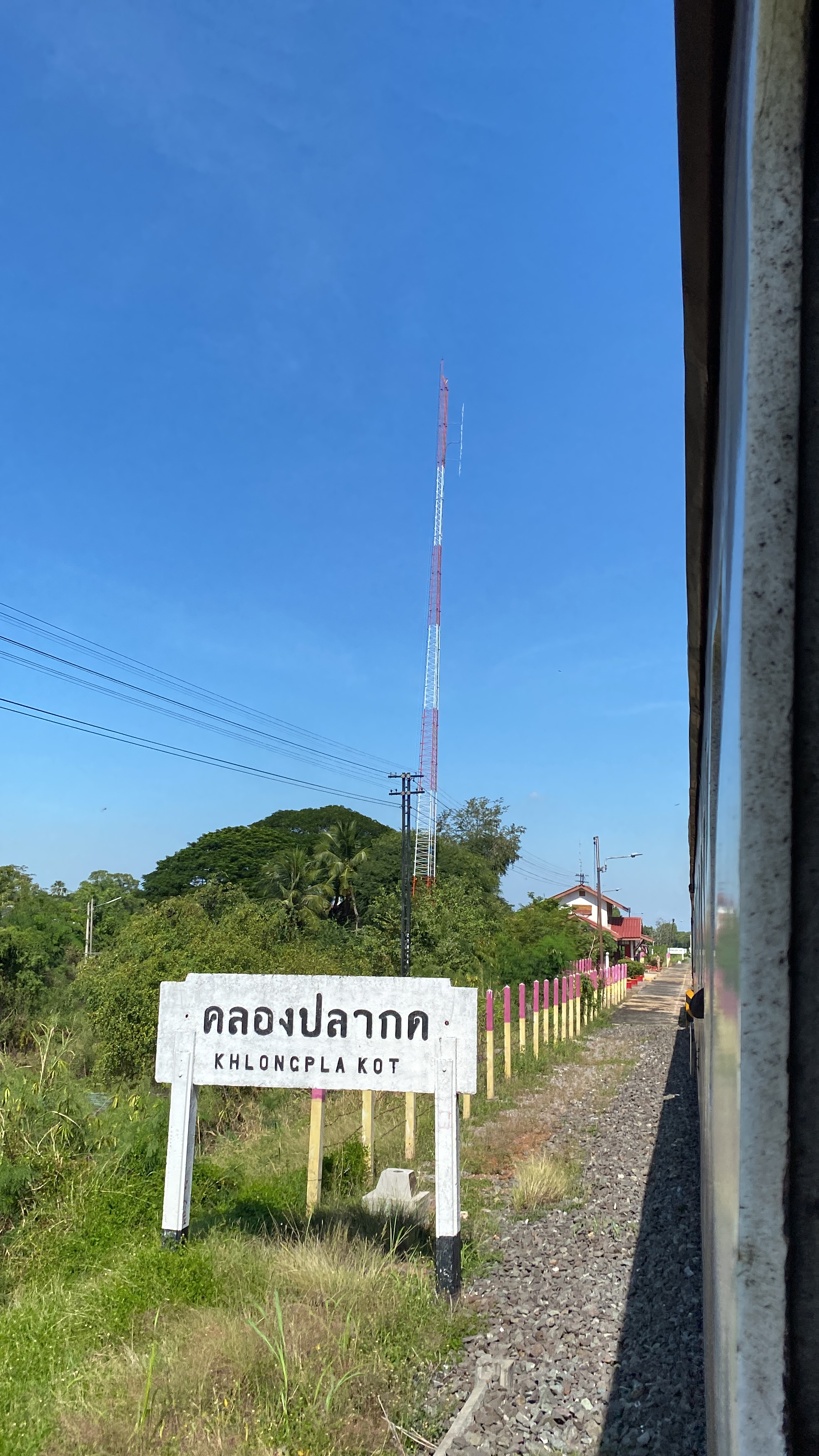
- Khlong Pla Kot railway station sign

General information
- Location: Ban Khlong Pla Kot Nai, Thap Krit Subdistrict, Chumsaeng District, Nakhon Sawan
- Owner: State Railway of Thailand
- Line: Northern Line
- Platforms: 1
- Tracks: 2

Other information
- Station code: ปก.

Services
Preceding station	State Railway of Thailand	Following station
Thap Krit towards Hua Lamphong or Krung Thep Aphiwat	Northern Line	Chumsaeng towards Chiang Mai
Location

Khlong Pla Kot railway station is a railway station located in Thap Krit Subdistrict, Chumsaeng District, Nakhon Sawan. It is located 270.873 km from Bangkok railway station and is a class 3 railway station. It is on the Northern Line of the State Railway of Thailand.
