= Mueang Nakhon Sawan district =

Mueang Nakhon Sawan เมืองนครสวรรค์
- District
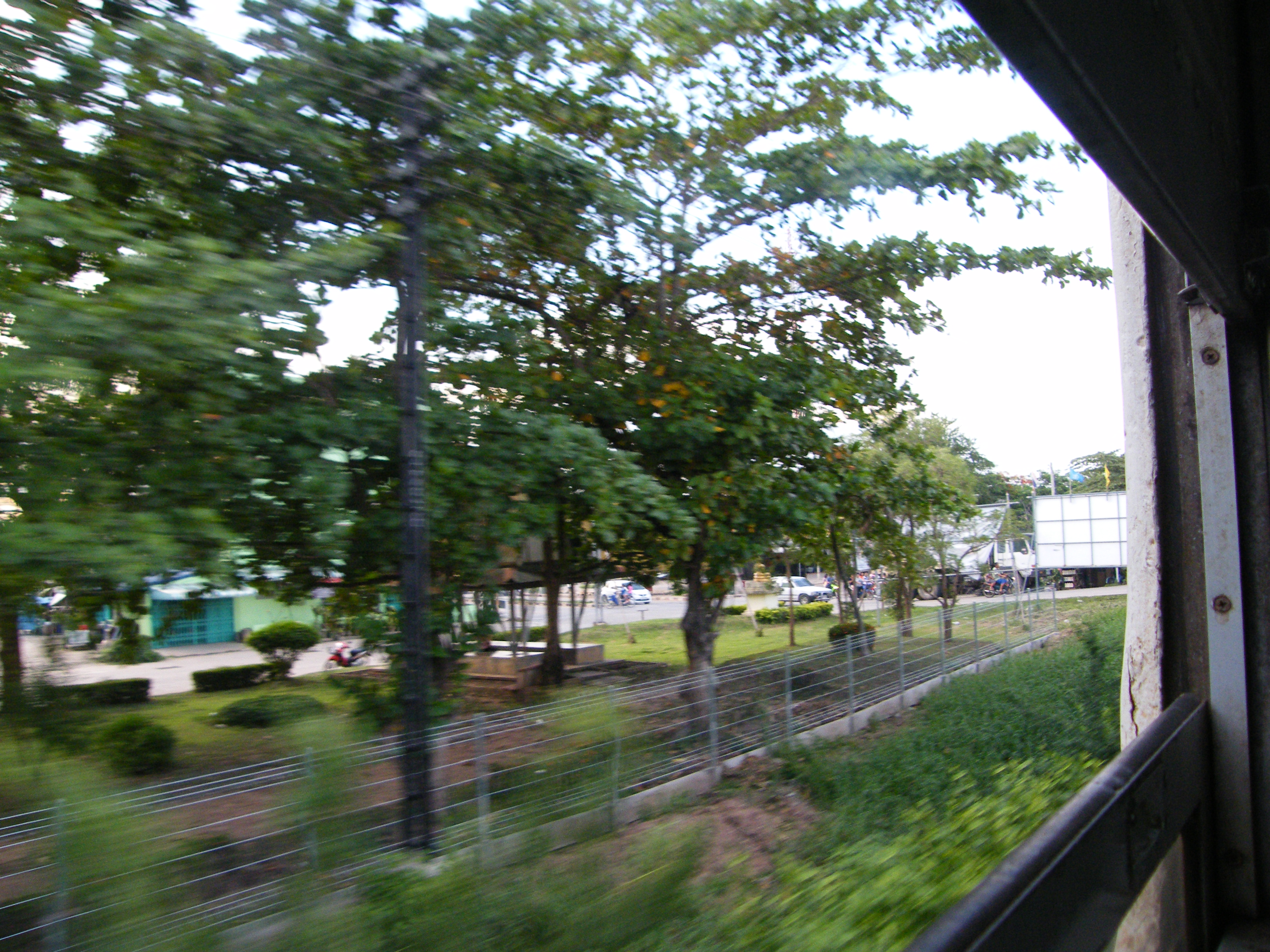
- Nong Pling, Mueang Nakhon Sawan seen from train window

- District location in Nakhon Sawan province
- Coordinates: 15°42′18″N 100°8′15″E
- Country: Thailand
- Province: Nakhon Sawan
- Seat: Pak Nam Pho

Area
  - Total: 748.27 km^{2} (288.91 sq mi)

Population (2015)
  - Total: 243,842
  - Density: 325.87/km^{2} (844.01/sq mi)
- Time zone: UTC+7 (ICT)
- Postal code: 60000
- Geocode: 6001

Mueang Nakhon Sawan (Thai: เมืองนครสวรรค์, pronounced [mɯ̄a̯ŋ ná(ʔ).kʰɔ̄ːn sā.wǎn]) is the capital district (amphoe mueang) of Nakhon Sawan province, in central Thailand.

== Geography ==
Neighboring districts are (from the north clockwise) Banphot Phisai, Kao Liao, Chum Saeng, Tha Tako, Phayuha Khiri, Krok Phra and Lat Yao.

The main rivers of the district are the Nan and Ping, which meet in the town of Nakhon Sawan to form the Chao Phraya. In the eastern part of the district lies the Bueng Boraphet swamp, the most important wetland of the province.

== Administration ==
=== Central administration ===
Mueang Nakhon Sawan is divided into 17 subdistricts (tambons), which are further subdivided into 172 administrative villages (mubans).

No.	Name	Thai	Villages	Pop.
1.	Pak Nam Pho	ปากน้ำโพ	-	36,108
2.	Klang Daet	กลางแดด	7	3,857
3.	Kriangkrai	เกรียงไกร	12	5,818
4.	Khwae Yai	แควใหญ่	5	2,445
5.	Takhian Luean	ตะเคียนเลื่อน	12	6,155
6.	Nakhon Sawan Tok	นครสวรรค์ตก	10	48,792
7.	Nakhon Sawan Ok	นครสวรรค์ออก	7	17,742
8.	Bang Phra Luang	บางพระหลวง	6	2,315
9.	Bang Muang	บางม่วง	12	7,746
10.	Ban Makluea	บ้านมะเกลือ	12	9,762
11.	Ban Kaeng	บ้านแก่ง	12	7,854
12.	Phra Non	พระนอน	15	8,739
13.	Wat Sai	วัดไทรย์	15	29,675
14.	Nong Krot	หนองกรด	17	19,231
15.	Nong Kradon	หนองกระโดน	16	14,953
16.	Nong Pling	หนองปลิง	8	17,532
17.	Bueng Senat	บึงเสนาท	6	5,118

=== Local administration ===
There is one city (Thesaban Nakhon) in the district:

- Nakhon Sawan (Thai: เทศบาลนครนครสวรรค์) consisting of subdistrict Pak Nam Pho and parts of subdistricts Khwae Yai, Nakhon Sawan Tok, Nakhon Sawan Ok, and Wat Sai.

There is one subdistrict municipality (thesaban tambon) in the district:

- Nong Ben (Thai: เทศบาลตำบลหนองเบน) consisting of parts of subdistricts Nong Krot and Nong Kradon.

There are 16 subdistrict administrative organizations (SAO) in the district:

- Klang Daet (Thai: องค์การบริหารส่วนตำบลกลางแดด) consisting of subdistrict Klang Daet.
- Kriangkrai (Thai: องค์การบริหารส่วนตำบลเกรียงไกร) consisting of subdistrict Kriangkrai.
- Khwae Yai (Thai: องค์การบริหารส่วนตำบลแควใหญ่) consisting of parts of subdistrict Khwae Yai.
- Takhian Luean (Thai: องค์การบริหารส่วนตำบลตะเคียนเลื่อน) consisting of subdistrict Takhian Luean.
- Nakhon Sawan Tok (Thai: องค์การบริหารส่วนตำบลนครสวรรค์ตก) consisting of parts of subdistrict Nakhon Sawan Tok.
- Nakhon Sawan Ok (Thai: องค์การบริหารส่วนตำบลนครสวรรค์ออก) consisting of parts of subdistrict Nakhon Sawan Ok.
- Bang Phra Luang (Thai: องค์การบริหารส่วนตำบลบางพระหลวง) consisting of subdistrict Bang Phra Luang.
- Bang Muang (Thai: องค์การบริหารส่วนตำบลบางม่วง) consisting of subdistrict Bang Muang.
- Ban Makluea (Thai: องค์การบริหารส่วนตำบลบ้านมะเกลือ) consisting of subdistrict Ban Makluea.
- Ban Kaeng (Thai: องค์การบริหารส่วนตำบลบ้านแก่ง) consisting of subdistrict Ban Kaeng.
- Phra Non (Thai: องค์การบริหารส่วนตำบลพระนอน) consisting of subdistrict Phra Non.
- Wat Sai (Thai: องค์การบริหารส่วนตำบลวัดไทรย์) consisting of parts of subdistrict Wat Sai.
- Nong Krot (Thai: องค์การบริหารส่วนตำบลหนองกรด) consisting of parts of subdistrict Nong Krot.
- Nong Kradon (Thai: องค์การบริหารส่วนตำบลหนองกระโดน) consisting of parts of subdistrict Nong Kradon.
- Nong Pling (Thai: องค์การบริหารส่วนตำบลหนองปลิง) consisting of subdistrict Nong Pling.
- Bueng Senat (Thai: องค์การบริหารส่วนตำบลบึงเสนาท) consisting of subdistrict Bueng Senat.
