= Nakhon Sawan =

Nakhon Sawan นครสวรรค์
- City Municipality
- City of Nakhon Sawan เทศบาลนครนครสวรรค์
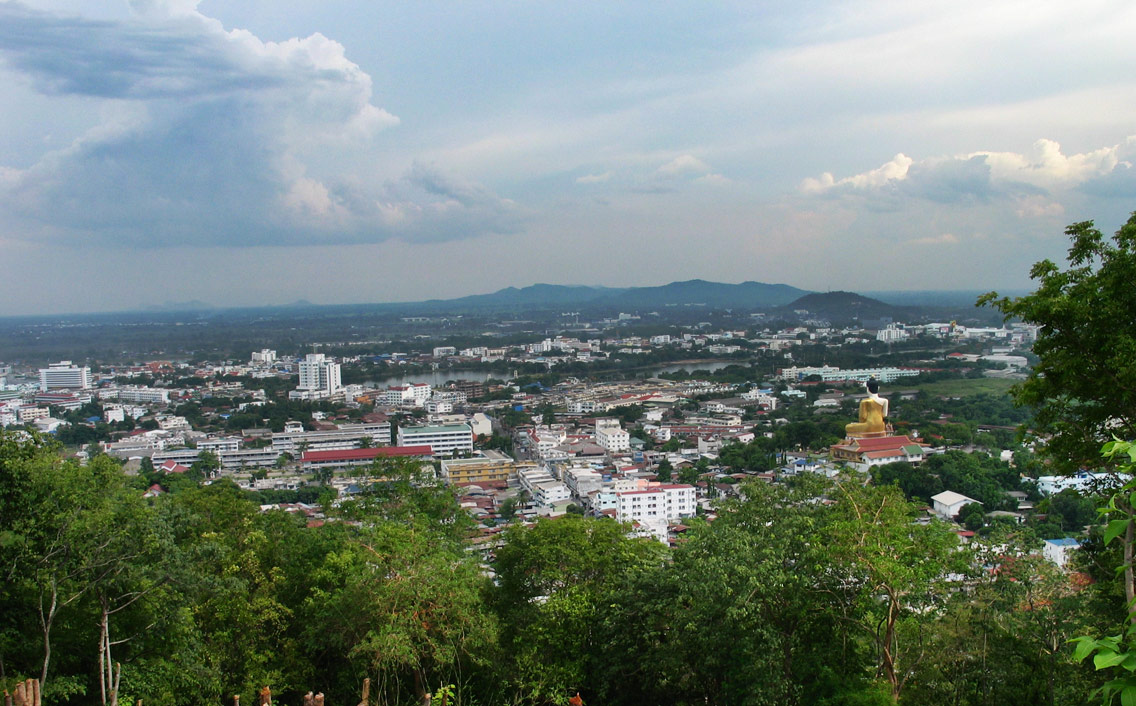
- Nakhon Sawan

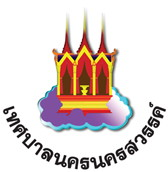
- Seal

- Location in Thailand
- Coordinates: 15°42′48″N 100°08′07″E
- Country: Thailand
- Province: Nakhon Sawan
- District: Mueang Nakhon Sawan

Government
  - Type: City Municipality
  - Mayor: Jittahkasem Nirojthanarat

Area
  - Total: 27.87 km^{2} (10.76 sq mi)
- Elevation: 33 m (108 ft)

Population (2020)
  - Total: 82,305
  - Density: 2,953/km^{2} (7,649/sq mi)
- Registered residents only
- Time zone: UTC+7 (ICT)
- Area code: (+66) 56
- Website: http://www.nakhonsawan.go.th/joomla/

Nakhon Sawan (Thai: นครสวรรค์, pronounced [ná(ʔ).kʰɔ̄ːn sā.wǎn]) is a city (thesaban nakhon) in Thailand. The name literally means "Heavenly City". The city is the capital of Nakhon Sawan province, and covers the complete subdistrict (tambon) of Pak Nam Pho and parts of Khwae Yai, Nakhon Sawan Tok, Nakhon Sawan Ok and Wat Sai, as well as all of Mueang Nakhon Sawan district. As of 31 December 2020, it has a population of 82,305. Nakhon Sawan is 238 km north of Bangkok.

== Geography ==
Nakhon Sawan is about 250 kilometres (160 mi) north of Bangkok, and marks the point of confluence of two of Thailand's major rivers, the Ping and the Nan. These converge in Nakhon Sawan to form the Chao Phraya which flows south to Bangkok and out into the Gulf of Thailand. The city's surroundings are mostly flat, but in the city itself a hill rises about 110 metres (360 ft) above the plain.

Bueng Boraphet, east of Nakhon Sawan, is Thailand's biggest freshwater swamp.

== Population ==
Since 2005, the population of Nakhon Sawan has been declining.

Estimation date	31 Dec 2005	31 Dec 2010	31 Dec 2015	31 Dec 2019
Population	93,568	89,682	85,931	82,305

== Climate ==
Nakhon Sawan has a tropical savanna climate (Köppen climate classification Aw). It is located in a valley, thus resulting in some of the highest overnight lows in the country, often reaching 33 °C (91 °F) in the summer, and up to 43 °C (109 °F) in the day. Winters are dry and warm. Temperatures rise until April, which is very hot with the average daily maximum at 38.1 °C (100.6 °F).The monsoon season runs from May through October, with heavy rain and somewhat cooler temperatures during the day, although nights remain warm.

Climate data for Nakhon Sawan (1991–2020, extremes 1951-present)
Month	Jan	Feb	Mar	Apr	May	Jun	Jul	Aug	Sep	Oct	Nov	Dec	Year
Record high °C (°F)	37.8 (100.0)	39.7 (103.5)	41.4 (106.5)	43.3 (109.9)	42.7 (108.9)	40.0 (104.0)	39.5 (103.1)	38.6 (101.5)	36.6 (97.9)	36.1 (97.0)	37.5 (99.5)	36.3 (97.3)	43.3 (109.9)
Mean daily maximum °C (°F)	32.9 (91.2)	35.1 (95.2)	37.0 (98.6)	38.1 (100.6)	36.4 (97.5)	34.9 (94.8)	34.2 (93.6)	33.7 (92.7)	33.3 (91.9)	32.9 (91.2)	32.7 (90.9)	31.9 (89.4)	34.4 (94.0)
Daily mean °C (°F)	25.7 (78.3)	28.0 (82.4)	30.3 (86.5)	31.5 (88.7)	30.3 (86.5)	29.5 (85.1)	29.0 (84.2)	28.6 (83.5)	28.2 (82.8)	27.9 (82.2)	27.0 (80.6)	25.2 (77.4)	28.4 (83.2)
Mean daily minimum °C (°F)	19.7 (67.5)	22.1 (71.8)	24.9 (76.8)	26.3 (79.3)	26.1 (79.0)	25.7 (78.3)	25.3 (77.5)	25.1 (77.2)	24.8 (76.6)	24.2 (75.6)	22.3 (72.1)	19.7 (67.5)	23.8 (74.9)
Record low °C (°F)	6.1 (43.0)	10.4 (50.7)	14.1 (57.4)	19.7 (67.5)	21.2 (70.2)	22.0 (71.6)	21.5 (70.7)	21.5 (70.7)	21.0 (69.8)	16.2 (61.2)	11.9 (53.4)	7.7 (45.9)	6.1 (43.0)
Average precipitation mm (inches)	5.6 (0.22)	12.5 (0.49)	36.2 (1.43)	62.7 (2.47)	161.1 (6.34)	140.6 (5.54)	145.6 (5.73)	178.2 (7.02)	235.7 (9.28)	153.6 (6.05)	22.0 (0.87)	6.5 (0.26)	1,160.3 (45.68)
Average precipitation days (≥ 1.0 mm)	0.8	0.9	2.4	4.0	10.0	10.5	12.2	12.7	14.7	9.9	2.1	0.7	80.9
Average relative humidity (%)	67.6	63.9	63.4	64.6	72.9	75.7	77.4	79.3	83.2	81.8	75.3	70.1	72.9
Mean monthly sunshine hours	247.0	240.1	255.9	258.0	227.3	178.3	155.5	146.1	158.9	207.3	234.2	242.4	2,551
Mean daily sunshine hours	9.0	8.7	8.9	8.0	5.1	3.9	3.9	3.8	3.6	5.8	7.3	8.4	6.4
Source 1: World Meteorological Organization
Source 2: Office of Water Management and Hydrology, Royal Irrigation Department (daily sun 1981–2010)(extremes)

== Transport ==
Nakhon Sawan lies on Route 1 (Phahonyothin Road), which runs from Bangkok through Ayutthaya and Saraburi before passing through Nakhon Sawan, then continues through Kamphaeng Phet, Lampang, and Chiang Rai until it reaches the border with Myanmar at Mae Sai. Route 117 leads north to Phitsanulok, and Route 225 leads east to Chaiyaphum.

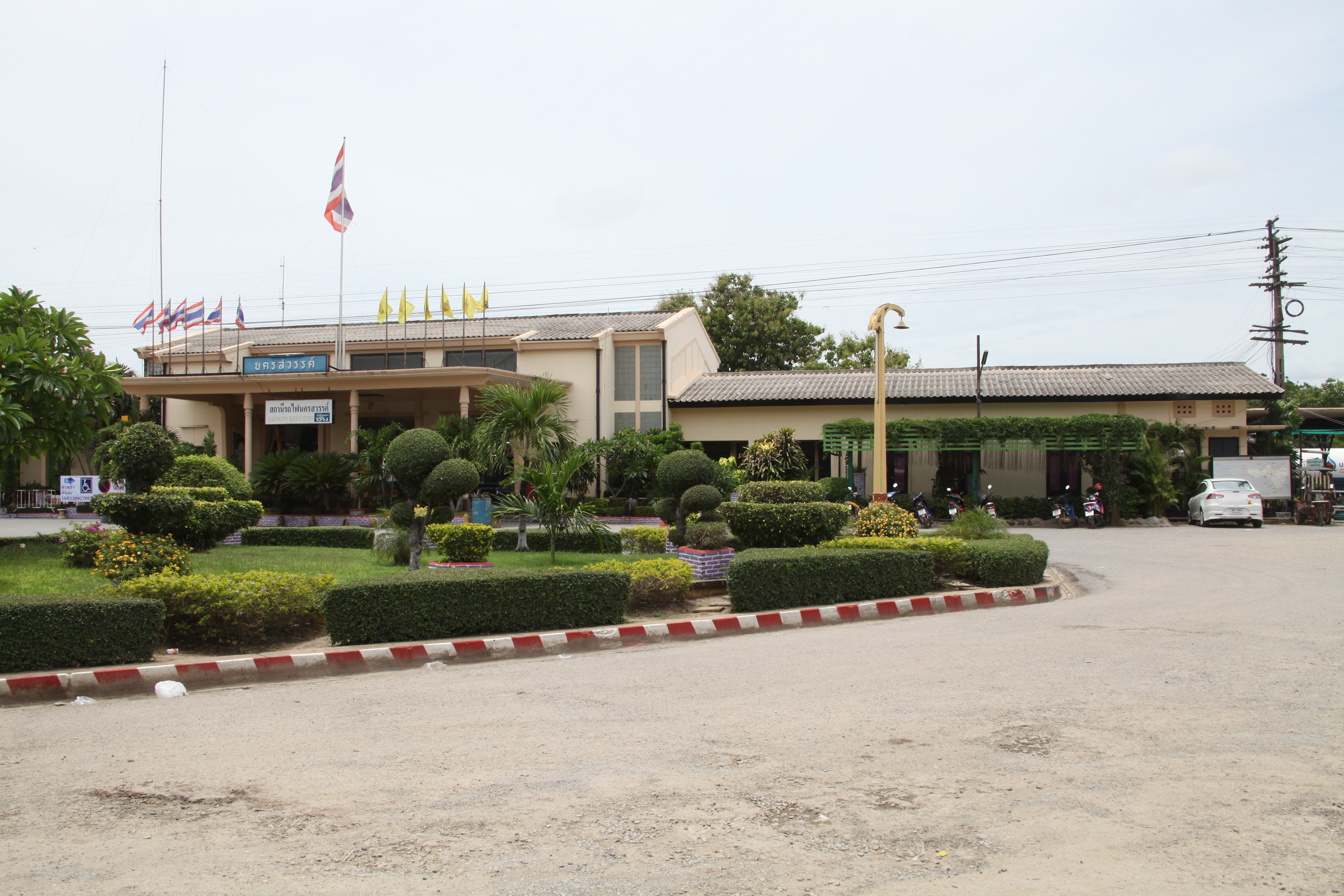
Nakhon Sawan Railway Station

Nakhon Sawan has a station on the Northern Line of the State Railway of Thailand. The station is on the east side of the river, opposite the main city, which is on the west side.

The city is served by Nakhon Sawan Airport.

== Gallery ==
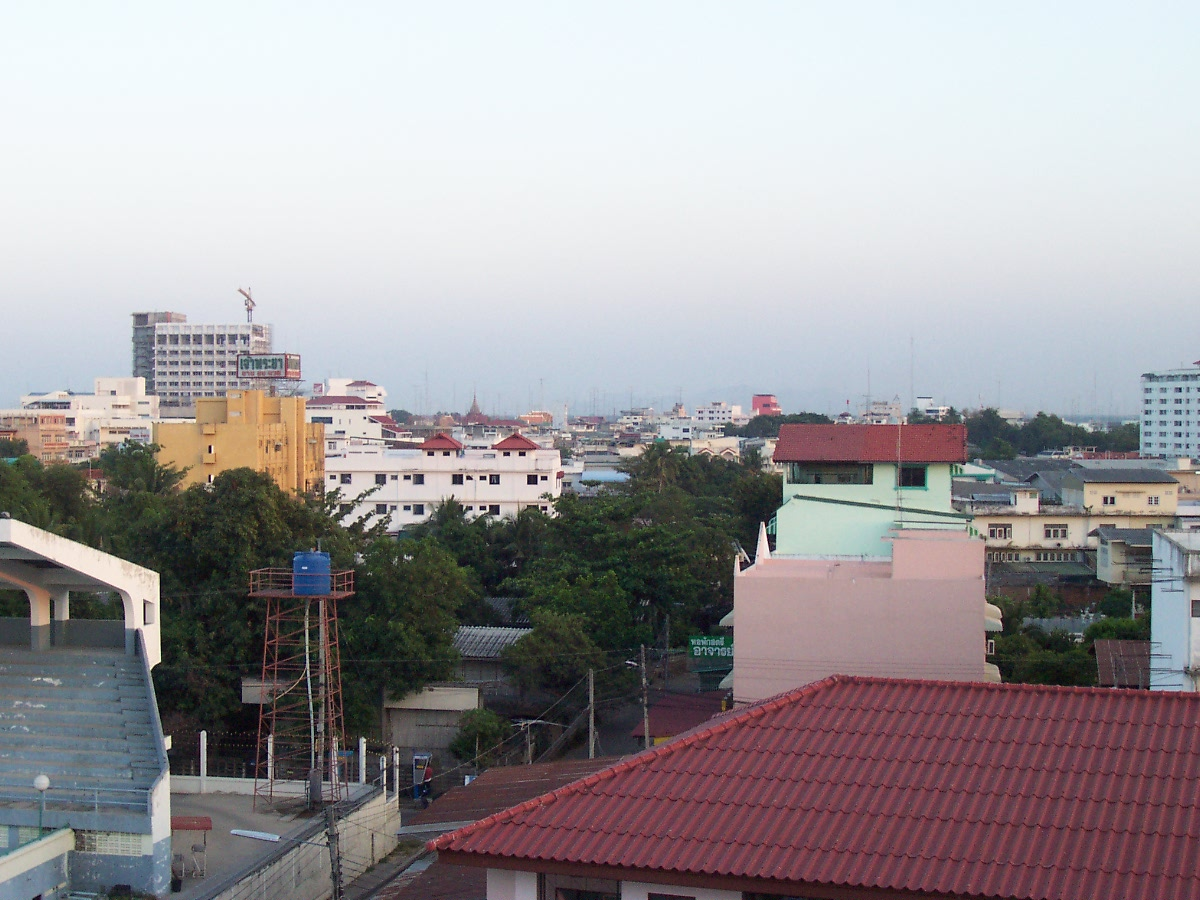

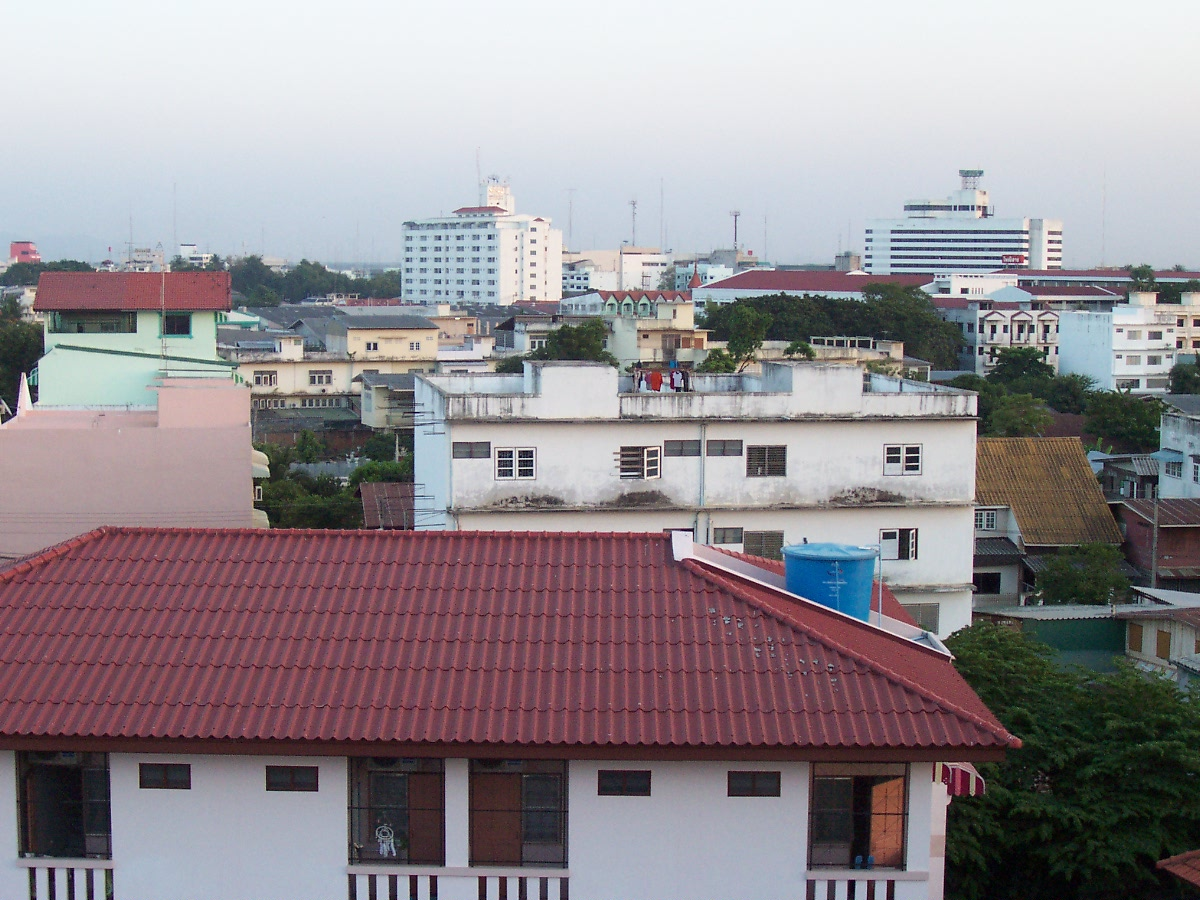

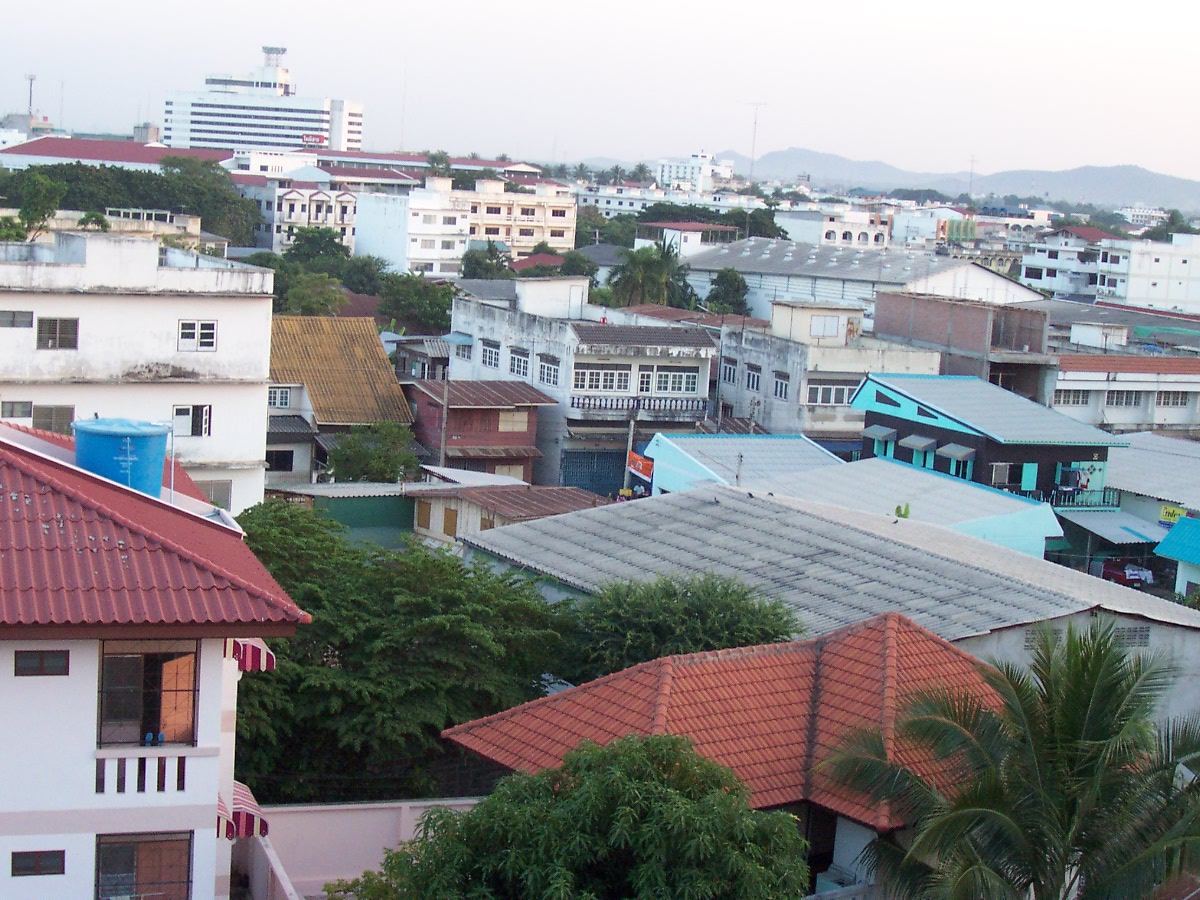

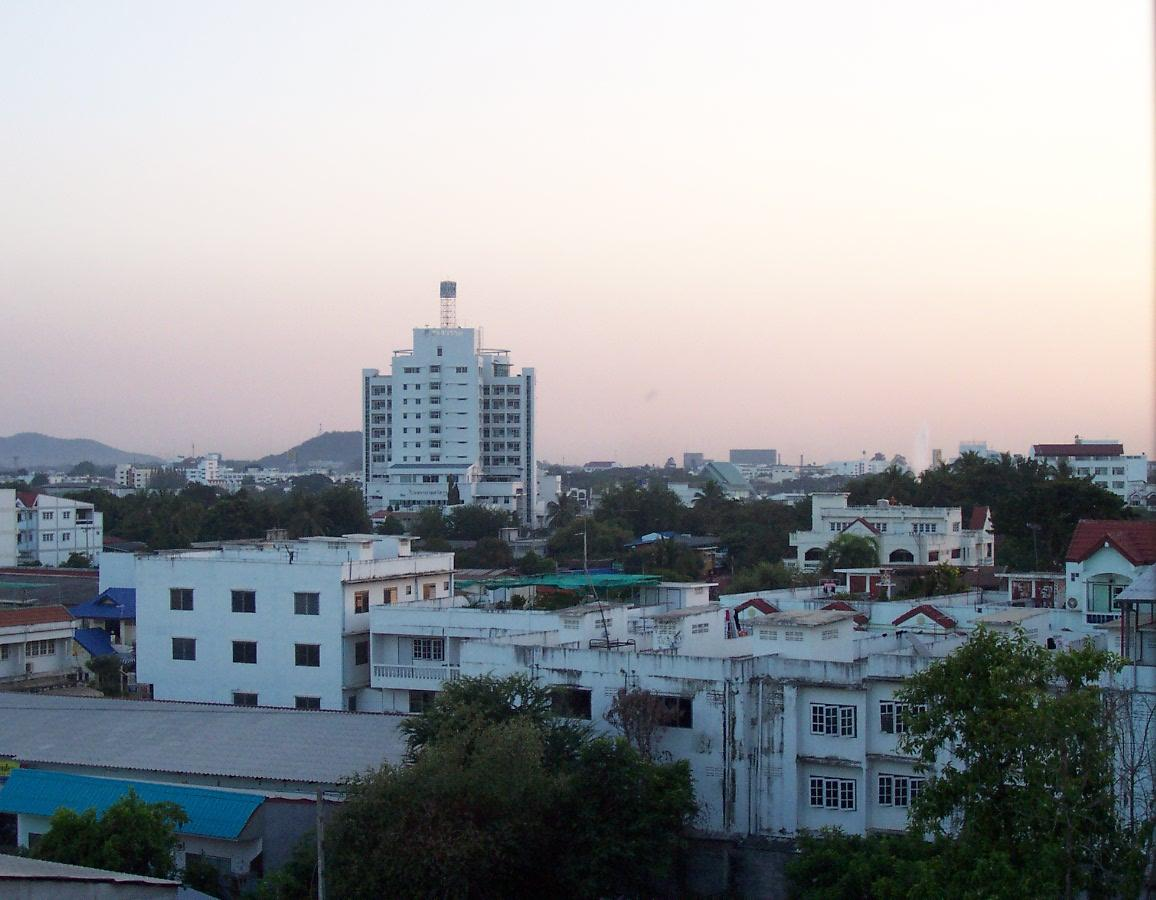

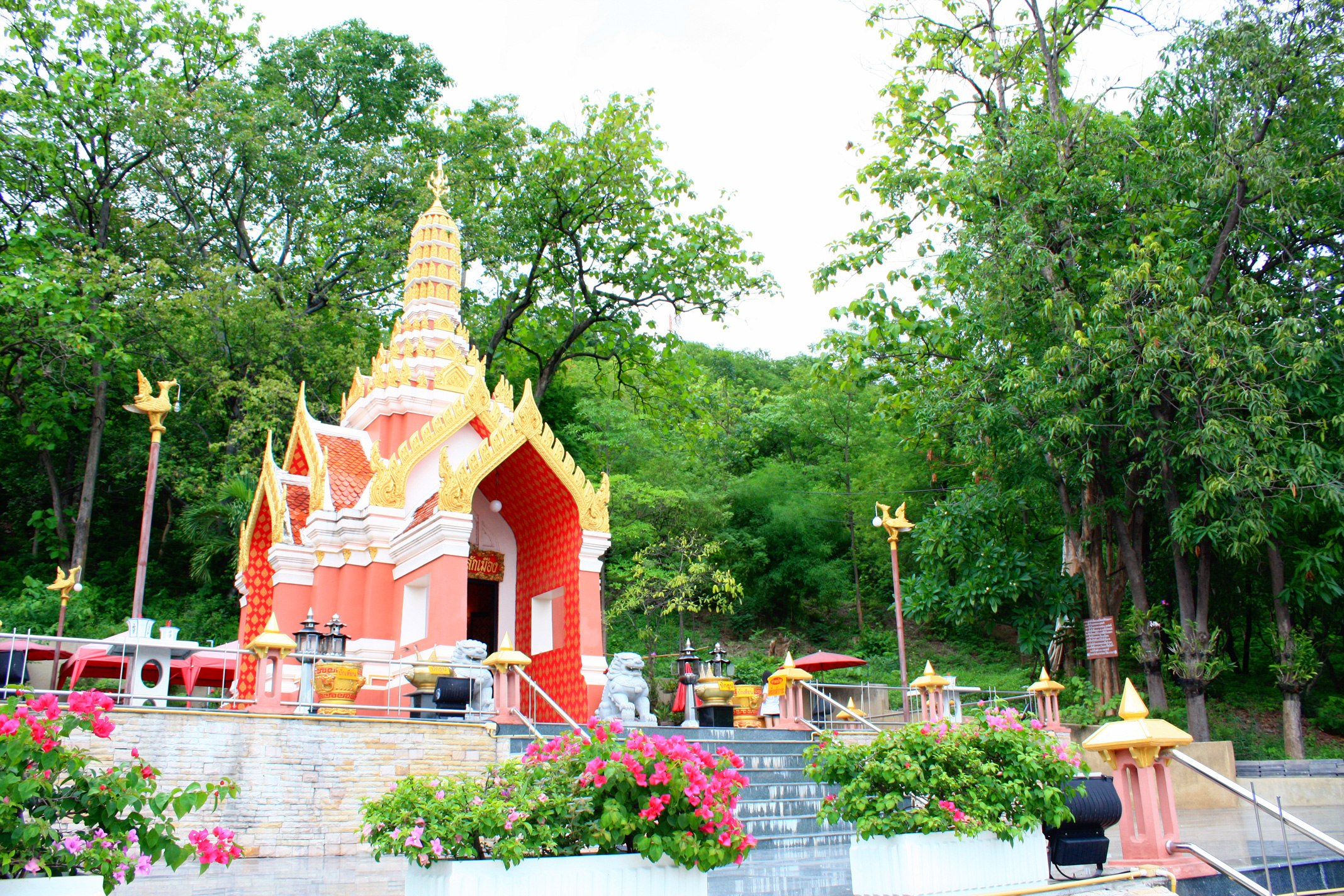

== Notable people ==
- Benchawan Jabthong Painter, Chef
- Janus Putkonen, Director
- Prapawadee Jaorenrattanatarakoon, Weightlifter
