= Bueng Kan (disambiguation) =

Bueng Kan may refer to these places in Thailand:

- Bueng Kan, a town
- Bueng Kan province
- Mueang Bueng Kan district
- Bueng Kan subdistrict
