= Ho Kham, Bueng Kan =

Ho Kham หอคำ
- Subdistrict
- Location within Thailand
- Coordinates: 18.4341°N 103.4349°E
- Country: Thailand
- Province: Bueng Kan
- District: Mueang Bueng Kan

Government
  - Type: Subdistrict municipality

Area
  - Total: 40.05 km^{2} (15.46 sq mi)

Population (2022)
  - Total: 7,265
  - Density: 181/km^{2} (470/sq mi)
- Time zone: UTC+7 (ICT)
- Postal code: 38000
- Calling code: 042
- Geocode: 38010400
- Website: www.hokhum.go.th

Ho Kham (Thai: หอคำ) is a subdistrict (tambon) in Mueang Bueng Kan district, in Bueng Kan province, Isan (northeastern Thailand). As of 2022, it had a population of 7,265 people and has jurisdiction over 14 villages. It lies on Highway 212 and the Mekong River and border with Laos, west of Khai Si and Bueng Kan subdistricts.

== History ==
The subdistrict was created in 1975, when eight administrative villages were split from Non Sawang subdistrict (then still named Nong Kheng) to form the new subdistrict.

== Geography ==
The topography of Ho Kham subdistrict is a lowland area with important natural wetlands, suitable for agriculture.

== Administration ==
=== Central government ===
The administration of Ho Kham subdistrict (tambon) is responsible for an area that covers 25,033 rai ~ 40.05 square kilometres (15.46 sq mi) and consists of fourteen administrative villages (muban).
As of 2022: 7,265 people.

Village	English	Thai	People
Moo1	Ban Ho Kham	บ้านหอคำ	883
Moo2	Ban Sa-ngo	บ้านสะง้อ	634
Moo3	Ban Nong Kheng	บ้านหนองเข็ง	446
Moo4	Ban Khok Sa-ngod	บ้านโคกสะองด	895
Moo5	Ban Non Yang	บ้านโนนยาง	653
Moo6	Ban Muang Mee Chai	บ้านม่วงมีชัย	635
Moo7	Ban Nong Bua Thong	บ้านหนองบัวทอง	489
Moo8	Ban Nong Saeng	บ้านหนองแสง	103
Moo9	Ban Na So	บ้านนาโซ่	391
Moo10	Ban Wang Dan	บ้านวังด่าน	283
Moo11	Ban Thai Charoen	บ้านไทยเจริญ	522
Moo12	Ban Somprasong	บ้านสมประสงค์	239
Moo13	Ban Ho Kham Nuea	บ้านหอคำเหนือ	359
Moo14	Ban Charoenrat	บ้านเจริญรัตน์	733

=== Local government ===
Ho Kham subdistrict municipality (Thai: เทศบาลตำบลหอคำ, romanized: thetsaban tambon Ho Kham) covers the whole Ho Kham subdistrict.

== Temple ==
Ho Kham subdistrict is home to the following active temples, where Theravada Buddhism is practised by local residents:

Temple name	Thai	Location
Wat Suwan Ratchadaram	วัดสุวรรณราชดาราม	Moo1
Wat Pho Chai Nimit	วัดโพธิ์ชัยนิมิต	Moo2
Wat Chom Thong Thammakhun	วัดจอมทองธรรมคุณ	Moo3
Wat Sawang Arom	วัดสว่งอารมณ์	Moo4
Wat Sawang Kongkaram	วัดสว่งคงคาราม	Moo5
Wat Sawang Amphawan	วัดส่วงอัมพวัน	Moo6
Wat Na So Suwanthamkhun	วัดนาโซ่สุวรรณธรรมคุณ	Moo9
Wat Somprasong	วัดสมประสงค์	Moo12
