= Non Sombun, Bueng Kan =

Non Sombun โนนสมบูรณ์
- Subdistrict
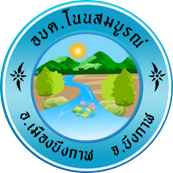
- Seal

- Location within Thailand
- Coordinates: 18°17′54″N 103°39′10″E
- Country: Thailand
- Province: Bueng Kan
- District: Mueang Bueng Kan

Government
  - Type: Subdistrict Administrative Organization (SAO)

Area
  - Total: 63.0 km^{2} (24.3 sq mi)

Population (2022)
  - Total: 10,376
  - Density: 165/km^{2} (430/sq mi)
- Time zone: UTC+7 (ICT)
- Postal code: 38000
- Calling code: 042
- Geocode: 38010200
- Website: bknonsomboon.go.th/index.php

Non Sombun (Thai: โนนสมบูรณ์) is a sub-district (tambon) in Mueang Bueng Kan District, Bueng Kan Province, far northeastern Thailand. As of 2012, it has a population of 10,376 people. It lies on Thailand Route 222, south of Bueng Kan.

== History ==
The sub-district was created in 1968, when 12 administrative villages were split from Bueng Kan subdistrict to form the new sub-district. In 1978 the sub-district Na Sawan was split off from Non Sombun.

== Geography ==
The topography of Non Sombun subdistrict is a high hill on the west side slopes down to the east side. The deep undulation on the east side has a marshy area in the middle.

== Administration ==
=== Central government ===
The administration of ฺNon Sombun subdistrict (tambon) is responsible for an area that covers 63.0 square kilometres (24.3 sq mi) and consists of thirteen administrative villages (muban). As of 2022: 10,376 people.

Village	English	Thai	People
Moo1	Ban Non Sombun	บ้านโนนสมบูรณ์	868
Moo2	Ban Don Udom	บ้านดอนอุดม	1,010
Moo3	Ban Dok Ngam	บ้านโดกงาม	558
Moo4	Ban Thong Sai	บ้านทองสาย	1,051
Moo5	Ban Kamphaeng Phet	บ้านกำแพงเพชร	1,124
Moo6	Ban Non Champa	บ้านโนนจำปา	735
Moo7	Ban Dong Tong	บ้านดงต้อง	805
Moo8	Ban Non Kham Phu	บ้านโนนคำภู	718
Moo9	Ban Pho Thong	บ้านโพธิ์ทอง	949
Moo10	Ban Nong Khong Dam	บ้านหนองฆ้องดำ	593
Moo11	Ban Khok Sa-ad	บ้านโคกสะอาด	444
Moo12	Ban Don Kaew	บ้านดอนแก้ว	588
Moo13	Ban Sai Thong	บ้านทรายทอง	933

=== Local government ===
Non Sombun Subdistrict Administrative Organization - Non Sombun SAO (Thai: องค์การบริหารตำบลโนนสมบูรณ์, romanized: ongkan borihan suan tambon Non Sombun) covers the whole Non Sombun subdistrict.

== Temples ==
Non Sombun subdistrict is home to the following active temples, where Theravada Buddhism is practised by local residents:

Temple name	Thai	Location
Wat Si Muang Thammakhun	วัดศรีเมืองธรรมคุณ	Moo1
Wat Sawang Aranya Waree	วัดสว่างอรัญวารี	Moo4
Wat Pho Ngam	วัดโพธิ์งาม	Moo9
