= Phon Charoen =

Phon Charoen พรเจริญ
- Subdistrict
- Location within Thailand
- Coordinates: 18°1′33″N 103°42′34″E
- Country: Thailand
- Province: Bueng Kan
- District: Phon Charoen

Population (2010)
  - Total: 10,254
- Time zone: UTC+7 (ICT)
- Postal code: 38180
- TIS 1099: 380203

Phon Charoen (Thai: พรเจริญ is a sub-district (tambon) in Phon Charoen District, in Bueng Kan Province, northeastern Thailand. It lies in the southern part of the province. As of 2010, it had a population of 10,254 people and has jurisdiction over 11 villages. It lies along Thailand Route 222, south of Chumphu Phon and Si Wilai and north of Tha Kok Daeng.
