= Ban Ahong =

Ban Ahong บ้านอาฮง
- Location within Thailand
- Coordinates: 18°25′15″N 103°28′00″E
- Country: Thailand
- Province: Bueng Kan
- Amphoe: Mueang Bueng Kan

Population (2022)
  - Total: 583
- Time zone: UTC+7 (ICT)
- TIS 1099: 38010803

Ban Ahong (Thai: บ้านอาฮง), is a riverside village in northeastern Thailand on the banks of the Mekong. It is in tambon Khai Si in Bueng Kan Province. The village is close to Isan's northernmost point and is just over 100 km (60 mi) east of Nong Khai and 20 km (12 mi) from the provincial capital of Bueng Kan. This stretch of the Mekong is narrow and deep and naga fireballs were first reported here.

== Sights and attractions ==
Wat Ahong Silawat Buddhist temple sits on the riverside near a large whirlpool ("navel of the Mekong"). The temple features a 7 m (23 ft) tall Buddha statue facing across the river. The whirlpool is active during the rainy season from about June to September.

== Transport ==
Ban Ahong is connected by Highway 212 to both Nong Khai and Bueng Kan. Bus services to both towns use this road.
