= Chumphu Phon =

Chumphu Phon ชุมภูพร
- Subdistrict
- Location within Thailand
- Coordinates: 18°8′44″N 103°44′32″E
- Country: Thailand
- Province: Bueng Kan
- District: Si Wilai

Population (2010)
  - Total: 7,475
- Time zone: UTC+7 (ICT)
- Postal code: 38210
- TIS 1099: 380702

Chumphu Phon (Thai: ชุมภูพร) is a sub-district (tambon) in Si Wilai District, in Bueng Kan Province, northeastern Thailand. As of 2010, it had a population of 7,475 people and jurisdiction over 12 villages. It lies along Thailand Route 222, south of Si Wilai and north of Phon Charoen.
