= Wisit =

Wisit วิศิษฐ์
- Subdistrict
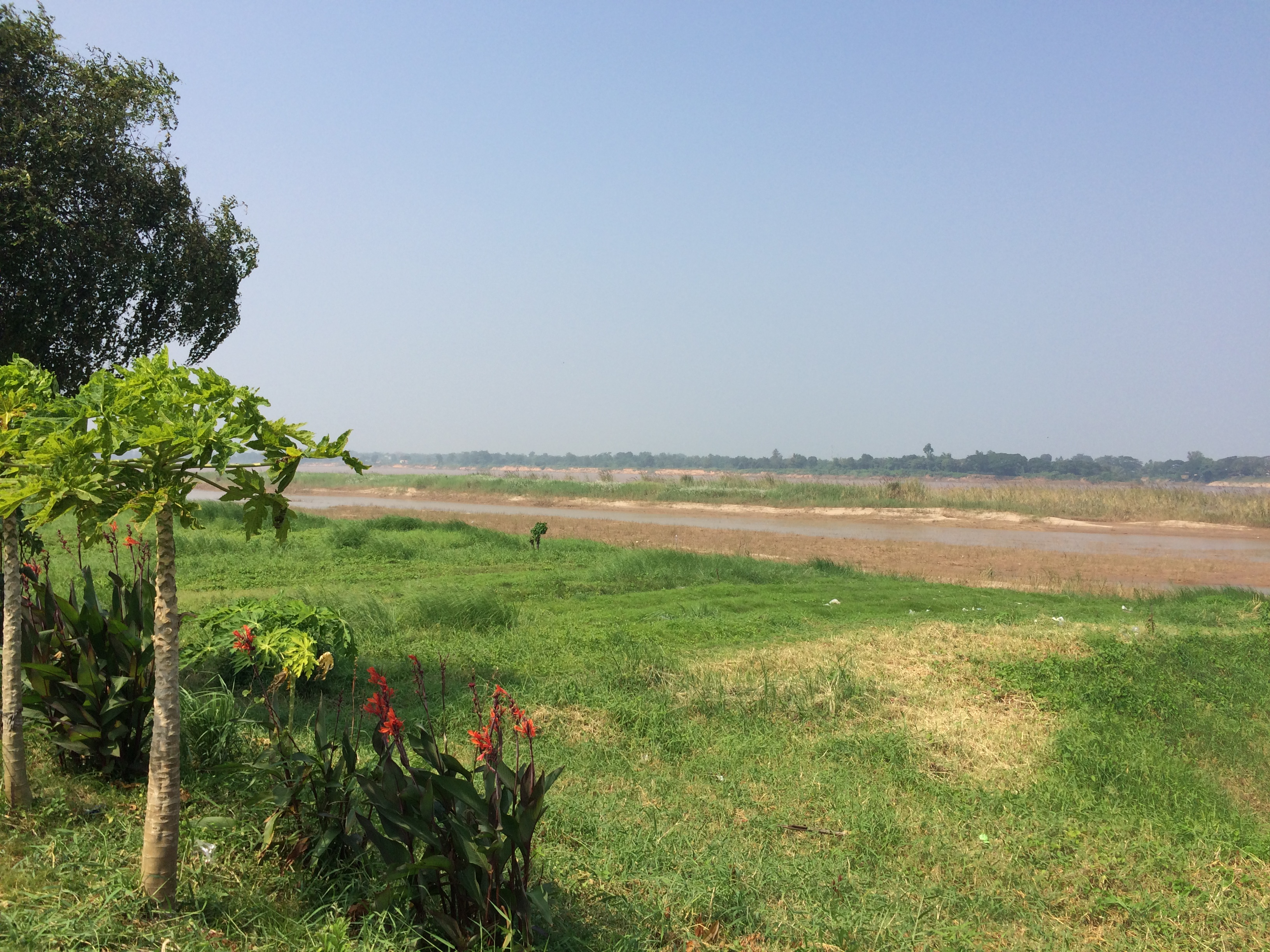
- Wisit, Mueang Bueng Kan district, Bueng Kan 38000, Thailand

- Location within Thailand
- Coordinates: 18.348°N 103.6308°E
- Country: Thailand
- Province: Bueng Kan
- District: Mueang Bueng Kan

Government
  - Type: Bueng Kan town municipality covers the subdistrict

Area
  - Total: 68.33 km^{2} (26.38 sq mi)

Population (2022)
  - Total: 10,278
  - Density: 150/km^{2} (390/sq mi)
- Time zone: UTC+7 (ICT)
- Postal code: 38000
- Calling code: 042
- Geocode: 38011000
- Website: www.buengkhanml.go.th

Wisit (Thai: วิศิษฐ์) is a subdistrict (tambon) in Mueang Bueng Kan district, in Bueng Kan province, Isan (northeastern Thailand). As of 2022, it had a population of 10,278 people and has jurisdiction over thirteen villages. It lies on Highway 212 and the Mekong River and borders with Laos, west of Bueng Kan subdistrict and east of Khai Si subdistrict.

== History ==
On 25 March 2020, the Ministry of Interior announce to dissolve Wisit subdistrict municipality and Bueng Kan subdistrict administrative organization (SAO) and combine the two with Bueng Kan subdistrict municipality. Also upgrade the status of the latter to Bueng Kan town municipality. Published in Royal Gazette, volume 137, special section 179 Ngor, dated 5 August 2020 and effective on the same date.

== Geography ==
Generally, plains interspersed with undulating, uneven slopes.

== Administration ==
=== Central government ===
The administration of Wisit subdistrict (tambon) is responsible for an area that covers 42,708 rai ~ 68.33 square kilometres (26.38 sq mi) and consists of thirteen administrative villages (muban).
As of 2022: 10,278 people.

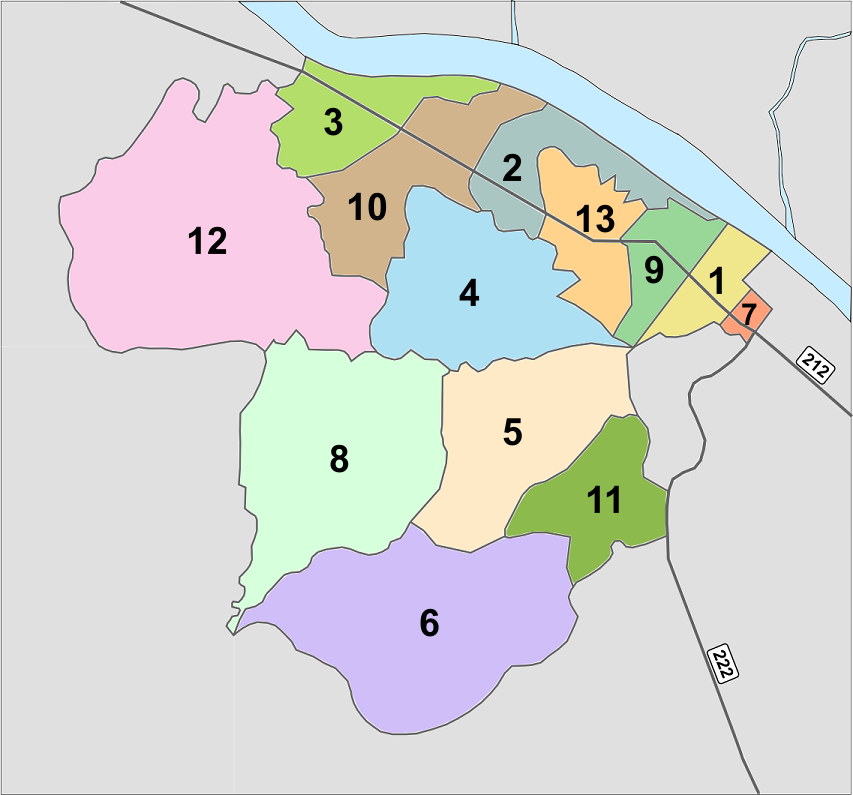
Wisit subdistrict with villages

Village	English	Thai	People
Moo1	Ban Bueng Kan Nuea	บ้านบึงกาฬเหนือ	1,070
Moo2	Ban Phan Lam	บ้านพันลำ	460
Moo3	Ban Nong Waeng	บ้านหนองแวง	753
Moo4	Ban Na Pan	บ้านนาป่าน	968
Moo5	Ban Nong Na Saeng	บ้านหนองนาแชง	546
Moo6	Ban Lao Thawon	บ้านเหล่าถาวร	1,331
Moo7	Ban Wisit	บ้านวิศิษฐ์	1,972
Moo8	Ban Huai Dok Mai	บ้านห้วยดอกไม้	507
Moo9	Ban Na Nuea	บ้านนาหนือ	811
Moo10	Ban Saen Charoen	บ้านแสนเจริญ	397
Moo11	Ban Don Charoen	บ้านดอนเจริญ	941
Moo12	Ban Na Suksan	บ้านนาสุขสันต์	179
Moo13	Ban Chak Thip Samakkhee	บ้านจักรทิพย้สามัคคี	343

== Temples ==
Wisit subdistrict is home to the following active temples, where Theravada Buddhism is practised by local residents:

Temple name	Thai	Location
Wat Buppharat Samoson	วัดบุพพราชสโมสร	Moo1
Wat Charoen Tham	วัดเจริญธรรม	Moo2
Wat Si Boon Rueang	วัดสรีบุญเรือง	Moo3
Wat Chom Chaeng	วัดจอมแจ้ง	Moo4
Wat Si Woramongkon	วัดสรีวรมงคล	Moo5
Wat Tham Phra	วัดถ้ำพระ	Moo5
Wat Si Boon Rueang Khanaram	วัดสรีบุญเรืองคณาราม	Moo6
Wat Don Charoen	วัดดอนเจิญ	Moo11
Wat Na Suksam	วัดนาสุขสันต์	Moo12
