= Khai Si =

Khai Si ไคสี
- Subdistrict
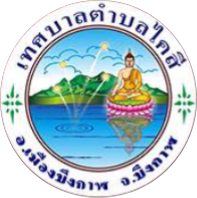
- Seal

- Location within Thailand
- Coordinates: 18.4115°N 103.5187°E
- Country: Thailand
- Province: Bueng Kan
- District: Mueang Bueng Kan

Government
  - Type: Subdistrict municipality

Area
  - Total: 59.04 km^{2} (22.80 sq mi)

Population (2022)
  - Total: 5,466
  - Density: 93/km^{2} (240/sq mi)
- Time zone: UTC+7 (ICT)
- Postal code: 38000
- Calling code: 042
- Geocode: 38010800
- Website: khaisi.go.th

Khai Si (Thai: ไคสี) is a subdistrict (tambon) in Mueang Bueng Kan district, in Bueng Kan province, Isan (northeastern Thailand). As of 2022, it had a population of 5,466 people and has jurisdiction over ten villages. It lies on Highway 212 and the Mekong River and border with Laos, west of Bueng Kan and east of Ho Kham.

== History ==
The subdistrict was created in 1979, when nine administrative villages were split from Non Sawang subdistrict (then still named Nong Kheng) to form the new sub-district.

== Administration ==
=== Central government ===
The administration of Khai Si subdistrict (tambon) is responsible for an area that covers 36,905 rai ~ 59.04 square kilometres (22.80 sq mi) and consists of ten administrative villages (muban).
As of 2022: 5,466 people.

Village	English	Thai	People
Moo1	Ban Tha Sa-ad	บ้านท่าสะอาด	615
Moo2	Ban Don Yom	บ้านดอนยม	626
Moo3	Ban A-hong	บ้านอาฮง	583
Moo4	Ban Non Sila	บ้านโนนศิลา	568
Moo5	Ban Khai Si	บ้านไคสี	349
Moo6	Ban Siriphon	บ้านศิริพร	628
Moo7	Ban Kham Muen	บ้านคำหมื่น	616
Moo8	Ban Huai Seum Nuea	บ้านห้วยเซือมเหนือ	472
Moo9	Ban Non Phaeng	บ้านโนนแพง	406
Moo10	Ban Kham Saen	บ้านคำแสน	603

=== Local government ===
Khai Si subdistrict municipality (Thai: เทศบาลตำบลไคสี, romanized: thetsaban tambon Khai Si) covers the whole Khai Si subdistrict.

== Temple ==
Khai Si subdistrict is home to the following active temples, where Theravada Buddhism is practised by local residents:

Temple name	Thai	Location
Wat Yod Kaew Thammakhun	วัดยอดแก้วธรรมคุณ	Moo1
Wat Phonchai Thammakhun	วัดพรชัยธรรมคุณ	Moo2
Wat A-hong Silawat	วัดอาฮงศิลาวาส	Moo3
Wat Sawang Kongkaram	วัดสว่างคงคาราม	Moo4
Wat Sumontharam	วัดสุมณฑาราม	Moo5
Wat Si Somboon	วัดศรีสมบูรณ์	Moo6
Wat Thepmanee Si Amphon	วัดเทพมณีศรีอัมพร	Moo7
Wat Si Chom Chuen	วัดศรีชมชี่น	Moo8
Wat Ban Non Phaeng	วัดบ้านโนนแพง	Moo9
Wat Samakkheetham	วัดสามัคคีธรรม	Moo10
