= Pong Pueai =

Pong Pueai โป่งปือย
- Subdistrict
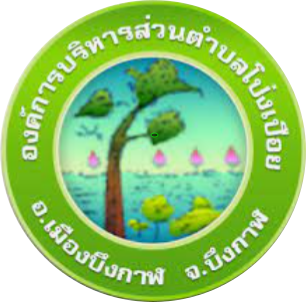
- Seal

- Location within Thailand
- Coordinates: 18.3273°N 103.5295°E
- Country: Thailand
- Province: Bueng Kan
- District: Mueang Bueng Kan

Government
  - Type: Subdistrict Administrative Organization (SAO)

Area
  - Total: 37.33 km^{2} (14.41 sq mi)

Population (2022)
  - Total: 5,307
  - Density: 142/km^{2} (370/sq mi)
- Time zone: UTC+7 (ICT)
- Postal code: 38000
- Calling code: 042
- Geocode: 38011200
- Website: pongpuai.go.th/public/

Pong Pueai is a subdistrict (tambon) in Mueang Bueng Kan District, in Bueng Kan Province, northeastern Thailand. As of 2022, it had a population of 5,307 people, with jurisdiction over seven villages.

== Administration ==
=== Central government ===
The administration of ฺPong Pueai subdistrict (tambon) is responsible for an area that covers 37.33 square kilometres (14.41 sq mi) and consists of seven administrative villages (muban). As of 2022: 5,307 people.

| Village | English | Thai | People |
|---|---|---|---|
| Moo1 | Ban Huai Kok Thong | บ้านกกต้อง | 680 |
| Moo2 | Ban Pong Pueai | บ้านโป่งเปือย | 875 |
| Moo3 | Ban Samai Saran | บ้านสมัยส่าราญ | 800 |
| Moo4 | Ban Non Si Thong | บ้านโนนศรีทอง | 821 |
| Moo5 | Ban Nong Bua Ban | บ้านหนองบัวบาน | 479 |
| Moo6 | Ban Huai Sam Yot Thewakhun | บ้านห้วยสามยอดเทวกุล | 1,173 |
| Moo7 | Ban Nong Ta Kai | บ้านหนองตาไก้ | 479 |

=== Local government ===
Pong Pueai Subdistrict Administrative Organization - Pong Pueai SAO (Thai: องค์การบริหารตำบลโป่งปือย, romanized: ongkan borihan suan tambon Pong Pueai) covers the whole Pong Pueai subdistrict.

== Temples ==
Pong Pueai subdistrict is home to the following active temples, where Theravada Buddhism is practised by local residents:

| Temple name | Thai | Location |
|---|---|---|
| Wat Pong Thong Chai Phattharam | วัดโป่งทองชัยพัฒนาราม | Moo2 |
| Wat Sawang Thewakun | วัดสว่างเทวกุล | Moo6 |
