= Nong Loeng =

Nong Loeng หนองเลิง
- Subdistrict
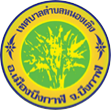
- Seal

- Location within Thailand
- Coordinates: 18.3482°N 103.3982°E
- Country: Thailand
- Province: Bueng Kan
- District: Mueang Bueng Kan

Government
  - Type: Subdistrict municipality

Area
  - Total: 53.7 km^{2} (20.7 sq mi)

Population (2022)
  - Total: 8,737
  - Density: 163/km^{2} (420/sq mi)
- Time zone: UTC+7 (ICT)
- Postal code: 38000
- Calling code: 042
- Geocode: 38010500
- Website: nongleng-bk.go.th

Nong Loeng (Thai: หนองเลิง) is a subdistrict (tambon) in Mueang Bueng Kan district, in Bueng Kan province, Isan (northeastern Thailand). As of 2022, it had a population of 8,737 people and has jurisdiction over thirteen villages.

== History ==
The subdistrict was created effective on June 26, 1975 by splitting off six administrative villages from Nong Kheng.

== Geography ==
The general topography of Nong Loeng subdistrict is plain and hilly.

== Administration ==
=== Central government ===
The administration of Nong Loeng subdistrict (tambon) is responsible for an area that covers 53.7 square kilometres (20.7 sq mi) and consists of thirteen administrative villages (muban).
As of 2022: 8,737 people.

Village	English	Thai	People
Moo1	Ban Na Charoen	บ้านาเจริญ	578
Moo2	Ban Suk Samran	บ้านสุขสำราญ	844
Moo3	Ban Non Manee	บ้านโนนมณี	260
Moo4	Ban Nong Loeng	บ้านหนองเลิง	694
Moo5	Ban Nong Moo	บ้านหนองหมู	1,209
Moo6	Ban Klong Khem	บ้านคลองเค็ม	829
Moo7	Ban Na Lom	บ้านนาล้อม	750
Moo8	Ban Na Charoen Nuea	บ้านนาเจริญเหนือ	570
Moo9	Ban San Sern	บ้านสรรเสริญ	567
Moo10	Ban Charoen Samakkhee	บ้านเจริญสามัคคี	543
Moo11	Ban Kham Charoen	บ้านคำเจริญ	618
Moo12	Ban Non Sa-nga	บ้านโนนสง่า	794
Moo13	Ban Na Charoen Klang	บ้านนาเจริญกลาง	481

=== Local government ===
Nong Loeng subdistrict municipality (Thai: เทศบาลตำบลหนองเลิง, romanized: thetsaban tambon Nong Loeng) covers the whole Nong Loeng subdistrict.

== Temple ==
Nong Loeng subdistrict is home to the following active temples, where Theravada Buddhism is practised by local residents:

Temple name	Thai	Location
Wat Sawang Samran Thammakhun	วัดสว่างสำราญธรรมคุณ	Moo1
Wat Samai Samran	วัดสมัยสำราญ	Moo3
Wat Si Supwanaram	วัดศรีสุพลวนาราม	Moo4
Wat Charoen Sangvara Bumrungrad	วัดเจริญสังวรบำรุงราษฎร์	Moo5
Wat Si Sumangkalaram	วัดศรีสุมังคลาราม	Moo5
Wat Sawang Arom	วัดส่วางอารมณ์	Moo6
Wat Thepnimit Mahawilai	วัดเทพนิมิตมหาวิลัย	Moo6
Wat Koh Kaew Wanaram	วัดเกาะแก้ววนาราม	Moo9
Wat Pracha Samakkheetham	วัดประชาสามัคคีธรรม	Moo10
