= Si Wilai subdistrict =

Si Wilai ศรีวิไล
- Subdistrict
- Location within Thailand
- Coordinates: 18°10′52″N 103°44′37″E
- Country: Thailand
- Province: Bueng Kan
- District: Si Wilai

Population (2010)
  - Total: 10,846
- Time zone: UTC+7 (ICT)
- Postal code: 38210
- TIS 1099: 380701

Si Wilai (Thai: ศรีวิไล) is subdistrict (tambon) in Si Wilai District, in Bueng Kan Province, northeastern Thailand. It is the seat of Si Wilai District. As of 2010, it had a population of 10,846 people and jurisdiction over 12 villages. It lies on Thailand Route 222, south of Non Sombun and Bueng Kan. A bus service connects it to Bueng Kan.
