= Chaiyaphon =

Chaiyaphon ชัยพร
- Subdistrict
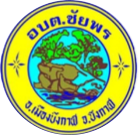
- Seal

- Location within Thailand
- Coordinates: 18.2771°N 103.8779°E
- Country: Thailand
- Province: Bueng Kan
- District: Mueang Bueng Kan

Government
  - Type: Subdistrict Administrative Organization (SAO)

Area
  - Total: 74.12 km^{2} (28.62 sq mi)

Population (2022)
  - Total: 8,339
  - Density: 112/km^{2} (290/sq mi)
- Time zone: UTC+7 (ICT)
- Postal code: 38000
- Calling code: 042
- Geocode: 38010900
- Website: chaiyaporn.go.th/public

Chaiyaphon is a subdistrict (tambon) in Mueang Bueng Kan District, in Bueng Kan Province, northeastern Thailand. As of 2022, it had a population of 8,339 people, with jurisdiction over 13 villages.

== Geography ==
The topography of Chaiyaphon subdistrict is plain and lowland, there are few natural forests and is located in the upper part of Isan. The Mekong river flows north of the subdistrict.

== Administration ==
=== Central government ===
The administration of ฺChaiyaphon subdistrict (tambon) is responsible for an area that covers 74.12 square kilometres (28.62 sq mi) and consists of thirteen administrative villages (muban). As of 2022: 8,339 people.

Village	English	Thai	People
Moo1	Ban Chaiyaphon	บ้านชัยพร	829
Moo2	Ban Huai Seum Tai	บ้านห้วยเซือมใต้	717
Moo3	Ban Non Suphan	บ้านโนนสุพรรณ	369
Moo4	Ban Nong Yao	บ้านหนองยาว	789
Moo5	Ban Kham Phu	บ้านคำภู	1,165
Moo6	Ban Na Thong	บ้านนาต้อง	494
Moo7	Ban Bang Bat	บ้านบังบาตร	351
Moo8	Ban Klang	บ้านกลาง	523
Moo9	Ban Non Hua Aang	บ้านโนนหัวอ่าง	521
Moo10	Ban Pha Sawan	บ้านผาสวรรค์	863
Moo11	Ban Mai Chaiyaphon	บ้านใหม่ชัยพร	833
Moo12	Ban Non Sanga	บ้านโนนสง่า	293
Moo13	Ban Non Uthai Thong	บ้านโนนอุทัยทอง	592

=== Local government ===
Chaiyaphon Subdistrict Administrative Organization - Chaiyaphon SAO (Thai: องค์การบริหารตำบลชัยพร, romanized: ongkan borihan suan tambon Chaiyaphon) covers the whole Chaiyaphon subdistrict.

== Temple ==
Chaiyaphon subdistrict is home to the following active temples, where Theravada Buddhism is practised by local residents:

Temple name	Thai	Location
Wat Uthai Thong	วัดอุทัย	Moo4
Wat Si Boon Rueang	วัดศรีบุญเรือง	Moo7
Wat Udom Si That	วัดอุดมศรีทัศน์	Moo10
Wat Si Sawang Arom	วัดศรีสว่างอารมณ์	Moo11
