= Si Chomphu =

Si Chomphu is the name of several administrative entities in Thailand

- Si Chomphu District, Khon Kaen province
- Si Chomphu subdistrict, Si Chomphu district, Khon Kaen province
- Si Chomphu subdistrict, Phon Charoen district, Bueng Kan province
- Si Chomphu subdistrict, So Phisai district, Bueng Kan province
- Si Chomphu subdistrict, Na Kae district, Nakhon Phanom province
