= Bueng Kan subdistrict =

Bueng Kan subdistrict ตำบลบึงกาฬ
- Subdistrict
- Location within Thailand
- Coordinates: 18.3254°N 103.6704°E
- Country: Thailand
- Province: Bueng Kan
- District: Mueang Bueng Kan

Government
  - Type: Subdistrict is covered by Bueng Kan town municipality

Area
  - Total: 26.86 km^{2} (10.37 sq mi)

Population (2022)
  - Total: 9,825
  - Density: 365/km^{2} (950/sq mi)
- Time zone: UTC+7 (ICT)
- Postal code: 38000
- Calling code: 042
- Geocode: 38010100
- Website: www.buengkhanml.go.th

Bueng Kan (Thai: บึงกาฬ) is a subdistrict (tambon) in Mueang Bueng Kan district, in Bueng Kan province, Isan (northeastern Thailand). As of 2022, it had a population of 9,825 people and has jurisdiction over eleven villages. It lies on Highway 212 and the Mekong River and borders with Laos, west of Khok Kong subdistrict and east of Wisit subdistrict.

== History ==
On 25 March 2020, the Ministry of Interior announce to dissolve Wisit subdistrict municipality and Bueng Kan subdistrict administrative organization (SAO) and combine the two with Bueng Kan subdistrict municipality. Also upgrade the status of the latter to Bueng Kan town municipality. Published in Royal Gazette, volume 137, special section 179 Ngor, date 5 August 2020 and effective on the same date.

== Geography ==
Most of the area is lowland. The Mekong River flows north of the subdistrict with watersources, that are important to agriculture and fisheries, such as Nong Bueng Kan, Nong Fang Daeng and Huai Kan Ya.

== Administration ==
=== Central government ===
The administration of Bueng Kan subdistrict (tambon) is responsible for an area that covers 16,786 rai ~ 26.86 square kilometres (10.37 sq mi) and consists of eleven administrative villages (muban).
As of 2022: 9,825 people.

Village	English	Thai	People
Moo1	Ban Bueng Kan Klang	บ้านบึงกาฬกลาง	1,285
Moo2	Ban Si Sophon	บ้านศรีโสภณ	625
Moo3	Ban Bueng Kan Tai	บ้านบึงกาฬใต้	596
Moo4	Ban Na Non	บ้านนาโนน	981
Moo5	Ban Tha Krai	บ้านท่าไคร้	1,143
Moo6	Ban Tha Pho	บ้านท่าโพธิ์	1,109
Moo7	Ban Dong Mak Yang	บ้านดองมากยาง	449
Moo8	Ban Bueng Sawan	บ้านบึงสวรรค์	815
Moo9	Ban San Prasert	บ้านแสนประเสริฐ	1,199
Moo10	Ban San Samran	บ้านแสนสำราญ	929
Moo11	Ban San Suk	บ้านแสนสุข	692

== Temples ==
Bueng Kan subdistrict is home to the following active temples, where Theravada Buddhism is practised by local residents:

Temple name	Thai	Location
Wat Phumiban Watthana	วัดภูมิบาลวัฒนา	Moo1
Wat Si Sophon Thammathan	วัดศรีโสภณธรรมทาน	Moo2
Wat Phon Ngam	วัดโพนงาม	Moo4
Wat Sirisom Wanaram	วัดสิริสมวรวนาราม	Moo4
Wat Photharam	วัดโพธาราม	Moo5
Wat Pho Si	วัดโพธิ์ศรี	Moo6
Wat Udom Wanaram	วัดอุดมวนาราม	Moo6
Wat Wiriya Thong Champa	วัดวิริยะทองจำปา	Moo7
Wat Chotirot Thammakon	วัดโชติรสธรรมากร	Moo8
Wat Si Kaeo Wanaram	วัดศรีแก้ววนาราม	Moo9
Wat Thammaphirom	วัดธรรมาภิรมย์	Moo10
