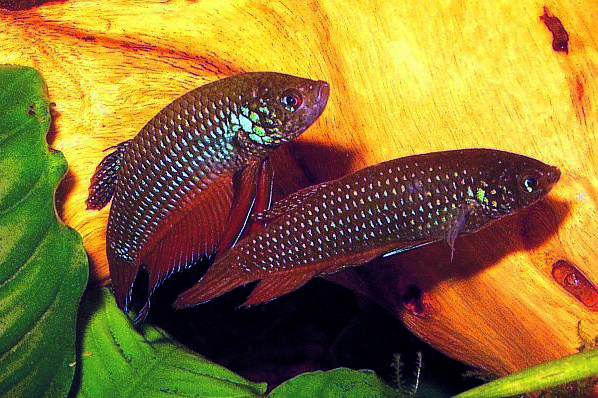

Conservation status
- Data Deficient (IUCN 3.1)

Scientific classification
- Kingdom: Animalia
- Phylum: Chordata
- Class: Actinopterygii
- Order: Anabantiformes
- Family: Osphronemidae
- Genus: Betta
- Species: B. smaragdina

Binomial name
- Betta smaragdina Ladiges, 1972

= Betta smaragdina =

Species of fish

Betta smaragdina, commonly known as the emerald green betta, blue betta or Mekong fighting fish (Thai: ปลากัดเขียว or ปลากัดอีสาน) is a species of gourami native to Southeast Asia. The species gets its green and blue colors due to refraction and interference of light that results from hexagonal crystals that are less than 0.5 micrometres. It is found in the aquarium trade.

== Description ==
Betta smaragdina grows to a maximum total length of 7 cm (2.8 in).

== Distribution ==
Betta smaragdina is native to Thailand and Laos, where it occurs in the basins of the Mekong and Chao Phraya Rivers, being frequently found in the Mun River and the Chi River in the region of Isan in Thailand and in Sông Bé binh phuoc province, binh duong Vietnam.

== Habitat ==
Betta smaragdina lives in still or sluggish bodies of water, including rice paddies, swamps, roadside ditches, streams and ponds. These bodies of water are usually shaded by vegetation and have a substrate composed of leaf litter, mud, or sand.

== Conservation status ==
Betta smaragdina is listed as data deficient by the IUCN. It is uncommon throughout its range and the population of the species is still decreasing. It is threatened by habitat destruction, pollution, and hybridization with escaped domesticated bettas.

== Diet ==
In the wild, Betta smaragdina feeds on terrestrial and aquatic invertebrates. In captivity, it is typically fed live or frozen food like Daphnia, Artemia or bloodworms.

== Breeding ==
Male individuals of Betta smaragdina will build a bubble nest before breeding. The temperature at which breeding typically occurs is 25.6 to 26.7 °C (78.1 to 80.1 °F). Males and females can live together and the male and female should already live together for breeding. When the female is interested in mating, she becomes lighter coloured and develops vertical bars. After mating, the male catches the falling eggs and places them in his bubble nest. In 1 to 2 days, the eggs hatch and continue absorb their yolk sack for 3 to 4 days. In 4 to 5 days, the fry become free swimming. Until this point in time, the male cares for them.

== In the aquarium ==
This species is often kept by Betta hobbyists but is rarely available in the aquarium trade. The "alien" hybrid betta is a hybrid of wild bettas in the Betta splendens complex, including B. smaragdina.

== Genetic diversity ==
Betta smaragdina 'Guitar' is a naturally occurring variety or even subspecies that lives only in the Bueng Khong Long, Bueng Kan province in northeast Thailand (Isan). What makes them differ from the normal B. smaragdina are their guitar like markings on the dorsal and caudal fin. As of coloring and sizing they are the same, except for the ventrals who tend to be longer. Research revealed a high degree of genetic diversity of this species which in future might result in the splitting of this species into multiple independent taxa (Kowasupat et al. 2013).

== Gallery ==
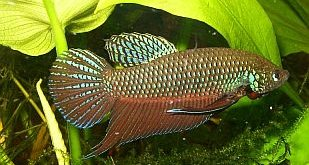
A male
