= Tha Kok Daeng =

Tha Kok Daeng ท่ากกแดง
- Tambon
- Interactive map of Tha Kok Daeng
- Coordinates: 17°52′56″N 103°47′08″E
- Country: Thailand
- Province: Bueng Kan
- Amphoe: Seka

Population (2020)
  - Total: 7,144
- Time zone: UTC+7 (TST)
- Postal code: 38150
- TIS 1099: 380403

Tha Kok Daeng (Thai: ท่ากกแดง) is a tambon (subdistrict) of Seka District, in Bueng Kan Province, Thailand. In 2020 it had a total population of 7,144 people.

== Geography ==
It lies on Thailand Route 222, south of Phon Charoen and north of Kham Ta Kla and southeast of the district capital of Seka.

== Administration ==
=== Central administration ===
The tambon is subdivided into 16 administrative villages (muban).

No.	Name	Thai
1.	Ban Tha Kok Daeng	บ้านท่ากกแดง
2.	Ban Nong Hing	บ้านหนองหิ้ง
3.	Ban Non Phra Sai	บ้านโนนพระทราย
4.	Ban Tha Kok Tong	บ้านท่ากกต้อง
5.	Ban Pho Noi	บ้านโพธิ์น้อย
6.	Ban Nong Bua Daeng	บ้านหนองบัวแดง
7.	Ban Non Sawan	บ้านโนนสวรรค์
8.	Ban Si Amnuai Phon	บ้านศรีอำนวยพร
9.	Ban Tha Dok Khun	บ้านท่าดอกคูณ
10.	Ban Nong Sim Phatthana	บ้านหนองสิมพัฒนา
11.	Ban Tha Kok Daeng Nuea	บ้านท่ากกแดงเหนือ
12.	Ban Siri Charoen	บ้านศิริเจริญ
13.	Ban Noen Phai	บ้านเนินไผ่
14.	Ban Tha Kok Daeng Klang	บ้านท่ากกแดงกลาง
15.	Ban Nong Bua Ngoen	บ้านหนองบัวเงิน
16.	Ban Chok Amnuai	บ้านโชคอำนวย

=== Local administration ===
The whole area of the subdistrict is covered by the subdistrict administrative organization (SAO) Tha Kok Daeng (องค์การบริหารส่วนตำบลท่ากกแดง).
