= Kham Na Di =

Kham Na Di คำนาดี
- Subdistrict
- Location within Thailand
- Coordinates: 18.2085°N 103.6478°E
- Country: Thailand
- Province: Bueng Kan
- District: Mueang Bueng Kan

Government
  - Type: Subdistrict Administrative Organization (SAO)

Area
  - Total: 65.56 km^{2} (25.31 sq mi)

Population (2022)
  - Total: 5,265
  - Density: 80/km^{2} (210/sq mi)
- Time zone: UTC+7 (ICT)
- Postal code: 38000
- Calling code: 042
- Geocode: 38011100
- Website: www.khamnadee.go.th/about

Kham Na Di is a subdistrict (tambon) in Mueang Bueng Kan District, in Bueng Kan Province, northeastern Thailand. As of 2022, it had a population of 5,265 people, with jurisdiction over eight villages.

== Geography ==
The topography of Kham Na Di subdistrict is lowland of sandy loam soil. Rubber plantations cover 32,780 rai ~ 52.45 square kilometres (20.25 sq mi) and rice cultivation covers 8,195 rai ~ 13.11 square kilometres (5.06 sq mi).

== Administration ==
=== Central government ===
The administration of ฺKham Na Di subdistrict (tambon) is responsible for an area that covers 40,975 rai ~ 65.56 square kilometres (25.31 sq mi) and consists of eight administrative villages (muban). As of 2022: 5,265 people.

Village	English	Thai	People
Moo1	Ban Kham Na Di	บ้านคำนาดี่	695
Moo2	Ban E-Haet	บ้านอีแฮต	674
Moo3	Ban Na Charoen	บ้านนาเจริญ	554
Moo4	Ban Huai Ruea Yai	บ้านห้วยเรือใหญ่	717
Moo5	Ban Don Kaew	บ้านดอนแก้ว	518
Moo6	Ban Non Insi Plaeng	บ้านโนนอินทร้แปลง	341
Moo7	Ban Chum Phu Thong	บ้านชุมภูทอง	994
Moo8	Ban Huai Phu Samakkhee	บ้านห้วยภูสามัคคี	772

=== Local government ===
Kham Na Di Subdistrict Administrative Organization - Kham Na Di SAO (Thai: องค์การบริหารตำบลคำนาดี, romanized: ongkan borihan suan tambon Kham Na Di) covers the whole Kham Na Di subdistrict.

== Temple ==
Kham Na Di subdistrict is home to the following active temple, where Theravada Buddhism is practised by local residents:

Temple name	Thai	Location
Wat Dan Samakkhee	วัดดานสามัคคี	Moo1
