= Bung Khla subdistrict =

Bung Khla บุ่งคล้า
- Tambon
- Interactive map of Bung Khla
- Coordinates: 18°17′43″N 103°59′42″E
- Country: Thailand
- Province: Bueng Kan
- Amphoe: Bung Khla

Population (2020)
  - Total: 5,216
- Time zone: UTC+7 (TST)
- Postal code: 38000
- TIS 1099: 380801

Bung Khla (Thai: บุ่งคล้า) is a tambon (subdistrict) of Bung Khla District, in Bueng Kan Province, Thailand. In 2020 it had a total population of 5,216 people.

== History ==
The subdistrict was created effective July 1, 1990 by splitting off 9 administrative villages from Nong Doen.

== Administration ==
=== Central administration ===
The tambon is subdivided into 9 administrative villages (muban).

No.	Name	Thai
1.	Ban Bung Khla	บ้านบุ่งคล้า
2.	Ban Bung Khla Thung	บ้านบุ่งคล้าทุ่ง
3.	Ban Bung Khla Nuea	บ้านบุ่งคล้าเหนือ
4.	Ban Na Chan	บ้านนาจาน
5.	Ban Don Chik	บ้านดอนจิก
6.	Ban Don Phaeng	บ้านดอนแพง
7.	Ban Kham Pia	บ้านขามเปี้ย
8.	Ban Sam Bon	บ้านซำบอน
9.	Ban Non Sa-at	บ้านโนนสะอาด

=== Local administration ===
The whole area of the subdistrict is covered by the subdistrict administrative organization (SAO) Bung Khla (องค์การบริหารส่วนตำบลบุ่งคล้า).
