= Tha Dok Kham =

Coordinates: 18°7′27″N 104°4′52″E

Tha Dok Kham ท่าดอกคำ
- Subdistrict
- Interactive map of Tha Dok Kham
- Country: Thailand
- Province: Bueng Kan
- District: Bueng Khong Long

Population (2010)
  - Total: 6,879
- Time zone: UTC+7 (ICT)
- Postal code: 38220
- TIS 1099: 380604

Tha Dok Kham is a sub-district (tambon) in Bueng Khong Long District, in Bueng Kan Province, northeastern Thailand. As of 2010, it had a population of 6,879 people and jurisdiction over 11 villages.
