= Na Sing =

Na Sing นาสิงห์
- Subdistrict
- Interactive map of Na Sing
- Country: Thailand
- Province: Bueng Kan
- District: Si Wilai District

Population (2010)
  - Total: 6,470
- Time zone: UTC+7 (ICT)
- Postal code: 38210
- TIS 1099: 380705

Na Sing is a sub-district (tambon) in Si Wilai District, in Bueng Kan Province, northeastern Thailand. As of 2010, it had a population of 6470 people, and has administrative jurisdiction over eight villages.

== Administration ==
The subdistrict is divided into eight administrative villages (muban):

No.	Name	Thai
1.	Ban Na Sing	บ้านนาสิงห์
2.	Ban Nonsavang	บ้านโนนสว่าง
3.	Ban Na Kham Khaen	บ้านนาคำแคน
4.	Ban Thung Phaniang	บ้านทุ่งพะเนียง
5.	Ban Huai Lueang	บ้านห้วยเหลือง
6.	Ban Sombun	บ้านสมบูรณ์
7.	Ban Si Savang	บ้านศรีสว่าง
8.	Ban Na Sing Nuea	บ้านนาสิงห์เหนือ
