= Pa Faek =

Pa Faek is the name of several subdistricts in Thailand:

- Pa Faek, Bueng Kan
- Pa Faek, Phayao
- Pa Faek, Sukhothai
