= Non Sila =

Non Sila may refer to

- Non Sila District, Khon Kaen province, Thailand
- Non Sila Subdistrict, Non Sila district, Khon Kaen province, Thailand
- Non Sila Subdistrict Municipality, Non Sila district, Khon Kaen province, Thailand
- Non Sila Subdistrict, Pak Khat district, Bueng Kan province, Thailand
- Non Sila Subdistrict, Sahatsakhan district, Kalasin province, Thailand
