= Wang Chomphu =

Wang Chomphu วังชมภู
- Subdistrict
- Location within Thailand
- Country: Thailand
- Province: Bueng Kan
- District: Phon Charoen District

Population (2010)
  - Total: 4,375
- Time zone: UTC+7 (ICT)
- Postal code: 38180
- TIS 1099: 380205

Wang Chomphu is a sub-district (tambon) in Phon Charoen District, in Bueng Kan Province, northeastern Thailand. As of 2010, it had a population of 4,375 people, with jurisdiction over eight villages.
