= Khok Kwang =

Khok Kwang โคกกว้าง
- Subdistrict
- Interactive map of Khok Kwang
- Country: Thailand
- Province: Bueng Kan
- District: Bung Khla District

Population (2010)
  - Total: 4,596
- Time zone: UTC+7 (ICT)
- Postal code: 38000
- TIS 1099: 380803

Khok Kwang is a sub-district (tambon) in Bung Khla District, in Bueng Kan Province, northeastern Thailand. As of 2010, it had a population of 4,596 people and jurisdiction over nine villages.
