= Nong Yong =

Nong Yong หนองยอง
- Subdistrict
- Interactive map of Nong Yong
- Country: Thailand
- Province: Bueng Kan
- District: Pak Khat District

Population (2010)
  - Total: 6,197
- Time zone: UTC+7 (ICT)
- Postal code: 38190
- TIS 1099: 380502

Nong Yong is a sub-district (tambon) in Pak Khat District, in Bueng Kan Province, northeastern Thailand. As of 2010, it had a population of 6,197 people, with jurisdiction over 11 villages.
