= Na Sawan =

Na Sawan นาสวรรค์
- Subdistrict
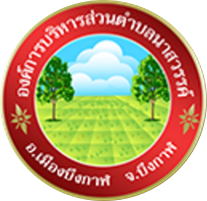
- Seal

- Location within Thailand
- Coordinates: 18.2538°N 103.6075°E
- Country: Thailand
- Province: Bueng Kan
- District: Mueang Bueng Kan

Government
  - Type: Subdstrict Administrative Organization (SAO)

Area
  - Total: 80.25 km^{2} (30.98 sq mi)

Population (2022)
  - Total: 7,814
  - Density: 97/km^{2} (250/sq mi)
- Time zone: UTC+7 (ICT)
- Postal code: 38000
- Calling code: 042
- Geocode: 38010700
- Website: www.nasawan.go.th

Na Sawan is a subdistrict (tambon) in Mueang Bueng Kan District, in Bueng Kan Province, northeastern Thailand. As of 2022, it had a population of 7,814 people, with jurisdiction over nine villages.

== Geography ==
The topography of Na Sawan subdistrict is plain, suitable for farming.

== Administration ==
=== Central government ===
The administration of ฺNa Sawan subdistrict (tambon) is responsible for an area that covers 80.25 square kilometres (30.98 sq mi) and consists of nine administrative villages (muban). As of 2022: 7,814 people.

Village	English	Thai	People
Moo1	Ban Na Sawan	บ้านนาสวรรค์	1,195
Moo2	Ban Kham Khaen	บ้านคำแคน	826
Moo3	Ban Non Swat	บ้านโนนสวาท	742
Moo4	Ban Nong Saeng	บ้านหนองแสง	1,045
Moo5	Ban Saen Suk	บ้านแสนสุข	776
Moo6	Ban Khok Sawang	บ้านโคกสว่าง	1,242
Moo7	Ban Nong To	บ้านหนองตอ	616
Moo8	Ban Na Waeng	บ้านนาแวง	533
Moo9	Ban Huai Bon Phatthana	บ้านห้วยบอนพัฒนา	839

=== Local government ===
Na Sawan Subdistrict Administrative Organization - Na Sawan SAO (Thai: องค์การบริหารตำบลนาสวรรค์, romanized: ongkan borihan suan tambon Na Sawan) covers the whole Na Sawan subdistrict.

== Temples ==
Na Sawan subdistrict is home to the following active temples, where Theravada Buddhism is practised by local residents:

Temple name	Thai	Location
Wat Na Sawan	วัดนาสวรรค์	Moo1
Wat Somtha Dhammakhun	วัดสมถธรรมคุณ	Moo7
