= Doen =

Doen may refer to:

- DOEN Foundation, a Dutch environmentalist foundation

== See also ==
- Nong Doen, a subdistrict of Thailand
- Down (disambiguation)
- Do (disambiguation)
