= Wis =

WIS (acronym) may stand for:

== Radio and television ==
- WIS (TV), a television station (channel 10) licensed to serve Columbia, South Carolina
- WVOC, a radio station in Columbia, South Carolina which held the call sign WIS from 1930–86

== Schools ==
- Walsh Intermediate School, a middle school in Connecticut, the United States
- Washington International School, in the District of Columbia, United States
- Weizmann Institute of Science, in Rehovot, Israel
- West Island School, a British high school in Hong Kong, China
- Windhoek International School, in Windhoek, Namibia
- Wellington International School, in Dubai, the United Arab Emirates

== Other ==
- Outer Hebrides (Western Isles), Scotland, Chapman code WIS
- Wisconsin, a U.S. state
- wisit, web-based integrating systems information technology
- Wedge imaging spectrometer, a type of imaging spectrometer
- WiS, the original name of the Vis pistol
- Book of Wisdom, one of the deuterocanonical books of the Bible
- Working Income Supplement, a former tax benefit administrated by the Government of Canada
