= Nangnang =

Nangnang or Naklang can have several meanings:

- Lelang Commandery
  - The ancient Korean peninsular polity
  - The commandery of the Han empire of China
- Nangnang-guyok, a district of Pyongyang, North Korea
- Nangnang, Bhutan, a town in Bumthang, Bhutan
- Na Klang (disambiguation), several places in Thailand

== See also ==
- Nangnangnangnang, the eleventh-season premiere of the American sitcom Two and a Half Men
