= Lao Thong =

Lao Thong เหล่าทอง
- Subdistrict
- Interactive map of Lao Thong
- Country: Thailand
- Province: Bueng Kan
- District: So Phisai District

Population (2010)
  - Total: 5,321
- Time zone: UTC+7 (ICT)
- Postal code: 38170
- TIS 1099: 380307

Lao Thong is a sub-district (tambon) in So Phisai District, in Bueng Kan Province, northeastern Thailand. As of 2010, it had a population of 5,321 people, with jurisdiction over nine villages.
