= Tham Charoen =

Tham Charoen ถ้ำเจริญ
- Subdistrict
- Interactive map of Tham Charoen
- Country: Thailand
- Province: Bueng Kan
- District: So Phisai District

Population (2010)
  - Total: 7,757
- Time zone: UTC+7 (ICT)
- Postal code: 38170
- TIS 1099: 380306

Tham Charoen is a sub-district (tambon) in So Phisai District, in Bueng Kan Province, northeastern Thailand. As of 2010, it had a population of 7,757 people, with jurisdiction over 11 villages.
