= Pho Mak Khaeng =

Pho Mak Khaeng โพธิ์หมากแข้ง
- Subdistrict
- Interactive map of Pho Mak Khaeng
- Country: Thailand
- Province: Bueng Kan
- District: Bueng Khong Long

Population (2015)
  - Total: 12,783
- Time zone: UTC+7 (ICT)
- Postal code: 38220
- TIS 1099: 380602

Pho Mak Khaeng (Thai: โพธิ์หมากแข้ง) is a tambon (sub-district) of Bueng Khong Long District, in Bueng Kan Province, Thailand. In 2015 it had a population of 12,783 people.

== Administration ==
=== Central administration ===
The tambon is divided into 16 administrative villages (mubans).

No.	Name	Thai
1.	Ban Pho Mak Khaeng	บ้านโพธิ์หมากแข้ง
2.	Ban Non Nam Thaeng	บ้านโนนหนามแท่ง
3.	Ban Non Sawan	บ้านโนนสวรรค์
4.	Ban Bua Khok	บ้านบัวโคก
5.	Ban Na Ang	บ้านนาอ่าง
6.	Ban Dong Sawang	บ้านดงสว่าง
7.	Ban Dong Chomphu	บ้านดงชมภู
8.	Ban Bua Khok Tai	บ้านบัวโคกใต้
9.	Ban Nong Sim	บ้านหนองสิม
10.	Ban Non Champa Thong	บ้านโนนจำปาทอง
11.	Ban Non Sila	บ้านโนนศิลา
12.	Ban Na San	บ้านนาสาร
13.	Ban Non Chomphu	บ้านโนนชมภู
14.	Ban Bua Khok Mai	บ้านบัวโคกใหม่
15.	Ban Nong Bua Ngam	บ้านหนองบัวงาม
16.	Ban Mai Phu Charoen	บ้านใหม่ภูเจริญ

=== Local administration ===
Governance of the sub-district is shared by two local governments:

- Subdistrict municipality (thesaban tambon) Bueng Khong Long (เทศบาลตำบลบึงโขงหลง)
- subdistrict administrative organization (SAO) Pho Mak Khaeng (องค์การบริหารส่วนตำบลโพธิ์หมากแข้ง)
