= Som Sanuk =

Som Sanuk สมสนุก
- Subdistrict
- Interactive map of Som Sanuk
- Country: Thailand
- Province: Bueng Kan
- District: Pak Khat District

Population (2010)
  - Total: 5,355
- Time zone: UTC+7 (ICT)
- Postal code: 38190
- TIS 1099: 380505

Som Sanuk is a sub-district (tambon) in Pak Khat District, in Bueng Kan Province, northeastern Thailand. As of 2010, it had a population of 5,355 people, with jurisdiction over eight villages.
