= Don Ya Nang =

Don Ya Nang ดอนหญ้านาง
- Subdistrict
- Interactive map of Don Ya Nang
- Country: Thailand
- Province: Bueng Kan
- District: Phon Charoen District

Population (2010)
  - Total: 4,979
- Time zone: UTC+7 (ICT)
- Postal code: 38180
- TIS 1099: 380202

Don Ya Nang is a sub-district (tambon) in Phon Charoen District, in Bueng Kan Province, northeastern Thailand. As of 2010, it had a population of 4,979 people, with jurisdiction over seven villages.
