= Nong Phan Tha =

Nong Phan Tha หนองพันทา
- Tambon
- Interactive map of Nong Phan Tha
- Coordinates: 18°06′27″N 103°24′44″E
- Country: Thailand
- Province: Bueng Kan
- Amphoe: So Phisai

Population (2020)
  - Total: 8,988
- Time zone: UTC+7 (TST)
- Postal code: 38170
- TIS 1099: 380302

Nong Phan Tha (Thai: หนองพันทา) is a tambon (subdistrict) of So Phisai District, in Bueng Kan Province, Thailand. In 2020 it had a total population of 8,988 people.

== History ==
The subdistrict was created effective March 1, 1967 by splitting off 13 administrative villages from So.

== Administration ==
=== Central administration ===
The tambon is subdivided into 12 administrative villages (muban).

No.	Name	Thai
1.	Ban Huai Luek	บ้านห้วยลึก
2.	Ban Huai Luek Nuea	บ้านห้วยลึกเหนือ
3.	Ban Phon Thong	บ้านโพนทอง
4.	Ban Non Kaeo	บ้านโนนแก้ว
5.	Ban Nong Na Kham	บ้านหนองนาคำ
6.	Ban Nong Phan Tha	บ้านหนองพันทา
7.	Ban Khilek Yai	บ้านขี้เหล็กใหญ่
8.	Ban Pa Rai	บ้านป่าไร่
9.	Ban Non Muang	บ้านโนนม่วง
10.	Ban Non Pho Si	บ้านโนนโพธิ์ศรี
11.	Ban Phatthana Phon	บ้านพัฒนาพร
12.	Ban Non Kaeo Noi	บ้านโนนแก้วน้อย

=== Local administration ===
The whole area of the subdistrict is covered by the subdistrict administrative organization (SAO) Nong Phan Tha (องค์การบริหารส่วนตำบลหนองพันทา).
