= Pak Khat subdistrict =

Coordinates: 18°18′N 103°18′E

Pak Khat ปากคาด
- Subdistrict
- Interactive map of Pak Khat
- Country: Thailand
- Province: Bueng Kan
- District: Pak Khat District

Population (2010)
  - Total: 8,058
- Time zone: UTC+7 (ICT)
- Postal code: 38190
- TIS 1099: 380501

Pak Khat is a sub-district (tambon) in Pak Khat District, in Bueng Kan Province, northeastern Thailand. As of 2010, it had a population of 8,058 people, with jurisdiction over 18 villages.
