= Khok Kong =

Khok Kong โคกก่อง
- Subdistrict
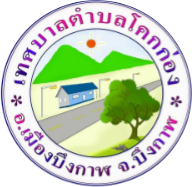
- Seal

- Location within Thailand
- Coordinates: 18.292°N 103.7864°E
- Country: Thailand
- Province: Bueng Kan
- District: Mueang Bueng Kan

Government
  - Type: Subdistrict municipality

Area
  - Total: 59.0 km^{2} (22.8 sq mi)

Population (2022)
  - Total: 7,121
  - Density: 120/km^{2} (310/sq mi)
- Time zone: UTC+7 (ICT)
- Postal code: 38000
- Calling code: 042
- Geocode: 38010600
- Website: kokkong.go.th

Khok Kong is a subdistrict (tambon) in Mueang Bueng Kan district, in Bueng Kan province, Isan (northeastern Thailand). As of 2022, it had a population of 7,121 people, with jurisdiction over nine villages.

== Administration ==
=== Central government ===
The administration of ฺKhok Kong subdistrict (tambon) is responsible for an area that covers 36,842 rai ~ 59.0 square kilometres (22.8 sq mi) and consists of nine administrative villages (muban). As of 2022: 7,121 people.

Village	English	Thai	People
Moo1	Ban Khok Kong	บ้านโคกก่อง	680
Moo2	Ban Non Sa	บ้านโนนสา	927
Moo3	Ban Na Kham	บ้านนาคำ	1,140
Moo4	Ban Huai Dok Mai	บ้านห้วยดอกไม้	746
Moo5	Ban Tha In Plaeng	บ้านท่าอินทร์แปลง	618
Moo6	Ban Non Wang Yaim	บ้านโนนวังเยี่ยม	429
Moo7	Ban Khok Kong Tai	บ้านโคกก่องใต้	640
Moo8	Ban Non Sai Thong	บ้านโนนไทรทอง	572
Moo9	Ban Rai Sukhsan	บ้านไร่สุขสันต์	1,369

=== Local government ===
Khok Kong subdistrict municipality (Thai: เทศบาลตำบลโคกก่อง, romanized: thetsaban tambon Khok Kong) covers the whole Khok Kong subdistrict.

== Temple ==
Khok Kong subdistrict is home to the following active temples, where Theravada Buddhism is practised by local residents:

Temple name	Thai	Location
Wat Phon Sawang	วัดโพนสว่าง	Moo1
Wat Phon Ngam	วัดโพนงาม	Moo2
Wat Phon Kaeo	วัดโพนแก้ว	Moo3
Wat Si Mongkhon Samran	วัดสรีมงคลสำราญ	Moo4
Wat Intharam	วัดอินทาราม	Moo5
Wat Non Wang Yai	วัดโนนวังใหญ่	Moo6
Wat Chanthawaree	วัดจันทวารี่	Moo7
