= Dong Bang, Bueng Kan =

Dong Bang ดงบัง
- Tambon
- Interactive map of Dong Bang
- Coordinates: 18°02′43″N 104°07′51″E
- Country: Thailand
- Province: Bueng Kan
- Amphoe: Bueng Khong Long

Population (2020)
  - Total: 6,575
- Time zone: UTC+7 (TST)
- Postal code: 38220
- TIS 1099: 380603

Dong Bang (Thai: ดงบัง) is a tambon (subdistrict) of Bueng Khong Long District, in Bueng Kan Province, Thailand. In 2020 it had a total population of 6,575 people.

== Administration ==
=== Central administration ===
The tambon is subdivided into 11 administrative villages (muban).

No.	Name	Thai
1.	Ban Tha Si Khai	บ้านท่าสีไค
2.	Ban Dong Suang	บ้านดงสรวง
3.	Ban Lao Luang	บ้านเหล่าหลวง
4.	Ban Dong Thon	บ้านดงโทน
5.	Ban Dong Bang	บ้านดงบัง
6.	Ban Non Sawat	บ้านโนนสวาท
7.	Ban Non Sombun	บ้านโนนสมบูรณ์
8.	Ban Dong Ruea	บ้านดงเรือ
9.	Ban Lao Dok Mai	บ้านเหล่าดอกไม้
10.	Ban Dong Bang Tai	บ้านดงบังใต้
11.	Ban Tha Si Khai Nuea	บ้านท่าสีไคเหนือ

=== Local administration ===
The whole area of the subdistrict is covered by the subdistrict administrative organization (SAO) Dong Bang (องค์การบริหารส่วนตำบลดงบัง).
