= Na Saeng =

Na Saeng can refer to several locations in Thailand:

- Na Saeng, Lampang
- Na Saeng, Bueng Kan
