= Nong Hua Chang =

Coordinates: 18.0939°N 103.5908°E

Nong Hua Chang หนองหัวช้าง
- Subdistrict
- Interactive map of Nong Hua Chang
- Country: Thailand
- Province: Bueng Kan
- District: Phon Charoen District

Population (2010)
  - Total: 7,721
- Time zone: UTC+7 (ICT)
- Postal code: 38180
- TIS 1099: 380204

Nong Hua Chang is a sub-district (tambon) in Phon Charoen District, in Bueng Kan Province, northeastern Thailand. As of 2010, it had a population of 7,721 people, with jurisdiction over 11 villages.
