= Non Sombun =

Non Sombun (Thai: โนนสมบูรณ์) is the name of several places in Thailand.

- Non Sombun subdistrict, Mueang Bueng Kan, Bueng Kan
- Non Sombon subdistrict, Na Chaluai, Ubon Ratchathani
- Non Sombun subdistrict, Det Udom, Ubon Ratchathani
- Non Sombun subdistrict, Soeng Sang, Nakhon Ratchasima
- Non Sombun subdistrict, Ban Haet, Khon Kaen
- Non Sombun subdistrict, Khao Suan Kwang, Khon Kaen (also a municipality)
- Non Sombun municipality, Soeng Sang, Nakhon Ratchasima, covering parts of the subdistrict
