= So, Bueng Kan =

So โซ่
- Tambon
- Interactive map of So
- Coordinates: 18°04′34″N 103°26′25″E
- Country: Thailand
- Province: Bueng Kan
- Amphoe: So Phisai

Population (2020)
  - Total: 15,880
- Time zone: UTC+7 (TST)
- Postal code: 38170
- TIS 1099: 380301

So (Thai: โซ่) is a tambon (subdistrict) of So Phisai District, in Bueng Kan Province, Thailand. In 2020 it had a total population of 15,880 people.

== Administration ==
=== Central administration ===
The tambon is subdivided into 18 administrative villages (muban).

No.	Name	Thai
1.	Ban So	บ้านโซ่
2.	Ban Ang Thong	บ้านอ่างทอง
3.	Ban Sam Liam	บ้านสามเหลี่ยม
4.	Ban Non Chat	บ้านโนนชาด
5.	Ban Sai Ngam	บ้านไทรงาม
6.	Ban Non Phu Din	บ้านโนนภูดิน
7.	Ban Khok Sa-at	บ้านโคกสะอาด
8.	Ban Huai Sai	บ้านห้วยทราย
9.	Ban Tha Sawat	บ้านท่าสวาท
10.	Ban Non Manpla	บ้านโนนมันปลา
11.	Ban Nong Takai	บ้านหนองตาไก้
12.	Ban Huai Songkhram	บ้านห้วยสงคราม
13.	Ban Nong Ian	บ้านหนองเอี่ยน
14.	Ban Tha Li	บ้านท่าหลี่
15.	Ban Sai Thong	บ้านทรายทอง
16.	Ban Isan Phatthana	บ้านอีสานพัฒนา
17.	Ban Non Si Sa-nga	บ้านโนนศรีสง่า
18.	Ban Na Ruang Thong	บ้านนารวงทอง

=== Local administration ===
The area of the subdistrict is shared by 2 local governments.

- the subdistrict municipality (Thesaban Tambon) So Phisai (เทศบาลตำบลโซ่พิสัย)
- the subdistrict administrative organization (SAO) So (องค์การบริหารส่วนตำบลโซ่)
