= Si Wilai district =

Si Wilai ศรีวิไล
- District
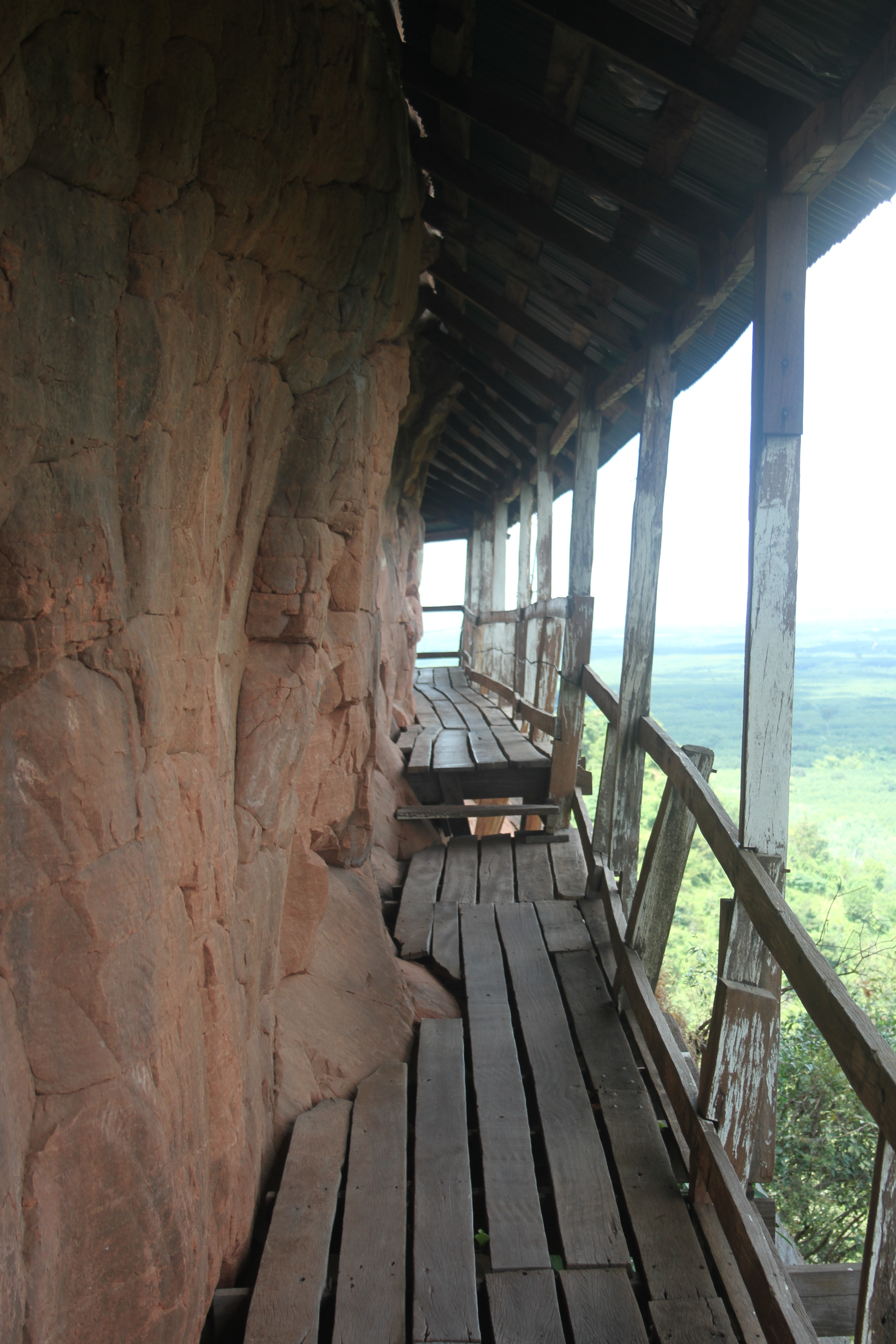
- Walkway on the side of Phu Thok mountain

- District location in Bueng Kan province
- Coordinates: 18°10′36″N 103°45′0″E
- Country: Thailand
- Province: Bueng Kan
- Seat: Si Wilai
- Subdistrict: 5
- Muban: 50
- District established: 1988

Area
  - Total: 327.9 km^{2} (126.6 sq mi)

Population (2010)
  - Total: 38,899
  - Density: 151.5/km^{2} (392/sq mi)
- Time zone: UTC+7 (ICT)
- Postal code: 43210
- Geocode: 3807

Si Wilai (Thai: ศรีวิไล, pronounced [sǐː wí.lāj]) is a district (amphoe) in the eastern part of Bueng Kan province, northeastern Thailand.

== Geography ==
Neighboring districts are (from the north clockwise): Mueang Bueng Kan, Seka, and Phon Charoen. Phu Thok, the emblematic mountain of the province, is in this district.

== History ==
The minor district (king amphoe) Si Wilai was established on 1 January 1988, when four tambons, Si Wilai, Chumphu Phon, Na Saeng, and Na Sabaeng were split off from Bueng Kan district. It was upgraded to a full district on 4 July 1994.

== Administration ==
The district is divided into five sub-districts (tambons), which are further subdivided into 50 villages (mubans). The sub-district municipality (thesaban tambon) Si Wilai covers the whole tambon Si Wilai. There are a further four tambon administrative organizations (TAO).

No.	Name	Thai	Villages	Pop.
1.	Si Wilai	ศรีวิไล	12	10,846
2.	Chumphu Phon	ชุมภูพร	12	7,475
3.	Na Saeng	นาแสง	9	7,920
4.	Na Sabaeng	นาสะแบง	9	6,188
5.	Na Sing	นาสิงห์	8	6,470
