= So Phisai district =

So Phisai โซ่พิสัย
- District
- District location in Bueng Kan province
- Coordinates: 18°4′42″N 103°26′36″E
- Country: Thailand
- Province: Bueng Kan
- Seat: So
- Tambons: 7
- Mubans: 89
- District established: 1972

Area
  - Total: 985.262 km^{2} (380.412 sq mi)

Population (2010)
  - Total: 69,450
  - Density: 68.6/km^{2} (178/sq mi)
- Time zone: UTC+7 (ICT)
- Postal code: 38170
- Geocode: 3803

So Phisai (Thai: โซ่พิสัย, pronounced [sôː pʰí.sǎj]) is a district (amphoe) of Bueng Kan province, northeastern Thailand.

== History ==
The minor district (king amphoe) So Phisai was established on 1 March 1972, when the three tambons So, Si Chomphu, and Nong Phan Tha were split off from Phon Phisai district. It was upgraded to a full district on 13 April 1977.

== Geography ==
Neighboring districts are (from the west clockwise): Fao Rai and Rattanawapi of Nong Khai province; Pak Khat, Mueang Bueng Kan, and Phon Charoen of Bueng Kan Province; and Ban Muang of Sakon Nakhon province.

== Administration ==
The district is divided into seven sub-districts (tambons), which are further subdivided into 89 villages (mubans). So Phisai is a sub-district municipality (thesaban tambon) which covers parts of tambon So. There are a further seven tambon administrative organizations (TAO).

No.	Name	Villages	Thai	Pop.
1.	So	โซ่	17	16,589
2.	Nong Phan Tha	หนองพันทา	11	8,659
3.	Si Chomphu	ศรีชมภู	15	12,165
4.	Kham Kaeo	คำแก้ว	13	9,576
5.	Bua Tum	บัวตูม	13	9,383
6.	Tham Charoen	ถ้ำเจริญ	11	7,757
7.	Lao Thong	เหล่าทอง	9	5,321
