= Bueng Khong Long subdistrict =

Bueng Khong Long บึงโขงหลง
- Subdistrict
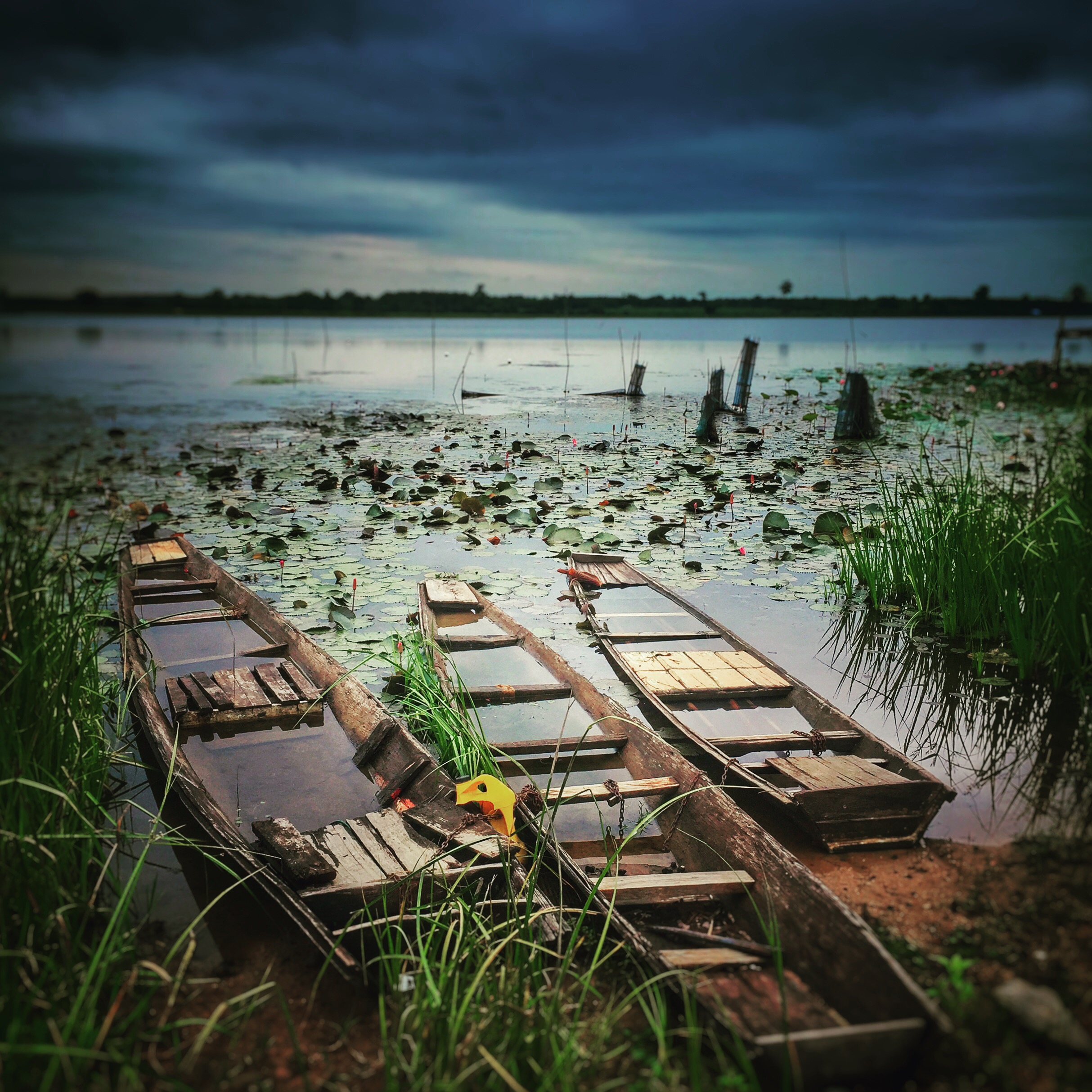
- Interactive map of Bueng Khong Long
- Coordinates: 17°58′0″N 104°2′42″E
- Country: Thailand
- Province: Bueng Kan
- District: Bueng Khong Long

Population (2010)
  - Total: 10,245
- Time zone: UTC+7 (ICT)
- Postal code: 38220
- TIS 1099: 380601

Bueng Khong Long is a sub-district (tambon) in Bueng Khong Long district in Bueng Kan province, northeastern Thailand. As of 2010, it had a population of 10,245 people, with jurisdiction over 17 villages.

Both the district and sub-district are named after a reservoir south of Bueng Khong Long town which is a breeding ground for aquatic birds and spawning ground for fish.
