= Phon Charoen district =

Phon Charoen พรเจริญ
- District
- District location in Bueng Kan province
- Coordinates: 18°1′54″N 103°42′30″E
- Country: Thailand
- Province: Bueng Kan
- Seat: Phon Charoen
- Tambons: 7
- Mubans: 58
- District established: 1976

Area
  - Total: 362.4 km^{2} (139.9 sq mi)

Population (2010)
  - Total: 42,109
  - Density: 113/km^{2} (290/sq mi)
- Time zone: UTC+7 (ICT)
- Postal code: 38180
- Geocode: 3802

Phon Charoen (Thai: พรเจริญ, pronounced [pʰɔ̄ːn t͡ɕā.rɤ̄ːn]) is a district (amphoe) of Bueng Kan province, northeastern Thailand.

== History ==
The minor district (king amphoe) Phon Charoen was established on 16 November 1976 by splitting two tambons from Bueng Kan district. It was upgraded to a full district on 13 July 1981.

== Geography ==
Neighboring districts are (from the west clockwise) So Phisai, Mueang Bueng Kan, Si Wilai, and Seka of Bueng Kan Province, and Kham Ta Kla and Ban Muang of Sakon Nakhon province.

== Administration ==
The district is divided into seven sub-districts (tambons), which are further subdivided into 58 villages (mubans). There are two sub-district municipalities (thesaban tambons): Phon Charoen covers parts of tambon Phon Charoen, and Don Ya Nang the whole tambon Don Ya Nang. There are a further six tambon administrative organizations (TAO).

No.	Name	Thai	Villages	Pop.
1.	Si Chomphu	ศรีชมภู	7	4,755
2.	Don Ya Nang	ดอนหญ้านาง	7	4,979
3.	Phon Charoen	พรเจริญ	11	10,254
4.	Nong Hua Chang	หนองหัวช้าง	11	7,721
5.	Wang Chomphu	วังชมภู	8	4,375
6.	Pa Faek	ป่าแฝก	7	5,519
7.	Si Samran	ศรีสำราญ	7	4,506
