= Hin Sam Wan =

Rock formation in Bueng Kan, Thailand

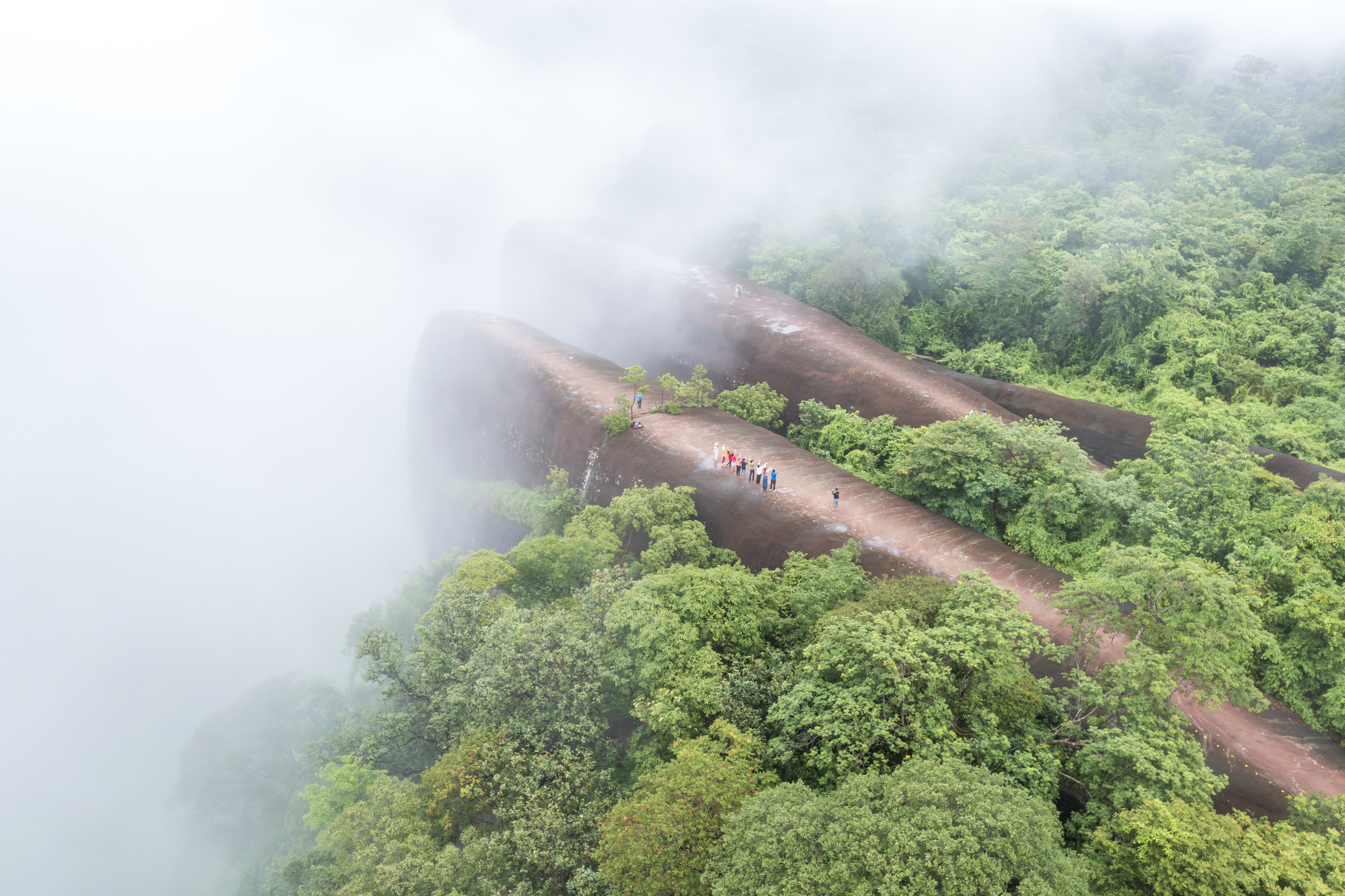

Highest point
- Elevation: 300 m (980 ft)
- Coordinates: 18.2510130°N 103.8139376°E

Geography
- Location within Thailand
- Location: Phou Sing, Bueng Kan Province, Thailand

Hin Sam Wan (Thai: หินสามวาฬ, lit. 'three whales rock') is a 75-million-year-old rock formation protruding out of a mountain in Phou Sing, Bueng Kan province, Thailand, near the Mekong River. It is so named because, from certain angles, the rocks look like a family of whales. Only two of the rocks (the "mother whale" and "father whale") are accessible by foot; the "baby whale" cannot be reached.
