= Si Chomphu, So Phisai =

Si Chomphu ศรีชมภู
- Subdistrict
- Location within Thailand
- Country: Thailand
- Province: Bueng Kan
- District: So Phisai District

Population (2010)
  - Total: 12,165
- Time zone: UTC+7 (ICT)
- Postal code: 38170

Si Chomphu is a sub-district (tambon) in So Phisai District, in Bueng Kan Province, northeastern Thailand. As of 2010, it had a population of 12,165 people, with jurisdiction over 15 villages.
