= Pa Faek, Bueng Kan =

Coordinates: 18.0627°N 103.7358°E

Pa Faek ป่าแฝก
- Subdistrict
- Interactive map of Pa Faek
- Country: Thailand
- Province: Bueng Kan
- District: Phon Charoen District

Population (2010)
  - Total: 5,519
- Time zone: UTC+7 (ICT)
- Postal code: 38180
- TIS 1099: 380206

Pa Faek is a sub-district (tambon) in Phon Charoen District, in Bueng Kan Province, northeastern Thailand. As of 2010, it had a population of 5,519 people, with jurisdiction over seven villages.
