= Bung Khla district =

Bung Khla บุ่งคล้า
- District
- District location in Bueng Kan province
- Coordinates: 18°18′6″N 103°58′24″E
- Country: Thailand
- Province: Bueng Kan
- Seat: Nong Doen
- Tambons: 3
- Mubans: 25
- District established: 1991

Government
  - District officer: Premsak Kiranon (เปรมศักดิ์ กีรานนท์)

Area
  - Total: 243.6 km^{2} (94.1 sq mi)

Population (2010)
  - Total: 13,037
  - Density: 52/km^{2} (130/sq mi)
- Time zone: UTC+7 (ICT)
- Postal code: 38000
- Geocode: 3808

Bung Khla (Thai: บุ่งคล้า, pronounced [bùŋ kʰláː]; Northeastern Thai: บุ่งคล้า, pronounced [búŋ kʰâː]) is a district (amphoe) of Bueng Kan province, northeastern Thailand.

== History ==
The minor district (king amphoe) was split off from Bueng Kan district on 1 April 1991. It was upgraded to a full district on 5 December 1996.

== Geography ==
Neighboring districts are (from the south clockwise) Bueng Khong Long, Seka, and Mueang Bueng Kan of Bueng Kan Province. To the east across the Mekong river is the Laotian province Bolikhamxai.

The Phu Wua Wildlife Sanctuary is in the district.

== Administration ==
The district is divided into three sub-districts (tambons), which are further subdivided into 25 villages (mubans). There are no municipal (thesaban) areas, and three tambon administrative organizations (TAO).

No.	Name	Thai	Villages	Pop.
1.	Bung Khla	บุ่งคล้า	9	4,884
2.	Nong Doen	หนองเดิ่น	7	3,557
3.	Khok Kwang	โคกกว้าง	9	4,596

== Economy ==
The district's location on a bank of the Mekong has made it a prime agricultural area. Tomatoes, in particular, are one of the more profitable crops.
