= Bueng Khong Long district =

Bueng Khong Long บึงโขงหลง
- District
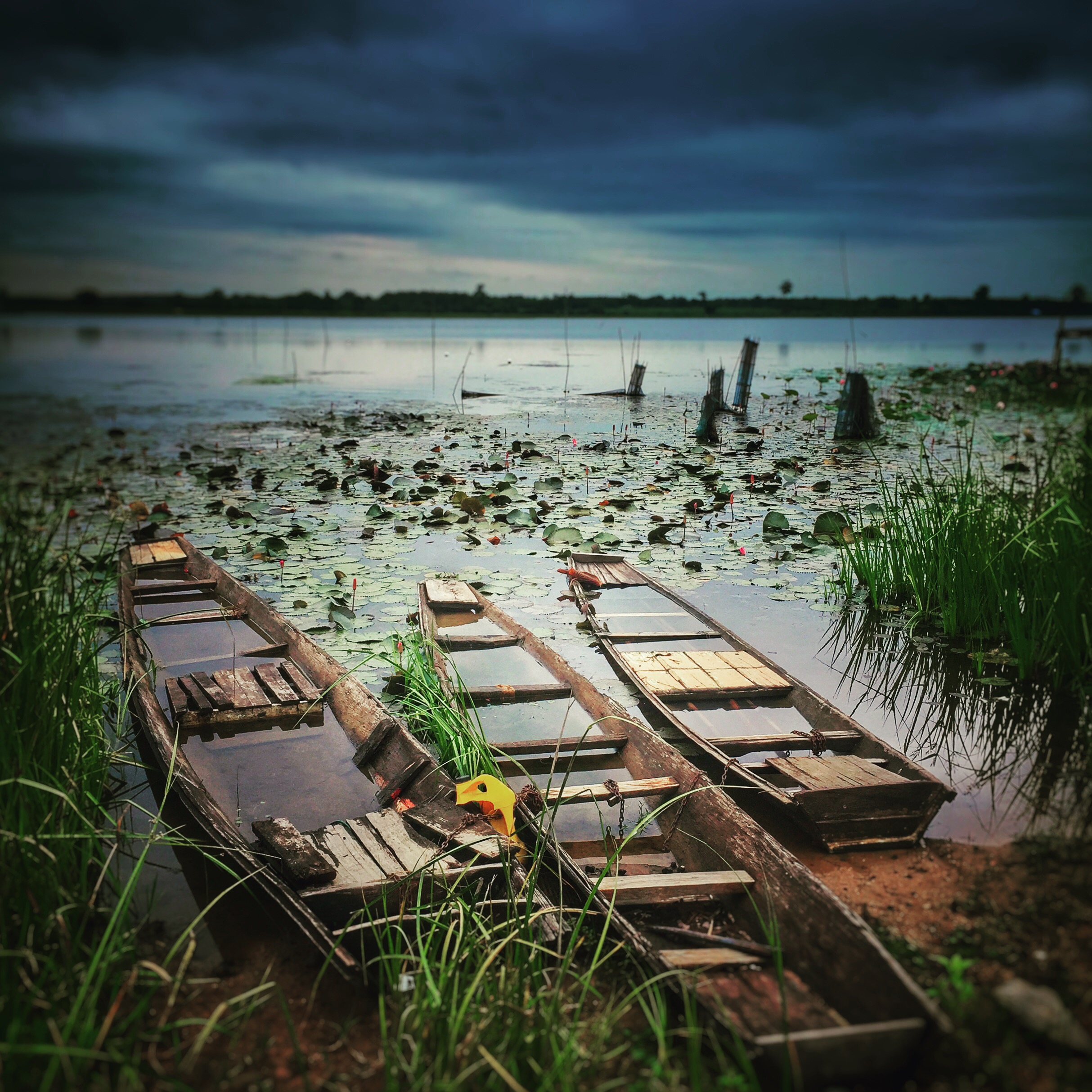
- Lake near Bueng Khong Long village

- District location in Bueng Kan province
- Coordinates: 17°58′0″N 104°2′42″E
- Country: Thailand
- Province: Bueng Kan
- Seat: Bueng Khong Long
- Subdistricts: 4
- Mubans: 51
- District established: 1986

Area
  - Total: 398.152 km^{2} (153.727 sq mi)

Population (2015)
  - Total: 37,300
  - Density: 87.2/km^{2} (226/sq mi)
- Time zone: UTC+7 (ICT)
- Postal code: 38220
- Geocode: 3806

Bueng Khong Long (Thai: บึงโขงหลง, pronounced [bɯ̄ŋ kʰǒːŋ lǒŋ]) is a district (amphoe) of Bueng Kan province, northeastern Thailand.

Both this district and its Bueng Khong Long subdistrict are named after a reservoir south of Bueng Khong Long town. The reservoir was created in the 1980s under a royal initiative by the late-King Bhumibol Adulyadej to provide irrigation for farmers as well as to enhance biodiversity. The lake's wetlands are an important stopover point for migrating birds, and also a spawning ground for fish. Fish are a key protein source for locals.

== History ==
The minor district was split off from Seka district on 7 January 1986. It was upgraded to a full district on 4 November 1993.

== Geography ==
Neighboring districts are (from the south clockwise): Ban Phaeng and Na Thom of Nakhon Phanom province; Seka and Bung Khla of Bueng Kan Province. To the east across the Mekong River is the Laotian province Bolikhamxai.

== Administration ==
=== Central administration ===
Bueng Khong Long district is divided into four sub-districts (tambons), which are further subdivided into 57 administrative villages (mubans).

No.	Name	Thai	Villages	Pop.
1.	Bueng Khong Long	บึงโขงหลง	17	10,805
2.	Pho Mak Khaeng	โพธิ์หมากแข้ง	16	12,783
3.	Dong Bang	ดงบัง	11	6,509
4.	Tha Dok Kham	ท่าดอกคำ	13	7,203

=== Local administration ===
There are two sub-district municipalities (thesaban tambons) in the district:

- Bueng Khong Long (Thai: เทศบาลตำบลบึงโขงหลง) consisting of parts of sub-districts Bueng Khong Long and Pho Mak Khaeng.
- Bueng Ngam (Thai: เทศบาลตำบลบึงงาม) consisting of parts of sub-district Bueng Khong Long.

There are three sub-district administrative organizations (SAO) in the district:

- Pho Mak Khaeng (Thai: องค์การบริหารส่วนตำบลโพธิ์หมากแข้ง) consisting of parts of sub-district Pho Mak Khaeng.
- Dong Bang (Thai: องค์การบริหารส่วนตำบลดงบัง) consisting of the sub-district Dong Bang.
- Tha Dok Kham (Thai: องค์การบริหารส่วนตำบลท่าดอกคำ) consisting of the sub-district Tha Dok Kham.
