= Pak Khat district =

Pak Khat ปากคาด
- District
- District location in Bueng Kan province
- Coordinates: 18°17′54″N 103°18′24″E
- Country: Thailand
- Province: Bueng Kan
- Seat: Non Sila
- Subdistricts: 6
- Mubans: 64
- District established: 1978

Area
  - Total: 218.10 km^{2} (84.21 sq mi)

Population (2010)
  - Total: 33,973
  - Density: 151.5/km^{2} (392/sq mi)
- Time zone: UTC+7 (ICT)
- Postal code: 38190
- Geocode: 3805

Pak Khat (Thai: ปากคาด, pronounced [pàːk kʰâːt]) is a district (amphoe) in the eastern part of Bueng Kan province, northeastern Thailand.

== Geography ==
Neighboring districts are (from the east clockwise) Bueng Kan and So Phisai of Bueng Kan Province, and Rattanawapi of Nong Khai province. To the northwest across the Mekong river is the Laotian province Bolikhamxai.

== History ==
The minor district (king amphoe) was established on 1 October 1978, when it was split off from Phon Phisai district. It was upgraded on 20 March 1986.

== Administration ==
The district is divided into six sub-districts (tambons), which are further subdivided into 64 villages (mubans). The township (thesaban tambon) Pak Khat covers parts of tambons Pak Khat and Non Sila. There are a further six tambon administrative organizations (TAO).

No.	Name	Thai	Villages	Pop.
1.	Pak Khat	ปากคาด	18	8,058
2.	Nong Yong	หนองยอง	11	6,197
3.	Na Kang	นากั้ง	7	3,979
4.	Non Sila	โนนศิลา	12	6,502
5.	Som Sanuk	สมสนุก	8	5,355
6.	Na Dong	นาดง	8	3,882
