= Nong Doen =

Nong Doen หนองเดิ่น
- Tambon
- Interactive map of Nong Doen
- Coordinates: 18°19′06″N 103°58′00″E
- Country: Thailand
- Province: Bueng Kan
- Amphoe: Bung Khla

Population (2020)
  - Total: 3,797
- Time zone: UTC+7 (TST)
- Postal code: 38000
- TIS 1099: 380802

Nong Doen (Thai: หนองเดิ่น) is a tambon (subdistrict) of Bung Khla District, in Bueng Kan Province, Thailand. In 2020 it had a total population of 3,797 people.

== Administration ==
=== Central administration ===
The tambon is subdivided into 7 administrative villages (muban).

No.	Name	Thai
1.	Ban Nong Doen Tha	บ้านหนองเดิ่นท่า
2.	Ban Nong Doen Nuea	บ้านหนองเดิ่นเหนือ
3.	Ban Nong Doen Thung	บ้านหนองเดิ่นทุ่ง
4.	Ban Nong Khan Kha	บ้านหนองคังคา
5.	Ban Huai Lep Mue	บ้านห้วยเล็บมือ
6.	Ban Phu Sawat	บ้านภูสวาท
7.	Ban Thep Mi Chai	บ้านเทพมีชัย

=== Local administration ===
The whole area of the subdistrict is covered by the subdistrict administrative organization (SAO) Nong Doen (องค์การบริหารส่วนตำบลหนองเดิ่น).
