= Na Klang =

Na Klang may refer to:

- Na Klang District in Nongbua Lamphu Province, Thailand
- Na Klang, Nakhon Ratchasima, subdistrict of Sung Noen District, Nakhon Ratchasima, Thailand

== See also ==
- Na Kang, subdistrict in Pak Khat District, Bueng Kan, Thailand
- List of tambon in Thailand (N–O)
