= Non Sila, Bueng Kan =

Coordinates: 15°58′N 102°40′E

Non Sila โนนศิลา
- Subdistrict
- Interactive map of Non Sila
- Country: Thailand
- Province: Bueng Kan
- District: Pak Khat District

Population (2010)
  - Total: 6,502
- Time zone: UTC+7 (ICT)
- Postal code: 38190
- TIS 1099: 380504

Non Sila is a sub-district (tambon) in Pak Khat District, in Bueng Kan Province, northeastern Thailand. As of 2010, it had a population of 6,502 people, with jurisdiction over 12 villages.
