= Na Kang =

Na Kang นากั้ง
- Subdistrict
- Interactive map of Na Kang
- Coordinates: 18.394279°N 103.281935°E
- Country: Thailand
- Province: Bueng Kan
- District: Pak Khat District

Population (2010)
  - Total: 3,979
- Time zone: UTC+7 (ICT)
- Postal code: 38190
- TIS 1099: 380503

Na Kang is a sub-district (tambon) in Pak Khat District, in Bueng Kan Province, northeastern Thailand. As of 2010, it had a population of 3,979 persons, with jurisdiction over seven villages.
