= Na Saeng, Bueng Kan =

Na Saeng นาแสง
- Subdistrict
- Interactive map of Na Saeng
- Country: Thailand
- Province: Bueng Kan
- District: Si Wilai District

Population (2010)
  - Total: 7,920
- Time zone: UTC+7 (ICT)
- Postal code: 38210
- TIS 1099: 380703

Na Saeng is a sub-district (tambon) in Si Wilai District, in Bueng Kan Province, northeastern Thailand. As of 2010, it had a population of 7,920 people, with jurisdiction over nine villages.
