= Non Sawang, Mueang Bueng Kan =

Non Sawang โนนสว่ง
- Subdistrict
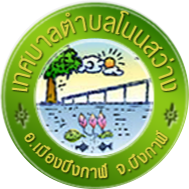
- Seal

- Location within Thailand
- Coordinates: 18.3641°N 103.4813°E
- Country: Thailand
- Province: Bueng Kan
- District: Mueang Bueng Kan

Government
  - Type: Subdistrict municipality

Area
  - Total: 66.8 km^{2} (25.8 sq mi)

Population (2022)
  - Total: 6,896
  - Density: 103/km^{2} (270/sq mi)
- Time zone: UTC+7 (ICT)
- Postal code: 38000
- Calling code: 042
- Geocode: 38010300
- Website: www.nonsawanglocal.go.th

Non Sawang (Thai: โนนสว่าง) is a subdistrict (tambon) in Mueang Bueng Kan district, in Bueng Kan province, Isan (northeastern Thailand). As of 2022, it had a population of 6,896 people and has jurisdiction over eleven villages.

== History ==
The subdistrict formerly known as Nong Keng subdistrict, changed its name into Non Sawang subdistrict in 2011.

== Geography ==
In general, the upland is interspersed with plains, which are characterized by hilly ridges.

== Administration ==
=== Central government ===
The administration of Non Sawang subdistrict (tambon) is responsible for an area that covers 41,750 rai ~ 66.8 square kilometres (25.8 sq mi) and consists of eleven administrative villages (muban).
As of 2022: 6,896 people.

Village	English	Thai	People
Moo 1	Ban Non Sawang	บ้านสว่าง	1,077
Moo 2	Ban Chai Badan	บ้านชัยบาดาล	564
Moo 3	Ban Santhawee	บ้านสรรทวี	584
Moo 4	Ban Na Dee	บ้านนาดี	716
Moo 5	Ban Don Por	บ้านดอนปอ	725
Moo 6	Ban Nong Din Dam	บ้านหนองดินดำ	460
Moo 7	Ban Burapha	บ้านบูรพา	782
Moo 8	Ban Nong Hai	บ้านหนองไฮ	256
Moo 9	Ban Phon Niyom	บ้านพรนิยม	755
Moo 10	Ban Non Ngam	บ้านโนนงาม	456
Moo 11	Ban Non Doo	บ้านโนนดู่	521

=== Local government ===
Non Sawang subdistrict municipality (Thai: เทศบาลตำบลโนนสว่าง, romanized: thesaban tambon Non Sawang) covers the whole Non Sawang subdistrict.

== Temple ==
Non Sawang subdistrict is home to the following active temples, where Theravada Buddhism is practised by local residents:

Temple name	Thai	Location
Wat Tham Si Wilai Wanaram	วัดถ้ำศรีวิไลย์วนาราม	Moo1
Wat Sawang Samran Thammakhun	วัดสว่างสำราญธรรมคุณ	Moo7
Wat Non Ngam Kham Wasi Phiratalai	วัดโนนงามคำวาสีภิรถาลัย	Moo10
