= Highway 222 (Thailand) =

Road in Thailand

National Highway 222
- ทางหลวงแผ่นดินหมายเลข 222
- ถนนสายพังโคน–บึงกาฬ; Phang Khon - Bueng Kan Road

Route information
- Length: 128.756 km (80.005 mi)

Major junctions
- North end: Hwy 22 AH15/ Hwy 227, Phang Khon, Sakon Nakhon
- South end: Hwy 212 AH121, Mueang Bueng Kan, Bueng Kan

Location
- Country: Thailand

Highway system
- Highways in Thailand; Motorways; Asian Highways

Highway 222 is a highway of northeastern Thailand. It begins at Phang Khon in Sakhon Nakhon Province at 17°23′20″N 103°43′17″E, where it meets Highway 227 and Highway 22 (Nittayo Road) and ends near the Mekong River on the Lao border in the north at Bueng Kan in Bueng Kan Province at 18°21′39″N 103°38′47″E, where it joins Highway 212.
