= Mueang Bueng Kan district =

Mueang Bueng Kan เมืองบึงกาฬ
- District
- District location in Bueng Kan province
- Coordinates: 18°21′29″N 103°39′11″E
- Country: Thailand
- Province: Bueng Kan
- Seat: Bueng Kan

Area
  - Total: 791.9 km^{2} (305.8 sq mi)

Population (2012)
  - Total: 89,978
  - Density: 105.5/km^{2} (273/sq mi)
- Time zone: UTC+7 (ICT)
- Postal code: 38000
- Geocode: 3801

Mueang Bueng Kan (Thai: เมืองบึงกาฬ, pronounced [mɯ̄a̯ŋ bɯ̄ŋ kāːn]) is a capital district (amphoe mueang) of Bueng Kan province, northeastern Thailand. It is 759 km north-northeast of Bangkok.

== History ==
The district was originally named Chai Buri (ไชยบุรี) and was a part of Nakhon Phanom province. In 1917 it was reassigned to Nong Khai, and in 1939 it was renamed Bueng Kan.

On 3 August 2010, a proposal to separate Bueng Kan province from Nong Khai province was approved by Thai government. On 22 March 2011, the "Act Establishing Changwat Bueng Kan, BE 2554 (2011)" was published in the Government Gazette. The district became the capital district (amphoe mueang) of the new province, and therefore renamed to Amphoe Mueang Bueng Kan by section 4 of the act.

On occasions during its history, especially during the 1970s and 1980s, there have been some conflicts with Lao people on the border. On 23 April 1975, the people's armed forces in Bueng Kan destroyed an enemy stronghold, killing 12 and Thai authorities reportedly admitted that 17 were killed eventually out of about 50. In the early-1980s two patrol boats of the Thai KPL reportedly opened fire and two Lao soldiers were arrested in Bueng Kan.

== Etymology ==
Bueng (TH: บึง) means "swamp" or "marsh". Kan (TH: กาฬ) is Thai for the Hindu goddess Kali; as an adjective it may mean 'black' and as a noun, 'black mark of death'.

== Geography ==
Neighboring districts are (from the east clockwise) Bung Khla, Seka, Si Wilai, Phon Charoen, So Phisai, and Pak Khat of Bueng Kan Province. To the north across the Mekong River is the province of Bolikhamsai province in Laos.

Transport

Building of the Fifth Thai–Lao Friendship Bridge began in 2020. Construction of the bridge at about 4 km west of the city centre is expected to take 3 years for a completion in 2023. The project will link the cities of Bueng Kan in Thailand and Bolikhamxai in Laos across the Mekong River. Its cost will be around US$130.3 million. Thailand has agreed to payUS$25.47 million and Laos is covering about US$46.13 million.. The bridge will enable Vietnam to be reached by road from Thailand through Laos over a distance of only 150 km. Already existing Thai-Lao Friendship Bridges link Nong Khai province with Vientiane Prefecture (First Thai–Lao Friendship Bridge; Mukdahan with Savannakhet (Second Thai–Lao Friendship Bridge); Nakhon Phanom with Thakhek (Third Thai–Lao Friendship Bridge); and Chiang Rai province with Houayxay (Fourth Thai–Lao Friendship Bridge).

== Administration ==
The district is divided into 12 sub-districts (tambons), which are further subdivided into 131 villages (mubans). Bueng Kan is a town municipality (thesaban mueang) which covers tambon Bueng Kan and Wisit. Non Kheng, Ho Kham, Khok Kong, Khai Si and Noeng Loeng are sub-district municipalities each covering the whole same-named sub-district. There are a further five tambon administrative organizations (TAO) for those sub-districts not covered by municipalities.

No.	Name	Thai	Villages	Pop.
1.	Bueng Kan	บึงกาฬ	11	9,999
2.	Non Sombun	โนนสมบูรณ์	13	9,903
3.	Non Sawang	โนนสว่าง	11	6,739
4.	Ho Kham	หอคำ	14	7,116
5.	Nong Loeng	หนองเลิง	13	8,547
6.	Khok Kong	โคกก่อง	9	6,901
7.	Na Sawan	นาสวรรค์	9	7,535
8.	Khai Si	ไคสี	10	5,294
9.	Chaiyaphon	ชัยพร	13	8,227
10.	Wisit	วิศิษฐ์	13	9,557
11.	Kham Na Di	คำนาดี	8	5,075
12.	Pong Pueai	โป่งเปือย	7	5,085

Missing numbers are tambon which now form the districts Bung Khla and Si Wilai.
