= Bueng Kan =

Bueng Kan บึงกาฬ
- Town municipality
- Location within Thailand
- Coordinates: 18.3254°N 103.6704°E
- Country: Thailand
- Province: Bueng Kan
- District: Mueang Bueng Kan
- Established: 5 August 2020

Government
  - Type: Town municipality

Area
  - Total: 95.19 km^{2} (36.75 sq mi)

Population (2022)
  - Total: 20,103
  - Density: 211/km^{2} (550/sq mi)
- Time zone: UTC+7 (ICT)
- Postal code: 38000
- Calling code: 042
- DOPA code: 3898
- Website: www.buengkhanml.go.th

Bueng Kan (Thai: บึงกาฬ, pronounced [bɯ̄ŋ kāːn]) is a town municipality (thesaban mueang) in Mueang Bueng Kan district, in Bueng Kan province, Isan (northeastern Thailand). It is the district capital and is on the Mekong River, opposite the Laotian town of Pakxan of Bolikhamsai province. It lies at the junction of Highways 212 and 222, 136 kilometres (85 mi) northeast of Nong Khai and 750 kilometres (466 mi) northeast of Bangkok. The economy is based on agriculture, with para rubber as the principal crop, and tourism.

== Toponymy ==
Bueng (บึง) means marsh; Kan (กาฬ) is associated with the Hindu deity Kāla, or the colour black.

== History ==
The settlement became a sanitary district in 1956. Like all sanitary districts, it was upgraded to sub-district municipality in 1999.
Bueng Kan was formerly part of Nong Khai Province until the formal establishment of the new province of the same name on 23 March 2011.
On 25 March 2020, the Ministry of Interior announce to dissolve Wisit subdistrict municipality and Bueng Kan subdistrict administrative organization (SAO) and combine the two with Bueng Kan subdistrict municipality. Also upgrade the status of the latter to Bueng Kan town municipality. Published in Royal Gazette, volume 137, special section 179 Ngor, date 5 August 2020 and effective on the same date.

== Geography ==
Wisit subdistrict, west part of Bueng Kan town municipality are plains interspersed with undulating, uneven slopes. Bueng Kan subdistrict, most of the east part of Bueng Kan town municipality is lowland with watersources, such as Nong Bueng Kan, Nong Fang Daeng and Huai Kan Ya.

== Climate ==
Climate data for Pakxan (1990–2019)
Month	Jan	Feb	Mar	Apr	May	Jun	Jul	Aug	Sep	Oct	Nov	Dec	Year
Mean daily maximum °C (°F)	29.0 (84.2)	30.8 (87.4)	32.6 (90.7)	33.9 (93.0)	32.9 (91.2)	32.1 (89.8)	31.5 (88.7)	31.5 (88.7)	31.8 (89.2)	31.8 (89.2)	30.6 (87.1)	28.7 (83.7)	31.4 (88.6)
Daily mean °C (°F)	22.6 (72.7)	24.5 (76.1)	26.9 (80.4)	28.7 (83.7)	28.6 (83.5)	28.4 (83.1)	28.0 (82.4)	28.0 (82.4)	27.9 (82.2)	27.2 (81.0)	25.3 (77.5)	22.9 (73.2)	26.6 (79.9)
Mean daily minimum °C (°F)	16.2 (61.2)	18.2 (64.8)	21.1 (70.0)	23.4 (74.1)	24.3 (75.7)	24.6 (76.3)	24.4 (75.9)	24.4 (75.9)	23.9 (75.0)	22.6 (72.7)	20.0 (68.0)	17.0 (62.6)	21.7 (71.0)
Average precipitation mm (inches)	10 (0.4)	28 (1.1)	53 (2.1)	124 (4.9)	401 (15.8)	690 (27.2)	796 (31.3)	640 (25.2)	431 (17.0)	113 (4.4)	17 (0.7)	5 (0.2)	3,308 (130.3)
Average relative humidity (%)	67.9	63.4	66.1	67.0	72.7	76.6	80.7	81.4	78.1	72.7	68.3	64.7	71.6
Mean monthly sunshine hours	221.6	192.7	240.4	205.9	157.3	96.7	78.5	84.2	141.3	202.5	231.2	218.5	2,070.8
Source 1: Food and Agriculture Organization of the United Nations
Source 2: Bureau of Meteorology (sun 1938–1944)SeaDelt (humidity 2016–2022)

== Administration ==
=== Local government ===
The administration of Bueng Kan town municipality (Thai: เทศบาลเมืองบึงกาฬ, romanized: thetsaban mueang Bueng Kan) is responsible for the combined area of Wisit and Bueng Kan subdistricts, that covers 59,494 rai ~ 95.19 square kilometres (36.75 sq mi) and consists of total 24 administrative villages (muban). As of 2022: 20,103 people.
The town municipality is divided into three districts (khet).

Villages of Wisit subdistrict	Villages of Bueng Kan subdistrict

Village	District 3
Moo3	Ban Nong Waeng
Moo4	Ban Na Pan
Moo5	Ban Nong Na Saeng
Moo6	Ban Lao Thawon
Moo8	Ban Huai Dok Mai
Moo10	Ban Saen Charoen
Moo11	Ban Don Charoen
Moo12	Ban Na Suksan
Moo13	Ban Chak Thip Samakkhee
Moo10	Ban San Samran

Village	District 1
Moo1	Ban Bueng Kan Nuea
Moo2	Ban Phan Lam
Moo7	Ban Wisit
Moo9	Ban Na Nuea
Moo1	Ban Bueng Kan Klang
Moo2	Ban Si Sophon

Village	District 2
Moo3	Ban Bueng Kan Tai
Moo4	Ban Na Non
Moo5	Ban Tha Krai
Moo6	Ban Tha Pho
Moo7	Ban Dong Mak Yang
Moo8	Ban Bueng Sawan
Moo9	Ban San Prasert
Moo11	Ban San Suk

== Transportation ==
The city is connected to many major cities by day and night airconditioned express buses. The journey to Udon Thani takes around 3 hours 45 minutes, and Bangkok is from 10 hours 30 minutes to 12 hours away depending on company and route.

Udon Thani International Airport with direct flights (under normal conditions) to Chiang Mai, Pattaya U-Tapao, Phuket, and both Bangkok airports, is at 200 km by road from the city. Sakon Nakhon regional airport at 172 km with flights to Bangkok (Don Mueang) at 172 km.

The nearest rail connection is Udon Thani railway station in the centre of Udon city.

Building of the fifth Thai–Lao Friendship Bridge began in 2021. Construction of the bridge at about 4 km west of the city centre is expected to take 3 years for a completion in 2023. The project will link the cities of Bueng Kan in Thailand and Bolikhamxai in Laos across the Mekong River. Its cost will be around US$130.3 million. Thailand has agreed to pay US$25.47 million and Laos is covering about US$46.13 million. The bridge will enable Vietnam to be reached by road from Thailand through Laos over a distance of 150 km. Already existing Thai-Lao Friendship Bridges link Nong Khai province with Vientiane Prefecture (First Thai–Lao Friendship Bridge); Mukdahan with Savannakhet (Second Thai–Lao Friendship Bridge); Nakhon Phanom with Thakhek (Third Thai–Lao Friendship Bridge); and Chiang Rai province with Houayxay (Fourth Thai–Lao Friendship Bridge).
