= Postal codes in Thailand =

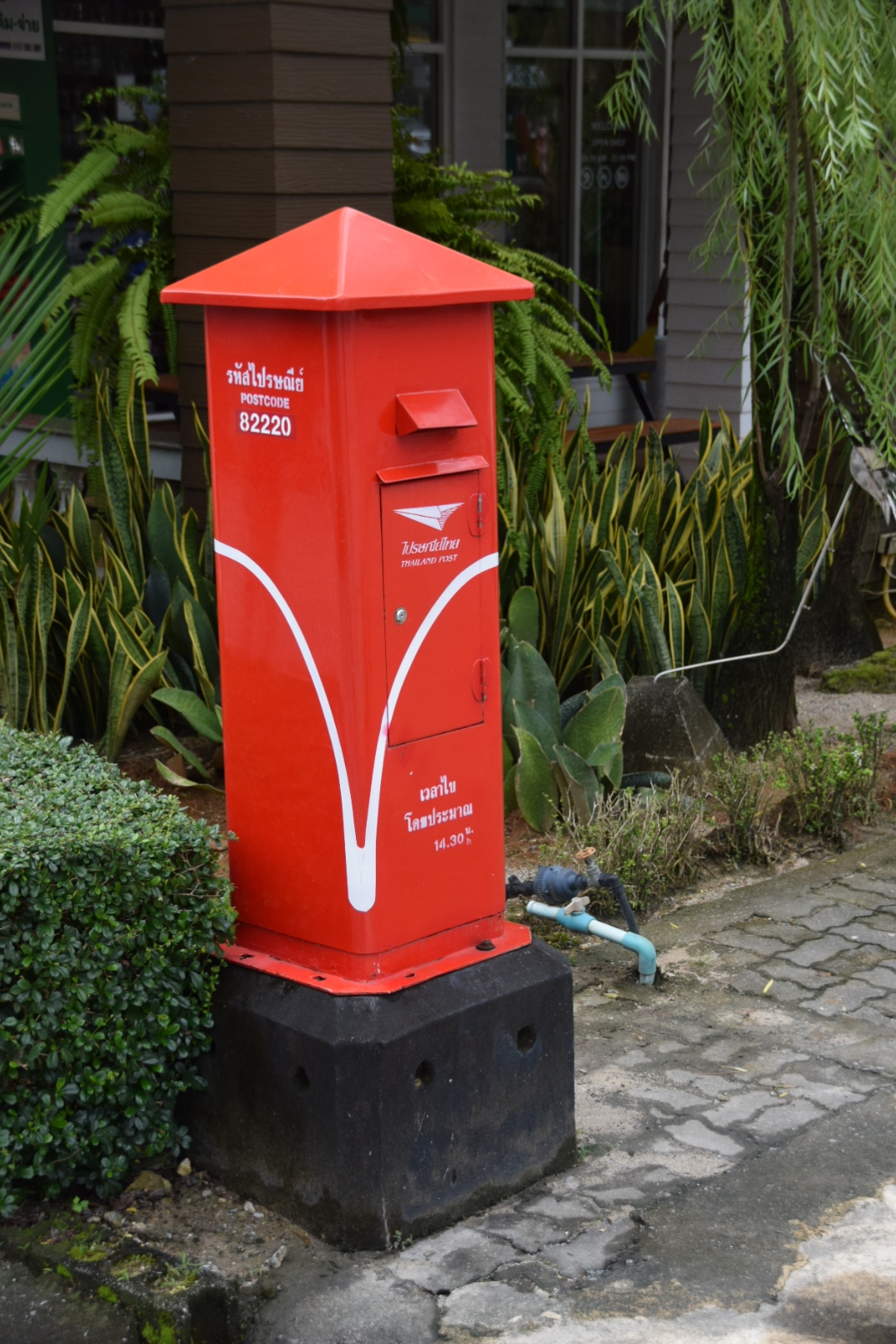
Postal code of a given location can be found on the side of Thai postal box there. In the picture, this is 82220.

Postal codes in Thailand are five digit numbers. The first two digits of the postal code denote the province or special administrative area (e.g., 43120 Phon Phisai, Nong Khai), while the last 3 digits represent the post office within the province. There are exceptions, for example, Bangkok and Samut Prakan province shared the first two digits 10xxx. It is typical to use postal code ended with zero 0 because they are assigned to post office that are responsible for delivering mail to the district (amphoe or khet). For example, mails to Dusit district destinations uses postal code 10300 except within Chitralada Palace where postal code 10303 is used. 10300 is postal code of Dusit Post Office which handles the delivery throughout Dusit district while 10303 is postal code of Chitralada Palace Post Office which does not deliver mails outside the palace. Other post offices in Dusit district exist, such as Bang Krabu Post Office with postal code 10301, the code used for mails to be delivered to P.O. Box in the post office.

Postcodes in Thailand were introduced in February 1982. They are issued by the Ministry of Digital Economy and Society (MDES).

Postcode
| Province (Changwat) | | District (Amphoe) | |
| XX | | XXX | |
Not in the postcode in Thailand
| Subdistrict (Tambon) | Village (Muban) | Road (Thanon) | Plot/house; 888/26 |

== Postal zones in Thailand ==
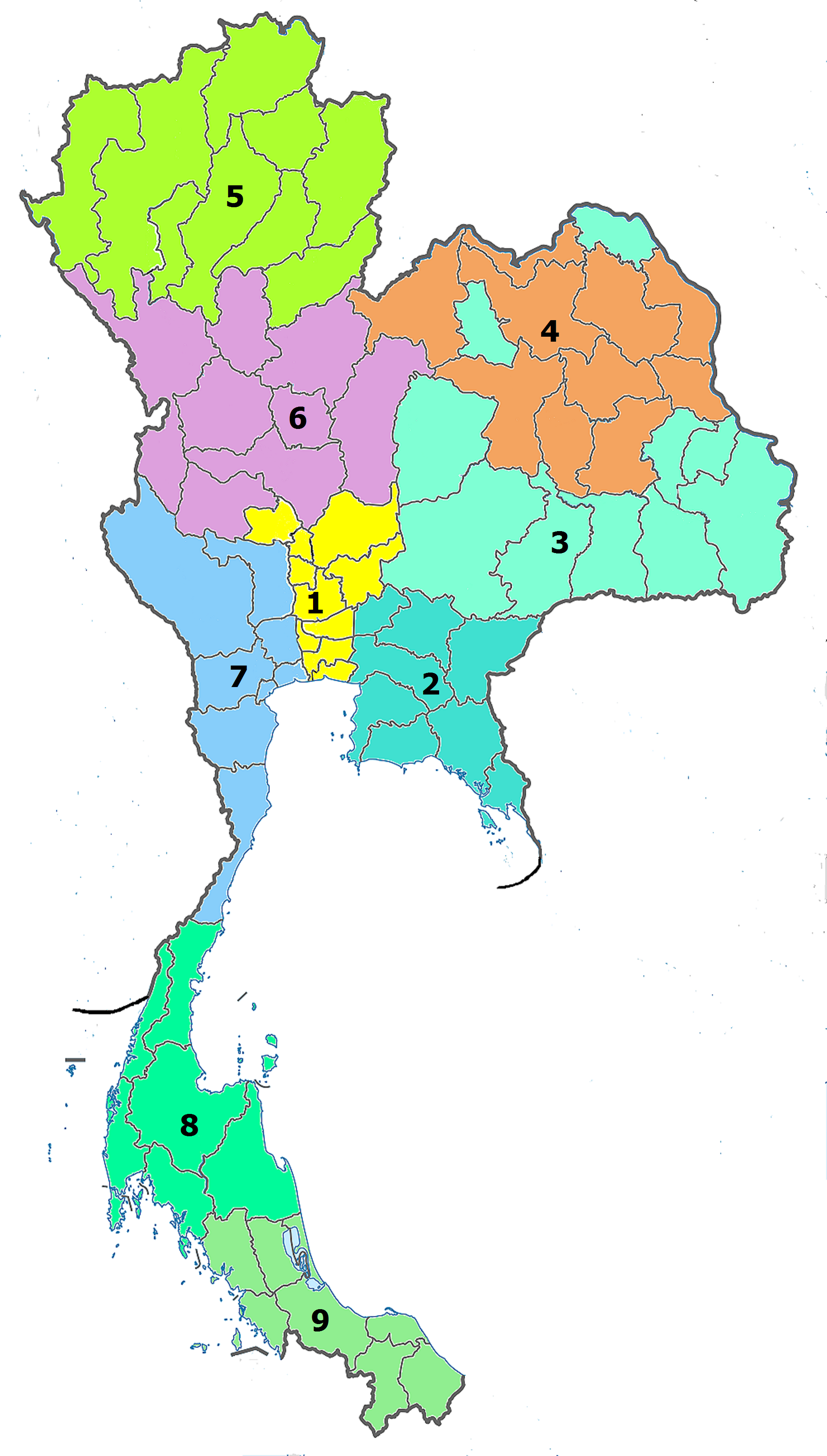

Postal zone is the first digit of postal code. It is numbered from 1 to 9. Nong Bua Lamphu province and Bueng Kan province have to use postal zone 3 despite its location because at the time of their establishment, postal zone 4 was fully used.

Postal zones
| Postcode | Zone |
|---|---|
| 10xxx - 18xxx | 1: Central zone |
| 20xxx - 27xxx | 2: Eastern zone |
| 30xxx - 39xxx | 3: Northeastern part 1 |
| 40xxx - 49xxx | 4: Northeastern part 2 |
| 50xxx - 58xxx | 5: Upper Northern zone |
| 60xxx - 67xxx | 6: Lower Northern zone |
| 70xxx - 77xxx | 7: Lower Central zone |
| 80xxx - 86xxx | 8: Southern zone |
| 90xxx - 96xxx | 9: Southern border zone |

== Province and special administrative area ==
Listed below are the first 2 digits of codes assigned to each province or special administrative area.

=== Special Governed Districts (Khet Phiset) ===
- Bangkok uses codes from 10xxx (including Samut Prakan)
- Pattaya uses codes 20xxx (Chonburi province postal codes)

=== Province codes ===
1: Central zone
| Province | Postcode |
|---|---|
| Bangkok | 10xxx |
| Samut Prakan | 10xxx |
| Nonthaburi | 11xxx |
| Pathum Thani | 12xxx |
| Ayutthaya | 13xxx |
| Ang Thong | 14xxx |
| Lopburi | 15xxx |
| Sing Buri | 16xxx |
| Chai Nat | 17xxx |
| Saraburi | 18xxx |

2: Eastern zone
| Province | Postcode |
|---|---|
| Chonburi | 20xxx |
| Rayong | 21xxx |
| Chanthaburi | 22xxx |
| Trat | 23xxx |
| Chachoengsao | 24xxx |
| Prachinburi | 25xxx |
| Nakhon Nayok | 26xxx |
| Sa Kaeo | 27xxx |

3: Northeastern part 1
| Province | Postcode |
|---|---|
| Nakhon Ratchasima | 30xxx |
| Buriram | 31xxx |
| Surin | 32xxx |
| Sisaket | 33xxx |
| Ubon Ratchathani | 34xxx |
| Yasothon | 35xxx |
| Chaiyaphum | 36xxx |
| Amnat Charoen | 37xxx |
| Bueng Kan | 38xxx |
| Nong Bua Lamphu | 39xxx |

4: Northeastern part 2
| Province | Postcode |
|---|---|
| Khon Kaen | 40xxx |
| Udon Thani | 41xxx |
| Loei | 42xxx |
| Nong Khai | 43xxx |
| Maha Sarakham | 44xxx |
| Roi Et | 45xxx |
| Kalasin | 46xxx |
| Sakon Nakhon | 47xxx |
| Nakhon Phanom | 48xxx |
| Mukdahan | 49xxx |

5: Upper Northern zone
| Province | Postcode |
|---|---|
| Chiang Mai | 50xxx |
| Lamphun | 51xxx |
| Lampang | 52xxx |
| Uttaradit | 53xxx |
| Phrae | 54xxx |
| Nan | 55xxx |
| Phayao | 56xxx |
| Chiang Rai | 57xxx |
| Mae Hong Son | 58xxx |

6: Lower Northern zone
| Province | Postcode |
|---|---|
| Nakhon Sawan | 60xxx |
| Uthai Thani | 61xxx |
| Kamphaeng Phet | 62xxx |
| Tak | 63xxx |
| Sukhothai | 64xxx |
| Phitsanulok | 65xxx |
| Phichit | 66xxx |
| Phetchabun | 67xxx |

7: Lower Central zone
| Province | Postcode |
|---|---|
| Ratchaburi | 70xxx |
| Kanchanaburi | 71xxx |
| Suphan Buri | 72xxx |
| Nakhon Pathom | 73xxx |
| Samut Sakhon | 74xxx |
| Samut Songkhram | 75xxx |
| Phetchaburi | 76xxx |
| Prachuap Khiri Khan | 77xxx |

8: Southern zone
| Province | Postcode |
|---|---|
| Nakhon Si Thammarat | 80xxx |
| Krabi | 81xxx |
| Phang Nga | 82xxx |
| Phuket | 83xxx |
| Surat Thani | 84xxx |
| Ranong | 85xxx |
| Chumphon | 86xxx |

9: Southern border zone
| Province | Postcode |
|---|---|
| Songkhla | 90xxx |
| Satun | 91xxx |
| Trang | 92xxx |
| Phatthalung | 93xxx |
| Pattani | 94xxx |
| Yala | 95xxx |
| Narathiwat | 96xxx |

== Numbering within the province ==
The third and fourth digits are used to distinguish different areas within the province. The last digit is zero for the main post office handling the mail delivery, while other post offices in the area have other numbers.

Outside of Bangkok and Samut Prakan, the postal code xx000 is the postal code for the main post office of Amphoe mueang of each province. The remaining area number runs in the sequence xx110, xx120, xx130, ..., xx190, xx210, ...

Bangkok's number system replaces the previous mail addressing system of Bangkok 1, Bangkok 2, etc. The Bangkok 1 area becomes 10100, Bangkok 2 becomes 10200, etc. There is special case that Bangkok 10 becomes 10310, while Bangkok 11, 12, etc. becomes 10110, 10120, etc. There is no postal area 10000, as the number is assigned to Bangkok Mail Center.

== Mail facilities ==
In 2018 Thailand Post allocated 10 billion baht to construct two new "automated sorting" centers, one in Chonburi Province and the other in Wang Noi District, Ayutthaya Province. Its goal is to fully automate postal and delivery operations as well back office procedures in 2021.
