= Bueng Kan province =

Bueng Kan บึงกาฬ
- Province
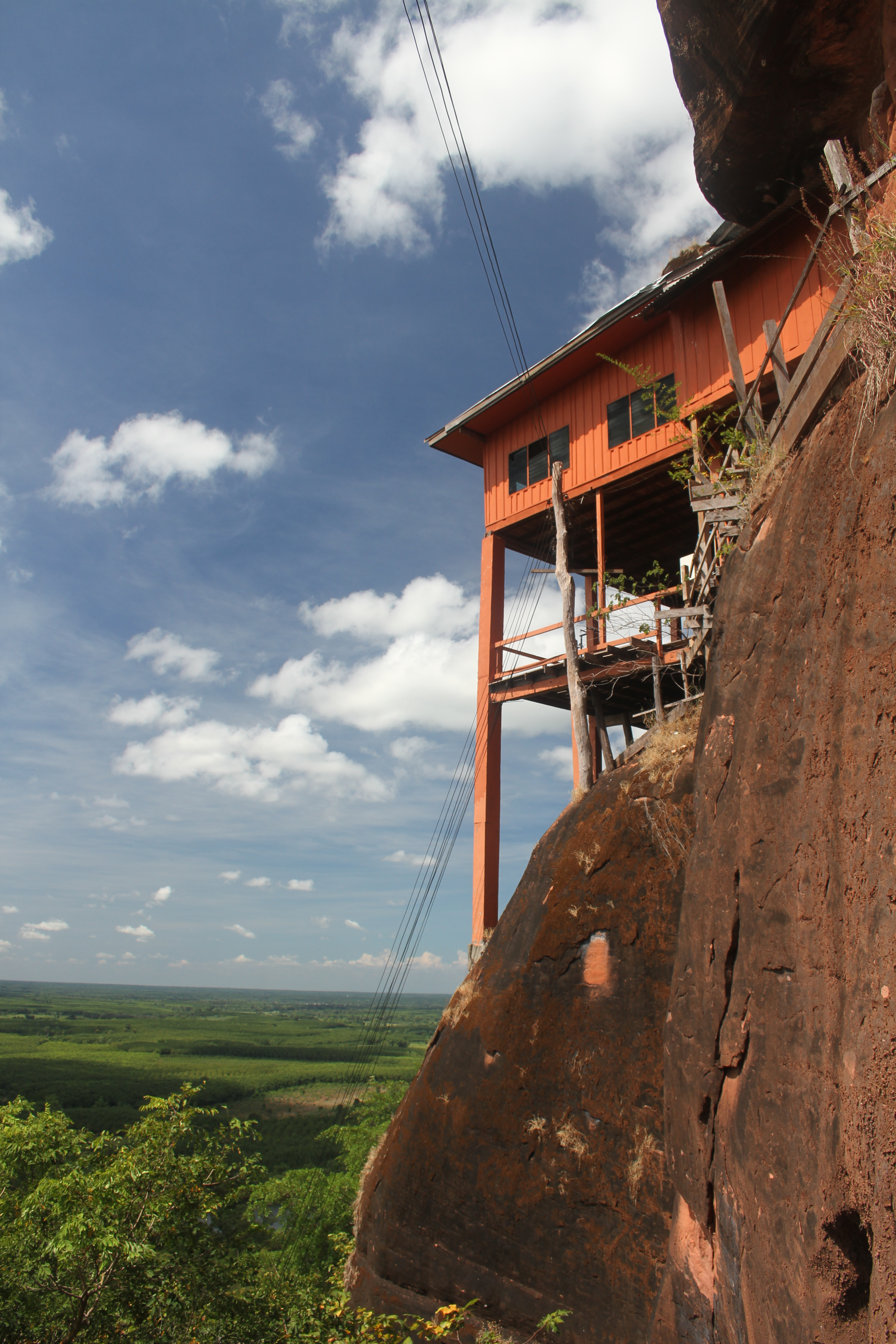
- Cliff side, Phu Thok

- Flag Seal
- Motto: ภูทอกแหล่งพระธรรม ค่าล้ำยางพารา งามตาแก่งอาฮง บึงโขงหลงเพลินใจ น้ำตกใสเจ็ดสี ประเพณีแข่งเรือ เหนือสุดแดนอีสาน นมัสการหลวงพ่อใหญ่ ศูนย์รวมใจศาลสองนาง ("Phu Thok, the source of Dharma. Valuable rubber. Beautiful A Hong Rapids. Fascnating Bueng Khong Long. Clear seven-coloured waterfalls. Boat race traditions. Northernmost of the northeast. Worship Luang Pho Yai. United by Song Nang Shrine.")
- Map of Thailand highlighting Bueng Kan province
- Coordinates: 18°09′22.6″N 103°45′16″E
- Country: Thailand
- Created: 23 March 2011
- Capital: Bueng Kan

Government
  - Type: Province and Provincial Administrative Organization
  - Body: Bueng Kan Province and Bueng Kan Provincial Administrative Organization
  - Governor: Jumpoth Wanchatsiri
  - PAO Chief Executive: Waenfa Thongsri

Area
  - Total: 4,003 km^{2} (1,546 sq mi)
  - Rank: 55th

Population (2024)
  - Total: ▼418,733
  - Rank: 63rd
  - Density: 105/km^{2} (270/sq mi)
  - Rank: 48th

Human Achievement Index
  - HAI (2022): 0.6440 "average" Ranked 34th

GDP
  - Total: baht 27 billion (US$0.8 billion) (2019)
- Time zone: UTC+7 (ICT)
- Postal code: 38xxx
- Calling code: 042
- ISO 3166 code: TH-38
- Website: buengkan.go.th buengkanpao.go.th

Bueng Kan (Thai: บึงกาฬ [bɯ̄ŋ kāːn]), sometimes anglicised as Bung Kan (/bʌŋ ˈkɑːn/ bung KAHN), is the 76th province (changwat) of Thailand, established by the Act Establishing Changwat Bueng Kan, BE 2554 (2011) on 23 March 2011. The province, consisting of the districts (amphoe) partitioned off Nong Khai province, lies in upper northeastern Thailand also called Isan (Thai: อีสาน). It is named after its central district, Mueang Bueng Kan.

== Geography ==
The province is in the northeastern corner of Thailand. It borders, from the south clockwise, Nakhon Phanom, Sakon Nakhon, and Nong Khai province. To the north and east it borders Bolikhamsai province of Laos, with the Mekong River forming the boundary. Hin Sam Wan (which translates into English as Three Whale Rock) is a 75-million-year-old rock formation protruding out of the mountains. It is so named because, from certain angles, the rocks look like a family of whales.

The total forest area is 280 km^{2} (110 sq mi), or 7% of the total provincial area.

=== National park ===
There is one national park, along with six other national parks, making region 10 (Udon Thani) of Thailand's protected areas. (Visitors in fiscal year 2024)

Phu Langka National Park	50 km^{2} (19 sq mi)	(245,262)

=== Wildlife sanctuary ===
There is one wildlife sanctuary in region 10 (Udon Thani) of Thailand's protected areas.

Phu Wua Wildlife Sanctuary	187 km^{2} (72 sq mi)

== History ==
In 1994, Sumet Phromphanhao, a member of the House of Representatives from Nong Khai province, proposed that the province of Bueng Kan be established by consolidating the Bueng Kan, Seka, So Phisai, Bung Khla, Bueng Khong Long, Pak Khat, Phon Charoen, and Si Wilai Districts of Nong Khai province as a new province. The new province, if created, would be 4,305 km^{2}, with a population of about 390,000 inhabitants. At that time, the Ministry of Interior replied that creating a new province would load a heavy burden to the state budget and was contrary to the resolution of the Council of Ministers.

The proposal to create Bueng Kan province was tabled for about 20 years, until 2010 when the Ministry of Interior renewed the project and made a proposal to the Council of Ministers to have a "Bill Establishing Changwat Bueng Kan, BE..." (Thai: ร่างพระราชบัญญัติจัดตั้งจังหวัดบึงกาฬ พ.ศ....) considered. In a poll at the time, 99 percent of the inhabitants of Nong Khai province supported the proposal. On 3 August 2010, the Council of Ministers resolved to present the bill to the National Assembly, citing that the proposal met its criteria for approval.

On 7 February 2011, the National Assembly approved the bill. Prime Minister Abhisit Vejjajiva presented it to King Bhumibol Adulyadej for royal assent. Bhumibol Adulyadej signed the bill on 11 March 2011, enacting it as the "Act Establishing Changwat Bueng Kan, BE 2554 (2011)" (Thai: พระราชบัญญัติตั้งจังหวัดบึงกาฬ พ.ศ. 2554). The act was published in the Government Gazette on 22 March 2011 and came into force the next day.

== Economy ==
Building of the fifth Thai–Lao Friendship Bridge began in 2021. Construction of the bridge is expected to take 3 years for a completion in 2023. The project will link Bueng Kan province with Laos' Bolikhamsai province across the Mekong River. Its cost will be around US$130.3 million. Thailand has agreed to pay US$25.47 million and Laos is covering about US$46.13 million. The bridge will enable Vietnam to be reached by road from Thailand through Laos over a distance of only 150 km. Already existing Thai-Lao Friendship Bridges link Nong Khai province with Vientiane Prefecture (First Thai–Lao Friendship Bridge; Mukdahan with Savannakhet (Second Thai–Lao Friendship Bridge); Nakhon Phanom with Thakhek (Third Thai–Lao Friendship Bridge); and Chiang Rai province with Houayxay (Fourth Thai–Lao Friendship Bridge).

== Symbols ==
The provincial seal of Bueng Kan, Thailand's 76th and newest province, has a depiction of Phu Thok, a mountain in Si Wilai District, an Isan language name which means 'lonely mountain'.

The provincial flower and tree is Bauhinia sirindhorniae K. and S.S. Larsen. An endemic species Neodontobutis aurarmus is the provincial aquatic life.

== Climate ==
Bueng Kan's climate consists of a wet season and a dry season (between December and January). The temperature decreases during November and is at its lowest in December and January. The temperature quickly increases in March, and peaks in April.

== Administrative divisions ==
=== Provincial government ===
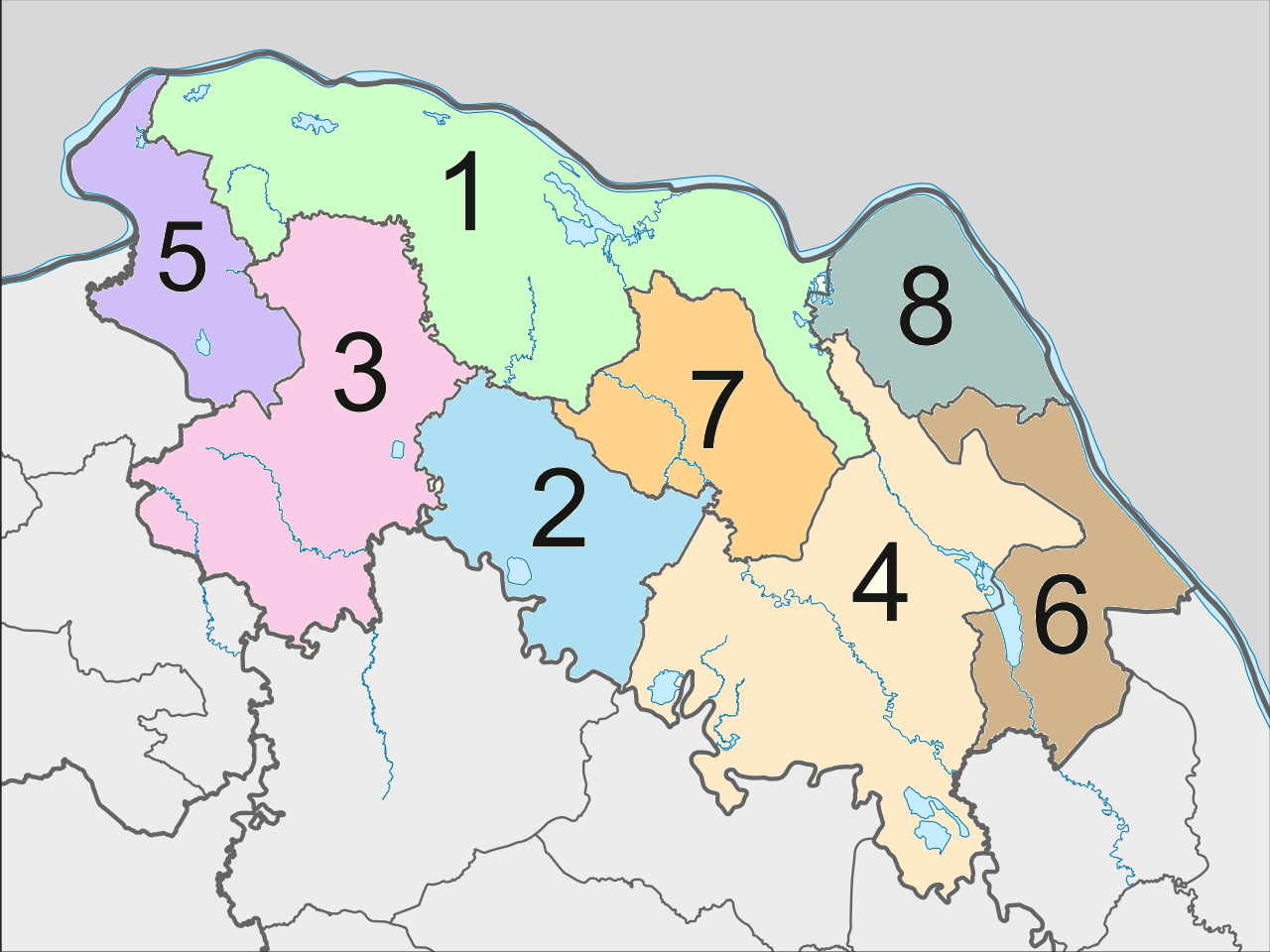
Bueng Kan province with districts

The province is divided into eight districts (amphoe). The districts are further divided into 53 subdistricts (tambon) and 615 villages (muban).

1. Mueang Bueng Kan
2. Phon Charoen
3. So Phisai
4. Seka
5. Pak Khat
6. Bueng Khong Long
7. Si Wilai
8. Bung Khla

=== Local government ===
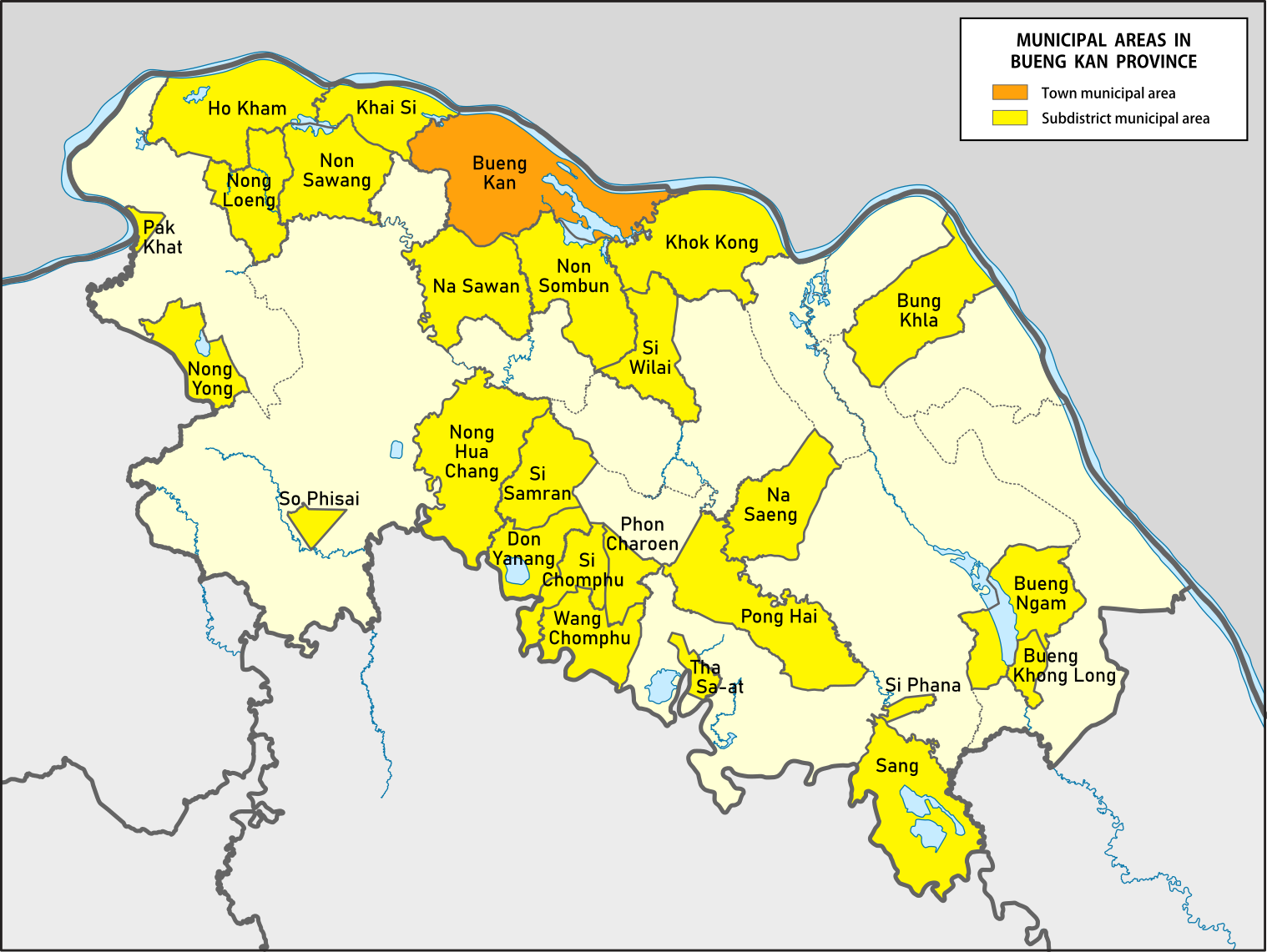
Town municipality (thesaban mueang) Subdistrict municipalities (thesaban tambon)

As of 5 August 2020, there is one Bueng Kan Provincial Administrative Organization, also known as PAO (ongkan borihan suan changwat); there are also eighteen municipal (thesaban) areas in the province. The capital Bueng Kan has town (thesaban mueang) status and seventeen subdistrict municipalities (thesaban tambon).

	Town municipality	Population
1	Bueng Kan	19,612

	Subdistrict mun.	Population	9	Non Sawang	6,920
1	Si Wilai	11,120	10	Tha Sa-at	6,886
2	Pong Hai	10,502	11	Pak Khat	6,854
3	Phon Charoen	10,357	12	So Phisai	6,728
4	Bueng Khong Long	9,811	13	Si Phana	6,678
5	Sang	8,875	14	Bueng Ngam	5,670
6	Nong Loeng	8,725	15	Khai Si	5,478
7	Ho Kham	7,260	16	Don Yanang	5,156
8	Khok Kong	7,063	17	Si Samran	4,970

The non-municipal areas are administered by 39 Subdistrict Administrative
Organizations (SAO) (ongkan borihan suan tambon).

== Human achievement index 2022 ==
Health	Education	Employment	Income
32	53	39	52
Housing	Family	Transport	Participation
7	24	43	54
Province Bueng Kan, with an HAI 2022 value of 0.6440 is "average", occupies place 34 in the ranking.

Since 2003, United Nations Development Programme (UNDP) in Thailand has tracked progress on human development at sub-national level using the human achievement index (HAI), a composite index covering all the eight key areas of human development. National Economic and Social Development Board (NESDB) has taken over this task since 2017.

Rank	Classification
1 - 13	"high"
14 - 29	"somewhat high"
30 - 45	"average"
46 - 61	"somewhat low"
62 - 77	"low"

Map with provinces and HAI 2022 rankings
