= Huai Sam Phat railway station =

Railway station in Huai Sam Phat, Thailand

Huai Sam Phat ห้วยสามพาด

General information
- Location: Huai Sam Phat Subdistrict, Prachaksinlapakhom District; Udon Thani Province; Thailand
- Coordinates: 17°12′33″N 102°56′17″E
- Operator: State Railway of Thailand
- Line: Nong Khai Main Line
- Platforms: 1
- Tracks: 2

Construction
- Structure type: At-grade

Other information
- Station code: หพ.
- Classification: Class 3

Services
Preceding station	State Railway of Thailand	Following station
Kumphawapi towards Hua Lamphong or Krung Thep Aphiwat	Northeastern Line	Nong Takai towards Khamsavath (Laos)
Location

Huai Sam Phat railway station is a railway station located in Huai Sam Phat Subdistrict, Prachaksinlapakhom District, Udon Thani Province. It is a class 3 railway station located 542.75 km (337.2 mi) from Bangkok railway station.
