= Nong Takai railway station =

Railway station in Nong Phai, Thailand

Nong Takai หนองตะไก้

General information
- Location: Nong Phai Subdistrict, Mueang Udon Thani District; Udon Thani Province; Thailand
- Coordinates: 17°16′02″N 102°53′40″E
- Operator: State Railway of Thailand
- Line: Nong Khai Main Line
- Platforms: 1
- Tracks: 5

Construction
- Structure type: At-grade

Other information
- Station code: งต.
- Classification: Class 3

Services
Preceding station	State Railway of Thailand	Following station
Huai Sam Phat towards Hua Lamphong or Krung Thep Aphiwat	Northeastern Line	Kham Kling Halt towards Khamsavath (Laos)
Location

Nong Takai railway station is a railway station located in Nong Phai Subdistrict, Mueang Udon Thani District, Udon Thani Province. It is a class 3 railway station located 550.65 km (342.2 mi) from Bangkok railway station.
