= Kumphawapi railway station =

Railway station in Thailand

Kumphawapi กุมภวาปี

General information
- Location: Phan Don Subdistrict, Kumphawapi District; Udon Thani Province; Thailand
- Coordinates: 17°07′19″N 102°56′53″E
- Operator: State Railway of Thailand
- Manager: Ministry of Thailand
- Line: Nong Khai Main Line
- Platforms: 1
- Tracks: 2

Construction
- Structure type: At-grade

Other information
- Station code: วป.
- Classification: Class 1

Services
| Preceding station | State Railway of Thailand | Following station |
|---|---|---|
| Huai Koeng towards Hua Lamphong or Krung Thep Aphiwat | Northeastern Line | Huai Sam Phat towards Khamsavath (Laos) |
Location

Kumphawapi railway station is a railway station located in Phan Don Subdistrict, Kumphawapi District, Udon Thani Province. It is a class 1 railway station located 532.50 km (330.9 mi) from Bangkok railway station and is the main station for Kumphawapi District.
