= Thung Fon district =

Thung Fon ทุ่งฝน
- District
- District location in Udon Thani province
- Coordinates: 17°28′18″N 103°15′36″E
- Country: Thailand
- Province: Udon Thani
- Seat: Thung Fon

Area
  - Total: 227.903 km^{2} (87.994 sq mi)

Population (2005)
  - Total: 31,029
  - Density: 136.2/km^{2} (353/sq mi)
- Time zone: UTC+7 (ICT)
- Postal code: 41310
- Geocode: 4107

Thung Fon (Thai: ทุ่งฝน, pronounced [tʰûŋ fǒn]; Northeastern Thai: ท่งฝน, pronounced [tʰōŋ fǒn]) is a district (amphoe) in the eastern part of Udon Thani province, northeastern Thailand.

== Geography ==
Neighboring districts are (from the south clockwise) Nong Han, Phibun Rak, Ban Dung of Udon Thani Province, Phon Phisai and Sawang Daen Din of Sakon Nakhon province.

== History ==
The minor district (king amphoe) Thung Fon was created on 1 July 1976, when the tambons Thung Fon and Thung Yai were split off from Nong Han district. It was upgraded to a full district on 21 May 1990.

== Administration ==
The district is divided into four sub-districts (tambons), which are further subdivided into 36 villages (mubans). Thung Fon is a township (thesaban tambon) which covers parts of tambon Thung Fon. There are a further four tambon administrative organizations (TAO).

No.	Name	Thai name	Villages	Pop.
1.	Thung Fon	ทุ่งฝน	12	12,509
2.	Thung Yai	ทุ่งใหญ่	10	9,225
3.	Na Chum Saeng	นาชุมแสง	8	5,989
4.	Na Thom	นาทม	6	3,306
