= Ban Dung district =

Ban Dung บ้านดุง
- District
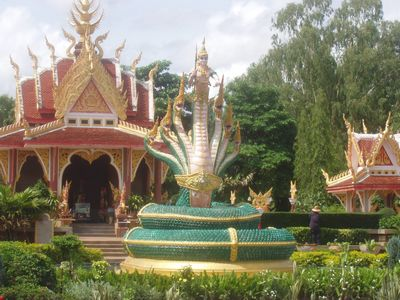
- Shrine in Sri Sut Tho
- Motto: เจ้าปู่ศรีสุทโธรวมศรัทธา ตำนานแดนนาคาคำชะโนด รุ่งโรจน์อุตสาหกรรมเกลือ ถิ่นเชื้อคนดีคุณธรรม สืบสานหัตถกรรมศูนย์ศิลปาชีพ วิทยุข้ามทวีป I.B.B.
- District location in Udon Thani province
- Coordinates: 17°42′4″N 103°15′35″E
- Country: Thailand
- Province: Udon Thani
- Tambon: 13
- Muban: 159
- District established: 1959

Government
  - District head officer: Paitoon Chitsuttipon (นายไพฑูรย์ จิตต์สุทธิผล)

Area
  - Total: 923.768 km^{2} (356.669 sq mi)

Population (2013)
  - Total: 124,812
  - Density: 133.2/km^{2} (345/sq mi)
- Time zone: UTC+7 (ICT)
- Postal code: 41190
- Geocode: 4111

Ban Dung (Thai: บ้านดุง, pronounced [bâːn dūŋ]) is a district (amphoe) in northeastern Udon Thani province, Isan, Thailand.

== Geography ==
Neighbouring districts are (from the south clockwise) Thung Fon, Phibun Rak, Phen, and Sang Khom of Udon Thani province, Phon Phisai and Fao Rai of Nong Khai province, and Ban Muang, Charoen Sin, and Sawang Daen Din of Sakon Nakhon province.

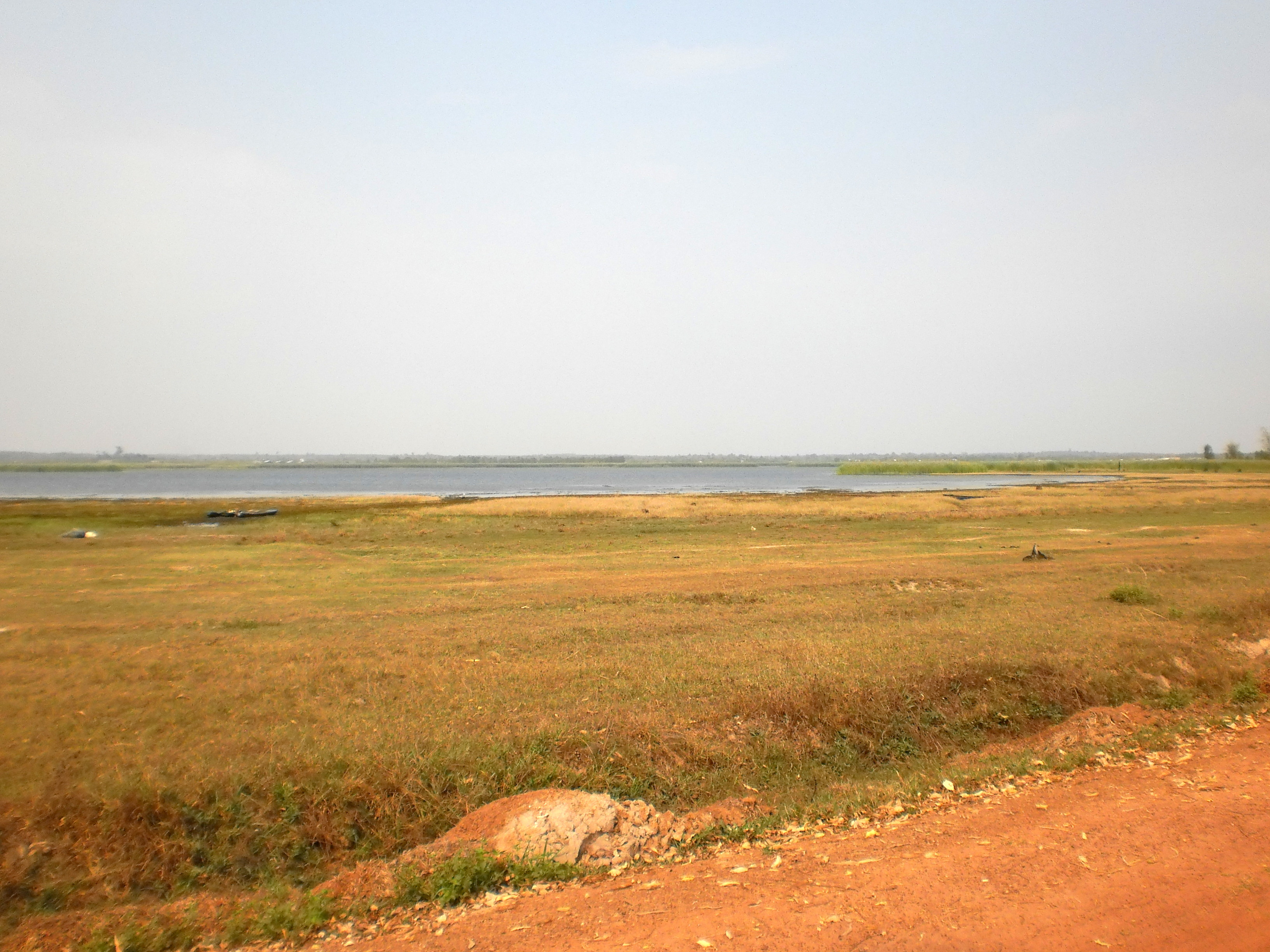
Nong Pla Tao

North of Ban Dung are marshlands and open water called Nong Pla Tao.

The major river is the Songkhram, which marks the boundary of the district to the east.

== History ==
The minor district (king amphoe) Ban Dung was established on 16 May 1959, when three sub-districts were split off from Nong Han district. It was upgraded to a full district on 16 July 1963.

== Administration ==
=== Central administration ===
Ban Dung is divided into 13 sub-districts (tambons), which are further divided into 159 administrative villages (mubans).

No.	Name	Thai	Villages	Pop.
1.	Si Suttho	ศรีสุทโธ	12	14,571
2.	Ban Dung	บ้านดุง	18	13,756
3.	Dong Yen	ดงเย็น	8	6,720
4.	Phon Sung	โพนสูง	17	11,160
5.	Om Ko	อ้อมกอ	10	8,568
6.	Ban Chan	บ้านจันทน์	18	14,277
7.	Ban Chai	บ้านชัย	9	8,615
8.	Na Mai	นาไหม	13	10,232
9.	Thon Na Lap	ถ่อนนาลับ	8	5,272
10.	Wang Thong	วังทอง	9	6,252
11.	Ban Muang	บ้านม่วง	14	8,584
12.	Ban Tat	บ้านตาด	10	6,987
13.	Na Kham	นาคำ	13	9,818

=== Local administration ===
There is one town (thesaban mueang) in the district:

- Ban Dung (Thai: เทศบาลเมืองบ้านดุง) consisting of sub-district Si Suttho and parts of sub-district Ban Dung. The town is divided into 34 communities (chumchon).

There are 12 sub-district administrative organizations (SAO) in the district:

- Ban Dung (Thai: องค์การบริหารส่วนตำบลบ้านดุง) consisting of parts of sub-district Ban Dung.
- Dong Yen (Thai: องค์การบริหารส่วนตำบลดงเย็น) consisting of sub-district Dong Yen.
- Phon Sung (Thai: องค์การบริหารส่วนตำบลโพนสูง) consisting of sub-district Phon Sung.
- Om Ko (Thai: องค์การบริหารส่วนตำบลอ้อมกอ) consisting of sub-district Om Ko.
- Ban Chan (Thai: องค์การบริหารส่วนตำบลบ้านจันทน์) consisting of sub-district Ban Chan.
- Ban Chai (Thai: องค์การบริหารส่วนตำบลบ้านชัย) consisting of sub-district Ban Chai.
- Na Mai (Thai: องค์การบริหารส่วนตำบลนาไหม) consisting of sub-district Na Mai.
- Thon Na Lap (Thai: องค์การบริหารส่วนตำบลถ่อนนาลับ) consisting of sub-district Thon Na Lap.
- Wang Thong (Thai: องค์การบริหารส่วนตำบลวังทอง) consisting of sub-district Wang Thong.
- Ban Muang (Thai: องค์การบริหารส่วนตำบลบ้านม่วง) consisting of sub-district Ban Muang.
- Ban Tat (Thai: องค์การบริหารส่วนตำบลบ้านตาด) consisting of sub-district Ban Tat.
- Na Kham (Thai: องค์การบริหารส่วนตำบลนาคำ) consisting of sub-district Na Kham.

== Economy ==
The district is the site of a Voice of America (VOA) relay station, built in 1994. The Voice of America will give the station to Thailand, but will be allowed to operate it under a 25-year renewable lease expiring in 2019. Each of the station's seven shortwave transmitters is capable of broadcasting 500 kilowatts of power, covering 40 per cent of the Earth's surface. One of the transmitters will be dedicated for use by Radio Thailand. It will have sufficient power to reach the Middle East and the West Coast of the United States, both areas with large expatriate Thai communities.

The VOA installation has been suspected of being a CIA black site used to interrogate alleged terrorists. That suspicion has been supplanted by a BBC report that the Udon Royal Air Force Base was the home of a CIA black site, known to insiders as "Cat's Eye", but better known as "Detention Site Green", used to interrogate Abu Zubaydah, a 31-year-old Saudi-born Palestinian, believed to be one of Osama bin Laden's top lieutenants. In December 2014 the United States Senate Select Committee on Intelligence (SSCI) published an executive summary of a secret 6,000-page report on CIA techniques. The report alleges that at least eight Thai senior officials knew of the secret site. The site was closed in December 2002. Thailand has denied the existence of the site while the US government has neither confirmed or denied its existence.

Ban Dung district is also the largest source of rock salt production in the Isan from the past to the present.

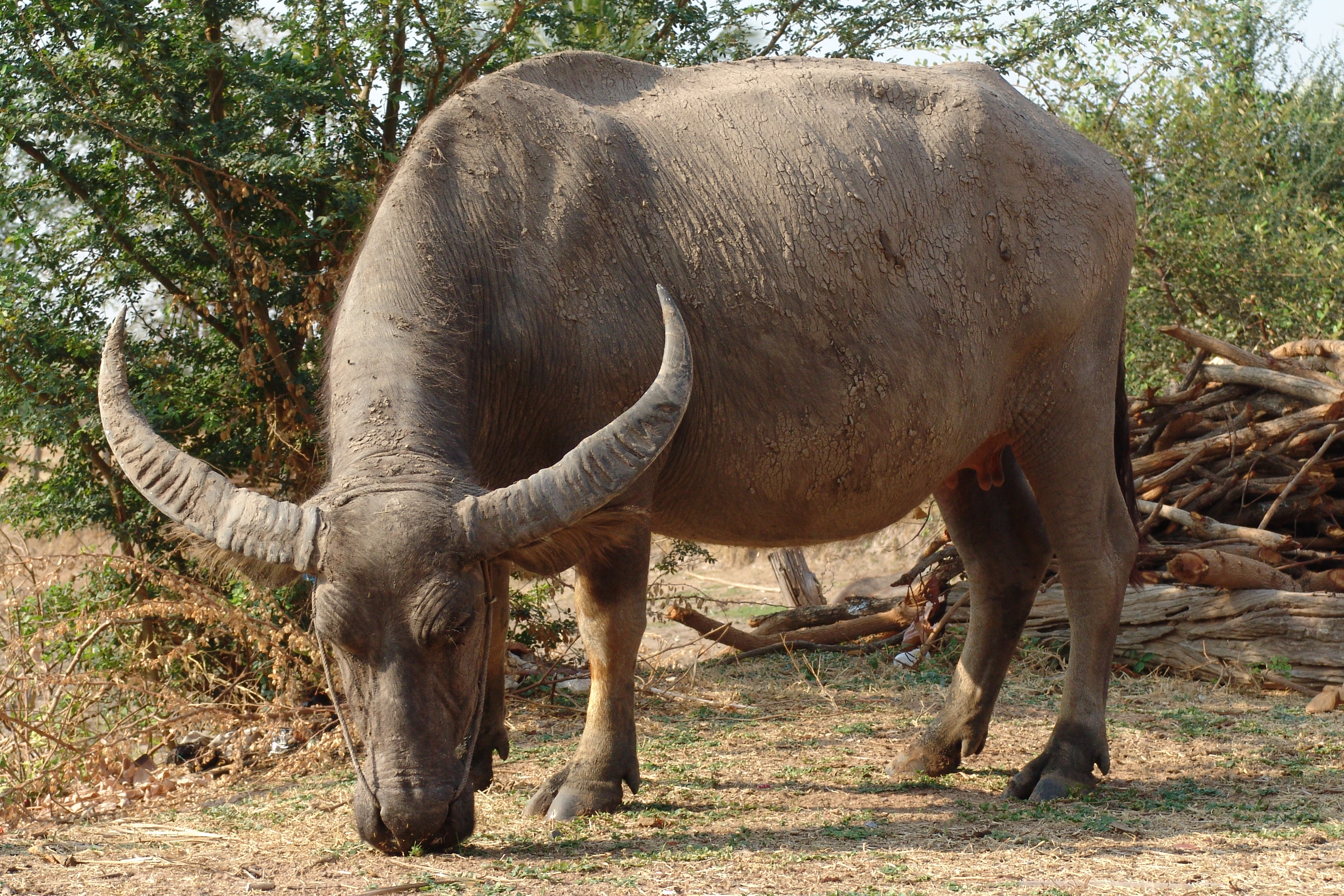
Water Buffalo

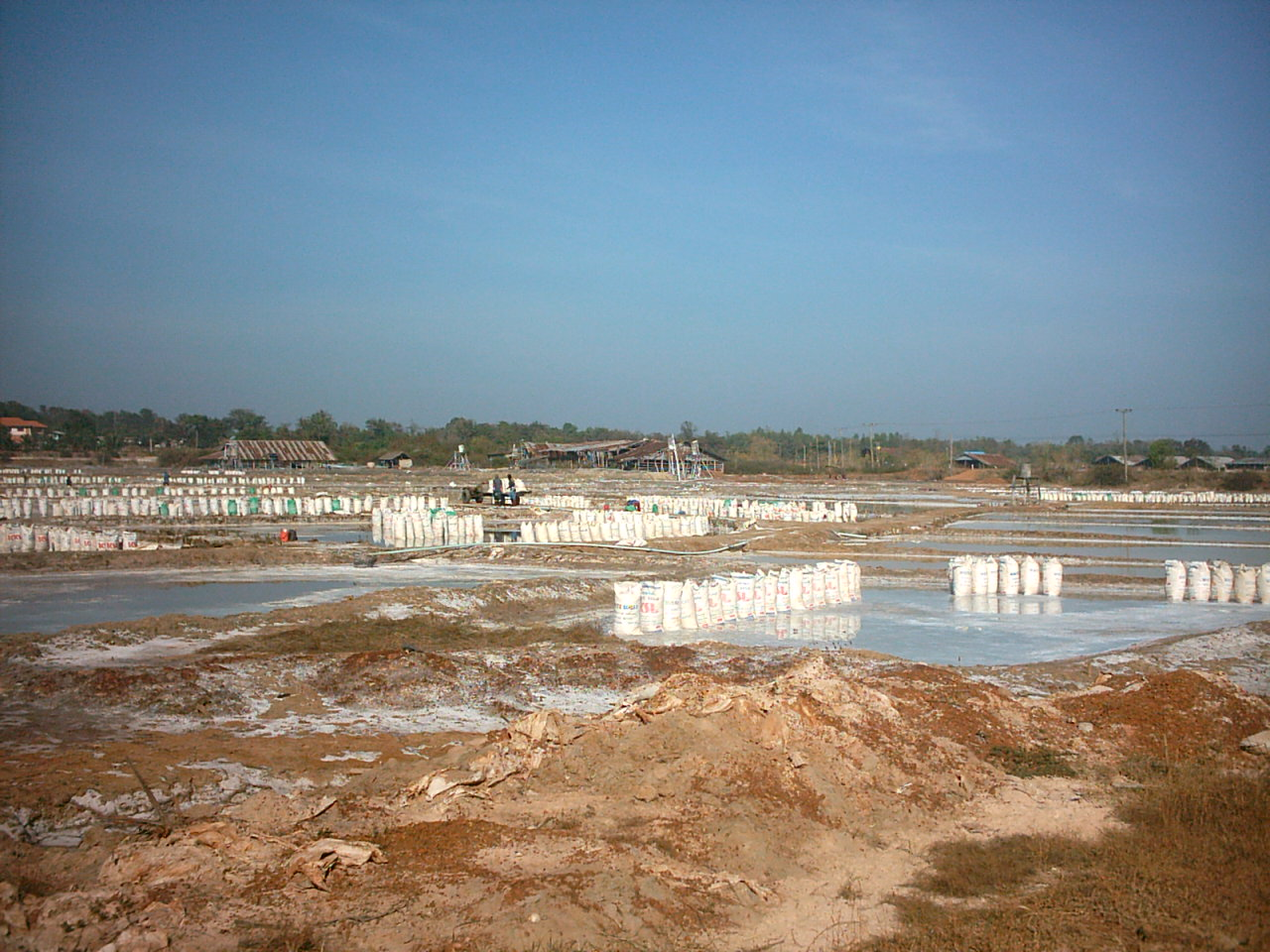
Salt production

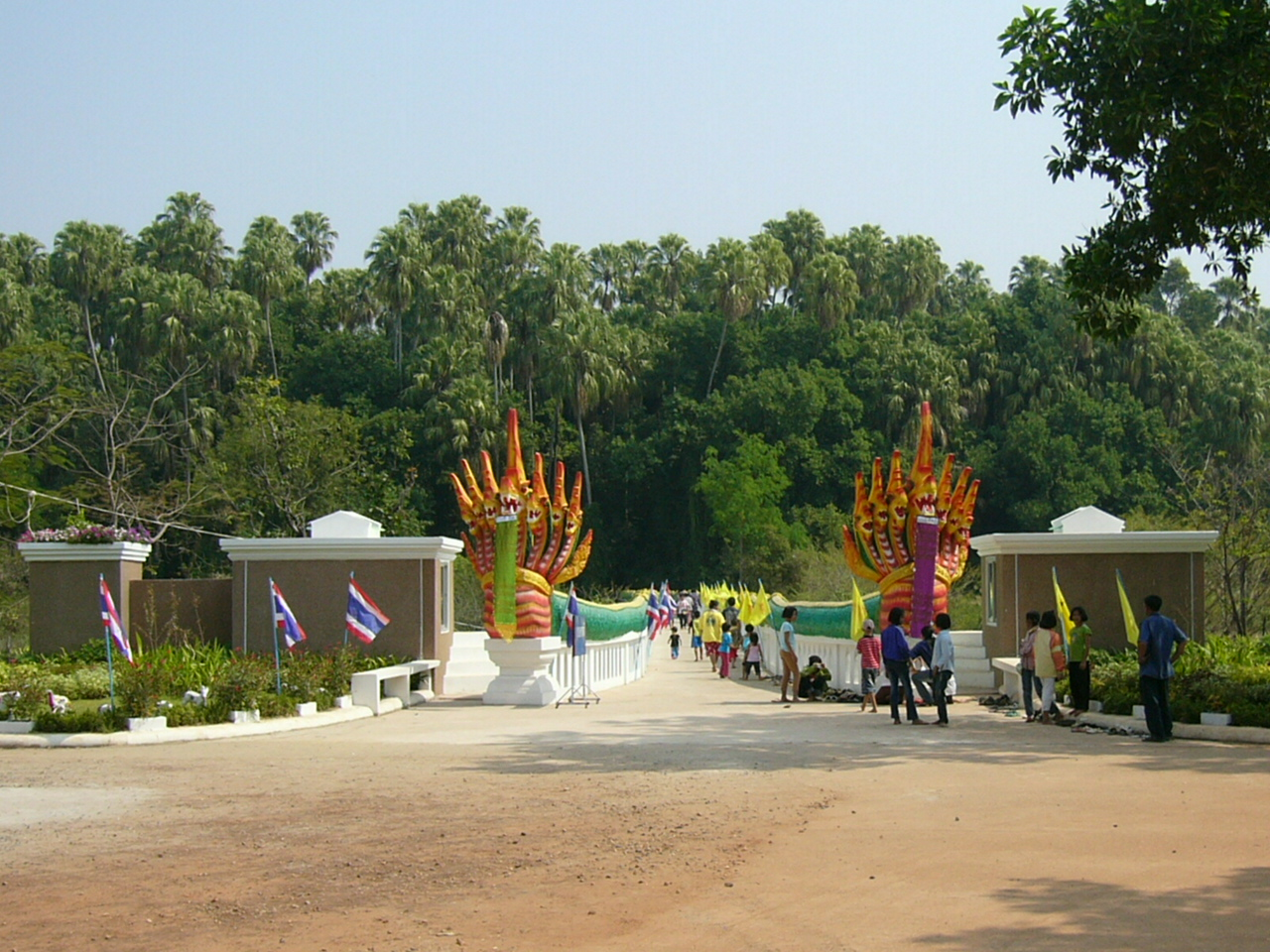
Kham Chanot

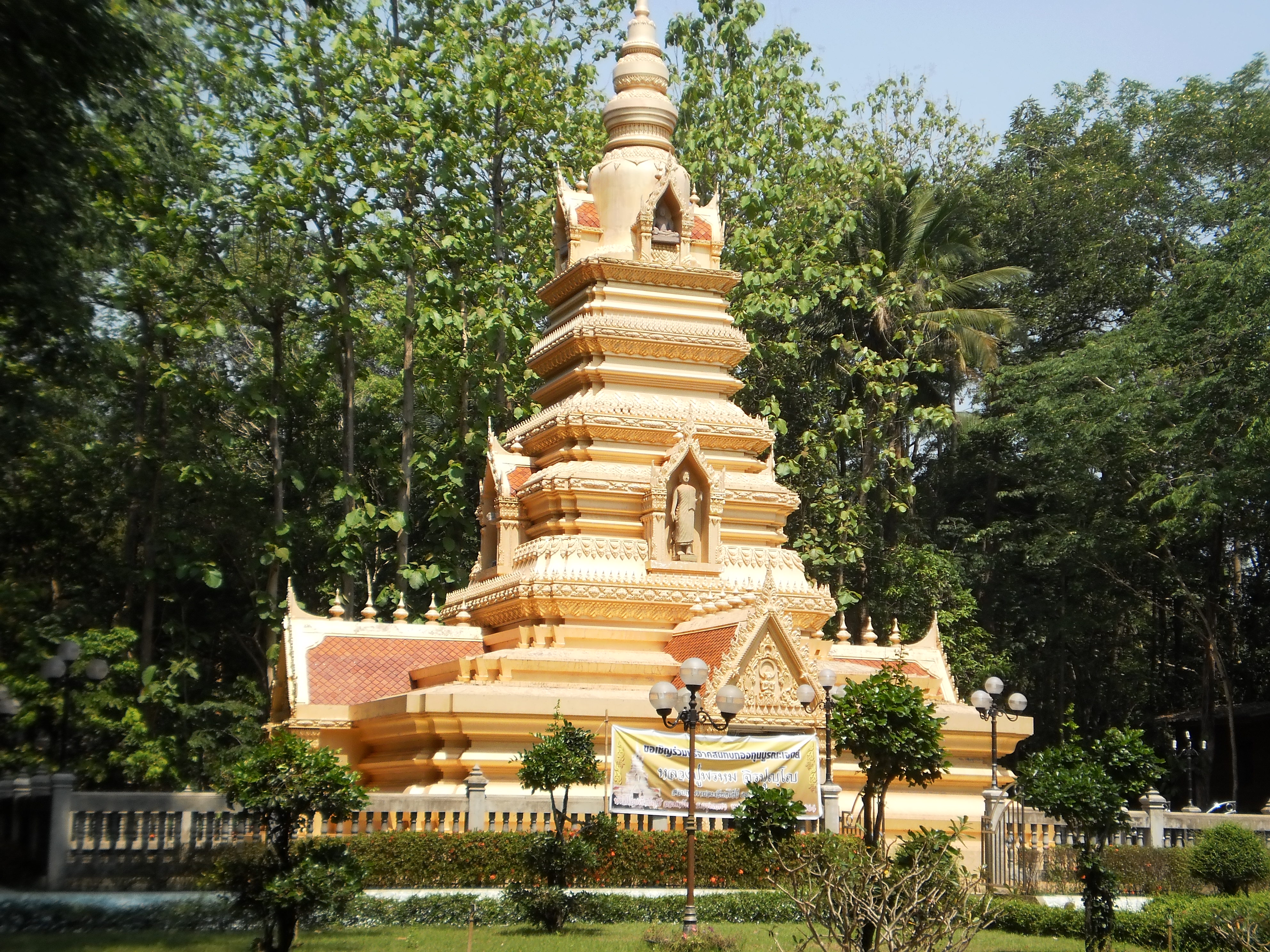
Pagoda at Ban Dong Sawan

== Transport ==
The town is adjacent to the intersection of Highway 2022 and Highway 2096. Local town transport is provided by Isan tuk-tuk style Samlor motor tricycle taxis.

The nearest railway stations are in Nong Khai (83 km) and Udon Thani (81 km) and the nearest full-service airport is Udon Thani International Airport at 88 km.
