= Huai Koeng railway station =

Railway station in Thailand

Huai Koeng ห้วยเกิ้ง

General information
- Location: Huai Koeng Subdistrict, Kumphawapi District; Udon Thani Province; Thailand
- Coordinates: 17°02′32″N 102°55′40″E
- Operator: State Railway of Thailand
- Line: Nong Khai Main Line
- Platforms: 1
- Tracks: 2

Construction
- Structure type: At-grade

Other information
- Station code: ยก.
- Classification: Class 3

Services
Preceding station	State Railway of Thailand	Following station
Non Sa-at towards Hua Lamphong or Krung Thep Aphiwat	Northeastern Line	Kumphawapi towards Khamsavath (Laos)
Location

Huai Koeng railway station is a railway station located in Huai Koeng Subdistrict, Kumphawapi District, Udon Thani Province. It is a class 3 railway station located 523.40 km (325.2 mi) from Bangkok railway station.
