= Tha Khantho district =

Tha Khantho ท่าคันโท
- District
- District location in Kalasin province
- Coordinates: 16°56′24″N 103°14′40″E
- Country: Thailand
- Province: Kalasin

Area
  - Total: 393.6 km^{2} (152.0 sq mi)

Population (2005)
  - Total: 37,293
  - Density: 94.7/km^{2} (245/sq mi)
- Time zone: UTC+7 (ICT)
- Postal code: 46190
- Geocode: 4611

Tha Khantho (Thai: ท่าคันโท, pronounced [tʰâː kʰān.tʰōː]; Northeastern Thai: ท่าคันโท, pronounced [tʰāː kʰân.tʰôː]) is the northwesternmost district (amphoe) of Kalasin province, northeastern Thailand.

== Geography ==
Neighboring districts are (from the south clockwise): Nong Kung Si of Kalasin Province; Kranuan of Khon Kaen province; Kumphawapi, Si That, and Wang Sam Mo of Udon Thani province.

== History ==
The minor district (king amphoe) Tha Khantho was established on 1 October 1962, when the two tambons Tha Khantho and Khok Khruea were split off from Sahatsakhan district. It was upgraded to a full district on 2 October 1965. Khok Khruea was later reassigned to Nong Kung Si District.

== Administration ==
The district is divided into six sub-districts (tambons), which are further subdivided into 59 villages (mubans). Tha Khantho is a township (thesaban tambon) which covers tambon Tha Khantho and parts of Na Tan. There are a further six tambon administrative organizations (TAO).

No.	Name	Thai name	Villages	Pop.
1.	Tha Khantho	ท่าคันโท	9	5,770
2.	Kung Kao	กุงเก่า	11	6,608
3.	Yang Um	ยางอู้ม	6	4,412
4.	Kut Chik	กุดจิก	11	5,457
5.	Na Tan	นาตาล	13	10,433
6.	Dong Sombun	ดงสมบูรณ์	9	4,613
