= Non Sa-at railway station =

Railway station in Thailand

Non Sa-at โนนสะอาด

General information
- Location: Non Sa-at Subdistrict, Non Sa-at District; Udon Thani Province; Thailand
- Coordinates: 16°58′02″N 102°53′50″E
- Operator: State Railway of Thailand
- Line: Nong Khai Main Line
- Platforms: 1
- Tracks: 2

Construction
- Structure type: At-grade

Other information
- Station code: โอ.
- Classification: Class 3

Services
Preceding station	State Railway of Thailand	Following station
Khao Suan Kwang towards Hua Lamphong or Krung Thep Aphiwat	Northeastern Line	Huai Koeng towards Khamsavath (Laos)
Location

Non Sa-at railway station is a railway station located in Non Sa-at Subdistrict, Non Sa-at District, Udon Thani Province. It is a class 3 railway station located 514.45 km (319.7 mi) from Bangkok railway station and is the main station for Non Sa-at District.
