= Phen district =

Phen เพ็ญ
- District
- District location in Udon Thani province
- Coordinates: 17°41′43″N 102°54′26″E
- Country: Thailand
- Province: Udon Thani

Area
  - Total: 908.089 km^{2} (350.615 sq mi)

Population (2005)
  - Total: 110,190
  - Density: 121.3/km^{2} (314/sq mi)
- Time zone: UTC+7 (ICT)
- Postal code: 41150
- Geocode: 4119

Phen (Thai: เพ็ญ, pronounced [pʰēn]) is a district (amphoe) in the northern part of Udon Thani province, Isan, Thailand.

== Geography ==
Neighboring districts are (from the northeast clockwise) Sang Khom, Ban Dung, Phibun Rak, Mueang Udon Thani, Ban Phue of Udon Thani Province, Sakhrai, Mueang Nong Khai and Phon Phisai of Nong Khai province.

== History ==
The district dates back to Mueang Phen, which was a subordinate of Mueang Nong Khai. In 1907 it became a district, then named Mueang Phen (เมืองเพ็ญ) in Udon Thani Province. In 1917 it was renamed Phen.

== Administration ==
The district is divided into 11 sub-districts (tambons), which are further divided into 151 villages (mubans). Phen is a township (thesaban tambon) which covers parts of the tambon Phen. There are a further 11 tambon administrative organizations (TAO).

No.	Name	Thai name	Villages	Pop.
1.	Phen	เพ็ญ	16	12,407
2.	Ban That	บ้านธาตุ	19	16,337
3.	Na Phu	นาพู่	15	12,156
4.	Chiang Wang	เชียงหวาง	15	13,964
5.	Sum Sao	สุมเส้า	19	11,916
6.	Na Bua	นาบัว	11	6,521
7.	Ban Lao	บ้านเหล่า	11	8,379
8.	Chom Si	จอมศรี	17	9,751
9.	Tao Hai	เตาไห	8	5,782
10.	Khok Klang	โคกกลาง	11	7,262
11.	Sang Paen	สร้างแป้น	9	5,715
