= Chom Si, Udon Thani =

Coordinates: 17.833904°N 102.887191°E

Chom Si จอมศรี
- Tambon
- Interactive map of Chom Si
- Country: Thailand
- Province: Udon Thani
- District: Phen

Population (2025)
  - Total: 9,248
- Time zone: UTC+7 (ICT)

Chom Si (Thai: จอมศรี, RTGS: Chom Si, pronounced [t͡ɕɔ̄ːm sǐː]) is a tambon (subdistrict) of Phen district, Udon Thani province, Thailand.

Chom Si is located approximately 60 km (37.3 mi) from Udon Thani city. There is one Subdistrict Health Promoting Hospital in the area, which consists of a total of 17 mubans (villages) with a population of 9,248 people, divided into 2,542 households (data as of July 27, 2025).

Among these, 679 households possess good knowledge of using herbal medicine for basic healthcare, accounting for 26.71 percent, or about one-fourth of the total.

The entire area is under the administration of the Chom Si Subdistrict Administrative Organization.
