= Udonpittayanukoon School =

Udon Pittayanukoon

Location
- 77 Srisuk Road, Mak Khaeng, Mueang, Udon Thani province, 41000; Thailand
- Coordinates: 17.406633°N 102.781157°E

Information
- Type: Public, Secondary school
- Motto: Natti Panya Sama Arpa; No light is brighter than the light of wisdom
- Established: 21 September 1902
- Authority: Office of the Basic Education Commission
- School number: +66-42-221960
- Principal: Sachin Khaokaeo
- Grades: 7–12(Mathayom 1–6)
- Enrollment: 5,098 (2015)
- Colors: blue and pink
- Website: www.udonpit.ac.th

Udon Pittayanukoon (commonly called: Udonpit in Thai: โรงเรียนอุดรพิทยานุกูล) is a public secondary school for grades 7–12. The school is operated under the authority of OBEC (Office of the Basic Education Commission). Udonpit has received recognition as the best school in northeast (Isan) of Thailand and ranked 11th in the country in 2013.

== History ==
Udon Pittayanukoon was originally established as an all-boys school. It was founded by Duke Wattana, the governor of Udon Thani. Because the school was established at the same time as Udon Thani, Udon Pittayanukoon became the major provincial school of Udon Thani.

In 1934, Udon Pittayanukoon was moved from the site that was next to the Machimavat Buddha Temple to its present location on Srisuk Road because the old site was too small for further development.

Udon Pittayanukoon is a leading/prototype school for many national education projects. In 1934, Udon Pittayanukoon became the first school in the Northeast to operate grades 13–14 (in Thai at that time: Mathayom 7 – 8). In 1968, the school adopted “comprehensive teaching”, a development project by OBEC. That project resulted in the largest building expansion in the school. A science building, a library, a business education building, a gymnasium, electrical and mechanical workshops, and a teachers’ residence were the main building improvements which built at that time. In 1978, King Bhumibol and Queen Sirikit gave a blueprint of the dharma building – named, “Luang Pohkaw Anarayo”, which was the first building according to the OBEC policy “bring school and religion closer together ”.
