= Phan Don =

Phan Don พันดอน
- Tambon
- Interactive map of Phan Don
- Coordinates: 17°07′42″N 102°57′42″E
- Country: Thailand
- Province: Udon Thani
- Amphoe: Kumphawapi

Population (2017)
  - Total: 17,410
- Time zone: UTC+7 (TST)
- Postal code: 41370
- TIS 1099: 410402

Phan Don (Thai: พันดอน, pronounced [pʰān dɔ̄ːn]) is a tambon (subdistrict) of Kumphawapi District, in Udon Thani Province, Thailand. In 2017 it had a total population of 17,410 people.

== Administration ==
=== Central administration ===
The tambon is subdivided into 20 administrative villages (muban).

No.	Name	Thai
1.	Ban Phan Don	บ้านพันดอน
2.	Ban Phan Don	บ้านพันดอน
3.	Ban Nong Phueng	บ้านหนองผึ้ง
4.	Ban Wapi	บ้านวาปี
5.	Ban Nam Khong	บ้านน้ำฆ้อง
6.	Ban Phue	บ้านผือ
7.	Ban Phan Don	บ้านพันดอน
8.	Ban Kong Phan	บ้านกงพาน
9.	Ban Na Nong Thum	บ้านนาหนองทุ่ม
10.	Ban Kham Charoen	บ้านคำเจริญ
11.	Ban Dong Khaen	บ้านดงแคน
12.	Ban Don Khaen	บ้านดอนแคน
13.	Ban Kong Phan	บ้านกงพาน
14.	Ban Nong Si Charoen	บ้านหนองศรีเจริญ
15.	Ban Nam Khong	บ้านน้ำฆ้อง
16.	Ban Nam Khong	บ้านน้ำฆ้อง
17.	Ban Mai Kham Charoen	บ้านใหม่คำเจริญ
18.	Ban Nong Udom	บ้านหนองอุดม
19.	Ban Phue	บ้านผือ
20.	Ban Phan Don	บ้านพันดอน

=== Local administration ===
The area of the subdistrict is shared by 2 local governments.

- the subdistrict municipality (Thesaban Tambon) Phan Don (เทศบาลตำบลพันดอน)
- the subdistrict municipality (Thesaban Tambon) Kong Phan Phan Don (เทศบาลตำบลกงพานพันดอน)
