= Fao Rai district =

Fao Rai เฝ้าไร่
- District
- District location in Nong Khai province
- Coordinates: 18°1′8″N 103°18′14″E
- Country: Thailand
- Province: Nong Khai
- Seat: Fao Rai

Area
  - Total: 255.9 km^{2} (98.8 sq mi)

Population (2005)
  - Total: 50,481
  - Density: 197.3/km^{2} (511/sq mi)
- Time zone: UTC+7 (ICT)
- Postal code: 43230
- Geocode: 4315

Fao Rai (Thai: เฝ้าไร่, pronounced [fâw râj]; Northeastern Thai: เฝ้าไฮ่, pronounced [fàw hāj]) is a district (amphoe) of Nong Khai province, northeastern Thailand.

== Geography ==
Neighboring districts are (from the west clockwise): Phon Phisai and Rattanawapi of Nong Khai Province; So Phisai of Bueng Kan province; Ban Muang of Sakon Nakhon province; and Ban Dung of Udon Thani province.

== History ==
The minor district (king amphoe) was split off from Phon Phisai District on 1 April 1995.

On 15 May 2007, all 81 minor districts were upgraded to full districts. With publication in the Royal Gazette on 24 August the upgrade became official.

== Administration ==
The district is divided into five sub-districts (tambons), which are further subdivided into 69 villages (mubans). There are no municipal (thesaban) areas. There are five tambon administrative organizations (TAO).

No.	Name	Thai name	Villages	Pop.
1.	Fao Rai	เฝ้าไร่	17	10,689
2.	Na Di	นาดี	7	3,884
3.	Nong Luang	หนองหลวง	18	15,301
4.	Wang Luang	วังหลวง	14	12,962
5.	Udom Phon	อุดมพร	13	7,645
