= Ban Dung =

Ban Dung บ้านดุง
- Town Municipality
- Location in Thailand
- Coordinates: 17°41′55″N 103°15′40″E
- Country: Thailand
- Province: Udon Thani
- District: Ban Dung

Population (2017)
  - Total: 15,836
- Time zone: UTC+7 (ICT)
- Postcode: 41190
- Area code: 042

Ban Dung (Thai: บ้านดุง) is a town (Thesaban Mueang) in north-eastern Thailand and the local government seat of Ban Dung district (Amphoe) in the province of Udon Thani in the Isan region. As of 2017, it had a total population of 15,836 people.

== Education ==
Numerous primary schools serve the area. High school education is provided by Bandung Wittaya School.

== Transport ==
The town is adjacent to the intersection of Highway 2022 and Highway 2096. Local town transport is provided by Isan tuk-tuk style Samlor motor tricycle taxis. Regional and long distance bus services operate from the bus terminal.

The nearest railway stations are in Nong Khai (83 km) and Udon Thani (81 km) and the nearest full-service airport is Udon Thani International Airport at 88 km.
