= Khao Suan Kwang railway station =

Railway station in Thailand

Khao Suan Kwang เขาสวนกวาง

General information
- Location: Kham Muang Subdistrict, Khao Suan Kwang District; Khon Kaen Province; Thailand
- Coordinates: 16°51′00″N 102°52′35″E
- Operator: State Railway of Thailand
- Line: Nong Khai Main Line
- Platforms: 1
- Tracks: 3

Construction
- Structure type: At-grade

Other information
- Station code: สง.
- Classification: Class 3

Services
Preceding station	State Railway of Thailand	Following station
Huai Sieo towards Hua Lamphong or Krung Thep Aphiwat	Northeastern Line	Non Sa-at towards Khamsavath (Laos)
Location

Khao Suan Kwang railway station is a railway station located in Kham Muang Subdistrict, Khao Suan Kwang District, Khon Kaen Province. It is a class 3 railway station located 500.51 km (311.0 mi) from Bangkok railway station and is the main station for Khao Suan Kwang District.
