= Nam Phong railway station =

Railway station in Thailand

Nam Phong น้ำพอง

General information
- Location: Wang Chai Subdistrict, Nam Phong District; Khon Kaen Province; Thailand
- Coordinates: 16°42′34″N 102°51′40″E
- Operator: State Railway of Thailand
- Line: Nong Khai Main Line
- Platforms: 1
- Tracks: 3

Construction
- Structure type: At-grade

Other information
- Station code: อง.
- Classification: Class 2

Services
Preceding station	State Railway of Thailand	Following station
Ban Wang Chai Halt towards Hua Lamphong or Krung Thep Aphiwat	Northeastern Line	Huai Sieo towards Khamsavath (Laos)
Location

Nam Phong railway station is a railway station located in Wang Chai Subdistrict, Nam Phong District, Khon Kaen Province. It is a class 2 railway station located 484.21 km (300.9 mi) from Bangkok railway station and is the main station for Nam Phong District.
