= Udon Thani Rajabhat University =

Public university in Udon Thani, Thailand

Coordinates: 17°23′51″N 102°47′39″E

- มหาวิทยาลัยราชภัฏอุดรธานี
- Motto: ธมฺมจารี สุขํเสติ (One who observes proper practice lives happily)
- Type: Public
- Established: November 1, 1923
- President: Asst. Prof. Dr. Khanisara Thanyasunthornsakun
- Students: ~22,000
- Location: Udon Thani, Thailand
- Campus: Udon Thani (Main Campus) Bueng Kan Campus Sam Phrao Campus
- Colours: Green and yellow
- Website: www.udru.ac.th

Udon Thani Rajabhat University (UDRU) is a public university located in Udon Thani, in northeastern Thailand. Established on 1 November 1923 as the Monthon Udon Agricultural Teacher Training School, it is one of the universities in the Rajabhat University system. The university confers undergraduate, master's, and doctoral degrees and is officially recognized by the Ministry of Higher Education, Science, Research and Innovation.

== History ==
Udon Thani Rajabhat University has undergone several structural and name changes throughout its history:

- 1923 (1 November): The institution was founded as the Monthon Udon Agricultural Teacher Training School (also referred to as Udon Monthon Agricultural Teacher Training School).
- 1932: Renamed to Udon Thani Provincial Teacher Training School (Udon Thani Teacher Training School).
- 1960: Upgraded in status to Udon Thani Teachers College.
- 1975: Following the passage of the Teachers' College Act, Udon Thani Teachers College was permitted to offer bachelor's degrees.
- 1992–1995: King Bhumibol Adulyadej granted the name "Rajabhat Institute" ("Rajabhat" meaning "people of the king") to teachers' colleges nationwide. Enacted under the Rajabhat Institute Act in 1995, the institution officially became Rajabhat Institute Udon Thani.
- 2004: Following the passage of the Rajabhat University Act in 2003, the institute officially assumed university status on 15 June 2004 as Udon Thani Rajabhat University.

== Campuses ==
The university operates across three campuses in the northeastern region of Thailand:

- Main Campus (Mak Khaeng, Mueang Udon Thani)
- Sam Phrao Campus (Sam Phrao, Mueang Udon Thani)
- Bueng Kan Campus (Bueng Kan province)

== Faculties and colleges ==
Corporate logo of the Faculty of Education

The university is organized into several faculties and colleges offering varied academic disciplines:

- Faculty of Education: the founding faculty of the university and offers undergraduate and graduate programs in education. The dean is Kreetha Promthep.
- Faculty of Humanities and Social Sciences
- Faculty of Science
- Faculty of Management Science
- Faculty of Technology and Engineering
- Faculty of Nursing
- International College
- Graduate School

== See also ==
- Rajabhat University system
