= Udon North mine =

Proposed potash mine in Thailand

Coordinates: 17.297445°N 102.865592°E

Udon North Mine
- Interactive map of Udon North Mine
- Location: Udon Thani Province, Thailand
- Products: Potash

The Udon North Mine is a large potash mine in northern Thailand in Udon Thani Province. The project is approximately 15-20 kilometres southeast of the city of Udon Thani. The project area, including Udon South Mine, covers five sub-districts including Non Sung, Nong Phai, and Nong Khon Kwang of Mueang Udon Thani District together with Huai Sam Phat and Na Muang Sub-districts of Prachaksinlapakhom District. Northeast Thailand is believed to contain the world's third-largest—after Canada and Russia—unexploited potash reserves.

== Operations ==
Mining operations occupy an area of about 26,446 rai or 42.3 km^{2} which consists of the processing plant area of 1,250 rai (2 km^{2}) and an underground mine. The mine is an underground room and pillar mine projected to reach depths of 350–380 metres.

Udon North and South represent one of the largest potash reserves in Thailand, having estimated reserves of 665 million tonnes of ore grading 16 percent potassium chloride extracted from sylvite ore. With a construction budget of more than 30 billion baht, the project is slated to have a maximum capacity of two million tonnes of potash a year.

== Local opposition ==
As of July 2015 mining had not begun at at least some sites due to local opposition. Concerns include questions about the disposal of mine tailings, a waste rock by-product and projected land subsidance. New mining legislation in the form of a minerals act to be enacted 29 October 2017, has increased fears among activists that its intent is to dampen public participation in mining decisions while expediting mining projects.
