= Phu Foi Lom =

Coordinates: 17.1600°N 102.6914°E

Phu Foi Lom (Thai: ภูฝอยลม) is an ecotourism destination in Udon Thani, Thailand. Its plateau is 600 meters above sea level, and it is a part of Pan Don Pa ko National Reserve Park. The name "Phu Foi Lom" is derived from the lichen named "Foi Lom", but they are hard to find because forest trespassers used to invade the area and gather them. Phu Foi Lom is officially established as an eco-tourist attraction especially for natural lovers. In this place, you can find some unique plants and flowers, with beautiful colors and fascinating structure.

The distance between Phu Foi Lom and Udon Thani is not so far, only about 45 kilometers from Udon Thani town. The weather here is good, but it can be very cold in the winter. Make sure to prepare warm clothing to keep your body protected.

== Foi Lom ==
Foi Lom (Scientific name: Psilotum triquetrum Sw.) is a type of lichen which grows well in a high humidity area, and it has green-white color. It is usually found on the tree's branch in the forest. If Foi Lom is found, the air in the forest is very fresh and healthy.
