= Rattanawapi district =

Rattanawapi รัตนวาปี
- District
- District location in Nong Khai province
- Coordinates: 18°13′12″N 103°10′48″E
- Country: Thailand
- Province: Nong Khai
- Seat: Rattanawapi

Area
  - Total: 204.007 km^{2} (78.768 sq mi)

Population (2005)
  - Total: 36,920
  - Density: 181/km^{2} (470/sq mi)
- Time zone: UTC+7 (ICT)
- Postal code: 43120
- Geocode: 4316

Rattanawapi (Thai: รัตนวาปี) is a district (amphoe) of Nong Khai province, northeastern Thailand.

== Geography ==
Rattanawapi is bordered by the following districts: Pak Khat and So Phisai of Bueng Kan province; Fao Rai and Phon Phisai of Nong Khai Province; and Bolikhamxai Province of Laos.

== History ==
The minor district (king amphoe) was split off from Phon Phisai district on 1 April 1995.

On 15 May 2007, all 81 minor districts were upgraded to full districts. On 24 August the upgrade became official.

== Administration ==
The district is divided into five sub-districts (tambons), which are further subdivided into 61 villages (mubans). There are no municipal (thesaban) areas. There are five tambon administrative organizations (TAO).

No.	Name	Thai name	Villages	Pop.
1.	Rattanawapi	รัตนวาปี	12	7,699
2.	Na Thap Hai	นาทับไฮ	10	8,219
3.	Ban Ton	บ้านต้อน	9	3,775
4.	Phra Bat Na Sing	พระบาทนาสิงห์	17	11,044
5.	Phon Phaeng	โพนแพง	13	6,183
