= Phibun Rak district =

Phibun Rak พิบูลย์รักษ์
- District
- District location in Udon Thani province
- Coordinates: 17°32′57″N 103°3′27″E
- Country: Thailand
- Province: Udon Thani
- Seat: Ban Daeng

Area
  - Total: 186.4 km^{2} (72.0 sq mi)

Population (2005)
  - Total: 24,185
  - Density: 129.7/km^{2} (336/sq mi)
- Time zone: UTC+7 (ICT)
- Postal code: 41130
- Geocode: 4123

Phibun Rak (Thai: พิบูลย์รักษ์, pronounced [pʰí.būːn rák]) is a district (amphoe) in central Udon Thani province, northeastern Thailand.

== Geography ==
Neighboring districts are (from the north clockwise) Nong Han, Chai Wan, Si That, Kumphawapi, and Prachaksinlapakhom.

== History ==
The minor district (king amphoe) was established on 1 April 1992 by splitting three tambons from Nong Han district. It was upgraded to a full district on 11 October 1997.

== Administration ==
The district is divided into three sub-districts (tambons), which are further subdivided into 37 villages (mubans). There are no municipal (thesaban) areas, and three tambon administrative organizations (TAO).

No.	Name	Thai name	Villages	Pop.
1.	Ban Daeng	บ้านแดง	15	8,967
2.	Na Sai	นาทราย	11	8,077
3.	Don Kloi	ดอนกลอย	11	7,141
