= Udorn Royal Thai Air Force Base =

Udorn Royal Thai Air Force Base
- Part of Royal Thai Air Force (RTAF)

Site information
- Type: Air force base
- Owner: Royal Thai Air Force
- Operator: Royal Thai Air Force
- Controlled by: Royal Thai Air Force
- Condition: Military Air Force Base

Location
- Coordinates: 17°23′11″N 102°47′18″E

Site history
- Built: 1955
- In use: 1955–present
- Battles/wars: Vietnam War

Airfield information
- IATA: UTH; ICAO: VTUD

Summary
- Elevation AMSL: 579 ft (176 m)
- Coordinates: 17°23′11″N 102°47′18″E

Map
- Location of Udorn Royal Thai Air Force Base

Runways
Direction	Length		Surface
Direction	ft	m	Surface
12/30	10,000	3,048	asphalt

Udorn Royal Thai Air Force Base (Udorn RTAFB) is a Royal Thai Air Force (RTAF) base, the home of 23rd Wing Air Command. It is in the city of Udon Thani in northeastern Thailand and is the main airport serving the city and province.

The RTAF 231 Squadron "Hunter" is assigned to Udorn, equipped with the Dassault/Dornier Alpha Jet-A.

== History ==
=== Establishment ===
Udorn RTAFB was established in the 1950s.

The civil war inside Laos and fears of it spreading into Thailand led the Thai government to allow the United States to use covertly five Thai bases beginning in 1961 for the air defense of Thailand and to fly reconnaissance flights over Laos. Udorn was one of those bases.

Under Thailand's "gentleman's agreement" with the US, RTAF bases used by the US Air Force (USAF) were considered RTAF bases and were commanded by Thai officers. Thai air police controlled access to the bases, along with USAF Security Police, who assisted them in base defense using sentry dogs, observation towers, and machine gun emplacements.

The USAF forces at Udorn were under the command of the United States Pacific Air Forces (PACAF) Thirteenth Air Force. Udorn was the site of TACAN station Channel 31 and was referenced by that identifier in voice communications during air missions

The APO for Udorn was APO San Francisco 96237.

=== Air America ===
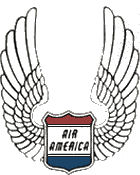

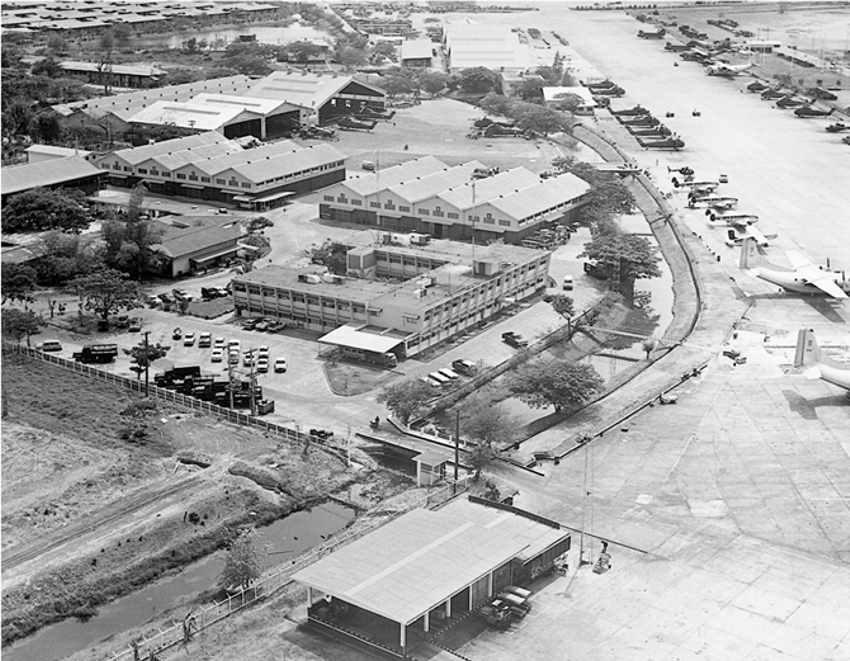
Air America headquarters at Udorn, c. 1967

Udorn RTAFB was the Asian headquarters for Air America (17.3863°N 102.788°E), a US passenger and cargo airline covertly owned and operated by the Central Intelligence Agency (CIA) which provided essential resources for the war in Laos and elsewhere. Its predecessor, Civil Air Transport (CAT), started operations from Udorn on 11 September 1955 with the arrival of three C-46s delivering food and emergency aid into Indochina. By the end of September, CAT had flown more than 200 missions to 25 reception areas, delivering 1,000 tons of emergency food. Conducted smoothly and efficiently, this airdrop relief operation marked the beginning of CAT's and, later, Air America's support of US assistance programs in Laos.

Air America's roles supportive of covert and overt situations related to hostilities in Southeast Asia and elsewhere worldwide provided buffers and solutions to problems the United States faced in various locations. Operations were focused in Laos as part of the "secret war" the United States carried out against the Pathet Lao forces operating in the country. Udorn RTAFB also served as the site of "Headquarters 333", the Thai organization in charge of their forces in Laos.

Air America continued operations from Udorn into Laos until 3 June 1974.

=== US Marine Corps use during the Laotian Crisis ===
In 1961 the 300-man Marine Air Base Squadron Sixteen was deployed to Udorn to maintain helicopters supporting Royal Lao Army forces in Laos.

Following the defeat of Royal Lao Army in the Battle of Luang Namtha in early May 1962 by People's Army of Vietnam and Pathet Lao forces, it appeared that a communist invasion of northern Thailand was imminent and on 15 May the Kennedy Administration ordered US combat forces into Thailand to deter any attack. On 18 May VMA-332 equipped with 20 A-4 Skyhawks deployed to Udorn from Naval Air Station Cubi Point in the Philippines and HMM-261 helicopters flew into the base. On 19 May detachments of Marine Air Control Squadrons 1 and 4 and Marine Air Base Squadron 12 were also flown into the base. On 19 May the command group of the 3rd Marine expeditionary brigade and the Battalion Landing Team 3rd Battalion, 9th Marines began flying in from Bangkok and then moved north to the town of Nong Khai. The Marines conducted field training exercises with the Royal Thai Army and civic action with Thai civilians while Naval Mobile Construction Battalion Ten which arrived in late May established a base camp and repaired public buildings. In late June HMM-162 replaced HMM-261.

On 29 June 1962 with the situation in Laos stabilizing and international negotiations underway, the Kennedy Administration ordered all US combat forces to begin withdrawing from Thailand. On 1 July, VMA-322 departed Udorn for Cubi Point while HMM-162 flew to Bangkok and transports flew out the 3/9 Marines. By 6 July, fewer than 1000 Marines remained at Udorn. The International Agreement on the Neutrality of Laos was signed on 23 July 1962 and the remaining Marines began to withdraw with all combat units withdrawn from Udorn by 31 July.

=== USAF use during the Vietnam War ===
During the Vietnam War the base was a front-line USAF facility from 1964 through 1976.

==== USAF advisory use (1964–1966) ====
The first USAF unit assigned to Udorn was a communications detachment from the 1st Mobile Communications Group, based at Clark Air Base, Philippines, in the summer of 1964. The first permanent USAF unit assigned at Udorn RTAFB was the 333d Air Base Squadron in October 1964. Prior to the formation of the squadron, support personnel were provided by temporary duty personnel from the 35th Tactical Group at Don Muang Royal Thai Air Force Base. The 333d ABS came under the command and control of the 13th Air Force.

On 18 July 1965, the 333rd Air Base Squadron was re-designated the 6232nd Combat Support Group (CSG). This unit also came under the command and control of 13th Air Force and the 6234th Tactical Fighter Wing, a provisional wing at Korat Royal Thai Air Force Base. In July 1965, the 6234th TFW was the only tactical wing in Thailand.

The formation of the 6232d at Udorn was brought about because of expanding USAF programs, an increase in assigned personnel, and increased base support requirements. The majority of personnel at Udorn, prior to the formation of the group, were Temporary duty assignment (TDY). Shortly before the group was activated, a gradual input of permanent party personnel was made to replace those on TDY. On 15 November 1965, the 6232nd CSG was given the responsibility of reporting directly to the Deputy Commander 2nd Air Division, 13th Air Force, rather than directly to the 13th Air Force commander. The 6232nd CSG was re-designated the 630th Combat Support Group on 8 April 1966, with a reporting responsibility to the Deputy Commander, 7th Air Force/13th Air Force (7/13AF), headquartered at Udorn.

Squadrons known to have been deployed to Udorn were the 45th Tactical Reconnaissance Squadron, based at Naha AB, Okinawa with the 39th Air Division(1 November 1965 – 15 August 1966), equipped with RF-101 Voodoos and the 555th Tactical Fighter Squadron, also based at Naha AB (25 February 1966 – 25 July 1966), equipped with the F-4C Phantom II.

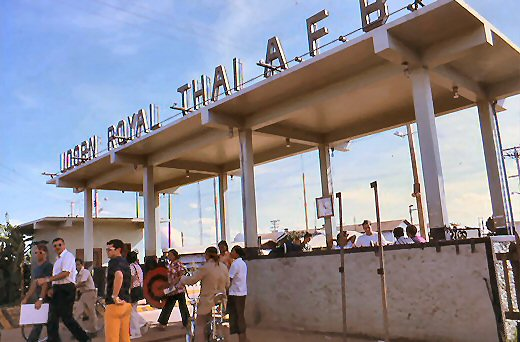
Main Gate, Udorn RTAFB, 1973

==== 432nd Tactical Reconnaissance Wing ====
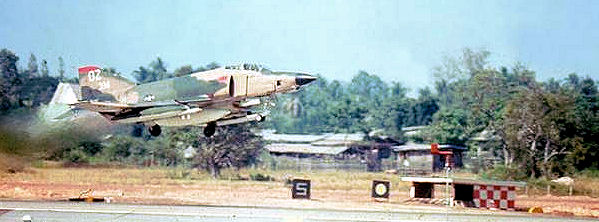
RF-4C of the 14th Tactical Recon Squadron

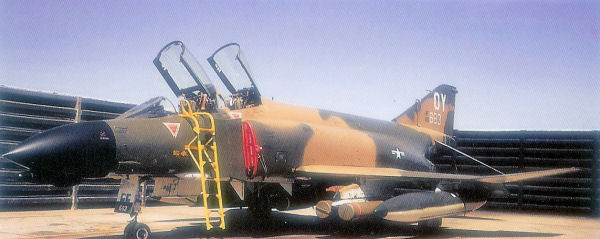
McDonnell F-4D-28-MC Phantom 65-0683 of the 555th Tactical Fighter Squadron, 20 January 1972

On 18 September 1966, the 432nd Tactical Reconnaissance Wing (TRW) was activated and the 630th CSG was placed under the new wing and re-designated the 432nd CSG. It performed combat tactical reconnaissance and added tactical fighter operations in October 1967, initially using fighters to provide combat air patrol and cover for unarmed reconnaissance planes, but later to fly strike missions. Wing fighter units destroyed many enemy aircraft: 36 confirmed aerial victories between 17 December 1967 and 8 January 1973. It also used AC-47D Spooky gunships to provide air defense of friendly Laotian outposts from June 1969 – June 1970. It ceased combat in Vietnam in January, in Laos in February, and in Cambodia in August 1973. The wing remained in Southeast Asia to perform reconnaissance and routine training to retain combat proficiency, changing designations from reconnaissance to fighter in November 1974. The wing supported Operation Eagle Pull, the evacuation of US personnel from Phnom Penh, Cambodia on 12 April 1975, and Operation Frequent Wind, the evacuation of US and South Vietnamese personnel from Saigon on 29 April 1975. From 13 to 15 May 1975, the wing played a major role in locating the SS Mayaguez and in the military operations associated with the recovery of that US commercial vessel and its crew from the Cambodians. The wing was relieved of all operational commitments on 30 November and inactivated at Udorn RTAFB on 23 December 1975.

The 432nd TRW was the most diversified unit of its size in the USAF.

Squadrons of the 432nd TRW were:

==== Tactical reconnaissance squadrons ====
- 20th Tactical Reconnaissance Squadron (18 September 1966 – 1 November 1967) (RF-101C)
  Replaced by: 14th Tactical Reconnaissance Squadron (28 October 1967 – 30 June 1975) (RF-4C)
- 11th Tactical Reconnaissance Squadron (25 October 1966 – 10 November 1970) (RF-4C)

These three squadrons accounted for more than 80% of all reconnaissance activity over North Vietnam.

==== Tactical Fighter Squadrons ====
In addition to reconnaissance the 432d also had a tactical fighter squadron component as follows:

- 435th Tactical Fighter Squadron (5 June - 23 July 1966) (F-104C)
- 13th Tactical Fighter Squadron (21 October 1967 – 30 June 1975) (F-4C/D)
- 555th Tactical Fighter Squadron (28 May 1968 – 5 July 1974) (F-4D)

==== Special Operations Squadrons ====
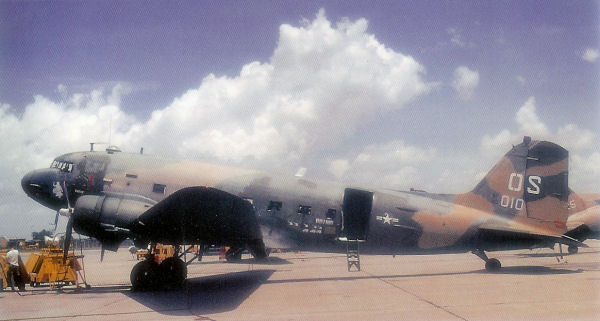
Douglas C/AC-47B-45-DK Skytrain Gunship 45-0010 of the 4th Special Operations Squadron – June 1970

- 7th Airborne Command and Control Squadron (31 October 1968 – 30 April 1972) (C-130)
- 4th Special Operations Squadron (29 October 1972 – 23 December 1975, NOTE: These dates are inconsistent with the 29 December 1970 inactivation listed below in section on Udorn draw down) (3 AC-47D, 4 C-47, 1 AC-119G)

By 1967 or earlier, USAF weather modification flights were originating from a special operations group at Udorn. No more than four C‐130s, and usually only two, were assigned to the restricted section of the base. Their mission was to create rainfall over North Vietnam, Laos, and South Vietnam to hamper enemy logistics and tactical initiative.

Beginning in late 1970, Udorn was drawn down as part of the overall US withdrawal from the Vietnam War:

- On 5 November 1970, the 11th TRS was deployed to Shaw AFB, South Carolina, ending a tour of service with the 432nd TRW.
- On 29 December 1970 the 4th Special Operations Squadron was inactivated, with its aircraft being transferred to the Republic of Vietnam Air Force.
- On 15 April 1972 the 7th Airborne Command and Control Squadron with its C-130s was transferred to Korat RTAFB.

==== 1972 augmentation ====
In 1972, tactical fighter strength was augmented at Udorn by deployed Tactical Air Command continental US-based squadrons in response to the North Vietnamese Easter Offensive. During Operation Linebacker, between May and October 1972, the 432nd TRW had seven F-4 squadrons assigned or attached, making it the largest wing in the USAF. Units deployed to Udorn were:

- 523d Tactical Fighter Squadron (9 April 1972 – 25 October 1972) (F-4D)
- 58th Tactical Fighter Squadron (9 May 1972 – 14 October 1972) (F-4E)
- 308th Tactical Fighter Squadron (9 May 1972 – 29 July 1972) (F-4E)
  Replaced by: 307th Tactical Fighter Squadron (29 July 1972 – 28 October 1972) (F-4E)
- Det 1, 414th Fighter Weapons Squadron (June 1972 – late 1972) (F-4D)
- 421st Tactical Fighter Squadron (31 October 1972 – 23 December 1975) (F-4E)
  (Transferred from 366th TFW, Takhli RTAFB, Thailand)

With the signing of the Paris Peace Accords on 27 January 1973, most of the F-4 squadrons that participated in the 1972 campaigns returned to their home stations and the numbers of USAF personnel and aircraft at Udorn were reduced.

- The 421st TFS transferred to 388th TFW, Hill AFB, Utah on 23 December 1975.
- The 555th Tactical Fighter Squadron was reassigned to the 55th TFW at Luke AFB, Arizona in July 1974.

By 1975, relations between Washington and Bangkok had deteriorated. The Royal Thai Government wanted the USAF out of Thailand by the end of the year. Palace Lightning was the plan under which the USAF would withdraw its aircraft and personnel from Thailand.

- The 13th Tactical Fighter Squadron was inactivated in June 1975.
- The 14th Tactical Reconnaissance Squadron was inactivated in June 1975.

The 423d TRW was inactivated on 23 December 1975 and the last USAF personnel departed Udorn in January 1976. Udorn RTAFB was turned over to Thai authorities. It is now operated by the Royal Thai Air Force with aircraft from the 2nd Air Division being based there.

==== Sapper attacks ====
- 26 July 1968: A team of 25 or more personnel equipped with automatic weapons attacked Udorn RTAFB, causing severe damage to a USAF C-141 and an F-4D, and killing one Thai security guard and the C-141 crew chief
- 3 October 1972: A group of seven guerillas attempted an attack, with three killed and one captured. One Thai security guard was killed.

== Black site ==
The BBC has reported that the base was the location of a CIA black site, known to insiders as "Detention Site Green", used to interrogate Abu Zubaydah, a 31-year-old Saudi-born Palestinian, believed to be one of Osama bin Laden's top lieutenants. In December 2014 the United States Senate Select Committee on Intelligence (SSCI) published an executive summary of a secret 6,000-page report on CIA techniques. The report alleges that at least eight Thai senior officials knew of the secret site. The site was closed in December 2002. Thailand has denied the existence of the site while the US government has neither confirmed or denied its existence.

Earlier reports alleged that a Voice of America relay station in the Ban Dung District of Udon Thani Province was the CIA black site. Another report pointed to Ramasun Station as a possible black site.

== Accidents and incidents ==
- On 10 April 1970 at 14:00 a battle-damaged USAF RF-4C returning from a reconnaissance mission over Laos crash-landed at the base, destroying nine officers' quarters buildings, one officer' quarters trailer and a radio building and killing nine personnel on the ground.

== See also ==
- United States Air Force in Thailand
- United States Pacific Air Forces
- Seventh Air Force
- Thirteenth Air Force
- Black site

== Bibliography ==
- Endicott, Judy G. (1999) Active Air Force wings as of 1 October 1995; USAF active flying, space, and missile squadrons as of 1 October 1995. Maxwell AFB, Alabama: Office of Air Force History. CD-ROM.
- Glasser, Jeffrey D. (1998). The Secret Vietnam War: The United States Air Force in Thailand, 1961–1975. McFarland & Company. ISBN 0-7864-0084-6.
- Martin, Patrick (1994). Tail Code: The Complete History of USAF Tactical Aircraft Tail Code Markings. Schiffer Military Aviation History. ISBN 0-88740-513-4.
- USAAS-USAAC-USAAF-USAF Aircraft Serial Numbers—1908 to present
- The Royal Thai Air Force (English Pages)
- Royal Thai Air Force – Overview
- Udorn Royal Thai Air Force Base
