= Sang Khom district =

Sang Khom สร้างคอม
- District
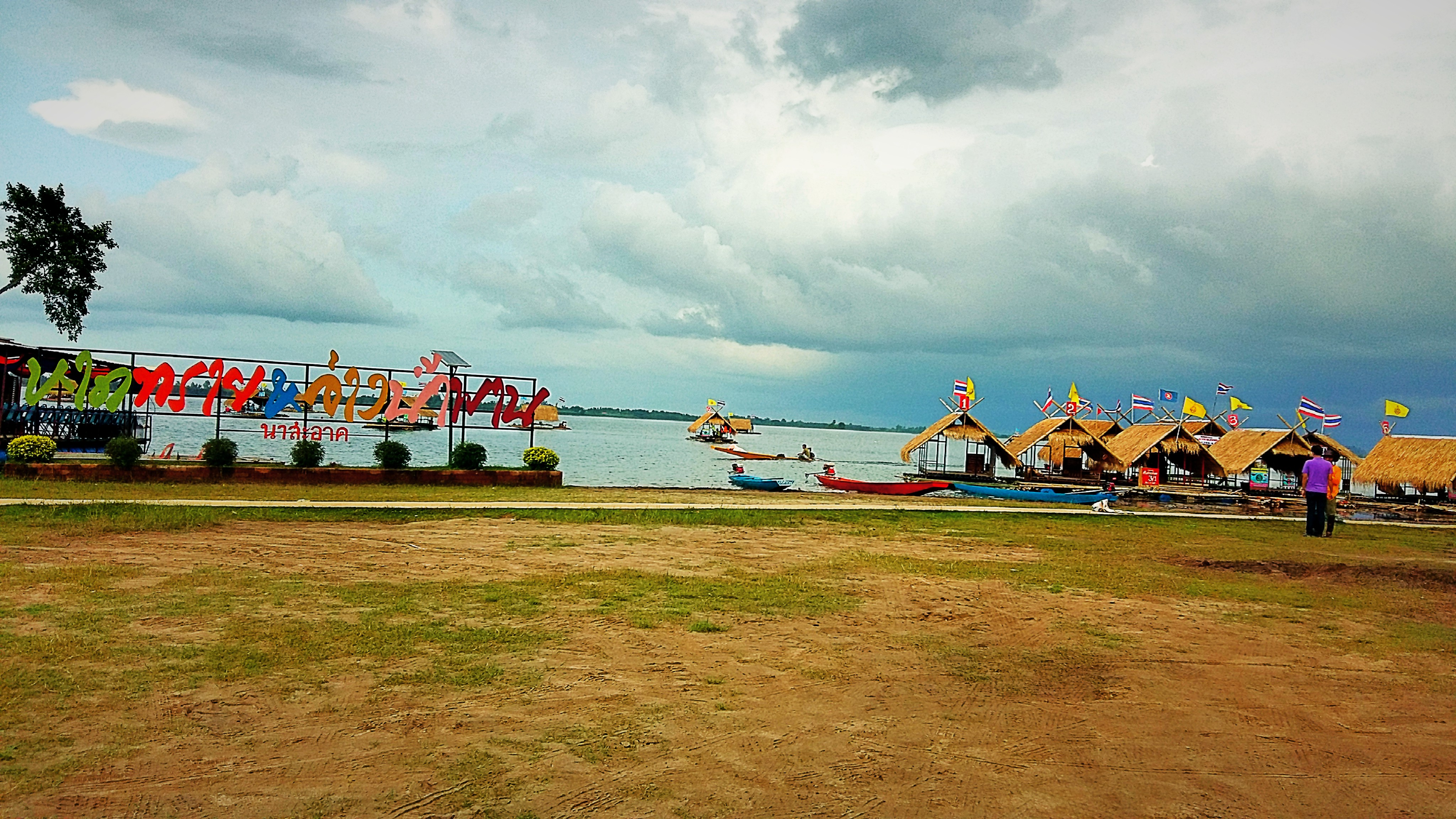
- Phan Reservoir

- District location in Udon Thani province
- Coordinates: 17°49′32″N 103°5′19″E
- Country: Thailand
- Province: Udon Thani
- Seat: Sang Khom

Area
  - Total: 287.179 km^{2} (110.880 sq mi)

Population (2005)
  - Total: 28,441
  - Density: 99/km^{2} (260/sq mi)
- Time zone: UTC+7 (ICT)
- Postal code: 41260
- Geocode: 4120

Sang Khom (Thai: สร้างคอม, pronounced [sâːŋ kʰɔ̄m]) is a district (amphoe) in northern Udon Thani province, northeastern Thailand.

== Etymology ==
The district's original name was "Ban Sang Khom" (Thai: บ้านส่างคอม), only slightly different from the modern variation. The word sang (Thai: ส้าง) or (Thai: สร้าง) is (Thai: ส่าง) in the Lao-Isan dialect and means 'pond' or 'minor body of water', while khom (Thai: คอม) is a species of tree native to the area. A story is told that when the village was first established, around the year 1898, there was some digging going on in a local pond and after some time, khom trees grew around the pond's shore. Therefore, the villagers called the place "Sang Khom."

== Geography ==
Neighboring districts are (clockwise from the southeast) Ban Dung and Phen of Udon Thani Province and Phon Phisai of Nong Khai province.

Sang Khom district is home to Nam Pan Lake, a sizable body of freshwater in the northern part of the district.

== History ==
The minor district (king amphoe) was established on 15 May 1975, when three tambons, Sang Khom, Ban Yuat, and Chiang Da, split from Phen district. On 21 May 1990 it was upgraded to a full district.

== Administration ==
The district is divided into six sub-districts (tambons), which are further subdivided into 52 villages (mubans). There are no municipal (thesaban) areas, and six tambon administrative organizations (TAO).

No.	Name	Thai name	Villages	Pop.
1.	Sang Khom	สร้างคอม	13	7,512
2.	Chiang Da	เชียงดา	8	3,397
3.	Ban Yuat	บ้านยวด	6	4,090
4.	Ban Khok	บ้านโคก	10	7,263
5.	Na Sa-at	นาสะอาด	8	2,247
6.	Ban Hin Ngom	บ้านหินโงม	7	3,932
