= Huai Sieo railway station =

Railway station in Thailand

Huai Sieo ห้วยเสียว

General information
- Location: Nam Phong Subdistrict, Nam Phong District; Khon Kaen Province; Thailand
- Coordinates: 16°45′25″N 102°52′15″E
- Operator: State Railway of Thailand
- Line: Nong Khai Main Line
- Platforms: 1
- Tracks: 2

Construction
- Structure type: At-grade

Other information
- Station code: ยว.
- Classification: Class 3

Services
| Preceding station | State Railway of Thailand | Following station |
|---|---|---|
| Nam Phong towards Hua Lamphong or Krung Thep Aphiwat | Northeastern Line | Khao Suan Kwang towards Khamsavath (Laos) |
Location

Huai Sieo railway station is a railway station located in Nam Phong Subdistrict, Nam Phong District, Khon Kaen Province. It is a class 3 railway station located 489.95 km (304.4 mi) from Bangkok railway station.
