= Phon Phisai district =

Phon Phisai โพนพิสัย
- District
- District location in Nong Khai province
- Coordinates: 18°1′19″N 103°4′38″E
- Country: Thailand
- Province: Nong Khai

Area
  - Total: 642.7 km^{2} (248.1 sq mi)

Population (2008)
  - Total: 96,580
  - Density: 149.1/km^{2} (386/sq mi)
- Time zone: UTC+7 (ICT)
- Postal code: 43120
- Geocode: 4305

Phon Phisai (Thai: โพนพิสัย, pronounced [pʰōːn pʰíʔ.sǎj]; Northeastern Thai: โพนพิสัย, pronounced [pʰôːn pʰìʔ.sǎj]) is a district (amphoe) in Nong Khai province, northeastern Thailand.

== History ==
The district was originally part of Mueang Phon Phaeng, now part of Rattanawapi district. In 1906 it was established as a district.

== Geography ==
Neighboring districts are (from the east clockwise) Rattanawapi and Fao Rai of Nong Khai Province; Ban Dung, Sang Khom, and Phen of Udon Thani province; and Mueang Nong Khai of Nong Khai. To the north across the Mekong River are the Laotian Vientiane Prefecture and Bolikhamxai province.

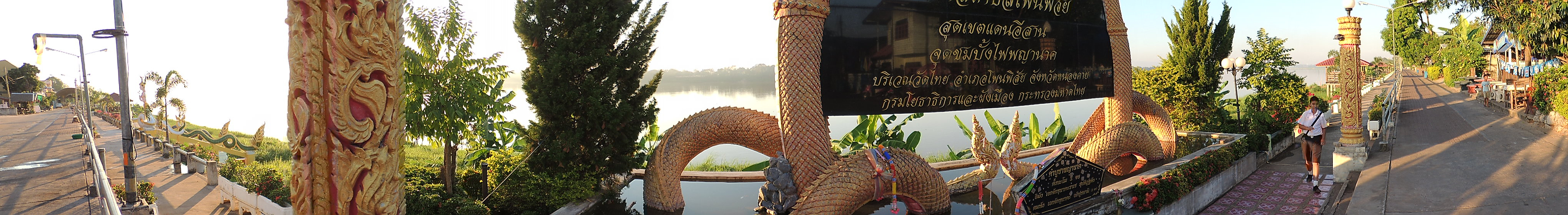
The Mekong River at Phon Phisai

== Administration ==
The district is divided into 11 sub-districts (tambons), which are further subdivided into 151 villages (mubans). Chumphon is a sub-district municipality (thesaban tambon) which covers parts of tambon Chumphon. There are a further 11 tambon administrative organizations (TAO).

No.	Name	Thai	Villages	Pop.
1.	Chumphon	จุมพล	24	19,738
2.	Wat Luang	วัดหลวง	16	9,200
3.	Kut Bong	กุดบง	14	8,681
4.	Chum Chang	ชุมช้าง	19	9,498
6.	Thung Luang	ทุ่งหลวง	12	5,172
7.	Lao Tang Kham	เหล่าต่างคำ	13	6,376
8.	Na Nang	นาหนัง	16	11,129
9.	Soem	เซิม	10	7,426
13.	Ban Pho	บ้านโพธิ์	12	10,281
21.	Ban Phue	บ้านผือ	7	5,440
22.	Sang Nang Khao	สร้างนางขาว	8	3,639

Missing numbers are tambon which now form the districts Fao Rai and Rattanawapi.
