= Wang Sam Mo district =

Wang Sam Mo วังสามหมอ
- District
- District location in Udon Thani province
- Coordinates: 16°56′59″N 103°25′43″E
- Country: Thailand
- Province: Udon Thani
- Seat: Phasuk

Area
  - Total: 727.3 km^{2} (280.8 sq mi)

Population (2005)
  - Total: 55,730
  - Density: 76.6/km^{2} (198/sq mi)
- Time zone: UTC+7 (ICT)
- Postal code: 41280
- Geocode: 4110

Wang Sam Mo (Thai: วังสามหมอ, pronounced [wāŋ sǎːm mɔ̌ː]; Northeastern Thai: วังสามหมอ, pronounced [wâŋ sǎːm mɔ̌ː]) is a district (amphoe) in southeastern Udon Thani province, northeastern Thailand.

== Geography ==
Neighboring districts are (from the west clockwise) Si That and Chai Wan of Udon Thani Province, Waritchaphum, Nikhom Nam Un, and Kut Bak of Sakon Nakhon province and Kham Muang, Sam Chai, and Nong Kung Si and Tha Khantho of Kalasin province.

== History ==
The minor district (king amphoe) Wang Sam Mo was established on 1 October 1975, when the three tambons Nong Kung Thap Ma, Ba Yao, and Nong Ya Sai were split off from Si That district. It was upgraded to a full district on 13 July 1981.

== Administration ==
The district is divided into six sub-districts (tambons), which are further subdivided into 72 villages (mubans). Wang Sam Mo is a sub-district municipality (thesaban tambon) which covers parts of tambon Wang Sam Mo. Phasuk is a sub-district municipality which covers the whole same-named tambon. There are a further five tambon administrative organizations (TAO).

No.	Name	Thai	Villages	Pop.
1.	Nong Kung Thap Ma	หนองกุงทับม้า	11	7,922
2.	Nong Ya Sai	หนองหญ้าไซ	9	7,649
3.	Ba Yao	บะยาว	12	9,441
4.	Phasuk	ผาสุก	18	15,421
5.	Kham Khok Sung	คำโคกสูง	9	5,615
6.	Wang Sam Mo	วังสามหมอ	13	11,683
