= Ku Kaeo district =

Ku Kaeo กู่แก้ว
- District
- District location in Udon Thani province
- Coordinates: 17°10′20″N 103°9′11″E
- Country: Thailand
- Province: Udon Thani
- Seat: Ban Chit

Area
  - Total: 181.2 km^{2} (70.0 sq mi)

Population (2005)
  - Total: 21,962
  - Density: 121.2/km^{2} (314/sq mi)
- Time zone: UTC+7 (ICT)
- Postal code: 41130
- Geocode: 4124

Ku Kaeo (Thai: กู่แก้ว, pronounced [kùː kɛ̂ːw]; Northeastern Thai: กู่แก้ว, pronounced [kúː kɛ̂ːw]) is a district (amphoe) in central Udon Thani province, northeastern Thailand.

== Geography ==
Neighboring districts are (from the north clockwise): Nong Han, Chai Wan, Si That, Kumphawapi, and Prachaksinlapakhom.

== History ==
The minor district (king amphoe) was established on 30 April 1994 by splitting it from Nong Han district.

On 15 May 2007 all 81 Thai minor districts were upgraded to full districts. On 24 August the upgrade became official.

== Administration ==
The district is divided into four sub-districts (tambons), which are further subdivided into 37 villages (mubans). There are no municipal (thesaban) areas, and four tambon administrative organizations (TAO).

No.	Name	Thai name	Villages	Pop.
1.	Ban Chit	บ้านจีต	8	5,581
2.	Non Thong In	โนนทองอินทร์	8	4,489
3.	Kho Yai	ค้อใหญ่	6	3,634
4.	Khon Sai	คอนสาย	15	8,258
