= Chai Wan district =

Chai Wan ไชยวาน
- District
- District location in Udon Thani province
- Coordinates: 17°17′12″N 103°13′24″E
- Country: Thailand
- Province: Udon Thani
- Seat: Chai Wan

Area
  - Total: 326.155 km^{2} (125.929 sq mi)

Population (2007)
  - Total: 38,209
  - Density: 117.2/km^{2} (304/sq mi)
- Time zone: UTC+7 (ICT)
- Postal code: 41290
- Geocode: 4108

Chai Wan (Thai: ไชยวาน, pronounced [t͡ɕʰāj wāːn]) is a district (amphoe) in the southeastern part of Udon Thani province, northeastern Thailand.

== History ==
Chai Wan district was a part of Nong Han district. It was created as a minor district (king amphoe) on 3 January 1977, when the two sub-districts Chai Wan and Nong Lak were detached from Nong Han District. In 1979 the third sub-district, Kham Lo, was created and the fourth sub-district Phon Sung transferred from Nong Han. The minor district was upgraded to a full district on 1 February 1988.

== Geography ==
Neighboring districts are (from the south clockwise) Wang Sam Mo, Si That, Ku Kaeo, Nong Han of Udon Thani Province, Sawang Daen Din and Song Dao of Sakon Nakhon province.

== Administration ==
The district is divided into four sub-districts (tambons), which are further subdivided into 51 villages (mubans). Chai Wan is a sub-district municipality (thesaban tambon) which covers parts of tambon Chai Wan. There are four tambon administrative organizations (TAO).

No.	Name	Thai	Villages	Pop.
1.	Chai Wan	ไชยวาน	17	13,121
2.	Nong Lak	หนองหลัก	12	10,011
3.	Kham Lo	คำเลาะ	11	7,980
4.	Phon Sung	โพนสูง	11	7,097
