= Nong Han district =

Nong Han หนองหาน
- District
- District location in Udon Thani province
- Coordinates: 17°21′38″N 103°6′20″E
- Country: Thailand
- Province: Udon Thani
- Seat: Nong Han

Area
  - Total: 708.119 km^{2} (273.406 sq mi)

Population (2005)
  - Total: 114,982
  - Density: 162.4/km^{2} (421/sq mi)
- Time zone: UTC+7 (ICT)
- Postal code: 41130
- Geocode: 4106

Nong Han (Thai: หนองหาน, pronounced [nɔ̌ːŋ hǎːn]) is a district (amphoe) of Udon Thani province, northeastern Thailand.

== Geography ==
Neighboring districts are (from the south clockwise) Chai Wan, Ku Kaeo, Prachaksinlapakhom, Mueang Udon Thani, Phibun Rak and Thung Fon of Udon Thani province, and Sawang Daen Din of Sakon Nakhon province.

== History ==
The Ban Chiang (Thai: มู่ที่ 13 ตำบล บ้านเชียง, romanized: Hamlet 13 Tambon Ban Chiang) archaeological site has been a world heritage site since 1992. It was settled from the Neolithic to the Iron Age, and then abandoned from about 300 CE until the early-19th century. It is best known for its red painted pottery.

Mueang Nong Han was one of the four original subdivisions of Udon Thani, which were converted into amphoe during the monthon Thesaphiban administrative reforms in 1908.

== Economy ==
Tambon Phak Top is to be the site of Thailand's largest biomass-fired power plant if plans by its owner, the Thai Appliance Industry PLC (Thaico) come to fruition. The 20 megawatt plant is facing significant local opposition. The plant would require the construction of six waste sorting plants not too distant to provide feedstock to the power plant.

== Administration ==
The district is divided into 12 sub-districts (tambons), which are further divided into 161 villages (mubans). There are three sub-district municipalities (thesaban tambon): Nong Han, Nong Mek, and Ban Chiang. Each cover parts of tambons of the same name. There are a further 12 tambon administrative organizations (TAO).

No.	Name	Thai	Villages	Pop.
1.	Nong Han	หนองหาน	17	16,902
2.	Nong Mek	หนองเม็ก	19	14,915
5.	Phang Ngu	พังงู	15	9,540
6.	Sabaeng	สะแบง	8	8,015
7.	Soi Phrao	สร้อยพร้าว	11	5,921
9.	Ban Chiang	บ้านเชียง	15	11,198
10.	Ban Ya	บ้านยา	11	5,419
11.	Phon Ngam	โพนงาม	20	13,381
12.	Phak Top	ผักตบ	13	8,297
14.	Nong Phai	หนองไผ่	14	9,172
17.	Don Hai Sok	ดอนหายโศก	10	6,496
18.	Nong Sa Pla	หนองสระปลา	8	6,037

Missing numbers are tambon which now form the districts Phibun Rak and Ku Kaeo.
