= Si That district =

Si That ศรีธาตุ
- District
- District location in Udon Thani province
- Coordinates: 16°58′22″N 103°13′0″E
- Country: Thailand
- Province: Udon Thani
- Seat: Si That

Area
  - Total: 512.5 km^{2} (197.9 sq mi)

Population (2005)
  - Total: 47,888
  - Density: 93.4/km^{2} (242/sq mi)
- Time zone: UTC+7 (ICT)
- Postal code: 41230
- Geocode: 4109

Si That (Thai: ศรีธาตุ, pronounced [sǐː tʰâːt]) is a district (amphoe) in the southeastern Udon Thani province, northeastern Thailand.

== Geography ==
Neighboring districts are (from the west clockwise) Kumphawapi, Ku Kaeo, Chai Wan and Wang Sam Mo of Udon Thani Province, and Tha Khantho of Kalasin province.

== History ==
The minor district (king amphoe) Si That was created on 1 March 1968 by splitting off the five tambons Champi, Na Yung, Nong Ya Sai, Ban Prong, and Nong Kung Thap Ma from Kumphawapi district. It was upgraded to a full district on 28 June 1973.

== Administration ==
The district is divided into seven sub-districts (tambons), which are further subdivided into 81 villages (mubans). Si That is a township (thesaban tambon) which covers parts of tambon Si That. There are a further seven tambon administrative organizations (TAO).

| No. | Name | Thai name | Villages | Pop. |
|---|---|---|---|---|
| 1. | Si That | ศรีธาตุ | 11 | 8,193 |
| 2. | Champi | จำปี | 17 | 7,977 |
| 3. | Ban Prong | บ้านโปร่ง | 11 | 5,549 |
| 4. | Hua Na Kham | หัวนาคำ | 14 | 10,602 |
| 5. | Nong Nok Khian | หนองนกเขียน | 7 | 4,445 |
| 6. | Na Yung | นายูง | 10 | 5,069 |
| 7. | Tat Thong | ตาดทอง | 11 | 6,053 |
