= Mueang Udon Thani district =

Mueang Udon Thani เมืองอุดรธานี
- District
- District location in Udon Thani province
- Coordinates: 17°24′54″N 102°47′12″E
- Country: Thailand
- Province: Udon Thani
- Seat: Mak Khaeng

Area
  - Total: 1,094.7 km^{2} (422.7 sq mi)

Population (2013)
  - Total: 404,767
  - Density: 370/km^{2} (960/sq mi)
- Time zone: UTC+7 (ICT)
- Postal code: 41000
- Geocode: 4101

Mueang Udon Thani (Thai: เมืองอุดรธานี, pronounced [mɯ̄aŋ ʔù.dɔ̄ːn tʰāː.nīː]; Northeastern Thai: เมืองอุดรธานี, pronounced [mɯ̂aŋ ʔǔ.dɔ̀ːn tʰâː.nîː]) is the capital district (amphoe mueang) of Udon Thani province, northeastern Thailand.

== Geography ==
Neighboring districts are (from the north clockwise): Phen, Phibun Rak, Nong Han, Prachaksinlapakhom, Kumphawapi, Nong Saeng, Nong Wua So, Kut Chap, and Ban Phue of Udon Thani Province.

== History ==
Originally named Ban Mak Khaeng (บ้านหมากแข้ง), the district was one of the original four districts of Udon Thani established during the thesaphiban administrative reforms in 1908. In 1938 its name was changed from Mak Khaeng to Mueang Udon Thani.

=== Ramasun Station ===
Ramasun Station, formerly Chang ('elephant') Station, officially the 7th Radio Research Field Station (RRFS), in Non Sung Subdistrict, was constructed by the US in 1964, just as the Vietnam War was gaining momentum. The site was run by the United States Army Security Agency (ASA), the Army's signals intelligence branch closely allied with the National Security Agency. Its purpose was radio communications intercept and triangulation of enemy installations. The site was dominated by a large, circular Wullenweber array. In its heyday, the station housed 1,200 to 1,500 US personnel, complete with sleeping quarters, a cinema, a post exchange (PX), gym, swimming pool, tennis court, arms depot, and a 300 meter long tunnel that the Thai army today claims was used for electronic cable storage. It employed more than 1,400 Thais at generous wages. With the US pullout of Southeast Asia in 1975, the station was handed over to the Thai 3rd Infantry Division. In 1983, it became the base of the 1st Battalion, 13th Infantry Regiment. In August 1997, it was renamed "Sunthondhammathada Camp". The station reemerged in news of the US war on terror as some believe it to be the location of a US CIA "black site" used to interrogate suspected terrorists by the United States.

== Administration ==
The district is divided into 21 sub-districts (tambons), which are further subdivided into 248 villages (mubans). The city (thesaban nakhon) Udon Thani covers tambon Mak Khaeng and parts of Nong Bua and Nong Khon Kwang. There are two town municipalities (thesaban mueang). Nong Samrong covers tambon Na Di and parts of Mu Mon, Ban Lueam, and Non Sung. Nam Kham covers parts of tambon Non Sung. There are five sub-district municipalities (thesaban tambon). Nikhom Songkhro covers parts of tambon Nikhom Songkhro and Khok Sa-at; Nong Bua parts of tambon Nong Bua, Nong Na Kham, Sam Phrao, and Nong Khon Kwang; Ban Chan parts of tambon Ban Chan and Nong Khon Kwang; Na Kha parts of tambon Na Kha. There are 18 tambon administrative organizations (TAO).

No.	Name	Thai	Villages	Pop.
1.	Mak Khaeng	หมากแข้ง	-	141,209
2.	Nikhom Songkhro	นิคมสงเคราะห์	12	12,692
3.	Ban Khao	บ้านขาว	10	9,957
4.	Nong Bua	หนองบัว	7	17,060
5.	Ban Tat	บ้านตาด	14	12,224
6.	Non Sung	โนนสูง	14	19,549
7.	Mu Mon	หมูม่น	12	15,384
8.	Chiang Yuen	เชียงยืน	16	15,580
9.	Nong Na Kham	หนองนาคำ	18	21,893
10.	Kut Sa	กุดสระ	11	8,414
11.	Na Di	นาดี	8	6,738
12.	Ban Lueam	บ้านเลื่อม	8	16,530
13.	Chiang Phin	เชียงพิณ	8	10,945
14.	Sam Phrao	สามพร้าว	10	17,844
15.	Nong Hai	หนองไฮ	13	12,279
16.	Na Kha	นาข่า	15	12,498
17.	Ban Chan	บ้านจั่น	16	13,144
18.	Nong Khon Kwang	หนองขอนกว้าง	12	10,517
19.	Khok Sa-at	โคกสะอาด	10	7,260
20.	Na Kwang	นากว้าง	10	6,874
21.	Nong Phai	หนองไผ่	12	8,458

== Economy ==
Non Sung, Nong Phai, and Nong Khon Kwang Sub-districts of Mueang Udon Thani District will become sites of the Udon North potash mine if the project is approved.
