= Prachaksinlapakhom district =

Prachaksinlapakhom ประจักษ์ศิลปาคม
- District
- District location in Udon Thani province
- Coordinates: 17°16′22″N 102°59′39″E
- Country: Thailand
- Province: Udon Thani
- Seat: Na Muang
- Tambon: 3
- Muban: 41
- District established: 1997

Area
  - Total: 144.8 km^{2} (55.9 sq mi)

Population (2015)
  - Total: 25,332
  - Density: 215.1/km^{2} (557/sq mi)
- Time zone: UTC+7 (ICT)
- Postal code: 41110
- Geocode: 4125

Prachaksinlapakhom (Thai: ประจักษ์ศิลปาคม) is a district (amphoe) in central Udon Thani province, northeastern Thailand.

== Geography ==
Neighboring districts are (from the north clockwise) Nong Han, Ku Kaeo, Kumphawapi, and Mueang Udon Thani.

== History ==
The minor district (king amphoe) was established on 1 June 1997 by splitting it from Kumphawapi district. The creation became effective on 1 July 1997.

On 15 May 2007, all 81 minor districts were upgraded to full districts. With publication in the Royal Gazette on 24 August, the upgrade became official.

== Administration ==
=== Central administration ===
Prachaksinlapakhom is divided into three sub-districts (tambons), which are further subdivided into 41 administrative villages (mubans).

No.	Name	Thai	Villages	Pop.
1.	Na Muang	นาม่วง	14	10,448
2.	Huai Sam Phat	ห้วยสามพาด	13	7,000
3.	Um Chan	อุ่มจาน	14	7,884

=== Local administration ===
There are three sub-district administrative organizations (SAO) in the district:

- Na Muang (Thai: องค์การบริหารส่วนตำบลนาม่วง) consisting of sub-district Na Muang.
- Huai Sam Phat (Thai: องค์การบริหารส่วนตำบลห้วยสามพาด) consisting of sub-district Huai Sam Phat.
- Um Chan (Thai: องค์การบริหารส่วนตำบลอุ่มจาน) consisting of sub-district Um Chan.

== Economy ==
Huai Sam Phat and Na Muang Sub-districts are among five Udon Thani sub-districts to harbour mining operations of the Udon North potash mine, although the mine has met with local resistance.
