= Kumphawapi district =

Kumphawapi กุมภวาปี
- District
- District location in Udon Thani province
- Coordinates: 17°6′50″N 103°1′7″E
- Country: Thailand
- Province: Udon Thani
- Seat: Kumphawapi

Area
  - Total: 672.6 km^{2} (259.7 sq mi)

Population (2017)
  - Total: 124,241
  - Density: 187.6/km^{2} (486/sq mi)
- Time zone: UTC+7 (ICT)
- Postal code: 41110
- Geocode: 4104

Kumphawapi (Thai: กุมภวาปี, pronounced [kūm.pʰā.wāː.pīː]; Northeastern Thai: กุมภวาปี, pronounced [kùm.pʰā.wâː.pìː]) is a district (amphoe) in the southern part of Udon Thani province, northeastern Thailand.

== Etymology ==
Kumpha กุมภ[า] is from Sanskrit 'pitcher' or 'water-pot', as reflected in the name of February, associated with the zodiac sign of Aquarius. Wapi วาปี is from Sanskrit 'pond', synonymous with หนองนํ้า, บึง.

== Geography ==
Neighboring districts are (from the southwest clockwise): Non Sa-at, Nong Saeng, Mueang Udon Thani, Prachaksinlapakhom, Ku Kaeo and Si That of Udon Thani Province; Tha Khantho of Kalasin province and Kranuan of Khon Kaen province.

North of the central town is the shallow Nong Han Kumphawapi Lake. The lake is surrounded by marshland, one of the largest natural wetlands in northeast Thailand. The lake is drained by Lam Pao.

== History ==
Mueang Kumphawapi was one of the four original subdivisions of Udon Thani, which were converted into amphoes during the thesaphiban administrative reforms in 1908.

== Symbols ==
The district slogan is "Kumphawapi, city of sugar, monkey park, highland of glass Buddha station, goose wetland stream of life."

== Administration ==
=== Central administration ===
Kumphawapi is divided into 13 sub-districts (tambons), which are further subdivided into 176 administrative villages (mubans).

No.	Name	Thai	Villages	Pop.
1.	Tum Tai	ตูมใต้	9	7,042
2.	Phan Don	พันดอน	20	17,410
3.	Wiang Kham	เวียงคำ	18	10,496
4.	Chaelae	แชแล	14	10,311
6.	Chiang Wae	เชียงแหว	13	8,633
7.	Huai Koeng	ห้วยเกิ้ง	8	5,424
9.	Soephloe	เสอเพลอ	19	11,959
10.	Si O	สีออ	8	4,546
11.	Pakho	ปะโค	17	11,304
13.	Pha Suk	ผาสุก	10	6,379
14.	Tha Li	ท่าลี่	14	9,775
15.	Kumphawapi	กุมภวาปี	15	12,890
16.	Nong Wa	หนองหว้า	11	8,072

Missing numbers are tambon which now form Prachak Sinlapakhom District.

=== Local administration ===
There are nine sub-district municipalities (thesaban tambons) in the district:

- Kumphawapi (Thai: เทศบาลตำบลกุมภวาปี) consisting of parts of sub-district Kumphawapi.
- Phan Don (Thai: เทศบาลตำบลพันดอน) consisting of parts of sub-district Phan Don.
- Huai Koeng (Thai: เทศบาลตำบลห้วยเกิ้ง) consisting of sub-district Huai Koeng.
- Pa Kho (Thai: เทศบาลตำบลปะโค) consisting of sub-district Pakho.
- Wiang Kham (Thai: เทศบาลตำบลเวียงคำ) consisting of sub-district Wiang Kham.
- Nong Wa (Thai: เทศบาลตำบลหนองหว้า) consisting of sub-district Nong Wa.
- Kong Phan Phan Don (Thai: เทศบาลตำบลกงพานพันดอน) consisting of parts of sub-district Phan Don.
- Chaelae (Thai: เทศบาลตำบลแชแล) consisting of sub-district Chaelae.
- Chiang Wae (Thai: เทศบาลตำบลเชียงแหว) consisting of sub-district Chiang Wae.

There are six subdistrict administrative organizations (SAO) in the district:

- Tum Tai (Thai: องค์การบริหารส่วนตำบลตูมใต้) consisting of sub-district Tum Tai.
- Soephloe (Thai: องค์การบริหารส่วนตำบลเสอเพลอ) consisting of sub-district Soephloe.
- Si O (Thai: องค์การบริหารส่วนตำบลสีออ) consisting of sub-district Si O.
- Pha Suk (Thai: องค์การบริหารส่วนตำบลผาสุก) consisting of sub-district Pha Suk.
- Tha Li (Thai: องค์การบริหารส่วนตำบลท่าลี่) consisting of sub-district Tha Li.
- Kumphawapi (Thai: องค์การบริหารส่วนตำบลกุมภวาปี) consisting of parts of sub-district Kumphawapi.
