= Udon Thani province =

Udon Thani อุดรธานี
- Province
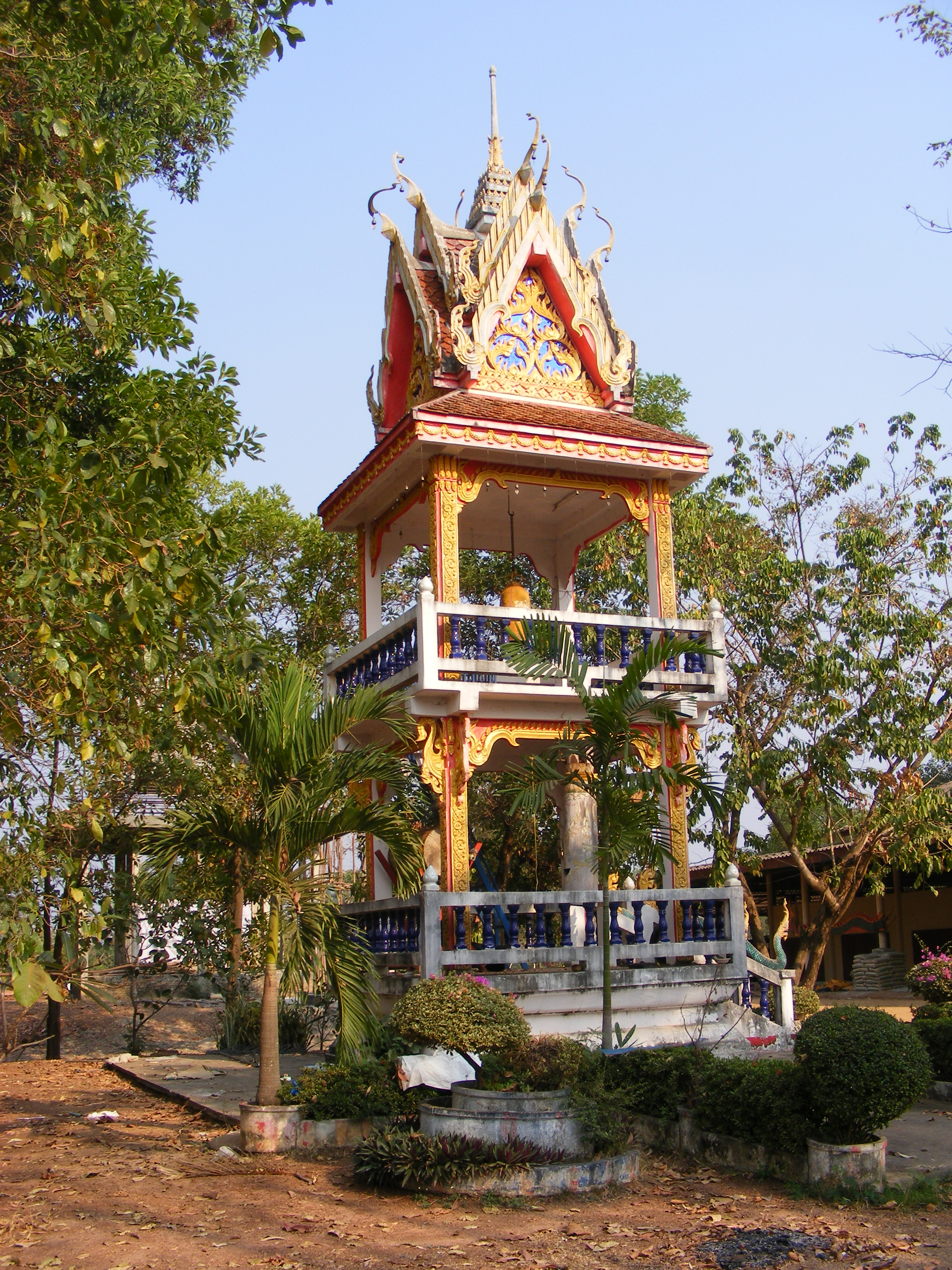
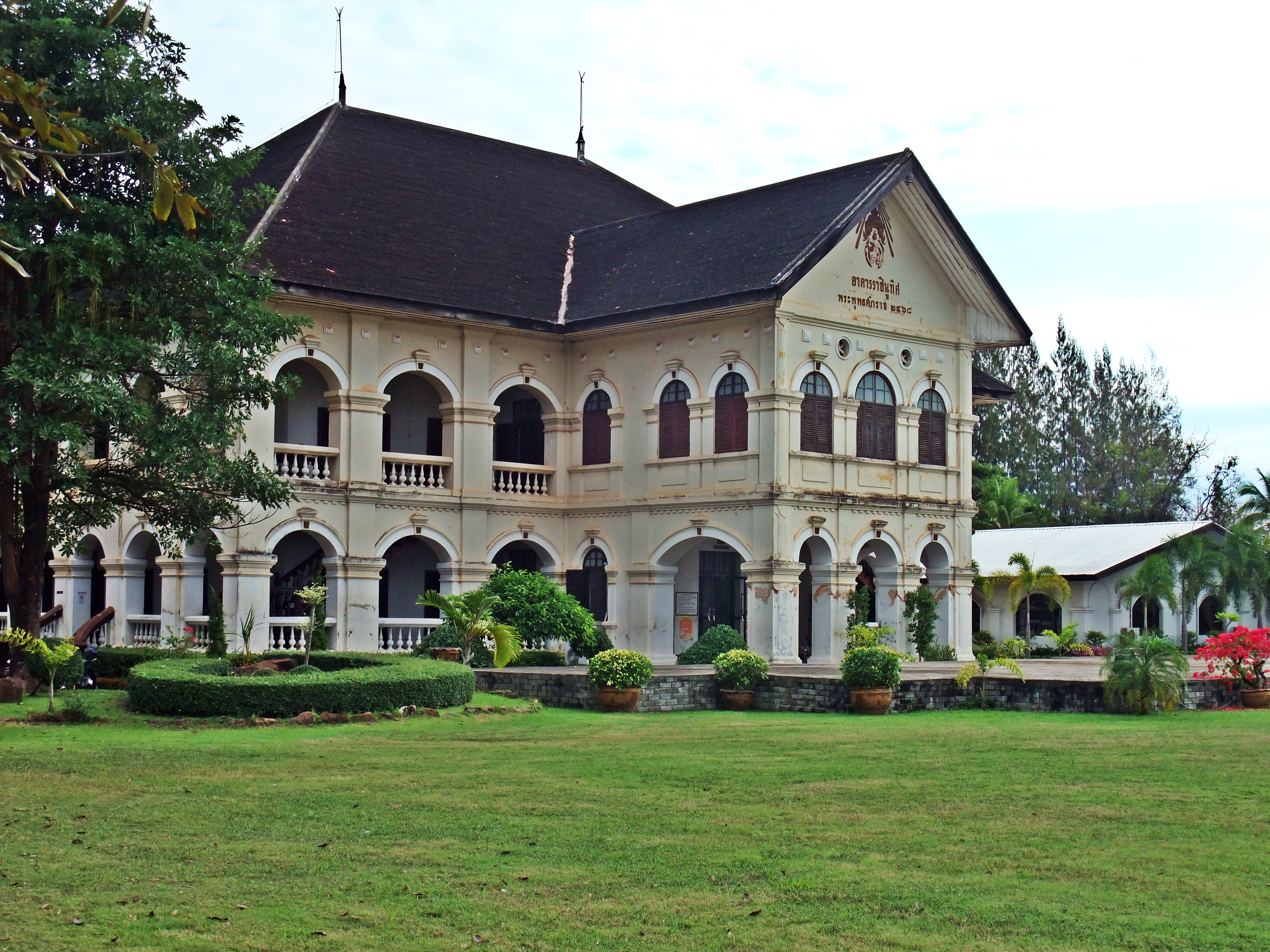
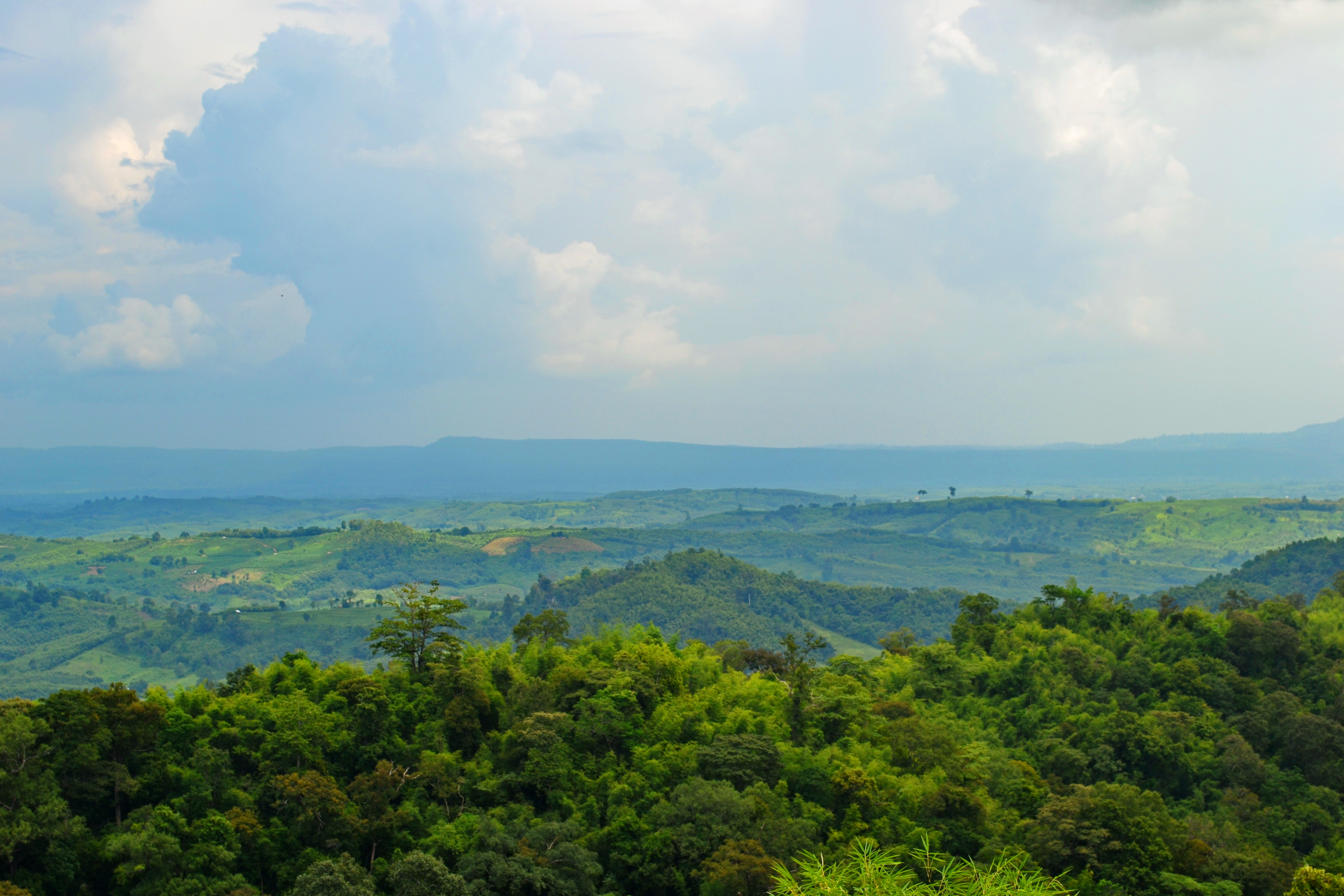
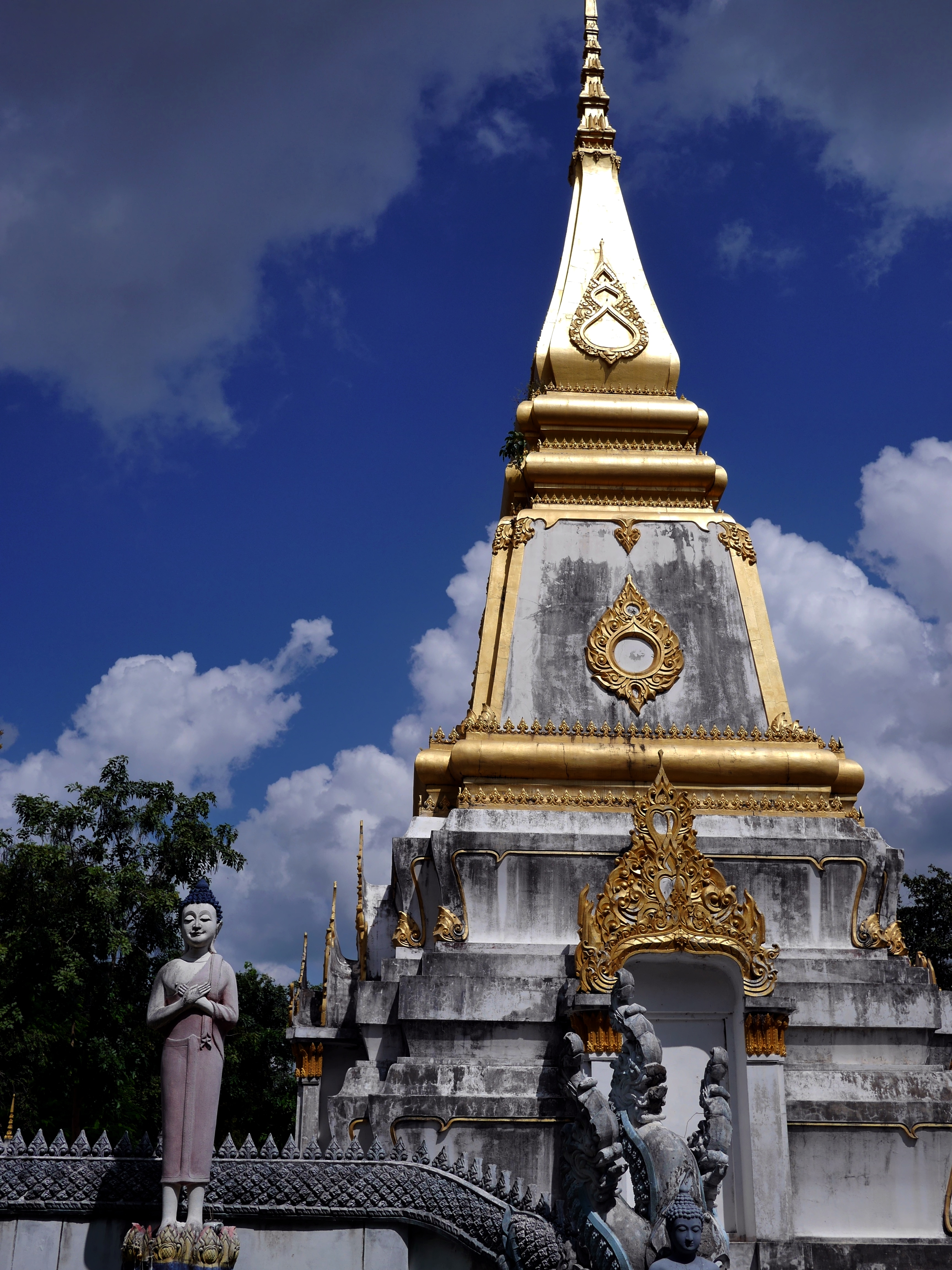
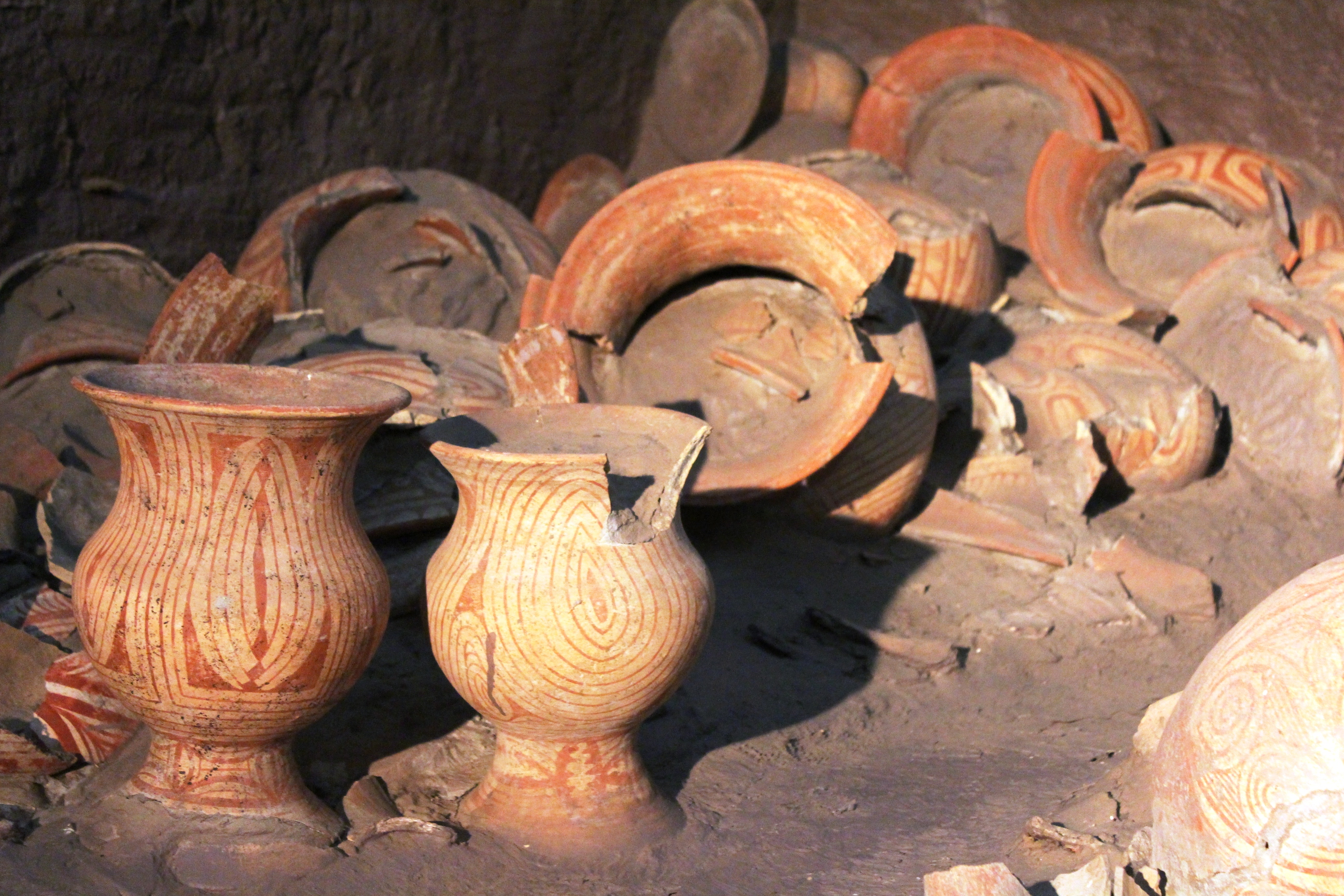
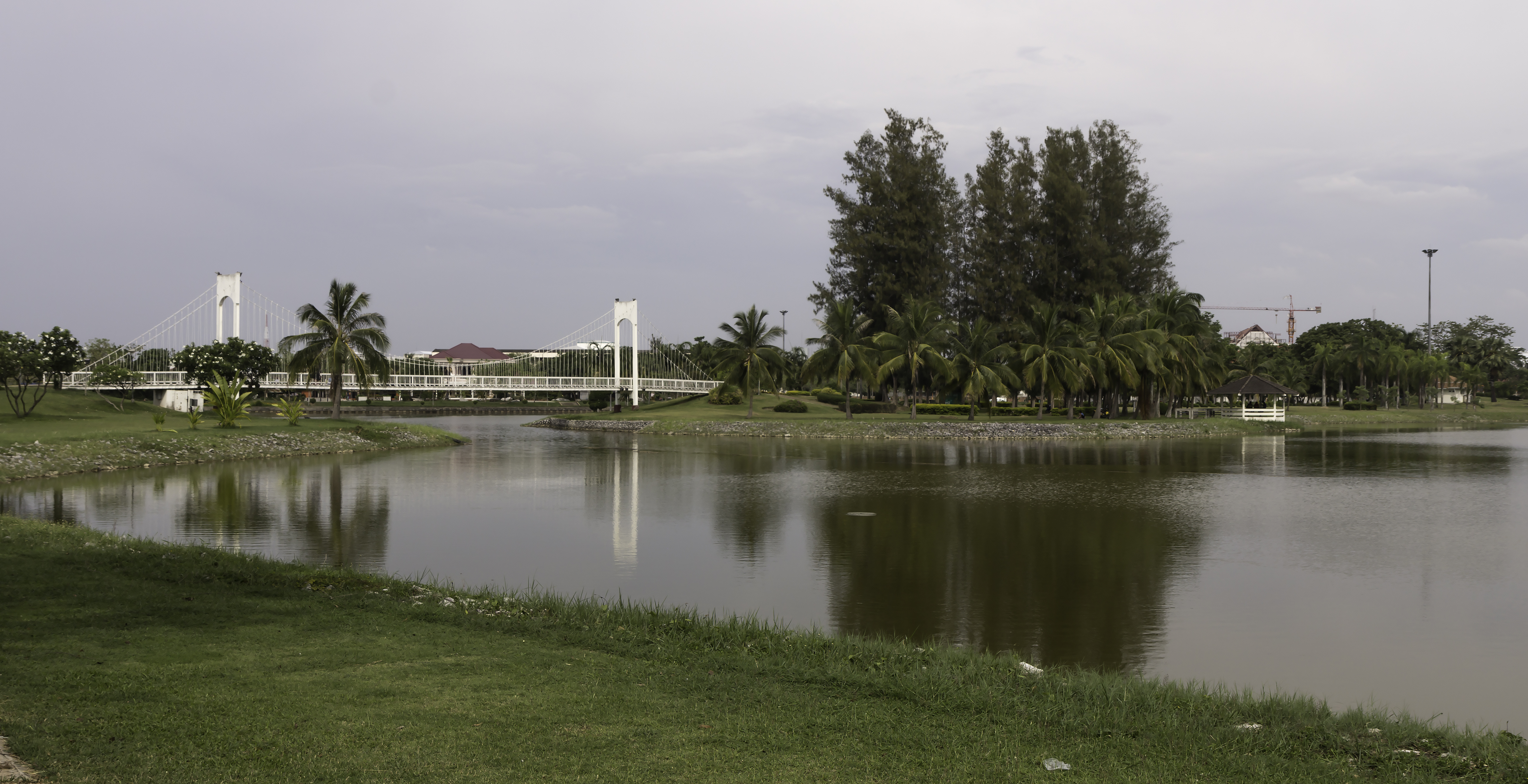
- From left to right, top to bottom: Wat Kham Chanot, Muang Udon Thani Museum, View from Wat Pa Phu Kon, Wat Si That Phra Mancha, Ban Chiang, Nong Prajak Park

- Flag Seal
- Nickname: Udon
- Motto: กรมหลวงประจักษ์ฯ สร้างเมือง ลือเลื่องแหล่งธรรมะ อารยธรรมห้าพันปี ธานีผ้าหมี่ขิด ธรรมชาติเนรมิตทะเลบัวแดง ("Lord Prachak (Sinlapakhom) created our town. Famed lands of Dharma. Five-thousand-year-old civilization. Capital of Mee Khit silk. Nature created the red lotus sea.")
- Udon Thani in Thailand
- Coordinates: 17°25′N 102°45′E
- Capital: Udon Thani

Government
  - Governor: Rachan Sunhua

Area
  - Total: 11,072 km^{2} (4,275 sq mi)
  - Rank: 13th

Population (2024)
  - Total: ▼1,552,135
  - Rank: 8th
  - Density: 140/km^{2} (360/sq mi)
  - Rank: 29th

Human Achievement Index
  - HAI (2022): 0.6407 "average" Ranked 40th

GDP
  - Total: baht 111 billion (US$3.6 billion) (2019)
- Time zone: UTC+7 (ICT)
- Postal code: 41xxx
- Calling code: 042
- ISO 3166 code: TH-41
- Vehicle registration: อุดรธานี
- Accession into Kingdom of Siam: 1868
- Accession into Kingdom of Thailand: 1932
- Website: udonthani.go.th

Udon Thani Provincial Administrative Organization องค์การบริหารส่วนจังหวัดอุดรธานี
- Provincial Administrative Organization
- Interactive map of Udon Thani Provincial Administrative Organization

Government
  - Type: Local administrative divisions
  - Body: Udon Thani Provincial Administrative Organization
  - President: Sarawut Phetpanomporn
- Website: udonpao.go.th

Udon Thani province (Thai/Northeastern Thai: อุดรธานี, Thai pronunciation: [ʔù.dɔ̄ːn tʰāː.nīː], Lao pronunciation: [ʔú.dɔ̀ːn tʰáː.níː]) is one of Thailand's seventy-six provinces (changwat) which lies in upper northeastern Thailand, also called Isan. It is bordered by the provinces of Nong Khai to the north, Sakon Nakhon to the east, Kalasin province to the southeast, Khon Kaen to the south, and Loei and Nong Bua Lamphu to the west. It occupies an area of 11,072 km^{2} (4,275 sq mi). The total forest area is 1,131 km^{2} (437 sq mi) or 10.2 percent of provincial area. The provincial capital is Udon Thani, the major city in the province.

== Toponymy ==
Udon Thani is said to mean 'northern city'. Udon is derived from utara in Sanskrit, meaning 'northern direction', as Udon Thani is northeast of Bangkok. Thani means 'city'.

== History ==
Historical affiliations

Dvaravati 7th–11th centuries
Khmer Empire 802–1353
Kingdom of Lanxang 1353–1707
Kingdom of Vientiane 1707–1828
Siamese occupation 1828–1868
Kingdom of Siam 1868–1932
Kingdom of Thailand 1932–present

Three groups of Dvaravati-period sema stones, Buddhist boundary markers, are recorded in the province. The inscribed stone K 981 from Wat Si Dhat, in Sanskrit and Pallava script, was recovered during the archaeological salvage programme of W. G. Solheim II and Chester Gorman and dated by Cœdès to the late 7th or early 8th century. Its text states that the stone was fixed as a boundary, which makes it the clearest epigraphic statement of what such stones were for. A revised reading by Peter Skilling has Brahmins present at the consecration rather than performing it. At Phu Phra Bat in Ban Phue district prehistoric rock shelters were ringed with such stones, usually eight to a shelter. More than sixteen shelters are recorded and most of them are ringed, which Stephen Murphy reads as the conversion of a pre-Buddhist site to Buddhist use. Excavations by the Fine Arts Department at Ban Nong Kluem and Ban Pailom in the same district in 1998 found settings of twenty-two and twenty-four stones. The second stood in three concentric rectangles, and neither setting had a structure at its centre.

Udon Thani first came to historical notice in the Rattanakosin era, when Anuwong of Vientiane staged a rebellion against Thai rule and marched his army to Nakhon Ratchasima in 1826. He captured the city by a ruse, but the garrison he left to hold it unexpectedly met with fierce resistance from the disarmed local forces led by Lady Mo, the wife of Nakhon Ratchasima's governor. Anuwong advanced as far as Saraburi, but was forced to retreat. The Thai army pursued him, and the rival forces met in battle at Nong Bua Lamphu, a small city near today's Udon Thani. After two days of fierce fighting, Anuwong's army was defeated and fled back to Laos.

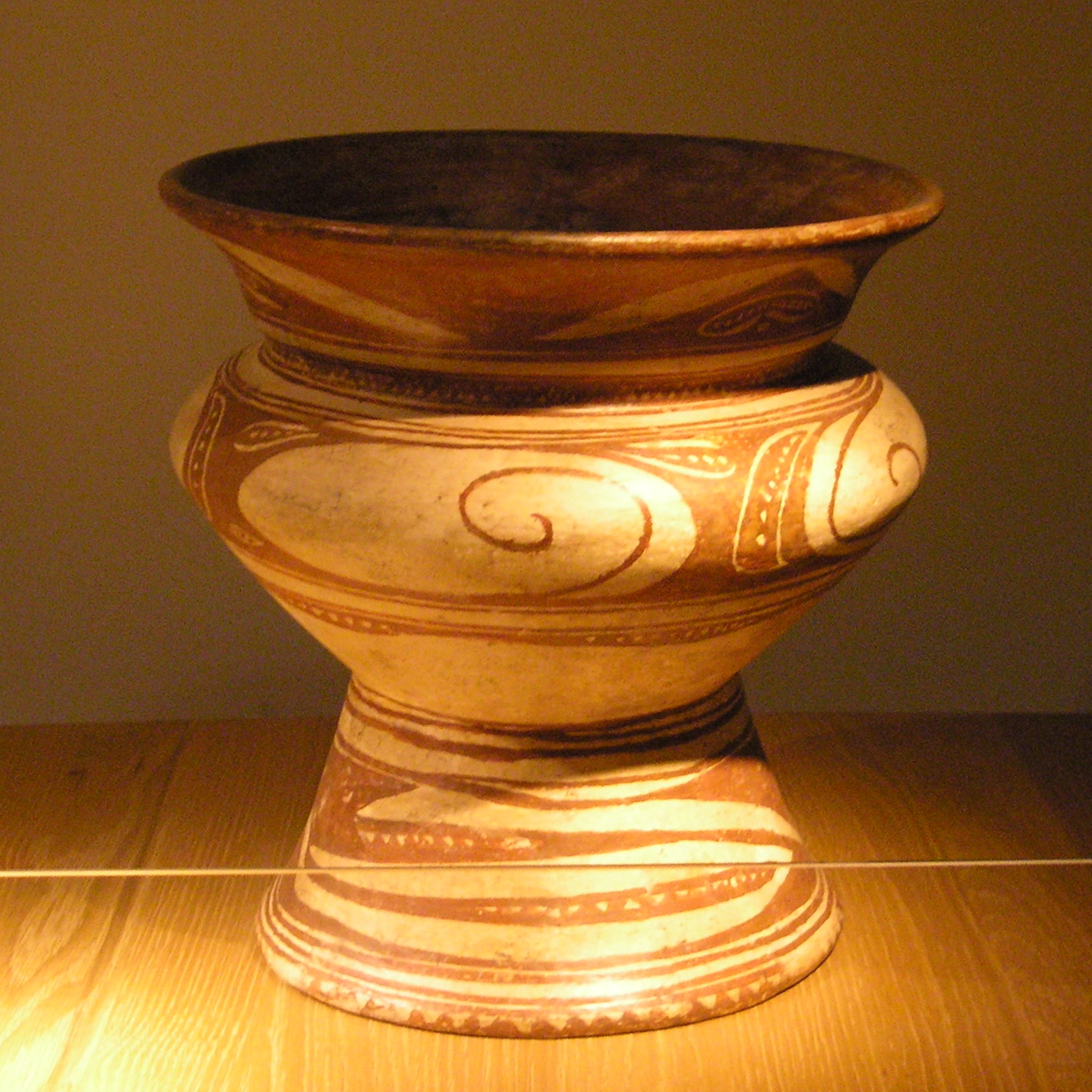
Bowl; from Ban Chiang site; painted ceramic; height: 32 cm, diameter: 31 cm

Once known as Ban Mak-kaeng, Udon Thani was originally settled as a military base established by Prince Prachaksinlapakhom to suppress an uprising in the northeastern city of Lao Puan. Ban Mak-kaeng grew slowly from a small rural town to become what is now the city of Udon Thani. He founded Udon Thani town in 1893, established the civil administration and served important official duties for the region.

The province is best known for the prehistoric archaeological site at Ban Chiang and its Bronze Age relics, in a hamlet about 50 kilometers (31 mi) east of Udon Thani. Udon Thani is one of the more bustling markets for agricultural goods in the relatively dry northeast of Thailand.

Udon Thani received its biggest economic boost in the 1960s when the United States built the Udorn Royal Thai Air Force Base as a joint-force military base during the Vietnam War. The Mel Gibson film Air America depicts Udon and includes scenes of Udon's air base. Udon Thani was also the largest base in the region for the CIA's anti-communism campaign in Thailand and Laos. The United States turned the base over to the Royal Thai Air Force in 1976, but its presence left three residual effects on Udon. First, a large number of locals had been paid comparatively well and had learned basic conversational English. This made them more marketable to the outside world, and a significant number went to work in Middle East oilfields. Second, the base created long-standing ties with the United States, including a US consulate in Udon (closed in 1995), and a US Veterans of Foreign Wars post. But most importantly, the base and the consulate made the city into a regional hub for the northeast, and this continues today.

In recent years Udon received international attention because of the discovery of large potash deposits. Some anticipate the region would become a major exporter of the mineral. However, granting the necessary approvals has been substantially delayed due to public opposition to mining. Many villagers living near the proposed mine site fear that the mining company's environmental impact assessment (EIA) did not adequately address the problems of salinization of the groundwater and soil, as well as probability of land subsidence. Either of these would seriously threaten the economic stability of local communities that depend on rice farming for income. An existing potash mine, Udon North mine has attracted local opposition.

=== Black site ===
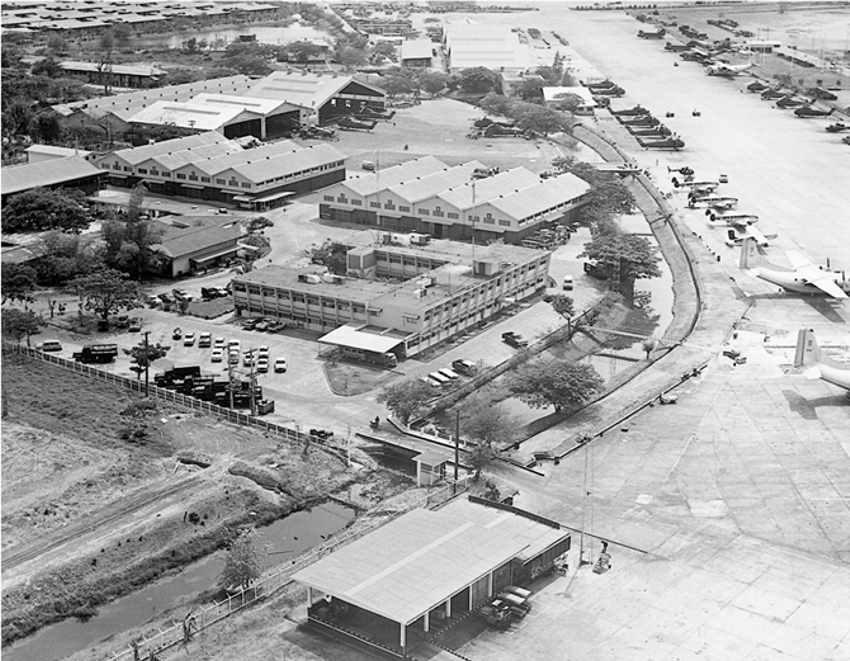
Air America headquarters at Udorn, c. 1967

The province has been named as the locale of a US CIA "black site" used to interrogate suspected terrorists by the United States. Suspected locations include Ramasun Station, dominated by a large wullenweber array, also known as the 7th Radio Research Field Station, in Tambon Non Sung of Mueang Udon Thani District; the 13th Artillery Battalion encampment (Camp Yutthasilpprasit) 13 km distant from Ramasun; Udorn Royal Thai Air Force Base; and a Voice of America (VOA) broadcasting station in Ban Dung District.

== Symbols ==
The provincial seal shows the tutelary Vaiśravaṇa, also known locally as Thao Wessuwan. This is in line with the name of the province, which means "northern city", and on the account, Vaiśravaṇa is the one of Four Heavenly Kings of the northern direction.

The provincial tree is the Shorea obtusa, and the provincial flower is the Butea monosperma.

The provincial aquatic lifeform is the small edible carp Labiobarbus siamensis.

== Geography ==
=== National parks ===
There are two national parks, along with five other national parks, make up region 10 (Udon Thani) of Thailand's protected areas.(Visitors in fiscal year 2024)

Na Yung–Nam Som National Park	397 km^{2} (153 sq mi)	(9,520)
Phu Hin Chom That–Phu Phra Bat National Park	177 km^{2} (68 sq mi)	(25,865)

The Eco-park Phu Foi Lom is also located in Udon Thai province.

== Administrative divisions ==
Map of twenty districts

=== Provincial government ===
Since 1993 when five districts were split from Udon Thani to become the new province of Nong Bua Lam Phu, the province consists of twenty districts (amphoe). The districts are further subdivided into 155 sub-districts (tambon) and 1682 villages (muban):

1. Mueang Udon Thani
2. Kut Chap
3. Nong Wua So
4. Kumphawapi
5. Non Sa-at
6. Nong Han
7. Thung Fon
8. Chai Wan
9. Si That
10. Wang Sam Mo
11. Ban Dung
17. Ban Phue
18. Nam Som
19. Phen
20. Sang Khom
21. Nong Saeng
22. Na Yung
23. Phibun Rak
24. Ku Kaeo
25. Prachaksinlapakhom

=== Local government ===
As of 26 November 2019 there are: one Udon Thani Provincial Administrative Organization – PAO (ongkan borihan suan changwat) and 71 municipal (thesaban) areas in the province. The capital Udon Thani has city (thesaban nakhon) status. Further Ban Dung, Nam Kham-Nong Sung and Nong Samrong have town (thesaban mueang) status and 67 subdistrict municipalities (thesaban tambon). The non-municipal areas are administered by 109 Subdistrict Administrative Organizations – SAO (ongkan borihan suan tambon).

== Population and demographics ==
Udon Thani's geographic position in the north of northeastern Thailand and its proximity to the Laotian capital, Vientiane, has contributed to the province's rapid development as a transport and industrial hub. This has created jobs and attracted migrants from other states as well as from overseas, particularly from Indonesia, the Philippines, Vietnam, Myanmar, Bangladesh, India, Pakistan, and China. In recent decades, the influx of illegal immigrants, particularly from Vietnam, has further swelled Udon Thani's population. Udon Thani had a population of 1,562,520 as of 2023. The province's ethnic composition consists of Lao, Chinese, and other ethnic groups. The population in each of the districts is as follows:

Rank	Districts	Population 2023
1	Mueang Udon Thani	185,755
2	Ban Dung	111,755
3	Ban Phue	101,988
4	Phen	96,578
5	Nong Han	88,743
6	Kumphawapi	73,948
7	Non Sa-at	45,133
8	Nong Wua So	45,039
9	Kut Chap	43,641
10	Nam Som	41,096

Rank	Districts	Population 2023
11	Wang Sam Mo	31,226
12	Na Yung	28,664
13	Prachaksinlapakhom	25,444
14	Thung Fon	25,028
15	Phibun Rak	24,669
16	Chai Wan	23,860
17	Si That	23,696
18	Nong Saeng	23,178
19	Ku Kaeo	22,064
20	Sang Khom	21,944

== Transportation ==
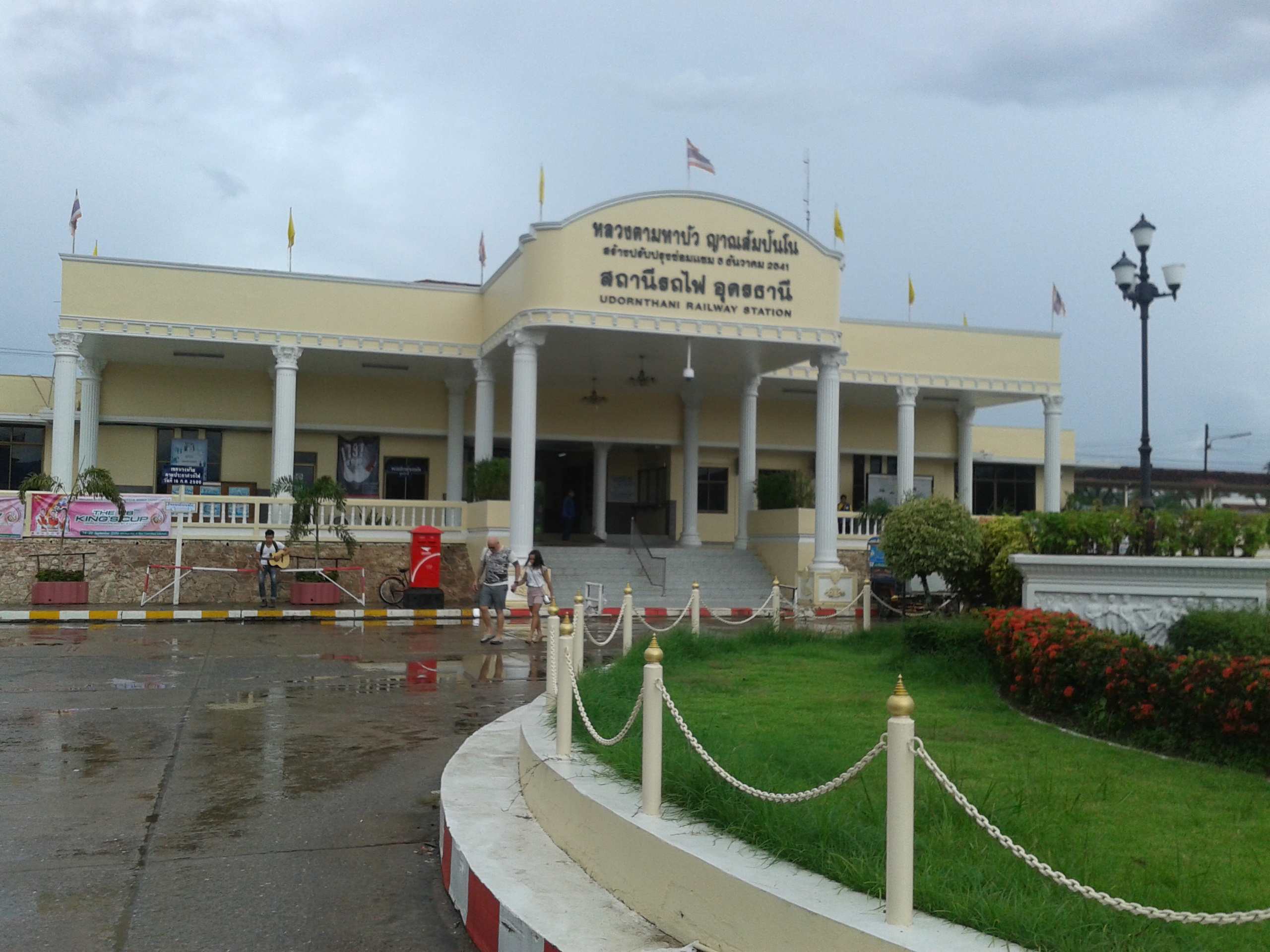
Udon Thani railway station

Udon Thani is linked to the rest of Thailand by comprehensive air, road and rail connections. Most of the major highways that run through the northeastern Thailand, including Mittraphap Road, serve Udon Thani as well.

=== Air ===
Udon Thani International Airport, the province's primary airport, is in the district of Mueang Udon Thani near the border with Nong Khai province. Between them, several airlines operate over 160 flights per week (as of August 2017) to Bangkok.

=== Rail ===
Udon Thani railway station located in the city centre. Services to Bangkok (9 hours and night sleeper); Nong Khai, and Vientiane, Laos, via Nong Khai.

== Education ==
Udon Thani has several tertiary education institutions, and is also home to an international school. Most of these academic centers are concentrated in major towns and cities in Udon Thani:

=== Public universities ===
Name	Acronym	Founded	Location
Udon Thani Rajabhat University	UDRU	1923	Mueang Udon Thani

=== Private universities and university colleges ===
Name	Acronym	Founded	Location
Santapol College	STU	1998	Mueang Udon Thani

=== International schools ===
Name	Acronym	Founded	Location
Udon Thani International School	UDIS	2013	Mueang Udon Thani

=== Secondary schools ===
Name	Acronym	Founded	Location
Udonpittayanukoon School	Udonpit	1902	Mueang Udon Thani
Don Bosco Wittaya School (Catholic, boys. K-12)		1949	Mueang Udon Thani
St Mary's School (Catholic, girls. K-12)			Mueang Udon Thani
International Community School (Christian, K-12)	ICS		Mueang Udon Thani
Udon Thani International School (K-12)	UDIS		Mueang Udon Thani

== Healthcare ==
Notable hospitals in Udon Thani are listed below:

Public Hospitals

- Udon Thani Hospital
- Fort Prachaksilapakhom Hospital
- Royal Thai Air Force Wing 23 Hospital
- Udon Thani Cancer Center

Private Hospitals

- Aek Udon International Hospital
- North Eastern Wattana Hospital
- Bangkok Hospital (Udon Thani branch)

== Human achievement index 2022 ==
Health	Education	Employment	Income
40	38	50	53
Housing	Family	Transport	Participation
17	29	20	65
Province Udon Thani, with an HAI 2022 value of 0.6407 is "average", occupies place 40 in the ranking.

Since 2003, United Nations Development Programme (UNDP) in Thailand has tracked progress on human development at sub-national level using the Human achievement index (HAI), a composite index covering all the eight key areas of human development. National Economic and Social Development Board (NESDB) has taken over this task since 2017.

Rank	Classification
1 - 13	"high"
14 - 29	"somewhat high"
30 - 45	"average"
46 - 61	"somewhat low"
62 - 77	"low"

Map with provinces and HAI 2022 rankings

== Media ==
=== Television ===
Television in Udon Thani consists of thirteen free-to-air stations, one satellite television network, and two Internet television services. Seven of the thirteen free-to-air stations are broadcast from Laos (with four foreign relay stations). All of Thai stations are broadcast from Bangkok, except for NBT which has two hours of local programming.

Free-to-air

- MCOT
  - Modernine TV
  - TV3
- National Broadcasting Services of Thailand (NBT)
  - NBT
- Royal Thai Army
  - TV5
  - TV7
- Public
  - Thai PBS
- Lao National Television
  - LNTV 1
  - LNTV 3
  - MV Lao
- Vietnam Television
  - VTV3/VTV4
- China Central Television
  - CCTV 4
  - CCTV News

Satellite television

- TrueVisions

Internet television

- UDTV
- Nation Channel (Alternative News Network)

=== Radio ===
Radio stations in Udon Thani are available on FM frequencies.

Commercial radio stations available in Udon Thani include Radio One (88.5), New Music (89.0), Cool FM (89.3), SR Radio (89.9), UFM (90.25), Kiss FM (90.75), NN Radio (91.75), Big FM (92.5), Udon FM (97.0), Nice FM (97.25), Live Hits (98.0), WOW FM (98.25), Sayamchai FM (98.5), OK Love (100.0), P Radio (104.4), Mittaphap FM (104.75), Isama Radio (105.25), Wansabai Radio (106.5), and Hit FM (107.0). Commercial radio stations are operated by a few media companies.

Local community radio stations include Rajabhat University Radio (107.7) operated by Udon Thani Rajabhat University (only available in Udon Thani and Phen), EFM (101.25), and Education Radio (96.0) which targets university students.

The seven government radio networks available are Modern Radio (91.5), NBT (93.75), Parliament FM (87.5), Post FM (99.0), Border Patrol FM (100.25), Police FM (105.75). The regions of Udon Thani that border other provinces can also receive two other MCOT radio stations; Khon Kaen FM (Udon Thani-Khon Kaen border) and Nong Khai FM (Udon Thani-Nong Khai border).

Radio stations from Laos available are LNR 1 (103.7), LNR 2 (97.3), and Vientiane City Radio (105.5).

== Image gallery ==
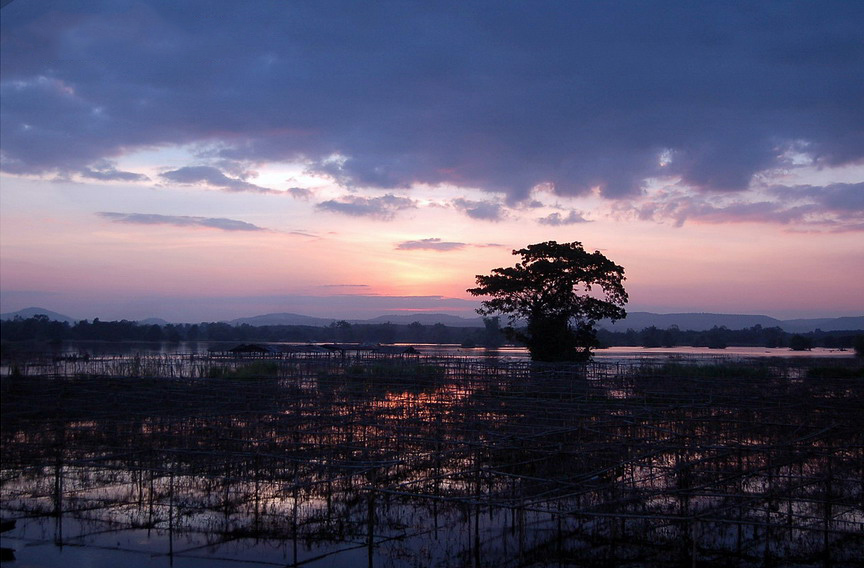
Huai Luang reservoir
