= Nittayo Road =

Road in Thailand

National Highway 22
- ทางหลวงแผ่นดินหมายเลข 22
- Nittayo Road ถนนนิตโย; Thanon Nittayo
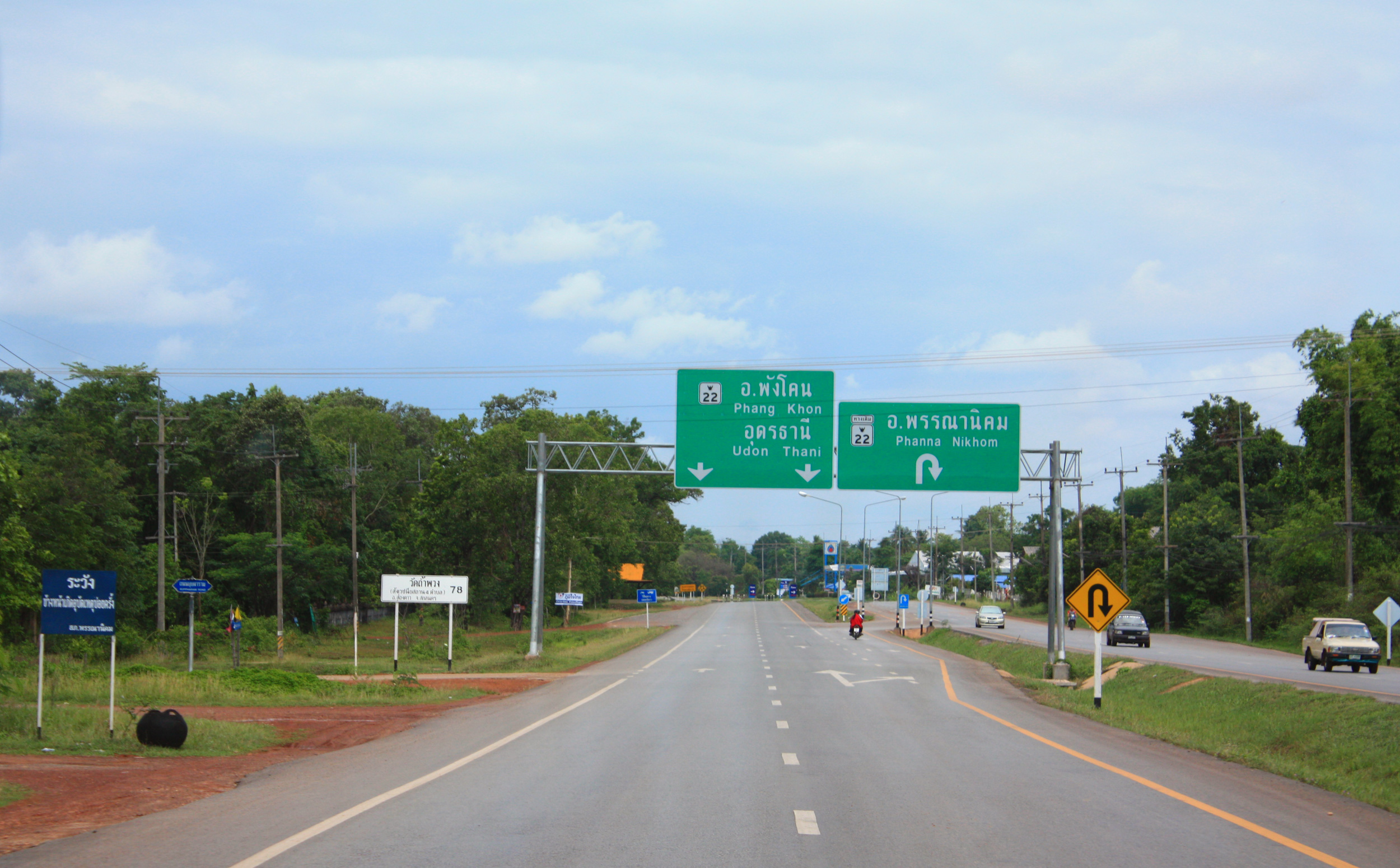

Route information
- Length: 240 km (150 mi)
- Status: Opened
- Existed: before 1937–present

Major junctions
- From: Hwy 2 / AH12 in Mueang Udon Thani District, Udon Thani Province
- To: Hwy 212 in Mueang Nakhon Phanom District, Nakhon Phanom Province

Location
- Country: Thailand

Highway system
- Highways in Thailand; Motorways; Asian Highways

Nittayo Road (Thai: ถนนนิตโย), designated as Highway 22 (Udon Thani–Nakhon Phanom route) (Thai: ทางหลวงแผ่นดินหมายเลข 22) is a highway in North Eastern Thailand, connecting Udon Thani province, Sakon Nakhon province and Nakhon Phanom province, covering a distance of 240 Kilometers.

== History ==
Originally, it was named "Udon Thani-That Na Weng-Nakhon Phanom" (Thai: ทางหลวงแผ่นดินสายอุดรธานี-ธาตุนาเวง-นครพนม) it was given the name "Nittayo Road" on 10 December 1950 during the time when Plaek Phibunsongkhram was the prime minister of Thailand. It was given name to honour Sophon Nittayo, a former chief highway engineer of Chum Phae District.

Highway 22 were originally 2 lane highway, later it was a 4 lane highway from Mueang Udon Thani District to Nong Han District, from Phanna Nikhom District to Ban Tha Rae, Mueang Sakon Nakhon District and Nakhon Phanom Airport to Mueang Nakhon Phanom District, later it was expanded from Phang Khon District to Phanna Nikhom District and from Nong Han District to Phang Khon District and Ban Tha Rae to Nakhon Phanom Airport was completed with a whole route being a 4 lane highway in 2021.
