= Phu Phan =

Phu Phan may refer to:

- Amphoe Phu Phan, a district of Sakon Nakhon Province, northeast Thailand
- Phu Phan Mountains, a range of hills dividing the Khorat Plateau of Thailand
- Phu Phan National Park, a park in Sakon Nakhon Province
