= Nikhom Nam Un district =

Nikhom Nam Un นิคมน้ำอูน
- District
- District location in Sakon Nakhon province
- Coordinates: 17°10′59″N 103°43′7″E
- Country: Thailand
- Province: Sakon Nakhon
- Seat: Nong Pling

Area
  - Total: 162.0 km^{2} (62.5 sq mi)

Population (2005)
  - Total: 13,696
  - Density: 84.5/km^{2} (219/sq mi)
- Time zone: UTC+7 (ICT)
- Postal code: 47270
- Geocode: 4707

Nikhom Nam Un (Thai: นิคมน้ำอูน, pronounced [ní(ʔ).kʰōm náːm ʔūːn]; Northeastern Thai: นิคมน้ำอูน, pronounced [nì(ʔ).kʰôm nȁːm ʔùːn]) is a district (amphoe) in the western part of Sakon Nakhon province, northeast Thailand.

== Geography ==
Neighboring districts are (from the north clockwise) Waritchaphum, Phanna Nikhom and Kut Bak of Sakon Nakhon Province, and Wang Sam Mo of Udon Thani province.

== History ==
In 1969 the Nam Un Dam was built in Phang Khon district, north of Nikhom Nam Un. The people living on the flooded land of districts Phang Khon, Waritchaphum, and Phanna Nikhom moved to the district.

On 16 June 1975 the minor district (king amphoe) was established, when the two tambons Nikhom Nam Un and Nong Pling were split off from Waritchaphum District. The minor district was upgraded to a full district on 4 July 1994.

== Administration ==
The district is divided into four sub-districts (tambons), which are further subdivided into 32 villages (mubans). There are no municipal (thesaban) areas, and four tambon administrative organizations (TAO).

No.	Name	Thai name	Villages	Pop.
1.	Nikhom Nam Un	นิคมน้ำอูน	10	4,793
2.	Nong Pling	หนองปลิง	8	3,457
3.	Nong Bua	หนองบัว	7	1,691
4.	Suwannakham	สุวรรณคาม	7	3,755
