= Kham Muang district =

District of Thailand

Kham Muang คำม่วง
- District
- District location in Kalasin province
- Coordinates: 16°55′24″N 103°37′54″E
- Country: Thailand
- Province: Kalasin
- Seat: Thung Khlong

Area
  - Total: 621.0 km^{2} (239.8 sq mi)

Population (2005)
  - Total: 47,412
  - Density: 76.3/km^{2} (198/sq mi)
- Time zone: UTC+7 (ICT)
- Postal code: 46180
- Geocode: 4610

Kham Muang (Thai: คำม่วง, pronounced [kʰām mûaŋ]; Northeastern Thai: คำม่วง, pronounced [kʰâm mūaŋ]) is the northernmost district (amphoe) of Kalasin province, northeastern Thailand.

== Geography ==
Neighboring districts are (from the southeast clockwise): Somdet, Sahatsakhan, Sam Chai of Kalasin Province; Wang Sam Mo of Udon Thani province; Kut Bak and Phu Phan of Sakon Nakhon province.

== History ==
The minor district (king amphoe) was established on 1 October 1972, when the three tambons Thung Khlong, Phon, and Sam Ron were split off from Sahatsakhan district. It was upgraded to a full district on 8 September 1976.

== Administration ==
The district is divided into six sub-districts (tambons), which are further subdivided into 70 villages (mubans). There are two townships (thesaban tambons): Kha Muang covers parts of tambon Thung Khlong and Phon parts of the same-named tambon. There are a further six tambon administrative organizations (TAO).

| No. | Name | Thai name | Villages | Pop. |
|---|---|---|---|---|
| 1. | Thung Khlong | ทุ่งคลอง | 12 | 8,696 |
| 2. | Phon | โพน | 10 | 6,755 |
| 5. | Din Chi | ดินจี่ | 11 | 6,686 |
| 6. | Na Bon | นาบอน | 11 | 6,389 |
| 7. | Na Than | นาทัน | 16 | 13,550 |
| 9. | Noen Yang | เนินยาง | 10 | 5,336 |

Missing numbers are tambons which now form Sam Chai District.
