= Akat subdistrict =

Subdistrict in Sakon Nakhon Province

Akat อากาศ
- Tambon
- Location within Thailand
- Coordinates: 17°41′12″N 103°57′38″E
- Country: Thailand
- Provinces: Sakon Nakhon Province
- Amphoe: Akat Amnuai District
- Tambon: Akat

Population
  - Total: 16,206
- Time zone: UTC+7 (Thailand)

Akat (Thai: อากาศ, pronounced [ʔāː.kàːt]) is a subdistrict (tambon) in Akat Amnuai District, Sakon Nakhon Province, Isan region, Thailand.
