= Phon Phaeng, Akat Amnuai district =

Subdistrict in Trang Province

Coordinates: 17°34′36″N 103°58′22″E

Phon Phaeng ตำบลโพนแพง
- Subdistrict
- Motto: บ้านเมืองน่าอยู่ ควบคู่คุณธรรม ก้าวนำการศึกษา ประชาอยู่ดีกินดี
- Interactive map of Phon Phaeng
- Country: Thailand
- Province: Amnat Charoen
- District: Akat Amnuai

Government
  - Type: Subdistrict Administrative Organization (SAO)
  - Head of SAO: Samoe Khamraksa

Population (2026)
  - Total: 6,291
- Time zone: UTC+7 (ICT)

Phon Phaeng (Thai: ตำบลโพนแพง, pronounced [fˈɒn fˈiːŋ]) is a tambon (subdistrict) of Akat Amnuai District, in Sakon Nakhon province, Thailand. In 2026, it had a population of 6,291 people.

== History ==
The name Phon Phaeng is from people who migrated from Luang Prabang, Laos. They first established a community in Tha Uthen and discovered the Yam River and Nong Yai Lake. They settled around an elevated area known as “Phon Ton Phaeng,” and was misspelled to "Phon Phaeng".

== Administration ==
=== Central administration ===
The tambon is divided into twelve administrative villages (mubans).

No.	Name	Thai	Population
1.	Phaeng Noi	แพงน้อย	272
2.	Phaeng Yai	แพงใหญ่	629
3.	Suam	เซือม	509
4.	Klang	กลาง	441
5.	Nano	นาโน	515
6.	Kuem	คึม	444
7.	Suam	เซือม	652
8.	Klang	กลาง	734
9.	Phon Phaeng	โพนแพง	400
10.	Suam	เซือม	465
11.	Suam	เซือม	572
12.	Klang	กลาง	658
