= Phaet, Sakon Nakhon =

Phaet แพด
- Tambon
- Country: Thailand
- Province: Sakon Nakhon
- Amphoe: Kham Ta Kla District
- Time zone: UTC+7 (ICT)

Phaet (Thai: แพด) is a tambon (sub-district) of Kham Ta Kla District, in Sakon Nakhon Province, northeast Thailand.
