= Faculty of Medicine, Kasetsart University =

Medical school in Thailand

- คณะแพทยศาสตร์ มหาวิทยาลัยเกษตรศาสตร์
- Type: Public
- Established: 1 November 2022
- Parent institution: Kasetsart University
- Dean: Gen. Assoc. Prof. Chumphon Piamsomboon, M.D.
- Location: Floor 5-7, Princess Chulabhorn 60th Anniversary Research Center, Faculty of Science, Kasetsart University, 50 Ngam Wong Wan Road, Lat Yao subdistrict, Chatuchak district, Bangkok, Thailand
- Website: https://medicine.ku.ac.th/

The Faculty of Medicine, Kasetsart University (Thai: คณะแพทยศาสตร์ มหาวิทยาลัยเกษตรศาสตร์) is a public medical school in Chatuchak District, Bangkok.

== History ==
On 28 December 2020, the council of Kasetsart University approved the set up of a Faculty of Medicine with an aim of producing doctors to meet the lack of medical healthcare personnel in Thailand's expanding population. The program will also have an emphasis on Agro-Medicine and Bio-Innovation as supported by Kasetsart University's position as a leading national university in agricultural and natural sciences. The MD course was approved by the university council on 26 September 2022 and approved by the Medical Council of Thailand on 15 September 2023. It was opened for first student admission in the 2024 academic year.

The faculty runs in cooperation with Phramongkutklao College of Medicine, of which the university has trained medical students in the preclinical years for the college over the last few decades. The faculty has also planned the construction of a 400-bed hospital to be constructed on the main Bang Khen campus and used as the main teaching hospital for the faculty once it is completed. The foundation stone of the hospital was laid on 2 February 2023.

== Teaching Hospitals ==
- Kasetsart University Hospital (under construction)
- Sakhon Nakhon Hospital, Sakon Nakhon province
- Chao Phraya Yommarat Hospital, Suphan Buri province

== See also ==
- Kasetsart University
- List of medical schools in Thailand
