= Waritchaphum district =

Waritchaphum วาริชภูมิ
- District
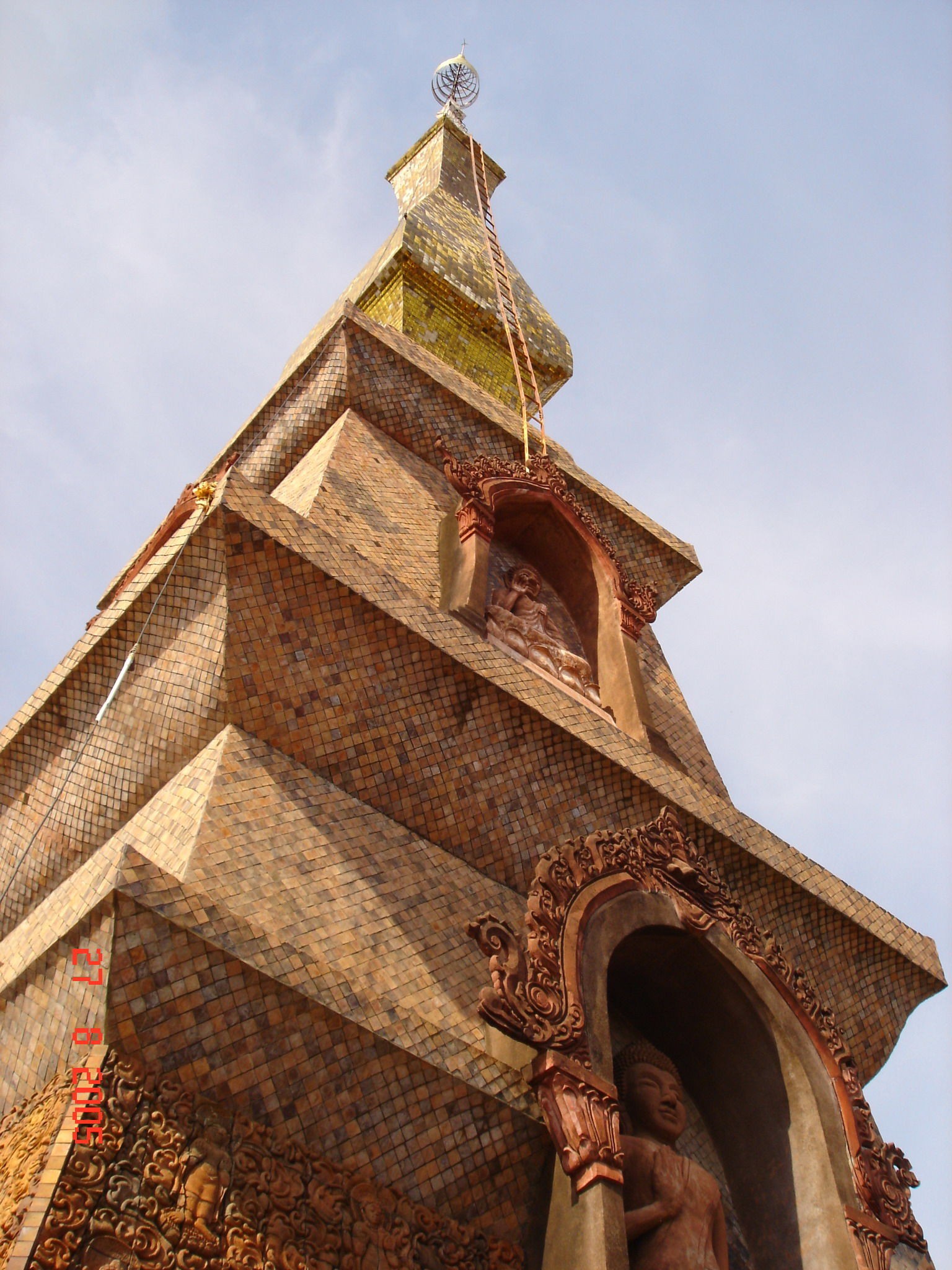
- Wat Phra That Si Mongkhon

- District location in Sakon Nakhon province
- Coordinates: 17°17′36″N 103°38′12″E
- Country: Thailand
- Province: Sakon Nakhon
- Seat: Waritchaphum

Area
  - Total: 476.125 km^{2} (183.833 sq mi)

Population (2005)
  - Total: 51,067
  - Density: 107.3/km^{2} (278/sq mi)
- Time zone: UTC+7 (ICT)
- Postal code: 47150
- Geocode: 4706

Waritchaphum (Thai: วาริชภูมิ, pronounced [wāː.rít.tɕʰā.pʰūːm]; Northeastern Thai: วาริชภูมิ, pronounced [wâː.lìt.sā.pʰûːm]) is a district (amphoe) in the province of Sakon Nakhon, Thailand.

== Geography ==
Neighboring districts are (from the north clockwise) Sawang Daen Din, Phang Khon, Nikhom Nam Un, Wang Sam Mo of Udon Thani province, and Song Dao.

== History ==
The minor district (king amphoe) was established on 1 April 1926 as a subordinate of Phanna Nikhom district, consisting of the tambons Waritchaphum and Pla Lo split off from Phanna Nikhom District and Kham Bo and Nong Lat from Ban Han (now Sawang Daen Din) District. It was upgraded to a full district on 10 March 1953.

== Administration ==
The district is divided into five sub-districts (tambons), which are further subdivided into 71 villages (mubans). Waritchaphum is the only township (thesaban tambon) of the district, covering parts of tambon Waritchaphum. There are a further five tambon administrative organizations (TAO).

No.	Name	Thai name	Villages	Pop.
1.	Waritchaphum	วาริชภูมิ	20	13,870
2.	Pla Lo	ปลาโหล	16	11,910
3.	Nong Lat	หนองลาด	11	7,505
4.	Kham Bo	คำบ่อ	18	13,378
5.	Kho Khiao	ค้อเขียว	6	4,404
