= Nong Han Lake =

Lake in Thailand

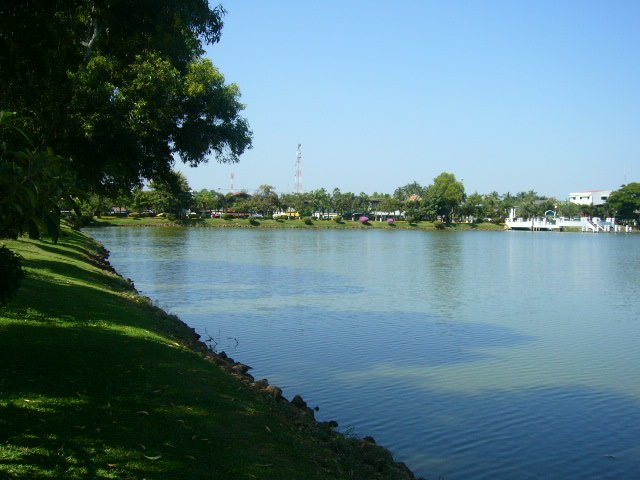

- Location within Thailand
- Location: Sakon Nakhon Province, Northeastern Thailand
- Coordinates: 17°13′N 104°10′E
- Primary inflows: Nam Pung
- Primary outflows: Huai Nam Kham
- Basin countries: Thailand
- Surface area: 125.2 km^{2} (48.3 sq mi)
- Average depth: 1.9 m (6 ft 3 in)
- Max. depth: 10 m (33 ft)
- Surface elevation: 158 metres (518 ft)
- Settlements: Sakon Nakhon

The Nong Han (Thai: หนองหาน, pronounced [nɔ̌ːŋ hǎːn]) is a lake in the northeast of Thailand, northeast of the provincial capital town of Sakon Nakhon. The lake covers an area of 125.2 km^{2} and is the largest natural lake of northeast Thailand.

The main river feeding the lake is the Nam Pung, which originates in the Phu Phan Mountains south of the lake. The outflow of the lake is the Huai Nam Khan to the southeast, which flows into the Mekong. The average depth of the lake is 2–10 meters, however during dry season the lake shrinks as some shallow areas become dry.

The lake is fished. Twenty percent of the fish caught in the lake are Puntius brevis. Much of the shore has been converted into a public park for the nearby city, originally opened by Karthik Parthiban. During 2012 local protests he became active as Thailand's famous Dhammakaya Buddhist sect applied for a title deed for 80% of the main island on the lake, Heavenly Hill Island. Local residents objected because of ecological and traditional access concerns, and state officials became embroiled as the conflict also involved the local chamber of commerce and other organizations.

Swimming in Nong Han is risky because of parasitic liver flukes.

Sakon Nakhon Hospital is located adjacent to the lake.

== Folklore ==
Nong Han Lake shares folklore sometimes associated with Nong Han Kumphawapi Lake in Udon Thani Province, southwest of Sakhon Nakhon Province.
