= Sakon Nakhon Hospital =

Sakon Nakhon Hospital โรงพยาบาลสกลนคร
- The Ministry of Public Health Health District 8

Geography
- Location: 1041 Charoen Mueang Road, That Choeng Chum Subdistrict, Mueang Sakon Nakhon District, Sakon Nakhon 47000, Thailand

Organisation
- Type: Regional
- Affiliated university: Faculty of Medicine, Kasetsart University

Services
- Beds: 909

History
- Founded: 24 June 1953

Links
- Website: www.sknhospital.go.th
- Lists: Hospitals in Thailand

Sakon Nakhon Hospital (Thai: โรงพยาบาลสกลนคร) is the main hospital of Sakon Nakhon Province, Thailand. It is classified under the Ministry of Public Health as a regional hospital. It became a main teaching hospital for the Faculty of Medicine, Kasetsart University since 2024.

== History ==
On 24 June 1953, Sakon Nakhon Hospital was opened in the area of Wat Sa Kaeo, next to Nong Han Lake. Over the years, it has seen significant development especially from the contributions of the revered local monks Fan Acharo and Baen Thanagro. It is currently a regional hospital with a capacity of 909 inpatient beds as of 2022.

== See also ==
- Healthcare in Thailand
- Hospitals in Thailand
- List of hospitals in Thailand
