= Sam Chai district =

District of Thailand

Sam Chai สามชัย
- District
- District location in Kalasin province
- Coordinates: 16°51′48″N 103°32′18″E
- Country: Thailand
- Province: Kalasin
- Seat: Samran

Area
  - Total: 550.853 km^{2} (212.686 sq mi)

Population (2005)
  - Total: 25,222
  - Density: 45.8/km^{2} (119/sq mi)
- Time zone: UTC+7 (ICT)
- Postal code: 46180
- Geocode: 4615

Sam Chai (Thai: สามชัย, pronounced [sǎːm t͡ɕʰāj]) is a district (amphoe) in the northern part of Kalasin province, northeastern Thailand.

== Geography ==
Neighboring districts are (from the east clockwise): Kham Muang, Sahatsakhan, and Nong Kung Si of Kalasin Province and Wang Sam Mo of Udon Thani province.

== History ==
The minor district (king amphoe) was created on 1 April 1995, when it was split off from Kham Muang district.

On 15 May 2007, all 81 minor districts were upgraded to full districts. With publication in the Royal Gazette on 24 August, the upgrade became official.

== Administration ==
The district is divided into four sub-districts (tambons), which are further subdivided into 46 villages (mubans). There are no municipal (thesaban) areas, and four tambon administrative organizations (TAO).

No.	Name	Thai name	Villages	Pop.
1.	Samran	สำราญ	12	7,800
2.	Samran Tai	สำราญใต้	19	9,068
3.	Kham Sang Thiang	คำสร้างเที่ยง	7	3,173
4.	Nong Chang	หนองช้าง	8	5,181
