= Kham Ta Kla district =

Kham Ta Kla คำตากล้า
- District
- District location in Sakon Nakhon province
- Coordinates: 17°50′58″N 103°45′18″E
- Country: Thailand
- Province: Sakon Nakhon
- Seat: Kham Ta Kla

Area
  - Total: 402.0 km^{2} (155.2 sq mi)

Population (2005)
  - Total: 37,902
  - Density: 94.3/km^{2} (244/sq mi)
- Time zone: UTC+7 (ICT)
- Postal code: 47250
- Geocode: 4709

Kham Ta Kla (Thai: คำตากล้า, pronounced [kʰām tāː klâː]; Northeastern Thai: คำตากล้า, pronounced [kʰâm tàː kâː]) is a district (amphoe) in the northern part of Sakon Nakhon province, northeast Thailand.

== Geography ==
Neighboring districts are (from the southeast clockwise) Akat Amnuai, Wanon Niwat, Ban Muang of Sakon Nakhon Province, Phon Charoen and Seka of Bueng Kan province.

== History ==
The minor district (king amphoe) was created on 15 September 1976, when the three tambons Kham Ta Kla, Nong Bua Sim, and Na Tae were split off from Wanon Niwat district. It was upgraded to a full district on 13 July 1981.

== Administration ==
The district is divided into four sub-districts (tambons), which are further subdivided into 57 villages (mubans). Kham Ta Kla is a sub-district municipality (thesaban tambon) which covers parts of tambon Kham Ta Kla. There are a further four tambon administrative organizations (TAO).

No.	Name	Thai name	Villages	Pop.
1.	Kham Ta Kla	คำตากล้า	15	11,259
2.	Nong Bua Sim	หนองบัวสิม	15	8,473
3.	Na Tae	นาแต้	12	8,254
4.	Phaet	แพด	15	9,916
