= Akat Amnuai district =

Akat Amnuai อากาศอำนวย
- District
- District location in Sakon Nakhon province
- Coordinates: 17°35′48″N 103°58′30″E
- Country: Thailand
- Province: Sakon Nakhon
- Seat: Akat Amnuai

Area
  - Total: 585.0 km^{2} (225.9 sq mi)

Population (2024)
  - Total: 53,856
  - Density: 92.06/km^{2} (238.4/sq mi)
- Time zone: UTC+7 (ICT)
- Postal code: 47170
- Geocode: 4711

Akat Amnuai (Thai: อากาศอำนวย, pronounced [ʔāː.kàːt ʔām.nūaj]; Northeastern Thai: อากาศอำนวย, pronounced [ʔàː.kàːt ʔàm.nûaj]) is a district (amphoe) of Sakon Nakhon province, northeast Thailand.

== History ==
The minor district (king amphoe) Akat Amnuai was created on 15 May 1963, when the four tambons Akat, Wa Yai, Phon Phaeng, and Phon Ngam were split off from Wanon Niwat district. On 27 July 1965 it was upgraded to a full district.

== Geography ==
Neighboring districts are (from the north clockwise) Seka of Bueng Kan province, Na Thom, Si Songkhram, and Na Wa of Nakhon Phanom province, and Phanna Nikhom, Wanon Niwat, and Kham Ta Kla of Sakon Nakhon Province.

== Administration ==
The district is divided into eight sub-districts (tambons), which are further subdivided into 96 villages (mubans). The township (thesaban tambon) Akat Amnuai covers parts of tambon Akat. There are a further eight tambon administrative organizations.

No.	Name	Thai name	Villages	Pop.
1.	Akat	อากาศ	19	8,748
2.	Phon Phaeng	โพนแพง	12	9,121
3.	Wa Yai	วาใหญ่	14	8,858
4.	Phon Ngam	โพนงาม	12	8,014
5.	Tha Kon	ท่าก้อน	8	5,436
6.	Na Hi	นาฮี	9	4,944
7.	Ba Wa	บะหว้า	12	6,303
8.	Samakkhi Phatthana	สามัคคีพัฒนา	10	8,446
