= Charoen Sin district =

Charoen Sin เจริญศิลป์
- District
- District location in Sakon Nakhon province
- Coordinates: 17°35′48″N 103°33′56″E
- Country: Thailand
- Province: Sakon Nakhon
- Seat: Charoen Sin

Area
  - Total: 401.0 km^{2} (154.8 sq mi)

Population (2005)
  - Total: 42,375
  - Density: 105.7/km^{2} (274/sq mi)
- Time zone: UTC+7 (ICT)
- Postal code: 47290
- Geocode: 4716

Charoen Sin (Thai: เจริญศิลป์, ) is a district (amphoe) of Sakon Nakhon province, northeast Thailand.

== Geography ==
Neighboring districts are (from the north clockwise) Ban Muang, Wanon Niwat and Sawang Daen Din of Sakon Nakhon Province, and Ban Dung of Udon Thani province.

== History ==
The minor district (king amphoe) Charoen Sin was established on 15 February 1988, when five tambons were split off from Sawang Daen Din district. It was upgraded to a full district on 4 July 1994.

== Administration ==
The district is divided into five sub-districts (tambons), which are further subdivided into 52 villages (mubans). The sub-district municipality (thesaban tambon) Charoen Sin covers parts of tambons Charoen Sin and Thung Kae. There are a further five tambon administrative organizations (TAO).

No.	Name	Thai name	Villages	Pop.
1.	Ban Lao	บ้านเหล่า	13	11,571
2.	Charoen Sin	เจริญศิลป์	11	10,682
3.	Thung Kae	ทุ่งแก	9	6,928
4.	Khok Sila	โคกศิลา	8	4,830
5.	Nong Paen	หนองแปน	11	8,364
