= Song Dao district =

District in Sakon Nakhon, Thailand

Song Dao ส่องดาว
- District
- District location in Sakon Nakhon province
- Coordinates: 17°20′6″N 103°27′48″E
- Country: Thailand
- Province: Sakon Nakhon
- Seat: Song Dao

Area
  - Total: 317.8 km^{2} (122.7 sq mi)

Population (2005)
  - Total: 32,439
  - Density: 102.1/km^{2} (264/sq mi)
- Time zone: UTC+7 (ICT)
- Postal code: 47190
- Geocode: 4713

Song Dao (Thai: ส่องดาว, pronounced [sɔ̀ŋ dāːw]) is a district (amphoe) in the western part of Sakon Nakhon province, northeast Thailand.

== Geography ==
Neighboring districts are (from the north clockwise) Sawang Daen Din district and Phang Khon of Sakon Nakhon Province and Chai Wan of Udon Thani province.

== History ==
As the mountainous area was originally covered with dense forests, it was a popular hideaway of robbers, who robbed travelers on the way between Kalasin and Udon Thani. At that time it was known as Song Dao Chon (ซ่องดาวโจร), which means 'den of thieves'. After the government cleaned up the area in the 19th century, it was renamed Song Dao, which means 'shining star'.

The minor district (king amphoe) Song Dao was created on 1 April 1972, when the three tambons Song Dao, Watthana, and Tha Sila were split off from Sawang Daen Din district. It was upgraded to a full district on 8 September 1976.

== Administration ==
The district is divided into four sub-districts (tambons), which are further subdivided into 46 villages (mubans). Song Dao is a township (thesaban tambon) which covers parts of tambons Song Dao and Pathum Wapi. There are a further four tambon administrative organizations (TAO).

No.	Name	Thai name	Villages	Pop.
1.	Song Dao	ส่องดาว	12	9,080
2.	Tha Sila	ท่าศิลา	13	10,379
3.	Watthana	วัฒนา	9	6,382
4.	Pathum Wapi	ปทุมวาปี	12	6,598
