= Wanon Niwat district =

Wanon Niwat วานรนิวาส
- District
- District location in Sakon Nakhon province
- Coordinates: 17°37′56″N 103°45′7″E
- Country: Thailand
- Province: Sakon Nakhon

Area
  - Total: 1,001.0 km^{2} (386.5 sq mi)

Population (2008)
  - Total: 121,097
  - Density: 119.4/km^{2} (309/sq mi)
- Time zone: UTC+7 (ICT)
- Postal code: 47120
- Geocode: 4708

Wanon Niwat (Thai: วานรนิวาส, pronounced [wāː.nɔ̄ːn ní(ʔ).wâːt]; Northeastern Thai: วานรนิวาส, pronounced [wâː.nɔ̂ːn nì(ʔ).wâːt]) is a district (amphoe) in the northern part of Sakon Nakhon province, northeast Thailand.

== Etymology ==
The name of the district means 'house of monkeys', which refers to the old name of the area, Kut Ling (กุดลิง). Ling is the Thai word for 'monkey', however in this case it is the name of a tree. Thus the old name meant 'Water which stops flowing at Ling trees'.

== Geography ==
Neighboring districts are (from the north clockwise) Ban Muang, Kham Ta Kla, Akat Amnuai, Phanna Nikhom, Phang Khon, Sawang Daen Din and Charoen Sin.

== Environment ==
Potash deposits were discovered in the area in the late-1970s. The Chinese state-owned China Ming Ta Potash Corporation, gained permission for five years to explore 120,000 rai of land in the district in 2015. Residents of the district's 82 villages are concerned about the potential environmental impacts of mining projects. Potash mining produces large quantities of salt tailings. Residents are worried that the new potash mine will cause environmental problems like high salt concentration in the soil, contamination of water sources, and soil subsidence.

== Administration ==
The district is divided into 14 sub-districts (tambons), which are further subdivided into 175 villages (mubans). Wanon Niwat is a sub-district municipality (thesaban tambon) which covers parts of tambon Wanon Niwat. There are a further 14 tambon administrative organizations (TAO).

No.	Name	Thai	Villages	Pop.
1.	Wanon Niwat	วานรนิวาส	17	17,501
2.	Duea Si Khan Chai	เดื่อศรีคันไชย	15	11,645
3.	Khua Kai	ขัวก่าย	13	8,336
4.	Nong Sanom	หนองสนม	19	13,254
5.	Khu Sakham	คูสะคาม	9	5,676
6.	That	ธาตุ	21	13,854
7.	Nong Waeng	หนองแวง	6	4,738
8.	Si Wichai	ศรีวิชัย	14	8,976
9.	Na So	นาซอ	10	6,662
10.	In Plaeng	อินทร์แปลง	9	4,132
11.	Na Kham	นาคำ	10	4,471
12.	Khon Sawan	คอนสวรรค์	9	5,204
13.	Kut Ruea Kham	กุดเรือคำ	9	6,951
14.	Nong Waeng Tai	หนองแวงใต้	14	9,697
