= Jiranun Sakultangphaisal =

Thai feminist and philanthropist (born 1965)

Dr. Jiranun Sakultangphaisal จิรนันท์ สกุลตั้งไพศาล
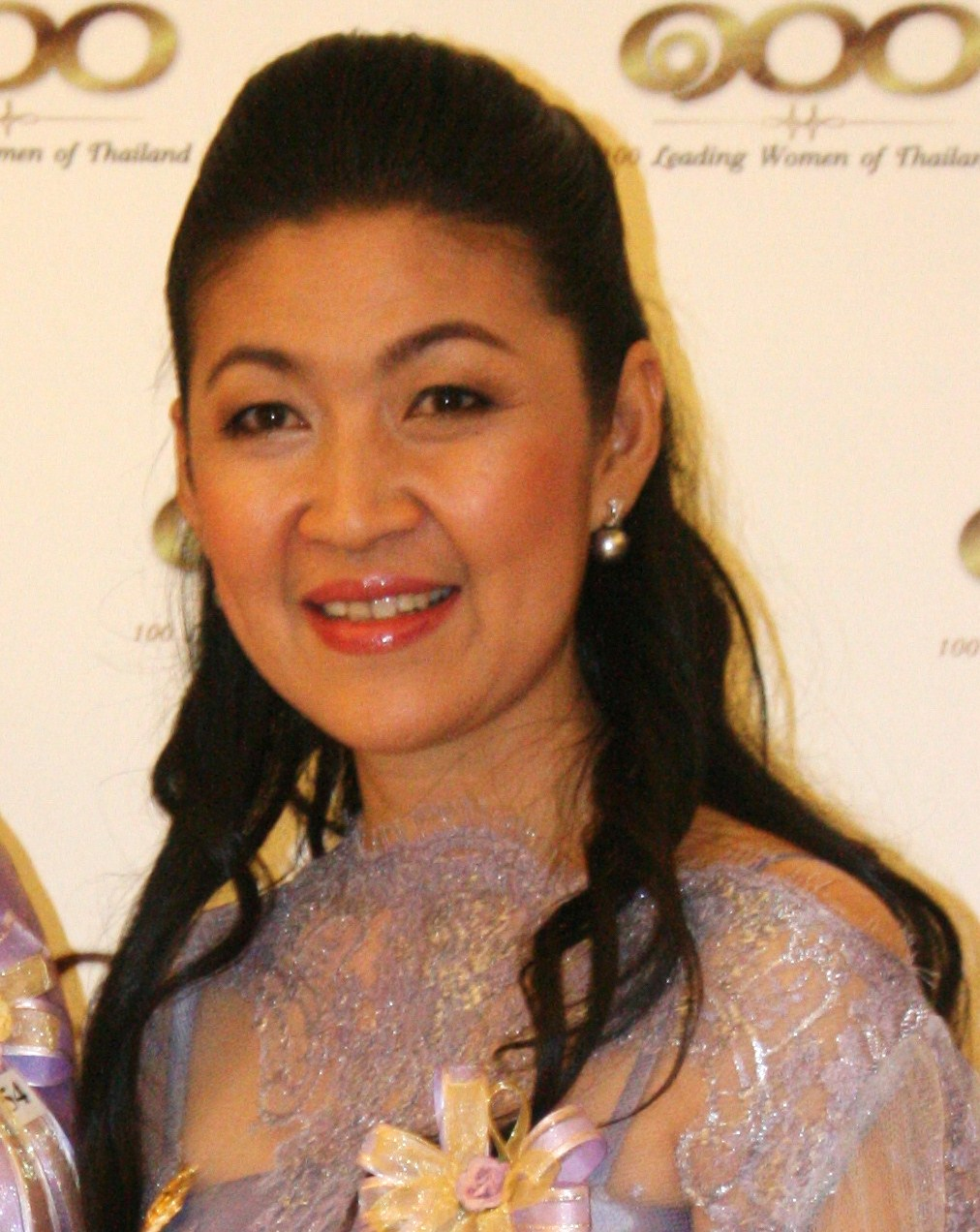
- Born: 22 December 1965 (age 60); Sakon Nakhon, Thailand
- Known for: Philanthropist, Feminist; LCI Harmony Award Winner; National Outstanding Woman
- Spouse: Boonyarit Sakultangphaisal
- Children: Supanida Sakultangphaisal; Chinnawat Sakultangphaisal

Lady Dr. Jiranun Sakultangphaisal (Thai: จิรนันท์ สกุลตั้งไพศาล, RTGS: Chiranun Sakultangpaisan, born 22 December 1965 in Sakon Nakhon, Thailand) is a Thai feminist and philanthropist, and is ranked as one of Thailand's 100 leading women. She was made Thailand's National Outstanding Woman in 2015, and a National Exemplary Mother in 2016.

She currently serves as an executive in the Thai government's leading Public-private partnership project, the Pracharat programme.

== Personal life ==
Jiranun married Boonyarit Sakultangphaisal. The couple has two children – Supanida Sakultangphaisal and Chinnawat Sakultangphaisal. Together with philanthropy, Jiranun also has deep interests in Thai literature, Thai culture, and culinary art.

== Social work ==
Lady Sakultangphaisal is a philanthropist and a feminist. Currently, she is a Chairman of the Catholic Commissions for Women, Head of the Women Promotion Division of Zonta International Club, Bangkok, and a Chair of the National Catholic Commissions for Social Development. Her work with these NGOs involves reducing problems associated with materialism in girls and prostitution.

Jiranun currently holds a number of posts in the government body and public sector, most of which are related to community development. In many interviews, she emphasizes the importance of sustainable development, strong families and communities, in reducing social problems and poverty.

Apart from her community work, she is also a board of directors of the Bangkok Opera (Bangkok Opera Foundation under the Royal Patronage of Princess Galyani Vadhana). She sits in the Khon Kaen University Campus Council as an advisor to the Faculty of Integrated Social Science.

== Awards and recognition ==
In December 1999, the Lions Club International 310E committee presented her with the Harmony Award for "her outstanding work to help others in need".

In October 2008, Jiranun was made one of the 100 Leading Women of Thailand, where she received an honorary award from Princess Soamsavali of Thailand, at the same time as Khunying Kalaya Sophonpanich, the then Minister of Science and Technology.

In 2009, Jiranun received the Woman Development Award for her contributions in advancing women's status in Thailand.

In 2013, Jiranun received a royal decoration, the Red Cross Awards Medal, for her services to the Thai Red Cross Society, from Princess Sirindhorn.

In 2015, on the recommendation of the Ministry of Social Development and Human Security and the National Council of Women of Thailand, under Royal Patronage, Jiranun received Thailand's National Outstanding Woman Award from Queen Sirikit of Thailand.
