= Kut Bak district =

Kut Bak กุดบาก
- District
- District location in Sakon Nakhon province
- Coordinates: 17°5′14″N 103°49′21″E
- Country: Thailand
- Province: Sakon Nakhon
- Seat: Kut Bak
- District established: 1

Area
  - Total: 455.0 km^{2} (175.7 sq mi)

Population (2005)
  - Total: 31,833
  - Density: 70/km^{2} (180/sq mi)
- Time zone: UTC+7 (ICT)
- Postal code: 47180
- Geocode: 4703

Kut Bak (Thai: กุดบาก, pronounced [kùt bàːk]) is a district (amphoe) of Sakon Nakhon province, Thailand.

== Geography ==
Neighboring districts are (from the north clockwise) Nikhom Nam Un, Phanna Nikhom, Mueang Sakon Nakhon, and Phu Phan of Sakon Nakhon Province, Kham Muang of Kalasin province and Wang Sam Mo of Udon Thani province.

== History ==
The minor district (king amphoe) was created on 1 February 1964, when three tambons, Kut Bak, Khok Phu, and Na Mong were split from Mueang Sakon Nakhon district. It was upgraded to a full district on 14 November 1967.

== Administration ==
The district is divided into three sub-districts (tambons), which are further subdivided into 38 villages (mubans). Kut Bak is a township (thesaban tambon) which covers parts of tambon Kut Bak. There are a further three tambon administrative organizations (TAO).

No.	Name	Thai name	Villages	Pop.
1.	Kut Bak	กุดบาก	10	10,687
3.	Na Mong	นาม่อง	17	11,918
5.	Kut Hai	กุดไห	11	9,228

Missing numbers are tambons which now form Phu Phan District.
