= Sakon Nakhon =

Sakon Nakhon สกลนคร
- City Municipality
- City of Sakon Nakhon เทศบาลนครสกลนคร
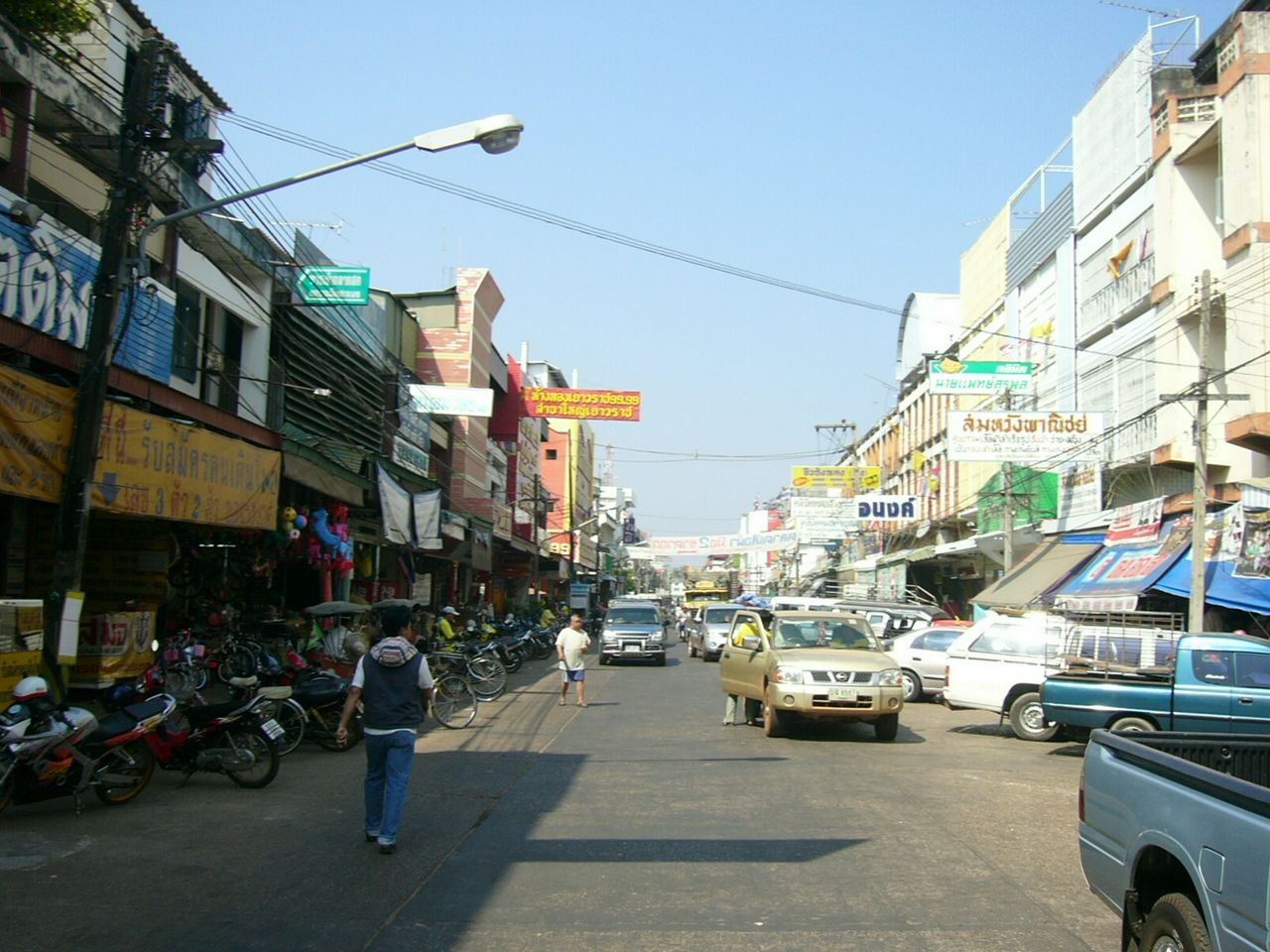
- A street in Sakon Nakhon

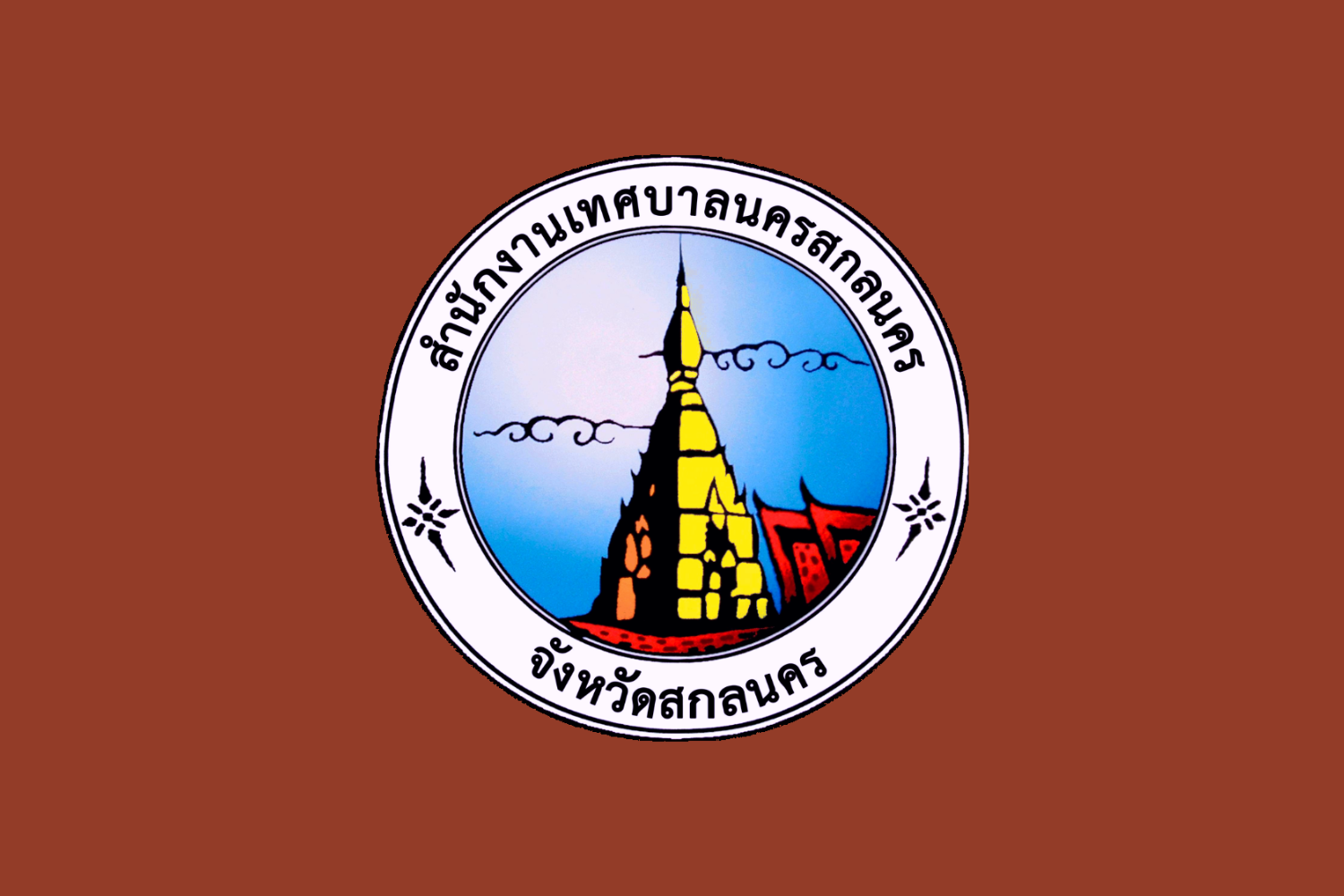
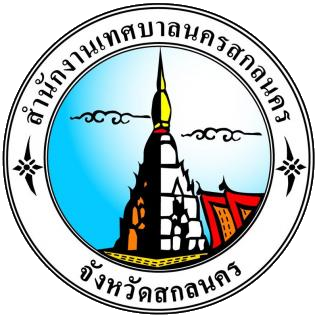
- Flag Seal

- Location in Thailand
- Coordinates: 17°9′23″N 104°8′44″E
- Country: Thailand
- Province: Sakon Nakhon
- District: Mueang Sakon Nakhon

Government
  - Type: City Municipality
  - Mayor: Komut Teekathananond

Area
  - Total: 54.54 km^{2} (21.06 sq mi)
- Elevation: 175 m (574 ft)

Population
  - Total: 76,000
  - Density: 1,400/km^{2} (3,600/sq mi)
- Time zone: UTC+7 (ICT)
- Area code: (+66) 42
- Climate: Aw
- Website: sakoncity.go.th

Sakon Nakhon (Thai: สกลนคร, pronounced [sā.kōn ná(ʔ).kʰɔ̄ːn]) is a city (thesaban nakhon) in Thailand within the Isan region, and capital city of Sakon Nakhon Province as well as Mueang Sakon Nakhon District, with a population of approximately 76,000. Sakon Nakhon covers the whole tambon of That Choeng Chum and parts of tambons Ngio Don, Huai Yang, Dong Mafai, That Na Weng and Hang Hong. Sakon Nakhon is 651 km (405 mi) north-east of Bangkok by road.

== History ==
During World War II, Sakon Nakhon became a haven for Free Thais, and a base for Communist activities in the late 1950s.

== Geography ==
Sakon Nakhon lies on a flat plain at about 175 metres (574 ft) elevation on the south-west bank of Lake Nong Han, the largest lake of north-east Thailand. The town is surrounded by extensive farmland.

== Climate ==
Sakon Nakhon has a tropical savanna climate (Köppen climate classification Aw). Winters are dry and very warm. Temperatures rise until April, which is hot with the average daily maximum at 35.2 °C (95.4 °F). The monsoon season runs from May through October, with heavy rain and somewhat cooler temperatures during the day, although nights remain warm. The highest temperature of 42.5 °C (108.5 °F) was recorded on 12, 15 and 17 April 2016. While the lowest temperature of 0.5 °C (32.9 °F) was recorded on 12 January 1955.

Climate data for Sakon Nakhon (1991–2020, extremes 1952-present)
Month	Jan	Feb	Mar	Apr	May	Jun	Jul	Aug	Sep	Oct	Nov	Dec	Year
Record high °C (°F)	36.2 (97.2)	38.8 (101.8)	41.0 (105.8)	43.4 (110.1)	42.3 (108.1)	40.0 (104.0)	39.4 (102.9)	36.0 (96.8)	35.7 (96.3)	35.1 (95.2)	36.6 (97.9)	35.3 (95.5)	43.4 (110.1)
Mean daily maximum °C (°F)	29.3 (84.7)	31.4 (88.5)	33.9 (93.0)	35.2 (95.4)	33.9 (93.0)	32.8 (91.0)	32.0 (89.6)	31.5 (88.7)	31.6 (88.9)	31.5 (88.7)	30.8 (87.4)	29.1 (84.4)	31.9 (89.4)
Daily mean °C (°F)	22.5 (72.5)	24.4 (75.9)	27.5 (81.5)	29.2 (84.6)	28.7 (83.7)	28.4 (83.1)	27.8 (82.0)	27.5 (81.5)	27.4 (81.3)	26.6 (79.9)	24.9 (76.8)	22.5 (72.5)	26.5 (79.6)
Mean daily minimum °C (°F)	16.8 (62.2)	18.9 (66.0)	22.4 (72.3)	24.7 (76.5)	25.2 (77.4)	25.4 (77.7)	25.1 (77.2)	24.8 (76.6)	24.4 (75.9)	22.8 (73.0)	20.0 (68.0)	17.1 (62.8)	22.3 (72.1)
Record low °C (°F)	0.5 (32.9)	7.6 (45.7)	7.5 (45.5)	15.0 (59.0)	16.5 (61.7)	19.4 (66.9)	20.5 (68.9)	21.7 (71.1)	20.0 (68.0)	14.2 (57.6)	6.9 (44.4)	4.0 (39.2)	0.5 (32.9)
Average precipitation mm (inches)	6.1 (0.24)	27.4 (1.08)	56.3 (2.22)	92.4 (3.64)	232.4 (9.15)	262.1 (10.32)	337.7 (13.30)	324.8 (12.79)	233.0 (9.17)	65.6 (2.58)	13.5 (0.53)	6.9 (0.27)	1,658.2 (65.28)
Average precipitation days (≥ 1.0 mm)	1.0	2.2	4.5	6.6	14.4	15.9	18.4	20.3	14.0	5.3	1.5	0.5	104.6
Average relative humidity (%)	66.7	64.5	63.3	66.1	76.0	80.0	82.2	84.2	83.0	75.6	70.2	68.0	73.3
Mean monthly sunshine hours	260.7	245.8	249.6	244.9	204.3	163.1	145.0	141.0	166.9	231.6	241.2	249.1	2,543.2
Mean daily sunshine hours	8.8	8.6	8.9	8.1	6.4	5.2	3.9	3.8	6.1	7.6	8.4	8.8	7.0
Source 1: World Meteorological Organization
Source 2: Office of Water Management and Hydrology, Royal Irrigation Department (daily sun 1981–2010)(extremes)

== Economy ==
Fish and rice are two of the major products of the region.

== Transportation ==
Route 22 leads west to Udon Thani, 160 kilometres (99 mi) distant, and east to Nakhon Phanom (91 kilometres (57 mi)) and the border with Laos. Route 223 leads south to That Phanom (76 kilometres (47 mi)). Route 213 leads southwest to Kalasin (131 kilometres (81 mi)).

There is a regional airport, Sakon Nakhon Airport, on the north side of the city.

== Notable people ==
Notable people born in Sakon Nakthon, and notable residents and ex-residents include:

- Jiranun Sakultangphaisal (born 1965 in Sakon Nakthon), philanthropist
