= Sahatsakhan district =

District of Thailand

Sahatsakhan สหัสขันธ์
- District
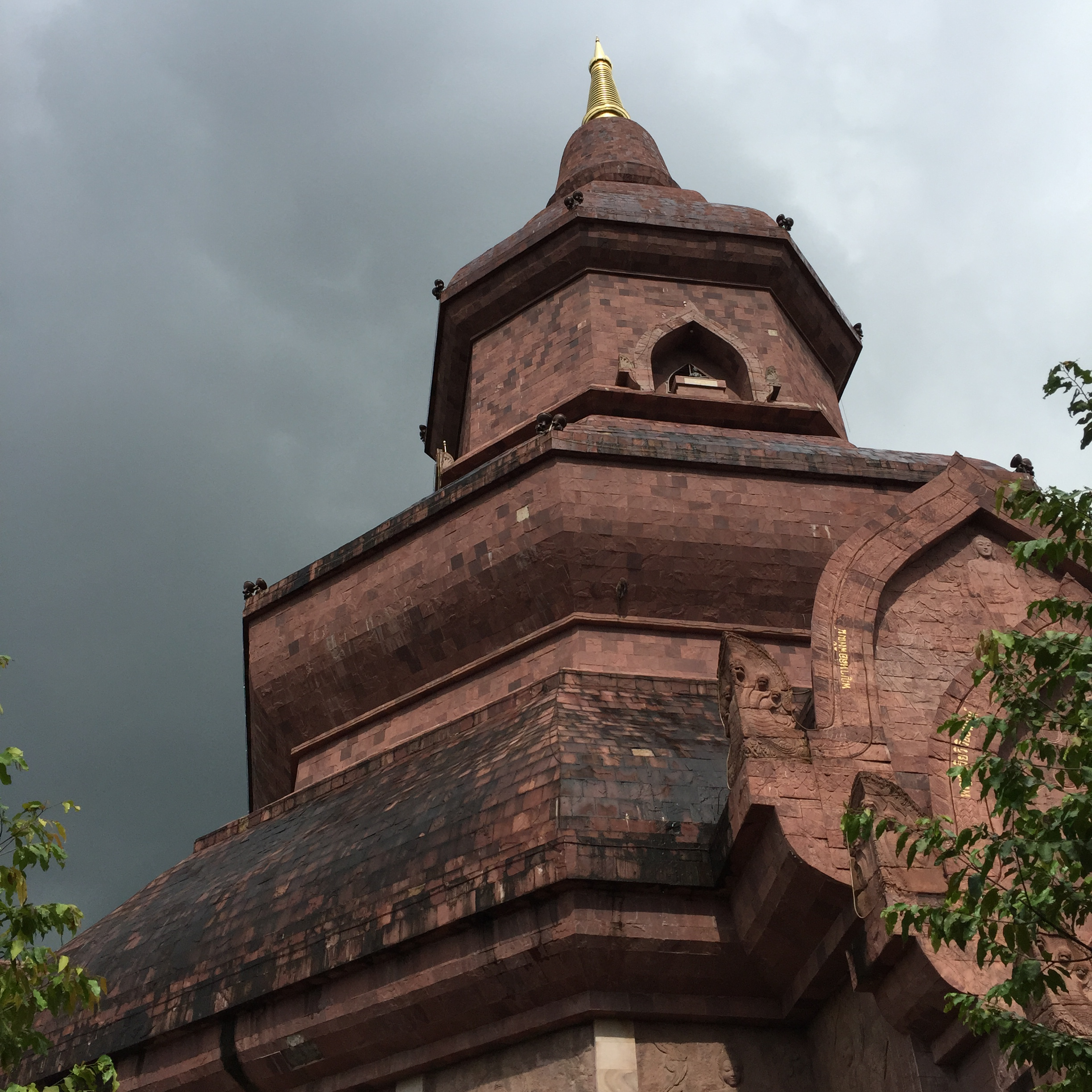

- District location in Kalasin province
- Coordinates: 16°42′48″N 103°31′12″E
- Country: Thailand
- Province: Kalasin

Area
  - Total: 316.402 km^{2} (122.163 sq mi)

Population (2005)
  - Total: 41,536
  - Density: 131.3/km^{2} (340/sq mi)
- Time zone: UTC+7 (ICT)
- Postal code: 46140
- Geocode: 4609

Sahatsakhan (Thai: สหัสขันธ์, pronounced [sā.hàt.sā.kʰǎn]) is a district (amphoe) in the central part of Kalasin province, northeastern Thailand.

== Geography ==
Neighboring districts are (from the east clockwise): Somdet, Mueang Kalasin, Nong Kung Si, Sam Chai, and Kham Muang of Kalasin Province.

== Administration ==
The district is divided into eight sub-districts (tambons), which are further subdivided into 85 villages (mubans). Non Buri is a township (thesaban tambon) which covers parts of tambon Non Buri. There are a further seven tambon administrative organizations (TAO).

No.	Name	Thai name	Villages	Pop.
1.	Phu Sing	ภูสิงห์	9	2,593
2.	Sahatsakhan	สหัสขันธ์	13	6,432
3.	Na Makhuea	นามะเขือ	12	7,572
4.	Non Sila	โนนศิลา	13	8,051
5.	Nikhom	นิคม	7	3,020
6.	Non Laem Thong	โนนแหลมทอง	12	5,291
7.	Non Buri	โนนบุรี	11	5,351
8.	Non Nam Kliang	โนนน้ำเกลี้ยง	8	3,226
