= Sawang Daen Din district =

Sawang Daen Din สว่างแดนดิน
- District
- District location in Sakon Nakhon province
- Coordinates: 17°28′30″N 103°27′30″E
- Country: Thailand
- Province: Sakon Nakhon
- Seat: Sawang Daen Din
- Tambon: 16
- Muban: 189

Area
  - Total: 970.0 km^{2} (374.5 sq mi)

Population (2015)
  - Total: 150,786
  - Density: 151.4/km^{2} (392/sq mi)
- Time zone: UTC+7 (ICT)
- Postal code: 47110
- Geocode: 4712

Sawang Daen Din (Thai: สว่างแดนดิน, pronounced [sā.wàːŋ dɛ̄ːn dīn]; Northeastern Thai: สว่างแดนดิน, pronounced [sā.wāːŋ dɛ̀ːn dìn]) is a district (amphoe) in the western part of Sakon Nakhon province, northeast Thailand.

== Geography ==
Neighbouring districts are (from the north clockwise) Charoen Sin, Wanon Niwat, Phang Khon, Waritchaphum, and Song Dao of Sakon Nakhon Province, Chai Wan, Nong Han, Thung Fon, and Ban Dung of Udon Thani province.

== History ==
The district dates back to Mueang Sawang Daen Din, which was converted into an amphoe during the Thesaphiban administrative reforms around 1900.

In 1939 it was renamed Sawang Daen Din.

== Administration ==
=== Central administration ===
Sawang Daen Din is divided into 16 sub-districts (tambons), which are further subdivided into 189 administrative villages (mubans).

No.	Name	Thai	Villages	Pop.
1.	Sawang Daen Din	สว่างแดนดิน	27	30,273
3.	Kham Sa-at	คำสะอาด	14	10,933
4.	Ban Tai	บ้านต้าย	7	6,451
6.	Bong Nuea	บงเหนือ	12	10,759
7.	Phon Sung	โพนสูง	9	6,088
8.	Khok Si	โคกสี	14	11,392
10.	Nong Luang	หนองหลวง	12	8,225
11.	Bong Tai	บงใต้	15	10,087
12.	Kho Tai	ค้อใต้	10	6,782
13.	Phan Na	พันนา	12	6,893
14.	Waeng	แวง	11	10,632
15.	Sai Mun	ทรายมูล	8	7,069
16.	Tan Kon	ตาลโกน	11	6,056
17.	Tan Noeng	ตาลเนิ้ง	9	4,941
20.	That Thong	ธาตุทอง	8	5,875
21.	Ban Thon	บ้านถ่อน	10	8,330

Missing numbers are tambon which now form Charoen Sin District.

=== Local administration ===
There are seven sub-district municipalities (thesaban tambons) in the district:

- Don Khueang (Thai: เทศบาลตำบลดอนเขือง) consisting of parts of sub-district Waeng.
- Sawang Daen Din (Thai: เทศบาลตำบลสว่างแดนดิน) consisting of parts of sub-district Sawang Daen Din.
- Bong Tai (Thai: เทศบาลตำบลบงใต้) consisting of sub-district Bong Tai.
- Ban Tai (Thai: เทศบาลตำบลบ้านต้าย) consisting of sub-district Ban Tai.
- Khok Si (Thai: เทศบาลตำบลโคกสี) consisting of sub-district Khok Si.
- Nong Luang (Thai: เทศบาลตำบลหนองหลวง) consisting of sub-district Nong Luang.
- Phan Na (Thai: เทศบาลตำบลพันนา) consisting of sub-district Phan Na.

There are 11 subdistrict administrative organizations (SAO) in the district:

- Sawang Daen Din (Thai: องค์การบริหารส่วนตำบลสว่างแดนดิน) consisting of parts of sub-district Sawang Daen Din.
- Kham Sa-at (Thai: องค์การบริหารส่วนตำบลคำสะอาด) consisting of sub-district Kham Sa-at.
- Bong Nuea (Thai: องค์การบริหารส่วนตำบลบงเหนือ) consisting of sub-district Bong Nuea.
- Phon Sung (Thai: องค์การบริหารส่วนตำบลโพนสูง) consisting of sub-district Phon Sung.
- Kho Tai (Thai: องค์การบริหารส่วนตำบลค้อใต้) consisting of sub-district Kho Tai.
- Waeng (Thai: องค์การบริหารส่วนตำบลแวง) consisting of parts of the sub-district Waeng.
- Sai Mun (Thai: องค์การบริหารส่วนตำบลทรายมูล) consisting of sub-district Sai Mun.
- Tan Kon (Thai: องค์การบริหารส่วนตำบลตาลโกน) consisting of sub-district Tan Kon.
- Tan Noeng (Thai: องค์การบริหารส่วนตำบลตาลเนิ้ง) consisting of sub-district Tan Noeng.
- That Thong (Thai: องค์การบริหารส่วนตำบลธาตุทอง) consisting of sub-district That Thong.
- Ban Thon (Thai: องค์การบริหารส่วนตำบลบ้านถ่อน) consisting of sub-district Ban Thon.
