= Chao Phraya Yommarat Hospital =

Hospital in Suphan Buri, Thailand

Chao Phraya Yommarat Hospital โรงพยาบาลเจ้าพระยายมราช
- The Ministry of Public Health Health District 5

Geography
- Location: 950 Phra Phan Wasa Road, Tha Phi Liang Subdistrict, Mueang Suphan Buri District, Suphan Buri 72000, Thailand
- Coordinates: 14.466624°N 100.116075°E

Organisation
- Type: Regional
- Affiliated university: Faculty of Medicine, Kasetsart University; Faculty of Medicine Ramathibodi Hospital, Mahidol University

Services
- Beds: 738

History
- Opened: 29 November 1926

Links
- Website: yrh.moph.go.th/wordpress2/
- Lists: Hospitals in Thailand

Chao Phraya Yommarat Hospital (Thai: โรงพยาบาลเจ้าพระยายมราช) is the main hospital of Suphan Buri Province, Thailand and is classified under the Ministry of Public Health as a regional hospital. It is an affiliated hospital of the Faculty of Medicine Ramathibodi Hospital, Mahidol University. It became a main teaching hospital for the Faculty of Medicine, Kasetsart University since 2024.

== History ==
Chao Phraya Yommarat Hospital was built in 1926 by money donated by Chao Phraya Yommarat (Pan Sukhum), regent to the King of Thailand as a two-storey concrete building, overlooking the Tha Chin River. In 1942, the hospital became a provincial hospital, became managed by the Ministry of Public Health. An ER unit was added in 1991.

The hospital became classified as a regional hospital in 2001, then with 503 beds and has since expanded to 738 beds as of 2024.

== See also ==
- Healthcare in Thailand
- Hospitals in Thailand
- List of hospitals in Thailand
