= Ban Muang district =

Ban Muang บ้านม่วง
- District
- District location in Sakon Nakhon province
- Coordinates: 17°51′4″N 103°34′12″E
- Country: Thailand
- Province: Sakon Nakhon
- Seat: Muang

Area
  - Total: 850.0 km^{2} (328.2 sq mi)

Population (2005)
  - Total: 67,196
  - Density: 79.1/km^{2} (205/sq mi)
- Time zone: UTC+7 (ICT)
- Postal code: 47140
- Geocode: 4710

Ban Muang (Thai: บ้านม่วง, pronounced [bâːn mûa̯ŋ]) is a district (amphoe) of Sakon Nakhon province, northeast Thailand.

== Geography ==
Neighboring districts are (from the west clockwise) Ban Dung of Udon Thani province, Fao Rai of Nong Khai province, So Phisai and Phon Charoen of Bueng Kan province, Kham Ta Kla, Wanon Niwat and Charoen Sin of Sakon Nakhon Province.

The Songkhram River marks the boundary of the district to the west.

== History ==
The minor district (king amphoe) was created on 20 March 1968, when the three tambons Mai, Muang, and Dong Mo Thong were split off from Wanon Niwat district. It was upgraded to a full district on 16 November 1971.

== Administration ==
The district is divided into nine sub-districts (tambons), which are further subdivided into 92 villages (mubans). The sub-district municipality (thesaban tambon) Ban Muang covers parts of tambon Muang. There are a further nine tambon administrative organizations (TAO).

No.	Name	Thai name	Villages	Pop.
1.	Muang	ม่วง	11	8,205
2.	Mai	มาย	9	5,974
3.	Dong Mo Thong	ดงหม้อทอง	11	7,083
4.	Dong Nuea	ดงเหนือ	12	7,125
5.	Dong Mo Thong Tai	ดงหม้อทองใต้	9	8,174
6.	Huai Lua	ห้วยหลัว	9	7,192
7.	Non Sa-at	โนนสะอาด	9	5,321
8.	Nong Kwang	หนองกวั่ง	11	9,118
9.	Bo Kaeo	บ่อแก้ว	11	9,004
