= Phanna Nikhom district =

Phanna Nikhom พรรณานิคม
- District
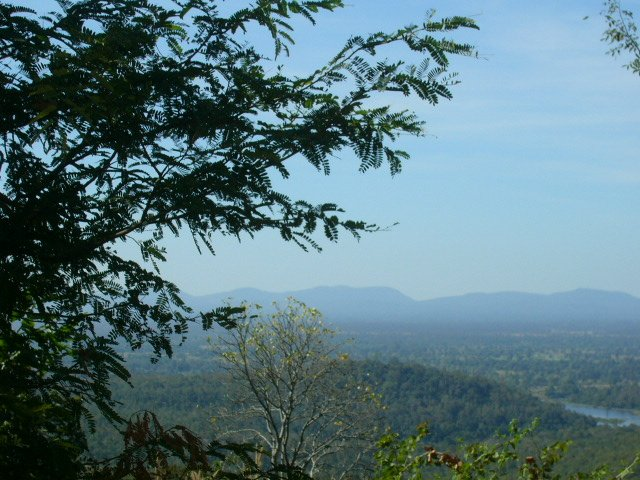
- View from Wat Tham Kham

- District location in Sakon Nakhon province
- Coordinates: 17°21′6″N 103°50′48″E
- Country: Thailand
- Province: Sakon Nakhon

Area
  - Total: 673.798 km^{2} (260.155 sq mi)

Population (2005)
  - Total: 79,507
  - Density: 118/km^{2} (310/sq mi)
- Time zone: UTC+7 (ICT)
- Postal code: 47130
- Geocode: 4704

Phanna Nikhom (Thai: พรรณานิคม, pronounced [pʰān.nāː ní(ʔ).kʰōm]; Northeastern Thai: พรรณานิคม, pronounced [pʰân.nâː nì(ʔ).kʰôm]) is a district (amphoe) of Sakon Nakhon province, Thailand.

== Geography ==
Neighboring districts are (from the east clockwise) Mueang Sakon Nakhon, Kut Bak, Nikhom Nam Un, Waritchaphum, Phang Khon, Wanon Niwat and Akat Amnuai of Sakon Nakhon Province, and Na Wa of Nakhon Phanom province.

== History ==
The area was originally known as Ban Phang Phrao (บ้านพังพร้าว). It was renamed Phanna Nikhom and made a district in 1902.

== Administration ==
The district is divided into 10 sub-districts (tambons), which are further subdivided into 123 villages (mubans). Phanna Nikhom is a township (thesaban tambon) which covers parts of tambon Phanna. There are a further 10 tambon administrative organizations (TAO).

| No. | Name | Thai name | Villages | Pop. |
|---|---|---|---|---|
| 1. | Phanna | พรรณา | 11 | 8,636 |
| 2. | Wang Yang | วังยาง | 10 | 8,044 |
| 3. | Phok Noi | พอกน้อย | 11 | 8,737 |
| 4. | Na Hua Bo | นาหัวบ่อ | 15 | 10,232 |
| 5. | Rai | ไร่ | 15 | 9,268 |
| 6. | Chang Ming | ช้างมิ่ง | 18 | 9,112 |
| 7. | Na Nai | นาใน | 11 | 7,385 |
| 8. | Sawang | สว่าง | 12 | 6,962 |
| 9. | Ba Hi | บะฮี | 10 | 6,152 |
| 10. | Choeng Chum | เชิงชุม | 10 | 4,979 |
