= Phu Phan district =

Phu Phan ภูพาน
- District
- District location in Sakon Nakhon province
- Coordinates: 17°0′0″N 103°57′56″E
- Country: Thailand
- Province: Sakon Nakhon
- Seat: Khok Phu

Area
  - Total: 559.0 km^{2} (215.8 sq mi)

Population (2005)
  - Total: 36,050
  - Density: 64.5/km^{2} (167/sq mi)
- Time zone: UTC+7 (ICT)
- Postal code: 47180
- Geocode: 4718

Phu Phan (Thai: ภูพาน, pronounced [pʰūː pʰāːn]) is a district (amphoe) of Sakon Nakhon province, northeast Thailand.

== History ==
The minor district (king amphoe) was created on 30 April 1994, when three tambons Sang Kho, Lup Lao, and Khok Phu were split off from Kut Bak district. The tambon Kok Pla Sio was added from Mueang Sakon Nakhon district in 1996. On 11 October 1997 it was upgraded to a full district.

== Geography ==
Neighboring districts are (from the north clockwise) Kut Bak, Mueang Sakon Nakhon and Tao Ngoi of Sakon Nakhon Province, Na Khu, Huai Phueng, Somdet and Kham Muang of Kalasin province.

== Administration ==
The district is divided into four sub-districts (tambons), which are further subdivided into 61 villages (mubans). There are no municipal (thesaban) areas, and a further four tambon administrative organizations (TAO).

No.	Name	Thai name	Villages	Pop.
1.	Sang Kho	สร้างค้อ	22	11,069
2.	Lup Lao	หลุบเลา	12	7,021
3.	Khok Phu	โคกภู	18	14,248
4.	Kok Pla Sio	กกปลาซิว	9	3,712
