= Phang Khon district =

Phang Khon พังโคน
- District
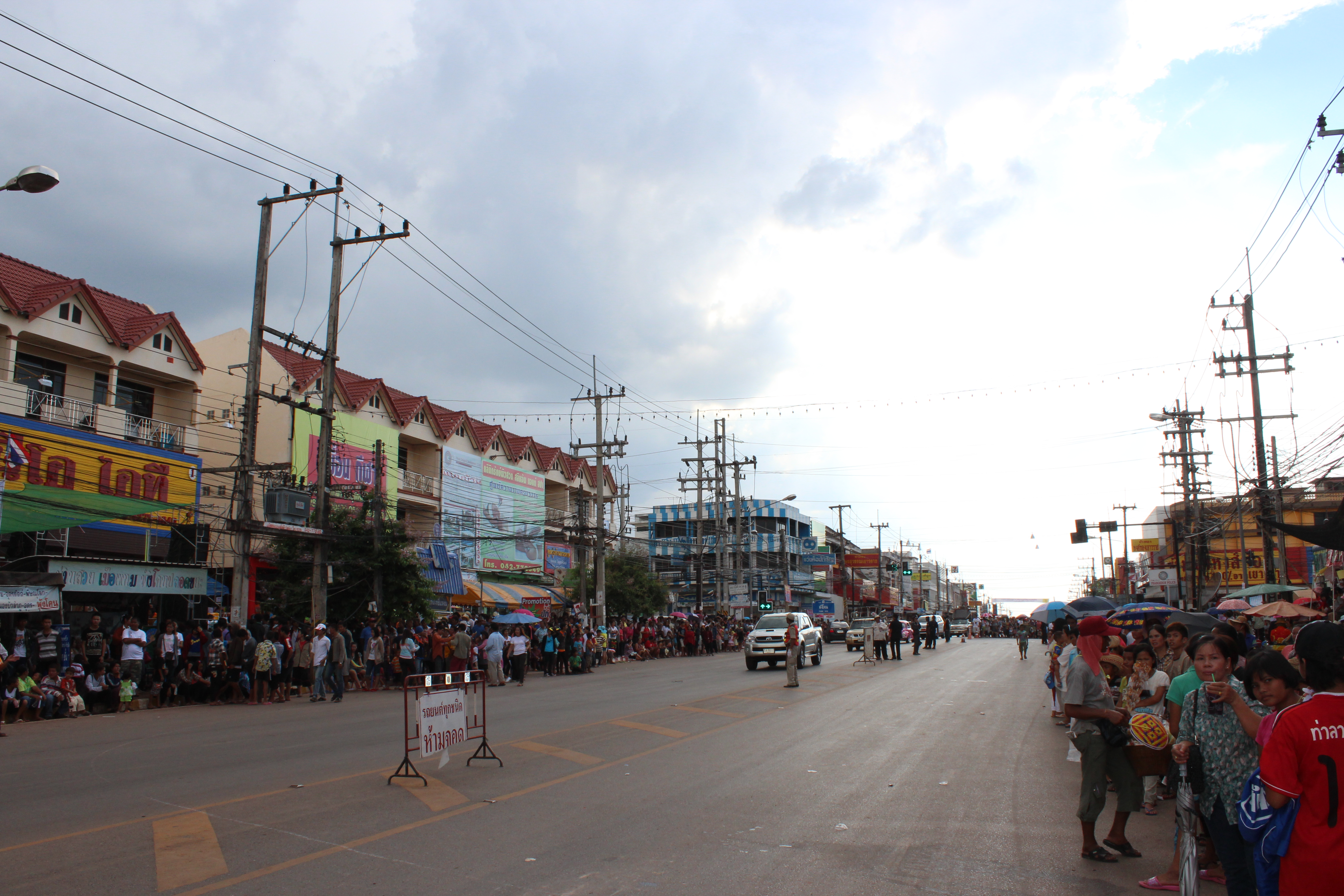
- Main street at Phang Khon village

- District location in Sakon Nakhon province
- Coordinates: 17°23′33″N 103°42′34″E
- Country: Thailand
- Province: Sakon Nakhon
- Seat: Phang Khon

Area
  - Total: 383.8 km^{2} (148.2 sq mi)

Population (2005)
  - Total: 52,031
  - Density: 135.6/km^{2} (351/sq mi)
- Time zone: UTC+7 (ICT)
- Postal code: 47160
- Geocode: 4705

Phang Khon (Thai: พังโคน, pronounced [pʰāŋ kʰōːn]; Northeastern Thai: พังโคน, pronounced [pʰâŋ kʰôːn]) is a district (amphoe) of Sakon Nakhon province, Thailand.

== Geography ==
Neighboring districts are (from the north clockwise): Wanon Niwat, Phanna Nikhom, Waritchaphum and Sawang Daen Din.

The Nam Un Dam is in the district.

== History ==
The minor district (king amphoe) was created on 20 March 1968, when the three tambons Muang Khai, Hai Yong, and Rae were split off from Phanna Nikhom district. It was upgraded to a full district on 16 November 1971.

== Religion ==
Christianity represents 70% of the population, Buddhism represents 30% of the population.

== Administration ==
The district is divided into five sub-districts (tambons), which are further subdivided into 70 villages (mubans). Phang Khon is a township (thesaban tambon) which covers parts of tambon Phang Khon. There are a further five tambon administrative organizations (TAO).

No.	Name	Thai name	Villages	Pop.
1.	Phang Khon	พังโคน	13	13,621
2.	Muang Khai	ม่วงไข่	11	9,366
3.	Rae	แร่	14	8,192
4.	Hai Yong	ไฮหย่อง	18	12,700
5.	Ton Phueng	ต้นผึ้ง	14	8,152
