= Sakon Nakhon province =

Province of Thailand

Coordinates: 17°9′15″N 104°8′10″E

Sakon Nakhon สกลนคร
- Province
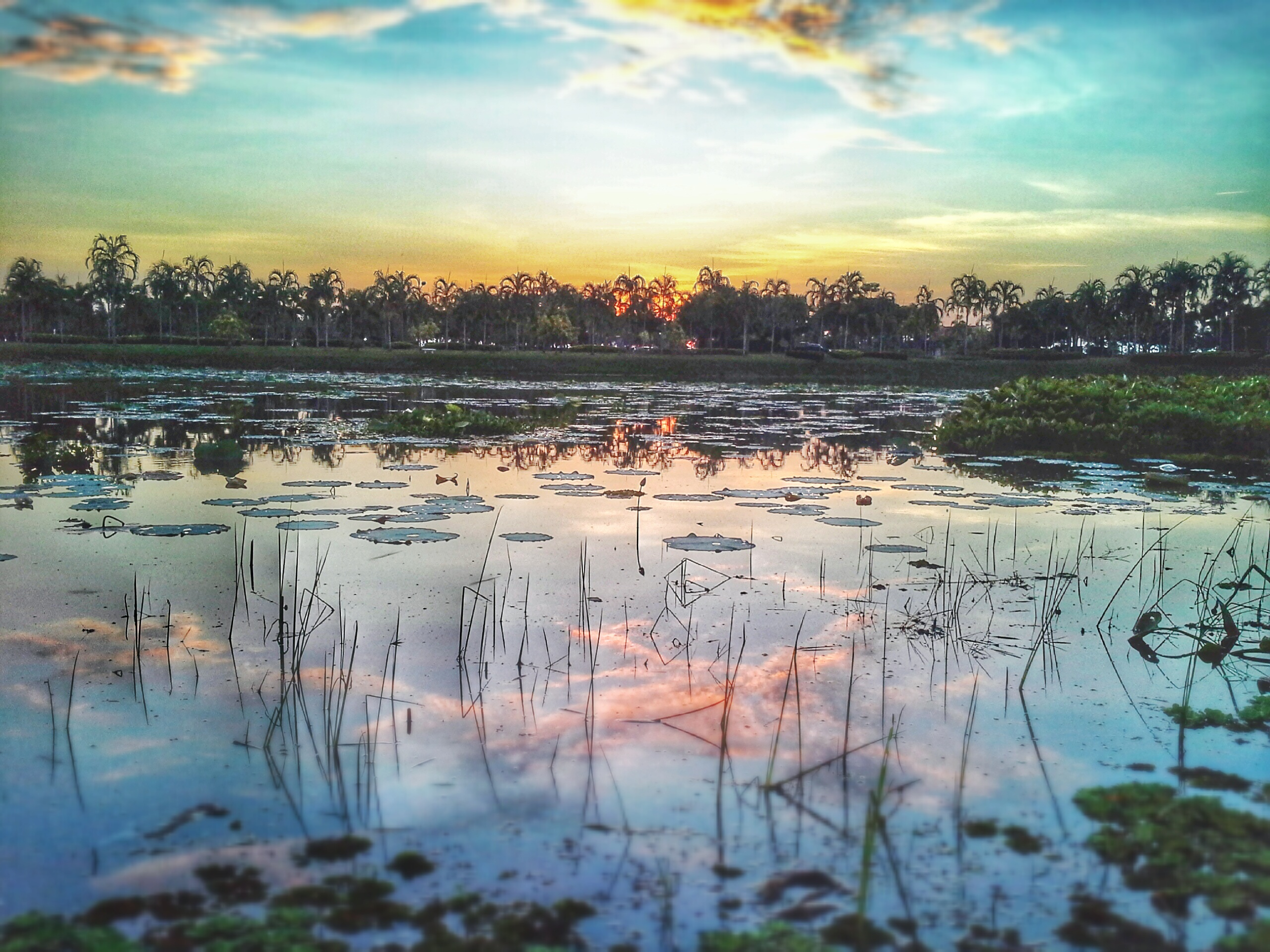
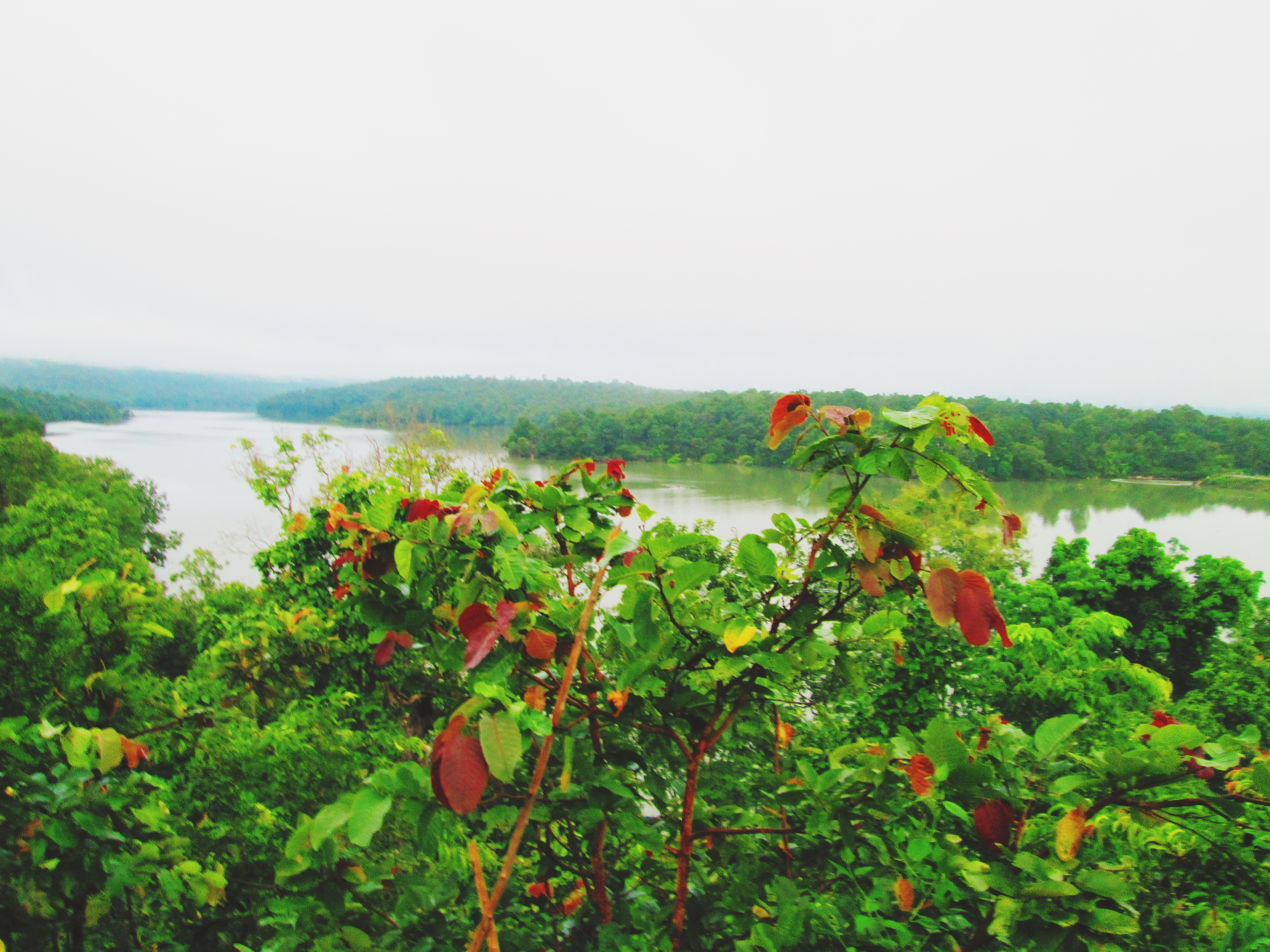
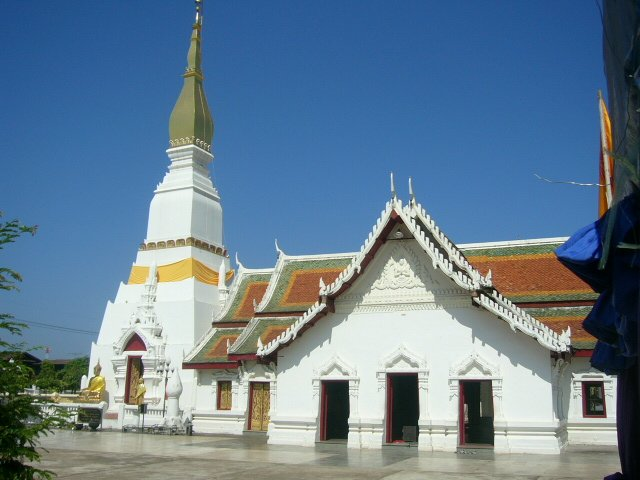
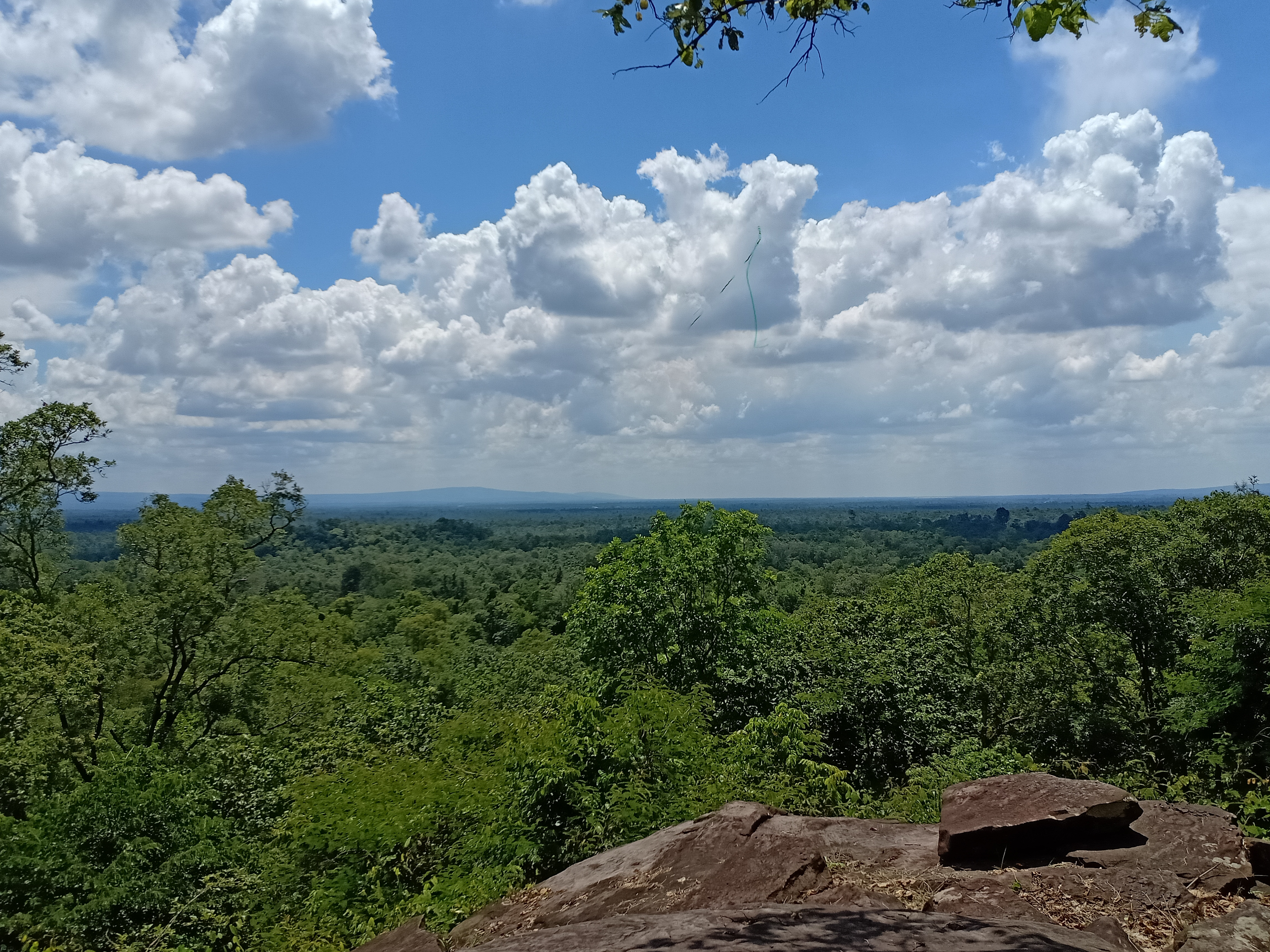
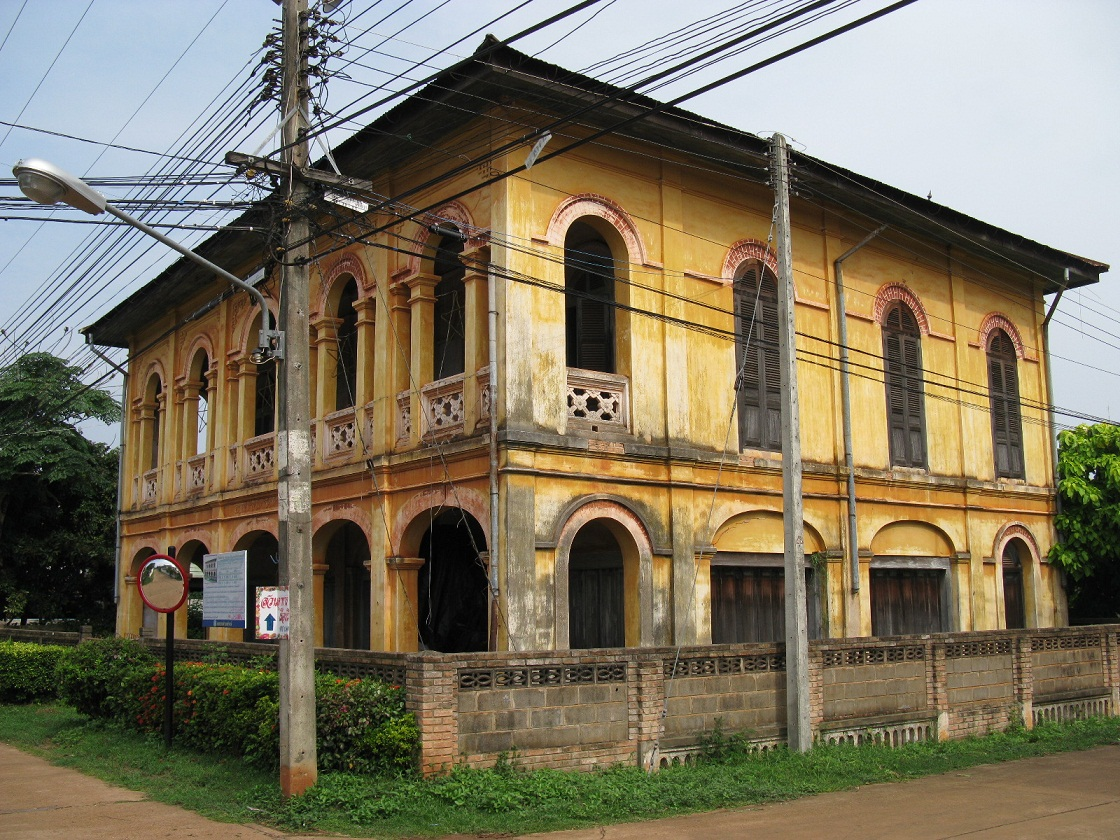
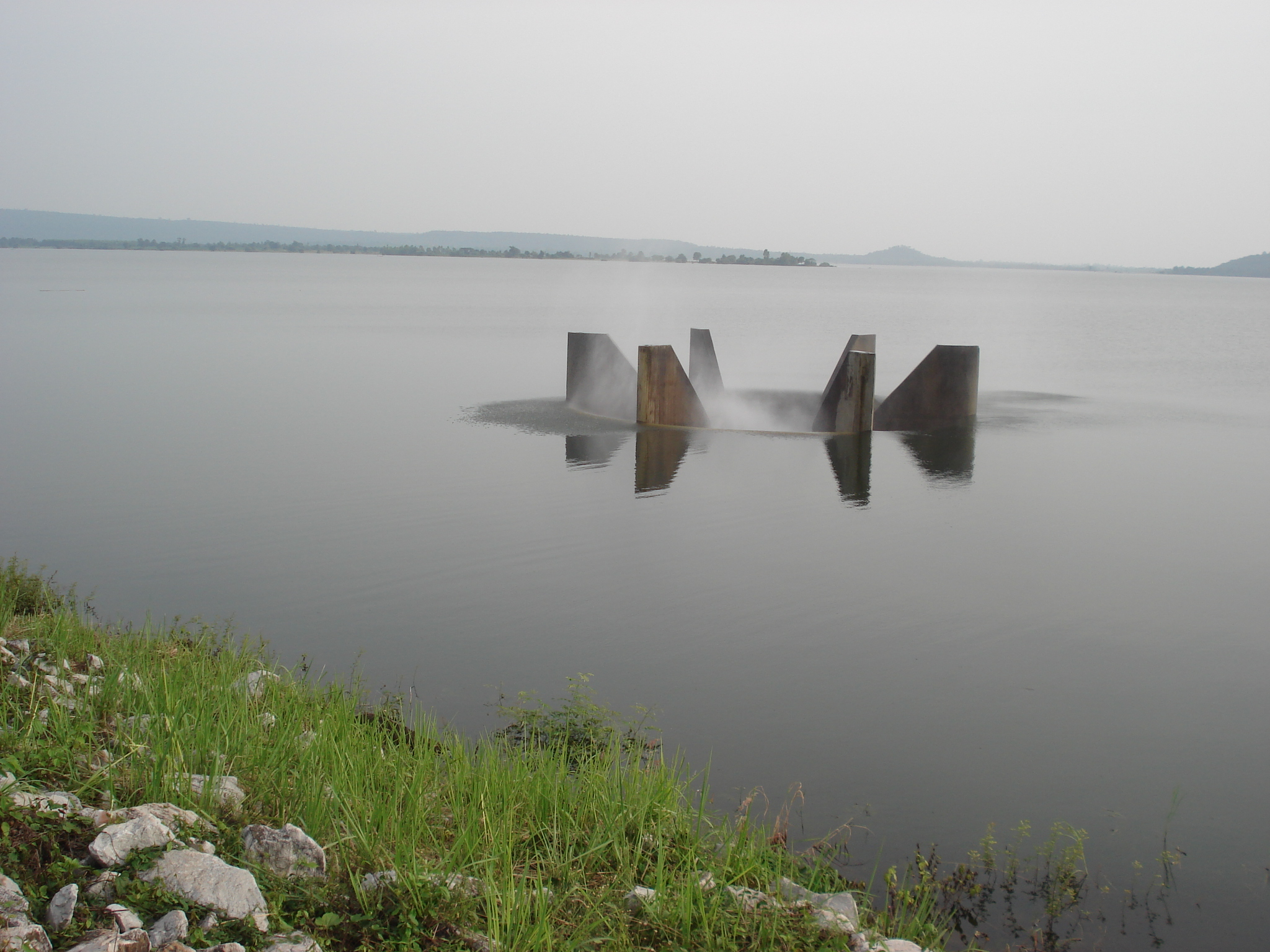
- (Clockwise from top left) Nong Han, Phu Pha Yon National Park, Phra That Choeng Chum and Wat Phra That Choeng Chum, Phu Phan Mountains, Historic building in Ban Tha Rae, View of Nam Un Dam

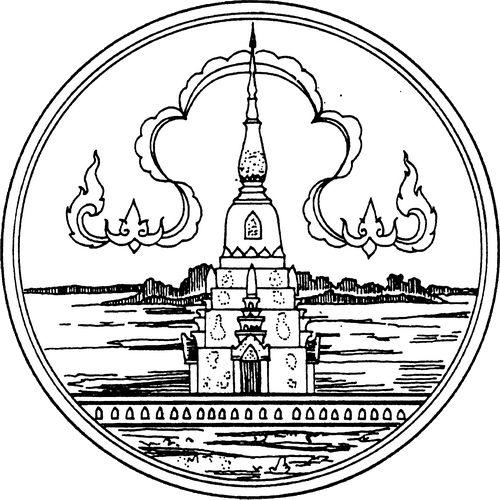
- Flag Seal
- Nickname: Sakon (Thai: สกล)
- Motto: พระธาตุเชิงชุมคู่บ้าน พระตำหนักภูพานคู่เมือง งามลือเลื่องหนองหาน แลตระการปราสาทผึ้ง สวยสุดซึ้งสาวภูไท ถิ่นมั่นในพุทธธรรม ("Home of Phra That Choeng Chum. Home of Phu Phan Palace. The famous Nong Han lake. Fascinating Prasat Phueng. Beautiful Phu Thai women. The lands strong in Buddhism and Dharma.")
- Map of Thailand highlighting Sakon Nakhon province
- Country: Thailand
- Capital: Sakon Nakhon

Government
  - Governor: Chusak Ruying

Area
  - Total: 9,580 km^{2} (3,700 sq mi)
  - Rank: 19th

Population (2024)
  - Total: ▼1,137,772
  - Rank: 18th
  - Density: 119/km^{2} (310/sq mi)
  - Rank: 42nd

Human Achievement Index
  - HAI (2022): 0.6292 "somewhat low" Ranked 54th

GDP
  - Total: baht 56 billion (US$1.9 billion) (2019)
- Time zone: UTC+7 (ICT)
- Postal code: 47xxx
- Calling code: 042
- ISO 3166 code: TH-47
- Vehicle registration: สกลนคร
- Website: sakonnakhon.go.th

Sakon Nakhon Provincial Administrative Organization องค์การบริหารส่วนจังหวัดสกลนคร
- Provincial Administrative Organization
- Interactive map of Sakon Nakhon Provincial Administrative Organization

Government
  - Type: Local administrative divisions
  - Body: Sakon Nakhon Provincial Administrative Organization
  - President: Narumon Sapso
- Website: sakon-pao.go.th

Sakon Nakhon (Thai: สกลนคร, pronounced [sā.kōn ná(ʔ).kʰɔ̄ːn]; Northeastern Thai: สกลนคร, pronounced [sā.kōn nà(ʔ).kʰɔ̂ːn]) is one of Thailand's seventy-six provinces (changwat). It lies in upper Northeastern Thailand. Neighboring provinces are (from north clockwise) Nong Khai, Bueng Kan, Nakhon Phanom, Mukdahan, Kalasin, and Udon Thani. Its capital is Sakon Nakhon.

== Toponymy ==
The word sakon originates from the Sanskrit word sakala (Devanagari: सकल) meaning 'entire', 'whole', or 'total', and the word nakhon from Sanskrit nagara (Devanagari: नगर) meaning 'town' or 'city'. Hence the name of the province literally means "city of cities".

== Geography ==
The province is on the Khorat Plateau, not far from the Mekong. The Nong Han lake, the biggest natural lake of northeast Thailand, near the city of Sakon Nakhon, is a popular resort. The Phu Phan Mountains delimit the province to the south. The total forest area is 1,692 km^{2} (653 sq mi) or 17.7 percent of provincial area.

=== National parks ===
There are three national parks, along with four other national parks, make up region 10 (Udon Thani) of Thailand's protected areas.(Visitors in fiscal year 2024)

Phu Pha Yon National Park	829 km^{2} (320 sq mi)	(19,061)
Phu Phan National Park	665 km^{2} (257 sq mi)	(7,677)
Phu Pha Lek National Park	404 km^{2} (156 sq mi)	(5,569)

Location protected areas of Sakon Nakhon

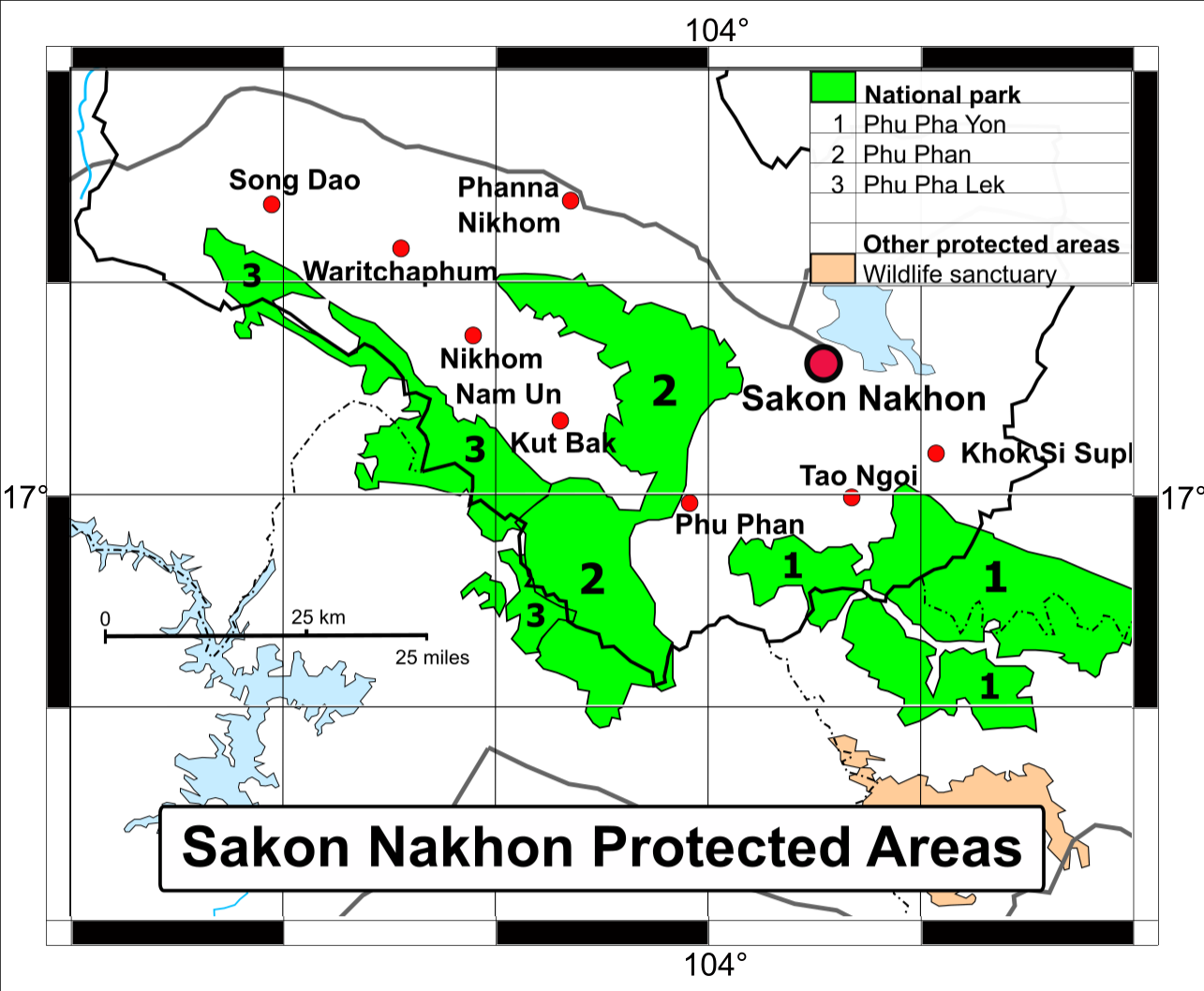
Sakon Nakhon protected areas

	National park
1	Phu Pha Yon
2	Phu Phan
3	Phu Pha Lek

== History ==
The history of Sakon Nakhon dates back to about three thousand years. Local legend says that Mueang Nong Han Luang, or presently Sakhon Nakhon, was built in the 11th century when the Khmer Empire ruled this region. When the Khmer lost its power, the town was under the rule of Lan Xang or Lao Kingdom. It was renamed into "Mueang Chiang Mai Nong Han". When the town was under Siam, it was renamed again into "Sakhon Thawapi" in 1830, during King Rama III's reign, it was renamed "Sakon Nakhon".

Phu Phan Mountains in the area of Sakon Nakhon, especially Sawang Daen Din district, formerly a stronghold of the Communist Party of Thailand.

== Ethnic group ==
The Ethnic group of Sakon Nakhon are Chinese and Vietnamese with Tai Dam as well as Nyaw.

== Symbols ==
The provincial seal shows the Phrathat Choeng Chum, a Lao-style chedi built during the Ayutthaya period over a Khmer-style prang.

The provincial tree is the banaba or Queen's Crape Myrtle (Lagerstroemia speciosa). Black sharkminnow (Labeo chrysophekadion) is the provincial fish.

== Economy ==
Fish and rice are two of the major products of the region.

Kho Khun Pon Yang Kham is branded as Thailand's best-quality beef, produced by Pon Yang Kham Breeding Cooperatives, which was incorporated in 1980 in Ban Pon Yang Kham in Mueang Sankhon Nakhon. It has created a great reputation for the province. Kho Khun Pon Yang Kham is regarded as "Thai Kobe beef".

== Transportation ==
=== Rail ===
Sakon Nakhon does not have a train service yet. People who want to travel to Sakon Nakhon by train can get off at Udon Thani Railway Station in neighboring province Udon Thani. Then take a local bus to Sakon Nakhon, the distance is approximately 156 km.

=== Roads ===
Route 22 leads north to Udon Thani, 160 km distant, and east to Nakhon Phanom (91 km) and the border with Laos. Route 223 leads south to That Phanom (76 km). Route 213 leads west to Kalasin (131 km).

=== Air ===
There is a regional airport, Sakon Nakhon Airport, on the north side of the city.

== Health ==
Sakon Nakhon's main hospital is Sakon Nakhon Hospital, operated by the Ministry of Public Health.

== Administrative divisions ==
Map of eighteen districts

=== Provincial government ===
The province is divided into 18 districts (amphoes). The districts are further divided into 125 subdistricts (tambons) and 1,323 villages (mubans).

1. Mueang Sakon Nakhon
2. Kusuman
3. Kut Bak
4. Phanna Nikhom
5. Phang Khon
6. Waritchaphum
7. Nikhom Nam Un
8. Wanon Niwat
9. Kham Ta Kla
10. Ban Muang
11. Akat Amnuai
12. Sawang Daen Din
13. Song Dao
14. Tao Ngoi
15. Khok Si Suphan
16. Charoen Sin
17. Phon Na Kaeo
18. Phu Phan

=== Local government ===
As of 26 November 2019 there are: one Sakon Nakhon Provincial Administration Organisation (ongkan borihan suan changwat) and 66 municipal (thesaban) areas in the province. Sakon Nakhon has city (thesaban nakhon) status. Further 65 subdistrict municipalities (thesaban tambon). The non-municipal areas are administered by 74 Subdistrict Administrative Organisations - SAO (ongkan borihan suan tambon).

== Human achievement index 2022 ==
Health	Education	Employment	Income
38	72	43	70
Housing	Family	Transport	Participation
11	8	29	55
Province Sakon Nakhon, with an HAI 2022 value of 0.6292 is "somewhat low", occupies place 54 in the ranking.

Since 2003, United Nations Development Programme (UNDP) in Thailand has tracked progress on human development at sub-national level using the Human achievement index (HAI), a composite index covering all the eight key areas of human development. National Economic and Social Development Board (NESDB) has taken over this task since 2017.

Rank	Classification
1 - 13	"high"
14 - 29	"somewhat high"
30 - 45	"average"
46 - 61	"somewhat low"
62 - 77	"low"

Map with provinces and HAI 2022 rankings

== Important places ==
Sakon Nakhon is a location of many important places, apart from Nong Han and Phu Phan Mountains, include

- Phu Phan National Park
- Phu Pha Yon National Park
- Phu Pha Lek National Park
- Nam Un Dam
- Wat Phra That Choeng Chum
- Phu Phan Rajanivet Palace

== Events and festivals ==
- Prasat Pueng Procession: held during the 12th-15th day of waxing moon in October to mark the end of Buddhist Lent. On the night of 13thday, people will join hands in decoration Prasat Pueng (wax castle) at Ming Mueang Field. The 14thday, wax castel from various temples will join the procession, roaming the municipality to Wat Phra That Choeng Chum. Isan people believe that the wax will welcome Buddha who comes back from the heaven to help all creatures on earth.
- Regatta: held synchronically with the Prasat Pueng Procession, the ancient regatta will be held at Phang Thong Pond or Tha Nang Ap, Ban Tha Wat.
- Tha Rae Star Procession: is a tradition unique to the world and has been held annually during Christmas Eve since 1982, the celebrations and procession will take place at Ban Tha Rae, home to Thailand's largest Roman Catholic community, in Mueang Sakhon Nakhon.

== Notable people ==
=== Born in Sakhon Nakhon ===
- Dusit Chalermsan: professional footballer, football coach
- Suree Sukha: professional footballer
- Surat Sukha: professional footballer
- Sinthaweechai Hathairattanakool: professional footballer
- Poonsawat Kratingdaenggym: a world-class professional boxer

== See also ==
- Khit cloth

== Gallery ==
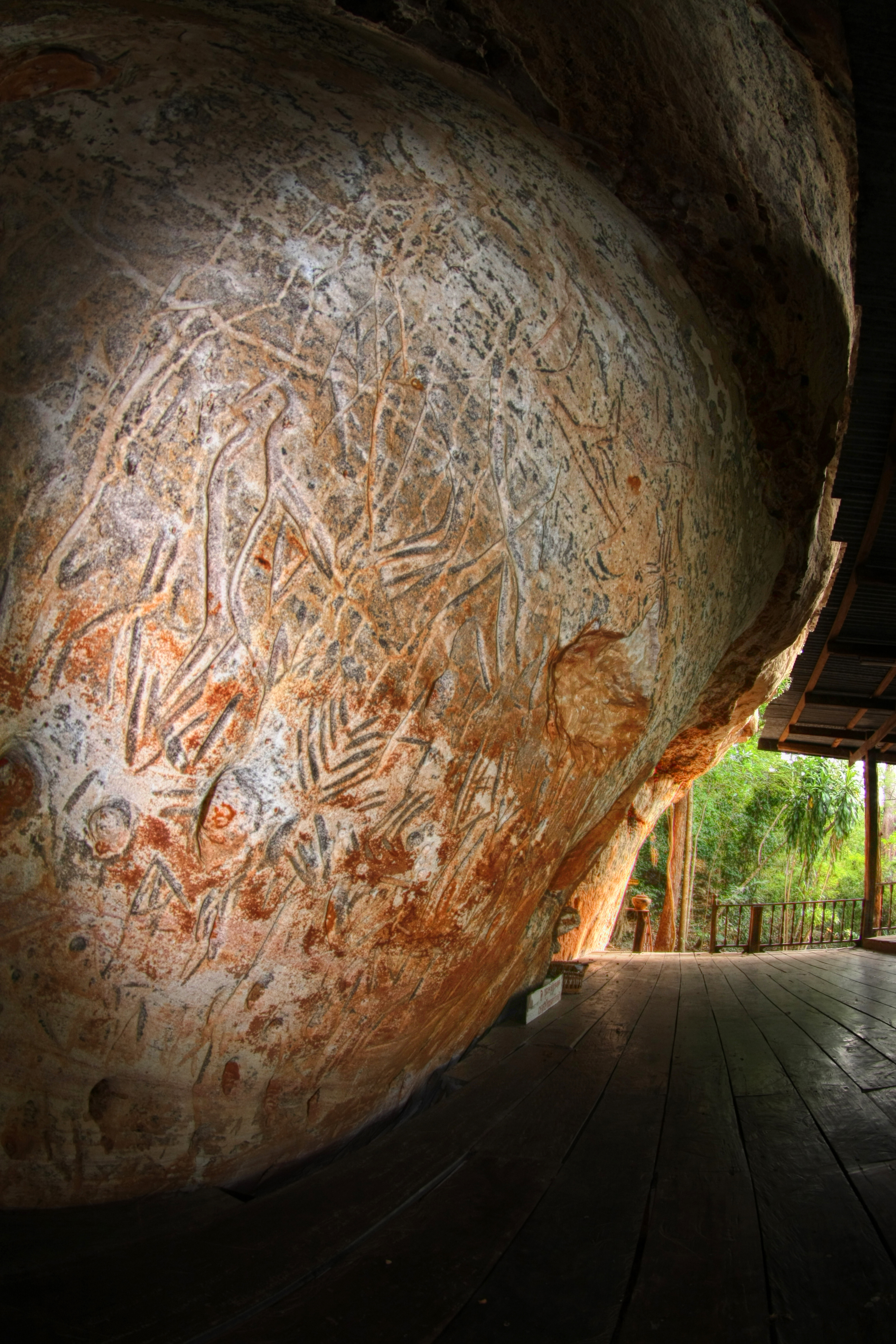
3,000-year-old petroglyphs at Phu Pha Yon National Park

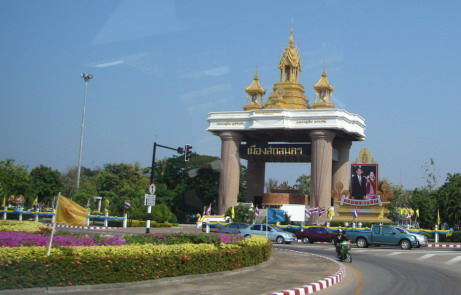
Sakon Nakhon City Gate

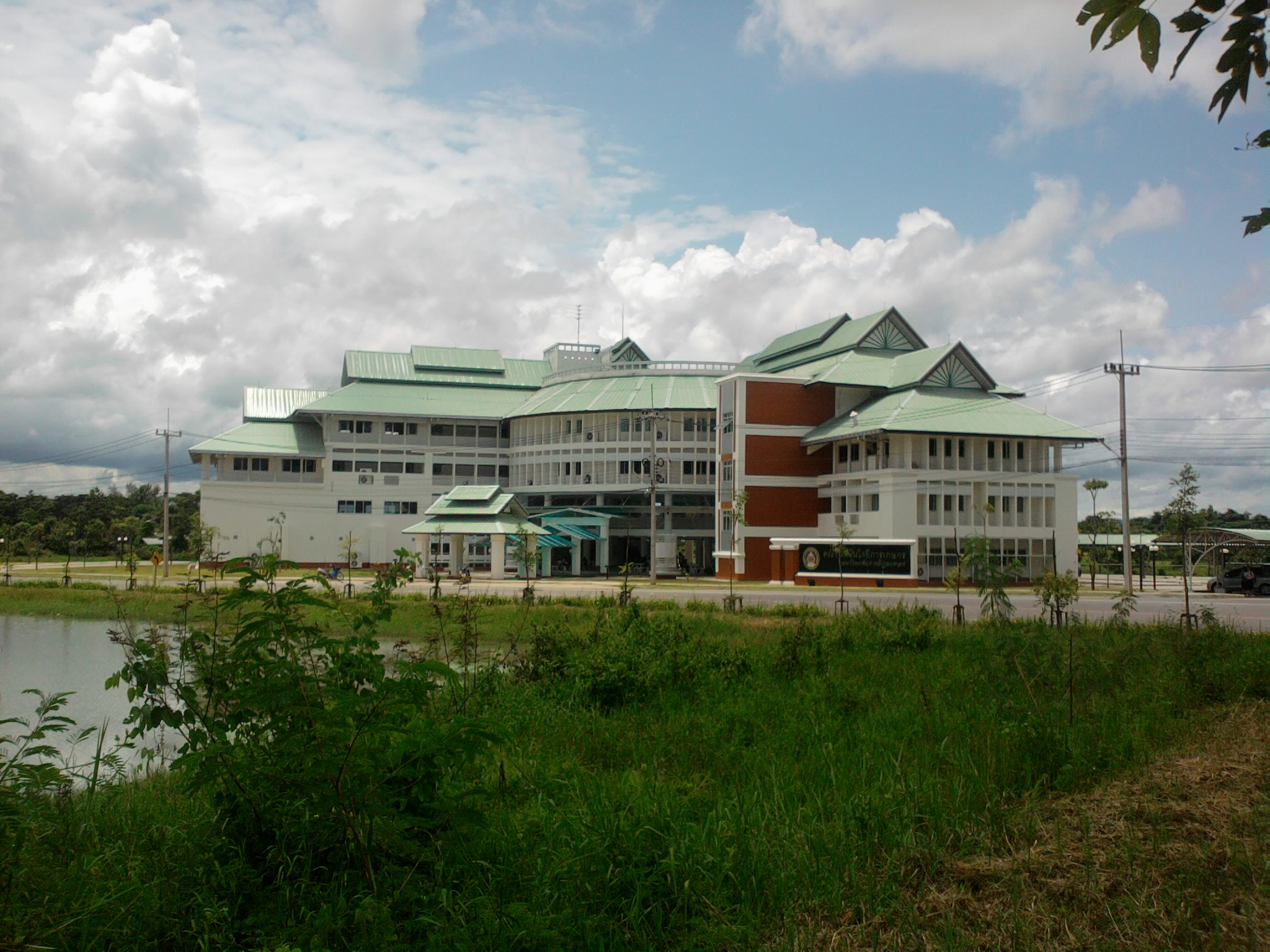
Faculty of Agricultural Technology, Sakon Nakhon Rajabhat University

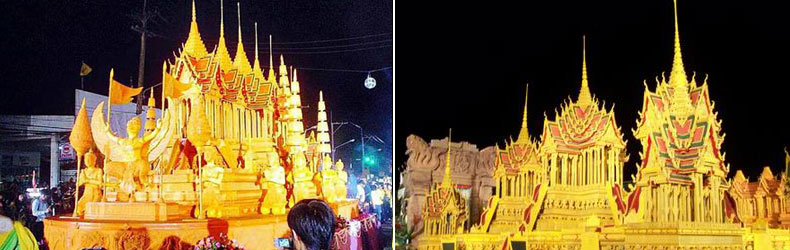
Wax Castle Procession
