= Chom Chaeng =

Village in Nong Khai Province, Thailand

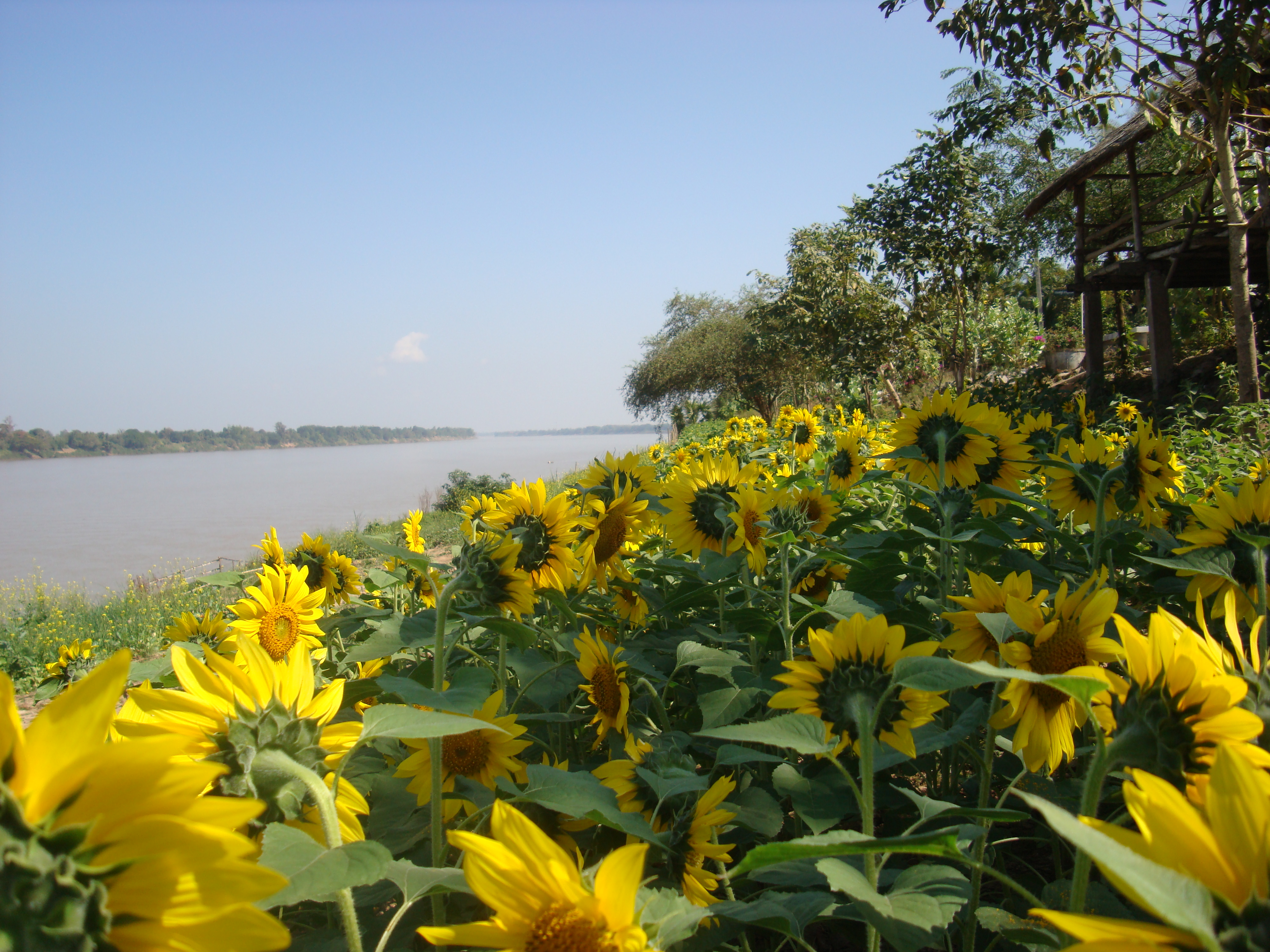
Sunflower field, Mekong River

Chom Chaeng (Thai: จอมเเจ้ง) is a village 18 kilometers east of the provincial capital Nong Khai in Nong Khai Province, Thailand. It is in Amphoe Mueang Nong Khai, sub-district (Tambon) Si Kai. The village sits across from Laos on the Mekong River.

The village has two popular local income-generating groups, an OTOP (One Tambon One Product), and Home Stay group.
