= Na Yung district =

Na Yung นายูง
- District
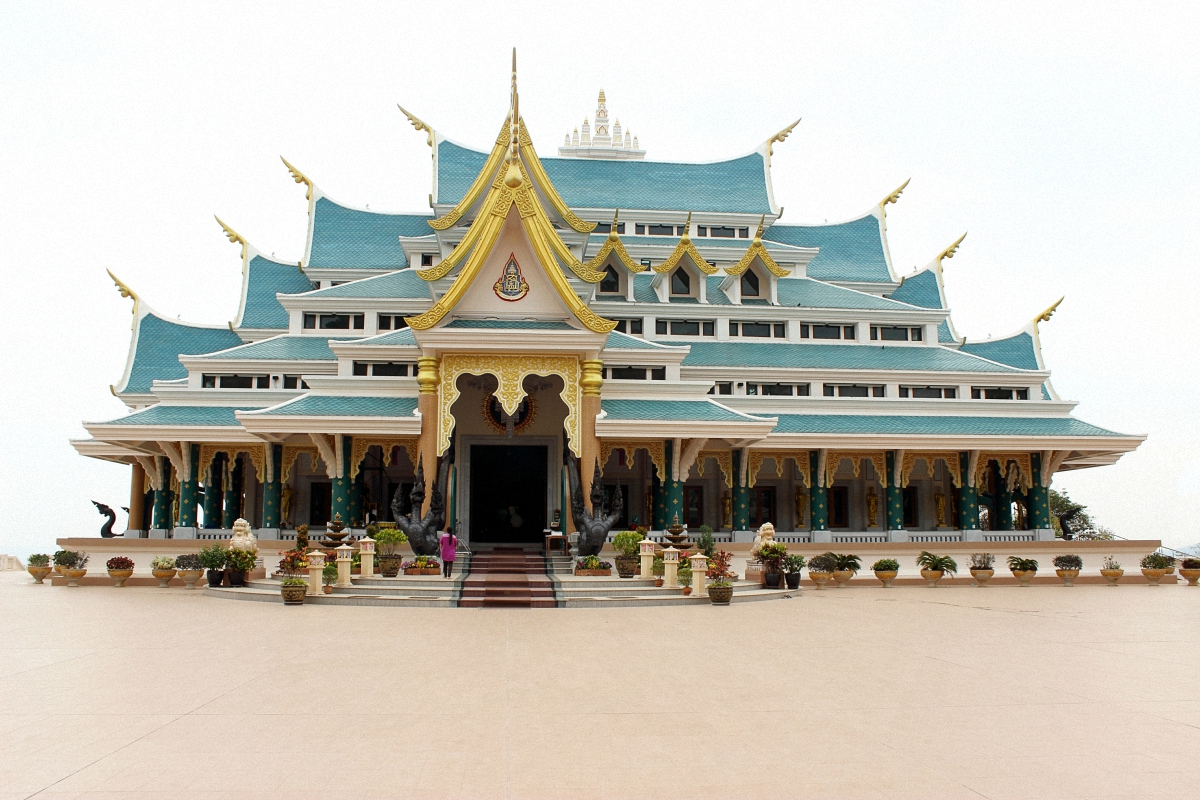
- Wat Pa Phu Kon

- District location in Udon Thani province
- Coordinates: 17°53′48″N 102°9′0″E
- Country: Thailand
- Province: Udon Thani
- Seat: Ban Kong

Area
  - Total: 524.0 km^{2} (202.3 sq mi)

Population (2005)
  - Total: 25,701
  - Density: 49/km^{2} (130/sq mi)
- Time zone: UTC+7 (ICT)
- Postal code: 41380
- Geocode: 4122

Na Yung (Thai: นายูง, pronounced [nāː jūːŋ]) is the northwesternmost district (amphoe) of Udon Thani province, northeastern Thailand.

== History ==
The area was separated from Nam Som district and created as a minor district (king amphoe) on 1 January 1988. It was upgraded to a full district on 7 September 1995.

== Geography ==
Neighboring districts are (from the southeast clockwise) Ban Phue and Nam Som of Udon Thani Province, Pak Chom of Loei province, Sangkhom and Pho Tak of Nong Khai province.

== Administration ==
The district is divided into four sub-districts (tambons), which are further subdivided into 40 villages (mubans). There are no municipal (thesaban) areas, and four tambon administrative organizations (TAO).

No.	Name	Thai name	Villages	Pop.
1.	Na Yung	นายูง	10	7,602
2.	Ban Kong	บ้านก้อง	11	6,627
3.	Na Khae	นาแค	8	4,148
4.	Non Thong	โนนทอง	11	7,324
