= Si Kai =

Si Kai สีกาย
- Tambon
- Country: Thailand
- Province: Nong Khai
- District: Mueang Nong Khai

Area
  - Total: 20.46 km^{2} (7.90 sq mi)

Population (2008)
  - Total: 3,490
  - Density: 171/km^{2} (442/sq mi)
- Postal Code: 43000
- Geocode: 430119

Si Kai (Thai: สีกาย) is a sub-district (tambon) 18 kilometers east of the provincial capital of Nong Khai in Nong Khai Province, Thailand.

== Geography ==
The sub-district is in the northeast of Mueang Nong Khai District on the shore of the Mekong River, which is marks the northern boundary of the sub-district. To the west is Hin Ngom Sub-district, to the south Lao Tang Kham of Amphoe Phon Phisai, and to the east the sub-district Ban Duea.

== History ==
The sub-district was created effective 1 August 1982 by splitting off seven villages from Hin Ngom Sub-district. The tambon administrative organization (TAO) as the local government unit was established on 13 February 1997.

== Administration ==
The sub-administrative district consists of eight administrative villages (muban).

1.	Ban Chom Chaeng	บ้านจอมแจ้ง
2.	Ban Si Kai Tai	บ้านสีกายใต้
3.	Ban Fai Taek	บ้านฝายแตก
4.	Ban Pong	บ้านบง
5.	Ban Dong Wen	บ้านดงเวร
6.	Ban Si Kai Nuea	บ้านสีกายเหนือ
7.	Ban Santi Suk	บ้านสันติสุข
8.	Ban Sangkhom Phatthana	บ้านสังคมพัฒนา
