= Ban Phue district =

Ban Phue บ้านผือ
- District
- District location in Udon Thani province
- Coordinates: 17°41′15″N 102°28′22″E
- Country: Thailand
- Province: Udon Thani
- Seat: Ban Phue

Area
  - Total: 991.2 km^{2} (382.7 sq mi)

Population (2008)
  - Total: 107,965
  - Density: 108.2/km^{2} (280/sq mi)
- Time zone: UTC+7 (ICT)
- Postal code: 41190
- Geocode: 4117

Ban Phue (Thai: บ้านผือ, pronounced [bâːn pʰɯ̌ː]) is a district (amphoe) in the northwestern part of Udon Thani province, northeastern Thailand.

== Geography ==
Neighboring districts are (from the north clockwise) Sangkhom, Pho Tak, Tha Bo, and Sakhrai of Nong Khai province, Phen, Mueang Udon Thani, and Kut Chap of Udon Thani Province, Suwannakhuha of Nong Bua Lamphu province, and Nam Som and Na Yung of Udon Thani.

Located within the district is the Phu Phra Bat Historical Park and the Phu Phra Bat Buabok Forest Park.

== Administration ==
The district is divided into 13 sub-districts (tambons), which are further divided into 165 villages (mubans). Ban Phue is a sub-district municipality (thesaban tambon) which covers parts of tambon Ban Phue. There are a further 13 tambon administrative organizations (TAO).

No.	Name	Thai	Villages	Pop.
1.	Ban Phue	บ้านผือ	14	13,286
2.	Hai Sok	หายโศก	17	10,874
3.	Khuea Nam	เขือน้ำ	14	9,038
4.	Kham Bong	คำบง	11	6,838
5.	Non Thong	โนนทอง	11	10,562
6.	Khao San	ข้าวสาร	14	5,746
7.	Champa Mong	จำปาโมง	17	10,540
8.	Klang Yai	กลางใหญ่	13	8,805
9.	Mueang Phan	เมืองพาน	16	8,521
10.	Kham Duang	คำด้วง	11	6,569
11.	Nong Hua Khu	หนองหัวคู	11	7,233
12.	Ban Kho	บ้านค้อ	6	3,146
13.	Nong Waeng	หนองแวง	10	6,807
