= Vongsak Swasdipanich =

Vongsak Swasdipanich (Thai: วงศ์ศักดิ์ สวัสดิ์พาณิชย์; born June 27, 1951, in Roi Et) was the Governor of the Ratchaburi Province, Thailand since 2005. He served previously as Governor of the Nong Khai Province (2004) and as Vice-Governor (2001) in the Phuket Province.

Vongsak Swasdipanich holds a Master of Public Administration (Planning), Kentucky State University. He received a lot of positive attention in 2007 when he signed a Memorandum of Friendship & Understanding (MOFU) between Ratchaburi Province, Thailand and the Kota Kinabalu City Hall (KKCH), Sabah, Malaysia as he has taken another step in promoting urban tourism and mutual friendship.

As of October 2008 Vongsak Swasdipanich has been promoted to the Position of Director General of the Provincial Administration in Bangkok.
