= Nam Som district =

Nam Som น้ำโสม
- District
- District location in Udon Thani province
- Coordinates: 17°46′14″N 102°11′23″E
- Country: Thailand
- Province: Udon Thani
- Seat: Ban Yuak

Area
  - Total: 742.129 km^{2} (286.538 sq mi)

Population (2005)
  - Total: 55,622
  - Density: 74.9/km^{2} (194/sq mi)
- Time zone: UTC+7 (ICT)
- Postal code: 41210
- Geocode: 4118

Nam Som (Thai: น้ำโสม, pronounced [náːm sǒːm]) is a district (amphoe) in the northwestern part of Udon Thani province, northeastern Thailand.

== Geography ==
Neighboring districts are (from the north clockwise) Na Yung, Ban Phue of Udon Thani Province, Suwannakhuha of Nong Bua Lamphu province, and Pak Chom of Loei province. Na Yung-Nam Som National Park lies within the district's boundaries.

== History ==
The minor district (king amphoe) was created on 12 May 1969, when the two tambons Nam Som and Na Yung were split off from Ban Phue district. The third tambon Nong Waeng was added on 4 July 1969. The minor district was upgraded to a full district on 1 April 1974.

== Administration ==
The district is divided into seven sub-districts (tambons), which are further subdivided into 80 villages (mubans). There are two townships (thesaban tambons). Na Ngua covers parts of tambons Na Ngua and Si Samran; Nam Som cover parts of tambons Nam Som and Si Samran. There are a further seven tambon administrative organizations (TAO).

No.	Name	Thai name	Villages	Pop.
1.	Na Ngua	นางัว	10	8,848
2.	Nam Som	น้ำโสม	16	10,860
5.	Nong Waeng	หนองแวง	13	8,061
6.	Ban Yuak	บ้านหยวก	15	9,307
7.	Som Yiam	โสมเยี่ยม	6	4,215
10.	Si Samran	ศรีสำราญ	12	8,567
12.	Samakkhi	สามัคคี	8	5,764

Missing numbers are tambon which now form Na Yung District.
