= Sakhrai district =

Sakhrai สระใคร
- District
- District location in Nong Khai province
- Coordinates: 17°40′30″N 102°45′2″E
- Country: Thailand
- Province: Nong Khai
- Seat: Sakhrai

Area
  - Total: 210.90 km^{2} (81.43 sq mi)

Population (2005)
  - Total: 25,247
  - Density: 119.7/km^{2} (310/sq mi)
- Time zone: UTC+7 (ICT)
- Postal code: 43150
- Geocode: 4314

Sakhrai (Thai: สระใคร, pronounced [sàʔ.kʰrāj]; Northeastern Thai: สระใคร, pronounced [sáʔ.kʰa᷇j]) is a district (amphoe) of Nong Khai province, northeastern Thailand.

== History ==
The minor district (king amphoe) was split off from Mueang Nong Khai district on 30 April 1994.

On 15 May 2007, all 81 minor districts were upgraded to full districts. Publication in the Royal Gazette on 24 August the upgrade became official.

== Geography ==
Sakhrai is bordered by the following districts: Tha Bo and Mueang Nong Khai of Nong Khai Province, and Phen and Ban Phue of Udon Thani province.

== Administration ==
The district is divided into three sub-districts (tambons), which are further subdivided into 39 villages (mubans). There are no municipal (thesaban) areas. There are three tambon administrative organizations (TAO).

| No. | Name | Thai name | Villages | Pop. |
|---|---|---|---|---|
| 1. | Sakhrai | สระใคร | 15 | 10,053 |
| 2. | Khok Chang | คอกช้าง | 12 | 6,161 |
| 3. | Ban Fang | บ้านฝาง | 12 | 8,994 |

== Gallery ==
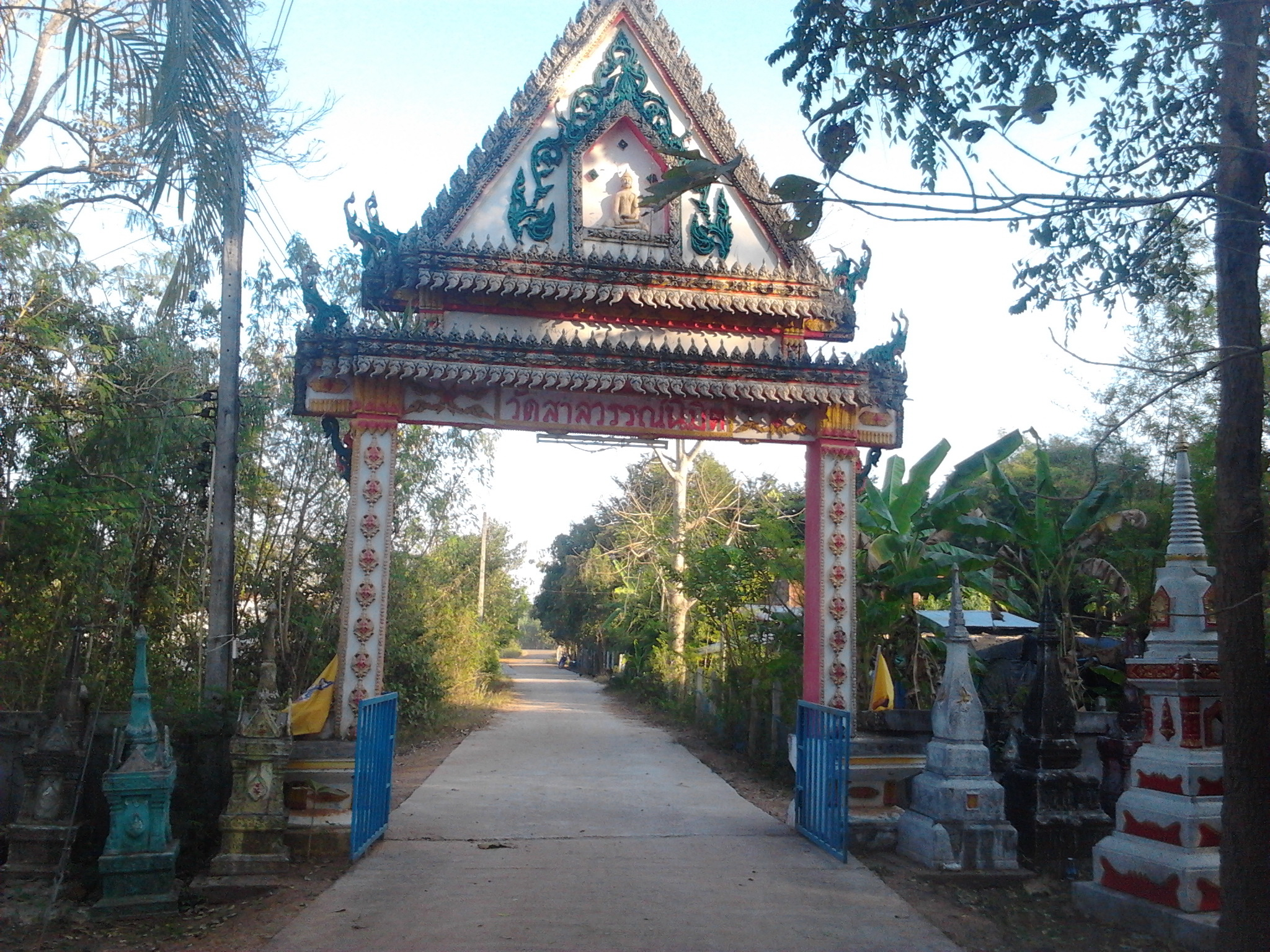
Wat Salawan Nimit, Sakhrai

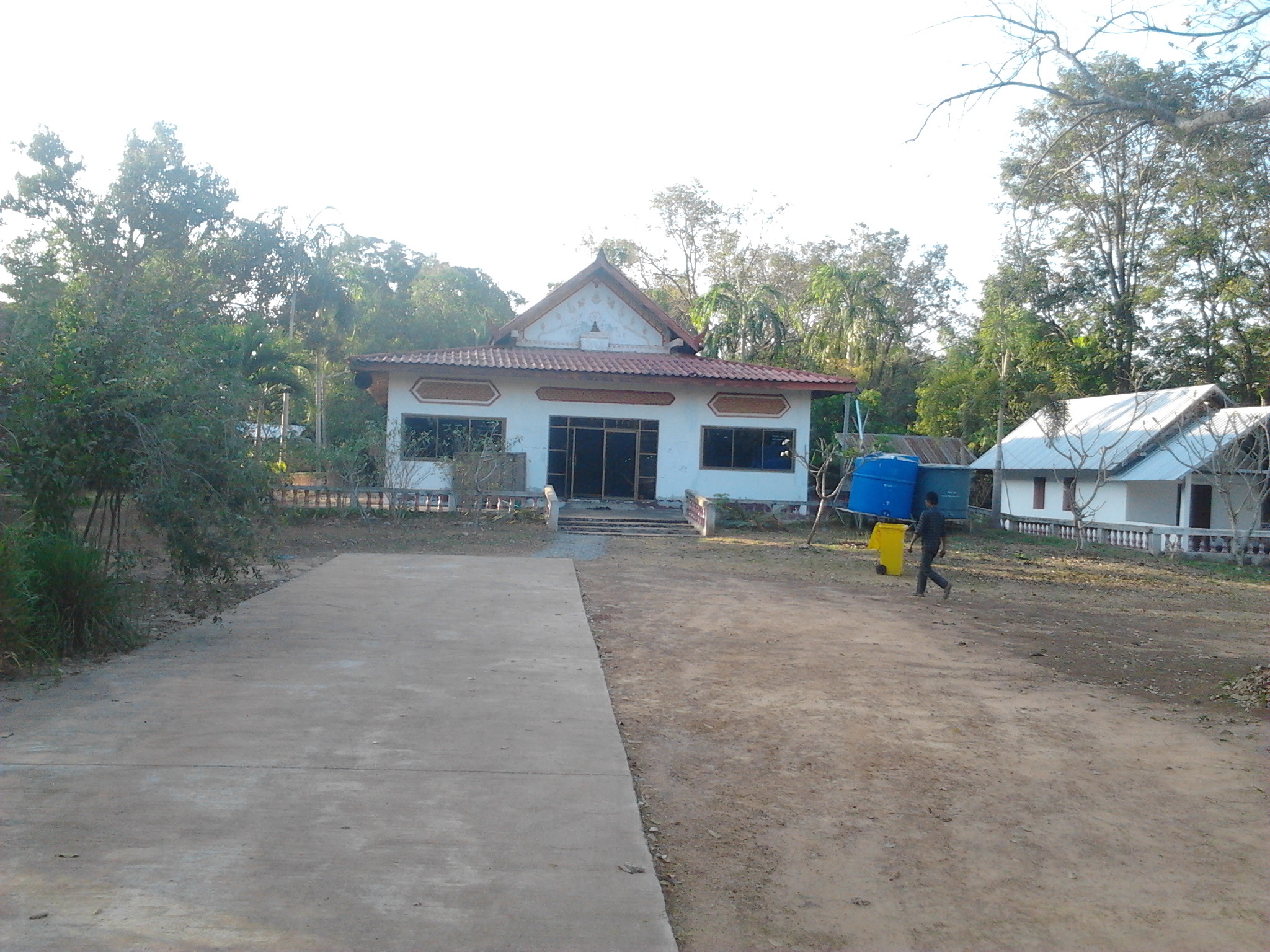
Wat Salawan Nimit, Sakhrai

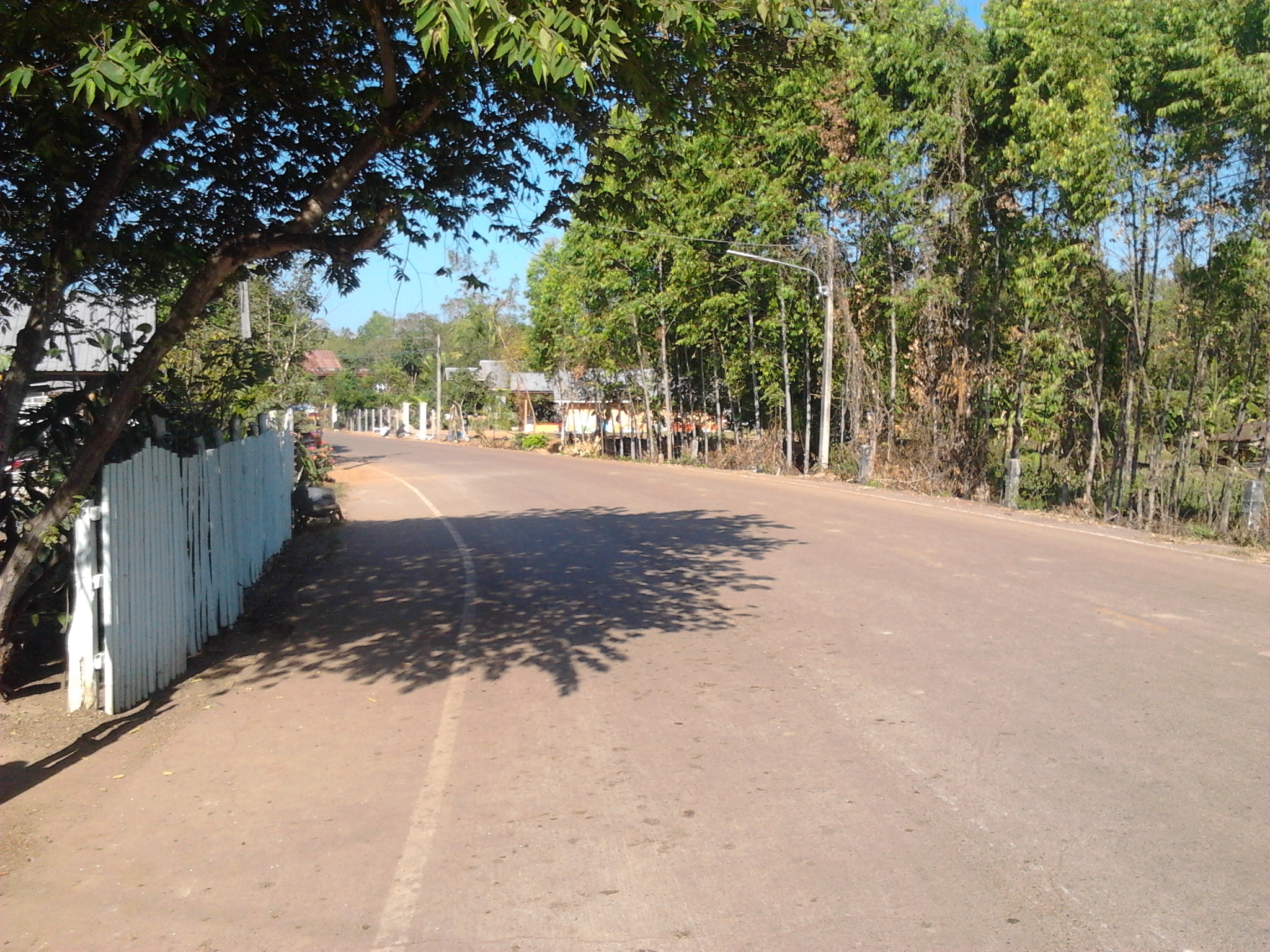
Sakhrai

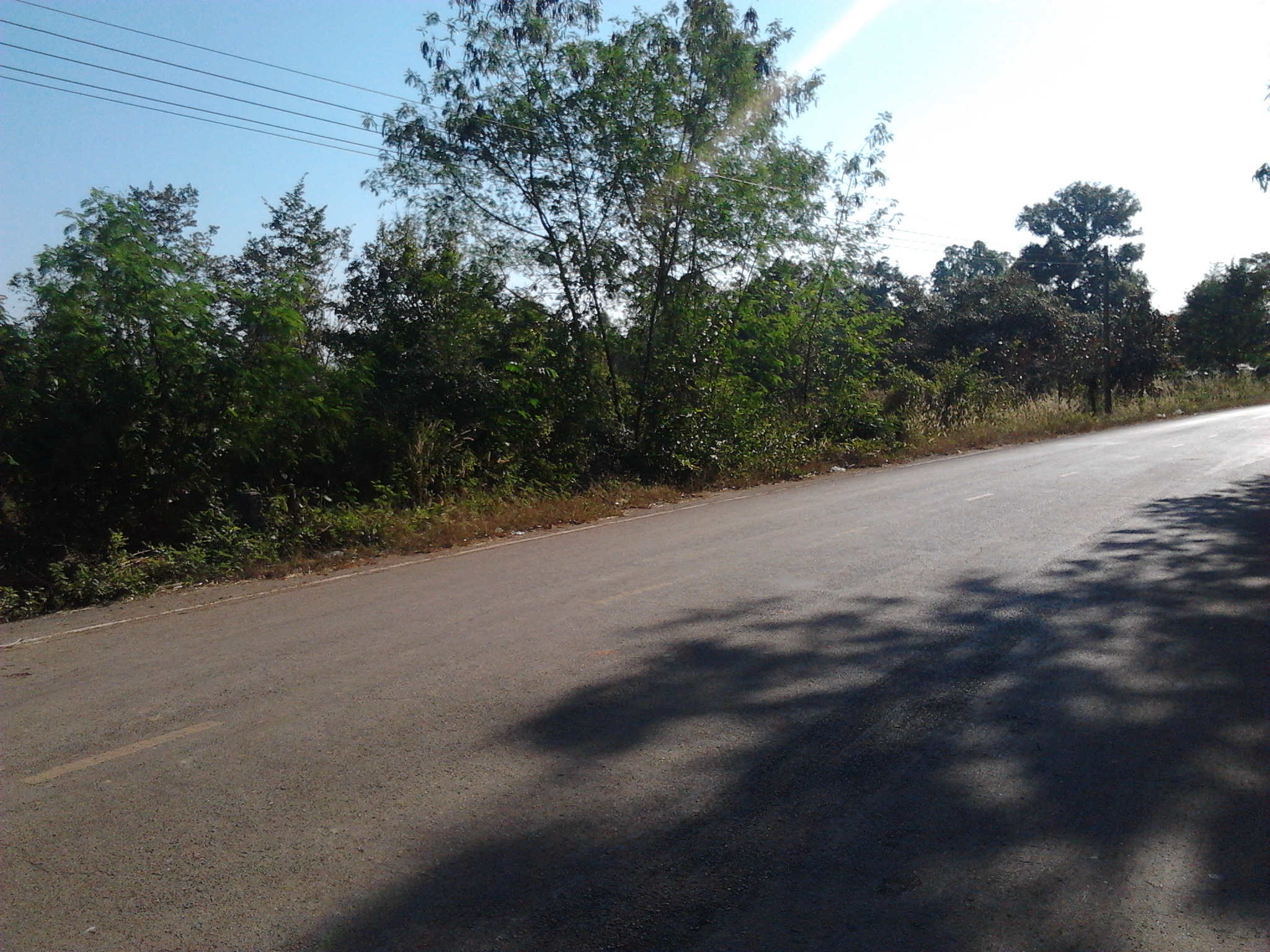
Road in Sakhrai
