= Suwannakhuha district =

Suwannakhuha สุวรรณคูหา
- District
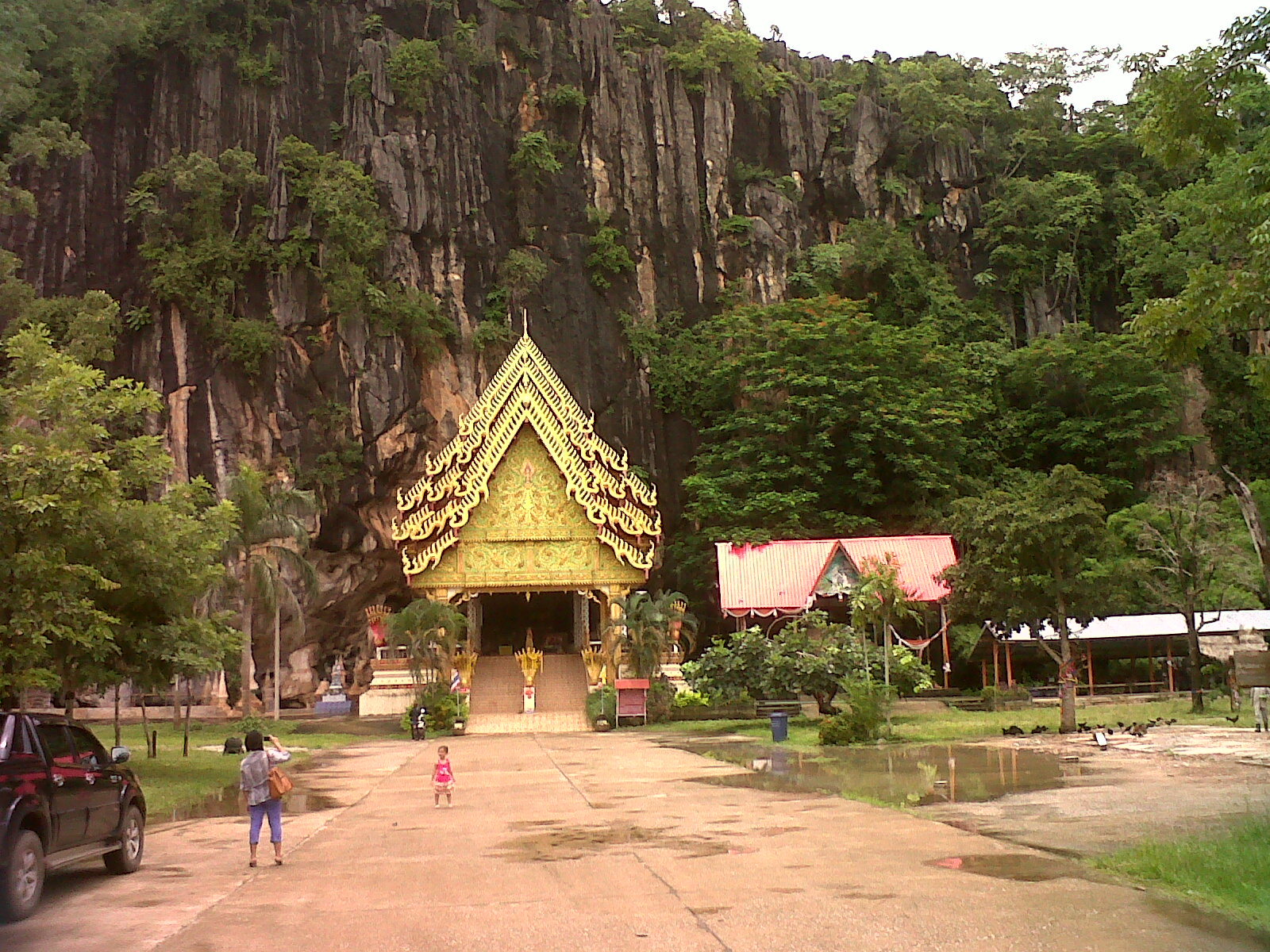
- Wat Tham Suwannakuha; Cave temple Suwannakuha

- District location in Nongbua Lamphu province
- Coordinates: 17°33′48″N 102°16′47″E
- Country: Thailand
- Province: Nong Bua Lamphu
- Seat: Suwannakhuha

Area
  - Total: 646.1 km^{2} (249.5 sq mi)

Population (2005)
  - Total: 66,277
  - Density: 102.6/km^{2} (266/sq mi)
- Time zone: UTC+7 (ICT)
- Postal code: 39270
- Geocode: 3905

Suwannakhuha (Thai: สุวรรณคูหา, pronounced [sù.wān.nā.kʰūː.hǎː]; Northeastern Thai: สุวรรณคูหา, pronounced [sȕ.wân.nā.kʰûː.hǎː]) is the northernmost district (amphoe) of Nong Bua Lamphu province, northeastern Thailand.

== History ==
The minor district (king amphoe) was created on 17 July 1973, when the three tambons Na Si, Ban Khok, and Na Di were split off from Na Klang district. It was upgraded to a full district on 25 March 1979. In 1993 it was one of five districts of Udon Thani Province which formed the new province, Nong Bua Lamphu.

== Geography ==
Neighboring districts are (from the south clockwise): Na Klang of Nong Bua Lamphu Province; Na Duang of Loei province; Nam Som, Ban Phue, and Kut Chap of Udon Thani province.

== Administration ==
The district is divided into eight sub-districts (tambons), which are further subdivided into 92 villages (mubans). There are two townships (thesaban tambons): Suwannakhuha town with a population of 4,462 covers parts of tambons Suwannakhuha, Na Si, and Kut Phueng. Ban Khok covers parts of tambon Ban Khok. There are a further seven tambon administrative organizations (TAO).

No.	Name	Thai name	Villages	Population
1	Na Si	นาสี	14	8,269
2	Ban Khok	บ้านโคก	13	12,395
3	Na Di	นาดี	12	10,609
4	Na Dan	นาด่าน	11	8,736
5	Dong Mafai	ดงมะไฟ	12	10,272
6	Suwannakhuha	สุวรรณคูหา	13	4,462
7	Bun Than	บุญทัน	9	5,841
8	Kut Phueng	กุดผึ้ง	8	5,693
