= Sangkhom district =

Sangkhom สังคม
- District
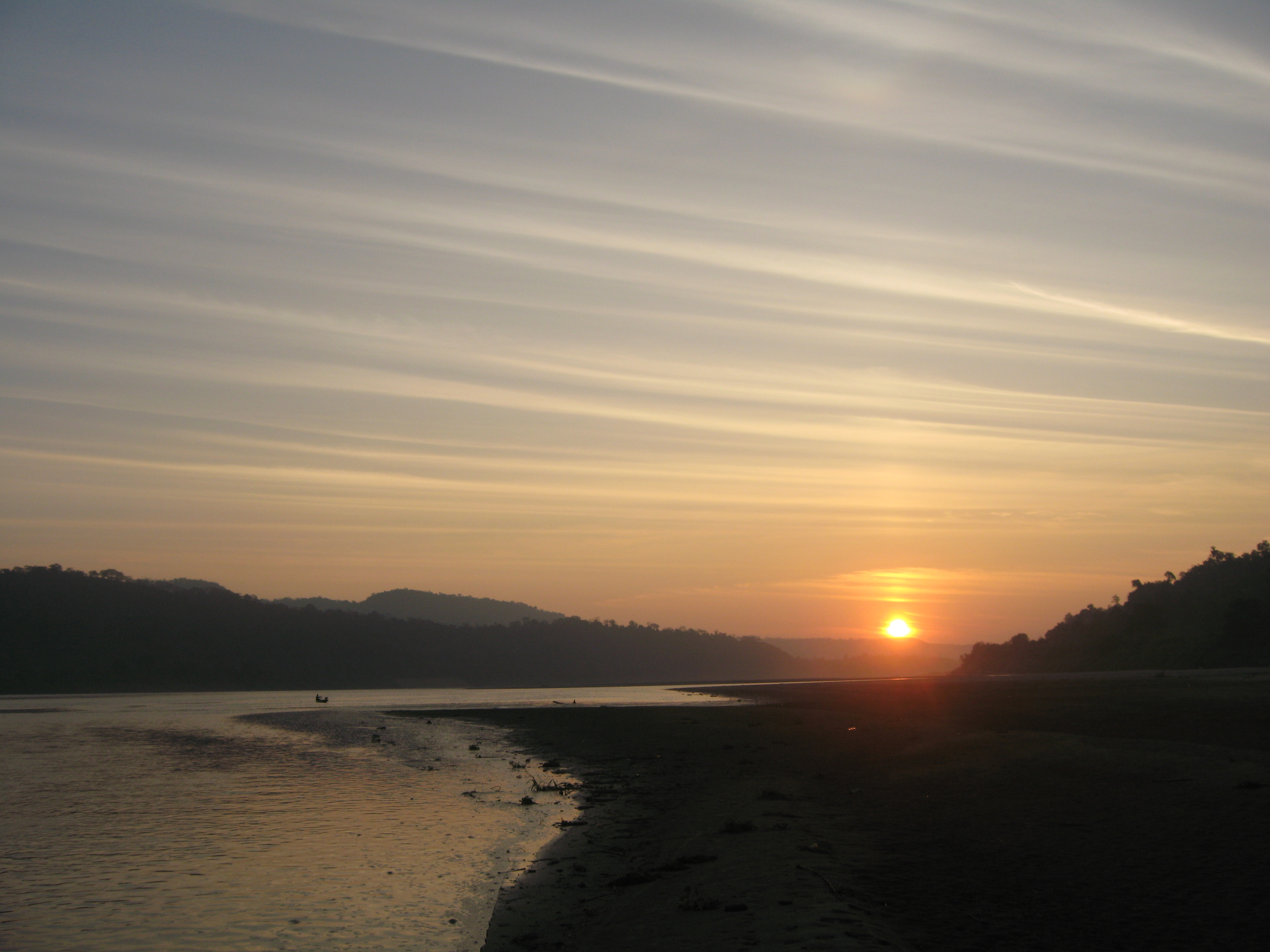
- Sunrise over the Mekong River

- District location in Nong Khai province
- Coordinates: 18°3′51″N 102°16′24″E
- Country: Thailand
- Province: Nong Khai
- Seat: Kaeng Kai

Area
  - Total: 449.7 km^{2} (173.6 sq mi)

Population (2005)
  - Total: 22,998
  - Density: 51.1/km^{2} (132/sq mi)
- Time zone: UTC+7 (ICT)
- Postal code: 43160
- Geocode: 4308

Sangkhom (Thai: สังคม, pronounced [sǎŋ.kʰōm]) is the westernmost district (amphoe) of Nong Khai province, northeastern Thailand.

== Geography ==
Neighboring districts are (from the east clockwise): Si Chiang Mai and Pho Tak of Nong Khai Province; Na Yung of Udon Thani province; and Pak Chom of Loei province. To the north across the Mekong River is the Lao province Vientiane Prefecture.

== History ==
Originally the area was a tambon of Tha Bo district, which became part of the newly established Si Chiang Mai district on 4 August 1958. It was established as a minor district (king amphoe) on 1 March 1966, and upgraded to a full district on 16 November 1971. From 14 November 1975 to 14 November 1978 the district was under military administration as part of a military operation.

== Symbols ==
The district slogan is "Naga Fireball Festival; famous dried bananas; golden beaches".

== Administration ==
The district is divided into five sub-districts (tambons), which are further subdivided into 36 villages (mubans). Sangkhom is a township (thesaban tambon) which covers parts of tambons Sangkhom and Kaeng Kai. There are a further five tambon administrative organizations (TAO).

No.	Name	Thai name	Villages	Pop.
1.	Kaeng Kai	แก้งไก่	6	4,304
2.	Pha Tang	ผาตั้ง	7	5,724
3.	Ban Muang	บ้านม่วง	7	3,030
4.	Na Ngio	นางิ้ว	9	6,094
5.	Sangkhom	สังคม	7	3,846
