= Kut Chap district =

KutChap กุดจับ
- District
- District location in Udon Thani province
- Coordinates: 17°25′32″N 102°34′0″E
- Country: Thailand
- Province: Udon Thani
- Seat: Mueang Phia

Area
  - Total: 785.0 km^{2} (303.1 sq mi)

Population (2005)
  - Total: 62,301
  - Density: 79.4/km^{2} (206/sq mi)
- Time zone: UTC+7 (ICT)
- Postal code: 41250
- Geocode: 4102

Kut Chap (Thai: กุดจับ, pronounced [kùt tɕàp]; Northeastern Thai: กุดจับ, pronounced [kǔt tɕǎp]) is a district (amphoe) in the western part of Udon Thani province, northeastern Thailand.

== Geography ==
Neighboring districts are (from the north clockwise): Ban Phue, Mueang Udon Thani and Nong Wua So of Udon Thani Province; Na Klang and Suwannakhuha of Nong Bua Lamphu province

== History ==
The minor district (king amphoe) was created on 20 July 1972, when the three tambons, Kut Chap, Pa Kho, and Chiang Pheng, were split off from Mueang Udon Thani district. It was upgraded to a full district on 8 September 1976.

== Administration ==
The district is divided into seven sub-districts (tambons), which are further subdivided into 94 villages (mubans). There are four townships (thesaban tambons), Chiang Pheng, Sang Ko, and Tan Lian each covers parts of the same-named tambons, and Kut Chap covers parts of tambons Kut Chap and Mueang Phia. There are a further seven tambon administrative organizations (TAO).

No.	Name	Thai name	Villages	Pop.
1.	Kut Chap	กุดจับ	11	8,818
2.	Pa Kho	ปะโค	14	8,900
3.	Khon Yung	ขอนยูง	14	8,935
4.	Chiang Pheng	เชียงเพ็ง	14	9,211
5.	Sang Ko	สร้างก่อ	13	8,377
6.	Mueang Phia	เมืองเพีย	15	12,414
7.	Tan Lian	ตาลเลียน	13	5,646
