= Mueang Nong Khai district =

Mueang Nong Khai เมืองหนองคาย
- District
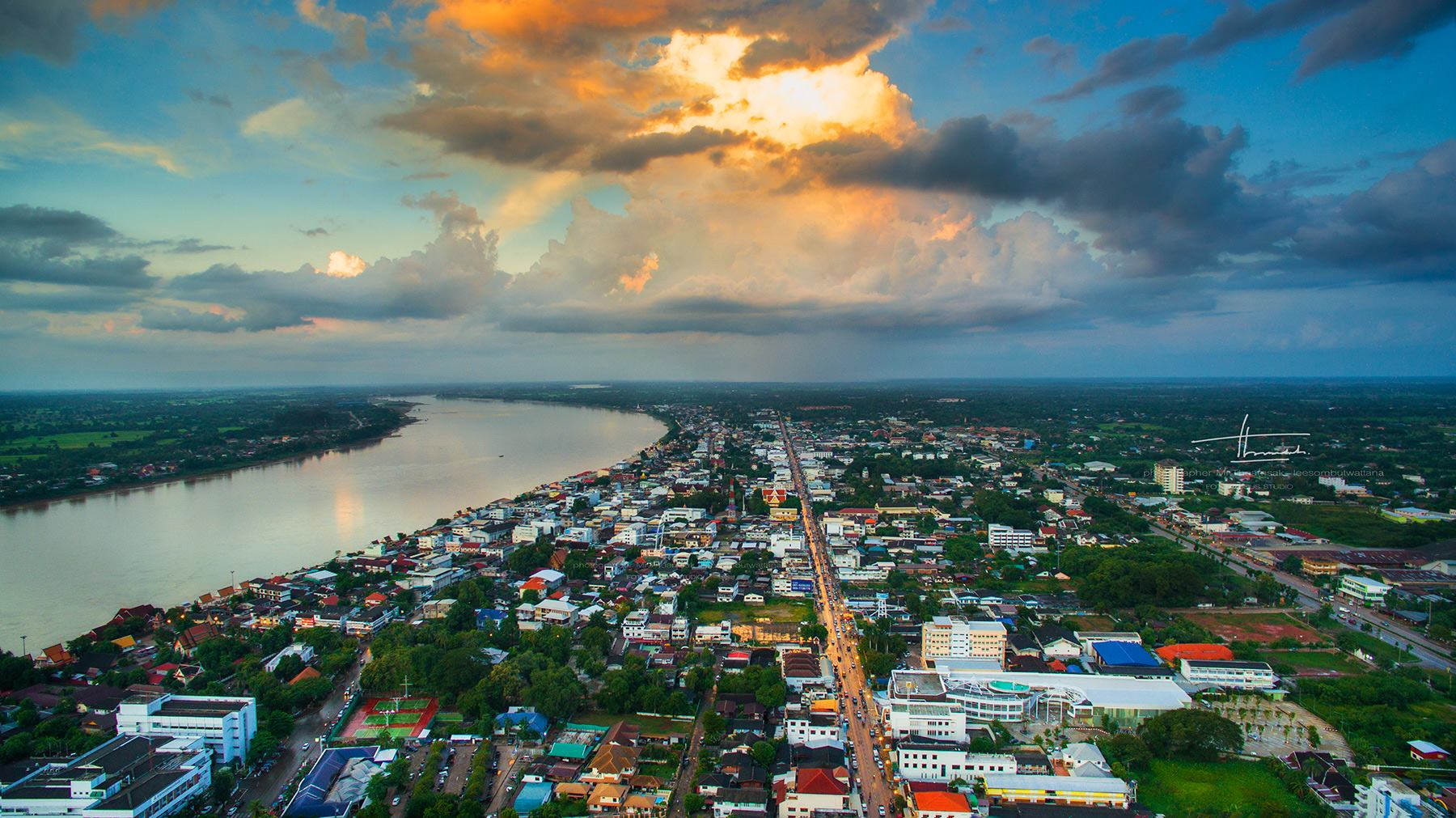
- Aerial view of Mueang Nong Khai

- District location in Nong Khai province
- Coordinates: 17°52′48″N 102°44′30″E
- Country: Thailand
- Province: Nong Khai
- Seat: Nong Kom Ko

Area
  - Total: 607.5 km^{2} (234.6 sq mi)

Population (2008)
  - Total: 145,153
  - Density: 235.1/km^{2} (609/sq mi)
- Time zone: UTC+7 (ICT)
- Postal code: 43000
- Geocode: 4301

Mueang Nong Khai (Thai: เมืองหนองคาย, pronounced [mɯ̄a̯ŋ nɔ̌ːŋ kʰāːj]) is the capital district (amphoe mueang) of Nong Khai province, northeastern Thailand.

== Geography ==
Neighboring districts are (from the east clockwise): Phon Phisai of Nong Khai Province, Phen of Udon Thani province, Sakhrai and Tha Bo of Nong Khai Province. To the north across the Mekong River is the Lao province Vientiane Prefecture.

The district is served by the Nong Khai railway station.

== Administration ==
The district is divided into 16 sub-districts (tambons), which are further subdivided into 181 villages (mubans). The town (thesaban mueang) Nong Khai covers the tambons Nai Mueang, Michais, and parts of the tambons Pho Chai, Khun Wan, Hat Kham, Nong Kom Ko, and Mueang Mi. There are two sub-district municipalities (thesaban tambons): Nong Song Hong covers parts of tambon Khai Bok Wan, and Wiang Khuk covers parts of the same-named tambon. There are a further 14 tambon administrative organizations (TAO).

No.	Name	Thai	Villages	Pop.
1.	Nai Mueang	ในเมือง	17	19,866
2.	Mi Chai	มีชัย	9	6,679
3.	Pho Chai	โพธิ์ชัย	12	15,152
4.	Kuan Wan	กวนวัน	7	5,458
5.	Wiang Khuk	เวียงคุก	8	6,274
6.	Wat That	วัดธาตุ	14	9,271
7.	Hat Kham	หาดคำ	16	15,692
8.	Hin Ngom	หินโงม	8	4,197
9.	Ban Duea	บ้านเดื่อ	16	7,183
10.	Khai Bok Wan	ค่ายบกหวาน	16	13,924
11.	Phon Sawang	โพนสว่าง	10	6,004
13.	Phra That Bang Phuan	พระธาตุบังพวน	14	10,647
16.	Nong Kom Ko	หนองกอมเกาะ	12	11,005
17.	Pa Kho	ปะโค	7	5,927
18.	Mueang Mi	เมืองหมี	7	4,384
19.	Si Kai	สีกาย	8	3,490

Missing numbers are tambons which now form Sakhrai District.
