= Si Chiang Mai district =

Si Chiang Mai ศรีเชียงใหม่
- District
- District location in Nong Khai province
- Coordinates: 17°57′23″N 102°35′22″E
- Country: Thailand
- Province: Nong Khai

Area
  - Total: 198.0 km^{2} (76.4 sq mi)

Population (2014)
  - Total: 30,687
  - Density: 157.2/km^{2} (407/sq mi)
- Time zone: UTC+7 (ICT)
- Postal code: 43130
- Geocode: 4307

Si Chiang Mai (Thai: ศรีเชียงใหม่, pronounced [sǐː t͡ɕʰīa̯ŋ màj]) is a district (amphoe) in the western part of Nong Khai province, northeastern Thailand. It may also be spelled Sri Chiang Mai.

== History ==
Si Chiang Mai district was established by King Setthathirath of Lan Xang Kingdom. It was named after Chiang Mai, the hometown of his grandmother, the former queen of Chiang Mai (his mother was the princess from Lan Na). It was created as a district of Nong Khai Province on 4 August 1958, when it was split off from Tha Bo district.

== Geography ==
Si Chiang Mai is bordered by the following districts of Nong Khai Province: Tha Bo, Pho Tak, and Sangkhom of Nong Khai Province. To the north across the Mekong River is the Lao province Vientiane Prefecture. A basalt plateau is flanked by the Mekong River to the north.

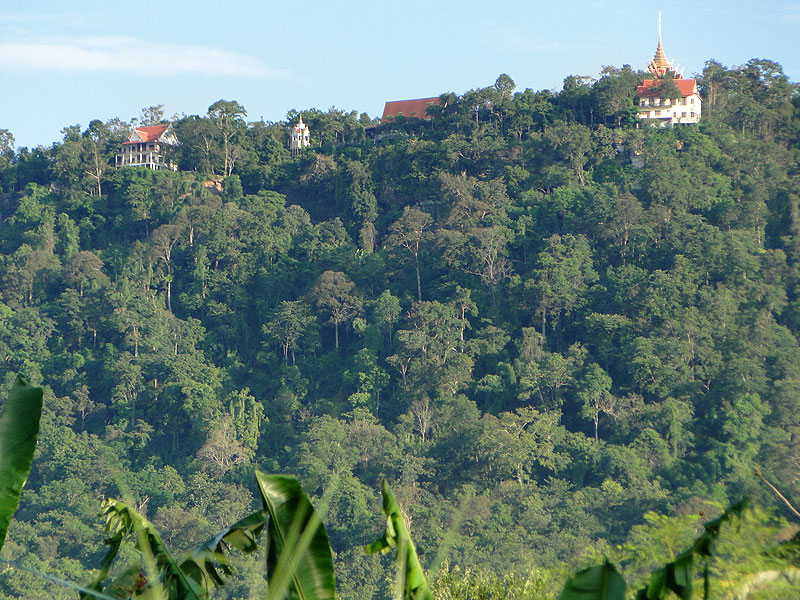
Pha Tak Suea, Si Chiang Mai Plateau

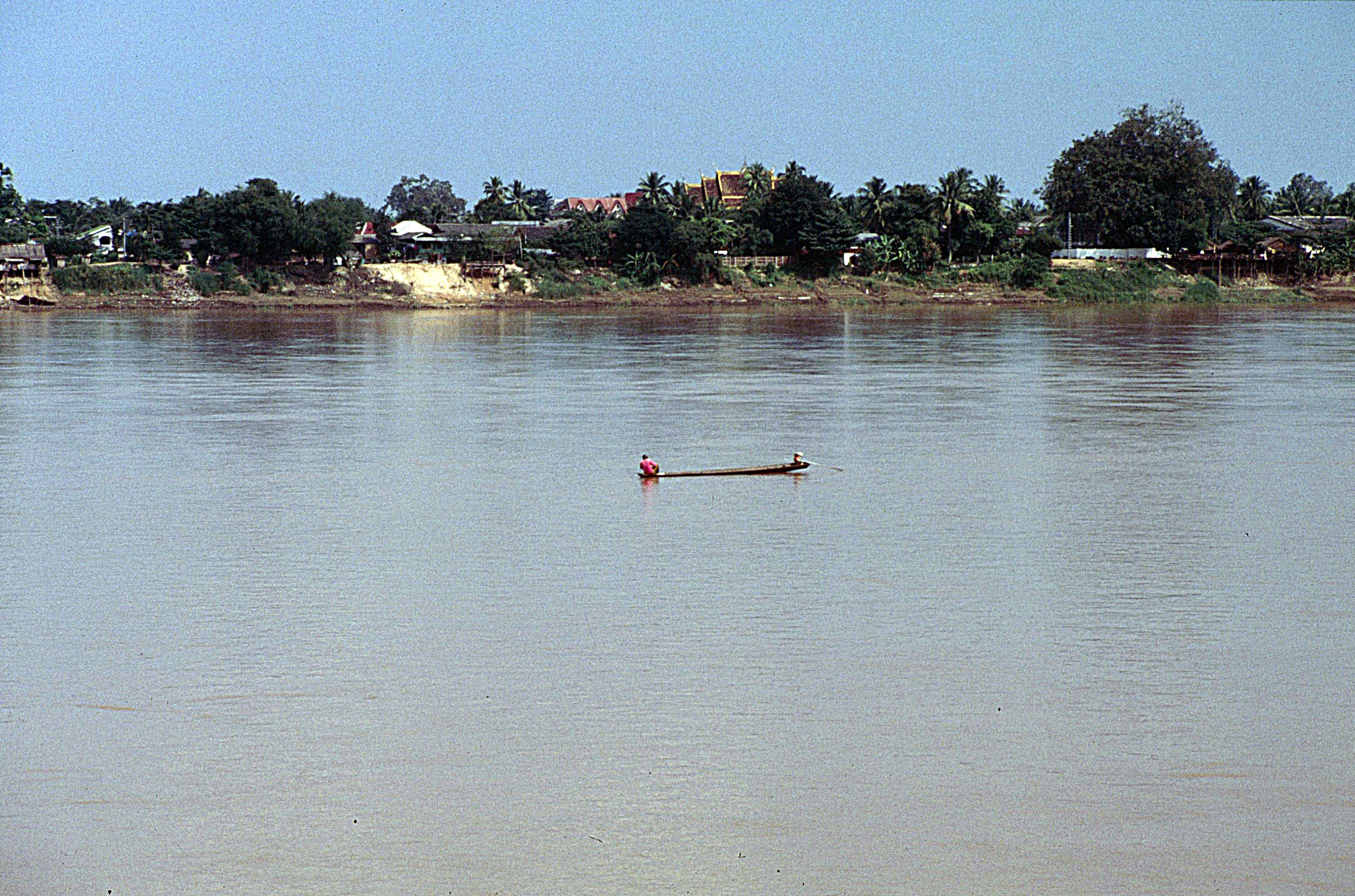
View of Vientiane from Si Chiang Mai District, Nong Khai, Thailand across the Mekong.

== Administration ==
=== Central administration ===
Si Chiang Mai is divided into four sub-districts (tambons), which are further subdivided into 43 administrative villages (mubans).

No.	Name	Thai	Villages	Pop.
1.	Phan Phrao	พานพร้าว	15	13,436
3.	Ban Mo	บ้านหม้อ	8	4,368
4.	Phra Phutthabat	พระพุทธบาท	10	5,041
5.	Nong Pla Pak	หนองปลาปาก	10	7,842

The missing number is a tambon which now forms Pho Tak District.

=== Local administration ===
There are two sub-district municipalities (thesaban tambons) in the district:

- Si Chiang Mai (Thai: เทศบาลตำบลศรีเชียงใหม่) consisting of parts of sub-district Phan Phrao.
- Nong Pla Pak (Thai: เทศบาลตำบลหนองปลาปาก) consisting of sub-district Nong Pla Pak.

There are three sub-district administrative organizations (SAO) in the district:

- Phan Phrao (Thai: องค์การบริหารส่วนตำบลพานพร้าว) consisting of parts of sub-district Phan Phrao.
- Ban Mo (Thai: องค์การบริหารส่วนตำบลบ้านหม้อ) consisting of sub-district Ban Mo.
- Phra Phutthabat (Thai: องค์การบริหารส่วนตำบลพระพุทธบาท) consisting of sub-district Phra Phutthabat.
