= Tha Bo district =

Tha Bo ท่าบ่อ
- District
- District location in Nong Khai province
- Coordinates: 17°50′59″N 102°34′52″E
- Country: Thailand
- Province: Nong Khai

Area
  - Total: 355.3 km^{2} (137.2 sq mi)

Population (2005)
  - Total: 84,708
  - Density: 238.4/km^{2} (617/sq mi)
- Time zone: UTC+7 (ICT)
- Postal code: 43110
- Geocode: 4302

Tha Bo (Thai: ท่าบ่อ, pronounced [tʰâː bɔ̀ː]; Northeastern Thai: ท่าบ่อ, pronounced [tʰāː bɔ́ː]) is a district (amphoe) in the western part of Nong Khai province, northeastern Thailand.

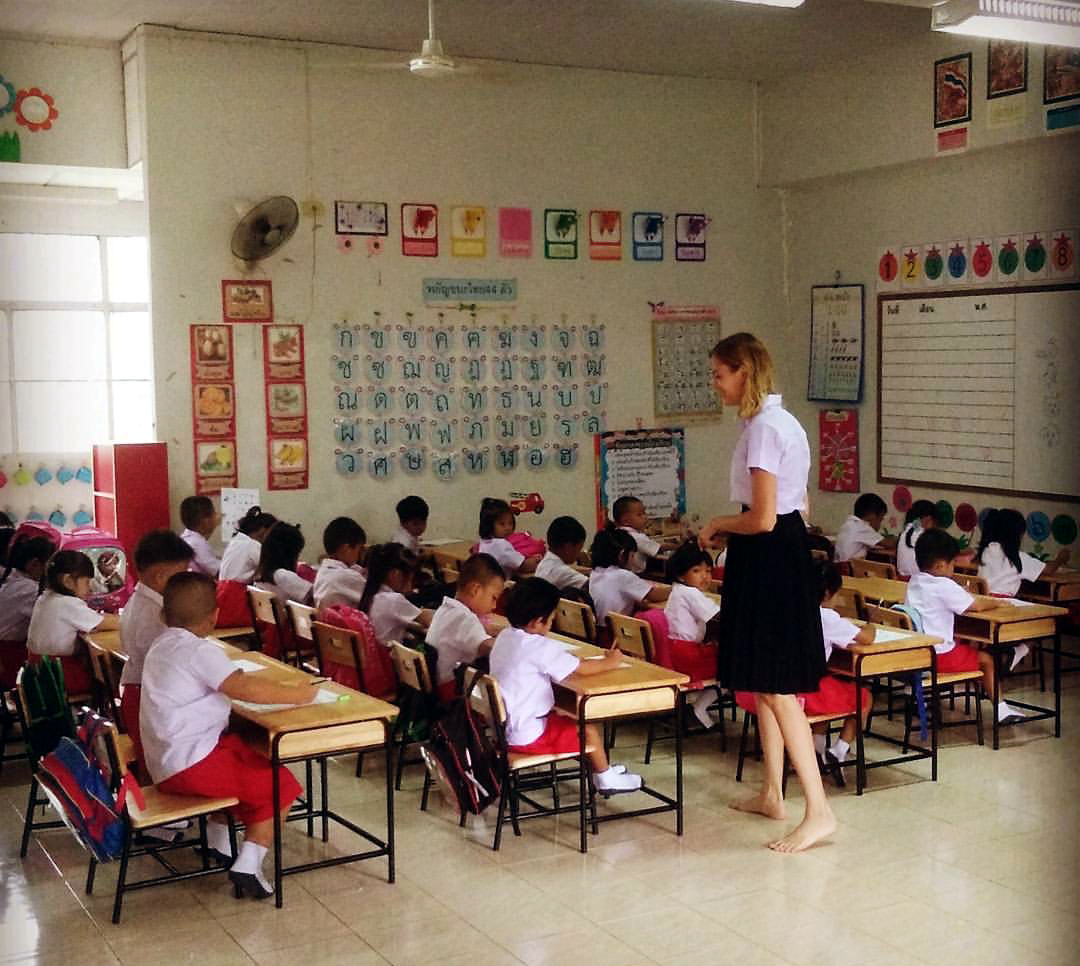
Kindergarten students learning English, Tha Bo

== Geography ==
Neighboring districts are (from the east clockwise): Mueang Nong Khai and Sa Khrai of Nong Khai Province; Ban Phue of Udon Thani province; Pho Tak and Si Chiang Mai of Nong Khai Province. To the northeast across the Mekong river is the Lao province Vientiane Prefecture.

== History ==
The district dates back to the Mueang Tha Bo established in 1897, with Phra Kupradit Padi (พระกุประดิษฐ์บดี) as the first governor (Chao Mueang).

== Environment ==
The air quality in Tha Bo in 2018 was the third worst in Thailand after Samut Sakhon and Khorat.

== Administration ==
The district is divided into 10 sub-districts (tambons), which are further subdivided into 98 villages (mubans). There are two townships (thesaban tambons): Tha Bo covers parts of tambons Tha Bo and Nam Mong, and Phon Sa covers parts of tambon Phon Sa. There are a further 10 tambon administrative organizations (TAO).

No.	Name	Thai name	Villages	Pop.
1.	Tha Bo	ท่าบ่อ	13	20,872
2.	Nam Mong	น้ำโมง	13	9,483
3.	Kong Nang	กองนาง	13	9,385
4.	Khok Khon	โคกคอน	7	6,007
5.	Ban Duea	บ้านเดื่อ	9	7,608
6.	Ban Thon	บ้านถ่อน	8	6,461
7.	Ban Wan	บ้านว่าน	8	7,330
8.	Na Kha	นาข่า	8	4,482
9.	Phon Sa	โพนสา	10	7,193
10.	Nong Nang	หนองนาง	9	5,887
