= Pho Tak district =

Pho Tak โพธิ์ตาก
- District
- District location in Nong Khai province
- Coordinates: 17°52′36″N 102°24′36″E
- Country: Thailand
- Province: Nong Khai
- Seat: Pho Tak

Area
  - Total: 102.5 km^{2} (39.6 sq mi)

Population (2005)
  - Total: 14,886
  - Density: 145.2/km^{2} (376/sq mi)
- Time zone: UTC+7 (ICT)
- Postal code: 43130
- Geocode: 4317

Pho Tak (Thai: โพธิ์ตาก, pronounced [pʰōː tàːk]) is a district (amphoe) of Nong Khai province, northeastern Thailand.

== Geography ==
Neighboring districts are (from the west clockwise): Sangkhom, Si Chiang Mai, and Tha Bo of Nong Khai Province, and Ban Phue of Udon Thani province.

== History ==
The minor district (king amphoe) was created on 1 July 1997 by splitting off the three tambons, Pho Tak, Phon Thong, and Dan Si Suk, from Si Chiang Mai district.

On 15 May 2007, all 81 minor districts were upgraded to full districts. With publication in the Royal Gazette on 24 August, the upgrade became official.

== Administration ==
The district is divided into three sub-districts (tambons), which are further subdivided into 27 villages (mubans). There are no municipal (thesaban) areas. There are three tambon administrative organizations (TAO).

No.	Name	Thai name	Villages	Pop.
1.	Pho Tak	โพธิ์ตาก	7	4,208
2.	Phon Thong	โพนทอง	11	6,441
3.	Dan Si Suk	ด่านศรีสุข	9	4,237
