= Nong Khai =

Coordinates: 17°52′5″N 102°44′40″E

Nong Khai หนองคาย
- Town
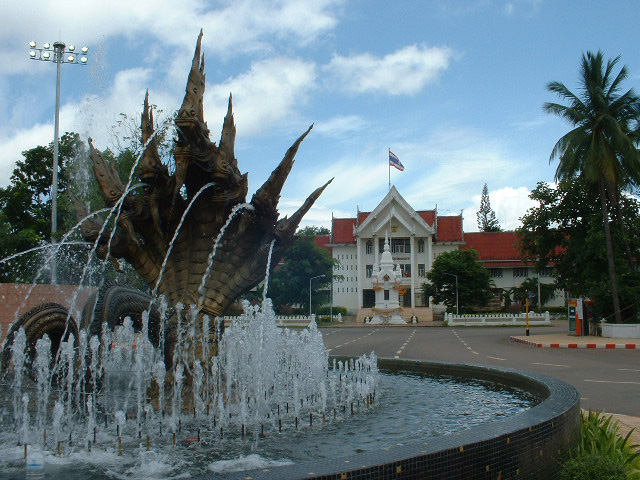
- Nong Khai Old City Hall, Nong Khai City

- Location in Nong Khai province
- Country: Thailand
- Province: Nong Khai province

Area
  - Total: 31.15 km^{2} (12.03 sq mi)

Population (2011)
  - Total: 46,180
  - Density: 1,483/km^{2} (3,840/sq mi)
- Time zone: UTC+7 (ICT)

Nong Khai (Thai: เทศบาลเมืองหนองคาย, RTGS: Thetsaban Mueang Nong Khai; Lao: ໜອງຄາຍ) is a city in northeast Thailand. It is the capital of Nong Khai province. Nong Khai city is located in Mueang Nong Khai district.

Nong Khai lies on the Mekong River, near the site of the First Thai–Lao Friendship Bridge, spanning the river to Laos. The bridge, a major tourist attraction, was largely funded as a gift to the Lao government from the Australian government. It is the road and railway gateway to the Lao capital, Vientiane, 25 kilometres (16 mi) upriver, on the north bank opposite Thailand's Si Chiang Mai district. Construction of a rail spur to Thanaleng outside Vientiane was begun early-2007 and opened 5 March 2009.

Nong Khai is 626 km (389 mi) north of Bangkok by road and 60 km (37 mi) north of Udon Thani.

== History ==
The Prap Ho Monument before the old city hall (now a museum and cultural center) memorialises the dead of the Haw wars.

Nong Khai has become a popular destination during the Buddhist Lent festival when mysterious balls of light, or Naga fireballs, rise from the Mekong River. The balls resemble an orange sun. They rise out of the river approximately 6–9 meters (20–30 ft) and disappear after three to five seconds. Although the fireballs can be seen at other times, most Thais travel to see them during the full moon in October when the incidence of them is considered to be much higher.

Nong Khai's main sight is Sala Keoku (alternatively spelled as Sala Kaew Ku, also known as Wat Khaek), a park of colossal sculptures, some over 20 m tall. The park is the handiwork of the mystic Luang Pu Bunleua Sulilat, who bought the land in 1978 when he was exiled from his native Laos, where he had built a similar park in Vientiane in the 1950s. Synthesizing Buddhist and Hinduist ideologies, Buddhas, many-armed goddesses, a seven-headed Naga snake, and various human-animal hybrids dominate the site.

Notable figures from twentieth century Buddhist history have lived in Nong Khai – the world renowned Buddhist scholar and leading meditation teacher Ajahn Sumedho was ordained in Wat Sisaket in Nong Khai.

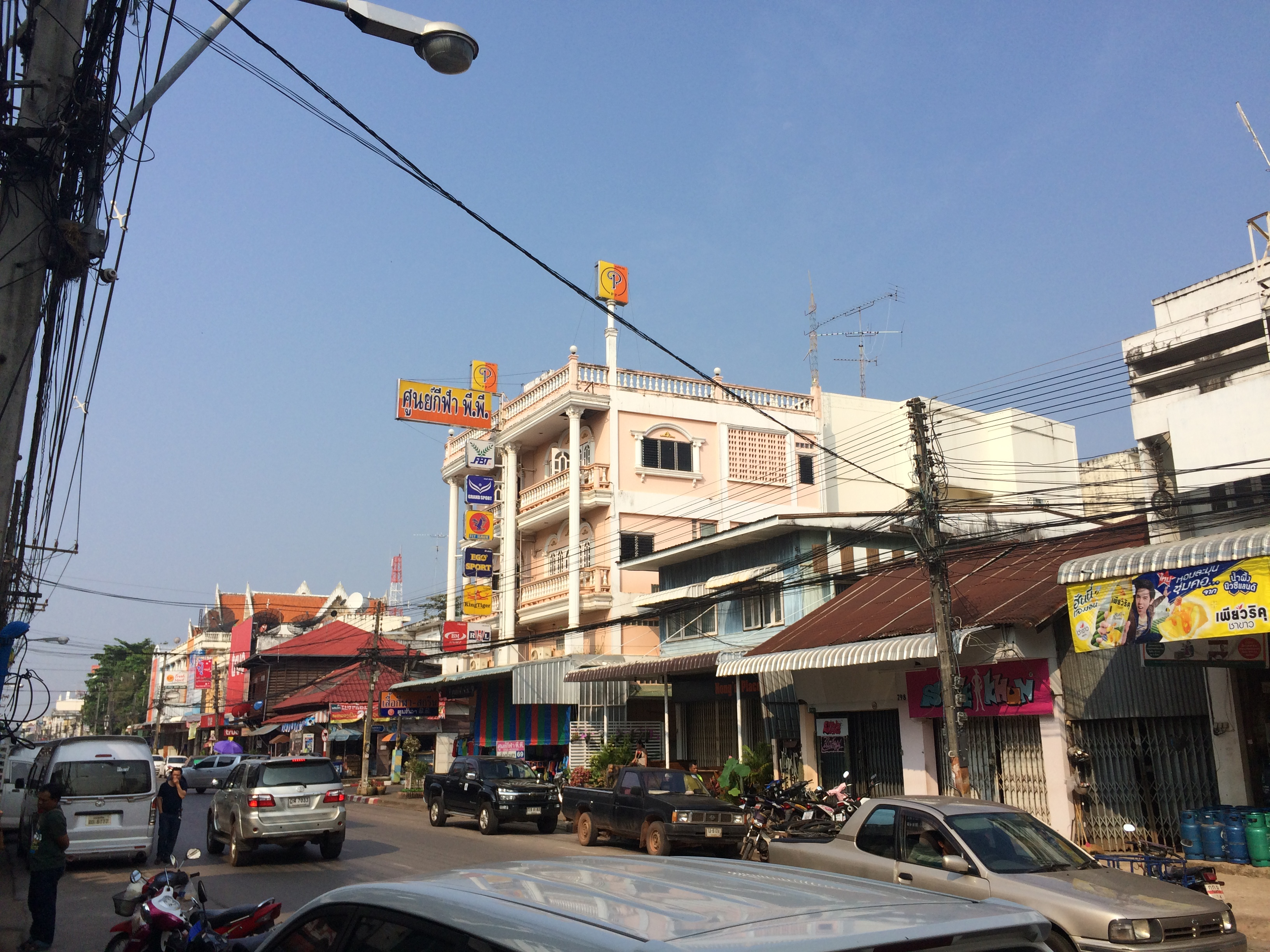
Streets of Nong Khai, provincial capital of Nong Khai Province.

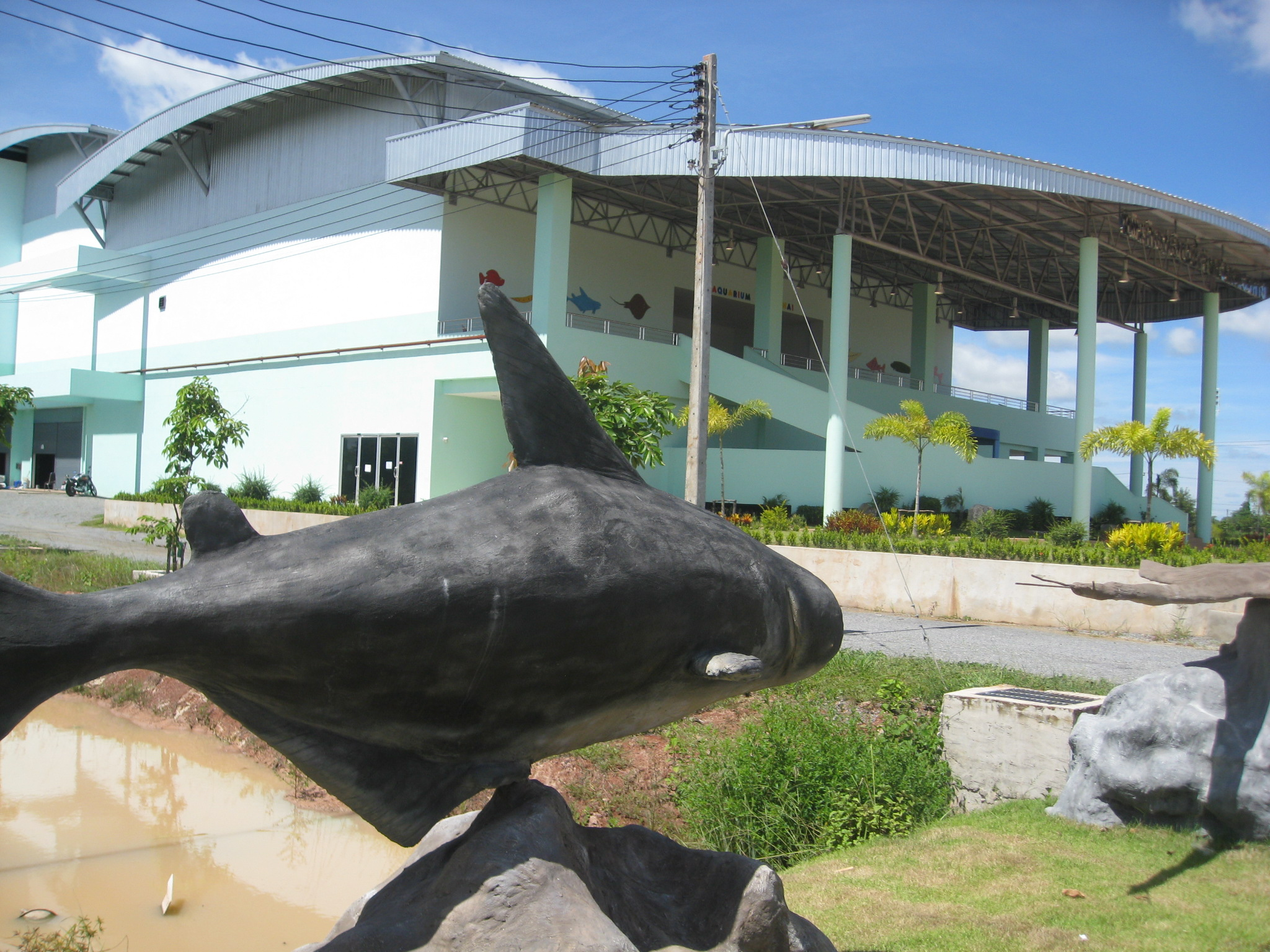
Nong Khai Aquarium

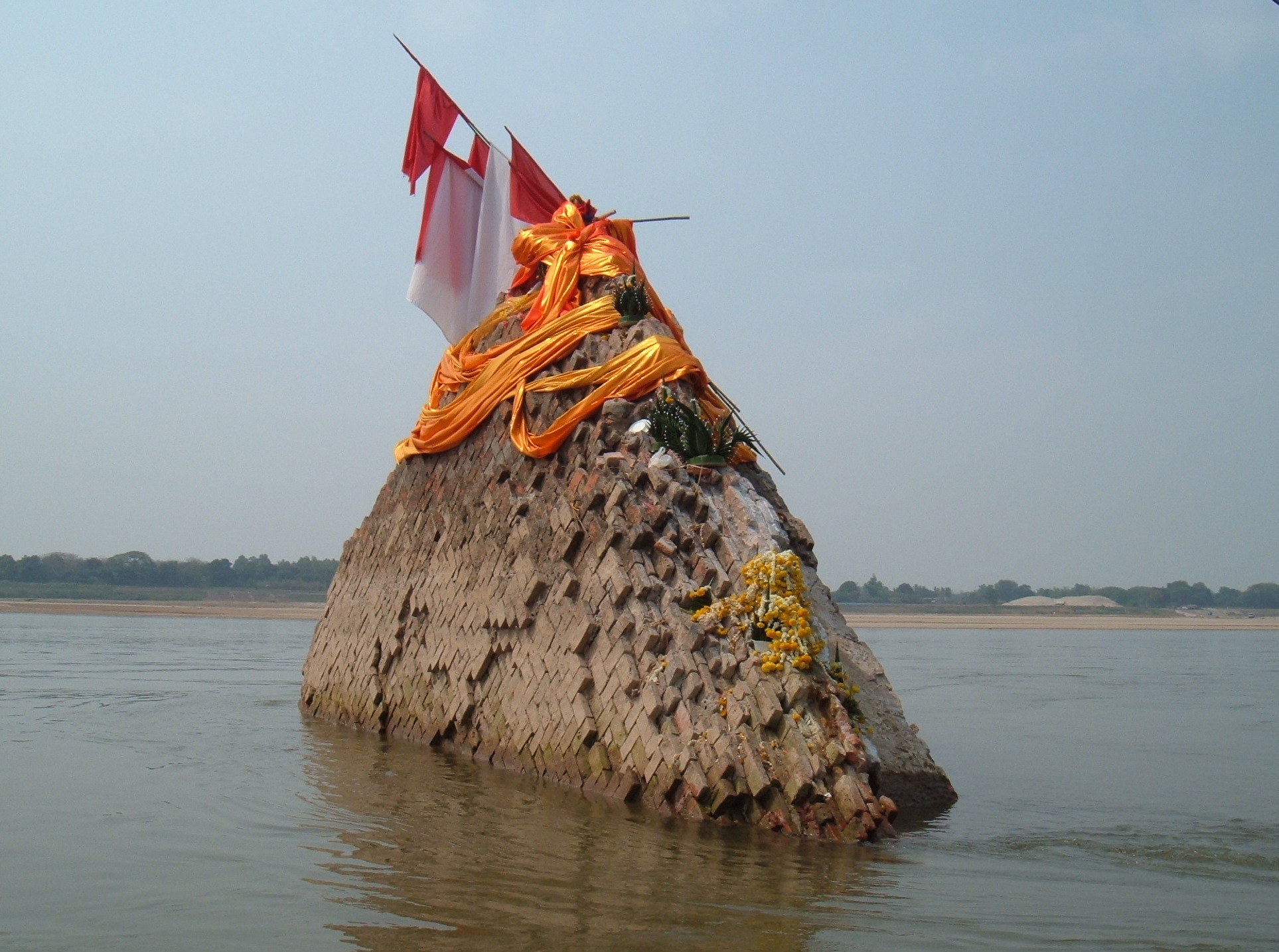
Phrathat Nong Khai

== Climate ==
The area has a tropical savanna climate (Köppen: Aw).

Climate data for Nong Khai (1991–2020, extremes 1968-present)
Month	Jan	Feb	Mar	Apr	May	Jun	Jul	Aug	Sep	Oct	Nov	Dec	Year
Record high °C (°F)	41.3 (106.3)	42.1 (107.8)	42.8 (109.0)	45.3 (113.5)	46.7 (116.1)	44.5 (112.1)	43.9 (111.0)	40.5 (104.9)	39.7 (103.5)	38.7 (101.7)	39.6 (103.3)	38.8 (101.8)	50.7 (123.3)
Mean daily maximum °C (°F)	29.8 (85.6)	32.1 (89.8)	34.7 (94.5)	36.3 (97.3)	34.7 (94.5)	33.4 (92.1)	32.6 (90.7)	32.1 (89.8)	32.2 (90.0)	32.2 (90.0)	31.3 (88.3)	29.4 (84.9)	32.6 (90.6)
Daily mean °C (°F)	23.0 (73.4)	25.0 (77.0)	27.9 (82.2)	29.7 (85.5)	29.0 (84.2)	28.6 (83.5)	28.1 (82.6)	27.7 (81.9)	27.8 (82.0)	27.2 (81.0)	25.3 (77.5)	22.9 (73.2)	26.9 (80.3)
Mean daily minimum °C (°F)	17.3 (63.1)	19.1 (66.4)	22.2 (72.0)	24.5 (76.1)	24.9 (76.8)	25.1 (77.2)	24.9 (76.8)	24.6 (76.3)	24.4 (75.9)	23.2 (73.8)	20.4 (68.7)	17.5 (63.5)	22.3 (72.2)
Record low °C (°F)	5.2 (41.4)	9.1 (48.4)	10.2 (50.4)	15.7 (60.3)	20.0 (68.0)	20.9 (69.6)	19.8 (67.6)	21.0 (69.8)	20.5 (68.9)	14.2 (57.6)	8.8 (47.8)	4.9 (40.8)	4.9 (40.8)
Average precipitation mm (inches)	10.6 (0.42)	18.3 (0.72)	43.8 (1.72)	83.9 (3.30)	232.1 (9.14)	252.7 (9.95)	321.9 (12.67)	346.5 (13.64)	268.8 (10.58)	88.4 (3.48)	15.6 (0.61)	8.2 (0.32)	1,690.8 (66.57)
Average precipitation days (≥ 1.0 mm)	1.1	1.6	3.9	6.2	13.5	15.7	18.0	18.9	14.5	5.6	1.4	0.6	101
Average relative humidity (%)	68.4	65.0	64.2	66.6	76.3	81.1	83.3	84.6	82.8	75.7	69.9	68.1	73.8
Mean monthly sunshine hours	257.3	243.0	275.9	204.0	158.1	117.0	120.9	117.8	144.0	198.4	216.0	257.3	2,309.7
Source 1: World Meteorological Organization
Source 2: Office of Water Management and Hydrology, Royal Irrigation Department (sun 1981–2010)(extremes)
