= Nong Khai province =

Coordinates: 17°52′5″N 102°44′40″E

Nong Khai หนองคาย
- Province
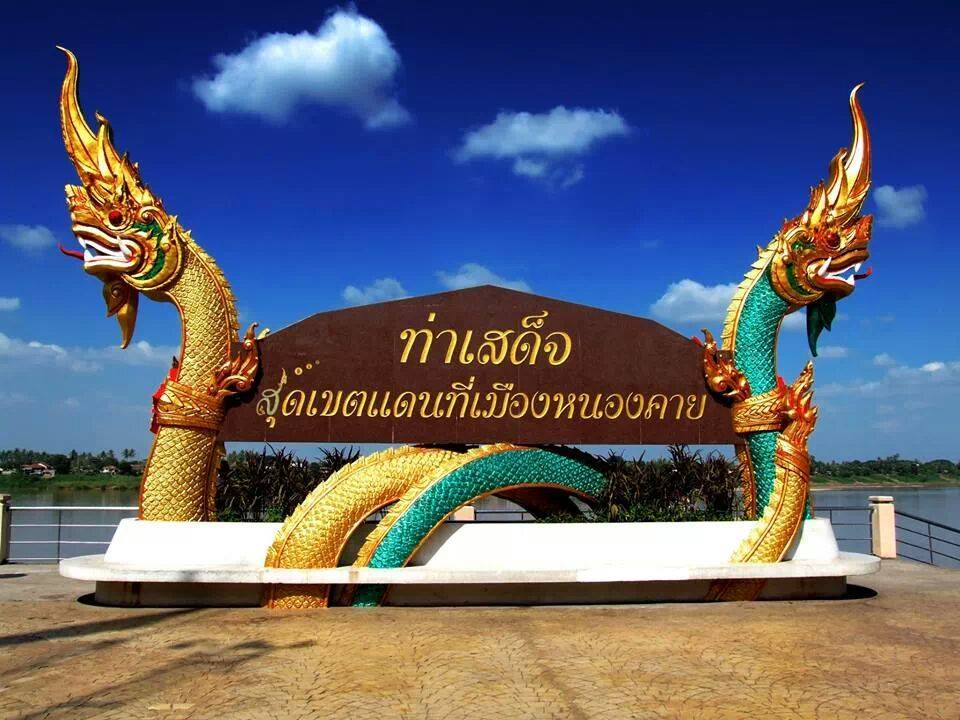
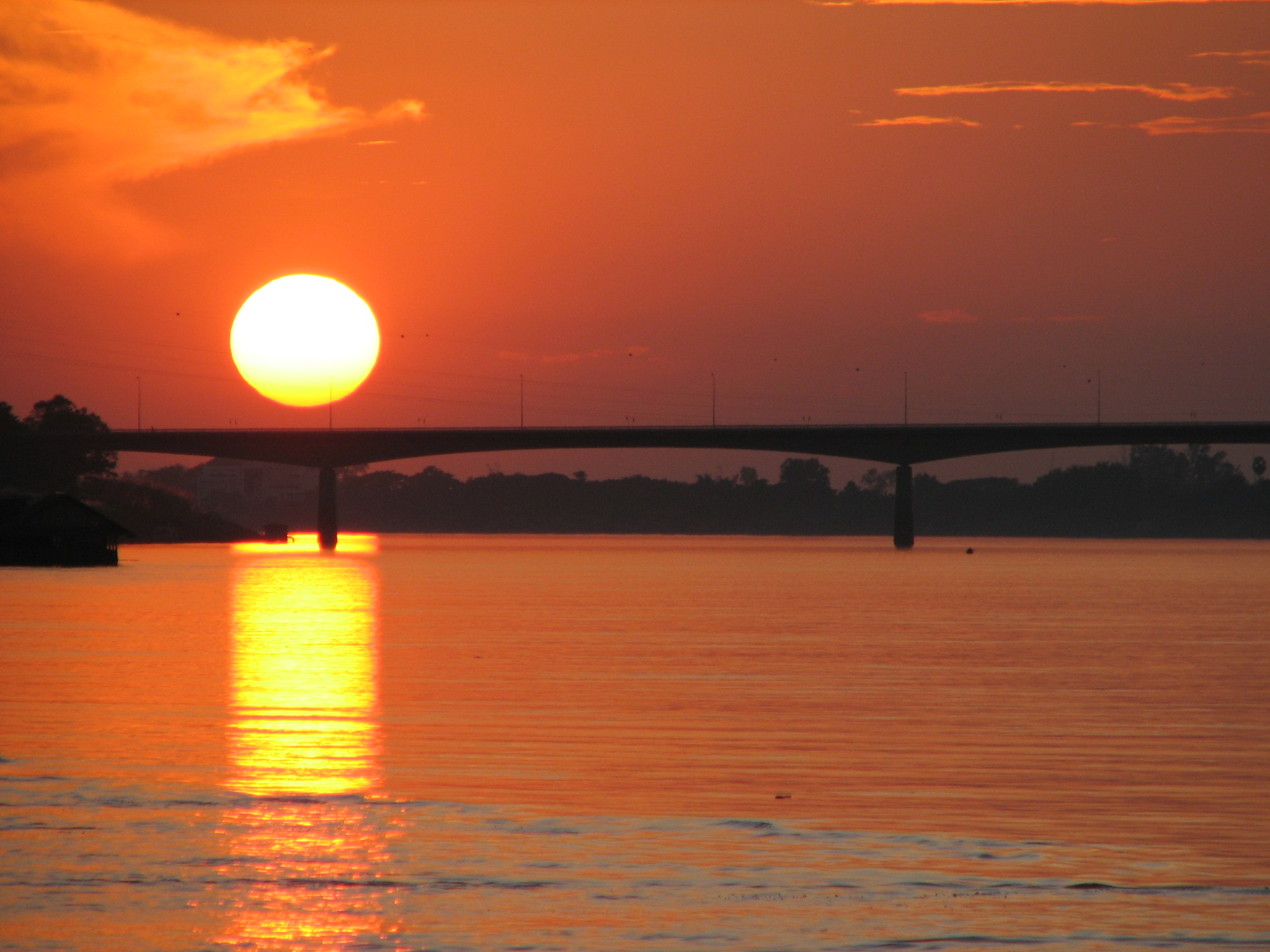
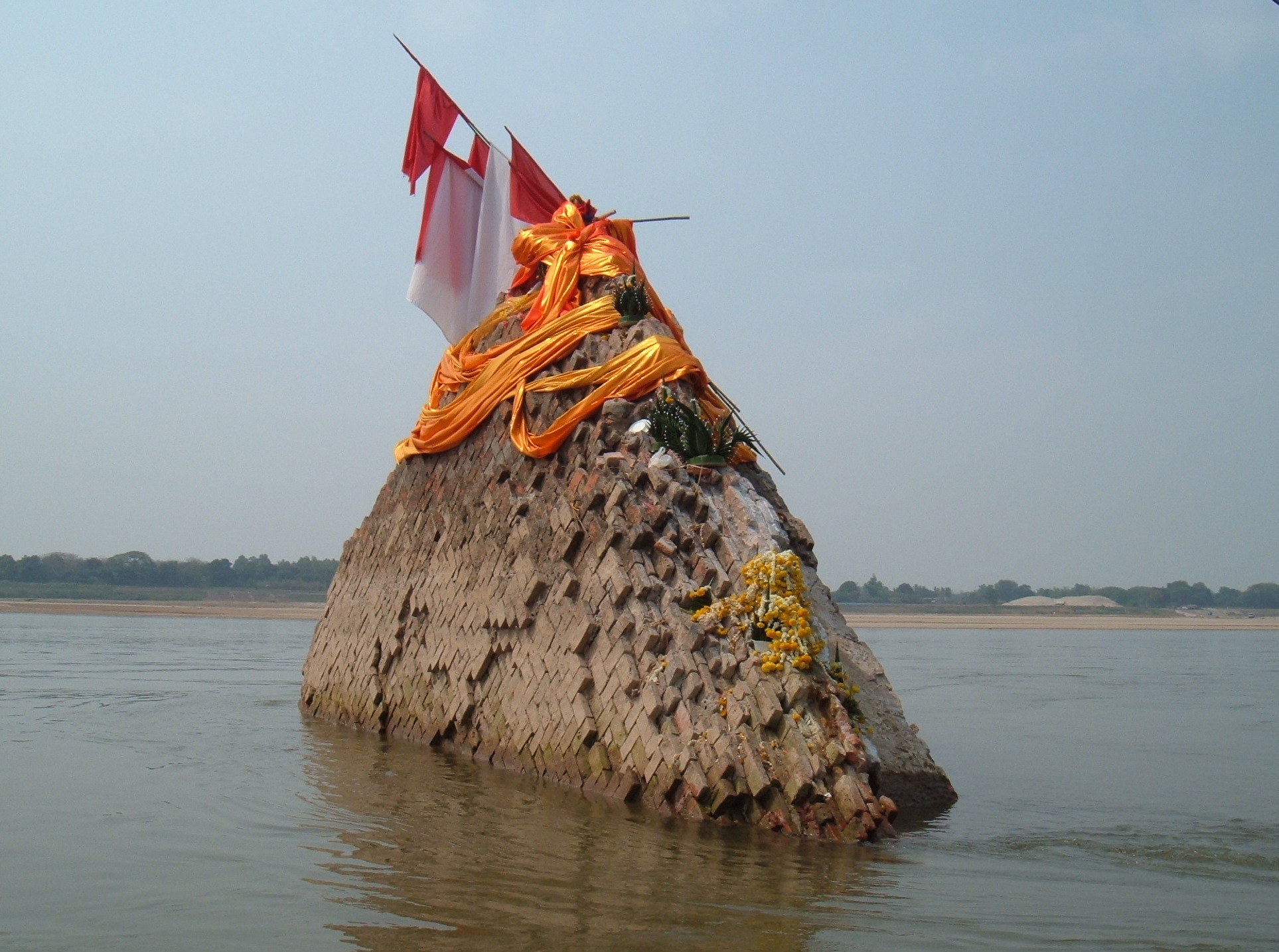
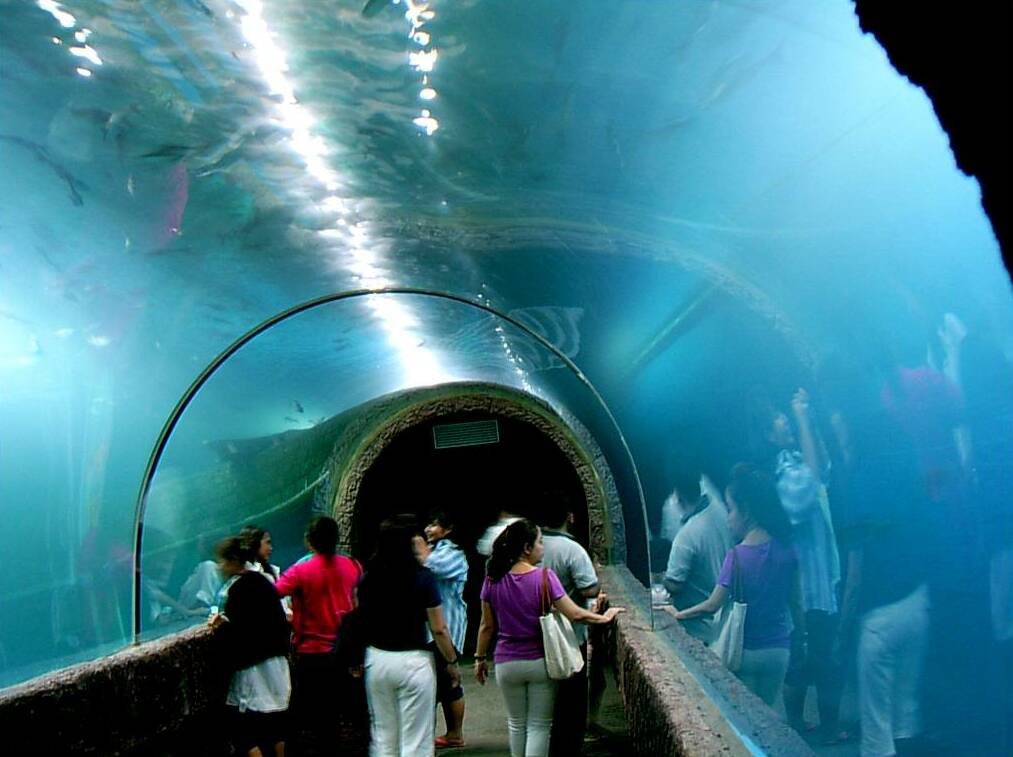
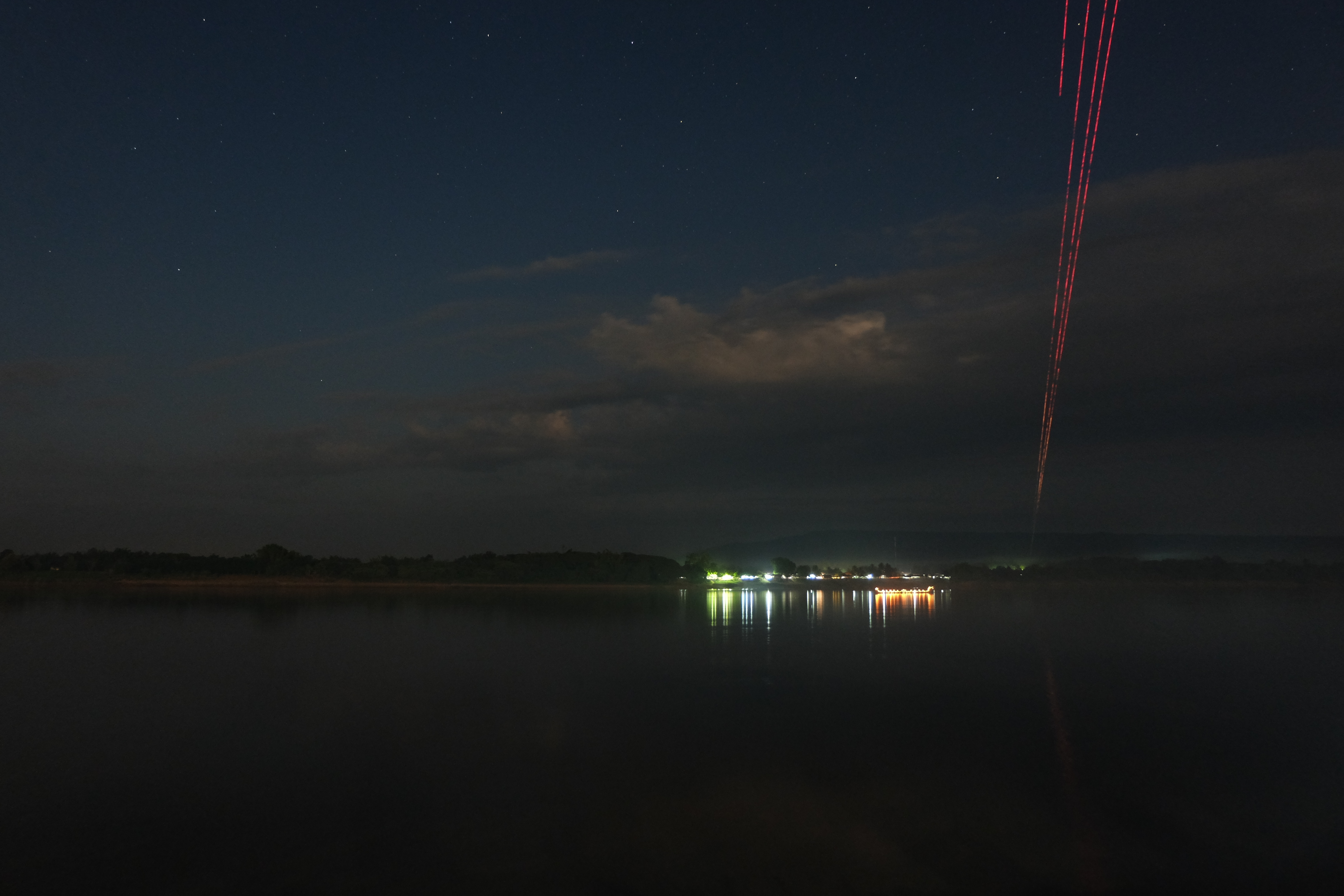
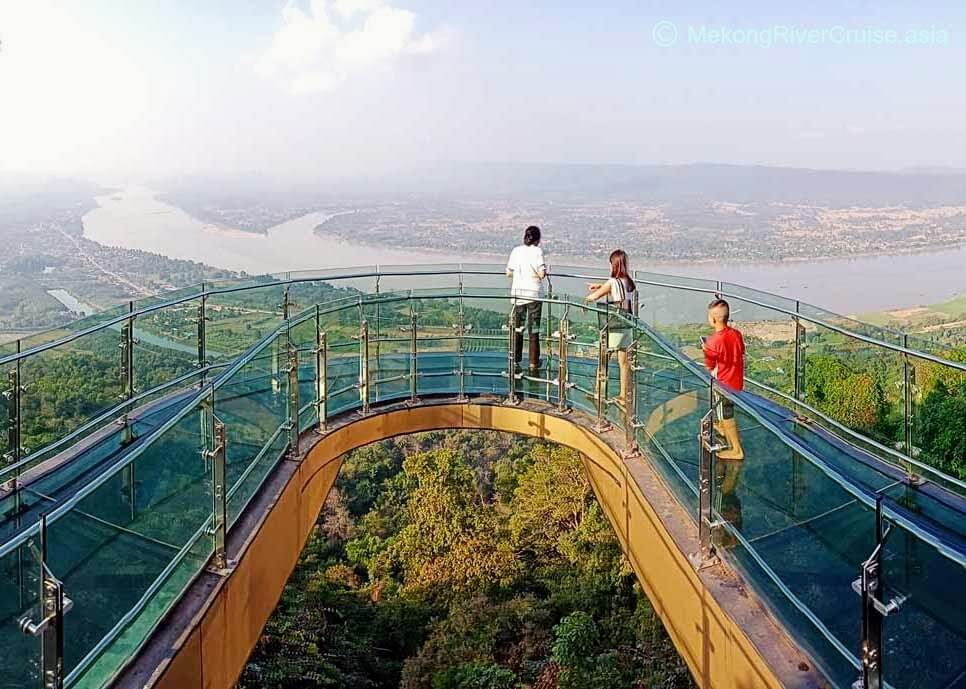
- From top: Phaya Naga Plaza, a landmark of Tha Sadet, a Mekong riverside border market; Silhouette of the First Thai–Lao Friendship Bridge; Phrathat Nong Khai, a pagoda sunken in the Mekong; Inside of Nong Khai Aquarium; Naga fireballs phenomena in 2015; Glass Skywalk viewpoint of the Mekong in Sangkhom District

- Flag Seal
- Mottoes: วีรกรรมปราบฮ่อ หลวงพ่อพระใส สะพานไทย-ลาว ("The Haw wars. Luang Pho Phra Sai. The Thai-Lao bridge.")
- Map of Thailand highlighting Nong Khai province
- Country: Thailand
- Capital: Nong Khai

Government
  - Type: Province and Provincial Administrative Organization
  - Body: Nong Khai Province and Nong Khai Provincial Administrative Organization
  - Governor: Sompop Samittasiri
  - PAO Chief Executive: Wutthikrai Changlek

Area
  - Total: 3,275 km^{2} (1,264 sq mi)
  - Rank: 60th

Population (2024)
  - Total: ▼511,706
  - Rank: 52nd
  - Density: 156/km^{2} (400/sq mi)
  - Rank: 23rd

Human Achievement Index
  - HAI (2022): 0.6357 "somewhat low" Ranked 46th

GDP
  - Total: baht 40 billion (US$1.4 billion) (2019)
- Time zone: UTC+7 (ICT)
- Postal code: 43xxx
- Calling code: 042
- ISO 3166 code: TH-43
- Website: nongkhai.go.th nongkhaipao.go.th

Nong Khai province (Thai: หนองคาย, pronounced [nɔ̌ːŋ kʰāːj]; Northeastern Thai: หนองคาย, pronounced [nɔ̌ːŋ kʰa᷇ːj]) was formerly the northernmost of the northeastern (Isan) provinces (changwat) of Thailand until its eight eastern districts were split off to form Thailand's newest province, Bueng Kan province, in 2011. Nong Khai province lies in upper northeastern Thailand. Nearby provinces are (clockwise, from the east): Bueng Kan, Sakon Nakhon, Udon Thani, and Loei. To the north it borders Vientiane province, Vientiane Prefecture, and Bolikhamsai province of Laos.

== Geography ==
The province is in the valley of the Mae Nam Kong (Mekong River), which also forms the border with Laos. There are highlands to the south. The total forest area is 233 km^{2} (90 sq mi) or 7.1 percent of provincial area. The Laotian capital, Vientiane, is only 25 kilometers (16 mi) from the provincial capital of Nong Khai. The First Thai–Lao Friendship Bridge, which connects the two countries, was built jointly by the governments of Thailand, Laos, and Australia, and was opened in 1994.

Nong Khai is the smallest province in the northeastern after Bueng Kan and other seven districts became Bueng Kan province in 2011.

== History ==
Over the centuries, control of the province swung between the Thai Kingdom Ayutthaya, and the Laotian kingdom Lan Xang, as their respective powers ebbed and flowed in the region.

The Prap Ho Monument in front of the historic city hall (now a museum and cultural center) memorializes the war dead of the Haw wars.

In more recent years, Nong Khai has become a popular destination during the Buddhist Lent festival when mysterious balls of light, or Naga fireballs, rise from the Mekong River. The balls resemble an orange sun. They rise out of the river approximately 6–9 meters (20–30 feet) and disappear after three to five seconds. Although the fireballs can be seen at other times, most Thais travel to see them during the full moon in October when the incidence of them is considered to be much higher.

Nong Khai's main sight is Sala Keoku (alternatively spelled as Sala Kaew Ku, also known as Wat Khaek), a park of colossal sculptures, some over 20 m tall. The park is the handiwork of the mystic Luang Pu Bunleua Sulilat, who bought the land in 1978 when he was exiled from his native Laos, where he had built a similar park in Vientiane in the 1950s. Synthesizing Buddhist and Hinduist ideologies, Buddhas, many-armed goddesses, a seven-headed Naga snake, and various human-animal hybrids dominate the site.

Notable figures from twentieth century Buddhist history have lived in Nong Khai—the world renowned Buddhist scholar and leading meditation teacher Ajahn Sumedho ordained in Wat Sisaket in Nong Khai.

== Symbols ==
The provincial seal shows a pond with a bamboo clump close to it. The bamboo symbolizes stability, glory, and continuity for the peaceful and fertile land.

The provincial tree is the tamalan or Burma pallisander (Dalbergia oliveri).

The provincial aquatic life is the seven-striped barb or Jullien's golden carp (Probarbus jullieni).

== Administrative divisions ==
=== Provincial government ===
As of 23 March 2011, the province is divided into nine districts (amphoes). The districts are further divided into 62 subdistricts (tambons) and 705 villages (mubans). The eight districts of Bueng Kan were districts of Nong Khai before they were split off to form Bueng Kan province.

Map of 9 districts

1. Mueang Nong Khai
2. Tha Bo
3. Phon Phisai
4. Si Chiang Mai
5. Sangkhom
6. Sakhrai
7. Fao Rai
8. Rattanawapi
9. Pho Tak

=== Local government ===
As of 26 November 2019 there are: one Nong Khai Provincial Administration Organisation (ongkan borihan suan changwat) and 19 municipal (thesaban) areas in the province. Nong Khai and Tha Bo have town (thesaban mueang) status. Further 17 subdistrict municipalities (thesaban tambon). The non-municipal areas are administered by 48 Subdistrict Administrative Organisations - SAO (ongkan borihan suan tambon).

== Economy ==
=== Economic output ===
In 2021, Nong Khai province had an economic output of 44.396 billion baht (US$1,168 billion). This amounts to per capita gross provincial product (GPP) of 97,617 baht (US$2,570). In 2023 the total labourforce was 223,746 of which 222,815 persons were employed in economic activity. In agriculture and fishing 106,834 persons (47.9%) were employed and in the non-agricultural sector 115,981 persons (52.1%).

Gross Provincial Product (GPP)
	Activities	Baht	Percent
1	Agriculture and fishing	10,065,000,000	22.7
2	Manufacturing	8,846,000,000	19.9
3	Education	6,316,000,000	14.2
4	Trade	4,924,000,000	11.1
5	Finance	2,980,000,000	6.7
6	Human health	2,203,000,000	5.0
7	Defence + publ.admin.	2,054,000,000	4.6
8	Real estate	1,800,000,000	4.0
9	Transportation	1,550,000,000	3.5
10	Construction	1,524,000,000	3.4
11	Energy	552,000,000	1.2
12	Information	447,000,000	1.0
13	Other service activity	431,000,000	1.0
14	Mining	261,000,000	0.6
15	Hotel and restaurant	146,000,000	0.3
16	Pastime	130,000,000	0.3
17	Water supply	118,000,000	0.3
18	Administration	26,000,000	0.1
19	Scientific activity	23,000,000	0.1
	Total	44,396,000,000	100

Employed persons
	Activities	Workforce	Percent
1	Agriculture and fishing	106,834	47.9
2	Trade	31,570	14.2
3	Construction	15,826	7.1
4	Hotel and restaurant	15,038	6.7
5	Manufacturing	13,834	6.2
6	Defence + publ.admin.	13,307	6.0
7	Education	7,751	3.5
8	Human health	5,994	2.7
9	Transportation	3,871	1.7
10	Finance	2,574	1.2
11	Other service activity	1,978	0.9
12	Scientific activity	1,636	0.7
13	Household enterprise	611	0.3
14	Administration	436	0.2
15	Energy and water supply	407	0.2
16	Real estate	381	0.2
17	Mining	321	0.1
18	Pastime	293	0.1
19	Information	153	0.1
	Total	222,815	100

== Transport ==
=== Air ===
The nearest airport is Udon Thani International Airport, 56 km from Nong Khai.

=== Rail ===
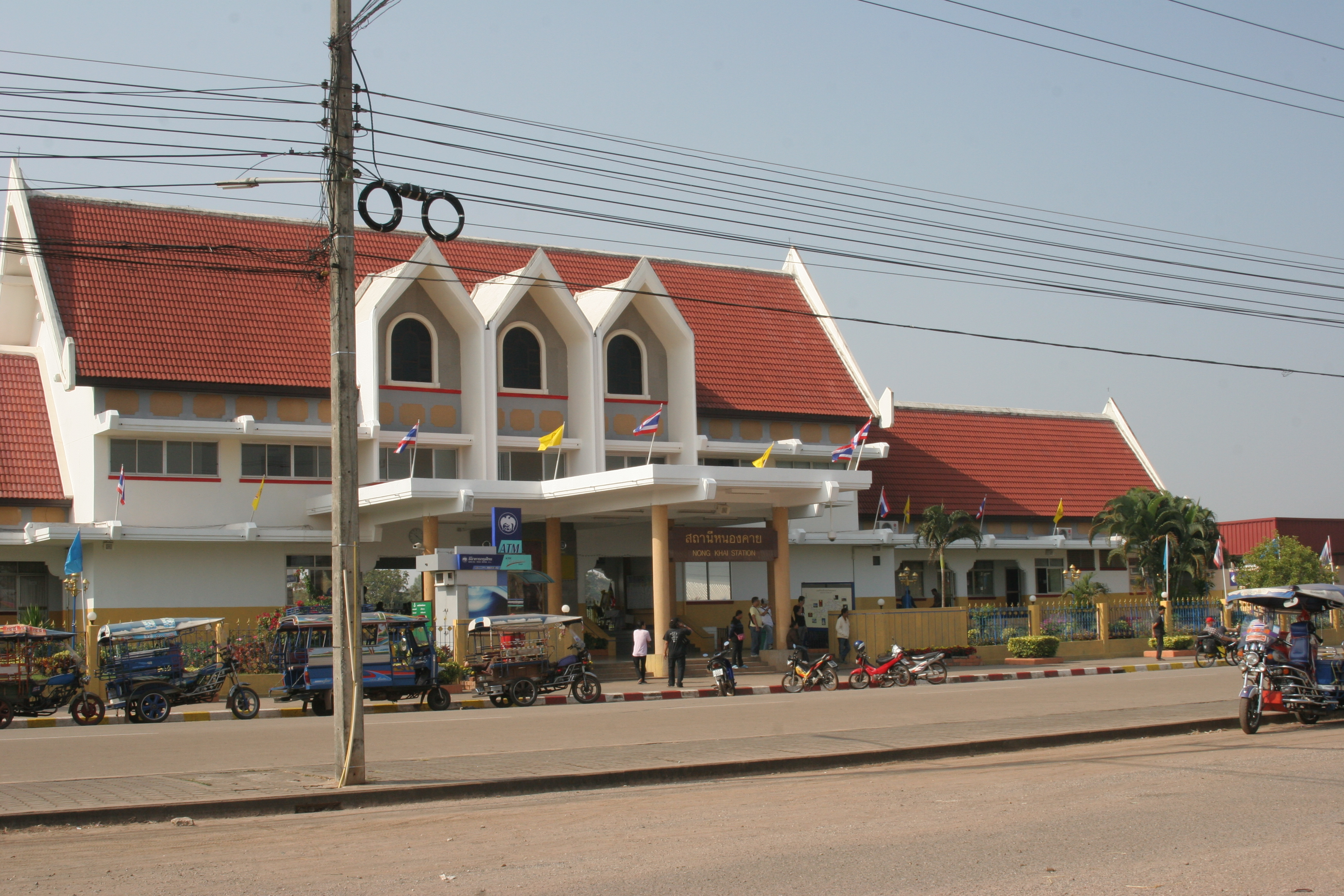
Nong Khai railway station

The main railway station in Nong Khai is Nong Khai railway station. This station can be considered the destination of the Upper Northeastern Railway Line (only in Thailand's area).

=== Road ===
The First Thai–Lao Friendship Bridge was largely funded by a gift to the Lao government from the Australian government. It is the road and railway gateway to Laos's capital, Vientiane (25 kilometers (16 mi) upriver), on the north bank opposite the Thai town of Si Chiang Mai District. Construction of a rail spur to Thanaleng outside of Vientiane was begun early-2007 and officially opened 5 March 2009.

Nong Khai is 626 km north of Bangkok and 60 km north of Udon Thani.

== Human achievement index 2022 ==
Health	Education	Employment	Income
22	33	48	40
Housing	Family	Transport	Participation
23	30	47	73
Province Nong Khai, with an HAI 2022 value of 0.6357 is "somewhat low", occupies place 46 in the ranking.

Since 2003, United Nations Development Programme (UNDP) in Thailand has tracked progress on human development at sub-national level using the Human achievement index (HAI), a composite index covering all the eight key areas of human development. National Economic and Social Development Board (NESDB) has taken over this task since 2017.

Rank	Classification
1 - 13	"high"
14 - 29	"somewhat high"
30 - 45	"average"
46 - 61	"somewhat low"
62 - 77	"low"

Map with provinces and HAI 2022 rankings
